= Infernal Affairs (film series) =

2002-2003 Hong Kong film series

Infernal Affairs film series
- Infernal Affairs trilogy Hong Kong Blu-ray box set

Chinese name
- Traditional Chinese: 無間道系列
- Simplified Chinese: 无间道系列
Transcriptions
Standard Mandarin
- Hanyu Pinyin: Wú Jiān Dào Xì Liè
Yue: Cantonese
- Jyutping: Mou4 Gaan3 Dou6 Hai6 Lit6
- Directed by: Andrew Lau; Alan Mak
- Written by: Felix Chong; Alan Mak
- Produced by: Andrew Lau
- Starring: Andy Lau (1,3); Tony Leung (1,3); Anthony Wong (1–3); Eric Tsang (1–3); Leon Lai (3); Francis Ng (2); Chen Daoming (3); Edison Chen (1–3); Shawn Yue (1–3); Chapman To (1–3); Kelly Chen (1,3); Sammi Cheng (1,3); Carina Lau (2–3); Hu Jun (1,3); Gordon Lam (1,3); Liu Kai-chi (2); Berg Ng (1,3); Wan Chi-keung (1–3)
- Cinematography: Andrew Lau; Lai Yiu-fai; Ng Man Ching
- Edited by: Danny Pang; Curran Pang
- Music by: Chan Kwong-wing
- Production companies: Media Asia Films; Basic Pictures
- Distributed by: Media Asia Distributions
- Running time: 338 minutes
- Country: Hong Kong
- Language: Cantonese
- Box office: 110,202,213 HKD

Infernal Affairs is a series of three crime drama films directed by Andrew Lau and Alan Mak, starring Andy Lau and Tony Leung. It tells the story of a police officer who infiltrates the triads, and a police officer secretly working for the same gang. The Chinese title means "the non-stop way", a reference to Avici, the lowest level of hell in Buddhism. The English title is a word play combining the law enforcement term "internal affairs" with the adjective "infernal". The Criterion Collection released the trilogy as a box set on November 15, 2022.

== Films ==
=== Infernal Affairs (2002) ===
Infernal Affairs focuses on a police officer named Chan Wing-yan (Tony Leung), who goes undercover into a triad, and a triad member Lau Kin-ming (Andy Lau), who infiltrates the Hong Kong Police Force. Each mole has been planted by the rival organisation to gain an advantage in intelligence over the other side. The more the moles become involved in their undercover lives, the more issues they have to cope with.

The prologue opens with the introduction of triad boss Hon Sam (Eric Tsang) ("Brother Sam"), who sends a number of young gangsters to the police academy as moles, among them a young Lau. Concurrently, a young Chan joins the police force but is seemingly expelled from the academy even though he manages to impress Superintendent Wong Chi-shing (Anthony Wong). In reality, Chan has become an undercover agent reporting only to Wong. Over the course of ten years, Chan experiences great stress from his undercover work while Lau quickly rises through the ranks in the police department. The film begins with a meeting between Chan and Lau in a hi-fi store without either of them knowing the other's identity.

Wong and his team interrupt a deal between Brother Sam and a Thai cocaine dealer after receiving a tip-off from Chan using Morse code. However, Lau alerts Brother Sam, giving him enough time to order his minions to dispose of the cocaine, eliminating solid evidence of the drug deal. After the incident, Wong and Sam are both aware that they each have a mole within their respective organisations, placing them in a race against time to root out the other mole. Later, Chan sees Sam conversing with Lau at a cinema but does not see Lau's face clearly; he ultimately fails to capture Lau. By this time, both Chan and Lau are struggling with their double identities – Chan starts losing faith in himself as a cop after being a gangster for ten years; Lau becomes more accustomed to the life of a police officer and he wants to erase his criminal background.

At their next meeting, Wong intends to pull Chan out of undercover work for fear of his safety. They are unaware that Lau has his subordinate, CIB Inspector "Big B", tracking him. Meanwhile, Brother Sam sends "Crazy" Keung and other henchmen to confront them after receiving intel from Lau. Inspector Big B informs Lau and sends an OCTB squad to save Wong. Chan flees from the building using a crane while Wong sacrifices himself to save him by distracting Sam's men. Wong is beaten and thrown off the roof by the gangsters. As the police close in, a shootout ensues in which several gangsters are killed. Keung drives Chan away from the scene, but later dies from a mortal gunshot wound. It is report on the news that Keung himself was an undercover cop; Sam assumes that he was the mole and that Chan killed him to protect the triad.

Lau retrieves Wong's cell phone and contacts Chan, with both of them agreeing to foil a drug deal by Sam. The plan succeeds and many of Sam's men are arrested, while Lau betrays Sam and kills him. Everything seems to have returned to normal – Chan can revert to his true identity as a cop, while Lau has erased his criminal connections by eliminating Sam's triad. However, back at police headquarters, Chan discovers that Lau was the mole and leaves immediately. Lau, realising what has happened, erases Chan's file from the police database and makes a copy on his personal computer, intending to use the proof of Chan's identity as leverage, so that Chan would not reveal his real identity. Chan spends an evening with his therapist, Dr. Lee Sum-yee, with whom he has fallen in love. He sends to Lau a compact disc with a recording that Sam kept between himself and Lau; the disc is inadvertently intercepted by Lau's girlfriend, Mary.

Chan and Lau meet on the same rooftop where Wong was killed earlier. Chan disarms Lau and holds his Glock 17 to Lau's head; Lau states calmly that he "wants to be a good person" now, but Chan rejects Lau's plea to help conceal his criminal past. Big B arrives on the scene shortly and orders Chan to release Lau. Chan holds Lau as a hostage at gunpoint and backs into an elevator, but upon moving his head from behind Lau he is suddenly shot in the head by Big B. Big B then calls Lau his "brother", revealing to him that he was also a mole planted by Sam. Big B assures Lau that he has destroyed the tape which contained evidence of Lau's criminal past. As they take the lift down to the lobby, Lau shoots Big B.

The original ending climaxes with Lau identifying himself to the police as one of them. Lee discovers records revealing Chan as the undercover officer; Big B is blamed of being the mole within the force and the case is closed. Lau salutes Chan at his funeral, with Cheung and Lee present as well. A flashback reaffirms the point that Lau wished he had taken a different route in life. In mainland China, an alternate ending for the film was screened, in which Lau exits the elevator and is informed by Cheung that the police have found evidence that he was a mole. Lau hands them his badge and is arrested without protest. The sequel, Infernal Affairs III, uses the original ending instead of the alternate one.

=== Infernal Affairs II (2003) ===
In 1991, Hong Kong police inspector Wong Chi-shing (Anthony Wong) meets with his informant, Hon Sam (Eric Tsang), while Lau Kin-ming, Hon's prospective mole within the Hong Kong Police Force, assassinates Hon's triad boss, Ngai Kwun. Lau is later greeted by Hon's wife, Mary, who casually ascertains whether he has any reservations about his mission for Hon. While giving him cash, Mary advises Lau to maintain a low profile. She also confesses that she was the person who ordered the hit on Ngai Kwun, admitting that Hon has no knowledge of this transgression and urges Lau to remain silent. Mary wants Hon to replace Ngai Kwun as the triad boss.

Meanwhile, instructors at the police academy discover that Chan Wing-yan, a promising but troubled cadet, is the half-brother to Ngai Kwun's heir, Ngai Wing-hau; he is subsequently discharged from the force. Chan is later approached by Wong, who asks him why he wants to be a cop; Chan replies, "I want to be a good guy." Wong subsequently makes Chan into an undercover agent for the police, sending him to prison to get close to one of Hon's henchmen, "Crazy" Keung. Meanwhile, Ngai Wing-hau takes his late father's place as triad boss; he is the only Ngai child directly involved in the family business. With Ngai dead, four other triad bosses, known as the "Big Four", dismiss Ngai and debate on whether to pay their tithe to his family. However, Ngai blackmails with his knowledge of their mutual betrayals. Hon acts as an agent provocateur for Ngai in this affair.

By 1995, Chan has become a small-time gangster while Lau rises as a rookie cop. Chan's continual association with Hon and Ngai causes his girlfriend to have an abortion because she does not want their child to follow in Chan's footsteps. Ngai wishes the troubled Chan to be integrated into the Ngai family and invites him to his daughter's birthday party, where he announces that he is retiring to Hawaii and dividing his former business amongst the Big Four, also giving Hon the Thai cocaine racket. Meanwhile, Hon leaks information on criminal dealings to Lau, who is able to apprehend many local gangsters and earn promotions in rank.

During Ngai's next drug deal, a Morse code message from Chan tips off the police about an abrupt change of plans for the meeting, allowing the kingpin to be arrested. However, a videotape found in Ngai's suitcase reveals that Wong conspired with Mary to have Ngai Kwun killed, giving the triad leverage over the police. As he is being taken in for questioning, Ngai initiates his plan for vengeance against his father's murderers: the Big Four are killed by Ngai's men; an ambush awaits Hon in Thailand; and an assassin edges towards Mary. Mary manages to escape danger with help from Lau and Keung, but is betrayed by Lau when she rejects his romantic feelings toward her. She is run over by Ngai's henchmen at Kai Tak Airport.

In 1997, Lau is picked as one of the officers to preside over the ceremony signifying Britain's handover of Hong Kong to China. Ngai attempts to enter politics, but his support disintegrates after Hon betrays him to the police. Wong brings Hon back to Hong Kong under witness protection, but Ngai manages to kidnap his family in retribution. However, during the confrontation between Ngai and Hon, it is revealed that Hon's Thai associates are also holding Ngai's family hostage in Hawaii and that the woman being held hostage is a decoy. Wong arrives with a task force and guns down Ngai, who dies in Chan's arms. Moments before succumbing to his wound, Ngai discovers the wire in Chan's jacket and realizes that his half-brother is an undercover cop.

Hon's tactics against Ngai leads to a falling out between him and Wong; shortly after their final meeting, Ngai's entire family is murdered. The pieces are set in place for the first film: Hon goes down the dark path of replacing Ngai as the main triad boss, becoming Wong's new foe; Lau is a police inspector and Hon's mole; Chan is forced to remain undercover, returning to join Hon's triad. As the handover ceremony takes place, Hon sheds tears over the loss of Mary before hosting a party. Back at police headquarters, Lau handles a case involving a young woman, coincidentally also called Mary, who becomes his wife in Infernal Affairs.

=== Infernal Affairs III (2003) ===
Infernal Affairs III uses parallel storytelling, flashing between the past and the present.

==== Six months before Chan's death ====
Undercover cop Chan Wing-yan seeks to uncover the link between Hong Kong triad boss Hon Sam and the mysterious Chinese gang leader Shen Cheng. Since Hon's ascension to the seat of triad boss was due to the death of his predecessor, Ngai Wing-hau, Hon is suspicious of all his men for fear they might usurp his position. He tests Chan's loyalty by ordering him to smash an ashtray on Shen's brother during a negotiation, resulting in Chan's arrest by Inspector Yeung Kam-wing. Yeung tells Chan that though Chan does not recognise him, he recognises Chan and he warns the latter to "be careful". Chan is released after both Hon and Shen fetch him at police headquarters.

Concurrently, Chan is prosecuted for violent behaviour. His superior, Superintendent Wong Chi-shing, persuades the court to allow Chan to seek therapy, leading him to meet Dr. Lee Sum-yee. Hon asks Chan to deliver arms to Shen, but he and other triad members do not show up. When Chan delivers the cargo, Shen's men discover that the boxes are empty and open fire on Chan; Shen and Chan shoot each other in the limbs during the crossfire. Shen finds out that Chan is an undercover cop when Yeung unexpectedly arrives on the scene. Yeung tells Chan that Shen is also an undercover cop, working for Chinese authorities. Yeung also tells Chan that he gained top honours when he was in the police academy due to Chan's "expulsion". The three shake hands and wait for the chaos to subside before leaving.

==== Ten months after Chan's death ====
Lau Kin-ming, Hon's former mole in the Hong Kong Police Force, has been demoted to administrative duty pending an investigation into the deaths of Chan and Inspector B. He falsely claims that B shot Chan in the head while holding him hostage, and that he killed B in retaliation. After months of investigation, Lau is transferred back to Internal Affairs, where he struggles to whitewash his past and cover his true identity. Lau later learns that Hon had previously planted five other moles in the police force, one of whom might be a fellow Security Division Inspector, Yeung. A battle of wits develops between Lau and Yeung, as each of them tries to discover the other's secret.

Meanwhile, Lau suffers from an identity collapse as he loses track of reality, wrestling with guilt over Chan's death and grappling with his impending divorce from his wife, Mary. His psychological trauma deteriorates to the point where he begins to see himself as Chan. As "Chan", Lau makes it a personal mission to apprehend Yeung, whom he sees as his former self. After witnessing an incident where Lau suffers a hallucination, Dr. Lee conducts a hypnosis on him and finds out that he was Hon's mole. Lau realises his folly and knocks Lee unconscious before escaping.

Lau steals tapes from Yeung's office safe, using spy cameras to determine the code. He thinks he hears recordings of Yeung relating information to Hon, and leads his team to the Security Division to arrest Yeung just as Shen arrives. Lau plays a tape recording, which is actually the conversation between him and Hon. When Lau's second-in-command tries to arrest him instead, Lau panics and draws his gun, killing Yeung. He is immediately shot by Shen and attempts suicide by shooting himself in the neck. During a search of Lau's office, a tape is found in his safe and played. It is a recording of the song sung by Tsai Chin, given to him by Hon's wife.

==== Eleven months after Chan's death ====
A series of flashbacks play: immediately after Chan's death, Shen and Yeung meet. Shen suspects Lau. Yeung breaks into Lau's office to find tape recordings of his conversations with Hon, proving that Shen is right.

Yeung is buried next to Chan in the police cemetery. Shen and Lee visit the graves and Shen says to Lee: "Events change men, but men do not change events. But these two men are extraordinary because they changed events."

Lau ends up crippled and catatonic, lost inside his own mind, haunted by the spirit of Mary (Hon Sam's wife, whom he had a crush on in Infernal Affairs II) and locked in his own "continuous hell". His divorced wife Mary visits and tells him, "Our baby can say "papa" now." Before the picture fades into the next scene, the camera pans down onto Lau's fingers tapping out in Morse code, "H-E-L..." (and then the start of another "L" as the picture dims).

Before the film ends, there is one final flashback to the hi-fi shop scene in Infernal Affairs, where Lau is buying an audio system from Chan.

== Cast and characters ==
Character	Film		
Character	I	II	III
Senior Inspector Lau Kin Ming	Andy Lau		Andy Lau
Young Lau Kin Ming	Edison Chen	Edison Chen	Edison Chen
Chan Wing Yan	Tony Leung Chiu-Wai		Tony Leung Chiu-Wai
Young Chan Wing Yan	Shawn Yue	Shawn Yue	Shawn Yue
Superintendent Wong Chi Sing	Anthony Wong	Anthony Wong	Anthony Wong
Sam Hon	Eric Tsang	Eric Tsang	Eric Tsang
Tsui Wai Keung	Chapman To	Chapman To	Chapman To
Mary	Sammi Cheng	Chiu Chung Yu	Sammi Cheng
Lee Sum Yee	Kelly Chen		Kelly Chen
Inspector Lam Kwok Ping	Gordon Lam	Cheung Wing Hong	Gordon Lam
Ngai Wing Hau		Francis Ng	
Superintendent Yeung Kam Wing			Leon Lai
Young Yeung Kam Wing			Eddie Li
Shen Ching			Chen Daoming
Mary Hon		Carina Lau	Carina Lau
Superintendent Luk Kai Cheung		Hu Jun	
Senior Inspector Cheung	Berg Ng		Berg Ng
Chief Superintendent Leung	Wan Chi-keung	Wan Chi-keung	Wan Chi-keung
Del Pierro	Dion Lam		
Officer Yip Kam Fung	Hui Kam Fung	Hui Kam Fung	
Thai Drug Dealer	Chaucharew Wichai	Chaucharew Wichai	
May	Elva Hsiao	Kelly Fu	
Law Kai Yin		Roy Cheung	
Uncle Three		Liu Kai-chi	
Elder sister		Kara Hui	
Shen Liang			Huang Zhizhong

== Music ==
=== Infernal Affairs ===
The original film score for Infernal Affairs was written and performed by Chan Kwong-wing.

Track listing
No.	Title	Artist(s)	Length
1.	"Entering The Inferno"	Chan Kwong-wing	2:06
2.	"If I Were Him"	Chan Kwong-wing	1:36
3.	"Goodbye Master"	Chan Kwong-wing	2:18
4.	"Who Are You?"	Chan Kwong-wing	2:44
5.	"Let Me Quit"	Chan Kwong-wing	1:32
6.	"I Dreamt About You"	Chan Kwong-wing	1:23
7.	"Salute"	Chan Kwong-wing	1:56
8.	"Mission Abort"	Chan Kwong-wing	4:31
9.	"I Am A Cop!"	Chan Kwong-wing	3:26
10.	"You Are The Only One"	Chan Kwong-wing	1:06
11.	"I Want To Be A Good Guy"	Chan Kwong-wing	3:30
12.	"Goodbye Master, Goodbye"	Chan Kwong-wing	1:56
13.	"The Inferno"	Chan Kwong-wing	1:51

The theme song, Infernal Affairs (無間道), was composed by Ronald Ng, lyrics provided by Albert Leung, and performed in Cantonese and Mandarin by Andy Lau and Tony Leung.

=== Infernal Affairs II ===
The film's score was composed by Chan Kwong-wing. The theme song, Eternal Realm (長空; Changkong), was composed by Wong Ka-keung, lyrics provided by Wong and Yip Sai-wing, and performed by the band Beyond.

=== Infernal Affairs III ===
The film's score was composed by Chan Kwong-wing. The theme song, Road to Inferno (自作自受; Zi Zuo Zi Shou), was composed by Andy Lau, Chan Tak-kin and Wan Ho-kit, lyrics provided by Andy Lau, and performed by Hacken Lee. Andy Lau also sang an alternate version of the song.

== Reception ==
=== Infernal Affairs ===
Infernal Affairs was released on 12 December 2002 to Hong Kong Theaters to universal critical acclaim. Review tallying website Rotten Tomatoes reported that 57 of the tallied 60 reviews were positive, for a score of 95% and a certification of "fresh". Infernal Affairs won seven out of the sixteen awards it was nominated for at the 22nd Hong Kong Film Awards, beating Zhang Yimou's Hero for the Best Film award. It also won Best Picture awards in the Golden Horse Awards and the Golden Bauhinia Awards among other awards too. It was ranked No. 30 in Empire magazine's "The 100 Best Films of World Cinema" in 2010. It is the highest ranked Hong Kong film on Internet Movie Database's Top 250 movies list.

Infernal Affairs has grossed HK$55,057,176 in Hong Kong and USD$169,659 in North America.

=== Infernal Affairs II ===
The film was highly anticipated prior to its release due to the success achieved by Infernal Affairs. However, the general response to the film was mixed.

The film grossed HK$24,919,376, which was high by 2003 Hong Kong standards, but only about half of the original's earnings.

=== Infernal Affairs III ===
Despite grossing higher than the second film at the box office with HKD 30,225,661 (over HKD 5 million more than Infernal Affairs II), Infernal Affairs III was not as critically successful as the previous film. It garnered mixed to positive reviews.

== Awards and nominations ==
=== Infernal Affairs ===
List of Accolades
Award / Film Festival	Category	Recipient(s)	Result
Udine Far East Film Festival	Audience Award	Andrew Lau; Alan Mak	Won
76th Academy Awards	Best Foreign Language Film	Andrew Lau (Hong Kong entry)	Not Nominated
Asia Pacific Film Festival	Best Sound	Kinson Tsang	Won
46th Blue Ribbon Awards	Best Foreign Language Film	Andrew Lau; Alan Mak	Won
Belgian Syndicate of Cinema Critics	Grand Prix		Nominated
40th Golden Horse Awards	Best Picture		Won
40th Golden Horse Awards	Best Director	Andrew Lau; Alan Mak	Won
40th Golden Horse Awards	Best Actor	Tony Leung	Won
40th Golden Horse Awards	Best Supporting Actor	Anthony Wong	Won
40th Golden Horse Awards	Best Sound Effects	Kinson Tsang King-Cheung	Won
40th Golden Horse Awards	Viewer's Choice Award		Won
40th Golden Horse Awards	Best Actor	Andy Lau	Nominated
40th Golden Horse Awards	Best Original Screenplay	Alan Mak; Felix Chong	Nominated
40th Golden Horse Awards	Best Film Editing	Danny Pang; Pang Ching-Hei	Nominated
40th Golden Horse Awards	Best Cinematography	Andrew Lau; Lai Yiu-Fai	Nominated
40th Golden Horse Awards	Best Art Direction	Choo Sung Pong; Wong Ching-Ching	Nominated
40th Golden Horse Awards	Best Action Choreography	Dion Lam Dik-On	Nominated
40th Golden Horse Awards	Best Visual Effects	Christopher Doyle	Nominated
8th Golden Bauhinia Awards	Best Picture		Won
8th Golden Bauhinia Awards	Best Director	Andrew Lau; Alan Mak	Won
8th Golden Bauhinia Awards	Best Actor	Tony Leung	Won
8th Golden Bauhinia Awards	Best Actor	Andy Lau	Nominated
8th Golden Bauhinia Awards	Best Supporting Actor	Anthony Wong	Won
8th Golden Bauhinia Awards	Best Original Screenplay	Alan Mak; Felix Chong	Won
9th Hong Kong Film Critics Society Awards	Film of Merit		Won
9th Hong Kong Film Critics Society Awards	Best Actor	Anthony Wong	Won
22nd Hong Kong Film Awards	Best Film		Won
22nd Hong Kong Film Awards	Best Director	Andrew Lau; Alan Mak	Won
22nd Hong Kong Film Awards	Best Screenplay	Alan Mak; Felix Chong	Won
22nd Hong Kong Film Awards	Best Actor	Tony Leung	Won
22nd Hong Kong Film Awards	Best Actor	Andy Lau	Nominated
22nd Hong Kong Film Awards	Best Supporting Actor	Anthony Wong	Won
22nd Hong Kong Film Awards	Best Supporting Actor	Eric Tsang	Nominated
22nd Hong Kong Film Awards	Best Supporting Actor	Chapman To	Nominated
22nd Hong Kong Film Awards	Best Cinematography	Andrew Lau; Lai Yiu-Fai	Nominated
22nd Hong Kong Film Awards	Best Film Editing	Danny Pang; Pang Ching Hei	Won
22nd Hong Kong Film Awards	Best Costume Design	Lee Pik-Kwan	Nominated
22nd Hong Kong Film Awards	Best Action Choreography	Dion Lam	Nominated
22nd Hong Kong Film Awards	Best Original Film Score	Chan Kwong Wing	Nominated
22nd Hong Kong Film Awards	Best Original Film Song	Song: "Infernal Affairs" Composer: Ronald Ng; Lyrics: Albert Leung; Sung by: Tony Leung, Andy Lau	Won
22nd Hong Kong Film Awards	Best Sound Design	Kinson Tsang King-Cheung	Nominated
22nd Hong Kong Film Awards	Best Visual Effects	Christopher Doyle	Nominated

=== Infernal Affairs II ===
Although Infernal Affairs II earned twelve nominations for the 2003 Hong Kong Film Awards, it could not match its predecessor's success. The film won only one award, Best Original Film Song, for the song "長空" (performed by Cantopop band Beyond). The film won the Best Film award at the Hong Kong Film Critics Society Awards.

23rd Hong Kong Film Awards

- Won: Best Original Film Song (Wong Ka Keung, Yip Sai Wing, Beyond)
- Nominated: Best Film (Andrew Lau)
- Nominated: Best Director (Andrew Lau, Mak Siu-fai)
- Nominated: Best Screenplay (Mak Siu-fai, Chong Man-keung)
- Nominated: Best Actor (Francis Ng)
- Nominated: Best Actress (Carina Lau)
- Nominated: Best Supporting Actor (Chapman To)
- Nominated: Best Supporting Actor (Liu Kai-chi)
- Nominated: Best Cinematography (Andrew Lau, Ng Man-ching)
- Nominated: Best Editing (Curran Pang, Danny Pang)
- Nominated: Best Original Film Score (Chan Kwong-wing)
- Nominated: Best Sound Effects (Kinson Tsang)

10th Hong Kong Film Critics Society Awards

- Won: Best Film

=== Infernal Affairs III ===
23rd Hong Kong Film Awards

- Nominated: Best Picture
- Nominated: Best Screenplay
- Nominated: Best Cinematography
- Nominated: Best Film Editing
- Nominated: Best Original Film Score
- Nominated: Best Sound Effects
- Nominated: Best Visual Effects

41st Golden Horse Awards

- Won: Best Actor (Andy Lau)

9th Golden Bauhinia Awards

- Nominated: Best Actor (Andy Lau)

== Remakes ==
- The Departed (2006)
- City of Damnation (2009)
