= Overheard (film) =

2009 Hong Kong film by Alan Mak and Felix Chong

- Theatrical poster
- Directed by: Alan Mak; Felix Chong
- Written by: Alan Mak; Felix Chong
- Produced by: Henry Fong; Derek Yee
- Starring: Lau Ching-wan; Louis Koo; Daniel Wu
- Cinematography: Anthony Pun
- Edited by: Kwong Chi-leung; Chan Chi-wai
- Music by: Chan Kwong-wing
- Production companies: Sil-Metropole Organisation; Pop Movies; Bona International Film Group
- Distributed by: Distribution Workshop
- Release date: 30 July 2009
- Running time: 99 minutes
- Country: Hong Kong
- Languages: Cantonese; English
- Budget: US$5–10 million

Overheard (traditional Chinese: 竊聽風雲; simplified Chinese: 窃听风云; pinyin: Qie Ting Feng Yun; Cantonese Yale: Sit Teng Fung Wan) is a 2009 Hong Kong crime thriller film written and directed by Alan Mak and Felix Chong, and produced by Henry Fong and Derek Yee. The film stars Lau Ching-wan, Louis Koo and Daniel Wu as a trio of police officers conducting surveillance on a public company. The film was released theatrically in Hong Kong on 30 July 2009. The sequel, Overheard 2, was released in 2011.

== Plot ==
A major stock exchange in the world, Hong Kong attracts not only money but any who try to manipulate the market. At the Hong Kong Police Force Commercial Crime Bureau, an operation is underway to infiltrate a trading company, Feng Hua International where a man, nicknamed "Boss" is the chief suspect. The team of Criminal Intelligence Bureau (CIB) officers, led by Inspector Leung (Lau Ching-wan) together with Yeung (Louis Koo) and Lam (Daniel Wu), installs interception devices to monitor the company's communications. Yeung is a family man, has a wife, a daughter, and a son who is suffering from a serious illness and needs constant attention, while Lam, a young newcomer to the team, is to be married to the daughter of a wealthy man. Leung is a calm experienced officer who is having an affair with Mandy (Zhang Jingchu) who happens to be the wife of his friend Lee (Alex Fong).

One night, while monitoring a conversation between the company's manager and his secretary, Yeung and Lam overhear that the stock price will surge on market opening the next day. Seeing an opportunity, Yeung asks Lam to delete the portion of the recording so he can take advantage of it. The next day, Lam opens an account at a stock brokerage house but is discovered by Leung. However, Lam has already invested in the stock on a deep loan. The stock rises quickly, but before the trio manages to sell it, trading is suspended due to unusual trading activity.

Back in the operation center, the three of them overhear a plot to murder the manager over a listening device planted unofficially. To report the intelligence would lead them to suspicion and ruin their future, and Lam begs Leung not to report it. Having thought about it, Leung decides instead to stop the murder themselves. They ambush the murderer as he force-feeds the unconscious manager with pills to fake a death scene. Leung's face, however, is briefly seen by the manager's girlfriend. Seeing him again along with Yeung and Lam at the station after selling their shares worth $15 million, she calls the Boss's men, allowing him to track them down, seek retribution, and organise the deaths of Leung, Lam, Yeung, and their families. Because of Leung's compassion for his subordinates' mistakes and unwillingness to turn them in and seek help from the rest of the police force, he is unable to stop their unnecessary deaths. Faced with guilt, Leung turns himself in to the "Boss's" henchmen, and the Boss's subordinate, Wah, seemingly executes Leung in an unmarked grave, watched by the "Boss".

A year later the "Boss" gives a speech at a charity function. But during the recital, a video plays on screen showing the whole room the Boss's shadowy dealings the morning before. Surrounded by the police and ICAC officials, the Boss attempts to cut off the videofeed but is stopped and detained by a very much alive Inspector Leung. It is revealed that Leung had bought off Wah, promising the entire $15 million to him in exchange for not killing him prior to Leung's "execution". Wah would then act as Leung's agent in bringing down the Boss. While under police escort, the van carrying the Boss drives off course, and the driver is revealed to be Yeung, who was the sole survivor of the attempted murder of him and his family. Yeung drives himself and the Boss off the unfinished bridge into the harbour as part of a murder-suicide, while Leung sadly looks on and remembers the happy times with his two subordinates.

== Cast ==
- Lau Ching-wan as Johnny Leung
- Louis Koo as Gene Yeung
- Daniel Wu as Max Lam
- Zhang Jingchu as Mandy Yam
- Alex Fong Chun-sun as Kelvin Lee
- Lam Ka-wah as Frankie Wong
- Waise Lee as Ringo Low
- Michael Wong as Willie Ma
- William Chan

== Production ==
Overheard was written and directed by Alan Mak and Felix Chong, the writers behind the Infernal Affairs trilogy. The film was produced by Sil-Metropole Organisation and Pop Movies, the production company behind Chong and Mak's previous film Lady Cop & Papa Crook. The film was produced by Derek Yee, who previously worked with the film's lead actors Lau Ching-Wan, Louis Koo and Daniel Wu. Yee has described the film as an "ensemble film", since it was hard to get all three actors to work together on one film. Before filming began, Daniel Wu held a party at his home with the rest of the lead actors, so they could establish their on-screen chemistry beforehand.

The film also marks the ninth collaboration between actors Lau Ching-Wan and Louis Koo. When the directors first approached him with the screenplay, Koo thought that they were playing a trick on him, since his character was much older than Lau's character. To prepare for the role, he had to apply makeup, gain 30 pounds and get a new hairstyle.

An integral part of the movie is the use of headphones, amongst other listening equipment: 2 seen are the Audio-Technica ATH-PRO700, the TDK ST-PR300 and the Creative Technology HQ 1400.

== Marketing ==
The film's teaser poster shows a severed ear on a mouse trap. According to directors Alan Mak and Felix Chong, the imagery of the poster was to convey the darkness that the human soul is capable of.

== Awards and nominations ==
16th Hong Kong Film Critics Society Award

- Won: Best Director (Alan Mak and Felix Chong)
- Film of Merit

29th Hong Kong Film Awards

- Nominated: Best Film
- Nominated: Best Director (Alan Mak and Felix Chong)
- Nominated: Best Screenplay (Alan Mak and Felix Chong)
- Nominated: Best Actor (Lau Ching-Wan)
- Nominated: Best Supporting Actor (Alex Fong)
- Won: Best Film Editing (Kong Chi Leung and Chan Chi Wai)

== Sequels ==
Due to the film's great success, the sequel Overheard 2 began production and was released on 18 August 2011. Overheard 3 was released on 30 May 2014.

== Remakes ==
In November 2014, Studio 8 and Bona Film Group were reportedly producing an English-language remake.

In 2017, director Choi Dong-hoon began production on a South Korean remake titled Wiretap. However, production was halted so its actor Kim Woo-bin could undergo treatment for cancer, and Choi began work on another project.

== See also ==
- List of films featuring surveillance
