= 23rd Hong Kong Film Awards =

2004 Hong Kong Film Awards

- Date: 4 April 2004
- Site: Hong Kong Cultural Centre
- Hosted by: Dayo Wong; Bowie Tsang; Athena Chu; Candice Yu; Cherrie Ying; Terri Kwan; Ada Choi; Josie Ho; Kristy Yang; Jo Koo

The 23rd Hong Kong Film Awards ceremony was held on 4 April 2004 in the Hong Kong Cultural Centre. Hosts for the ceremony consisted of Dayo Wong and a line-up of nine female celebrities, namely Bowie Tsang, Athena Chu, Candice Yu, Cherrie Ying, Terri Kwan, Ada Choi, Josie Ho, Kristy Yang and Jo Koo. Twenty-three winners in nineteen categories were unveiled. Running on Karma clinched the award for Best Film, while its leading man Andy Lau received his second Best Actor title in the Hong Kong Film Awards.

== Awards ==
Winners are listed first, highlighted in boldface, and indicated with a double dagger (‡).

**Best Film**: **Running On Karma**‡; PTU; Infernal Affairs II; Infernal Affairs III; Lost In Time	**Best Director**: **Johnnie To – PTU**‡; Benny Chan – Heroic Duo; Derek Yee – Lost In Time; Johnnie To and Wai Ka-Fai – Running On Karma; Andrew Lau and Alan Mak – Infernal Affairs II
**Best Screenplay**: **Wai Ka-Fai, Yau Nai-hoi, Au Kin-Yee** **and Yip Tin-Shing – Running On Karma**‡; Alan Mak and Felix Chong – Infernal Affairs II; Yau Nai-hoi and Au Kin-Yee – PTU; Alan Mak and Felix Chong – Infernal Affairs III; James Yuen and Jessica Fong – Lost In Time	**Best Actor**: **Andy Lau – Running On Karma**‡; Sean Lau – Lost In Time; Jacky Cheung – Golden Chicken 2; Francis Ng – Infernal Affairs II; Simon Yam – PTU
**Best Actress**: **Cecilia Cheung – Lost In Time**‡; Karena Lam – The Floating Landscape; Carina Lau – Infernal Affairs II; Sandra Ng – Golden Chicken 2; Cecilia Cheung – Running On Karma	**Best Supporting Actor**: **Tony Leung Ka-Fai – Men Suddenly In Black**‡; Chapman To – Infernal Affairs II; Liu Kai-chi – Infernal Affairs II; Cheung Siu-Fai – Running On Karma; Ronald Cheng – My Lucky Star
**Best Supporting Actress**: **Josie Ho – Naked Ambition**‡; Candy Lo – Truth or Dare: 6th Floor Rear Flat; Paw Hee-ching – Lost In Time; Josie Ho – The Twins Effect; Maggie Siu – PTU	**Best New Performer**: **Andy On – Star Runner**‡; Vanness Wu – Star Runner; Po Po – Hidden Track; Edwin Siu – Truth or Dare: 6th Floor Rear Flat; Kenneth Cheung – PTU
**Best Cinematography**: **Arthur Wong – The Floating Landscape**‡; Cheng Siu-Keung – PTU; Anthony Pun – Heroic Duo; Andrew Lau and Ng Man-Ching – Infernal Affairs II; Andrew Lau and Ng Man-Ching – Infernal Affairs III	**Best Film Editing**: **Chan Ki-Hop – The Twins Effect**‡; Danny Pang and Pang Ching-Hei – Infernal Affairs II; Danny Pang and Pang Ching-Hei – Infernal Affairs III; Law Wing-Cheong – Running On Karma; Law Wing-Cheong – PTU
**Best Art Direction**: **Bill Lui – The Twins Effect**‡; Kenneth Yee and Ken Mak – Golden Chicken 2; Bruce Yu – Turn Left Turn Right; Bruce Yu – Running On Karma; Ben Luk – The Floating Landscape	**Best Costume Make Up Design**: **Kenneth Yee – The Twins Effect**‡; Bruce Yu and Stephanie Wong – Running on Karma; Bruce Yu and Stephanie Wong – Turn Left, Turn Right; William Chang – The Floating Landscape; Kenneth Yee and Stanley Cheung – Golden Chicken 2
**Best Action Choreography**: **Donnie Yen – The Twins Effect**‡; Sammo Hung – The Medallion; Stephen Tung – Heroic Duo; Chin Kar-lok – Star Runner; Yuen Bun – Running On Karma	**Best Original Film Score**: **Peter Kam – Lost In Time**‡; Chung Chi-Wing, Ben Cheung – Turn Left, Turn Right; Comfort Chan – Infernal Affairs III; Chung Chi-Wing – PTU; Comfort Chan – Infernal Affairs II
**Best Original Film Song**: **長空 – Infernal Affairs II**‡; Composer: Wong Ka Keung; Lyricist: Wong Ka Keung and Yip Sai Wing; Singer: Beyond; 身外情 – Running on Karma; Composer: Gaybird; Lyricist: Albert Leung; Singer: Anthony Wong; 兩個人的幸運 – Turn Left, Turn Right; Composer: Peter Kam; Lyricist: Albert Leung; Singer: Gigi Leung; 下一站天后 – Diva: Ah Hey; Composer: Ronald Ng; Lyricist: Wyman Wong; Singer: Charlene Choi; Forget the Unforgettable – Lost In Time; Composer: Peter Kam; Lyricist: Chan Fai Young; Singer: Cecilia Cheung	**Best Sound Design**: **Steven Ticknor and Kinson Tsang – The Twins Effect**‡; Kinson Tsang – Infernal Affairs II; Kinson Tsang – Infernal Affairs III; Martin Chappell – PTU; Martin Chappell, May Mok and Charlie Lo – Running on Karma
**Best Visual Effects**: **Eddy Wong and Yee Kwok-Leung – The Twins Effect**‡; Stephen Ma – PTU; Eddy Wong, Victor Wong – Infernal Affairs III; Paddy Eason, Merrin Jensen, Lars Johansson and Matthew Gidney – The Medallion; Stephen Ma – Running on Karma	**Best Asian Film**: **The Twilight Samurai (Japan)**‡; Balzac and the Little Chinese Seamstress (China); Blue Gate Crossing (Taiwan); Together (China); The Classic (South Korea)
**Best New Director**: **Pang Ho-Cheung – Men Suddenly In Black**‡; Barbara Wong – Truth or Dare: 6th Floor Rear Flat; Carol Lai – The Floating Landscape	**Timeless Artistic Achievement Award**: **Anita Mui**‡; **Leslie Cheung**‡
**Professional Achievement Award**: **Richard Lam**‡; **Blacky Ko**‡

The Timeless Artistic Achievement Award was a special award presented to Anita Mui and Leslie Cheung in recognition of their contributions to Hong Kong cinema.

Timeless Artistic Achievement Award
- Country: Hong Kong
- Presented by: Hong Kong Film Awards
- First award: 2004
