= Lady Cop & Papa Crook =

2008 Hong Kong film by Alan Mak and Felix Chong

- Promotional poster
- Directed by: Alan Mak; Felix Chong
- Written by: Alan Mak; Felix Chong
- Produced by: John Chong
- Starring: Sammi Cheng; Eason Chan
- Cinematography: Edmond Fung
- Edited by: Kong Chi-Leung
- Music by: Chan Kwong-Wing
- Production companies: Media Asia Films; China Film Media Asia; Beijing Silver Moon; Pop Movies
- Distributed by: Hong Kong: Media Asia Distribution; China: Enlight Pictures; Singapore; Shaw Organisation
- Release dates: 24 December 2008 (China); 1 January 2009 (Hong Kong)
- Running time: 92 minutes
- Country: Hong Kong
- Languages: Cantonese; Mandarin
- Budget: HK$30 million
- Box office: HK$3,877,879

Lady Cop & Papa Crook (Chinese: 大搜查之女; pinyin: Da sou zha zhi nu; Cantonese Yale: Daai sau cha ji neui) is a 2008 Hong Kong crime film written and directed by Alan Mak and Felix Chong, and starring Sammi Cheng and Eason Chan. Chan plays the kingpin of a red diesel crime ring who is forced to team up and co-operate with a hot-tempered police officer (Cheng) when his son is kidnapped, thus beginning an unlikely alliance between fellow police officers and criminals.

The film marks Cheng's first feature-film role after a three-year absence from the Hong Kong cinema scene, her last film being the 2005 film Everlasting Regret. After filming, Lady Cop & Papa Crook's theatrical release date was delayed several times, due to the film not meeting Chinese censorship standards, which resulted in several scenes being reshot. The film later received a confirmed Hong Kong release date of 1 January 2009 in Hong Kong and Singapore.

== Plot ==
John Fok (Eason Chan) is the kingpin of illegal red diesel in Greater China. When an oil tanker explodes accidentally, he becomes the focus of investigation by Hong Kong and Mainland Chinese police and is forced to halt his business to wait things out. While his business rivals start closing in, a member of his household is planning to betray him. On the surface, John seems totally helpless, but in reality, he has been staging a major comeback for months. Just as he is finally ready to turn his fortune around, however, his only son is kidnapped.

Senior Inspector Maureen Szeto (Sammi Cheng) is the rising star in the police force, who is well praised for busting crime with her characteristic sangfroid and precision. However, in matters of love, she is totally at wit's end. After dating the same man for more than ten years with no likely prospect of an imminent wedding, she determines to cut the knot once and for all, before she becomes too old for childbirth. Poised at the crossroad of her life, she is thrilled to be assigned to investigate the kidnapping of John's son.

John dispatches his whole gang to ferret out his son's whereabouts, only to find out that his rivals are redeploying people in China to assail him. Just when he is about to order an all-out fightback, Maureen suddenly arrives with her team to garrison at his house. Spurning her at first, he soon finds her critical analysis of the situation at hand both apt and useful. An unlikely co-operation between cops and crooks thus ensues, leading to conflicts and clashes galore at every step till the very end.

== Cast ==
- Sammi Cheng as Senior Inspector Maureen Szeto Mo-Lin
- Eason Chan as John Fok
- Richie Ren as Gogo
- Michelle Ye as Yammy
- Chapman To as Vincent Lee
- Kate Tsui as Fiona Chan
- Zhang Guoli as Xu Ban Shan
- Felix Lok as Uncle Shing
- Wilfred Lau as Ron Fok
- Liu Kai-Chi as Bowie Cheung
- Vincent Kok as Momo
- Jo Kuk as Joey
- Stephanie Che as Vivian
- Michelle Loo as Jenny
- Kenny Wong Tak-Bun as Darren
- Dong Yong as Zhao Tianhe
- Conroy Chan as Michael
- Emotion Cheung
- Tin Kai-Man as Toto
- Joe Cheung as Uncle Wing

== Production ==
Lady Cop & Papa Crook marks the second co-directorial partnership between Alan Mak and Felix Chong, the writers behind the Infernal Affairs trilogy. The two reunite with Sammi Cheng who appeared in Infernal Affairs, and its third instalment. The film was shot under a budget of HK$30 million.

=== Development ===
The original storyline for Lady Cop & Papa Crook centred on two strong male characters. The idea took shape while Alan Mak was talking to police officer-friends and randomly asked whether or not they would be prepared to investigate a kidnapping of a gangster's son. Mak was told of a proper procedure: “If [one of your family members] is kidnapped, the first thing the police do is to blockade your home. The immediate image I had was a group of gangsters and police officers being trapped in the same place. A lot of interesting things could happen."

The idea led to a script, but when the script was finally completed, Mak felt uncomfortable with the concept of another male buddy film. Chong and Mak decided that the film would center on a female police officer, and immediately thought of Sammi Cheng being cast in the lead role. The directors both felt that Cheng was a role model among women. Chong had thought about casting Eason Chan, while attending one of his concerts in 2006. During filming, the two directors taught Chan to use a method of acting similar to that of Tony Leung Chiu-Wai. Chong and Mak also revealed that the suit Cheng wears in the film was custom-made and modelled after the suit Andy Lau wears in Infernal Affairs.

=== Censorship ===
Lady Cop & Papa Crook was scheduled for released in September 2008, but was postponed when the film failed to meet Chinese government censorship standards. Lady Cop & Papa Crook was submitted to the Hong Kong government's Television and Entertainment Licensing Authority on 7 August 2008, with a version running at 97 minutes. The film was given a Category IIB certificate, but problems with Mainland Chinese censors resulted in several scenes being reshot, and the film was resubmitted to the TELA. On 11 December, a cut version of the film, now running at 91 minutes, was submitted to the TELA, and it was again passed with a Category IIB rating. A director's cut of the film, running at 97 minutes, is available on DVD.
