= 29th Hong Kong Film Awards =

2010 Hong Kong Film Awards

- Date: 18 April 2010
- Hosted by: Lawrence Cheng

The 29th Hong Kong Film Awards ceremony took place on 18 April 2010.

Wang Po-chieh's original nomination for the Best New Performer was withdrawn after he was confirmed to be an actor in the 2008 Taiwan film Winds of September. His nomination was replaced by Fala Chen.

== Awards ==
Winners are listed first, highlighted in boldface, and indicated with a double dagger (‡).

**Best Film**: **Bodyguards and Assassins**‡; Red Cliff II; KJ: Music and Life; Shinjuku Incident; Overheard	**Best Director**: **Teddy Chan — Bodyguards and Assassins**‡; Ann Hui — Night and Fog; John Woo — Red Cliff II; Derek Yee — Shinjuku Incident; Alan Mak and Felix Chong — Overheard
**Best Screenplay**: **Alex Law — Echoes of the Rainbow**‡; Guo Junli, Qin Tiannan, Joyce Chan and Chan Tong-Man — Bodyguards and Assassins; Wai Ka-Fai and Au Kin-Yee — Written By; Szeto Kam Yuen, Nicholl Tang and Milkyway Creative Team — Accident; Alan Mak and Felix Chong — Overheard	**Best Actor**: **Simon Yam — Echoes of the Rainbow**‡; Wang Xueqi — Bodyguards and Assassins; Simon Yam — Night and Fog; Aaron Kwok — Murderer; Lau Ching-Wan — Overheard
**Best Actress**: **Kara Wai — At the End of Daybreak**‡; Zhang Jing Chu — Night and Fog; Zhao Wei — Mulan; Shu Qi — Look for a Star; Sandra Ng — Echoes of the Rainbow	**Best Supporting Actor**: **Nicholas Tse — Bodyguards and Assassins**‡; Tony Leung Ka-Fai — Bodyguards and Assassins; Chang Chen — Red Cliff II; Stanley Fung — Accident; Alex Fong — Overheard
**Best Supporting Actress**: **Michelle Ye — Accident**‡; Li Yuchun — Bodyguards and Assassins; Fan Bing Bing — Bodyguards and Assassins; Zhao Wei — Red Cliff II; Denise Ho — Look for a Star	**Best New Performer**: **Aarif Rahman — Echoes of the Rainbow**‡; Fala Chen — Turning Point; Li Yuchun — Bodyguards and Assassins; Océane Zhu — Prince of Tears; Chung Shiu-To — Echoes of the Rainbow
**Best Cinematography**: **Arthur Wong — Bodyguards and Assassins**‡; Anthony Pun — Empire of Silver; Lü Yue and Zhang Li — Red Cliff; Chin Ting-chang — Prince of Tears; Nobuyasu Kita — Shinjuku Incident	**Best Film Editing**: **Kong Chi-Leung and Chan Chi Wai — Overheard**‡; Derek Hui and Wong Hoi — Bodyguards and Assassins; David Wu, Angie Lam and Yang Hong-Yu — Red Cliff II; Cheung King Wai — KJ: Music and Life; David Richardson — Accident
**Best Art Direction**: **Ken Mak — Bodyguards and Assassins**‡; Kenneth Yee, Chang Chi-Ping and Christina Yao — Empire Of Silver; Tim Yip — Red Cliff II; Kenneth Yee and Lau Man-Hung — The Storm Warriors; Yonfan and Andrew Wong — Prince of Tears	**Best Costume Make Up Design**: **Dora Ng Li-Lo — Bodyguards and Assassins**‡; Kenneth Yee, Jessie Dai, Popeye Tam and Man Yung-Ling — Empire of Silver; Tim Yip — Red Cliff II; Kenneth Yee and Dora Ng Li-Lo — The Storm Warriors; Yonfan and Eason Fung — Prince of Tears
**Best Action Choreography**: **Stephen Tung and Lee Tat-Chiu** **— Bodyguards and Assassins**‡; Corey Yuen — Red Cliff II; Ma Yuk-Sing — The Storm Warriors; Chin Ka-lok — Shinjuku Incident; Ku Huen-Chiu — 14 Blades	**Best Original Film Score**: **Comfort Chan and Peter Kam** **— Bodyguards and Assassins**‡; Tarō Iwashiro — Red Cliff II; Yu Yat-Yiu — Prince of Tears; Lo Tayu — Vengeance; Keiichi Tomita — Dance, Subaru!
**Best Original Film Song**: **"Echoes of the Rainbow" — Echoes of the Rainbow**‡; Composer: Lowell Lo; Lyricist: Alex Law; Singer: Aarif Lee; "Powder" — Bodyguards and Assassins; Composer: Chan Kwong-Wing; Lyricist: Chris Shum; Singer: Li Yuchun; "River of No Return" — Red Cliff II; Composer: Taro Iwashiro; Lyricist: Francis Lee; Singer: alan; "Mulan Love" — Mulan; Composer: Li Shih Song; Lyricist: Yee Kar-Yeung; Singer: Stefanie Sun; "McDull, Kungfu Ding Ding Dong" — McDull, Kungfu Ding Ding Dong; Composer: The Pancakes; Lyricist: Brian Tse and The Pancakes; Singers: The Pancakes	**Best Sound Design**: **Steve Burgess and Wu Jiang — Red Cliff II**‡; Kinson Tsang and George Lee — Bodyguards and Assassins; Cheung King Wai and Hidemi Gojo — KJ: Music and Life; Ken Wong, Phyllis Cheng and Lam Siu-Yu — The Storm Warriors; Ken Wong and Phyllis Cheng — 14 Blades
**Best Visual Effects**: **Ng Yuen-Fai, Chas Chau and Tam Kai-Kwan — The Storm Warriors**‡; Ng Yuen-Fai, Chas Chau, Joe Tam and Yung Kwok-Yin — Bodyguards and Assassins; Teddy Mak, Ken Law and Mary Ng — Written By; Craig Hayes — Red Cliff II; Cecil Cheng and Don Ma — Kung Fu Cyborg	**Best New Director**: **King Cheung — KJ: Music and Life**‡; Philip Yung — Glamorous Youth; Roy Chow — Murderer
**Best Asian Film**: **Departures (Japan)**‡; City of Life and Death (China); The Founding of a Republic (China); The Message (China); Ponyo on the Cliff by the Sea (Japan)	**Lifetime Achievement**: **Lau Kar Leung**‡
**Lifetime Professional**: **Chow Lam**‡
