= Let Go for Love =

- Film poster
- Directed by: Aman Chang
- Written by: He Jing; Chen Yiqing; Wang Yiran
- Starring: Chapman To; Charlene Choi
- Release date: 30 April 2014
- Running time: 93 minutes
- Country: China
- Language: Mandarin
- Box office: ¥1.66 million (US$266,000)

Let Go for Love (Chinese: 放手愛) is a 2014 Chinese romantic comedy film directed by Aman Chang.

== Cast ==
- Chapman To
- Charlene Choi

== Reception ==
The film has grossed ¥1.66 million (US$266,000) in China.
