= Under Current =

2025 Hong Kong film by Alan Mak

- Theatrical release poster
- Traditional Chinese: 內幕
- Simplified Chinese: 内幕
- Hanyu Pinyin: Nèi Mù
- Jyutping: Noi6 Mok6
- Directed by: Alan Mak
- Written by: Alan Mak; Lam Fung
- Produced by: Tin Kai-man; Jason Siu
- Starring: Aaron Kwok; Simon Yam; Francis Ng; Alex Fong
- Cinematography: Kenny Tse
- Edited by: Curran Pang
- Music by: Day Tai
- Production company: Emperor Motion Pictures
- Distributed by: Emperor Motion Pictures
- Release date: 6 December 2025
- Running time: 117 minutes
- Country: Hong Kong
- Language: Cantonese

Under Current is a 2025 Hong Kong action thriller film directed by Alan Mak and starring Aaron Kwok, Simon Yam, Francis Ng, and Alex Fong. Kwok stars as a barrister who collaborates with a police officer (Ng) to investigate the mysterious death of a financial director (Yam) of a charity organisation.

Production for Under Current officially began on 6 June 2022, and a poster was released in 2023. The film was theatrically released in Hong Kong on 6 December 2025.

== Plot ==
At an annual gala, chief financial officer Yeung To is suddenly found hanged on stage. At the same time, a huge sum of $200 million disappeared in which Yeung To is publicly accused of for being responsible for the theft. Barrister Ma Ying-fung and police inspector O Ting-pong form a temporary partnership, trying to uncover the layers of hidden truth behind the case and restore justice to society. Ma is reluctant at first to partner with O Ting-Pong, but agrees to help him when he learns that a girl sued by a client he defended in a rape case that he helped exonerate on a technicality commits suicide, followed by her father taking his own life. The guilt prompts Ma to partner up with Or Ting-Pong to follow Yeung To in his last days.

Ma and Or start with finding out Yeung To was investigating the origin of the theft of the $200 million. They discovered he had paid a private investigator to look into the funds. When they seek out the private investigator, they find that the investigator was murdered. Or gets into a fight with the assassin who killed the investigator and tries to catch him, but he escapes.

Meanwhile on the other hand, it is revealed that Ko Sing-Man, the chairman and Yeung To's boss is trying to figure out what happened to the $200 million. He is unable to figure it out and has to meet with his boss, Ka Yuen-kwan to discuss the missing funds. Ko Sing-man decides to publicly blame Yeung To for the missing funds, leading for reporter Kwok Ging Ling to investigate the story. Ma and Or lean that Ko had Yeung try to pay Kwok to stop investigating them as Kwok had been investigating Ko for a while, but she rejected the bribe. They also learn that Yeung To had a disease of Alzheimer's which was why he wanted to investigate the missing funds before he succumbed to it. However, his disease affected his relationship with his long lost family, which included a son. When the story of Ko being the responsible preperator in the $200 million theft pubclily releases, Kwok tries to confront Ko publicly, but he denies fabricating the story and threatens to sue for libel. Ma tries to confront his mentor, Wat King-yin, at his birthday party, who knew Yeung about the missing funds and their firm turning a blind eye towards it, with his daughter Wat Man-Ying, who is also a lawyer and Ma's girlfriend present, who tries to mediate the situation by reminding Ma it's her dad's birthday party, but he leaves in disbelief

Later, Ko is sent on a business trip to the Golden Triangle on the orders of Mr. Ka, in order to make up for the $200 million that belonged to Mr. Noguchi. Ma similarly is tasked to represent Ko by his mentor Wat King-yin, but he initially refuses before he has to agree to go. When they arrive in the golden triangle, Ma follows Ko and finds him meeting with shady connects to restore the money. Ko then leaves in an SUVand Ma follows him via a taxi. En route, Ko gets ambushed and is nearly killed until Ma rescues him. Ma tries to persuade Ko to surrender to the police and offers to represent him. Ko refuses and exits the taxi, meeting up with his assistant, Koo who has him picked up in another car. Koo betrays Ko by telling him he'll get him medicine to disinfect his wounds, where the driver is revealed to be the same killer who killed the private investigator earlier in the movie and shoots Ko.

Ma returns and learns he is under investigation for his client in the rape case accusing him of giving a false statement. He is arrested and learns Ko had died from Or. He then bailed by Man-Ying, who tries to persuade him to stop following the case. Ma refuses and insists to clear Yeung To's name.

Later on, Koo is promoted as the chairman to replace Ko. Kwok confronts him at a public event with new evidence, but he denies it. Or comes in and arrests Koo, as he is put in questioning. Koo then leaves later, under police surveillance. He meets with Mr. Ka the next day to discuss the situation, but as he leaves, he is confronted by Ma, who tries to convince Koo to help the police locate the mastermind, offering to represent him. Koo denies knowledge of this and leaves.

Later during a taekwondo class that Ma is teaching, Koo calls Ma and asks him to come alone. Ma comes with Or outside as backup outside a warehouse Koo asked him to meet at. Ma arrives to find his corpse, killed by the same killer who murdered Ko and Yeung. Ma engages in a fight with the killer, which he almost succeeds until the killer overpowers him and is about to hang him. Or senses something is wrong and drives inside the warehouse, prompting one of the henchmen to shoot causing an explosion. Or helps Ma unhang himself, and shoots at his own car, causing the warehouse to explode and the killer to get engulfed in flames.

Later, Mr. Ka and Mr. Noguchi are arrested, for the theft of the 2 million and ordering the deaths of Yeung, Ko and Koo. Yeung To has his name cleared and Ma is promoted to take over King-yin's place as the head of the firm due to the latter's soon retirement. Ma has a new rule going forward for future clients, to verify whether or not they did the crime, upholding integrity and justice.

== Cast ==
- Aaron Kwok as Ma Ying-fung, a barrister specialized in criminal cases who is also a taekwondo expert
- Simon Yam as Yeung To, the financial director of a charity organization
- Francis Ng as O Ting-pong, a police officer
- Alex Fong as Ko Sing-man, the chairman of a charity organization
- Kathy Yuen as Wan Wai-ling, the manager of a charity organization
- Niki Chow as Wat Man-ying, a lawyer and Ma's girlfriend
- Gladys Li as Kwok King-ling
- Power Chan as Koo Cheuk-wah, Ko Sing-man's assistant
- David Chiang as Wat King-yin, the mentor and boss of Ma
- Felix Lok as Ka Yuen-kwan
- Nina Paw as Tsang Dai-hei
- Kenneth Lai as Siu Chin-hung
- Asano Nagahide as Noguchi
- German Cheung as Killer
- Ernesto de Sousa as auditor 2 / police officer 2
- Max Cheung as Officer Lau
- Peter Chan as Mok Tsz-wing
- Rose Ma as Secretary Mary
- Henry Fong Ping as Yuen Chi-man

== Production ==
The film was first announced in March 2022 at the Hong Kong International Film & TV Market (FILMART) in March under the title Insider, with Alan Mak set to direct and to star Aaron Kwok, Simon Yam, Raymond Lam, Alex Fong, Kathy Yuen, Niki Chow and Gladys Li, with production slated to begin in May of the same year after it was postponed from February amid the fifth wave of the COVID-19 pandemic in Hong Kong. Kwok was originally scheduled to participate in a film produced in Mainland China in June, but because he had a strong interest in the film's script, Kwok rearranged his schedule to act in the film. Mak revealed the script for film took three years to complete On 11 May, it was reported that Lam had dropped out of the film in favor of participating in a reality TV show in China and was replaced by Francis Ng. Mak originally had William Chan in mind to replace Lam, but instead opt for Ng as the character was a middle-aged man with much life experience.

Principal photography for the film, which is now titled Under Current, began on 6 June 2022, where a production commencement ceremony was held attended by the cast and crew, hosted by Emperor Group chairman Albert Yeung.

== Release ==
The film was originally scheduled to be released in 2023, as advertised on its posters and in its trailer, but its release was delayed.

It was later announced that Under Current would receive a theatrical release in mainland China, North America, Malaysia and Hong Kong on 6 December 2025. The film opened through Super Lion Culture Group in mainland China, Chinalion Film Distribution in North America, Brilliant Pictures in Malaysia and Brunei, and Emperor Motion Pictures in Hong Kong. In Singapore, the film was released by Clover Films on 11 December.
