= Nude Fear =

1998 Hong Kong film by Alan Mak

- Film poster
- Traditional Chinese: 追兇20年
- Simplified Chinese: 追凶20年
- Literal meaning: Chasing a Criminal for 20 Years
- Jyutping: Zeoi^{1} Hung^{1} Ji^{6}-sap^{6} Nin^{4}
- Directed by: Alan Mak
- Screenplay by: Chan Suk-yin; Joe Ma
- Produced by: Joe Ma
- Starring: Kathy Chow; Tse Kwan-ho; Cheung Tat-ming; Siu Siu
- Cinematography: Keung Kwok-man
- Edited by: Cheung Ka-fai
- Music by: Chung Chi-wing
- Production company: Brilliant Idea Group
- Release date: 23 April 1998
- Running time: 88 minutes
- Country: Hong Kong
- Language: Cantonese

Nude Fear is a 1998 Hong Kong psychological horror-thriller film directed by Alan Mak, starring Kathy Chow as a homicide detective pursuing a recently resurfaced serial killer who raped and killed her mother 23 years before. The film is Mak's directorial debut.

== Plot ==
Joyce Chan Ching-yee (Kathy Chow), a 28-year-old superintendent of the Homicide Bureau. While investigating a horrific rape-murder, she immediately recognises the killer's modus operandi — it's the same one used by the man who murdered her mother 23 years before. Chan's investigation leads to the capture of Lee Chun-min (Sam Lee), who confesses to the murder of Chan's mother and several other women. Lee was arrested years before, but was released without a trial. As Lee is only 23, Chan is convinced an older serial killer is still on the loose, but the investigation come to an abrupt halt when Lee kills himself.

A confused young girl (Siu Siu), whom psychiatrists believe has been imprisoned, is unable to tell anyone who she is. However, she has a photo of Chan, who doesn't recognise her. Chan receives a phone call from the girl's captor and realises he has intentionally released the girl. The serial killer then arrives at Chan's apartment, kills three detectives, and captures and taunts Chan, but does not kill her. Despite not having seen his face, Chan is convinced from the encounter he works in the police department. Soon, Officer Cheung Chi-chuen (Chan Wing-fai) is arrested, and the girl identifies him in a lineup. Before trial, Cheung is stabbed to death by the father of one of the victims.

The case is now closed, and the girl, having been identified as Cheung Sze-mei, reunites with her parents who lost her 12 years ago. Officer Wong Wing-nin (Tse Kwan-ho) of the Public Relation Bureau arrives at Chan's apartment to celebrate. Chan and Wong make love after a few drinks. While Wong is in the shower, Chan accidentally picks up his phone, and hears the voice of "Cheung Sze-mei". At the same time, Chan's assistant (Cheung Tat-ming) discovers it was Wong who many years ago secured Lee's release - and realizes that Wong is the killer.

== Cast ==
- Kathy Chow as Joyce Chan Ching-yee
- Tse Kwan-ho as Wong Wing-nin
- Cheung Tat-ming as Chan's assistant
- Sam Lee as Lee Chun-min
- Siu Siu as the little girl
