= The Floating Landscape =

2003 Hong Kong-French film by Carol Lai

The Floating Landscapes
- DVD cover
- Traditional Chinese: 戀之風景
- Simplified Chinese: 恋之风景
- Hanyu Pinyin: Liàn Zhī Fēng Jǐng
- Jyutping: Lyun2 Zi1 Fung1 Ging2
- Directed by: Carol Lai
- Screenplay by: Carol Lai; Lai Ho
- Produced by: Stanley Kwan; Ueda Makoto; Christine Ravet; Sylvain Bursztejn; Arthur Wong
- Starring: Ekin Cheng; Karena Lam; Liu Ye
- Cinematography: Arthur Wong
- Edited by: Carol Lai; Danny Pang Phat
- Music by: Shigeru Umebayashi
- Production companies: Sil-Metropole Organisation; Filmko Pictures
- Release date: 16 October 2003
- Running time: 100 minutes
- Countries: Hong Kong; France
- Language: Cantonese

The Floating Landscape is a 2003 romance film written and directed by Carol Lai and starring Ekin Cheng, Karena Lam and Liu Ye. A Hong Kong-French co-production, the film was shown in competition for the Golden Lion at the 60th Venice International Film Festival.

== Plot ==
Man, haunted by the death of her lover, Sam, struggles to accept a new life. She goes to Qingdao in search of the landscape that her lover spoke of in his final days. There, she meets a young postman, Lit, who runs along with Man every day in the landscape search. While Lit gradually falls for Man's beauty and passion, she can only think of her lost-lover and the painting

== Cast ==
- Karena Lam as Man
- Ekin Cheng as Sam
- Liu Ye as Lit
- CoCo Su as Landlady Tung
- Huang Jue as Wu
- Chan Wing-chiu as Gallery manager
- Keely as Bride
- Fiona Lee as Bridesmaid
- Middi Yau as Lady on phone in hospital
- Amy Lam as Funeral make-up artist
- Wu Ji-wen as Tung's old neighbor
- Huang Suying as Tung's old neighbor
- He Yongsheng as Postman Mick
- Li Xiao as Gold Fish Dung (11 years old)
- Dong Zhihao as Boy receiving letter
- Wang Zirong as Girl hiding behind tree
- Hao Yun as Girl sending letter
- Zhou Kong as Hair-cut girl
- Xue Shuai as Dong
- Jiang Tao as New postman
- Wu Zhangxu as Landlady Tung's boyfriend
- Yu Fengqi as Hair-cut old man A
- Yin Chun-ting as Hair-cut old man B
- Liu Xiaobin as Bridegroom
- Fan Lun as Bride
- Yang Lei as Best man
- Wong Koon as Bridesmaid
- Chai Wong as Bride's girlfriend
- Li Yuanqing as Flower hawker
- Xue Shuyin as Flower woman customer
- Li Weiqing as Hair-cut customer
- Xu Li as Perm hair customer
- Wu Ge as Taxi Driver
- Chan Wai-keung as Van driver
- Li Linjing as Scarf girl
- Hu Kun as Drawing boy
- Lu Ming as Drawing boy's father
- Ma Zhuren as Female doctor
- Cheng Shu-tao as Nurse
- Du Huanhuan as Nurse
- Feng Yani as Nurse
- Qin Hua as Nurse
- Joyce Keung as Ambulance nurse
- Jiao Xin as Ambulance nurse
- Qi Baohui as Ambulance nurse
- Xu Yuedong as Postman
- Zhang Chunhua as Postman
- Jiang Hua as Postman
- Jiang Xiaokun as Postman
- Liu Chen as Postman
- Liu Yuanjia as Postman
- Hou Chengmin as Postman
- Guan Jianmin as Postman
- HUnag Huimin as Battledore team member
- Song Jianguo as Battledore team member
- Zhou Wei as Battledore team member
- Yao Kuiguang as Battledore team member
- Zhang Shenghong as Battledore team member
- Yang Lin as Battledore team member
- Liu Tao as Battledore team member
- Yan Bo as Battledore team member
- Song Jianyong as Battledore team member
- Wang Shuzhong as Battledore team member

== Awards and nominations ==
Awards and nominations
Ceremony	Category	Recipient	Outcome
23rd Hong Kong Film Awards	Best Actress	Karena Lam	Nominated
23rd Hong Kong Film Awards	Best New Director	Carol Lai	Nominated
23rd Hong Kong Film Awards	Best Cinematography	Arthur Wong	Won
23rd Hong Kong Film Awards	Best Art Direction	Ben Luk	Nominated
23rd Hong Kong Film Awards	Best Costume Make Up Design	William Chang	Nominated
60th Venice International Film Festival	Golden Lion	Carol Lai	Nominated
