= Moonlight in Tokyo =

2005 Hong Kong film by Alan Mak and Felix Chong

- Theatrical release poster
- Traditional Chinese: 情義我心知
- Hanyu Pinyin: Ching yi ngor sum gi
- Directed by: Alan Mak; Felix Chong
- Screenplay by: Alan Mak; Felix Chong
- Story by: Sin-Ji Chan
- Produced by: Andrew Lau Wai-Keung
- Starring: Leon Lai; Chapman To
- Cinematography: Andrew Lau Wai-Keung
- Edited by: Chung Wai-Chiu
- Production company: Media Asia Film Company Limited
- Release date: 29 December 2005; (Hong Kong)
- Running time: 95 minutes
- Country: Hong Kong
- Language: Cantonese
- Box office: HK$9,417,992

Moonlight in Tokyo (Chinese: 情義我心知; pinyin: Ching yi ngor sum gi) is a 2005 Hong Kong comedy-drama film written and directed by Alan Mak and Felix Chong. It is the directorial debut of Felix Chong.

== Plot ==
Jun, a man with a learning disability, feels like he is a burden on his family in Hong Kong and runs away to Shinjuku. He encounters, Hoi, a struggling pimp who has gotten into debt with the loan shark Kano, and claims to know him from elementary school. Hoi's boss Yan, a madam, notices Jun's good looks and suggests employing him as a gigolo. The arrangement is successful, particularly because Jun's hugs bring people happiness, but its profitability causes Kano to demand half of the earnings from Hoi. They publish pictures of Kano's wife with Jun, causing Kano to shoot his gun at his wife, accidentally hitting a policeman. Kano flees and goes into hiding.

One of Jun's other customers, Mr. Li, is a man who watches Jun with his wife, but after one encounter he has an argument and throws his wife from a balcony, killing her. Mr. Li accuses Jun of the murder, causing Jun and Hoi to go on the run because Jun is afraid to talk to the police. Jun says that his fear is due to an incident from their youth when Hoi knocked over a plant and injured a woman who blamed in on Jun and got him sent to a specialist who diagnosed him as retarded. Jun traces his problems with his family back to his encounter with the police and therefore fears them. Hoi goes to the police and tricks Mr. Li into confessing by pretending to have video of Jun pleasuring Mr. Li's wife.

Kano finds them and kills Jun but is shot and killed by the police before he can kill Hoi. Hoi is unable to find any record of Jun being a former classmate of his and is left wondering if his memory is in doubt or if Jun was mistaken from the start.

== Cast ==
- Leon Lai as Li Tze-Jun
- Chapman To as Wong Hoi
- Yang Kuei-Mei as Yan
- Michelle Ye as Lu
- Roy Cheung as Mr. Li
- Hiro Hayama as Shing
- Chie Tanaka as Yoshiko
- Masazumi Nitanda as Kano
- Natsuo Yuna as Kano's wife
- Eriko Moriwaki as Mrs. Li
- Ken Watanabe as Inspector
- Lee Ka-Wing as Jun's younger brother
- Rensen Chan Man-Kong as Jun's elder brother
- Choi Jing-Man as Jun's sister
- Michelle Wong Cheuk-Ying as Jun's sister-in-law
- Michiko Iwahashi as Hostess #1
- Misato Hamada as Hostess #2
- Kyoko as Hostess #4
- Takeuchi Yoshitaka as Customer in bathhouse #2
- Terumi Norizuki as Jun's housewife customer
- Kyo Sasaki as Noodle shop owner
- Keiki Takenouchi as Wounded policeman
- Ronald Wong Ban as Dr. Hui
- Takahiro Hirano as Kano's Man #1
- Jin Chikamatsu as Kano's Man #3
- Haruko Satsuki as Old Woman

== Production ==
The film was shot on location in Tokyo.

== Release ==
The film had a theatrical run in Hong Kong from 29 29 December 2005 to 26 January 2006, earning HK$9,417,992.

== Reception ==
In a review for lovehkfilm.com, reviewer Kozo wrote, "Given 2005's terrible Hong Kong Cinema output (a Top 10 might have to be truncated to a Top 6 to insure some level of quality), Moonlight in Tokyo is easily one of the year's better films, and a movie that absolutely surpasses its immediate expectations. Hell, we'll even say it's good."

In a review for heroic-cinema.com, reviewer Eugene wrote, "Moonlight in Tokyo is certainly an enjoyable film with characters that will engage you for the length of the film, while the occasional scene provides a healthy dose of surrealism to break the drama from becoming something that is simply too much."

Reviewer Andrew (Neo) of thehkneo.com rated the film 9.5 out of 10, writing, "Moonlight in Tokyo isn't exactly damn ass original, but it has this very distinctive HK feel to it that most movies nowadays seems to have lost or gone into Hollywood mayhem. Hardly is there a film that is so easy to watch yet at the same time - filled with meaningful parodies and not so meaningful dark moments. The ending is dark, yet extremely inspiring in a shocking surprise manner." The reviewer concluded that the film is "one of the best 2005 have to offer."

Reviewer Kenneth Brorsson of sogoodreviews.com wrote, "Moonlight In Tokyo deals with characters and emotions at its core but is still a true cinematic experience. This means rule bending of the grave kind which is something audiences tend to hate with a vengeance. Some can't stand to be jerked around but Alan Mak and Felix Chong clearly do not care for that closed up audience."

Reviewer John Li of moviexclusive.com wrote, "As the entire movie was shot on location in Tokyo, one can expect dazzling lights and visually pleasing displays throughout the movie. Unfortunately, these brilliant lights in Tokyo are not enough to cover up for the slipshod storytelling and Lai's jarring performance."

== Award nominations ==
Michelle Ye was nominated for the Hong Kong Film Award for Best New Performer at the 25th Hong Kong Film Awards.

Chapman To was nominated for the Golden Horse Award for Best Supporting Actor at the 43rd Golden Horse Awards.
