= Infernal Affairs III =

2003 Hong Kong crime drama film

- Theatrical release poster

Chinese name
- Traditional Chinese: 無間道III：終極無間
- Simplified Chinese: 无间道III：终极无间
Transcriptions
- Directed by: Andrew Lau; Alan Mak
- Written by: Felix Chong; Alan Mak
- Produced by: Andrew Lau
- Starring: Andy Lau; Tony Leung; Leon Lai; Chen Daoming; Kelly Chen; Anthony Wong; Eric Tsang
- Cinematography: Andrew Lau; Ng Man-ching
- Edited by: Danny Pang; Curran Pang
- Music by: Chan Kwong-wing
- Production companies: Media Asia Films; Tianjin Film Studio; Eastern Dragon Film Co.; CMC Group; Basic Pictures
- Distributed by: Media Asia Distribution
- Release date: 12 December 2003
- Running time: 118 minutes
- Country: Hong Kong
- Languages: Cantonese; Mandarin
- Box office: US$4.47 million

Infernal Affairs III
- Traditional Chinese: 無間道III：終極無間
- Simplified Chinese: 无间道III：终极无间
Transcriptions
Standard Mandarin
- Hanyu Pinyin: Wú Jiān Dào Sān: Zhōng Jí Wú Jiān
Yue: Cantonese
- Jyutping: Mou4 Gaan3 Dou6 Saam1: Zung1 Gik6 Mou4 Gaan3

Infernal Affairs III is a 2003 Hong Kong crime drama film directed by Andrew Lau and Alan Mak. It is the third and final installment in the Infernal Affairs film series, and is both a sequel and a semi-prequel to the original film, as it intercuts events before and after the events in the first film. Andy Lau, Tony Leung, Kelly Chen, Anthony Wong, Eric Tsang, and Chapman To reprise their roles again, joined by new cast members Leon Lai and Chen Daoming.

Infernal Affairs III received mixed to positive reviews, grossed $4.5 million and was nominated for seven Hong Kong Film Awards.

There are two cuts of the film, both available on DVD: a 107-minute version which was released in Hong Kong theatres, and a 118-minute version, which is the directors' cut.

== Plot ==
Infernal Affairs III uses parallel storytelling, flashing between the past and the present.

=== Six months before Chan's death ===
Undercover Hong Kong Police Force officer Chan Wing-Yan seeks to uncover the link between Hong Kong Triad boss Hon Sam and the mysterious Mainland Chinese gang leader Shen Cheng. Since Hon's ascension to the seat of triad boss was due to the death of his predecessor, Ngai Wing-Hau, (Note: As depicted in Infernal Affairs II) Hon is suspicious of all his men for fear they might usurp his position. He tests Chan's loyalty by ordering him to smash an ashtray on Shen's brother during a negotiation, resulting in Chan's arrest by Inspector Yeung Kam-Wing. Yeung tells Chan that though Chan does not recognise him, he recognises Chan and he warns the latter to "be careful". Chan is released after both Hon and Shen fetch him at police headquarters.

Concurrently, Chan is prosecuted for violent behaviour. His superior, Superintendent Wong Chi-shing, persuades the court to allow Chan to seek therapy, leading him to meet therapist Lee Sum-Yee. Hon asks Chan to deliver arms to Shen, but he and other triad members do not show up. When Chan delivers the cargo, Shen's men discover that the boxes are empty and open fire on Chan; Shen and Chan shoot each other in the limbs during the crossfire. Shen finds out that Chan is an undercover cop when Yeung unexpectedly arrives on the scene. Yeung tells Chan that Shen is also an undercover cop working for the Mainland authorities. Yeung also tells Chan that he gained top honours when he was in the police academy due to Chan's "expulsion". The three shake hands, wait for the chaos to subside, then leave.

=== Ten months after Chan's death ===
Senior Inspector Lau Kin-Ming, Hon's ex-mole in the Hong Kong Police Force, has been demoted to administrative duty pending an investigation into the deaths of Chan and Inspector Big-B, who unknown to rest of the police force is also a mole sent by Hon. He falsely claims that Big-B shot Chan in the head while holding him hostage, and that he killed Big-B in retaliation. After months of investigation, Lau is reinstated back to Internal Affairs, where he struggles to conceal his criminal past and protect his true identity. Lau later learns that Hon had previously planted five other moles in the police force, one of whom might be a fellow Security Division Inspector, Yeung. A battle of wits develops between Lau and Yeung, as each of them tries to discover the other's secret.

Meanwhile, Lau suffers from an identity collapse as he loses track of reality, wrestling with guilt over Chan's death and grappling with his impending divorce from his wife, Mary. His psychological trauma deteriorates to the point where he begins to see himself as Chan. As "Chan", Lau makes it a personal mission to apprehend Yeung, whom he sees as his former self. After witnessing an incident where Lau suffers a hallucination, Lee conducts a hypnosis on him and finds out that he was Hon's spy. Lau realises his folly and knocks Lee unconscious before escaping.

Lau steals tapes from Yeung's office safe, using spy cameras to determine the code. He thinks he hears recordings of Yeung relating information to Hon, and leads his Internal Affairs team to the Security Division to arrest Yeung just as Shen arrives. Lau plays one of the tape recordings, which is actually a conversation between him and Hon. When Lau's second-in-command tries to arrest him instead, Lau panics and draws his gun, killing Yeung. He is immediately shot by Shen and attempts suicide by shooting himself in the neck. During a search of Lau's office, a tape is found in his safe and played. It is a recording of the song sung by Tsai Chin, given to him by Hon's wife.

=== Eleven months after Chan's death ===
A series of flashbacks play: immediately after Chan's death, Shen and Yeung meet, where Shen reveal his suspicion of Lau. Yeung breaks into Lau's office to find tape recordings of Lau's conversations with Hon, proving that Shen is right.

Yeung is buried next to Chan in the police cemetery. Shen and Lee visit the graves and Shen says to Lee: "Events change men, but men do not change events. But these two men are extraordinary because they changed events."

Lau ends up crippled and catatonic, lost inside his own mind, haunted by the spirit of Mary (Hon Sam's wife, whom he had a crush on in Infernal Affairs II) and locked in his own "continuous hell". His divorced wife Mary visits and tells him, "Our baby can say "papa" now." Before the picture fades into the next scene, the camera pans down onto Lau's fingers tapping out in Morse code, "H-E-L..." (and then the start of another 'L' as the picture dims).

Before the film ends, there is one final flashback to the hi-fi shop scene in Infernal Affairs, where Lau is buying an audio system from Chan.

== Cast ==
- Andy Lau as Senior Inspector Lau Kin-Ming (劉健明), an ex-Triad spy in the Hong Kong Police Force who tries to cover his criminal past and remain as a cop.
  - Edison Chen as young Lau Kin-Ming
- Tony Leung as Chan Wing-Yan (陳永仁), an undercover Hong Kong Police Force officer in the Triad. He was killed by Inspector B in the first film.
  - Shawn Yue as young Chan Wing-Yan
- Leon Lai as Superintendent Yeung Kam-Wing (楊錦榮), Lau's rival in the police force.
  - Eddie Li as young Yeung Kam-Wing
- Chen Daoming as "Shadow" Shen Cheng (沈澄), a Mainland Chinese gang leader who is actually an undercover cop.
- Kelly Chen as Lee Sum-Yee (李心兒), Chan's therapist and love interest.
- Anthony Wong as Superintendent Wong Chi-Shing (黃志誠), Chan's superior. He was killed by Hon Sam's henchmen in the first film.
- Eric Tsang as Hon Sam (韓琛), the Triad boss. He was killed by Lau in the first film.
- Chapman To as "Silly" Keung (傻強), Hon's henchman. He was killed in the first film.
- Berg Ng as Inspector Cheung (張Sir), Lau's second-in-command.
- Wan Chi-keung as Officer Leung (梁Sir), Chief Superintendent.
- Gordon Lam as Inspector B (大B; Big B), the Triad spy who killed Chan in the first film. He was killed by Lau after revealing his true identity.
- Sammi Cheng as Mary, Lau's wife.
- Carina Lau as Mary, Hon Sam's wife, whom Lau had a crush on. She was mowed down by a car in the second film.
- Huang Zhizhong as Shen Liang (沈亮), Shen Cheng's younger brother who was injured by Chan.
- Waise Lee as Sergeant Chan Chun (陳俊), one of Hon's spies in the police force. He commits suicide in front of Yeung.

== Music ==
The film's score was composed by Chan Kwong-wing. The theme song, Road to Inferno (自作自受; Zi Zuo Zi Shou), was composed by Andy Lau, Chan Tak-kin and Wan Ho-kit, lyrics provided by Andy Lau, and performed by Hacken Lee. Lau also sang an alternate version of the song.

== Reception ==
Despite grossing higher than the second film at the Hong Kong box office with HK$30,225,661 (over HK$5 million more than Infernal Affairs II), Infernal Affairs III is less critically successful than the former.

In his review of the film, Ed Gonzalez from Slant Magazine described it as a "jumpy, unnecessary sequel". He writes, "As overstuffed as the second film and as melodramatic as the first, it lacks the grace of the former and the whiz-bang poetry of the first film’s better sequences. Like The Godfather III, it seemingly exists to buff its predecessors’ rough spots but only tarnishes their memories."

Derek Elley from Variety noted its use of "copious flashbacks" and its rushed ending, writing that "there’s a growing sense of the writers thrashing around to provide a finale. This finally comes, though in bits and pieces, capped by an endless series of datelines (“seven months later,” etc.) that’s borderline self-parody." He expressed that the film "is best experienced as a free riff on the previous two movies, not as a grand climax to the trilogy," and that the technical aspects "are at their smoothest, though far from the striking originality of the first movie."

Manfred Selzer from AsianMovieWeb gave the film a rating of 7 out of 8, praising it for delivering "a big deal of thrill, tension and has a great story to hold everything together, which makes the third part, too, a movie experience," although he felt that "the finale feels a bit like a neverending epilogue, which didn't know where to find an end."

Ross Chen from LoveHKFilm wrote that "Infernal Affairs III is not tightly crafted like the first film, nor meaty and dramatic like the second." Despite being surprised by its creative narrative, he found "more than a few massive plot holes which simply do not hold up on closer inspection." He also writes that the star-studded cast "is one of the things that makes it enjoyable, if not too egregiously commercial."

== Awards ==
List of Accolades
Award / Film Festival	Category	Recipient(s)	Result
41st Golden Horse Awards	Best Actor	Andy Lau	Won
23rd Hong Kong Film Awards	Best Film	Infernal Affairs III	Nominated
23rd Hong Kong Film Awards	Best Screenplay	Alan Mak, Felix Chong	Nominated
23rd Hong Kong Film Awards	Best Cinematography	Andrew Lau, Ng Man-ching	Nominated
23rd Hong Kong Film Awards	Best Film Editing	Danny Pang, Curran Pang	Nominated
23rd Hong Kong Film Awards	Best Original Film Score	Chan Kwong-wing	Nominated
23rd Hong Kong Film Awards	Best Sound Effects	Kinson Tsang	Nominated
23rd Hong Kong Film Awards	Best Visual Effects	Eddy Wong, Victor Wong	Nominated
9th Golden Bauhinia Awards	Best Film	Infernal Affairs III	Nominated
9th Golden Bauhinia Awards	Best Director	Andrew Lau, Alan Mak	Nominated
9th Golden Bauhinia Awards	Best Actor	Andy Lau	Nominated
9th Golden Bauhinia Awards	Top 10 Chinese-language Film	Infernal Affairs III	Won
10th Hong Kong Film Critics Society Award	Film of Merit	Infernal Affairs III	Won
4th Chinese Film Media Awards	Media Critics' Award	Infernal Affairs III	Nominated
4th Chinese Film Media Awards	Outstanding Film	Infernal Affairs III	Won
4th Chinese Film Media Awards	Outstanding Actor	Tony Leung	Gold Award
4th Chinese Film Media Awards	Outstanding Actor	Andy Lau	Silver Award

== See also ==
- Infernal Affairs
- Infernal Affairs II
- Cinema of Hong Kong
- List of Hong Kong films
- List of movies set in Hong Kong
- Andy Lau filmography
