= Alan Mak (director) =

Hong Kong actor, writer and director (born 1965)

- Born: 1 January 1965 (age 61); British Hong Kong
- Occupations: Writer, director, actor, producer
- Awards: Hong Kong Film Awards – Best Director; 2002 Infernal Affairs; Best Screenplay; 2002 Infernal Affairs; Best Screenplay; 2014 Overheard 3 Golden Bauhinia Awards – Best Director; 2002 Infernal Affairs; Best Screenplay; 2002 Infernal Affairs Hong Kong Film Critics Society Awards – Best Director; 2009 Overheard Golden Horse Awards – Best Director; 2002 Infernal Affairs

Alan Mak
- Traditional Chinese: 麥兆輝
- Simplified Chinese: 麦兆辉
Transcriptions
Standard Mandarin
- Hanyu Pinyin: Mài Zhàohuī
Yue: Cantonese
- Jyutping: mak6 siu6 fai1

Alan Mak Siu-fai (Chinese: 麥兆輝; born 1 January 1965), is a Hong Kong writer, director, actor and producer. He is best known for collaborating with director Andrew Lau and screenwriter Felix Chong on the Infernal Affairs film series (2002–2003).

== Early life ==
In 1965, Mak was born in Hong Kong.

== Education ==
In 1986, Mak studied at the School of Drama in the Hong Kong Academy for Performing Arts. Upon graduation in 1990, he started his movie career.

== Career ==
Mak made his directorial debut in 1997, with his first film being Nude Fear, which was written and produced by Joe Ma. After that, Mak directed further films such as Rave Fever, A War Named Desire, Final Romance and Stolen Love, which would be his first collaboration with writer Felix Chong.

In 2002, Mak and Chong wrote their first script together. The movie was Infernal Affairs, which was produced by Mak's directing partner, Andrew Lau, who also served as cinematographer. Lau and Mak also served as directors for the film, and it would be the first of many collaborations involving the directing duo.

Infernal Affairs starred the four top actors of its year—Andy Lau, Tony Leung Chiu-Wai, Eric Tsang and Anthony Wong—along with the year's two top actresses—Kelly Chen and Sammi Cheng. Infernal Affairs was the number one box-office hit in Hong Kong that year, breaking several box office records alone. Furthermore, the film won many Hong Kong Film Awards, including Best Picture, Best Directors (Lau and Mak), Best Screenplay (Mak and co-writer Chong), and Best Supporting Actor (Wong). Infernal Affairs also went on win awards at the 40th Golden Horse Awards and the Golden Bauhinia Awards.

In 2003, Lau and Mak completed the trilogy with the prequel Infernal Affairs II and the sequel/prequel Infernal Affairs III. That same year, Mak received the 2003 Leader of the Year award in the Sports/Culture/Entertainment category.

In 2004, Lau and Mak worked on another blockbuster, Initial D, which was shot in Japan and released in Hong Kong during the summer. Once again, it was also another successful film for Lau and Mak, winning multiple awards at the Hong Kong Film Awards, winning for Best New Performer (Jay Chou), Best Supporting Actor (Anthony Wong Chau Sang| Anthony Wong), and Best Visual Effects.

In 2006, Lau, Mak and scriptwriter Felix Chong re-teamed to make the 2005 film, Moonlight in Tokyo. They re-teamed again for the 2006 film Confession of Pain, once again re-teaming with Infernal Affairs star Tony Leung Chiu-Wai. He also created The Silent War.

Mak's next film was Lady Cop & Papa Crook which he co-wrote and co-directed with Felix Chong. The film was released in 2008 and marked the feature-film return of Sammi Cheng after a three-year hiatus.

He has worked solidly since then releasing films up until 2019's Integrity. His next film Justices Seeker is in post-production.

== Filmography ==
Year	Title	Credited as		Collaboration with Chong	Collaboration with Lau	Ref.
Year	Title	Director	Writer	Collaboration with Chong	Collaboration with Lau	Ref.
1998	Nude Fear	Yes	No	No	No	
1999	Rave Fever	Yes	No	No	No	
2000	A War Named Desire	Yes	Yes	No	No	
2001	Final Romance	Yes	No	No	No	
2001	Stolen Love	Yes	No	Yes	No	
2002	Infernal Affairs	Yes	Yes	Yes	Yes	
2003	Infernal Affairs II	Yes	Yes	Yes	Yes	
2003	Infernal Affairs III	Yes	Yes	Yes	Yes	
2005	Initial D	Yes	No	Yes	Yes	
2005	Moonlight in Tokyo	Yes	Yes	Yes	No	
2006	Confession of Pain	Yes	Yes	Yes	Yes	
2008	Lady Cop & Papa Crook	Yes	Yes	Yes	No	
2009	Overheard	Yes	Yes	Yes	No	
2011	The Lost Bladesman	Yes	Yes	Yes	No	
2011	Overheard 2	Yes	Yes	Yes	No	
2012	The Silent War	Yes	Yes	Yes	No	
2014	Overheard 3	Yes	Yes	Yes	No	
2017	Extraordinary Mission	Yes	No	Yes	No	
2019	Integrity	Yes	Yes	Yes	No	
2023	The Procurator	Yes	Yes	No	No	
2025	Under Current	Yes	Yes	No	No	

=== As actor ===
- Two Thumbs Up (2015) as Tsui Po-on (徐步安)
- I Am Somebody (2015)

== Awards and nominations ==
Year	Film	Awards and Nominations	Occasion
2010	Overheard (2009)	Nominated: Best Director Shared with Felix Chong	29th Hong Kong Film Awards
2010	Overheard (2009)	Nominated: Screenplay Shared with Felix Chong	29th Hong Kong Film Awards
