= Felix Chong =

Hong Kong film director and screenwriter (born 1968)

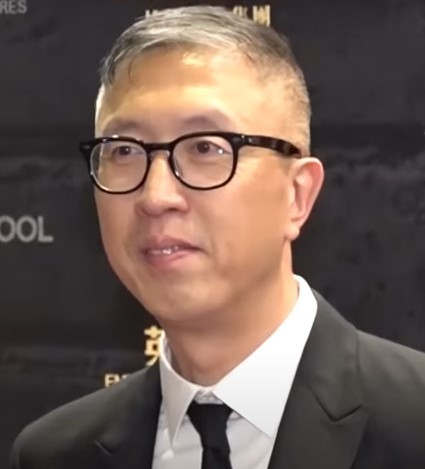
- Chong at a press conference with the crew of the film Project Gutenberg on 14 April 2019, after the 38th Hong Kong Film Awards.
- Born: January 1, 1968 (age 58); British Hong Kong
- Awards: Hong Kong Film Awards – Best Screenplay; 2002 Infernal Affairs; Best Screenplay; 2014 Overheard 3 Golden Bauhinia Awards – Best Screenplay; 2002 Infernal Affairs

Chinese name
- Traditional Chinese: 莊文強
- Simplified Chinese: 庄文强
Transcriptions
Standard Mandarin
- Hanyu Pinyin: Zhuāng Wénqiáng
Yue: Cantonese
- Jyutping: zong1 man4 koeng4

Felix Chong Man-keung (traditional Chinese: 莊文強; simplified Chinese: 庄文强; Jyutping: zong1 man4 koeng4, born January 1, 1968) is a Hong Kong screenwriter, film director and actor.

He is one of the most celebrated screenwriters in Hong Kong and has won several prestigious awards at the Hong Kong Film Awards. Chong is known for frequently working alongside cinematographer/director Andrew Lau and writer/director Alan Mak.

Chong's best known film as a screenwriter is Infernal Affairs (2002), which he co-wrote alongside Alan Mak. Other films written by Chong include Infernal Affairs 2 and Infernal Affairs 3 (both 2003), Initial D (2005), and Confession of Pain (2006).

In 2018, he wrote and directed the film Project Gutenberg, starring Chow Yun-fat and Aaron Kwok.

In February 2021, Chong was announced to write and direct the 2023 film The Goldfinger, backed by Emperor Motion Pictures and mainland Chinese partners.

== Filmography ==
| Year | Title | Credited as | | Collaboration with Lau | Collaboration with Mak |
| Year | Title | Director | Writer | Collaboration with Lau | Collaboration with Mak |
|---|---|---|---|---|---|
| 1999 | The Sunshine Cops | No | Yes | No | No |
| 2000 | Gen-Y Cops | No | Yes | No | No |
| 2000 | Tokyo Raiders | No | Yes | No | No |
| 2001 | Dance of a Dream | No | Yes | No | No |
| 2001 | Stolen Love | No | Yes | No | Yes |
| 2001 | Shadow | No | Yes | No | No |
| 2002 | Infernal Affairs | No | Yes | Yes | Yes |
| 2003 | Infernal Affairs II | No | Yes | Yes | Yes |
| 2003 | Infernal Affairs III | No | Yes | Yes | Yes |
| 2003 | Cat and Mouse | No | Yes | No | No |
| 2005 | Initial D | No | Yes | Yes | Yes |
| 2005 | Moonlight in Tokyo | Yes | Yes | No | Yes |
| 2006 | Confession of Pain | No | Yes | Yes | Yes |
| 2008 | Lady Cop & Papa Crook | Yes | Yes | No | Yes |
| 2009 | Overheard | Yes | Yes | No | Yes |
| 2010 | Once a Gangster | Yes | No | No | Yes |
| 2011 | The Lost Bladesman | Yes | Yes | No | Yes |
| 2011 | Overheard 2 | Yes | Yes | No | Yes |
| 2012 | The Silent War | Yes | Yes | No | Yes |
| 2014 | Overheard 3 | Yes | Yes | No | Yes |
| 2018 | Project Gutenberg | Yes | Yes | No | No |
| 2023 | One More Chance | No | Yes | No | No |
| 2023 | The Goldfinger | Yes | Yes | No | No |

=== As producer ===
- Integrity (2019)

== Awards and nominations ==
| Award ceremony | Year | Category | Nominated work | Result | Ref. |
|---|---|---|---|---|---|
| Golden Bauhinia Awards | 2003 | Best Screenplay (shared with Alan Mak) | Infernal Affairs | Won | |
| Golden Horse Film Festival and Awards | 2003 | Best Original Screenplay (shared with Alan Mak) | Infernal Affairs | Nominated | |
| Golden Horse Film Festival and Awards | 2005 | Best Adapted Screenplay | Initial D | Nominated | |
| Hong Kong Film Awards | 2003 | Best Screenplay (shared with Alan Mak) | Infernal Affairs | Won | |
| Hong Kong Film Awards | 2004 | Best Screenplay (shared with Alan Mak) | Infernal Affairs II | Nominated | |
| Hong Kong Film Awards | 2004 | Best Screenplay (shared with Alan Mak) | Infernal Affairs III | Nominated | |
| Hong Kong Film Awards | 2007 | Best Screenplay (shared with Alan Mak) | Confession of Pain | Nominated | |
| Hong Kong Film Awards | 2010 | Best Director (shared with Alan Mak) | Overhead | Nominated | |
| Hong Kong Film Awards | 2010 | Best Screenplay (shared with Alan Mak) | Overhead | Nominated | |
| Hong Kong Film Awards | 2012 | Best Director (shared with Alan Mak) | Overheard 2 | Nominated | |
| Hong Kong Film Awards | 2012 | Best Screenplay (shared with Alan Mak) | Overheard 2 | Nominated | |
| Hong Kong Film Awards | 2013 | Best Screenplay (shared with Alan Mak) | The Silent War | Nominated | |
| Hong Kong Film Awards | 2015 | Best Director (shared with Alan Mak) | Overheard 3 | Won | |
| Hong Kong Film Awards | 2015 | Best Screenplay (shared with Alan Mak) | Overheard 3 | Nominated | |
| Hong Kong Film Awards | 2019 | Best Director | Project Gutenberg | Won | |
| Hong Kong Film Awards | 2019 | Best Screenplay | Project Gutenberg | Won | |
| Hong Kong Film Awards | 2024 | Best Director | The Goldfinger | Nominated | |
| Hong Kong Film Awards | 2024 | Best Screenplay | The Goldfinger | Nominated | |
