= Infernal Affairs II =

2003 Hong Kong film by Andrew Lau and Alan Mak

- Theatrical release poster

Chinese name
- Traditional Chinese: 無間道II
- Simplified Chinese: 无间道II
Transcriptions
- Directed by: Andrew Lau; Alan Mak
- Written by: Felix Chong; Alan Mak
- Produced by: Andrew Lau
- Starring: Anthony Wong; Eric Tsang; Edison Chen; Shawn Yue; Chapman To; Carina Lau; Francis Ng; Hu Jun; Roy Cheung
- Cinematography: Andrew Lau; Ng Man Ching
- Edited by: Danny Pang; Curran Pang
- Music by: Chan Kwong-wing
- Production companies: Media Asia Films; Mediacorp Raintree Pictures; Eastern Dragon Film Co.; Basic Pictures
- Distributed by: Media Asia Distribution
- Release date: 1 October 2003
- Running time: 119 minutes
- Country: Hong Kong
- Language: Cantonese
- Box office: HK$24,919,376

Infernal Affairs II
- Traditional Chinese: 無間道II
- Simplified Chinese: 无间道II
Transcriptions
Standard Mandarin
- Hanyu Pinyin: Wú Jiān Dào Er
Yue: Cantonese
- Jyutping: Mou4 Gaan3 Dou6 Ji6

Infernal Affairs II is a 2003 Hong Kong crime drama film directed by Andrew Lau and Alan Mak. It is a prequel to the 2002 film Infernal Affairs. Anthony Wong, Eric Tsang, Edison Chen, Shawn Yue and Chapman To reprise their roles from the original film alongside new cast members Carina Lau, Francis Ng, Hu Jun and Roy Cheung. Neither Andy Lau nor Tony Leung, who played the central roles in the original, appear in this film as they are replaced by their younger versions portrayed by Chen and Yue respectively. The events of the film take place from 1991 to 1997. It was followed by Infernal Affairs III (2003), which is both a sequel and a semi-prequel to the original film.

== Plot ==
=== In 1991 ===
Hong Kong Police Force Senior Inspector Wong Chi-Shing meets his Triad informant, Hon Sam. Meanwhile, Lau Kin-Ming, who is due to become Hon's prospective mole within the Hong Kong Police Force, assassinates Hon's Triad boss, Ngai Kwun, in a mission for Hon's wife, Mary, who wants Hon to rise up the triad ranks. Mary tells Lau to keep her order secret from all, including Hon.

With Kwun dead, the Big Four triad underbosses intend to stop paying their dues to the Ngai family, but Kwun's successor and son Ngai Wing-Hau manipulates them to continue by blackmailing them on their mutual betrayals. As Lau enlists in the police academy, another police cadet, Chan Wing-Yan, is expelled from the academy upon the discovery that he is also a (illegitimate) son of Kwun's, despite his dissociation with the Ngais. The police tell Chan to meet Wong, who enlists Chan as an undercover cop after Chan relays his purpose of being a righteous man. Chan is imprisoned on fake criminal charges to get close to one of Hon's men, Keung, whom Chan helped arrest previously.

=== In 1995 ===
Lau has risen as a rookie cop, due to tips on criminal dealings from Hon. Meanwhile, Chan has become a small-time gangster after his and Keung's release from prison. Chan's girlfriend aborts their baby due to his gang association. Wing-Hau invites Chan to join the Triad, then tells the Big Four and Hon that he wants to emigrate, leaving them the Hong Kong underworld. Wing-Hau sends Hon to Thailand to link up with Thai cocaine smugglers, and Hon leaves despite Mary's warning of a trap. Mary meets Wong, and finally revealed to the audience that Wong had ordered her to kill Kwun.

Wing-Hau's right-hand-man, Law, who is also an undercover cop, tips off the next deal of Wing-Hau's. There, the police arrest Wing-Hau, but instead of finding drugs, they find a video located by Wing-Hau's hired private investigators, showing Mary and Wong's conspiracy to murder Kwun. Simultaneously, Wing-Hau's men assassinate the Big Four. Mary admits the truth about Kwun's assassination to Hon. Spooked, Hon and Keung kill many of Thai Mafia. Still trapped by the various schemes, Hon makes a desperate overture to Thai mafioso Paul for an alliance, but instead Paul attempts to shoot Hon; fortunately for Hon, the gun misfires. Wing-Hau also sends a man to kill Mary, but Lau kills him to save Mary. The police release Wing-Hau, who kills Law after discovering Law's wire. Chan saves Wing-Hau from a drive-by shooting, possibly conducted by Lau.

Wing-Hau has a car bomb planted in Inspector Wong's car, but it kills Wong's superior and friend, Superintendent Luk, while Wong is unharmed. Lau hides Mary in a safehouse. When she rejects his romantic advances and attempts to travel to Thailand for Hon, Lau anonymously betrays her to Wing-Hau's men, who kill her at Kai Tak Airport.

=== In 1997 ===
Lau is promoted to Probation Inspector, while Chan is a full-fledged triad member. Hon has a new wife and child in Thailand. Inspector Wong admits guilt of conspiracy to murder to an internal investigation, but the department clears him so that he can take down the increasingly powerful Wing-Hau. Wong persuades Hon to return to Hong Kong to testify against Wing-Hau, as revenge for Mary. Wing-Hau is arrested, ruining his attempt to enter politics. Hon's testimony would threaten a short jail sentence for Wing-Hau. Chan later passes Wong decisive evidence against Wing-Hau.

Triad member Uncle John has the Thai mafia take Hon's Thai wife and child hostage. Hon escapes witness protection and confronts Wing-Hau. Hon reveals that the Thai mafia were allied with him, and they killed Uncle John. Hon also proves that Paul is holding the rest of the Ngai family hostage in Hawaii. The police arrive as an infuriated Wing-Hau prepares to shoot Hon. Hon accepts his death internally, knowing that as revenge Wing-Hau will either be killed or jailed for life. Wong ended up shooting Wing-Hau to save Hon. As Wing-Hau dies in Chan's arms, he discovers Chan's wire.

In the aftermath, Wong laments the failure to imprison Wing-Hau. Paul insists on executing the Ngai family to tie up loose ends, despite Hon's reluctance. The murders turn Hon into a top criminal target for Wong. Undercover cop Chan joins Keung in Hon's triad, while Lau, Hon's police spy, handles a case for a young woman, Mary, his future fiancée, setting up the events of Infernal Affairs.

== Cast ==
- Anthony Wong as Wong Chi-shing (黃志誠), a police inspector who aims to take down the Ngai family triad.
- Eric Tsang as Hon Sam (韓琛), a member of Ngai's triad.
- Carina Lau as Mary, Hon Sam's wife.
- Francis Ng as Ngai Wing-hau (倪永孝), the boss of the Ngai family triad after his father's assassination.
- Edison Chen as Lau Kin-ming (劉健明), Hon Sam's mole in the police force.
- Shawn Yue as Chan Wing-yan (陳永仁), Ngai Wing-hau's half-brother and an undercover cop.
- Hu Jun as Luk Kai-cheung (陸啟昌), a police superintendent who is Wong's close friend and partner.
- Chapman To as "Silly" Keung (傻強), Chan's friend and fellow triad member.
- Roy Cheung as Law Kai-yin (羅繼賢), an undercover cop in the triad.
- Liu Kai-chi as Uncle John (三叔), a prominent triad member.
- Joe Cheung as Ngai Kwun (倪坤), the boss of the Ngai family triad and Ngai Wing-hau's father who was assassinated by Lau.
- Henry Fong as Gandhi (甘地), one of the Big Four.
- Peter Ngor as Negro (黑鬼), one of the Big Four.
- Arthur Wong as Kwok-wah (國華), one of the Big Four.
- Teddy Chan as Man-ching (文拯), one of the Big Four.
- Chiu Chung-yu as Mary, the girl Lau meets in the police station at the end of the film.
- Phorjeat Keanpetch as Sunny, the Thai drug lord who tried to kill Hon Sam.
- Ye Shipin as a socialite at the handover party
- Tay Ping Hui as Hung, lawyer for the Ngais
- Hui Kam-fung as the principal of the police cadet school
- Alexander Chan as Ngai Wing-yee (倪永義), Ngai Wing-hau's elder brother.
- Andrew Lin as Ngai Wing-chung (倪永忠), Ngai Wing-hau's younger brother.
- Kara Hui as Ngai Wing-tsz (倪永慈), Ngai Wing-hau's elder sister
- Wan Chi-keung as Superintendent Leung (梁Sir), Wong's superior.
- Chan Charoenwichai as Paul, the Thai drug dealer who became friends with Hon Sam.
- Jonathan Cheung as Big B (大B), a fellow police officer of Lau and Hon Sam's mole
- Kelly Fu as May, Chan's girlfriend

== Music ==
The film's score was composed by Chan Kwong-wing. The theme song, Eternal Realm (長空; Changkong), was performed by Beyond, with Wong Ka-keung handle composition and lyrics written by Wong and Yip Sai-wing.

== Reception ==
The film was highly anticipated prior to its release due to the success achieved by Infernal Affairs. However, the general response to the film was mixed.

== Box office ==
The film grossed HK$24,919,376 — big by 2003 Hong Kong standards, but only about half of the original's earnings.

== Awards ==
Although Infernal Affairs II earned twelve nominations for the 2003 Hong Kong Film Awards, it could not match its predecessor's success. The film won only one award, Best Original Film Song, for the song "長空" (performed by Cantopop band Beyond). The film won the Best Film award at the Hong Kong Film Critics Society Awards.

23rd Hong Kong Film Awards

- Won: Best Original Film Song (Wong Ka Keung, Yip Sai Wing, Beyond)
- Nominated: Best Film (Andrew Lau)
- Nominated: Best Director (Andrew Lau, Mak Siu-fai)
- Nominated: Best Screenplay (Mak Siu-fai, Chong Man-keung)
- Nominated: Best Actor (Francis Ng)
- Nominated: Best Actress (Carina Lau)
- Nominated: Best Supporting Actor (Chapman To)
- Nominated: Best Supporting Actor (Liu Kai-chi)
- Nominated: Best Cinematography (Andrew Lau, Ng Man-ching)
- Nominated: Best Editing (Curran Pang, Danny Pang)
- Nominated: Best Original Film Score (Chan Kwong-wing)
- Nominated: Best Sound Effects (Kinson Tsang)

10th Hong Kong Film Critics Society Awards

- Won: Best Film

== See also ==
- Infernal Affairs
- Infernal Affairs III
- List of films set in Hong Kong
- List of Hong Kong films

Awards and achievements
Preceded by Chinese Odyssey 2002	Hong Kong Film Critics Society Awards for Best Film; 2003	Succeeded by McDull, Prince de la Bun
