= Infernal Affairs =

2002 Hong Kong film by Andrew Lau and Alan Mak

- Theatrical release poster
- Traditional Chinese: 無間道
- Simplified Chinese: 无间道
- Directed by: Andrew Lau; Alan Mak
- Written by: Alan Mak; Felix Chong
- Produced by: Andrew Lau
- Starring: Andy Lau; Tony Leung; Anthony Wong; Eric Tsang
- Cinematography: Andrew Lau; Lai Yiu-fai
- Edited by: Danny Pang; Curran Pang
- Music by: Chan Kwong-wing
- Production companies: Media Asia Films; Basic Pictures
- Distributed by: Media Asia Distribution
- Release date: 12 December 2002
- Running time: 101 minutes
- Country: Hong Kong
- Language: Cantonese
- Budget: HK$20 million
- Box office: HK$55.1 million

Infernal Affairs
- Traditional Chinese: 無間道
- Simplified Chinese: 无间道
- Literal meaning: "Unceasing Path"
Transcriptions
Standard Mandarin
- Hanyu Pinyin: Wú Jiān Dào
Yue: Cantonese
- Jyutping: Mou^{4} Gaan^{3} Dou^{6}

Infernal Affairs (traditional Chinese: 無間道; simplified Chinese: 无间道; lit. 'Unceasing Path') is a 2002 Hong Kong crime drama film directed by Andrew Lau and Alan Mak from a screenplay written by Mak and Felix Chong. The film stars Andy Lau, Tony Leung, Anthony Wong, and Eric Tsang. The film follows an undercover Hong Kong Police Force officer who infiltrates a triad and another police officer who is secretly a spy for the same triad. The film is the first in the Infernal Affairs series, followed by Infernal Affairs II and Infernal Affairs III (both 2003).

At the 22nd Hong Kong Film Awards, Infernal Affairs won seven out of the sixteen awards it was nominated for—including Best Film, Best Director, Best Actor (Leung), and Best Supporting Actor (Wong). It also won in those categories at the 40th Golden Horse Awards and 8th Golden Bauhinia Awards. The film was selected as Hong Kong's entry for the Best Foreign Language Film at the 76th Academy Awards but was not nominated. Miramax Films acquired the United States distribution rights and gave it a limited American theatrical release in 2004.

American director Martin Scorsese remade the film in 2006 as The Departed, which won the Academy Award for Best Picture as well as Academy Award for Best Director, Scorsese's first and only Oscar in his career, and Best Adapted Screenplay. The film has also been remade in India as Homam (2008), in South Korea as City of Damnation (2009), and in Japan as Double Face (2012). In 2018, a television series adaptation aired on TVB.

== Plot ==
Hon Sam, a Hong Kong triad boss, sends Lau Kin-ming, a young gangster, to the police academy to become his mole in the Hong Kong Police Force. Around the same time, cadet Chan Wing-yan is ostensibly expelled from the police academy, but is actually selected to be an undercover cop reporting only to Superintendent Wong Chi-shing, who sends him to infiltrate Hon's triad. Over the next ten years, Chan becomes increasingly burdened by the psychological strain of maintaining his undercover identity. Meanwhile, Lau quickly rises through the ranks, becoming a Senior Inspector.

After successfully infiltrating the triad, Chan informs Wong of a transaction between Hon and some Thai cocaine dealers, which Wong's team interrupts. However, Lau alerts Hon, giving him enough time to get his henchmen to dispose of the evidence. After this incident, Wong and Hon realise they each have a spy within their own organisations, and race each other to uncover the moles. By this time, both Chan and Lau are struggling with their double lives. Chan is afraid he is turning into an actual criminal while also fearing his cover will be blown; he begins undergoing sessions with psychiatrist Lee Sum-yee and jokingly tells her that he is a cop. Meanwhile, Lau appreciates his life as a respected police officer and wants to sever his ties with the triad.

Lau is tasked by Hon to identify the cop who infiltrated the triad; coincidentally, he is also assigned by the HKPF to lead the mission to uncover the triad's mole within their ranks. He uses his new role to have Wong surveilled, hoping to catch him meeting his mole. Wong meets Chan on a rooftop to discuss Hon's next drug shipment as well as Chan's fear of being uncovered. Hon learns about Wong's location from Lau and sends his henchmen to confront them. Chan escapes from the building while Wong tries to distract the gangsters but ends up being thrown off the roof to his death. Just then, the police show up and a shootout ensues. Henchman Keung, unaware that Chan is the mole, chauffeurs him away from the scene but succumbs to a gunshot wound he sustained earlier. When the news reports that Keung was apparently an undercover cop, Hon assumes he was the mole. Using Wong's phone, Lau contacts Chan and convinces him to collaborate in taking Hon down. The police successfully foils Hon's subsequent drug deal and arrests his henchmen. Lau then betrays Hon and kills him.

Everything seems to have fallen into place—Chan can revert to his true identity as a cop while Lau has erased his criminal connections. At police headquarters, Chan and Lau meet for the first time. As Lau prepares to reinstate Chan into the police force, Chan deduces that Lau was the mole and leaves promptly. Realising what had happened, Lau takes possession of Chan's police identity file to use as leverage to dissuade Chan from exposing him. Chan meets with Lee, the only person left whom he can trust, and convinces her that he truly is a cop. Chan then sends a CD to Lau's address containing a recording of Lau's earlier meeting with Hon. Lau's fiancée, Mary, inadvertently listens to the CD and discovers Lau's secret. Chan arranges to meet with Lau on the same rooftop where Wong was killed. There, he disarms Lau and points a pistol to his head. Lau states calmly that he wants to start over as a good person, but Chan rejects his plea to help him conceal his criminal past. Inspector "Big B" arrives and points his gun at Chan, ordering him to release Lau. Chan holds Lau hostage at gunpoint and backs into a lift, but is shot in the head by Big B. Big B then reveals to Lau that he is also a mole planted by Hon, and assures Lau of his loyalty. When they ride the lift down to the ground floor, Lau kills Big B.

Six months later, Lee discovers records of Chan's identity as an undercover cop and he is buried with honours beside Wong. Lau salutes Chan at his funeral. Meanwhile, the internal affairs case is closed after they conclude that Big B was the mole in the police force. A flashback shows the day that Chan was ostensibly expelled from the police academy, with Lau looking back with guilt and wishing he was the one expelled instead.

=== Alternate ending ===
An alternate ending for the film was shot in order to comply with Article 25 (7) of the Chinese Film Administration Regulations specifying that films cannot propagate obscenity, gambling or violence, or abet to commit crimes. In the original Hong Kong ending, Lau concealed his true identity as a triad spy and identified himself as a police officer to avoid punishment. Therefore, the original ending was deemed to promote criminal activity and injustice, and an alternate ending was filmed to make the film suitable for mainland China. In the alternate ending, Inspector Cheung discovers evidence of Lau's criminal activity and immediately arrests him when he gets off the lift. This alternate ending was shown in mainland China and Malaysia.

== Cast ==
- Andy Lau as Senior Inspector Lau Kin-ming (劉健明), Hon's mole in the Hong Kong Police Force. Lau served his triad boss while also valuable in the police force. He later attempted to clear his name and become an upright police officer.
  - Edison Chen as young Lau Kin-ming
- Tony Leung as Chan Wing-yan (陳永仁), an undercover cop in Hon's triad.
  - Shawn Yue as young Chan Wing-yan
- Anthony Wong as Superintendent Wong Chi-shing (黃志誠), Chan Wing-yan's superior. He is one of the few who knows Chan Wing-yan's true identity.
- Eric Tsang as Hon Sam (韓琛), the triad boss. He planted Lau Kin-ming in the police force as his own undercover agent.
- Chapman To as "Silly" Keung (傻強), one of Hon Sam's henchman.
- Gordon Lam as Inspector B (大B; Big B), Lau's subordinate, who is later revealed to be another mole planted by Hon Sam.
- Sammi Cheng as Mary, Lau's fiancée. She didn't know Lau's secret identity at first, but gradually discovered it and was disappointed.
- Kelly Chen as Lee Sum-yee (李心兒), Chan's psychiatrist. She is one of the few people Chan trusts with his real identity.
- Berg Ng as Senior Inspector Cheung (張Sir), Wong's subordinate.
- Wan Chi-keung as Officer Leung (梁Sir), the Chief Superintendent of the Internal Affairs department.
- Dion Lam as Del Piero (迪路), Hon's henchman.
- Elva Hsiao as May, Chan's ex-girlfriend.
- Hui Kam-fung as Officer Yip (葉Sir), Chan's cadet school principal

== Production ==
=== Writing ===
Writer Alan Mak had long wanted to write a story about police and gangsters. The script of Infernal Affairs was inspired by John Woo's Face/Off (1997) but Mak knew that its science fiction elements were too implausible in reality, so he focused on the exchange of identity and psychology between the two leads as its themes. Additionally, Mak wanted to explore the idea of triad members going undercover within the police, which had not been the plot of a movie prior to the release of Infernal Affairs. In the process of Mak's creation, his good friend Felix Chong also encouraged and supported him. The script, written by Mak and revised by Chong, took three years to complete.

The dialogue in the famous rooftop showdown was created on the spot by Felix Chong and Tony Leung, with Chong playing Andy Lau's part. The script originally included a typical shootout in the third act, but Leung insisted on turning it into a dialogue scene.

Gordon Lam did not receive the full script and did not know his character was also a triad mole until the final scene.

=== Investment ===
The script for Infernal Affairs originally belonged to Andy Lau's Teamwork Motion Pictures, but due to the company's entanglement in a lawsuit at the time, it was unable to produce the film. In addition, the creative team lacked investors because other studios viewed a gangster film as no longer novel or profitable. This hesitation reflected broader industry tensions. Professor Gina Marchetti noted that Hong Kong filmmakers like Lau experienced fierce competition from emerging Hollywood, while also battling widespread DVD and VCD piracy. Eventually, Andrew Lau made a hopeless bid and showed the script to John Chong at Media Asia Entertainment Group. To his surprise Chong and company chairman Peter Lam saw potential in the story. Lam proceeded to invest HK $20 million in the film, under the condition that Andy Lau will star the film. In total, the budget for the movie ended up being HK $50 million, with over half going into production costs to amplify the quality of the film. This allowed for the usage of a full orchestra for the score of the film, as opposed to a synthesizer, which marked the first time a full orchestra was used in Hong Kong cinema.

== Themes ==
=== Postcolonial identity crisis in Hong Kong ===
In Infernal Affairs, the identity crisis suffered by both Chan and Lau as moles hint at the struggle of Hong Kong residents, who faced both the colonization by the British and the reunification with Mainland China. Specifically, under Deng Xiaoping's one country, two systems policy, the duplicity, unsettling, and uncertain nature of the future of Hong Kong residents is tightly echoed in Chan and Lau's character developments. Scholar Howard Y. F. Choy further claimed that "this postcolonial (re)turn is actually more a recolonization than a decolonization of the capitalist Cantonese city by the mainland Mandarin master." The 2003 prequel, Infernal Affairs II, features the Hong Kong handover much more directly in the main plot.

Director Andrew Lau himself has asserted that the movie is "quite political", but rather by portraying the handover at all, as well as a society with a corrupt police force and inescapable triad presence, as such depictions "would cause a lot of controversy in China."

Lau has claimed that while growing up in Hong Kong, he was told by his parents that "a good guy cannot be a policeman" and reflected on his identity at the time by adding "As a child and in high school I didn’t like Hong Kong because it was a British colony. The British people controlled the Chinese people. That was my feeling. At that moment, I was thinking, “No matter what, you’re Chinese.”"

Further, when comparing the process of filmmaking in Hong Kong during the "golden age" to filmmaking in mainland China, Lau stated: "you had to face a lot of political things [...], corruption [in the mainland]. But Chinese people now recognize, oh, this is filmmaking and they are quite helpful." Lau also showed willingness to focus primarily on mainland China moving forward, saying "we have to think China first, because China's market is really big. So we must bear in mind that your script can pass the censor of the China Film Association so we can shoot and release in China."

He later went on to direct The Founding of an Army (2017), the third installment in a series portraying the founding myths of the People's Republic of China (the first installment, The Founding of a Republic (2009), had also featured Infernal Affairs star Andy Lau), funded by the Publicity Department of the Chinese Communist Party.

=== Buddhism ===
Infernal Affairs opens with a quotation attributed to the Nirvana Sutra: "The worst of the Eight Hells is called Continuous Hell. It has the meaning of Continuous Suffering. Thus the name." The film also closes with another line: "He who is in Continuous Hell never dies. Longevity is a big hardship in Continuous Hell." While these lines are not found word-for-word in the Mahāparinirvāṇa Sūtra (涅槃經) or other early Chinese Buddhist canonical texts, they could be by the doctrinal concept of Avīci (無間地獄)—a hell of unceasing torment from which there is no escape or rebirth. The original phrasing in Chinese is: 「受身無間者永遠不死，壽長乃無間地獄中之大劫」. Furthermore, the concept of Avīci or Continuous Hell appears in the original title of the film, which can be translated to mean “the deepest hell”.

The film’s title and intertitles reinforce its Buddhist subtext: a journey into moral and spiritual damnation. As film scholar David Bordwell notes, the title alludes to a plunge toward eternal torment for all major characters. While the plot may suggest that good fails and evil triumphs—Chen Wing-yan dies while Lau Kin-ming survives—the Buddhist framing offers an alternative interpretation. Death becomes a form of karmic release for Chen, whose moral perseverance is rewarded with peace. In contrast, Lau continues to live with guilt, deception, and alienation. His survival, when viewed through the lens of Avīci, becomes a punishment rather than a victory.

Thus, Infernal Affairs subverts conventional binaries of justice by offering a Buddhist reading of karmic retribution: the film ends not with legal justice, but with spiritual consequence. Cameron and Cubitt argue that Infernal Affairs presents an amoral urban world as a form of “Continuous Hell,” where repeated cycles of success and failure prevent a clear moral resolution.

=== Hong Kong identity ===
After the 1997 handover of Hong Kong to China, Infernal Affairs has been widely interpreted as exploring the city’s complex identity dynamics. The trilogy portrays characters caught between dual allegiances, reflecting broader postcolonial tensions between British colonial legacies and Chinese national sovereignty. Key figures such as the moles and undercover cops embody conflicting personal, professional, and civic identities, illustrating a persistent struggle to reconcile local and national belonging (Choy, 2007, pp.3; Law, 2006, pp. 118). Scholars emphasize that the films dramatize Hong Kongers’ uncertainty regarding cultural, political, and legal authority, portraying a city in which identities are fluid, performative, and often fractured by historical and socio-political shifts (Li, 2018, pp.332-333; Marchetti, 2007, pp.1-2, 49-50). This narrative mirrors real-world anxieties about maintaining Hong Kong’s unique social and cultural identity under the “one country, two systems” framework, highlighting issues of rootlessness, hybridity, and postcolonial ambivalence.

== Reception ==
=== Box office ===
Upon its premiere in Hong Kong, Infernal Affairs grossed $160,356 during the opening day (16–19 January). However, the release in 2002 coincided with a decline in the Hong Kong film industry, with local film revenues dropping by 24% compared to its previous year. The following year marked the SARS outbreak, with only 77 films released. From 2005 to 2009, annual box office takings from local releases declined to around US$25 million and US$32 million. Scholar Yiu-wai Chu pointed out that during the downturn in Hong Kong cinema, piracy was rampant, and competition from imported Hollywood films was fierce. Against this backdrop, Infernal Affairs became the economic savior of the Hong Kong film industry, revitalizing confidence in Hong Kong's box office and proving that local films could still dominate the Hong kong market. In total, the film grossed $7,035,649 during its run in Hong Kong theatres. The film was then released across Asia, where it grossed a further $169,659 from theatre receipts. In 2016, South Korean theaters re-released the film, which went on to gross $128,026 across three weeks. The total lifetime gross of the film in Korea is $977,903.

In total, worldwide, the film grossed $8,836,958 across release in both domestic markets and European theatres which displayed the film.

=== Critical response ===
On Rotten Tomatoes, Infernal Affairs has an approval rating of 94% based on reviews from 64 critics, with an average rating of 7.50/10. The consensus from the site reads as "Smart and engrossing, this is one of Hong Kong's better cop thrillers." On Metacritic, the film has a score of 75 out of 100 based on reviews from 19 critics, indicating "generally favorable reviews". It was ranked as the 62nd Best Movie of 2004, 86th Most Discussed Movie of 2004, and the 95th Most Shared Movie of 2004.

Film critic Roger Ebert gave the film a three-out-of-four star rating and described Infernal Affairs as offering "rare emotional depth." In his words, "The movie pays off in a kind of emotional complexity rarely seen in crime movies. I cannot reveal what happens but will urge you to consider the thoughts of two men who finally confront their own real identities—in the person of the other character." New York Times reviewer Elvis Mitchell was so enraptured with the film that he stated that "Infernal Affairs is so beautifully shot that the images occasionally distract you from the condensed policier plot."

The film has also attracted comments from the academic community. Scholar Yiu-wai Chu believes that the unique feature of this film is that it reflects the psychological state of Hong Kong people after 1997. Through the identity crisis of two undercover agents, the film expresses the anxiety of people in Hong Kong after its historical transformation. Furthermore, the film breaks away from the formulaic approach of traditional Hong Kong gangster films that focus too much on action scenes, instead shifting its focus to the psychological level.

=== Accolades ===
Infernal Affairs played an integral role in Andrew Lau's breakout films in entering the 21st century. Being the most critically acclaimed film of his to date, it was ranked No. 30 in Empire's "The 100 Best Films of World Cinema" in 2019.

Infernal Affairs gained significant traction during its festival run as it was nominated for sixteen awards during the 22nd Hong Kong Film Awards, winning seven of those categories. It also won the Best Picture at the 40th Golden Horse Awards, the 8th Golden Bauhinia Awards, and the Best Foreign Language Film at the 46th Blue Ribbon Awards.

Eventually, Infernal Affairs would spark the creation of two more films, with Infernal Affairs II getting 11 nominations and Infernal Affairs III getting 7 nominations during the 23rd Hong Kong Film Awards, with Infernal Affairs II winning Best Original Film Song.

List of Accolades
Award / Film Festival	Category	Recipient(s)	Result
Udine Far East Film Festival	Audience Award	Andrew Lau; Alan Mak	Won
Asia Pacific Film Festival	Best Sound	Kinson Tsang	Won
46th Blue Ribbon Awards	Best Foreign Language Film	Andrew Lau; Alan Mak	Won
Belgian Syndicate of Cinema Critics	Grand Prix		Nominated
40th Golden Horse Awards	Best Picture		Won
40th Golden Horse Awards	Best Director	Andrew Lau; Alan Mak	Won
40th Golden Horse Awards	Best Actor	Tony Leung	Won
40th Golden Horse Awards	Best Supporting Actor	Anthony Wong	Won
40th Golden Horse Awards	Best Sound Effects	Kinson Tsang King-Cheung	Won
40th Golden Horse Awards	Viewer's Choice Award		Won
40th Golden Horse Awards	Best Actor	Andy Lau	Nominated
40th Golden Horse Awards	Best Original Screenplay	Alan Mak; Felix Chong	Nominated
40th Golden Horse Awards	Best Film Editing	Danny Pang; Pang Ching-Hei	Nominated
40th Golden Horse Awards	Best Cinematography	Andrew Lau; Lai Yiu-Fai	Nominated
40th Golden Horse Awards	Best Art Direction	Choo Sung Pong; Wong Ching-Ching	Nominated
40th Golden Horse Awards	Best Action Choreography	Dion Lam Dik-On	Nominated
40th Golden Horse Awards	Best Visual Effects	Christopher Doyle	Nominated
8th Golden Bauhinia Awards	Best Picture		Won
8th Golden Bauhinia Awards	Best Director	Andrew Lau; Alan Mak	Won
8th Golden Bauhinia Awards	Best Actor	Tony Leung	Won
8th Golden Bauhinia Awards	Best Actor	Andy Lau	Nominated
8th Golden Bauhinia Awards	Best Supporting Actor	Anthony Wong	Won
8th Golden Bauhinia Awards	Best Original Screenplay	Alan Mak; Felix Chong	Won
9th Hong Kong Film Critics Society Awards	Film of Merit		Won
9th Hong Kong Film Critics Society Awards	Best Actor	Anthony Wong	Won
22nd Hong Kong Film Awards	Best Film		Won
22nd Hong Kong Film Awards	Best Director	Andrew Lau; Alan Mak	Won
22nd Hong Kong Film Awards	Best Screenplay	Alan Mak; Felix Chong	Won
22nd Hong Kong Film Awards	Best Actor	Tony Leung	Won
22nd Hong Kong Film Awards	Best Actor	Andy Lau	Nominated
22nd Hong Kong Film Awards	Best Supporting Actor	Anthony Wong	Won
22nd Hong Kong Film Awards	Best Supporting Actor	Eric Tsang	Nominated
22nd Hong Kong Film Awards	Best Supporting Actor	Chapman To	Nominated
22nd Hong Kong Film Awards	Best Cinematography	Andrew Lau; Lai Yiu-Fai	Nominated
22nd Hong Kong Film Awards	Best Film Editing	Danny Pang; Pang Ching Hei	Won
22nd Hong Kong Film Awards	Best Costume Design	Lee Pik-Kwan	Nominated
22nd Hong Kong Film Awards	Best Action Choreography	Dion Lam	Nominated
22nd Hong Kong Film Awards	Best Original Film Score	Chan Kwong Wing	Nominated
22nd Hong Kong Film Awards	Best Original Film Song	Song: "Infernal Affairs" Composer: Ronald Ng; Lyrics: Albert Leung; Sung by: Tony Leung, Andy Lau	Won
22nd Hong Kong Film Awards	Best Sound Design	Kinson Tsang King-Cheung	Nominated
22nd Hong Kong Film Awards	Best Visual Effects	Christopher Doyle	Nominated

== Legacy ==
=== Sequels and adaptations ===
With star power, visual allure, and an engaging script, Infernal Affairs did very well critically and financially, spawned two sequels and a television series, and attracted the attention of Hollywood. In 2003, Brad Pitt's production company Plan B Entertainment acquired the rights for a Hollywood remake, named The Departed, which was directed by Martin Scorsese, written by William Monahan, starred Leonardo DiCaprio, Matt Damon, Jack Nicholson, Mark Wahlberg, Martin Sheen, Ray Winstone, Vera Farmiga, and Alec Baldwin, set in Boston, Massachusetts, and roughly based on the life of famed Boston mobster James "Whitey" Bulger. The Departed was released on 6 October 2006 by Warner Bros. Pictures and won four Academy Awards, including Best Picture, Best Adapted Screenplay for Monahan, and Best Director for Scorsese. The Departed takes place in Boston, portraying the city as a “Crime City” shaped by the activities of the Irish mob scene. Unlike the moral ambiguity explored in Infernal Affairs, The Departed offers a distinctive resolution of a moral divide. Andrew Lau, the co-director of Infernal Affairs, who was interviewed by Hong Kong newspaper Apple Daily, said: "Of course I think the version I made is better, but the Hollywood version is pretty good too. [Scorsese] made the Hollywood version more attuned to American culture." Andy Lau, one of the main actors in Infernal Affairs, when asked how the movie compares to the original, said: "The Departed was too long and it felt as if Hollywood had combined all three Infernal Affairs movies together." Lau pointed out that the remake featured some of the "golden quotes" of the original but did have much more swearing. He ultimately rated The Departed 8/10 and said that the Hollywood remake is worth a view, though according to Lau's spokeswoman Alice Tam, he felt that the combination of the two female characters into one in The Departed was not as good as the original storyline. Scholars have identified Infernal Affairs as a significant Hong Kong crime film of the early twenty-first century. Its exploration of divided identities, moral ambiguity, and undercover operations contributed to its international appeal and facilitated adaptations across different cultural contexts, most notably Martin Scorsese’s The Departed (Choy, 2007, pp. 52; Li, 2018, pp. 325–326; Marchetti, 2007, pp. 3–4). Academic studies have also linked the film’s success to a broader revival of Hong Kong commercial cinema and the post-handover cultural identity (Law, 2006, pp. 398; Marchetti, 2007, pp. 168).

Media Asia released a limited edition of eight-DVD set of the Infernal Affairs trilogy in an Ultimate Collectible Boxset (無間道終極珍藏DVD系列(8DVD套裝)) on 20 December 2004. Features included an online game and two Chinese novelisations of the film series by Lee Muk-Tung (李牧童), titled 無間道I+II小說 and 無間道III終極無間小說.

In 2009, a Korean remake City of Damnation, which was directed by Kim Dong-won was released on 22 January 2009. In 2009, a Telugu remake Homam, which directed and acted by JD Chakravarthy along with Jagapathi Babu was released and became a notable movie. In 2012, Double Face (ダブルフェイス), a Japanese television remake starring Hidetoshi Nishijima was released by TBS and WOWOW. The production aired in two parts: "Police Impersonation" on WOWOW and "Undercover" on TBS.

A TV series remake debuted in 2018 produced by Media Asia and former TVB producer Tommy Leung. The series, which is titled Infernal Affairs like the film, stars Gallen Lo, Damian Lau, Paul Chun, Lo Hoi-pang, Eric Tsang, Derek Kok, Dominic Lam, Toby Leung and Yuen Biao. The story takes place years after the films' events, with some minor characters reprising their roles alongside a new cast. The TV series uses the same concept as the film, but with an entirely new story and characters, and the setting expanded beyond Hong Kong to include Thailand and Shenzhen. It stretched through three seasons with each season consisting of 12 episodes.

Hindi remake is going to be a joint development between Warner Bros. India and Mumbai – based banner Azure and is set for a remake for a two-picture deal

=== In popular culture ===
Lau, Tsang, and Jacky Cheung parodied the cinema scene to promote the Hong Kong Film Awards. Lau and Tsang, in their respective characters, go through the scene where they meet to gather info on the undercover cop amongst Hon Sam's gang. Lau Kin-ming asks Hon, "Why do we always meet in a cinema?", to which Hon answers, "It's quiet. No one comes to movies". Cheung comes out from the shadows behind them and says, "I don't know...quite a few people watch movies" and we see a slew of Hong Kong celebrities watching various clips of Hong Kong films on the screen. Originally Tony Leung was going to appear but scheduling conflicts led to the recasting.

The 2003 TVB spoof celebrating the Chinese New Year called Mo Ba To (吐氣羊眉賀新春之無霸道), the 2004 comedy film Love Is a Many Stupid Thing by Wong Jing, and the 2004 TVB television drama Shades of Truth were re-writings based on the plot of the film.

In Taiwan SHODA (劉裕銘) and a secondary school student Blanka (布蘭卡) cut and rearranged the original film and inserted new sound tracks to produce their videos Infernal Affairs CD pro2 and Infernal Affairs iPod on the web. The videos had many views and both producers removed their videos after receiving cease and desist letters from the Group Power Workshop Limited (群體工作室), the Taiwan distributor of the film.

The hi-fi shop scene was later recreated with additions of excerpts of the film to encourage businesses to join the Quality Tourism Services Scheme in Hong Kong.

The success of the film inspired many genres, including an open-world video game from United Front Games titled Sleeping Dogs (or True Crime: Hong Kong before being canceled by Activision Blizzard in 2011), with the protagonist of the story infiltrating the criminal underworld as an undercover cop.

== Remaster ==
A 4K remaster of the Infernal Affairs trilogy was released on 12 December 2022, to celebrate the 20th anniversary of Infernal Affairs.

== Music and soundtrack ==
The original film score for Infernal Affairs was written and performed by Chan Kwong-wing.

Track listing
No.	Title	Artist(s)	Length
1.	"Entering The Inferno"	Chan Kwong-wing	2:06
2.	"If I Were Him"	Chan Kwong-wing	1:36
3.	"Goodbye Master"	Chan Kwong-wing	2:18
4.	"Who Are You?"	Chan Kwong-wing	2:44
5.	"Let Me Quit"	Chan Kwong-wing	1:32
6.	"I Dreamt About You"	Chan Kwong-wing	1:23
7.	"Salute"	Chan Kwong-wing	1:56
8.	"Mission Abort"	Chan Kwong-wing	4:31
9.	"I Am A Cop!"	Chan Kwong-wing	3:26
10.	"You Are The Only One"	Chan Kwong-wing	1:06
11.	"I Want To Be A Good Guy"	Chan Kwong-wing	3:30
12.	"Goodbye Master, Goodbye"	Chan Kwong-wing	1:56
13.	"The Inferno"	Chan Kwong-wing	1:51

The theme song, Infernal Affairs (無間道), was composed by Ronald Ng, lyrics provided by Albert Leung, and performed in Cantonese and Mandarin by Andy Lau and Tony Leung.

Although not included in the soundtrack album, Tsai Chin's song "Forgotten Times" (被遺忘的時光) features prominently in this film as a recurring element of its storyline, and also in its sequels.

== See also ==
- Infernal Affairs film series
- Cinema of Hong Kong
- List of Hong Kong films
- Andy Lau filmography
- List of films featuring surveillance
- List of films set in Hong Kong
