= Yee Chung-man =

Hong Kong production designer, costume designer and film director

- Born: November 24, 1951 (age 74); Hong Kong
- Occupations: Production designer; costume designer; film director
- Musical career
- Also known as: Kenneth Yee

Yee Chung-man (奚仲文; born 24 November 1951) is a Hong Kong production designer, art director, costume designer and film director. He was awarded Best Costume and Make Up Design for Curse of the Golden Flower at the 26th Hong Kong Film Awards in 2007.

== Filmography as director ==
- Ocean Heaven (2010)
- And I Hate You So (2000)
- Anna Magdalena (1998)

== Awards and nominations ==
- 2006 - Nomination: Academy Award for Best Costume Design for Curse of the Golden Flower
- 2007 - Awarded: Best Costume and Make Up Design for Curse of the Golden Flower
