= Chapman To =

Hong Kong-Taiwanese actor (born 1972)

- 杜汶澤
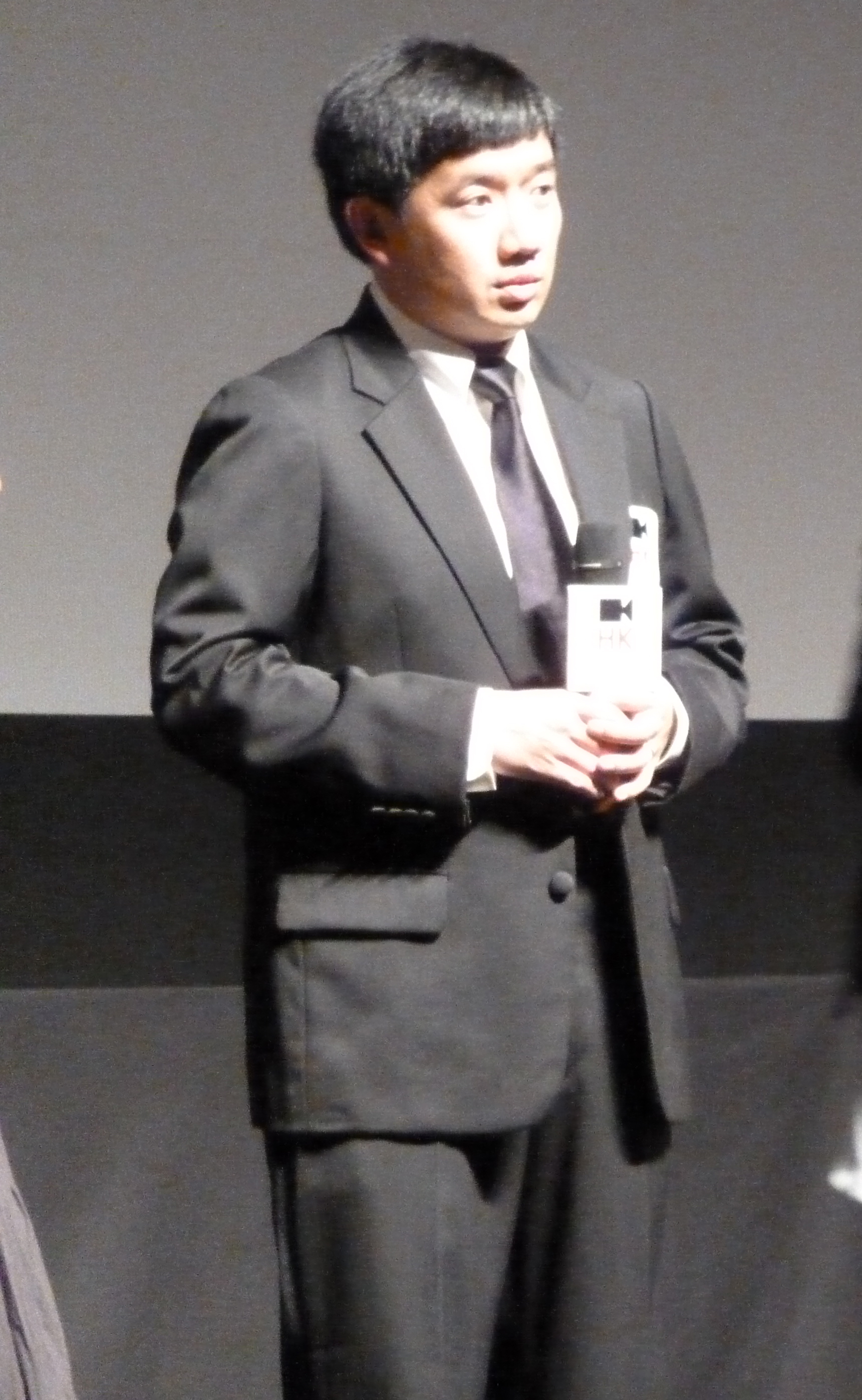
- To at the 2010 Hong Kong International Film Festival
- Born: Edward Ng Cheuk-cheung; 8 June 1972 (age 54); Yau Ma Tei, Kowloon, Hong Kong
- Citizenship: Taiwan
- Years active: 1995–present
- Height: 1.65 m (5 ft 5 in)
- Spouse: Kristal Tin (m. 2005)
- Awards: ATV Awards; 1999 Best Supporting Actor (My Date with a Vampire)

Chinese name
- Traditional Chinese: 杜汶澤
- Simplified Chinese: 杜汶泽
Transcriptions
Standard Mandarin
- Hanyu Pinyin: Dù Wénzé
Yue: Cantonese
- Jyutping: Dou6 Man4-zaak6

Chapman To (Chinese: 杜汶澤, born 8 June 1972), born Edward Ng Cheuk-cheung (Chinese: 吳卓彰), is a Hong Kong-Taiwanese actor. He is best known for his roles in films such as Infernal Affairs and Initial D. He is also the founder of his own multimedia platform known as "Chapman To's Late Show". In 2022, To officially naturalised as a Taiwanese citizen.

== Early life and career ==
To was born at Kwong Wah Hospital in Yau Ma Tei. His father worked in a fruit shop in Yau Ma Tei. To studied at Diocesan Preparatory School and Diocesan Boys' School. His stage name was adapted from the horse "Chapman River" (澤汶渡) due to his previous hobby of horse betting. He began his acting career in TV soap operas and moved to the big screen in 2000. He is best known for playing Tsui Wai-Keung in the Infernal Affairs trilogy, as well as the role of Itsuki Tachibana in Initial D. He married Kristal Tin in 2005. In 2006, he starred in Pang Ho-Cheung's film Isabella with Isabella Leong.

Along with acting, To was also a radio personality for Commercial Radio 2(CR2). He hosted the show, On a Clear Day (在晴朗的一天出發), a 2-hour morning show co-hosted by Michelle Lo and Jan Lamb. However, after a fall-out with the key personnel of the radio company, Chapman lost the radio hosting job in 2006.

To is also an avid amateur photographer. In 2011, To was hired as the photographer for cantopop singer Prudence Liew's album Love Addict. To stated that this was the first time he was paid for his photography work.

On 3 August 2018, he founded a multimedia platform called "Chapman To's Late Show" (杜汶澤喱騷). The channel mainly made fun of current issues in Hong Kong. It also made tutorials for smores and interviewed famous politicians and actors/singers from Hong Kong. Due to the platform's content being daring, down-to-earth and its satirical way of presenting current issues, it was widely praised by Hong Kong's netizens. In 2020, To announced that the platform would be pulling out of YouTube and Facebook, and subsequently established a paid platform at lateshow.net, with the subscription fee being HK$60 per month and VIP subscription HK$600 per year; VIP members get access to special content such as his stand-up comedy live performance of 2020. Celebrities such as Anthony Wong and Gregory Wong have appeared in its shows.

== Political positions and Chinese blacklist ==
In March 2014, To expressed support for the Sunflower Student Movement in Taiwan, which was skeptical of a proposed agreement to create closer ties between Taiwan and mainland China.

During Hong Kong's Umbrella Movement, he was involved in online arguments with some mainland netizens.

To criticised the Chinese government and proudly stated to netizens to "Stop me from coming to the mainland if you've got guts." Chinese audiences reacted and To's first two movies after the incident, Let Go for Love and Aberdeen, flopped at the Chinese box office. The production companies apologised and regretted casting To.

Hong Kong directors such as Wong Jing subsequently refused to work with To, resulting in him being blacklisted in both the Chinese and Hong Kong movie market.

Exiled from the Chinese market, To focused on Malaysia and Singapore. Despite zero Chinese investment, his films have achieved success in their target markets. To acted as director, writer, and actor for these low-budget films.

To moved to Taiwan in November 2020, and announced in February 2022 that he had attained Taiwanese citizenship.

== Filmography ==
=== Television ===
Year	Title	Role
1995	Fist of Fury	Jing Wu Men's student
1996	The Good Old Days	
1998	My Date with a Vampire	Kam Ching-chung
2000	Showbiz Tycoon	Sing Lung
2000	My Date with a Vampire II	Kam Ching-chung
2004	Kung Fu Soccer	Lok
2010	OL Supreme	Sze Sap Yat
2010	Who's the Hero	
2025	Zero Day	Brother Qiang

=== Film ===
Year	Title	Role	Notes
1999	House of the Damned		
2000	Violent Cop	David Liu	
2000	The Teacher Without Chalk		
2001	Jiang hu: The Triad Zone		
2001	Let's Sing Along	Long Hair	
2001	Goodbye, Mr. Cool		
2001	Never Say Goodbye		
2001	The Cheaters	Chi-Wai	
2001	Esprit D'Amour		
2001	Prison on Fire - Life Sentence		
2002	Golden Chicken	Club Owner	
2002	Infernal Affairs	Tsui Wai-keung	Nominated - Hong Kong Film Award for Best Supporting Actor
2002	The Mummy, Aged 19		
2002	Just One Look	Villager No. 3	
2002	The Wall		
2002	Mighty Baby	Kassey	
2002	The Irresistible Piggies		
2002	Feel 100%		
2002	Partners	Lee Tin-wah	
2002	Dry Wood Fierce Fire	Autumn Sze-to	
2002	Nine Girls and a Ghost	Basketball Coach	
2002	Return from the Other World	Fai	
2002	Black Mask 2: City of Masks	King (Cantonese voice)	
2003	The Twins Effect	Ken	
2003	Golden Chicken 2	Club Owner	
2003	Master Q: Incredible Pet Detective	Old Master Q (voice)	
2003	Infernal Affairs II	Tsui Wai-keung	Nominated - Hong Kong Film Award for Best Supporting Actor
2003	The Spy Dad	Love Kwan	
2003	Infernal Affairs III	Tsui Wai-keung	
2003	Men Suddenly in Black	Chao	Nominated - Golden Horse Award for Best Supporting Actor
2003	Black White Forest	Toast	
2003	Looking for Mr. Perfect		
2003	Diva: Ah Hey	Huffman	
2003	Cat and Mouse	Han Zhang	
2003	My Lucky Star	Yip's stepmother boyfriend	
2003	Honesty	Failure Fai	
2004	The Attractive One	Butt	
2004	Escape from Hong Kong Island	Policeman	
2004	Six Strong Guys	Chai	
2004	Super Model		
2004	Jiang Hu	Brother To	
2004	Love Is a M Stupid Thing	Yan	
2004	Enter the Phoenix	Kin	
2004	The Beautiful Country	Chingmy	
2004	A World Without Thieves	Sha Gen (Cantonese voice)	

- Moonlight in Tokyo (2005) – Hoi
  - Nominated - Golden Horse Award for Best Supporting Actor
- Wait 'Til You're Older (2005) – Policeman
- Initial D (2005) – Itsuki Tachibana
- Colour of the Loyalty (2005)
- Confession of Pain (2006) – Inspector Tsui Wing Kwong
- A Melody Looking (2006) – Chapman
- Isabella (2006) – Shing
  - Nominated - Berlin International Film Festival Best Supporting Actor Award
- Trivial Matters (2007)
- Simply Actors (2007) – Crazy Sam
- Lady Cop & Papa Crook (2008)
- True Women for Sale (2008)
- Parking (2008)
- Home Run (2008)
- Rebellion (2009) – Blackie
- Ex (2010) Entered into the 2010 Hong Kong International Film Festival
- Once a Gangster (2010) (writer)
- Triple Tap (2010)
- La Comédie humaine (2010) Entered into the 2010 Hong Kong International Film Festival
- The Jade and the Pearl (2010) – Eunuch Yeung
- Legend of the Fist: The Return of Chen Zhen (2010) – Inspector Huang Haolong (voice)
- Who's the Hero (2010) (TV series)
- The Kidnap (2010)
- All's Well, Ends Well 2011 (2011)
- Mr. and Mrs. Incredible (2011)
- Eternal Moment (2011)
- Men Suddenly in Love (2011)
- Hi, Fidelity (2011)
- Love in Space (2011)
- A Simple Life (2011)
- The Sorcerer and the White Snake (2011)
- A Big Deal (2011)
- Turning Point 2 (2011)
- All's Well, Ends Well 2012 (2012)
- Mr. and Mrs. Gambler (2012)
- Marry a Perfect Man (2012)
- Love Lifting (2012)
- The Bounty (2012)
- Vulgaria (2012)
  - Nominated - Hong Kong Film Award for Best Actor
  - Nominated - Golden Horse Award for Best Actor
- Diva (2012)
  - Hong Kong Film Critics Society Award for Best Actor
  - Nominated - Hong Kong Film Award for Best Supporting Actor
  - Nominated - Golden Horse Award for Best Supporting Actor
- Bring Happiness Home (2013)
- Hotel Deluxe (2013)
- The Wedding Diary 2 (2013)
- SDU: Sex Duties Unit (2013)
- The Midas Touch (2013)
- Mr. and Mrs. Player (2013)
- Hello Babies (2014)
- Golden Chicken 3 (2014)
- From Vegas to Macau (2014)
- Black Comedy (2014)
- Naked Ambition 2 (2014)
- Let Go for Love (2014)
- Aberdeen (2014)
- Flirting in the Air (2014)
- King of Mahjong (2015)
- Sara (2015) (as producer only)
- Impossible (2015)
- The Mobfathers (2015)
- Let's Eat! (2016)
- The Empty Hands (2017)
- G Affairs (2019)
