= Chan Kwong-wing =

Hong Kong music composer

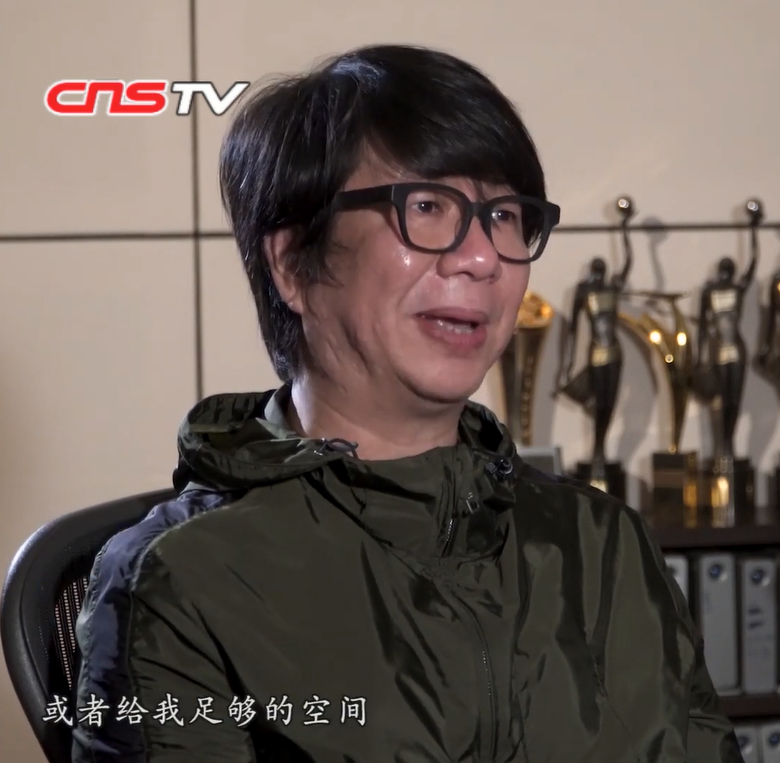
- Chan in an interview for the film The Captain in 2019
- Born: 15 June 1967 (age 59); Hong Kong
- Occupation: Music composer
- Awards: Hong Kong Film Awards – Best Original Film Score; 1999 The Storm Riders; 2010 Bodyguards and Assassins; 2012 Wu Xia

Chinese name
- Traditional Chinese: 陳光榮
- Simplified Chinese: 陈光荣
Transcriptions
Standard Mandarin
- Hanyu Pinyin: Chén Guāngróng
Yue: Cantonese
- Jyutping: can4 gwong1 wing4
- Musical career
- Also known as: Punk仔
- Origin: Hong Kong

Punk Chan Kwong-wing (simplified Chinese: 陈光荣; traditional Chinese: 陳光榮; born June 15, 1967), also known as Comfort Chan Kwong-wing, is a music composer for Hong Kong films. Some of his well-known works in films include the Infernal Affairs trilogy, SPL: Sha Po Lang, Initial D, Daisy, Legend of the Fist: The Return of Chen Zhen, The Last Tycoon, Kung Fu Monster, The Captain, Cook Up a Storm and Chinese Doctors.

Chan has been nominated seventeen times at the Hong Kong Film Awards and has won three awards for scoring The Storm Riders, Bodyguards and Assassins and Wu Xia.

Chan also works as a record producer for Hong Kong singers including Fiona Fung, Pakho Chau and Ekin Cheng.

== Awards and nominations ==
Hong Kong Film Awards

- Won: Best Original Film Score The Storm Riders
- Nominated: Best Original Film Song The Storm Riders
- Nominated: Best Original Film Score A Man Called Hero
- Nominated: Best Original Film Song A Man Called Hero
- Nominated: Best Original Film ScoreInfernal Affairs
- Nominated: Best Original Film Score Infernal Affairs II
- Nominated: Best Original Film Score Infernal Affairs III
- Nominated: Best Original Film Score Initial D
- Nominated: Best Original Film Score Confession of Pain
- Nominated: Best Original Film Score The Warlords
- Won: Best Original Film Score Bodyguards and Assassins
- Nominated: Best Original Film Song Bodyguards and Assassins
- Nominated: Best Original Film Score A Beautiful Life
- Nominated: Best Original Film Score Overheard 2
- Won: Best Original Film Score Wu Xia
- Nominated: Best Original Film Score The Silent War
- Nominated: Best Original Film Score The Last Tycoon

Fajr International Film Festival

- Won: Best Music Crystal Simorgh The Kingdom of Solomon

Golden Rooster Awards

- Won: Best Original Score Chinese Doctors (with Kay Chan)
