= The Proud Twins =

The Proud Twins may refer to:

- Juedai Shuangjiao, a Wuxia novel by Gu Long
- The Proud Twins (film), a 1979 Hong Kong film
- The Proud Twins (TV series), a 2005 Hong Kong TV series
