= Police Cadet '84 =

- Poster
- Also known as: 新紮師兄
- 新紮師兄
- Genre: Police Drama, Action
- Written by: Wai Ka Fai 韋家輝; Gary Tang 鄧特希
- Starring: Tony Leung 梁朝偉; Maggie Cheung 張曼玉; Carina Lau 劉嘉玲; Sean Lau 劉青雲; David Lui 呂方; Andy Tai 戴志偉; Eddie Kwan關禮傑; Helena Law 羅蘭; Lau Siu Ming 劉兆銘; Benz Hui 許紹雄; Soh Hang-Suen 蘇杏璇; Ng Man-Tat 吳孟達
- Opening theme: Set Sail with Me 伴我啟航 by The Little Tigers 小虎隊
- Ending theme: You Make Me Happy Too 你令我快樂過 by David Lui 呂方
- Country of origin: Hong Kong
- Original language: Cantonese
- No. of episodes: 40

Production
- Producer: Chiu Chun Keung 招振強
- Production location: Hong Kong
- Camera setup: 45 minutes
- Production company: Television Broadcasts Limited

Original release
- Network: TVB Jade
- Release: 29 October – 21 December 1984

Related
- Police Cadet '85; Police Cadet '88

Police Cadet '84 (Chinese: 新紮師兄; Jyutping: San1 zaat3 Si1 Hing1) is a 1984 TVB police drama TV series which starred then up and coming stars such as Tony Leung, Maggie Cheung, Carina Lau, and Sean Lau. The story centers on young police cadets' struggles and life at the Police Cadet Academy (based on the Royal Hong Kong Police Cadet School). Tragedy, romance, conflicts, and intrigues were featured. The series was followed by two sequels, Police Cadet '85 and Police Cadet '88.

== Synopsis ==
Cheung Wai Kit joins the Police Cadet Academy school after graduating high school. At the Police Cadet Academy he meets four good friends that he goes through thick and thin with. He joins the Hong Kong police force after graduating from cadet school. His older half-brother Cheung Ga Ming also joins the Hong Kong police force after graduating from university. Due to the stress and hecticness of work, he begins to neglect his girlfriend Tse Wing Chi; she then finds comfort in his good friend and former cadet schoolmate Kiu Chi Ho. Whom will she choose in the end?

== Cast ==
=== Main cast ===
- Tony Leung 梁朝偉 as Cheung Wai Kit 張偉杰

The main protagonist of the series. His parents separated when he was very young. His father left his mother for a night club hostess. His mother struggles to make a living by sewing doll clothes at home. His father lies to him about being poor when he and his new family live in a luxury apartment building and his half-brother is provided college tuition for one of Hong Kong's best universities. He decides to enter the Police Cadet Academy since he could not afford to go to university and also hopes that he could become a police officer in order to provide a steady income so his mother can live a better life. Later develops a romantic relationship with his next-door neighbor Tse Wing Chi.

- Maggie Cheung 張曼玉 as Tse Wing Chi 謝穎之

Cheung Wai Kit's next-door neighbor. They grew up together. She is the typical ugly ducking who became a swan. Growing up she had self=esteem issues due to being made fun of for her mousy plain looks, thick glasses and her mom and younger sister verbally abusing her. Cheung Wai Kit starts to notice her in a different way once she gets a complete makeover and starts working at Kiu Chi Ho company. She gets caught in a love triangle between Cheung Wai Kit and Kiu Chi Ho.

- Carina Lau 劉嘉玲 as Cheung Ka Man 張嘉汶

Cheung Wai Kit's half sister. They meet for the first time after Wai Kit goes to his father's home looking for his new wife, since she had a quarrel with his mother at a beauty salon. She is intrigued by her father's other family and is the only one seeking a friendly relationship with her half-brother and his mother. She meets Wai Kit's friends Fit Lo and Ko Lo Chun by tagging along with him to a camping trip. Ko Lo Chun develops a crush on her but it's Fit Lo who she falls in love with and later marries.

- Sean Lau 劉青雲 as Fit Lo Ngai Fung Fit佬 倪峰

His name is Ngai Fung but everyone calls him Fit Lo because of his athleticism. He is the star pupil at the Police Cadet Academy. None of the other cadets like him in the beginning but they learn to respect him later on. He lives with his grandmother. He later falls in love with Ka Man. Her mother and brother are against the relationship due to his financially insecure background and his job as a police officer. While investigating a case he gets run over by a criminal. He becomes crippled in one leg and goes into a coma. While recovering in the hospital, Ka Man's mother sees how much her daughter loves Fit Lo and gives her blessing to the couple. On his wedding day, Ka Man's brother shows his disapproval of him marrying his sister by injuring his other leg. He leaves Hong Kong and comes back as a rich businessman later. After his return to Hong Kong, he marries Ka Man.

=== Supporting cast ===
- David Lui 呂方 as Ko Lo Chun 高佬泉

Wai Kit's classmate at the Police Cadet Academy. His name is pronounced the same as "tall man Chun" in Cantonese which is the total opposite of his physical structure since he is short in stature. He does not graduate from the academy due to not being able to pass the physical test. Has a crush on Cheung Ka Man.

- Eddie Kwan 關禮傑 as Kiu Chi Ho 喬志豪

Wai Kit's classmate at the Police Cadet Academy. He comes from a well-to-do family. His uncle sends him to the academy hoping he can build up his courage and self esteem. He develops a relationship with Wing Chi when she works for his company.

- Lau Siu Ming 劉兆銘 as Wai Kit's father

He is Wai Kit, Ka Man, Ga Ming's father. He left his wife for a night club hostess even though he and Wei Kit's mother has been separated for many years they are still legally married. He lies to Wei Kit and his mother that he is poor when his new family lives in a luxury apartment and his son Ga Ming is able to attend university.

- Soh Hang-Suen 蘇杏璇 as Wai Kit's mother

Wei Kit's mother. She is a loving mother who tries her best to provide for her son. She knows the real situation with her husband and his new family but does not tell her son about it. She makes a living sewing doll clothes from her home.

- Helena Law 羅蘭 as Lee Lai Mei 李麗媚

Ka Man and Ga Ming's mother. She was a former night club hostess who forced Wei Kit's father to leave his family when she got pregnant with Ga Ming. She is not mean in nature but feels insecure that she will always be the other women.

- Andy Tai 戴志偉 as Cheung Ga Ming 張家明

Wei Kit's half brother and Ka Man's brother. He knows the true situation of his family and hates it that his mother is a former night club hostess and home wrecker. Is very protective of his younger sister Ka Man. He mentally cracks when he finds out who his real father is.

- Lau Dan 劉丹 as Chi Ho's uncle

Kiu Chi Ho's uncle. He sends his nephew to the Police Cadet academy hoping he can become brave and build up his self esteem.

- Ng Man-Tat 吳孟達 as Yip Cheung Wa 葉昌華

Wai Kit's instructor at the Academy. He is hard on his students but is really a caring figure.

- Benz Hui 許紹雄 as Hui Siu Dung 許兆冬

Wai Kit's maternal uncle from his mother side. He is given a nickname "all talk and no do" because he only talks but doesn't do much.

== Sequels and related film ==
The series was followed by two sequels. The first, titled "Police Cadet '85" focuses on the former cadets from the original series who are now sworn police officers and also trainers at the police academy. Tony Leung reprises his character but the rest of the main cast only appear in cameo roles. The series stars new cast members Margie Tsang, Chow Yun Fat, Jaime Chik, and Simon Yam. It was released in October 1985.

The second and final sequel, "Police Cadet '88" focuses on the characters' rise through the ranks as CID officers dealing with criminal activities. Tony Leung once again reprises his character. Margie Tsang also reprises her role for the first half of the series. The rest of the main cast includes Sheren Tang, Eddy Ko, Dominic Lam, Carrie Ng, and Chingmy Yau. It aired from November 1987 to January 1988.

A 2004 Hong Kong film called "Moving Targets" (Chinese title "2004新紮師兄") starring Nicolas Tse, Edison Chen, Simon Yam, and Gillian Chung is based on this drama series.
