= Moving Targets (film) =

2004 Hong Kong film by Wong Jing

- Moving Targets theatrical poster

Chinese name
- Traditional Chinese: 2004新紮師兄
- Simplified Chinese: 2004新扎师兄
Transcriptions
Standard Mandarin
- Hanyu Pinyin: Èr Líng Líng Sì Xīn Zhā Shī Xiōng
Yue: Cantonese
- Jyutping: Ji6 Ling4 Ling4 Sei3 San1 Zaak6 Si1 Hing1
- Directed by: Wong Jing
- Written by: Wong Jing
- Based on: Police Cadet '84
- Produced by: Wong Jing; Bowie Lam; Alvin Lam; Wong Ka Hee
- Starring: Nicholas Tse; Edison Chen; Simon Yam; Gillian Chung; Lam Suet; Michelle Yim; Roy Chow; Kent Tong
- Cinematography: Ng Man-Ching
- Edited by: Azrael Chung Wai-Chiu
- Music by: Marco Wan Ho-Kit
- Production companies: Film Power Company Limited; Jing's Production
- Distributed by: Universe Entertainment Ltd. Beijing Poly-bona Film Distribution Co., Ltd.
- Release date: 16 April 2004
- Running time: 94 minutes
- Country: Hong Kong
- Language: Cantonese
- Box office: $4,224,175 HKD

Moving Targets (Chinese: 2004新紮師兄; Jyutping: ye ling ling say sun jat si hing) is a 2004 Hong Kong action crime film starring Nicholas Tse, Edison Chen, Simon Yam, and Gillian Chung as the main leads. With Michelle Yim, Roy Chow, Lam Suet, and Kent Tong in the main supporting roles. Directed, written, and produced by Wong Jing, the film is based on the popular 1980 TVB drama series Police Cadet '84.

Moving Targets was released in Mainland China under the title Young Detective (Chinese: 青年干探) and grossed an estimated ¥3,000,000 RMB at the box office. It was distributed there by Beijing Poly-bona Film Distribution Co., Ltd.

== Plot ==
Cheung Wai-kit (Nicholas Tse) and Ngai Fung "Fit Lo" (Edison Chen) are best friends and two of Hong Kong's top young cops. After foiling a robbery attempt they are promoted to the Narcotic units led by hot-headed police chief Cheung Tit-Man (Simon Yam). Tit-Man is actually Kit's dad, who left him and his mother (Michelle Mai) after shooting her years ago. Kit sees Tit-Man as an enemy and is not so thrilled with having to work under him.

Kit requests a transfer to the internal affairs department, but decides to participate in one last operation where the team tries to take down a major drug lord known as Big Bryan (Ken Tong). During the arrest attempt, Fit Lo is seen letting Bryan go, which costs him his job. Now seemingly on opposite sides of the law, Kit and Fit Lo must try to keep their friendship together. To make things even more complicated Fit Lo is also married to Kit's former love interest and cousin Wing Chi (Gillian Chung).

== Cast ==
- Nicholas Tse as Cheung Wai-kit
- Edison Chen as Ngai Fung "Fit Lo"
- Simon Yam as Cheung Tit-Man
- Gillian Chung as Wing Chi
- Lam Suet as Fat Seven
- Michelle Yim as Kit's Mother
- Roy Chow as Ko Lo Chun
- Kent Tong as Big Bryan
- Wu An as Ho Jia
- Shu Qao as Officer Nichole Sun
- David Lee Wai-Seung as Officer Wai Kwok-Ying
- Wan Chi Keung as Lai Sir
- Samuel Leung Cheuk-Moon as Ronaldo
- Roderick Lam Chung-Kei as Little Bryan

== Reception ==
"Moving Targets" was a box office flop in Hong Kong. Even with an noticeable cast involve the movie garnered a lot of negative reviews due to the weak storyline and re-writing of popular characters from the 80's TVB drama series Police Cadet '84 which the movie is based on. Audiences did not like the darker storyline and merging of characters together when compared to the TVB series. Gillian Chung character Wing Chi was a hybrid of Tse Wing Chi and Cheung Ka Man (played by Maggie Cheung and Carina Lau) in the TVB series. Same for Simon Yam character which was a hybrid of characters that were Kit's older half brother and father in the TVB series (played by Andy Dai and Lau Siu Ming).
