= Two Most Honorable Knights =

1988 Hong Kong wuxia TV series

- Promotional poster
- Also known as: Chut Tai Sheung Kiu
- 絕代雙驕
- Genre: Wuxia
- Based on: Juedai Shuangjiao by Gu Long
- Starring: Tony Leung; Hugo Ng
- Opening theme: "Wish You Know My Heart" (願你知我心) by Tony Leung
- Ending theme: "Threads of Emotions Tug at My Heart" (情絲牽我心) by Tony Leung
- Country of origin: Hong Kong
- Original language: Cantonese
- No. of episodes: 20

Production
- Production location: Hong Kong
- Running time: 42 minutes per episode

Original release
- Network: TVB
- Release: 1988

Two Most Honorable Knights (絕代雙驕) is a Hong Kong wuxia television series adapted from Gu Long's novel Juedai Shuangjiao. The series was first aired on TVB in Hong Kong in 1988.

== Cast ==
- Tony Leung as Xiaoyuer
- Hugo Ng as Hua Wuque
- Kitty Lai as Tie Xinlan
- Shallin Tse as Su Ying
- Maggie Chan as Yaoyue
- Michael Miu as Jiang Feng
- Elliot Ngok as Yan Nantian
- Eddie Kwan as Jiang Yulang
- Yeung Chak-lam as Jiang Biehe
- Jamie Chik as Hua Yuenu
- Sandra Ng as Third Lady
- Eugina Lau as Zhang Jing
- Wong Wan-choi as Wei Wuya
- Law Lan as Hua Popo
