= Police Cadet '85 =

- Poster
- Also known as: 新紮師兄續集
- 新紮師兄續集
- Genre: Police Drama, Action
- Written by: Wai Ka-fai 韋家輝; Gary Tang 鄧特希
- Starring: Tony Leung 梁朝偉; Chow Yun-fat 周潤發; Carina Lau 劉嘉玲; Margie Tsang 曾華倩; Simon Yam 任達華; Jaime Chik 戚美珍; David Lui 呂 方 Helena Law 羅蘭; Lau Siu Ming 劉兆銘; Benz Hui 許紹雄; Soh Hang-suen 蘇杏璇; Richard Ng 吳孟達; Sun Ming Guang 孫明光; Nathan Chan 陳庭威
- Opening theme: Adhere To The Hearts Of The Ideal 堅持心中理想 by Tony Leung 梁朝偉
- Ending theme: Loneliness Is Not Afraid 孤獨不怕在 by Tony Leung 梁朝偉 & David Lui 呂 方
- Country of origin: Hong Kong
- Original language: Cantonese
- No. of episodes: 40

Production
- Producer: Chiu Chun Keung 招振強
- Production location: Hong Kong
- Camera setup: 45 minutes
- Production company: Television Broadcasts Limited

Original release
- Network: TVB Jade
- Release: 28 October – 20 December 1985

Related
- Police Cadet '84; Police Cadet '88

Police Cadet '85 (Chinese: 新紮師兄續集; Jyutping: San1 Zaat3 Si1 Hing1 Zuk6 Zaap6) is a 1985 TVB police drama TV series starring Tony Leung as male lead and Margie Tsang as female lead with Carina Lau, Chow Yun-fat, Jaime Chik, and Simon Yam in supporting roles. This is the 1st sequel and 2nd series in the Police Cadet trilogy.

Maggie Cheung, Sean Lau, Eddie Kwan, Lau Dan and Andy Tai characters from the 1st series "Police Cadet '84" are only briefly shown or mentioned. Richard Ng's character who played a minor role in the 1st series plays a more significant role in the 2nd series.

== Synopsis ==
The continuing story of Cheung Wai Kit rise through the ranks of the Hong Kong Police department. Cheung Wai Kit is now a two pip inspector rank in charge of the CID unit. His mom no longer has to sew doll clothes from home and they live in a command officer only apartment. He finally has a friendly relationship with his father and step mother. The only thing missing in his life is love, his ex-girlfriend Tse Wing Chi has emigrated to Canada and doesn't plan on coming back to Hong Kong. Besides trying to find love again, he also has to deal with family issues as new relatives arrives in Hong Kong from China and corrupted cops who want to take him down.

== Cast ==
=== Main cast ===
- Tony Leung 梁朝偉 as Cheung Wai Kit 張偉杰

Wai Kit is now a CID agent with an Inspector rank. He and his mom are now living comfortably in a nice apartment. He is finally on friendly terms with his father and step mother. He becomes friends with his former mentor Yip sir's daughter Yip How Yee after accidentally knocking her down while chasing a crook. He faces a lot of challenges while rising in the ranks such as corrupted cop Hon Bun and dealing with his uncle Cheung Ging Sing who becomes a money counterfeiter. His mother is constantly worried about him risking his life every day for his job. Tse Wing Chi has since left Hong Kong for Canada but he finds love again in How Yee and they eventually get married, but their marriage constantly runs into problems caused by her friend who is obsessed with him.

- Margie Tsang 曾華倩 as Yip How Yee 葉巧宜

Yip Cheung Wa's youngest daughter. She is constantly neglected by her parent especially her mother because they blame her for the accidental death of her brother when they were kids. She meets Wai Kit by accident when he was chasing a robber and later develops a crush on him. She joins the Police Cadet Academy to get away from her family. At the Police Cadet Academy Wai Kit is also her instructor, he singles her out because she is Yip Sir's daughter. After graduating from the Academy she becomes a police officer, the department pairs her up with a very senior (in age) police officer. Thinking that her relationship with Wai Kit is of unrequited love she begins to ignore and avoid him, it was during this period that Wai Kit realized that he loves her too but was to afraid to pursue her due to his lingering past relationship with Wing Chi.

- Chow Yun-fat 周潤發 as Cheung Ging Sing 張竟成

Wai Kit's uncle from his father side. He and his mother just arrived from China, because Wai Kit's father does not want to help them he takes on menial jobs to support him and his mother. He was a doctor in China and tries to become one in Hong Kong by going to school part-time. He develops a relationship with Yip How Lan and they get engaged to be married but his future mother in law does not like him because of his financial background and also because Hon Bun is after How Lan as a conquest, which leads to them eventually breaking up.

- Jaime Chik 戚美珍 as Yip How Lan 葉巧楠

Yip Sir's oldest daughter and How Yee's older sister. She is a screen writer for a television series. Her mother pushes her to marry financially well because she does not want her to suffer like she did. She develops a relationship with Ging Sing and they are engaged to be married but is broken up by her mother and Hon Bun. She becomes one of Hon Bun's conquest and later marries him. She later finds out he is a womanizer and never really loved her.

- Simon Yam 任達華 as Hon Bun 韩彬

A senior inspector and corrupted cop who is assigned to the same precinct as Wai Kit. He is also a serial womanizer and wants to bed every women he fancies. He frames Cheung Ging Sing as a money counterfeiter in order to ruin his relationship with Yip How Lan. His early life was as a garment factory worker, he marries a seamstress at the factory and uses her to put him through University and then leaves her when he graduates.

=== Supporting cast ===
- Carina Lau 劉嘉玲 as Cheung Ka Man 張嘉汶

She is now a single mother to a young son. Fit Lo was found guilty and is now serving a life sentence in jail for all the crimes he had committed in the 1st series. Before being arrested he had brought her a supermarket to keep her financially secured. She later starts a relationship with ICAC agent Cheng Wing Hong.

- David Lui 呂方 as Ko Lo Chun 高佬泉

He still carries a torch for Ka Man and works at her supermarket to stay close to her. With her and Fit Lo's marriage over he hopes that he can finally have a chance with her, but it's unrequited love as she falls for someone else once again.

- Helena Law 羅蘭 as Lee Lai Mei 李麗媚

Wai Kit's step mother and Ka Man's mother. With the death of her son Ga Ming at the end of the 1st series she has finally comes to terms in accepting Wai Kit in her life. She now has a friendly relationship with her husband's ex wife and even treats Wai Kit as her own son.

- Lau Siu Ming 劉兆銘 as Wai Kit's father

He is Wai Kit and Ka Man father. He is once again up to his stingy ways as he neglects his younger brother and mother who just arrived to Hong Kong from China, because of his non support for them the minute they arrive his younger brother Ging Sing is forced to do menial jobs to support their mother while attending school part-time to become a doctor in Hong Kong.

- Benz Hui 許紹雄 as Hui Siu Dung 許兆冬

Wai Kit's uncle from his mother side. He is now a single father to his two step sons. His wife from the 1st series who was a police women was killed when held hostage during a robbery.

- Soh Hang-suen 蘇杏璇 as Wai Kit's mother

Wei Kit's mother. She is constantly worried about her son because of his job. She ask him to become a Police Cadet Academy instructor in order to feel more at ease.

- Richard Ng 吳孟達 as Yip Cheung Wa 葉昌華

Wai Kit's instructor at the Academy in the 1st series. How Yee and How Lan's father. He is in an unhappy marriage, his wife always blames him for being poor and wants all their daughter to marry rich in order not to end up in a marriage like hers. He still maintains a teacher student relationship with Wai Kit and is ecstatic when Wai Kit marries How Yee and becomes his son in law.

- Sun Ming Guang 孫明光 as Cheng Wing Hong 鄭永康

ICAC agent that Ka Man falls in love with after her divorce from Fit Lo. He finds out he has cancer and tries to push her away but she waits for him to come back to Hong Kong after his treatment. They get engaged to be married but he is killed by Poon Dak Ming while investigating him and Hon Bun.

- Nathan Chan 陳庭威 as Poon Dak Ming 潘德明

Yip How Yee's High School classmate who has a major crush on her and doesn't know how to take no for an answer. He follows How Yee to the Police Cadet Academy in order to get close to her and tries to frame Wai Kit for misconduct at the Academy once he finds out How Yee likes Wai Kit and not him. He becomes a police officer after graduating but gets entangled with Hon Bun. Hon Bun eventually kills him when he tries to blackmail him.

=== Cameos ===
- Sean Lau 劉青雲 as Fit Lo Ngai Fung Fit佬 倪峰
- Eddie Kwan 關禮傑 as Kiu Chi Ho 喬志豪
- Shek Kin 石堅 as How Yee's beat walking partner
