= Juedai Shuangjiao =

1966 wuxia novel by Gu Long

- Author: Gu Long
- Original title: 絕代雙驕
- Language: Chinese
- Genre: Wuxia, romance, adventure
- Publisher: Wuxia and History
- Publication date: February 1966 – March 1969
- Publication place: Hong Kong
- Media type: Print
- ISBN: 7549623198

Juedai Shuangjiao
- Traditional Chinese: 絕代雙驕
- Simplified Chinese: 绝代双骄
- Literal meaning: The Peerless Proud Twins
Transcriptions
Standard Mandarin
- Hanyu Pinyin: Jué Dài Shuāng Jiāo

Juedai Shuangjiao (絕代雙驕), literally The Peerless Proud Twins, is a wuxia novel by Gu Long. It was first published as a serial in the Hong Kong magazine Wuxia and History (武俠與歷史) from February 1966 to March 1969. The novel is about a pair of twin brothers who, because of a feud between two formidable martial artists, were separated at birth and raised on opposing sides. As of 2020, it has been adapted into four films and eight television series.

== Plot summary ==
Eighteen years ago, a handsome martial artist, Jiang Feng, was injured in a fight and coincidentally saved by the sisters Yaoyue and Lianxing of Yihua Palace, one of the deadliest martial arts clans in the jianghu. Yaoyue fell in love with Jiang Feng, but he rejected her despite her beauty because her arrogance put him off. He fell in love with the sisters' servant, Hua Yuenu, impregnated her and fled with her. Jiang Feng's jealous servant, Jiang Biehe, betrayed his master and caused a group of bandits to attack Jiang Feng and Hua Yuenu shortly after Hua had just given birth to a pair of twin boys.

Although Jiang Feng and Hua Yuenu died, their sons were unharmed and discovered by Yaoyue and Lianxing. Yaoyue refuses to forgive Jiang Feng for scorning her and vows to take revenge by making his sons destroy each other. The sisters then adopt one of the boys, whom they name Hua Wuque. The other boy, known as Xiaoyuer, is initially saved by his father's sworn brother, Yan Nantian, a powerful swordsman, but later falls into the hands of the Ten Great Villains, a group of notorious criminals in the jianghu. However, the Villains did not harm Xiaoyuer and instead decide to raise him and train him to become a great villain.

Hua Wuque grows up to be a good-mannered, refined gentleman well-trained in the elegant martial arts of Yihua Palace. On the other hand, Xiaoyuer is trained by the Ten Great Villains in a wide range of not-so-powerful martial arts and other skills such as theft, deception, the use of poison, and the art of disguise. Once he is old enough, the streetwise Xiaoyuer ventures out into the jianghu alone and relies on his wits and skills on a series of adventures. During this time, he gets embroiled in complicated romantic relationships with various women, including Tie Xinlan, Su Ying, and Zhang Jing.

In the meantime, Yaoyue sends Hua Wuque to kill Xiaoyuer, lying to him that Xiaoyuer poses a dangerous threat to them. Against the backdrop of various escapades, the twins come to blows several times. Each of their encounters follows the same pattern. Hua Wuque is more powerful in martial arts than Xiaoyuer, but the latter always manages to survive by using his wits to escape from the former. The twins are initially hostile towards each other and have wildly different personalities; Hua Wuque is righteous, intelligent but naïve, while Xiaoyuer is expedient, streetwise and cunning. However, they gradually develop mutual respect and become friends after braving danger together. At the same time, they become entangled in a love triangle with Tie Xinlan.

Determined to make the twins kill each other, Yaoyue eventually forces Hua Wuque to challenge Xiaoyuer to a duel to the death. After Xiaoyuer is apparently killed by Hua Wuque during the duel, Yaoyue reveals the truth to Hua Wuque and tells him about her plan to make their father pay the ultimate price for scorning her. Hua Wuque is horrified after learning the truth and realising that Xiaoyuer is actually his twin brother. Just then, Xiaoyuer comes back to life, having feigned death earlier. The twins finally recognise and acknowledge each other as brothers, thus putting an end to Yaoyue's evil plan and ending the story on a happy note.

== Principal characters ==
- Xiaoyuer (小魚兒) – Jiang Feng and Hua Yuenu's son who is raised and trained by the Ten Great Villains.
- Hua Wuque (花無缺) – Xiaoyuer's twin brother and the heir to Yihua Palace.
- Tie Xinlan (鐵心蘭) – Tie Zhan's daughter who gets involved in a love triangle with Xiaoyuer and Hua Wuque.
- Su Ying (蘇櫻) – Wei Wuya's foster daughter who falls in love with Xiaoyuer.
- Yan Nantian (燕南天) – a swordsman who was Jiang Feng's sworn brother.
- Lu Zhongyuan (路仲遠) – Yan Nantian's friend and a formidable martial artist.
- Jiang Feng (江楓) and Hua Yuenu (花月奴) – Xiaoyuer and Hua Wuque's parents.
- Yaoyue (邀月) and Lianxing (憐星) – the mistresses of Yihua Palace who adopted and raised Hua Wuque.
- Ten Great Villains (十大惡人) – a group of villainous martial artists who raised and trained Xiaoyuer.
- Jiang Biehe (江別鶴) – Jiang Feng's servant who betrayed his master.

== Adaptations ==
=== Films ===
Year	Title	Production	Main cast
1971	The Jade Faced Assassin	Shaw Brothers Studio (Hong Kong)	Lily Ho, Kao Yuen, Ku Feng, Lin Chia
1979	The Proud Twins	Shaw Brothers Studio (Hong Kong)	Alexander Fu, Ng Wai-kwok, Wong Yung, Wen Hsueh-erh, Susanna Au-yeung, Kitty Meng, Tang Ching
1992	Handsome Siblings	Hong Kong	Andy Lau, Brigitte Lin, Sharla Cheung, Michael Miu, Francis Ng, Anita Yuen
2013	Kung Fu Divas	Philippines	Ai-Ai Delas Alas, Marian Rivera

=== Television ===
Year	Title	Production	Main cast
1977	Juedai Shuangjiao	TTV (Taiwan)	Hsia Ling-ling, Chiang Ming, Chang Lu, He Szu-min, Betty Pei, Yin Pao-lien, Wu Heng
1978	Xiaoyuer: The Spearless Divinity	Channel 3 (Thailand)	Den Dokpradu, Panya Nirunkul
1979	The Twins	TVB (Hong Kong)	Wong Yuen-sun, Shek Sau, Michelle Yim, Wong Hang-sau, Wong Wan-choi, Idy Chan
1986	Xin Juedai Shuangjiao	Taiwan	Sharon Yeung, Huang Hsiang-lien, King Doi-yum, Wong Wai-man, Tien Feng, Chang Fu-mei, Ku Cheng
1988	Two Most Honorable Knights	TVB (Hong Kong)	Tony Leung, Hugo Ng, Kitty Lai, Shallin Tse, Maggie Chan, Michael Miu, Elliot Ngok
1999	The Legendary Siblings	TTV (Taiwan)	Jimmy Lin, Alec Su, Vivien Chen, Theresa Lee, Yu Li, Chang Jui-chu, Lin Jui-yang
2002	The Legendary Siblings 2	CTS (Taiwan)	Jimmy Lin, Sattawat Sethakorn, Li Xiaolu, Lawrence Ng, Yu Li, Elvis Tsui, Zheng Guolin
2005	The Proud Twins	Hong Kong	Dicky Cheung, Nicholas Tse, Fan Bingbing, Yuan Quan, Elvis Tsui, Wu Qingzhe, Kong Lin
2020	Handsome Siblings	Huace Film & TV (China)	Chen Zheyuan, Hu Yitian, Liang Jingxian, Liang Jie, Gallen Lo, Tay Ping Hui, Mao Linlin, Zhou Junchao

=== Comics ===
The Hong Kong manhua series Force of Buddha's Palm (如來神掌) by Wong Yuk-long has a long story arc that reproduces elements of Gu Long's wuxia novels, including Juedai Shuangjiao. The story arc is covered in an English translation of the comic series published by Jademan Comics from 1989 to 1993.

The 1997 Hong Kong manhua series Peerless Two Prides (絕代雙驕) by Ho Chi-man (Chinese: 何志文) is adapted from Juedai Shuangjiao, expanding on events after the novel's ending. It is published in Indonesia under the title The Impeccable Twins.

The 2009 Japanese manga series Marvelous Twins (マーベラス・ツインズ 絶代双驕) published by Kadokawa Shoten Publishing is adapted from Juedai Shuangjiao.

=== Animation ===
In 2022, Tencent released a donghua series adapted from the novel on WeTV in Indonesia, Thailand and mainland China.

=== Video games ===
- 新絕代雙驕 (1999)
- 新絕代雙驕 II (2000)
- 新絕代雙驕 III (2002)
- 新絕代雙驕online (2005)
- 新絕代雙驕前傳 (2006)
