= Bends (film) =

2013 Hong Kong film by Flora Lau

Bends 過界
- Film poster
- Directed by: Flora Lau
- Written by: Flora Lau
- Produced by: Nansun Shi; Winnie Yu Tsang; Melissa Lee; Ken Hui
- Starring: Carina Lau; Chen Kun
- Cinematography: Christopher Doyle
- Edited by: Flora Lau; Alexis Dos Santos; Aq Lee
- Music by: Patrick Jonsson
- Distributed by: Tomson International Entertainment Distribution Limited
- Release dates: 18 May 2013 (Cannes); 21 November 2013 (Hong Kong)
- Running time: 95 minutes
- Country: Hong Kong
- Languages: Cantonese; Mandarin; English

Bends (Chinese: 過界) is a 2013 Hong Kong drama film written and directed by Flora Lau in her directorial debut. It was screened in the Un Certain Regard section at the 2013 Cannes Film Festival.

== Plot ==
Anna, a wealthy Hong Kong housewife, suddenly finds herself deep in financial trouble as her only source of income, her husband, disappears. Her driver, Fai, and his wife who lives in Shenzhen, are expecting the couple's second child. But under China's One Child Policy, they must find the money to pay the penalty or a way for Fai's wife to give birth in Hong Kong.

== Cast ==
- Carina Lau as Anna
- Chen Kun as Fai
- Tian Yuan as Tingting
- Lawrence Cheng as Leo
- Stephanie Che
- Elena Kong
- Tony Ho

== Critical reception ==
Maggie Lee of Variety wrote, "Flora Lau's debut is beautifully assembled by a top-pedigree production crew, but it remains a modest accomplishment in scope and impact."

Andrea Lo of HK Magazine gave the film 4 stars out of 5. She wrote, "The film is topical and emotionally fraught for all of us in Hong Kong, posing questions of wealth and status between our city and the mainland: questions that are on all our minds."

== Awards ==
Chen Kun won the Best Actor Award at the 2013 International du Film de Femmes de Sale in Morocco. Carina Lau won the Best Actress Award at the 2014 Osaka Asian Film Festival.
