= Soh Hang-suen =

- Born: 8 October 1951; Crown Colony of Hong Kong
- Died: 12 June 2013 (aged 61); Hong Kong
- Occupation: Actress
- Years active: 1974–2002
- Awards: Hong Kong Film Awards – Best Supporting Actress; 2012 Life Without Principle

Chinese name
- Traditional Chinese: 蘇杏璇
- Simplified Chinese: 苏杏璇
Transcriptions
Yue: Cantonese
- Jyutping: soh3 hang4 suen1
- Musical career
- Also known as: So Hang-shuen; So Hung-shuen; Soh Hang-shuen; Soh Hung-shuen; So Hang-suen
- Origin: Hong Kong

Soh Hang-suen (8 October 1951 – 12 June 2013), (alternatively romanised as So Hung-shuen), was a Hong Kong actress. Soh worked for TVB during its Golden Age, joining in 1974, and was most notable for her role in Looking Back in Anger. Soh ran her own vegetarian restaurant in Tsim Sha Tsui. She died on 12 June 2013, after complications arising from a stroke.

== Filmography ==
Film
Year	English title	Chinese title	Role	Notes
1974	Hong Kong 73	香港73	Tien Gi's Wife	
1974	Fun, Hong Kong Style	太平山下		
1974	Gossip Street	多咀街	Sissy So	
1974	Sorrow of the Gentry	朱門怨	Fong Mei	
1974	From the Underground	勾魂艷鬼		
1974	My Darling Love	啼笑夫妻		
1974	Everyday is Sunday	天天報喜		
1976	Love Cross-Road	她的爸的媽媽的		
1977	On Probation	出籠		
1977	The Discharged	出冊	Hui Chan	
1978	Big Leap Forward	大躍進		
1979	The Stowaways	偷渡來客		
1980	One Step Ahead	兵來賊擋	Nun	
1980	A Gambler's Story	邪鬥串	Mrs Kwok	
1981	Man on the Brink	邊緣人		
1981	To Sir with Troubles	交叉零蛋		
1982	Teenage Dreamers	檸檬可樂	Ms Zeng	
1982	Brothers from Walled City	城寨出來者	Mei Ling's mother	
1982	Energetic 21	衝激21	Mann's aunt	
1983	Superstar	天皇巨星		
1983	First Time	第一次	Foong's mother	
1983	Oh, My Cops!	摩登衙門	Aunt Kau	
1984	Law with Two Phases	公僕	Police Madam	
1984	Destiny's Champion	拳擊小子	Nurse	
1985	Chase a Fortune	吉人天相	Sunflower's mahjong friend	
1985	Puppy Love	鬥氣小神仙	Ching's mom	
1985	Heart of Dragon	龍的心	Cafe Owner's wife	
1986	The Millionaires' Express	富貴列車	Fong Tin's mom	
1986	Sweet Sixteen	甜蜜十六歲	Principal	
1987	Happy Bigamist	一屋兩妻	woman caning Hsin	
1987	That Enchanting Night	良青花奔月	Siu Fen's doctor mom	
1987	The Romancing Star	精裝追女仔	Tung Tung's mother	
1987	Flaming Brothers	江湖龍虎門	Nun	
1989	Perfect Match	最佳男朋友	Mrs Lam	
1989	The Wild Ones	我未成年	Jane's mom	
1989	Crocodile Hunter	專釣大鱷	Happy Chiu's mother	
1990	Bullet in the Head	喋血街頭	Jane’s Mother	
1992	Once a Black Sheep	草莽英雌	Sister Maria	
1994	From Zero to Hero	亂世超人		
1995	Happy Hour	歡樂時光	Connie	
2002	Inner Senses	異度空間	Siu-yu's mother	
2011	Life Without Principle	奪命金	Cheng Siu-kun	Hong Kong Film Award for Best Supporting Actress

Television
Year	English title	Chinese title	Role	Notes
1976	Hotel	狂潮		
1978	The Giants	強人		
1979	The Twins	絕代雙驕	Yiu-yuet	
1979	The Passenger	抉擇		
1979	The Good, the Bad and the Ugly	網中人		
1980	Yesterday's Glitter	京華春夢		
1980	Five Easy Pieces	輪流傳		
1983	The Legend of the Condor Heroes	射鵰英雄傳	Li Ping	
1984	The Clones	再版人	Nurse Chen	
1984	The Smiling, Proud Wanderer	笑傲江湖		
1984	The Duke of Mount Deer	鹿鼎記	To Hung-ying	
1984	Police Cadet '84	新紮師兄		
1985	Police Cadet '85	新紮師兄續集		
1985	Take Care, Your Highness!	皇上保重		
1987	Police Cadet 1988	新紮師兄1988		
1989	Looking Back in Anger	義不容情	Aunt Wan	
1991	Drifters	怒海孤鴻		
1991	One Step Beyond	老友鬼鬼		
1992	File of Justice	壹號皇庭	Lora Kong Lee Chung-wan	
1993	File of Justice II	壹號皇庭II	Lora Kong Lee Chung-wan	
1993	The Buddhism Palm Strikes Back	如來神掌再戰江湖	Abbess Kau-kuet	
1993	Top Cop	超能幹探SuperCop		
1994	File of Justice III	壹號皇庭III	Lora Kong Lee Chung-wan	
1995	Detective Investigation Files	刑事偵緝檔案		
1995	The Criminal Investigator	O記實錄	Ho Mei-ying	
1995	File of Justice IV	壹號皇庭IV	Lora Kong Lee Chung-wan	
1995	Detective Investigation Files II	刑事偵緝檔案II		
2000	Showbiz Tycoon	影城大亨		
2000	A Dream Named Desire	美麗傳說		
2010	The Men of Justice	法網群英	Laura Kong Lee Chung-wan	
