= The Twins (1979 TV series) =

1979 Hong Kong wuxia TV series

- VCD cover art
- Also known as: Legendary Siblings
- 絕代雙驕
- Genre: Wuxia
- Based on: Juedai Shuangjiao by Gu Long
- Screenplay by: Wu Sa
- Directed by: Yau Ka-hung; Chiu Chun-keung; Ng Yun-cheun
- Starring: Wong Yuen-sun; Shek Sau; Wong Hang-sau; Wong Wan-choi; Idy Chan; Michelle Yim
- Theme music composer: Joseph Koo
- Opening theme: "The Peerless Proud Twins" (絕代雙驕) by Roman Tam
- Country of origin: Hong Kong
- Original language: Cantonese
- No. of episodes: 17

Production
- Producer: Chiu Chun-keung
- Production location: Hong Kong
- Running time: ≈ 45 minutes per episode

Original release
- Network: TVB
- Release: 6 May 1979

The Twins (絕代雙驕) is a Hong Kong wuxia television series adapted from Gu Long's novel Juedai Shuangjiao. The series was first aired on TVB in Hong Kong on 6 May 1979.

== Cast ==
- Wong Yuen-sun as Xiaoyuer
- Shek Sau as Hua Wuque
- Michelle Yim as Su Ying
- Wong Hang-sau as Tie Xinlan
- Ko Miu-see as Zhang Jing
- Paul Chu as Jiang Feng
- Lui Yau-wai as Hua Yuenu
- So Hang-suen as Yaoyue
- Wan Lau-mei as Lianxing
- Stanley Fung as Jiang Biehe
- Lee Kwok-lun as Jiang Yulang
- Wong Wan-choi as Heizhizhu
- Cheung Chung as Yan Nantian
- Idy Chan as Murong Jiu
- Cheng Lai-fong as Tie Pinggu
- Cheung Mou-hau as Yin Jiuyou
- Ye Fung as Hahaer
- Chan Yee-hing as Tu Jiaojiao
- Wong Sun as Li Dazui
- Lau Nga-lai as Xiaomimi
- Cheng Ho-wai as the Queen
- Wong Mun-wai as Duan Yunfei
- Ma Hing-sang as Du Sha
- Lo Dai-wai as Bai Kaixin
- Lai Wing-keung as Ouyang Ding
- Liu Wai-hung as Ouyang Dang
- Lo Hoi-pang as Xuanyuan Sanguang
- Chung Chi-keung as Tie Zhan
- Yuen Siu-fai as Wan Chunlou
- Chan Kwok-kuen as Lu Zhongyuan
- Pang Cheuk-lam as Wei Wuya
- Giu Hung as Huangniu
- Tsui Kwong-lam as Baishanjun
- Kon Kwok-wai as Hu Yaoshi
- Lee Tim-shing as Longgezai / Bai Yang
- Wong Pak-man as Bishe Shenjun
- Sheung-koon Yuk as Ma Yiyun
- Yuen Tak as Jinyuanxing
- Tsang Chor-lam as Sichenke
- Cheng Kwan-min as Goushu
- Chan Ling-wai as Heimianjun
