= Juedai Shuangjiao (TV series) =

1977 Taiwanese wuxia TV series

- 絕代雙驕
- Genre: Wuxia
- Based on: Juedai Shuangjiao by Gu Long
- Starring: Hsia Ling-ling; Chiang Ming
- Country of origin: Taiwan
- Original language: Mandarin
- No. of episodes: 60

Production
- Production location: Taiwan
- Running time: ≈ 45 minutes per episode

Original release
- Network: TTV
- Release: 1977

Juedai Shuangjiao (絕代雙驕) is a Taiwanese television series adapted from Gu Long's novel of the same title. The series was first aired on TTV in Taiwan in 1977.

== Cast ==
- Hsia Ling-ling as Xiaoyuer / Hua Yuenu
- Chiang Ming as Hua Wuque / Jiang Feng
- Chang Lu as Tie Xinlan
- He Szu-min as Su Ying / Murong Jiu
- Betty Pei as Yaoyue
- Yin Pao-lien as Lianxing
- Wu Heng as Yan Nantian
- Chao Tzu-ching / Chu Hui-chen as Tie Pinggu
- Ke Lei as Zhang Jing
- Tsao Chian as Jiang Biehe
- Ching Hung as Jiang Yulang
- Lei Ming as Yin Ping
- Chin Shih as Du Sha
- Shen Hsueh-chen as Tu Jiaojiao
- Tsui Fu-sheng as Li Dazui

== Production ==
The series was a major production by TTV because it involved most of the artistes in TTV at the time. Hsia Ling-ling was initially selected by Gu Long for the role of Tie Xinlan, but she ended up portraying Xiaoyuer instead. Gu Long praised Hsia's performance as "a classic of the classics". Su Ying and Murong Jiu, originally two different characters in the novel, were combined into a single role (portrayed by He Szu-min) in the series.

News of Gu Long having an affair with Chao Tzu-ching surfaced when the series was being aired in 1977. Chao was heavily criticised in the media for being a "third party" as Gu Long was already married. Gu Long had previously requested the screenwriters to give Chao a bigger role on screen. After the scandal was exposed, Chao was fired from the project and replaced by Chu Hui-chen. The screenwriters also changed the script to make Chao's character, Tie Pinggu, become disfigured.
