= The Smiling, Proud Wanderer (1984 TV series) =

1984 Hong Kong TV series

- VCD box art
- Also known as: State of Divinity
- 笑傲江湖
- Genre: Wuxia
- Based on: The Smiling, Proud Wanderer by Jin Yong
- Screenplay by: Cheung Ngai-sing; Kwan Chin-pok; Wong Ka-wai; Leung Chi-ming; Ng Ho
- Directed by: Clarence Fok; Lau Tin-fu; Yu Hoi-wing; Tam Long-cheung
- Starring: Chow Yun-fat; Rebecca Chan
- Opening theme: "Laughing Proudly in the Jianghu" (笑傲江湖) by Johnny Yip and Frances Yip
- Country of origin: Hong Kong
- Original language: Cantonese
- No. of episodes: 30

Production
- Producer: Lee Ding-lun
- Production location: Hong Kong
- Running time: ≈40 minutes per episode
- Production company: TVB

Original release
- Network: TVB Jade
- Release: 2 April – 11 May 1984

The Smiling, Proud Wanderer (笑傲江湖) is a Hong Kong wuxia television series adapted from the novel of the same title by Jin Yong. Starring Chow Yun-fat and Rebecca Chan, the series was first broadcast on TVB Jade in Hong Kong from 2 April to 11 May 1984.

== Cast ==
- Chow Yun-fat as Linghu Chong
- Rebecca Chan as Ren Yingying
- Jaime Chik as Yue Lingshan
- Kenneth Tsang as Yue Buqun
- Stephen Tung as Lin Pingzhi
- Yan Pak as Ning Zhongze
- Kong Ngai as Dongfang Bubai
- Lau Siu-ming as Ren Woxing
- Lau Kong as Feng Qingyang
- Lau Dan as Tian Boguang
- Isabella Wong as Yilin
- Yeung Chak-lam as Zuo Lengchan
- Chan Fuk-sang as Lan Fenghuang
- Kwan Hoi-san as Lin Zhennan
- Nam Hong as Lin Zhennan's wife
- Simon Yam as Liu Zhengfeng
- Ma Chung-tak as Xiang Wentian
- Felix Lok as Yu Canghai
- Shih Kien as Wang Yuanba
- Bonnie Wong as Dingyi
- Soh Hang-suen as Dingxian
- Pui Wan as Dingjing
- Bak Man-biu as Fangzheng
- Yu Tze-ming as Chongxu
- Chun Wong as Mu Gaofeng
- Cheng Siu-ping as Mute Granny
- Tam Chuen-hing as Yang Lianting
- Kam Kwok-wai as Qu Yang
- Law Kwok-wai as Ping Yizhi
- Yip Tin-hang as Bujie
- Chu Siu-bo as Qu Feiyan
- Lau Kwok-shing as Lüzhuweng
- Ng Yip-kwong as Tianmen
- Ma Hing-sang as Tiansong
- Ko Hung as Mo Da
- Ng Man-tat as Huangzhonggong
- Lam Man-wai as Heibaizi
- Mak Ho-wai as Tubiweng
- Tsui Kwong-lam as Danqingsheng
- Bobby Tsang as Lu Dayou
- Andy Doi as Lao Denuo
- Chu Kong as Laotouzi
- Wai Yee-yin as Laobusi
- Kwok Fung as Zu Qianqiu
- Lo Kwok-wai as Ji Wushi
- Eddie Kwan as Xiang Danian
- Sean Lau as Mi Weiyi
- Bobby Au-yeung as Yu Renyan
- Lawrence Ng as Liu Zhengfeng's son
- Kiki Sheung as Liu Zhengfeng's daughter
- Albert Law as Lin Yuantu
- Kwan Ching as Yue Su
- Wong Yat-fei as Cai Zifeng
- Chu Tit-wo as Shangguan Yun
- Lam Tin as Tong Baixiong
- Lee Shu-ka as Lu Bo
- Wong Tsung-chi as Wang Jiajun
- Lam Chun-hin as Wang Jiaju
- Ho Pik-kin as Adviser Yi
- Eddie Kwan, Sean Lau and Michael Tao as Mount Hua Sect members
- Ho Kwong-lun, Long Tin-sang, Chan Kwok-kuen, Chan Dik-hak, Chun Hung and Cheng Fan-sang as the Six Immortals of the Peach Valley
