= Take Care, Your Highness! =

1985 Hong Kong historical drama television series

- VCD cover
- 皇上保重
- Genre: Historical drama
- Written by: Chan Lai-wah; Chan Yuk-ping; Ng Yuk-cheung; Sit Ka-wah
- Directed by: Jonathan Chik; Po Tang-chun; Leung Sung-fan; Ng Yat-fan
- Starring: Andy Lau; Carina Lau; Sean Lau; Lau Siu-ming; Paul Chun; Ha Yu
- Theme music composer: Michael Lai
- Opening theme: Dragon's Heart (龍的心) by Johnny Yip
- Ending theme: Love in the Breeze (情在風中) by Johnny Yip and Mok Yim Yee
- Composer: Michael Lai
- Country of origin: Hong Kong
- Original language: Cantonese
- No. of episodes: 20

Production
- Producer: Yau Ka-hung
- Production location: Hong Kong
- Camera setup: Multi camera
- Production company: TVB

Original release
- Network: TVB Jade
- Release: 30 September – 25 October 1985

Take Care, Your Highness!
- Traditional Chinese: 皇上保重
- Simplified Chinese: 皇上保重
- Literal meaning: "Emperor, Take Care"
Transcriptions
Standard Mandarin
- Hanyu Pinyin: Huáng Shàng Bǎo Zhòng
Yue: Cantonese
- Jyutping: Wong4 Seong6 Bou2 Zung6

Take Care, Your Highness! is a 1985 Hong Kong historical drama television series produced by TVB and starring Andy Lau in the title role of Kin-lung Emperor, the sixth emperor of the Qing Dynasty. The series focuses on the power struggle in the Imperial Qing Palace, telling the story of righteous folks while also presenting a hesitant love story.

== Plot ==
Prince Po (Andy Lau) possesses extraordinary talent but has an uninhibited nature, which worries his father Yung-ching Emperor (Lau Siu-ming) as he cannot decide whether Po can inherit his throne and promote the Manchu Foundation. In order to pave the way for Po as his successor, Yung-ching breaks up Po's romance with Suen Fuk-yu (Carina Lau), an ethnic Han Chinese, and declares her a Princess, which makes her become Po's younger adoptive-sister. Yung-ching also declares the daughter of Lee Wing-po, the most powerful man of the Eight Banners, as Crown Princess. Although Yung-ching have broke them up, Po and Fuk-yu still date secretly.

Not long after, Yung-ching was assassinated and Prince Po inherits his throne, becoming the Kin-lung Emperor. Because Kin-lung did not understand statecraft, plus the chaotic rebellion of the Miao people, he releases his uncle, the 14th Prince Wan-tai (Paul Chun), who once failed the fight for the throne against Yung-ching. Wan-tai regains his position and helps Kin-lung with government affairs and made it very well organized. However, Wan-tai's ambition comes up again, and desires to seize the throne. Wan-tai then spread rumors everywhere citing Kin-lung has left Beijing to trace his origin. Wan-tai awaits his opportunity to seize the throne. Kin-lung travels to the south in disguise as a civilian and there, he becomes acquainted with Chow Yat-ching (Ha Yu), Tan-ka Mui and Chiu Nam-sing (Sean Lau), whom are members of the Anti-Qing society "Chung Yee Tong". After a thorough investigation, Kin-lung was able to prove that he is indeed a Manchu and knows that Wan-tai is up to no good. After Kin-lung's identity was exposed, the members of "Chung Yee Tong" turned against him and Kin-lung can must reverse the situation to resolve the crisis both inside and outside of the palace.

== Cast ==
Note: Some of the characters' names are in Cantonese romanisation.

- Andy Lau as Kin-lung Emperor / Prince Po (乾隆帝/寶親王)
- Danny Poon as 6th Prince (六皇子)
- Chan Chung-lin
- Joseph Lee as Fu-hang (傅恒)
- Lau Siu-ming as Yung-ching Emperor (雍正帝)
- Yeung Chak-lam as Fu Hung-po (傅紅保)
- Felix Lok as Ngok-yee-tai (鄂爾泰)
- Law Kwok-wai
- Teresa Ha as Empress Hao-sing-hin / Consort Hei (孝聖憲皇后/熹妃)
- Leung Kit-fong
- Suen Kwai-hing
- Cho Chai
- Law Lan as Granny (嬷嬷)
- Pui Man
- Cheung Man-kwong
- Ho Lai-nam
- Ng Pok-kwan
- Lam Man-wai
- Lam Choi-lin
- Carina Lau as Suen Fuk-yu (孫福如)
- Chan On-ying as Kam Lin (金蓮)
- Shally Tsang as Empress Xiaoxianchun
- Yu Tin-wai
- Fok Kit-ching
- Mak Ho-wai
- Luk Ying-hong
- Ha Yu as Chow Yat-ching (周日清)
- Paul Chun as Prince Wan-tai (允禵)
- Lai Pik-kwong
- Lau Kwok-sing
- Sean Lau as Chiu Nam-sing (趙南星)
- Fok Ka-lai
- Chan Siu-wah
- Kwok Fung
- Ho Kwong-lun
- Leung Siu-chau
- Lee Wan-kwong
- Chan Wai-yu
- Sit Choi-ha
- Soh Hang-suen
- Amy Hu
- Tang Yu-chiu
- Lee Kwok-ping
- Wilson Tsui
- Pau Wai-leung
- Tony Leung
- Wong Sze-yan
- Cheng Siu-ping
- Ng Yuen-fan
- Law Chun-piu
- Ng Wai-san
- Tam Yat-ching
- Ma Wai-ling
- Wong Yat-fei
- Leung Chi-fong
- Koo Po-lai
- Maggie Shiu as Princess Fragrance (香香公主)
- Mak Chi-wan
- Ma Hing-sang
- Lau Miu-ching
- Ho Kwai-lam
- Cheung Chi-keung
- Chan Po-wan
- Yuen Pui-yee
- Liu Ching-han
- Lau Man-chun
- Yip Tin-hang
- So Hon-sang
- Ng Chau-kuen
- Ho Pik-kin
- Cheng Hung-wai
- Lee Hoi-sang
- Chan Yiu-keung

== See also ==
- Andy Lau filmography
