= The Superpower =

1980s Hong Kong television series

- DVD cover
- Genre: Fantasy; Science Fiction; Comedy drama
- Starring: Chow Yun-fat; Tony Leung Chiu-Wai
- Opening theme: (天降財神) by Alan Tam
- Ending theme: by Alan Tam
- Composer: Joseph Koo
- Country of origin: Hong Kong
- Original language: Cantonese
- No. of episodes: 20

Production
- Running time: 45 minutes

Original release
- Network: TVB
- Release: 21 March – 15 April 1983

The Superpower (天降財神) is a TVB Scifi television series, premiered in Hong Kong in 1983.

== Synopsis ==
An extraterrestrial alien who crashed from space landed in Hong Kong, nearly dying from the crash. He survived by inhabiting a human corpse (Chow Yun-fat) and was saved by Kwok Hak-cung, (Tony Leung) who gave him water. The alien then helped Kwok in things such as winning lotteries and other aspects of life.

== Cast ==
Cast	Role	Description
Chow Yun-fat	Alien Tin yat (天日)	Alien who inhabited a human body
Tony Leung	Kwok Hak-zung (郭克松)	
Barbara Chan (陳敏兒)	Hoeng Ho-yan (向可人)	
Patricia Chong (莊靜而)	Cheung Si-man (張思敏)	
