= Xin Juedai Shuangjiao =

1986 Taiwanese wuxia TV series

- 新絕代雙驕
- Genre: Wuxia
- Based on: Juedai Shuangjiao by Gu Long
- Starring: Sharon Yeung; Huang Hsiang-lien
- Opening theme: "Come and Go Elegantly" (翩翩來去) by Fong Fei-fei
- Country of origin: Taiwan
- Original language: Mandarin
- No. of episodes: 30

Production
- Production location: Taiwan
- Running time: ≈ 45 minutes per episode

Original release
- Network: TTV

Xin Juedai Shuangjiao (新絕代雙驕) is a Taiwanese television series adapted from Gu Long's novel Juedai Shuangjiao. The series was first aired on TTV in Taiwan in 1986.

== Cast ==
- Sharon Yeung as Xiaoyuer
- Huang Hsiang-lien as Hua Wuque
- King Doi-yum as Tie Xinlan
- Wong Wai-man as Su Ying
- Su Tsui-yu as Murong Jiu
- Lü Ying-ying as Zhang Jing
- Lung Chuan-jen as Heizhizhu
- Tien Feng as Jiang Biehe
- Cheng Ping-chun as Jiang Yulang
- Chang Fu-mei as Yaoyue
- Chang Min-min as Lianxing
- Ku Cheng as Yan Nantian
- Hao Man as Tu Jiaojiao
- Chen Ya-lien as Tie Pinggu
- Lee Tao-hung as Jiang Feng
- Chang Ying-chen as Hua Yuenu
