= The Legendary Siblings 2 =

2002 Taiwanese wuxia TV series

- DVD cover art
- Also known as: Amazing Twins
- 絕世雙驕
- Genre: Wuxia
- Based on: Juedai Shuangjiao by Gu Long
- Directed by: Lai Shui-ching; Hsia Yu-shun
- Starring: Jimmy Lin; Sattawat Sethakorn; Li Xiaolu; Tien Hsin
- Opening theme: "A World with You" (有你的世界) by Jimmy Lin
- Ending theme: "The Fawn Gets into Accidents" (小鹿亂撞) by Li Xiaolu
- Country of origin: Taiwan
- Original language: Mandarin
- No. of episodes: 40

Production
- Production location: Taiwan
- Running time: ≈ 45 minutes per episode

Original release
- Network: CTS
- Release: 18 January – 15 March 2002

Related
- The Legendary Siblings (1999)

The Legendary Siblings 2 (絕世雙驕), also known as Amazing Twins, is a Taiwanese wuxia television series starring Jimmy Lin and Sattawat Sethakorn. It was first broadcast on CTS in Taiwan from January to March 2002, and was preceded by The Legendary Siblings in 1999. It is loosely adapted from the novel Juedai Shuangjiao by Gu Long, and expands on events after the ending of the novel.

== Synopsis ==
In a once peaceful decade, a mysterious man named Badao appeared among the pugilists of Central Plains. He mercilessly killed the entire troop with his sword fighting skills. Meanwhile, in Baihua Valley, Feng Wuque and Jiang Feiyu appeared to live peacefully with their wives and newborn sons. Then, a group of pugilists led by He Yuntian of Huashan Sect delivered the news and sought for their assistance to retaliate Badao. The two swordsmen left and fought Badao until Yue Longxuan appeared before them. It was later found out that Badao was forced to duel Feng Wuque and Jiang Feiyu in exchange of his family's life, but Yue Longxuan silenced him. Feng Wuque and Jiang Feiyu combined their strength and managed to defeat Yue Longxuan and died. In the meantime, their wives (Xiaofeng and Roulan) were chased by some pugilists and jumped off a cliff with their sons.

Twenty years later in Longyang Town, Xiaoyu, a young man who loves to play pranks and deceive people, lived as a young master to a big gambling house. On the other hand, Wuji grew up as a common woodcutter living with his parents in the outskirts. The two first met in a small shop where Xiaoyu was dining and Wuji supplied wood for the shop owner. Xiaoyu had a "familiar feeling" towards Wuji. Then, Wuji went home from work devastated as he discovered that his house was burnt and his parents were killed. He found a jade pendant which led him to the assumption that Xiaoyu murdered his parents and searched for him to avenge their death.

The Mingyue Palace was attacked by a group of Tianmen scouts but were single-handedly killed by Mingyue, a formidable Chief known to the pugilists world. She then settled to leave her palace for a mission. While running for errands, Xiaoyu met and fought Wuji with a false claim that Xiaoyu murdered Wuji's parents. Wuji spared his life in an agreement that Xiaoyu should determine the real murderer in three months. Their investigation led them to Bu'er Manor linking a piece of evidence they found at Wuji's place. They left for Bu'er City and enlist in the manor's congregation however they needed a recommendation letter as recruits. They secured a letter from an elderly man, who happened to be the Chief Steward of Bu'er Manor. The two passed the registration and joined the strict selection process. After a series of tests, the two succeeded as Bu'er Manor's disciples, met the other entrants, Xiaojiang and Xueyu, and Chang Chun, a divine physician.

During their adventures, Xiaoyu and Wuji met an unnamed skilled swordsman, whom Ziyan was also pursuing. The swordsman looked like the legendary Yan Haotian, Mingyue's former lover. He was used by the Tianmen to lure Mingyue and dispose her since she was a threat to the Tianmen's chief's desire to dominate the pugilist arena. Her fight with the Tianmen sustained her injuries causing Chang Chun to save and cure her. Ziyan also found out that her juniors were massacred by a Tianmen cavalier and struggled to fight him. She was rescued by Xiaoyu and brought her to the manor to recuperate. While at the manor, Xiaoyu and Wuji learned of other mysteries within like headless ghosts, missing artisans, and explosions. Their investigations gave them the answers to secrets in Bu'er Manor - Chief Yuwen Pu is a branch leader of Tianmen. Chief Yuwen Pu intended to kill all the attendants on the day of the congregation and become one of the four main sects leader. A battle was ensued and everyone was locked inside the gathering hall fighting off a poisonous fume and Chief Yuwen Pu was assassinated by Xiaojiang and Xueyu but Wuji was mistakenly identified by Yuwen Shuang as her father's murderer. Meanwhile, Mingyue faced off Yue Longxuan, the Tianmen Chief, and was severely injured. At the manor, everyone was saved by a dying lady, Guo Roulan (Feng Wuque's wife), and revealed that Xiaoyu and Wuji were Jiang Feiyu's and Feng Wuque's sons respectively. This discovery led Chief He Yuntian of Huashan to adopt the two as his disciples and imparted his knowledge in martial arts.

Xiaoyu, Wuji, Ziyan, Dongwei, and Chang Chun left the city in search for Mingyue. The group stopped at Yi Lou, an establishment that trades almost anything, and found Mingyue who was caught with amnesia and served as a hostess with a new name (Xiaolan). Also, Yuwen Shuang was accepted by Zhu Xiaotong, Yi Lou's owner, and sold herself to whoever kills Wuji in her desperation to avenge her father's death. Mingyue's presence at Yi Lou has spread and steered every pugilist to execute her. The group managed to escape from their perpetrators and dwelt at the Evil Forest, where they stayed at Du Qiaoqiao's place. Xiaoyu met Du Qiaoqiao beforehand and is one of the Ten Evils and raised Jiang Feiyu. Zhu Xiaotong later revealed that she is Senior Xiaoyao, Mingyue's disciple, but betrayed her master because of love. The group remained at the Evil Forest until help arrived. While at the forest, Wuji took Yuwen Shuang as his disciple and taught her his sword fighting skills to execute him as a pact they agreed upon whilst Xiaoyu was hypnotized to kill Mingyue/Xiaolan. Xiaoyu's hypnotic state was Du Qiaoqiao's ploy and is apparently a Tianmen branch leader. Xiaoyu, Wuji, and Chang Chun fled the forest to awaken Mingyue's/Xiaolan's power whereas Ziyan, Dongwei, and Yuwen Shuang were captured by Yue Longxuan as bait. Dongwei sacrificed herself with a divine crystal injuring the Tianmen. Chief He Yuntian arrived in time and managed to drive Yue Longxuan and his men.

Ziyan went missing for three months but eventually reunites with Xiayou as he and Wuji searched for Xueyu to retrieve the Tianmen Token. They eventually captured her but was later rescued by Xiaojiang. Again, Xiaoyu was poisoned and helpless as mysteries arise. Yuwen Shuang has forgotten about her hate and revenge towards Wuji. In a while, Chief He Yuntian was revealed to be the man behind the conspiracies and he was in fact Ziyan's father. Xiaoyu's intelligent skills lured He Yuntian into fighting Yue Longxuan, killing him. The shocking revelation caused Xiaoyu's and Ziyan's breakup. With the Huashan Sect's downfall, Wuji was elected as its new chief.

Few months have passed, Xiaojiang announced his treachery with Tianmen and joined forces with Wuji and Xiaoyu at the Golden Eagle Fort under Chief Ye Tianzhao's guidance. Wuji was chosen as the forerunner in directing the pugilists to take down Tianmen. The death of the Winter Threesome, appearance of Duan Tianbao, abduction of Yuwen Shuang, disownment of Xueyu from Tianmen, and the truth behind Xiaojiang's and Wuji's identity caused an uproar at the Golden Eagle Fort and the pugilist arena. At the same time, Ziyan has welcomed Buddhism and decided to become a nun, Wuji has announced his marriage to Yuwen Shuang, and Luo Yunbing/Madam Bing consulted Chang Chun for treatment. After a battle at the fort, Xueyu pleaded for Yue Longxuan's mercy and rejoin Tianmen. She was accepted and initiated her plot against her foster father in attempt to avenge Xiaojiang's supposed death. After a series of events, Xiaoyu decided to undergo training and discipleship under Yao Haotian. In place of Yao Haotian, he was trained by Yan Piaoxiang, Yan Haotian's grand niece, at the Flower Palace. Once more, Xiaoyu reconciled with Ziyan through Yan Piaoxiang's aid. Wuji's relationship with Yue Longxuan caused him to step down as a chief and lived as a commoner. He found Yuwen Shuang, who was reluctant to see him as she feared he might not accept her because of her disfigured face after a tragic fate. Still, Wuji accepted her and lived with her in a farmland.

The Tianmen attacked the Golden Eagle Fort leaving the main characters alive. Mingyu's duel against Yue Longxuan caused her death which shattered Chang Chun, refusing to leave her grave. The remaining survivors (Madam Bing, Duan Tianbao, Boss Yu, Ziyan, Xueyu, and an aide) traveled to Evil Forest to recruit more pugilists to continue their rally against Yue Longxuan. There, they were reunited with Wuji and Yuwen Shuang and the couple were shortly married. After the wedding ceremony, Yuwen Shuang was kidnapped and Xiaojiang appeared to save the group. Wuji was then compelled to be with his father in exchange for Yuwen Shuang. A letter was sent out to challenge Xiaojiang, Feng Wuque's real son, and Xiaoyu to a duel against Wuji. They had an intense fight but Wuji was seen as the victor. Witnessing this, Yue Longxuan was proud of his son's achievement but he was enraged when Xiaoyu revealed himself disguised as Wuji. As the combat continued, Xiaoyu was saved by Madam Bing's and Duan Tianbao's tandem. Madam Bing soon exposed herself as Yue Longxuan's wife and Wuji's biological mother. Yue Longxuan begged for his wife's forgiveness as his actions led him in misery. As Madam Bing was about to give in, Yue Longxuan assaulted her but Wuji blocked his attack, severely injuring him. This infuriated Yue Longxuan and he was bound by guilt driving him mad. At the end, Wuji accepted his fate as Yue Longxuan's son but chose the path of righteousness thanking Xiaoyu and the rest of the gang.

== Cast ==
- Jimmy Lin as Xiaoyu / Jiang Feiyu
- Sattawat Sethakorn as Wuji
- Steve Ma as Badao
- Alec Su as Feng Wuque
- Stephanie Hsiao as Yan Piaoxiang
- Li Xiaolu as Ziyan
- Tien Hsin as Yuwen Shuang
- Lawrence Ng as Chang Chun
- Yu Li as Mingyue
- Zheng Guolin as Xiaojiang
- Chang Jui-chu as Xueyu
- Vivi Ho as Doudou
- Shadow Liu as Dongwei
- Elvis Tsui as Boss Yu
- Michael Huang as Yan Haotian
- Wang Tao as Yue Longxuan
- Huang Chun-lung as Duan Tianbao
- Ku Kuan-chung as Yuwen Pu
- Chen Kuan-tai as Ye Tianzhao
- Liu Chi-shu as Dongwei
- Tien Niu as Zhu Xiaotong
- Ge Lei as Du Qiaoqiao
- Yang Tze-chung as He Yuntian
- You Ya as Mo Bing
- Jin Qiaoqiao as Guo Ruolan
- Li Niu as Ma Zongguan
- Wang Zhengquan as Yuan Qiu
- Zhu Yan as Xiaofeng
- Yue Yueli as Wuji's foster father
- Dai Chunrong as Wuji's foster mother
- Dong Zhiqiang as Li Hu
- Jin Shugui as Qishu
- Wu Qiang as Lei Jianpi
- Wang Zhengjia as Yu Jianfeng
- Lu Yong as Yuwen Ji
- Jiang Yi as Zhou Li
