= 2003 RTHK Top 10 Gold Songs Awards =

Hong Kong music awards ceremony

The 2003 RTHK Top 10 Gold Songs Awards (Chinese: 第二十六屆十大中文金曲頒獎音樂會) was held in 2003 for the 2002 music season.

== Top 10 song awards ==
The top 10 songs (十大中文金曲) of 2003 are as follows.

Song name in Chinese	Artist	Composer	Lyricist
可惜我是水瓶座	Miriam Yeung	Mark Lui	Wyman Wong
三角誌	Candy Lo	Mark Lui	Wyman Wong
合久必婚	Hacken Lee	Ronald Ng (伍樂城)	Albert Leung
風箏與風	Twins	Ronald Ng (伍樂城)	Albert Leung
十面埋伏	Eason Chan	Eric Kwok	Wyman Wong
我的驕傲	Joey Yung	Chan Kwong-Wing	Wyman Wong
無間道	Andy Lau, Tony Leung Chiu-Wai	Ronald Ng (伍樂城)	Albert Leung
好心好報	Alex Fong	Mark Lui	Fong git (方杰)
七友	Edmond Leung	Mark Lui	Albert Leung
左鄰右里	Alan Tam, Hacken Lee	Mark Lui	Hacken Lee

== Other awards ==
Award	Song or album (if available)	Recipient
Best new male prospect award (最有前途新人獎)	-	(gold) Hins Cheung (silver) Deep Ng (bronze) Don Li
Best new female prospect award (最有前途新人獎)	-	(gold) Wang rong (王蓉) (silver) Wong hing (黃馨) (bronze) Stephanie Cheng
Best group prospect award (最有前途新人獎)	-	(gold) Boy'z (silver) 2R (bronze) at17
CASH international best Chinese song award (CASH全球華語最佳新進作曲人獎)	-	Hins Cheung
CASH international best Chinese lyrics award (CASH全球華語最佳新進作詞人獎)	-	Hins Cheung
Outstanding Mandarin song award (優秀國語歌曲獎)	兄妹 遇見 今天沒回家	(gold) Eason Chan, Peco Chui (徐偉賢), Albert Leung (silver) Stefanie Sun, Chet Lam, Yi ga-joeng (易家揚) (bronze) David Tao, Waa waa (娃娃)
Sales award for male artists (全年最高銷量歌手大獎)	-	Hacken Lee, Eason Chan, Jay Chou
Sales award for female artists (全年最高銷量歌手大獎)	-	Sammi Cheng, Joey Yung, Twins
Leap award for male singer (飛躍大獎)	-	(gold) Jordan Chan (silver) Edmond Leung (bronze) Ronald Cheng
Leap award for female singer (飛躍大獎)	-	(gold) Gigi Leung (silver) Twins (bronze) Jade Kwan, Denise Ho
National best Chinese song award (全國最受歡迎中文歌曲獎)	如果有一天 兩個人的幸運 遇見	(gold) Andy Lau Gigi Leung, Peter Kam, Albert Leung (bronze) Stefanie Sun, Chet Lam, Yi ga-joeng (易家揚)
National most popular male singer award (全國最受歡迎歌手獎)	-	(gold) Andy Lau (silver) David Tao (bronze) Jay Chou
National most popular female singer award (全國最受歡迎歌手獎)	-	(gold) Stefanie Sun (silver) Gigi Leung (bronze) Kelly Chen
National most popular group award (全國最受歡迎歌手獎)	-	(gold) Twins (silver) S.H.E (bronze) F4
Mainland recommendation award (內地推薦大獎)	-	Lee Quan (李泉)
International Chinese award (全球華人至尊金曲)	我的驕傲	Joey Yung, Chan Kwong-Wing, Wyman Wong
Four channel award (四台聯頒獎項)	-	Twins, Jade Kwan, Denise Ho
RTHK Golden needle award (金針獎)	-	Richard Lam
