= Mack the Knife (1995 film) =

1995 Hong Kong film by Lee Chi-ngai

- Traditional Chinese: 流氓醫生
- Simplified Chinese: 流氓医生
- Hanyu Pinyin: Liú Máng Yī Shēng
- Jyutping: Lau4 Man4 Ji1 Sang1
- Directed by: Lee Chi-ngai
- Screenplay by: Lee Chi-ngai
- Based on: Dr. Kumahige by Buronson
- Produced by: Lee Chi-ngai
- Starring: Tony Leung; Sean Lau; Alex To; Christy Chung
- Cinematography: Bill Wong
- Edited by: Henry Cheung
- Music by: Eugene Pao
- Production company: United Filmmakers Organisation
- Distributed by: Golden Harvest
- Release date: 17 February 1995
- Running time: 98 minutes
- Country: Hong Kong
- Language: Cantonese
- Box office: HK$16,832,931

Mack the Knife, also known as Dr. Mack, is a 1995 Hong Kong comedy-drama film written, produced and directed by Lee Chi-ngai, based on the manga Dr. Kumahige by Buronson and Takumi Nagaysu. The film stars Tony Leung, Sean Lau, Alex To, Christy Chung, and Gigi Leung in her debut film role.

== Plot ==
Dr. Mack Lau is a cynical person on the surface, but he is actually very delicate and has a strong insight of the world. He despises the injustice of the health care system and runs his own clinic in a red-light district. Indulged in medical science, Mack possess superior medical skills and is passionate in treating underprivileged citizens. Among his patients include a brave policeman, Chiu, his neighbor prostitutes and so on. Aside from healing his patient's wounds, Mack is also willing to listen to their thoughts and become their friend. However, Mack was later framed by his old friend and medical classmate, Roger Law, and must face the crisis of his doctor's license being revoked.

== Cast ==
- Tony Leung Chiu-wai as Dr. Mack Lau
- Sean Lau as Chiu
- Alex To as Dr. Roger Law
- Christy Chung as Jamie
- Andy Hui as Dr. Sam So
- Hilary Tsui as Zin
- Law Kar-ying as Wong Jau
- Eileen Tung as Lok Mei
- Richard Ng as Professor Pau
- Jordan Chan as Tattoo Choir's conductor
- Gigi Leung as May
- Law Ka as May's dad
- Lawrence Ng as K.T.
- Jessica Chow as Fung
- Wong He as Tiger
- Farini Cheung as Nurse
- Wyman Wong as Brother Fook
- Jerry Lamb as Tong Ching
- Wong Wa-wo as Secretary Fok
- Winston Yeh as Hospital chief
- Chan Siu-kwan as Hospital assistant chief
- Louise Poon as Secretary
- Mike Lau as Mikey
- Jeff Lee as Student
- Adrian Kwan as Tak
- William To as Dr. Tony
- Chan Ka-him as Kent
- Ng Kwok-kan as Tattoo Choir's member
- Tang Wing-yiu as Tattoo Choir's member
- James Cheung as Tattoo Choir's member #2
- Lee Wai-cheung as Tattoo Choir's member
- Jacob Cheung as Tattoo Choir's member #4
- Ben Luk as Tattoo Choir's member #5
- Benny Tse as Tattoo Choir's member #6
- Hau Ang as Fook's thug
- Chang Yuk-chuen as Fook's thug
- Samuel Leung as Fook's thug
- Sin Min-kei as Fook's thug
- Lee Fook-ching as Fook's thug
- Chi Chi-ngai as Assassin
- Wong Ching-wai as Assassin
- Chu Ka-yin as Robber
- Kwok Chi-cheung as Robber
- Tsang Kit-ying as Chi
- Emana Leung as Hooker
- Tom Tom as Hooker
- Chan Yin-ngai as Hooker
- Jason Chu as Missionary
- Lynn Levery as Missionary
- James O'Connell as Missionary
- Mike Staley as Missionary
- Dianna Cassills as Missionary
- Vastine Pettis as Missionary
- Sharon Williams as Gospel singer
- Jarry Hammond as Saxophone player
- Ma Suk-lin as Wei
- Lau Yan-leung as Cororner
- Cheung Lai-kwan as Nurse
- Yu Chun-fung as Reporter
- Sue Ka-man as Chairman of Medical Review Board
- Chan Chi-ban as Medical Review Board
- Bo Chan as Medical Review Board
- Stephen Wong as Chi's dad
- Leung Kui as Uncle Ho
- Marco Lo as Roger's student
- June Chan as Roger's student
- Ng Yuk-yin as Roger's student
- Fuk Oi-yan as Roger's student

== Reception ==
=== Critical ===
LoveHKFilm gave the film a positive review praising Lee Chi-ngai's direction and script as "sophisticated" and "affecting" as well as Tony Leung's performance. Hong Kong Film Net gave the film a score of 6 out of 10 praising the characters but criticizing the lack of story.

=== Box office ===
The film grossed HK$16,832,931 at the Hong Kong box office during its theatrical run from 17 February to 22 March 1995.
