= The Legendary Siblings =

1999 Taiwanese wuxia TV series

- VCD cover art
- 絕代雙驕
- Genre: Wuxia
- Based on: Juedai Shuangjiao by Gu Long
- Directed by: Lee Kwok-lap
- Starring: Jimmy Lin; Alec Su
- Opening theme: "Utmost Happiness" (快樂至上) by Jimmy Lin
- Ending theme: "Live One Day for You" (只要為你活一天) by Nicholas Tse
- Country of origin: Taiwan
- Original language: Mandarin
- No. of episodes: 40

Production
- Production location: Taiwan
- Running time: 45 minutes per episode

Original release
- Network: TTV
- Release: 1 May 1999

Related
- The Legendary Siblings 2 (2002)

The Legendary Siblings (絕代雙驕) is a Taiwanese television series adapted from Gu Long's novel Juedai Shuangjiao. The series was directed by Lee Kwok-lap and starred Jimmy Lin and Alec Su. It was first broadcast on TTV in Taiwan in 1999 and was followed by The Legendary Siblings 2 in 2002.

== Cast ==
- Jimmy Lin as Xiaoyuer
- Alec Su as Hua Wuque
- Vivian Chen as Tie Xinlan
- Theresa Lee as Zhang Jing
- Yu Li as Yaoyue
- Chang Jui-chu as Lianxing
- Lin Jui-yang as Yan Nantian
- Chen Chun-sheng as Jiang Feng
- Stephanie Shiao as Hua Yuenu
- Power Chan as Heizhizhu
- Kevin Cheng as Jiang Yulang
- Sang Ni as Tie Pinggu
- Li Li-chun as Li Dazui
- Ge Lei as Tu Jiaojiao
- Berg Ng as Du Sha
- Lu Ting-yu as Hahaer
- Tsai Chia-hung as Xiaomimi
- Liu Chia-jung as Tie Zhan
- Lou Hsueh-hsian as Xuanyuan Sanguang
- Liu Shang-chian as Wan Chunliu
- Hou Ping-ying as Murong Jiu
- Lien Ching-wen as Hai Hongzhu
- Wang Tao as Jiang Biehe
