= The Proud Twins (TV series) =

2005 Chinese-Hong Kong wuxia TV series

- DVD cover art
- Also known as: The Handsome Siblings; The Perfect Twins; The Invincible Duo; The Amazing Twins
- 小鱼儿与花无缺
- Genre: Wuxia
- Based on: Juedai Shuangjiao by Gu Long
- Screenplay by: Wong Jing; Wu Ren
- Directed by: Wong Jing
- Presented by: Tie Fo; Ma Zhongjun
- Starring: Dicky Cheung; Nicholas Tse; Fan Bingbing; Yuan Quan
- Theme music composer: Nicholas Tse; Sun Weiming; Harry Ng
- Opening theme: "Yellow Race" (黄种人) by Nicholas Tse
- Ending theme: "Superman" (超人) by Dicky Cheung
- Composers: Carl Ng; Billy Chan
- Countries of origin: China; Hong Kong
- Original language: Mandarin
- No. of episodes: 45

Production
- Producers: Zhang Huaiqiang; Duan Weiming
- Production location: China
- Cinematography: Meng Mingxin
- Editor: Wang Yun
- Running time: ≈ 45 minutes per episode
- Production companies: Ciwen Pictures; Beijing Fuyuan Film Culture

The Proud Twins (小鱼儿与花无缺) is a 2005 Chinese–Hong Kong wuxia television series adapted from the novel Juedai Shuangjiao by Gu Long. Directed by Wong Jing, it starred cast members from mainland China and Hong Kong, including Dicky Cheung, Nicholas Tse, Fan Bingbing, and Yuan Quan.

== Cast ==
- Dicky Cheung as Xiaoyuer
- Nicholas Tse as Hua Wuque
- Fan Bingbing as Tie Xinlan
- Yuan Quan as Su Ying
- Bo Xue as Murong Xian
- Elvis Tsui as E Tongtian
- Yang Xue as Jiang Yuyan
- Liu Yiwei as Hongye
- Zhang Jizhong as Old Hongye
- Wu Qingzhe as Yan Nantian
- Raymond Wong Ho-yin as Jiang Feng
- Sun Feifei as Hua Yuenu
- Wang Bozhao as Jiang Biehe
- Yumiko Cheng as Jiang Yufeng
- Kong Lin as Yaoyue
- Ni Jingyang as Lianxing
- Li Guohua as Liu Xi
- Zhang Shuangli as Chang Baicao
- Liu Hongmei as Su Rushi
- Wei Hua as Hua Xingnu
- Zhao Xiaorui as Murong Wudi
- Zhu Yan as Murong Shu
- Celest Chong as Princess Taka
- Cheng Sihan as Li Dazui
- Sun Jiaolong as Du Sha
- Sui Yongqing as Tu Jiaojiao
- Bai Yu as Yin Jiuyou
- Haha as Haha'er
- Yang Xiaoyang as Mrs Jiang
- Adam Chen as Murong Zhong
- Xu Min as Murong Zheng
- Li Zhenqi as Tie Ruyun
- Zhang Jianguo as Wushou
- Zhang Guoqing as Wujiao
- Wang Hanwen as Tantian
- Ye Jing as Shuodi
- Zhang Jin as Xiaoxiao
- Sheng Jingyan as Si Qin

== Broadcasts ==
Region	Network	Dates	Timings
Mainland China		2005	
Taiwan	Gala Television	2005	
Hong Kong	ATV	8 August - 30 September 2005	22:00 - 23:00 on weekdays

== Alternate theme songs ==
- Libie Jiu (離別酒) by Jang Ho-cheol, the opening theme song of the Taiwanese version.
- Mei Name Ai Ta (沒那麼愛他) by Christine Fan, the ending theme song of the Taiwanese version.
