= Jaime Chik =

Hong Kong actress

- 戚美珍
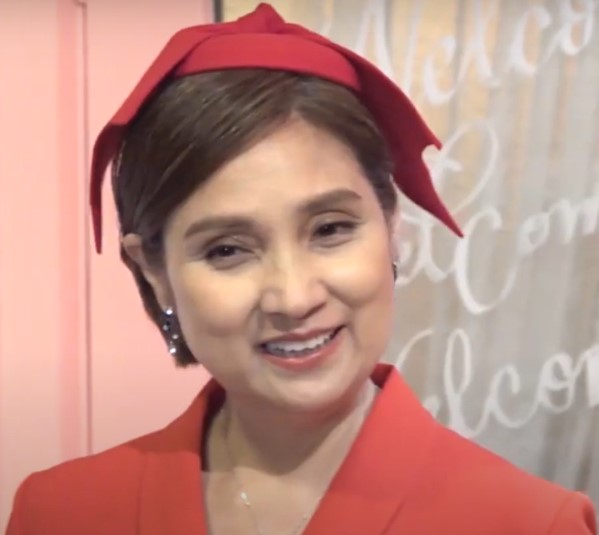
- July 2019
- Born: 5 January 1962 (age 64); British Hong Kong
- Occupation: Actress
- Years active: 1981–1995, 2008–present
- Spouse: Michael Miu (m. 1990)
- Children: Phoebe Miu (daughter) (born 1991); Murphy Miu (son) (born 1993)

Jaime Chik Mei-chun (Chinese: 戚美珍, born 5 January 1962) is a Hong Kong TVB actress and was named as one of the Five Beauties of TVB.

== Personal life ==
Chik met Hong Kong actor Michael Miu in 1981 while shooting for the TVB television drama You Only Live Twice. The couple married in 1990 and since have two children: daughter Phoebe Miu (born 1991) and son Murphy Miu (born 1993).

== Filmography ==
Film
Year	Title	Role	Notes
1983	The Perfect Wife?!	Bluffer's wife	
1983	Seeding of a Ghost	May	
1984	Pom Pom	May	
1984	Invitation of Ghost	Hsueh Lan	
1985	Twinkle, Twinkle Lucky Stars	May (Amy in subtitles)	Guest star
1988	The Crazy Companies II	Restaurant customer	Guest star
1989	Mr. Smart	May	
1990	The Fortune Code	nurse	Guest star
1995	Whatever Will Be, Will Be	Student's mom	
2010	72 Tenants of Prosperity	tenant	Guest star
2016	Fooling Around Jiang Hu		

Television
Year	Title	Role	Notes
1982	You Only Live Twice	Cheung Lok-man	
1982	Kuo San Cheh	Sing So-man	
1984	The Smiling, Proud Wanderer	Ngok Ling-san	
1984	Holy Flame of the Martial World	Wan Dan-fung	
1985	The Flying Fox of Snowy Mountain	Ngai Ying-suet	
1985	The Yang's Saga	Ching-lin	
1985	Police Cadet '85	Yip Hiu-nam	
1986	The Turbulent Decade	Cho Kam-yee	
1986	The Unyielding Master Lim	Lei See-see	
1987	The Seasons	Bing	
1987	Heir to the Throne Is...	Yeung So-san	
1987	The Legend of the Book and the Sword	Yuk Yu-yee	
1988	Behind Silk Curtains	Lam Ling-chi	
1988	Two Most Honorable Knights	Fa Yuet-no	
1991	Stepping Out	Fong Yee-tsan	
1992	The Rise and Fall of Qing Dynasty IV	Consort Zhen	
2009	Born Rich	Ho Tseuk-nin (Connie)	Nominated - TVB Award for Best Actress; Nominated - TVB Award for My Favourite Female Character
2010	My Better Half	nurse	Guest star ep. 20
2012	Tasting Life	host	
2013	Flower Pinellia (Flower Open in the Middle of Summer)	Xia Lin (Ru Hua's mother)	
