= Carina Lau =

Hong Kong actress (born 1965)

- 劉嘉玲
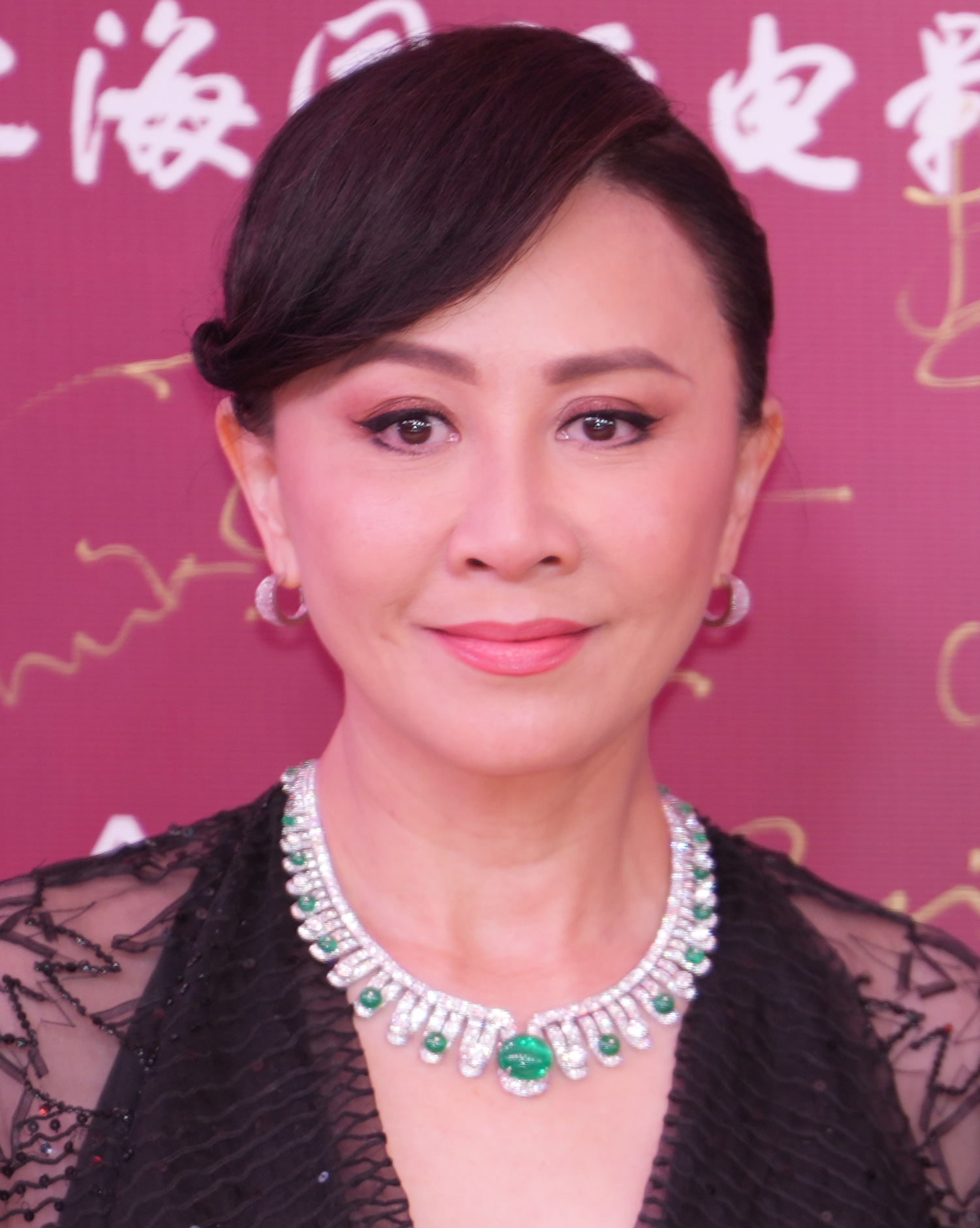
- Lau at 2026 Shanghai International Film Festival
- Born: Liu Jialing; 8 December 1965 (age 60); Suzhou, Jiangsu, China
- Education: Kiangsu-Chekiang College
- Occupation: Actress
- Years active: 1983–present
- Spouse: Tony Leung (m. 2008)
- Musical career
- Genres: Mandopop
- Instrument: Vocals
- Labels: EMI (1994–1996); Carina Lau Studio (present)

Chinese name
- Traditional Chinese: 劉嘉玲
- Simplified Chinese: 刘嘉玲
Transcriptions
Standard Mandarin
- Hanyu Pinyin: Liú Jiālíng
Yue: Cantonese
- Jyutping: Lau4 Gaa1-ling4

Carina Lau Kar-ling (Chinese: 劉嘉玲; Jyutping: Lau4 Gaa1-ling4; born 8 December 1965) is a Hong Kong actress and singer. She started her acting career at TVB, before achieving success with her girl-next-door roles in the 1980s' Hong Kong films. She is also known for her role as Empress Wu Zetian in Tsui Hark's Detective Dee film series. Lau won Best Actress at the Nantes Three Continents Festival for Days of Being Wild (1990), at the Golden Rooster Awards for Curiosity Kills the Cat (2006), and at the Hong Kong Film Awards for Detective Dee and the Mystery of the Phantom Flame (2010).

== Early life ==
Lau was born on 1965 in Suzhou, Jiangsu, with her ancestral home in Rong County, Guangxi, to Lau Gwai Ming (1940–2006) and Wong Fuk Mui (born 1944).

Lau's paternal grandfather moved to Thailand in 1935 to make a living and later moved to the country with his wife in 1938, just before the Canton Operation during the Second Sino-Japanese War. Lau's father, Lau Gwai Ming, was born in Thailand on 1940. Lau's father returned to China in 1955 and with the help of All-China Federation of Returned Overseas Chinese, he studied at a junior high school in Guangzhou and high school in Suzhou. Following the start of Cultural Revolution in 1965, overseas Chinese who returned to China were targets of criticism. Lau's father moved to Hong Kong in 1976, while Lau moved to Hong Kong with her mother and brother in 1978, and joined TVB's acting class in 1983.

== Career ==
Lau made her on-screen debut in TVB's The Clones (1984) where she starred opposite of her future husband, Tony Leung. She gained wider recognition after a series of appearances in successful drama series such as The Duke of Mount Deer and Police Cadet and skyrocketed to fame following her role as a wealthy heiress in one of Hong Kong's most-watched ever series, Looking Back in Anger (1989).

Lau then expanded to films. She was nominated at the Hong Kong Film Award for Best Actress for her role in Her Beautiful Life Lies (1989). She received acclaim for her role in Days of Being Wild (1991), one of her many collaborations with film director Wong Kar-wai. She continued to showcase her versatility with impressive performances in the martial arts epic Saviour of the Soul (1991), the biopic Center Stage (1991), the cross-dressing comedy He's a Woman, She's a Man (1994), and the offbeat romance Gigolo and Whore (1994). Following parts in the wuxia classic Ashes of Time (1994) and James Bond pastiche Forbidden City Cop (1997), Lau once again attracted the attention of various awards juries with her measured portrayals of bisexual silk factory owner Wan in Intimates (1997) and a prostitute in the 19th-century epic Flowers of Shanghai (1998).

Her roles as Hon Sam's wife in the two Infernal Affairs sequels and an android in Wong Kar-wai's 2046 (2004) further increased Lau's international recognition. Lau then stepped in the shoes of Sarah Jessica Parker for the Hong Kong version of Sex and the City, named Sex and the Beauties (2004). She won rave reviews for her performances as unhappily-married Rose in the low-budget thriller Curiosity Kills the Cat (2006) and as Wu Zetian in the blockbuster Detective Dee and the Mystery of the Phantom Flame (2010), which earned her a Golden Rooster Award for Best Actress and a Hong Kong Film Award for Best Actress, respectively. She reprised her role as Wu Zetian in two Detective Dee prequels. She received a Best Actress nomination at the Cannes Film Festival for her role as a rich housewife abandoned by her husband in Bends (2013).

In 2016, Lau was one of the celebrities that appeared on the Chinese reality show Up Idol. Since then, she has made guest appearances in other mainland reality TV shows. In June 2017, she and her husband were invited to become a member of the Academy of Motion Picture Arts and Sciences. In 2021, she hosted Reflection, a short web series interviewing various female celebrities.

In 2024, she hosted the Jiangsu TV talk show Jia Ren Zi You Yue.

=== Other activities ===
She was executive president of Hong Kong's TVMART channel, but was replaced by the board after a loss of 40 million Taiwan Dollars. She told the media that because she had no education, the decisions made by her had some negative influences on the company.

== Incidents ==
=== 1990 abduction ===
While filming Days of Being Wild in 1990, Lau disappeared, and Reuters news agency later reported that the actress had been kidnapped, although a police report was not filed. She was safely retrieved after two hours, and in 2008 revealed that she had been abducted by four men working for a triad boss who forced her to strip and took photos of her topless as punishment for refusing a film offer. Lau stated that no sexual assault took place.

=== 2002 East Week magazine photo ===
In October 2002, East Week magazine published a nude photo of an "unnamed female star" in visible distress whose face was partially blurred. The public quickly connected the photo to Lau's abduction 12 years prior, and Lau confirmed that she was the person in the photo.

Massive protests broke out in the following days, led by various Hong Kong entertainment guilds and citizen groups. Media ethics by Hong Kong tabloids and gossip magazines were questioned. Hong Kong police became involved and East Week was forced to shut down a few days later. It eventually restarted in late 2003 under new ownership. In 2009, Mong Hanming, the chief editor of East Week at the time of the incident, received a 5-month jail sentence after pleading guilty to publishing obscene photos.

== Personal life ==
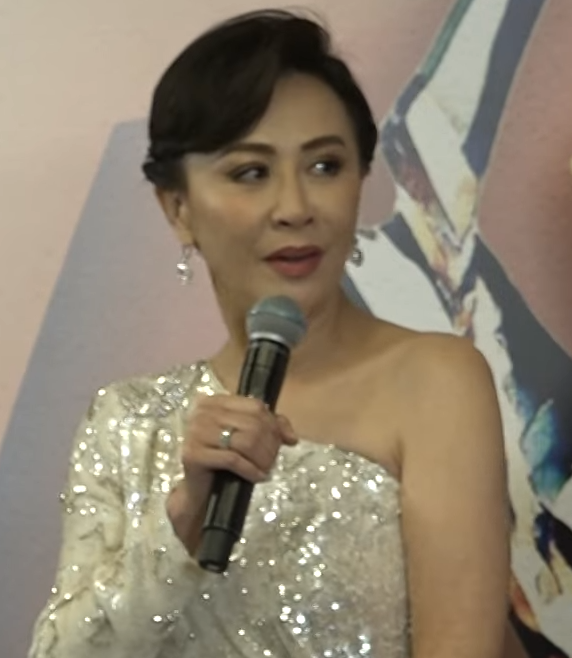
Lau in 2023

Lau's first known relationship was with advertising executive Lee Lin-fu in 1983, when she was 18 and working at an advertising firm. She discovered Lee's marriage in the middle of their relationship. They broke up in 1986, after Lau knew Hong Kong tycoon Julian Hui.

In 1985, Lau was rumored to have been in a secret relationship with actor Lam Chun-yin. According to Lam's godbrother, Hu Jie, the relationship lasted until 1992, and Lau's publicly reported relationship with Tony Leung during that time was a promotional arrangement orchestrated by TVB. Hu claimed that Lam left the entertainment industry to protect Lau's career, but the relationship still failed due to her limited time for him. Lam, however, denied the romance, stating that they were merely co-stars and that his departure from the industry was unrelated.

In 1986, Lau began dating businessman Julian Hui, the grandson of shipping magnate Hui Oi-chow, after being introduced by actress Sandra Ng. They lived together and, in March 1987, Lau unilaterally announced an upcoming wedding at a press conference. However, the Hui family denied knowledge of the engagement, and Julian Hui clarified that although marriage had been discussed, no plans had been finalized. In April 1988, Hui publicly announced the cancellation of the engagement, and the couple separated later that year.

Since 1989, Lau has been in a relationship with actor Tony Leung, following their collaboration in a Hong Kong stage production of Run For Your Wife. Although they never announced a breakup during their long relationship, reports of tensions and romantic entanglements involving other parties emerged over the years.

In 1993, Lau was linked to Hong Kong businessman Joseph Lo, and the two were photographed embracing and kissing on a street in Happy Valley late at night. When Lo attempted suicide in 2000 following business failures, Lau responded to questions about him by saying, "What does that have to do with me?" In a 2002 interview, Lo claimed she distanced herself after hearing about his suicide attempt.

In 2000, Next Magazine reported that Lau had begun a relationship with Lee Siu-man, the son of her former boyfriend, Lee Lin-fu. The two were seen vacationing together in Thailand, while Tony Leung was attending a film festival in Tokyo. Lau and Lee were reportedly observed spending the night together, prompting Leung to temporarily move out of their shared residence. Although he later hosted a birthday party for Lau and posed affectionately with her for photographers to dispel breakup rumors, further sightings of Lau with Lee in February, followed by speculation of a rekindled romance with Julian Hui in March 2001, led Leung to move out again. He returned in May, but renewed speculation of a split emerged in June when Lau was seen attending the World Cup in Japan with Hui, while Leung's birthday passed without public acknowledgment. The couple reportedly lived apart again in September 2001. In 2003, Leung and Lau moved into a new residence in Leung's Mid-Levels property. That same year, Leung publicly supported Lau during a protest by more than 500 Hong Kong entertainers against East Week.

In 2007, Taiwanese tycoon Terry Gou publicly expressed romantic interest in Lau, confirming to the media that their relationship had "just started" and stating he was "serious" about her. Lau responded by saying that Leung was aware of the situation. The relationship ended after Lau reportedly told Gou, "I'm not worthy of you."

Lau and Leung married on 21 July 2008 at the COMO Uma Paro hotel in Bhutan. The wedding reportedly cost more than HK$30 million, and Lau's 12-carat Cartier wedding ring was valued at over HK$10 million. Guests included singer Faye Wong, who performed at the ceremony, and director Wong Kar-wai, who oversaw the event.

Rumors have long circulated that Leung and actress Maggie Cheung were romantically involved, particularly following In the Mood for Love (2000), with subsequent speculation about a feud between Lau and Cheung. In 2013, Lau appeared to put the rumors to rest by posting a photo of herself with Cheung on social media. When asked about the alleged affair in a 2016 interview on The Jin Xing Show, Lau responded, "It's just a beautiful story," and added that she "knows about the affair as much as the public does."

== Filmography ==
=== Film ===
Year	Title	Role	Notes/Ref.
1986	Naughty Boys	Bonnie	
1987	Project A Part II	Carina	
1987	Rich and Famous	Lau Po-yee	
1987	Tragic Hero	Lau Po-yee	
1988	The Romancing Star II	Fong Fong	
1988	Profile of Pleasure	Miss Chu	
1988	City Warriors	Mak Ying-yang	
1988	Heart to Hearts		
1989	Return of the Lucky Stars	Banana Tso	
1989	China White	Yin-hung	
1989	Four Loves	Siu-guen	
1989	Her Beautiful Life Lies	Carole Chang	Nominated—Hong Kong Film Award for Best Actress
1990	She Shoots Straight	Huang Cha-ling	
1990	Queen's Bench III	Ms. Chen	
1990	Days of Being Wild	Mimi/Lulu	Three Continents Festival for Best Actress; Nominated—Hong Kong Film Award for Best Actress; Nominated—Golden Horse Award for Best Actress
1991	The Banquet	Woman at dinner	
1991	Saviour of the Soul	Madam of Pets	
1991	Gigolo and Whore	Chung Siu-hung	Nominated—Hong Kong Film Award for Best Actress
1991	Center Stage	Li Lili	
1991	My American Grandson	Jiao Li	
1992	The Night Rider	Laura	
1992	Girls Without Tomorrow 1992	Wa	
1992	Now You See Love, Now You Don't	Susan Chong	
1993	Lord of East China Sea	Ms. Liu	
1993	Lord of East China Sea 2	Ms. Liu	
1993	Shadow Cop	Witty	
1993	Crazy Hong Kong	Shirley	
1993	Rose Rose I Love You	Pearl Chan/White Rose	
1993	Lover of the Swindler	Ling	
1993	Lady Super Cop	Wenine Chang Mi-hua	
1993	No More Love, No More Death	Ching-ching	
1993	The Eagle Shooting Heroes	Zhou Botong	
1993	He Ain't Heavy, He's My Father	Laura Watt	
1993	C'est la vie, mon chéri	Tracy	
1994	He's a Woman, She's a Man	Rose	
1994	Ashes of Time	Peach Blossom	
1994	Deadful Melody	Tan Yuehua	
1996	Who's the Woman, Who's the Man	Rose	
1996	Forbidden City Cop	Kar-ling	
1997	Intimates	Wan	Golden Bauhinia Award for Best Actress; Nominated—Hong Kong Film Award for Best Actress
1998	Love Generation Hong Kong	Maggie	
1998	Flowers of Shanghai	Pearl	
2001	La Brassiere	Samantha	
2001	Cop Shop Babes	Mona Lui	
2002	Mighty Baby	Samantha	
2003	Infernal Affairs II	Mary	Nominated—Hong Kong Film Award for Best Actress
2003	Infernal Affairs III	Mary	
2004	2046	Mimi/Lulu, 2046 android	
2004	Itchy Heart	Bing	
2004	Sex and the Beauties	Selina	
2006	Curiosity Kills the Cat	Rose Feng	Golden Rooster Award for Best Actress; Nominated—Golden Horse Award for Best Actress
2010	Detective Dee and the Mystery of the Phantom Flame	Wu Zetian	Hong Kong Film Award for Best Actress
2010	Let the Bullets Fly	Governor's Wife	Nominated—Golden Horse Award for Best Supporting Actress; Nominated—Hong Kong Film Award for Best Supporting Actress
2011	All's Well, Ends Well 2011	Mona Tai	
2013	Bends	Anna	Nominated—Cannes Film Festival Award for Best Actress
2013	Young Detective Dee: Rise of the Sea Dragon	Wu Zetian	Nominated—Hong Kong Film Award for Best Supporting Actress
2014	Beijing Love Story	Jia Ling	
2015	From Vegas to Macau II	Molly	
2015	Cairo Declaration	Soong Mei-ling	
2016	From Vegas to Macau III	Molly	
2018	Asura	Asura King, Head of Cunning	
2018	A Beautiful Moment	Dr. Bo	
2018	Detective Dee: The Four Heavenly Kings	Wu Zetian	
2018	In Your Dreams	Ye Ruomei	Also producer
2019	A City Called Macau	Sister Faye	
2019	The Great Detective	Madam	
2021	Dynasty Warriors	Master of the Sword Forge Castle	
2022	Warriors of Future	Tam Bing	
2026	Kung Fu Soccer	Grandmaster of Emei Sect	

=== Television ===
Year	Title	Role	Notes
1983	Legend of the Condor Heroes		
1984	The Clones	Zhong Jieyi	
1984	The Duke of Mount Deer	Fong Yee	
1984	Police Cadet	Cheung Ka-man	
1984	Pau Ching Tin The Law Enforcer	Bao Ling	
1984	Hero Without Tears II	Die Wu	
1985	The Young Wanderer		
1985	Police Cadet '85	Cheung Ka-man	
1985	To Each Its Own	Gu Ruishan	
1985	The Yang's Saga	Princess Chai	
1985	Take Care, Your Highness!	Suen Fuk-yu	
1985	The Middle Aged Fancy		
1985	Tough Fight		
1986	The Feud of Two Brothers		
1986	Du Xinwu		
1986	The Turbulent Decade		
1988	Naked Ambition		
1988	Lemon Husband		
1988	Police Cadet 1988	Cheung Ka-man	
1989	Shanghai Storm		
1989	Looking Back in Anger	Sandy Ngai Chor Gwun	
1989	Fate in Our Hands		
1990	When the Sun Shines	Cameo	Episode 94
1996	Once Upon an Ordinary Girl		
1996	Hua Zhi		
2000	Showbiz Tycoon	Lui Mung-wah	
2001	My Love, Rose		
2005	The Spring River Flows East		
2016	Up Idol	As Herself	Season 2
2018	The Destiny of White Snake	Queen Mother of the West	
2019	The Love by Hypnotic		cameo
2020	Eighteen Springs	Gu Manlu	
2021	Reflection	As Herself	host

== Discography ==
Year	Album	Notes
1994	My Real Love (真情流露)	with Tony Leung
1995	Believe in Love (相信愛情)	
1996	Cooling Love (情冷卻)	

== Awards and nominations ==
Year	Award	Nominated work	Category	Result
1989	Hong Kong Film Award	Her Beautiful Life Lies	Best Actress	Nominated
1990	Hong Kong Film Award	Days of Being Wild	Best Actress	Nominated
1991	Hong Kong Film Award	Days of Being Wild	Best Actress	Nominated
1991	Golden Horse Awards	Days of Being Wild	Best Actress	Nominated
1991	Three Continents Festival	Days of Being Wild	Best Actress	Won
1991	Hong Kong Film Award	Gigolo and Whore	Best Actress	Nominated
1998	Hong Kong Film Award	Intimates	Best Actress	Nominated
1998	Golden Bauhinia Awards	Intimates	Best Actress	Won
2004	Hong Kong Film Award	Infernal Affairs II	Best Actress	Nominated
2006	Golden Horse Awards	Curiosity Kills the Cat	Best Actress	Nominated
2007	Golden Rooster Awards	Curiosity Kills the Cat	Best Actress	Won
2011	Hong Kong Film Award	Detective Dee and the Mystery of the Phantom Flame	Best Actress	Won
2011	Golden Horse Awards	Let the Bullets Fly	Best Supporting Actress	Nominated
2012	Asian Film Award	Let the Bullets Fly	Best Supporting Actress	Nominated
2012	Asian Film Critics Association Awards	Let the Bullets Fly	Best Supporting Actress	Nominated
2012	Hong Kong Film Award	Let the Bullets Fly	Best Supporting Actress	Nominated
2013	Osaka Asian Film Festival	Bends	Best Actress	Won
2013	Hong Kong Film Award	Young Detective Dee: Rise of the Sea Dragon	Best Supporting Actress	Nominated
