= Tony Leung Chiu-wai =

Hong Kong actor (born 1962)

- 梁朝偉
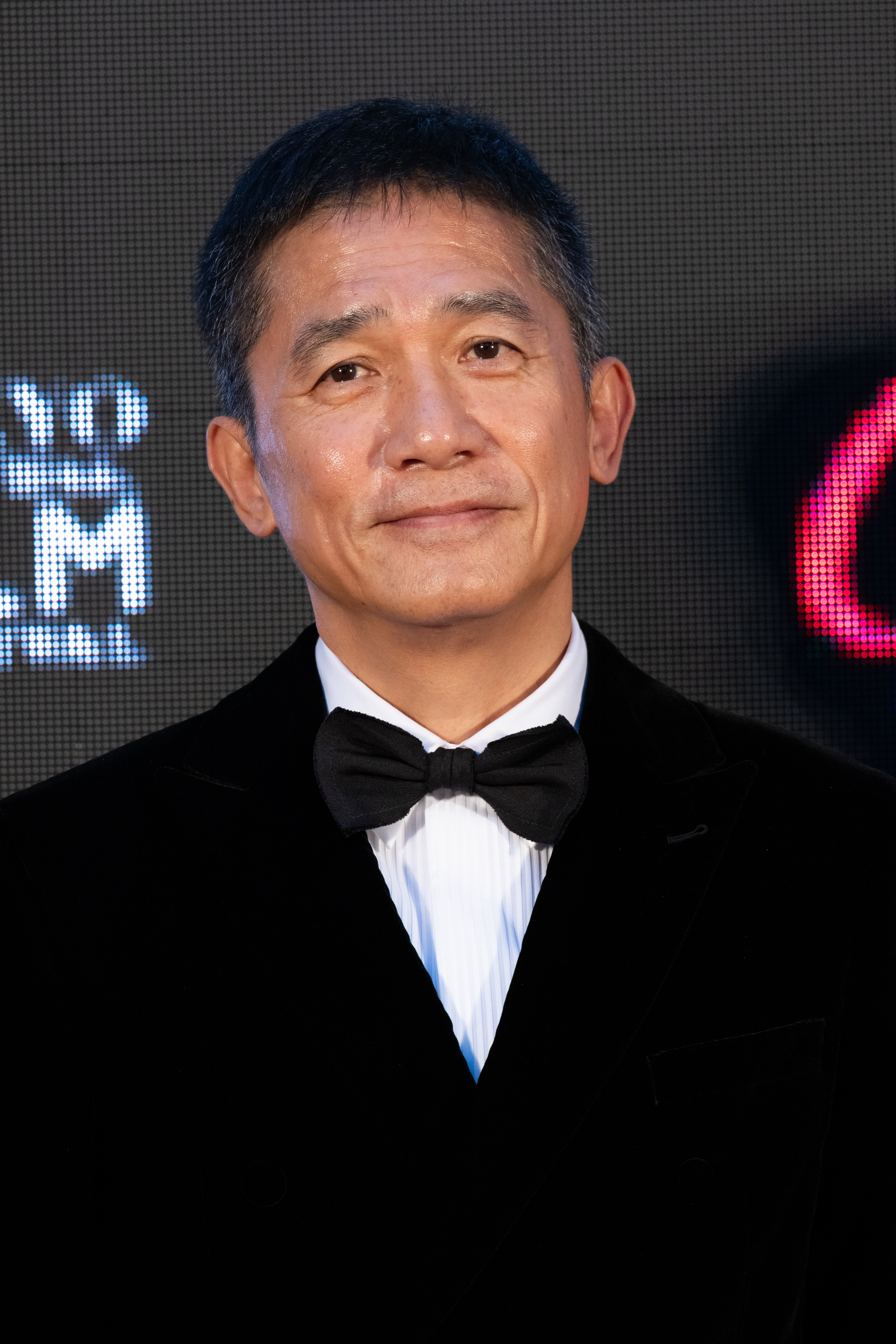
- Leung at the 2024 Tokyo International Film Festival
- Born: 27 June 1962 (age 64); Hong Kong
- Occupations: Actor; singer
- Years active: 1982–present
- Spouse: Carina Lau (m. 2008)
- Awards: Full list
- Honours: Hong Kong University of Science and Technology (Honoris Causa)
- Musical career
- Labels: Capital Artists Music Limited (1985–1992); Music Impact Entertainment Ltd (1994–1997); Universal Music (Hong Kong) Limited (2000–2002); Jet Tone Film Production

Chinese name
- Traditional Chinese: 梁朝偉
- Simplified Chinese: 梁朝伟
Transcriptions
Standard Mandarin
- Hanyu Pinyin: Liáng Cháowěi
Yue: Cantonese
- Yale Romanization: Lèuhng Chìuhwáih
- Jyutping: Loeng4 Ciu4wai5
- IPA: [lœŋ˩ tsʰiw˩.wɐj˩˧]

Signature
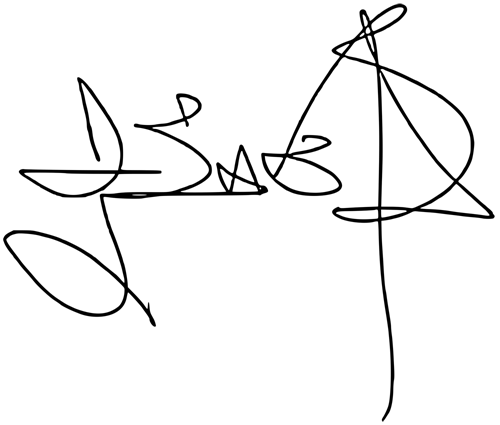

Tony Leung Chiu-wai (Chinese: 梁朝偉; Jyutping: Loeng4 Ciu4wai5, born 27 June 1962) is a Hong Kong actor and singer. Widely regarded as one of Asia's most successful and internationally recognized actors, he has won many international acting prizes, including the Cannes Film Festival award for Best Actor. He was named by CNN as one of "Asia's 25 Greatest Actors of All Time".

Leung is known for his collaborations with director Wong Kar-wai, with whom he has worked in seven films, including Chungking Express (1994), Happy Together (1997), In the Mood for Love (2000), 2046 (2004), and The Grandmaster (2013). He also appeared in three Venice Film Festival Golden Lion-winning films: A City of Sadness (1989), Cyclo (1995) and Lust, Caution (2007), directed by Ang Lee. Leung also starred in the Academy Award-nominated film Hero (2002), the cult classic Hard Boiled (1992), and box office hits Infernal Affairs (2002) and Red Cliff (2008). He later gained wider recognition in Hollywood with his role in Shang-Chi and the Legend of the Ten Rings (2021).

Leung has an extensive list of awards that he has won in a career that began in the 1980s. For In the Mood for Love, Leung earned the Best Actor award at the Cannes Film Festival. He is also an eight-time winner at the Hong Kong Film Awards and three-time winner at the Golden Horse Film Awards, holding the record for most awards in the Best Actor category. The 2002 book East Asian Film Stars describes Leung as "undoubtedly one of the most successful and widely-acclaimed Hong Kong actors of his generation, with a broad and diverse filmography." In 2023, he became the first male actor to win the "Grand Slam", after winning Best Actor at the three most prestigious Chinese-language film awards: the Golden Horse Awards, the Hong Kong Film Awards and the Golden Rooster Awards.

== Early life ==
Leung was born in Hong Kong during British colonial rule to a family of Taishan, Guangdong ancestry. His early childhood was punctuated by his parents' quarrels and arguments about money. A mischievous boy in his early years, Leung changed after his father, a chronic gambler, left the family when he was eight; he and his younger sister were brought up by their mother.

Leung was a slightly reticent, quiet child. He has said that his childhood experiences paved the way for his acting career, which allows him to openly express his feelings:

You don't know what happened, just one day your pop disappears. And from that day on I try not to communicate with anyone. I'm so afraid to talk to my classmates, afraid that if someone says something about family I won't know what to do. So I became very isolated. So that's why I love acting, because I can express all my feelings the way I couldn't for so long. I'm a quiet person. And then when I went to TV it all came out; I cried and I wasn't ashamed. The audience thinks it's the character's feelings, but really it's my feelings, all coming out in a rush.

Leung went to Delia Memorial School, but quit in 1977 at the age of 15 due to financial difficulties so he didn't finish any school or college. He was very close to his mother. During an interview on the making of Hero, he said that he saw his mother as his definition of a hero for having brought up two children alone.

== Television career ==
After quitting his studies, Leung worked in a variety of jobs, first as a grocer's runner at his uncle's shop, then a home appliance salesman in a Hong Kong shopping centre. Around the age of 16, he met future actor and comedian Stephen Chow, who influenced his decision to become an actor and remains a good friend.

In 1982, he graduated from television channel TVB's acting class. Due to his boyish looks, TVB initially cast him as the host of a children's programme, 430 Space Shuttle, but soon moved him to drama roles, beginning with Soldier of Fortune (1982). He was quickly promoted to leading man status in primetime series, including The Duke of Mount Deer (1984) and New Heavenly Sword and Dragon Sabre (1986). Leung mostly enjoyed comedies during his television years; it was for these he became well known. In the 1980s, he was named one of "TVB's Five Tigers" (their five popular young leading actors), along with Andy Lau, Felix Wong, Michael Miu and Kent Tong.

Leung starred in the popular Police Cadet TV serial in 1984 (later named Police Cadet 84 to distinguish it from its two sequels). The series had an average viewership rating of 50% per episode during its original run. Leung played an outgoing young man who decides to become a police officer; Maggie Cheung, whose career started at the same time, played Leung's upstairs neighbour and love interest. Since then they have worked together on The Yang's Saga (1985), Days of Being Wild (1991), The Eagle Shooting Heroes (1993), Ashes of Time (1994), In the Mood for Love (2000), Hero (2002), and 2046 (2005). Leung has said that he considers Cheung his alter ego, and that "Maggie is a truly formidable partner—one to waltz with. We do not spend a lot of time with each other, as we like to keep some mystery between us. Whenever I see her, I discover something new about her".

After eight years with TVB, Leung left the network to focus on his film career. His final TV drama was Ode to Gallantry in 1989.

== Film career ==
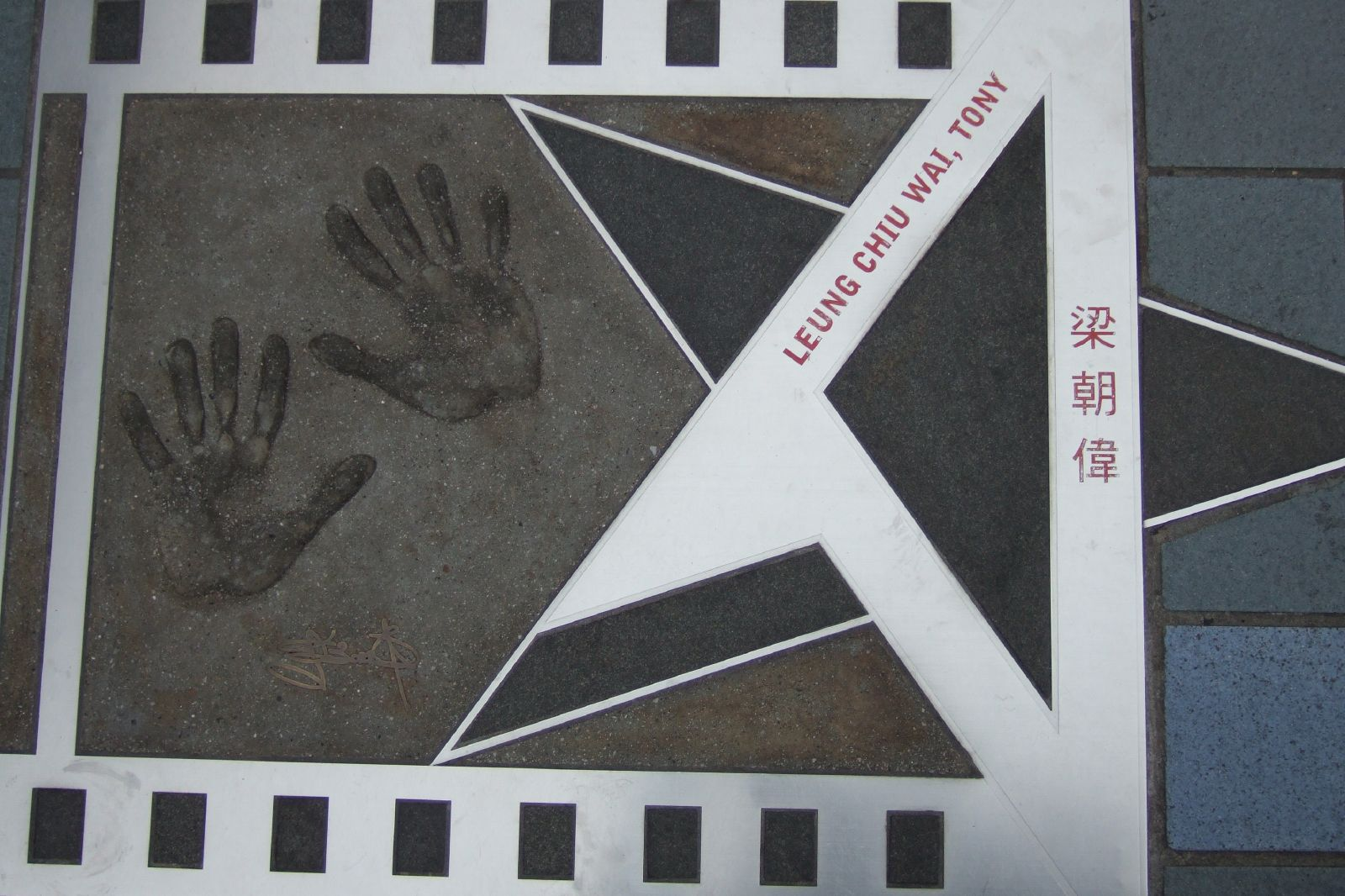
Leung's hand print and autograph at the Avenue of Stars in Hong Kong

Many consider Leung to be the most acclaimed contemporary actor in Greater China. He first garnered international attention in Hou Hsiao-hsien's 1989 film A City of Sadness, which won the Venice Golden Lion. Before that he was already known in Hong Kong for his TV shows and films in the mid-1980s.

Leung's initial transition from television to film in the late '80s and early '90s is considered a low period in his career. He had won two HKFA Best Supporting Actor awards in quick succession but was struggling to establish himself as a leading man on the big screen. In 1992, when he was nominated for a third time in the Supporting Actor category for Hard Boiled, Leung refused the nomination on the grounds that he had a leading role in the film. His protest was supported by director John Woo and co-star Chow Yun-fat. This later led the Hong Kong Film Awards to change its nomination rules to allow for multiple leading roles from the same film. Leung has also said that until Days of Being Wild (1990), he had lost interest in acting and considered quitting, but working with Wong Kar-wai and seeing his scene in the final film changed his mind. His career entered a new chapter when he won dual Best Actor awards at the Golden Horse Awards and Hong Kong Film Awards for Chungking Express (1994), becoming only the second actor to do so after Danny Lee in 1984. He repeated the feat with Infernal Affairs in 2003. Beginning with Chungking Express, Leung has picked up six Best Actor wins at the Hong Kong Film Awards, three Best Actor awards at the Golden Horse Awards, as well as a Best Actor prize at Cannes. In 2023, with his win of the Golden Rooster Award for Best Actor for Hidden Blade, he also became the first person to receive the Best Actor award from all three major Chinese movie awards.

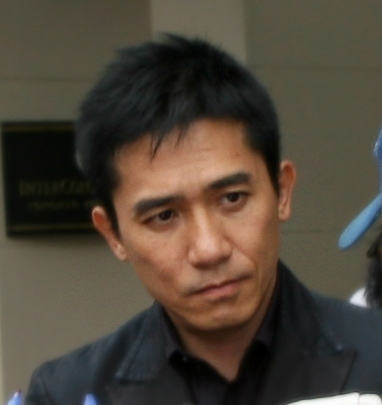
Leung at the 2007 Toronto International Film Festival

Leung often collaborates with Wong Kar-wai and has appeared in many of his films. His roles include the lonely policeman in Chungking Express (1994), a gay Chinese expatriate living in Argentina in Happy Together (1997), and a self-controlled victim of adultery in In the Mood for Love (2000), for which he won the Best Actor award at Cannes. He reprised his role from In the Mood for Love as a new Chow Mo-wan in 2046 (2004) and trained in Wing Chun for five years to prepare for his role as Ip Man in Wong's The Grandmaster. Wong's Jet Tone Film Production was also Leung's management agency for many years until 2018.

In addition to his works with Wong, Leung has starred in three Venice Golden Lion winning films: A City of Sadness (1989), Cyclo (1995) and Lust, Caution (2007), cementing his reputation in the arthouse cinema world. He also became the first Chinese actor to receive the Golden Lion for Lifetime Achievement at the Venice Film Festival. In 2014, he was a member of the jury of the 64th Berlin International Film Festival, and in 2017 he was invited to become a member of the Academy of Motion Picture Arts and Sciences. In 2022, Leung was named the Asian Filmmaker of the Year at the 27th Busan International Film Festival. Robert De Niro and Brad Pitt are admirers of his work, and The Times has called Leung Asia's answer to Clark Gable. He has also been compared to Cary Grant, or a combination of several A-list Hollywood stars.

Leung is widely believed to be a method actor. He has said that he often has trouble separating the characters from himself, beginning with his early TV roles. He usually takes long breaks after filming to recover from psychologically taxing roles, and remnants of the characters still remain within him years later. He has said that the voice of his wife Carina Lau can bring him back to reality.

Leung admits that he has a tendency to stay in his comfort zone and work with familiar teams and filmmakers. Over the course of his career, he has worked with Wong Kar-wai eight times (including See You Tomorrow, which Wong wrote), three times with John Woo, three times with Derek Yee, and twice with Hou Hsiao-hsien. He has also worked with the creators of Infernal Affairs (Andrew Lau, Alan Mak, Felix Chong) on three other films: Confession of Pain (2006), The Silent War (2012), and The Goldfinger (2023). In recent years, Leung has become more adventurous and willing to try new things; this includes collaborating with new directors and taking on his first Hollywood role.

In an interview with Senses of Cinema in 2001, Leung said that he had no plans to make a Hollywood debut, but would consider it for the right project. He said, "I have many more choices on the character I can play (in Hong Kong). The role for Asian actors and actresses is very restrictive in Hollywood movies." Actors such as Chow Yun-fat and Jet Li had then made their own debuts in the 1990s. In 2005, he signed with an American agent with the intention to appear in a Hollywood film. Producer Kevin Feige announced at the 2019 San Diego Comic-Con that Leung will join the Marvel Cinematic Universe as the villain in Shang-Chi and the Legend of the Ten Rings, marking his Hollywood debut. Leung's character Wenwu is a composite character of Fu Manchu and the Mandarin. The movie was released in 2021 and his performance was universally praised.

Leung also had a successful Cantopop and Mandarin pop singing career in the 1990s, which he abandoned to focus on acting. He still occasionally sings for his films; the theme song of Infernal Affairs which he performed with Andy Lau is one of the Top 10 Song of 2003 and won the 22nd Hong Kong Film Awards' Best Original Film Song.

During the promotion of the film Hero, some commentators in Hong Kong alleged that Leung expressed the view that the Tiananmen Square demonstration crackdown was necessary to maintain stability. Leung made a single comment in response that he may have been misquoted and his statement taken out of context.

Leung speaks Cantonese, English and Mandarin. Lust, Caution (2007) is the first film where he used his own voice in a Mandarin-speaking role (his dialogue in Hero is dubbed) and Shang-Chi and the Legend of the Ten Rings (2021) is his first English-speaking role, despite being fluent in the language.

In 2023, Leung starred in the World War II spy thriller Hidden Blade, directed by Cheng Er, and the crime drama The Goldfinger, along with Andy Lau. The Goldfinger is the duo's first collaboration since Infernal Affairs III in 2003. He also made a cameo appearance in the music video for NewJeans's "Cool With You".

After making his first European film, Silent Friend, with Hungarian filmmaker Ildikó Enyedi, Leung plans to make a return to television after almost 40 years, with a miniseries currently in production.

== Personal life ==
=== Relationships ===
Leung publicly dated fellow TVB actress Margie Tsang in an on-again, off-again relationship from 1982 to 1988. In 1986, during one of their breakups, Leung briefly dated Kitty Lai, his co-star at the time in New Heavenly Sword and Dragon Sabre, before getting back together with Tsang. Leung and Tsang broke up permanently in 1988 and he has been in a relationship with Carina Lau since 1989.

==== Marriage ====
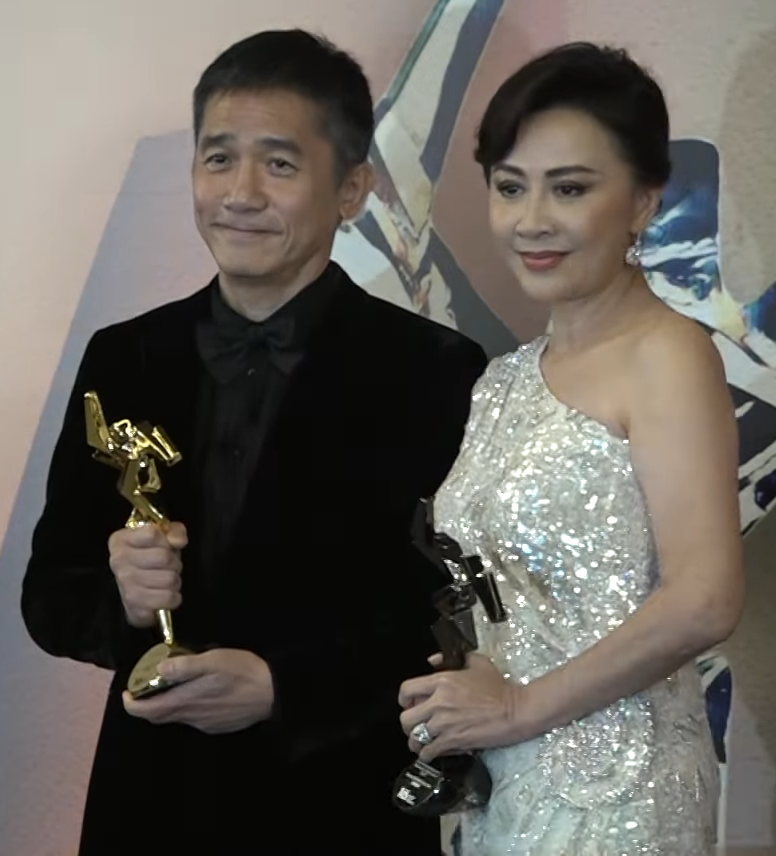
Leung is married to actress Carina Lau (pictured in 2023)

Leung and Carina Lau are one of Hong Kong's most prominent celebrity couples. They began their romantic relationship in 1989 after working together on a Hong Kong production of Run For Your Wife and dated for 19 years before marrying in Bhutan in 2008. They had known each other since The Clones in 1984, and also co-starred together in Duke of Mount Deer (1984), Police Cadet (1984, 1985, 1988), The Yangs' Saga (1985), Days of Being Wild (1991), He Ain't Heavy, He's My Father (1993), Ashes of Time (1994), and 2046 (2005).

In 1990, during the filming of Days of Being Wild, Lau was abducted for several hours. Leung dropped out of the film to spend more time with her. Wong Kar-wai said, "Originally, there were plans for Days of Being Wild I and II, and the sequence featuring Leung was meant to be the opening scene of the second movie. But two things happened, one of which was that Days of Being Wild didn't do well in Hong Kong, so the producers said, 'No Part 2.' The other reason was Lau's kidnapping."

On 21 July 2008, the couple married in Bhutan. The wedding ceremony was directed by Wong Kar-wai and attended by numerous celebrities including Faye Wong, Li Yapeng, Brigitte Lin, Cecilia Yip, Ti Lung and Chang Chen. The event gained significant media attention in Hong Kong, with media companies spending hundreds of thousands of dollars to cover the wedding party.

According to Ming Pao Daily News, Faye Wong and Li Yapeng had taken the couple to India in 2007 to visit the 17th Karmapa. The Karmapa's counsel helped them resolve a crisis in their relationship, and he also suggested Bhutan as a wedding venue.

=== Religion ===
Leung is a Buddhist. He has donated to constructions of Buddhist institutions, performed his marriage in a Buddhist ceremony, attends Buddhist gatherings, and had been seen doing Buddhist palm greetings. He appeared pro bono in the Bhutanese Buddhist film Hema Hema: Sing Me a Song While I Wait (2016). In 2016, he was seen at a ceremony in India that was also attended by members of the Tibetan government-in-exile, which upset Chinese officials.

== Filmography ==
=== Film ===
Year	Title	Role	Notes
1983	Mad, Mad 83		
1985	Young Cops	Leung Siu-bo	
1985	Fascinating Affairs		
1986	The Lunatics	Doggie	
1986	Love Unto Waste	Tony Cheung	
1987	Happy Go Lucky	Wei	
1987	People's Hero	Sai	
1988	I Love Maria	Chong Chi-keung	
1989	My Heart is that Eternal Rose	Cheung	
1989	Seven Warriors	Wong Wai-mo	
1989	A City of Sadness	Wen Ching	
1990	Bullet in the Head	Ben / Ah B	
1990	Days of Being Wild	Gambler	Uncredited
1991	The Royal Scoundrel	Beach boy	
1991	Don't Fool Me	Chiang Ho-chie	
1991	Fantasy Romance	Stupid Shing	
1991	Great Pretenders	Snake Wai	
1991	The Tigers	Tau-pi	
1991	A Chinese Ghost Story III	Little Monk Sap-fong	
1991	The Banquet	Wai Jai	
1992	Hard Boiled	Alan Kong Leung	
1992	Three Summers	Wai	
1992	Lucky Encounter	Wai	
1992	The Days of Being Dumb	Fei	
1993	Butterfly and Sword	Mang Sing-wan	
1993	The Eagle Shooting Heroes	Au-yeung Fung	
1993	Tom, Dick and Hairy	Chan Dai-man	
1993	Come Fly the Dragon	Lau Ka-lun	
1993	Hero – Beyond the Boundary of Time	Wai Siu-bo	
1993	The Magic Crane	Ma Kwan-mo	
1993	End of the Road	Fan Lung	
1993	Two of a Kind	Lam Dai-chi	
1993	He Ain't Heavy, He's My Father	Chor Yuen	
1994	Always Be the Winners	Third Master Sha	
1994	Chungking Express	Cop 633	
1994	The Returning	Chung	
1994	Ashes of Time	Blind Swordsman (Note: Ashes of Time Redux re-scored in 2008)	
1995	Mack the Knife	Doctor Mack Lau	
1995	Heaven Can't Wait	Wong Dai-fung	
1995	Cyclo	Poet	
1996	Blind Romance	Wing	
1996	War of the Underworld	Hung Fei	
1997	Happy Together	Lai Yiu-fai	
1997	97 Aces Go Places	Cui Qiang	
1997	Chinese Midnight Express	Ching On	
1998	The Longest Nite	Inspector Sam	
1998	Timeless Romance	Lau Yat-lo	
1998	Flowers of Shanghai	Wang Liansheng	
1998	Your Place or Mine!	Cheung Suk-wai	
1999	Gorgeous	Albert	
2000	Tokyo Raiders	Lam Kwai-yan	
2000	In the Mood for Love	Chow Mo-wan	
2000	Healing Hearts	Lawrence	
2001	Fighting for Love	Tung Choi	
2001	Love Me, Love My Money	Richard "Bastard" Ma	
2002	Chinese Odyssey 2002	Li Yilong	
2002	Infernal Affairs	Chan Wing-yan	
2002	Hero	Broken Sword	
2003	My Lucky Star	Lai Liu-po / Lai Ma-bo	
2003	Infernal Affairs III	Chan Wing-yan	
2003	Sound of Colors	Ho Yuk-ming	
2004	Super Model	Himself	Cameo
2004	2046	Chow Mo-wan	
2005	Seoul Raiders	Lam Kwai-yan	
2006	Confession of Pain	Detective Lau Ching-hei	
2007	Lust, Caution	Mr. Yee	
2008	Red Cliff: Part 1	Zhou Yu	
2009	Red Cliff: Part 2	Zhou Yu	
2011	The Great Magician	Chang Hsien	
2012	The Silent War	He Bing	
2013	The Grandmaster	Ip Man	
2016	Hema Hema	Deer / Serene Mask	
2016	See You Tomorrow	Chen Mo	
2018	Monster Hunt 2	Tu Sigu	
2018	Europe Raiders	Lam Kwai-yan	
2021	Shang-Chi and the Legend of the Ten Rings	Xu Wenwu / The Mandarin	Hollywood debut
2022	Where the Wind Blows	Nam Kong	
2023	Hidden Blade	Mr. He	
2023	The Goldfinger	Ching Yat-yin	
2025	Fox Hunt	Dai Yichen	
2025	Silent Friend	Tony Wong	

=== Television ===
Year	Title	Role	Notes
1981	The Young Heroes of Shaolin	Shaolin monk	
1982	Demi-Gods and Semi-Devils	monk, episode 44	
1982	The Legend of Master So	waiter	
1982	Manager & Messenger	general manager	
1982	Hong Kong '82		
1982	Wut Lik Sap Yat	Hung Kwok-choi	
1982	Soldier of Fortune	Ying Chi-him	
1982	The Emissary	brother	
1983	The Superpower	Kwok Hak-chung	
1983	Beyond the Rose Garden	Tin-yau	
1983	Encounter with Fortune		
1983	Angels and Devils	Kong Ho-man	
1984	The Clones	Cheung Ka-wai / Chiang Ka-wai	
1984	The Duke of Mount Deer	Wai Siu-bo	
1984	It's a Long Way Home	Yau Ga-kei	
1984	Police Cadet '84	Cheung Wai-kit	
1984	No Regrets for Our Youth	Frankie	
1985	The Rough Ride	Chow Kim-hung	
1985	Police Cadet '85	Cheung Wai-kit	
1985	The Yang's Saga	Yeung Yin-chi (Yeung Chat-long) / Duke of Thunder	
1986	New Heavenly Sword and Dragon Sabre	Cheung Mo-kei	
1987	The Grand Canal	Cheung Sam-long	
1988	Police Cadet '88	Cheung wai-kit	
1988	Behind Silk Curtains	Lin Kar-yip	
1988	Everybody's Somebody's Favourite		
1988	Two Most Honorable Knights	"Little Fishie" Kong Siu-yu	
1989	Ode to Gallantry	Shek Po-tin / Shek Chung-yuk	

=== Music video appearances ===
Year	Title	Artist	Ref.
2002	The Name	The Name	
2023	Cool with You	NewJeans	

== Discography ==
Year	Chinese name	Translation	Language
1985	朦朧夜雨裡	Raining Night	Cantonese
1988	誰願	Who Wants	Cantonese
1993	一天一點愛戀	A Little Love Each Day	Mandarin
1993	難以忘記的你	Hard to Forget You	Cantonese
1994	一生一心	One Life One Heart	Cantonese
1994	為情所困	Trapped by Love	Mandarin
1994	日&夜	Day & Night	Cantonese
1995	從前...以後	The Past ... The Future	Cantonese
1995	錯在多情	The Fault Is Too Much Love	Mandarin
1996	難以忘記 情歌精選	Cannot Forget Collection	Mandarin & Cantonese
2000	梁朝偉精選	Tony Leung Greatest Hits	Mandarin & Cantonese
2000	梁朝偉眼中的花樣年華	Tony Leung's In the Mood for Love	Mandarin
2002	風沙	Wind Sand	Mandarin & Cantonese
2007	絕對收藏	Absolute Collection	Mandarin & Cantonese

== Accolades ==
Year	Award	Category	Nominated work	Result
1987	Hong Kong Film Awards	Best Actor	Love Unto Waste	Nominated
1988	Hong Kong Film Awards	Best Supporting Actor	People's Hero	Won
1990	Hong Kong Film Awards	Best Supporting Actor	My Heart is that Eternal Rose	Won
1993	Hong Kong Film Awards	Best Supporting Actor	Hard Boiled	Nominated
1993	Jade Solid Gold Best Ten Music Awards	Most Popular Mandarin Song Silver Award	你是如此難以忘記	Won
1994	Golden Horse Film Festival	Best Actor	Chungking Express	Won
1995	Hong Kong Film Awards	Best Actor	Chungking Express	Won
1995	Hong Kong Film Critics Society Awards	Best Actor	Chungking Express	Nominated
1996	Golden Bauhinia Awards	Best Actor	Mack the Knife	Nominated
1998	Hong Kong Film Awards	Best Actor	Happy Together	Won
1998	Golden Bauhinia Awards	Best Actor	Happy Together	Won
1998	Golden Horse Film Festival	Best Actor	Your Place or Mine!	Nominated
1999	Hong Kong Film Awards	Best Actor	The Longest Nite	Nominated
2000	Cannes Film Festival	Best Actor	In the Mood for Love	Won
2000	Golden Horse Film Festival	Best Actor	In the Mood for Love	Nominated
2000	Jade Solid Gold Best Ten Music Awards	Most Popular Mandarin Song Silver Award	In the Mood for Love	Won
2001	Chinese Film Media Awards	Best Actor	In the Mood for Love	Won
2001	Hong Kong Film Awards	Best Actor	In the Mood for Love	Won
2001	Golden Bauhinia Awards	Best Actor	In the Mood for Love	Nominated
2001	Hong Kong Film Critics Society Awards	Best Actor	In the Mood for Love	Nominated
2002	Top Chinese Music Awards	Best Film Song	In the Mood for Love	Won
2003	Hong Kong Film Awards	Best Actor	Infernal Affairs	Won
2003	Hong Kong Film Awards	Best Original Film Song (Performed with Andy Lau)	Infernal Affairs	Won
2003	RTHK Top 10 Gold Songs Awards	Top 10 Songs of 2003 (Performed with Andy Lau)	Infernal Affairs	Won
2003	Golden Horse Film Festival	Best Actor	Infernal Affairs	Won
2003	Golden Bauhinia Awards	Best Actor	Infernal Affairs	Won
2004	Chinese Film Media Awards	Best Actor	Sound of Colors	Nominated
2004	Golden Horse Film Festival	Best Actor	2046	Nominated
2004	Tallinn Black Nights Film Festival	Best Actor	2046	Won
2005	Hong Kong Film Awards	Best Actor	2046	Won
2005	Golden Bauhinia Awards	Best Actor	2046	Won
2005	Chinese Film Media Awards	Best Actor	2046	Nominated
2005	Hong Kong Film Critics Society Awards	Best Actor	2046	Won
2007	Hong Kong Film Awards	Best Actor	Confession of Pain	Nominated
2007	Hong Kong Film Critics Society Awards	Best Actor	Confession of Pain	Nominated
2007	Golden Horse Film Festival	Best Actor	Lust, Caution	Won
2008	Iron Elephant Film Awards	Best Actor	Lust, Caution	Won
2008	Asian Film Awards	Best Actor	Lust, Caution	Won
2008	Chinese Film Media Awards	Best Actor	Lust, Caution	Nominated
2008	Independent Spirit Awards	Best Actor	Lust, Caution	Nominated
2008	Hong Kong Society of Cinematographers (HKSC) Awards	Most Charismatic Actor	Tony Leung Chiu-wai	Won
2009	Hong Kong Film Awards	Best Actor	Red Cliff	Nominated
2013	Hong Kong Film Awards	Best Actor	The Silent War	Nominated
2013	Golden Horse Film Festival	Best Actor	The Grandmaster	Nominated
2013	56th Asia Pacific Film Festival	Best Actor	The Grandmaster	Nominated
2014	Hong Kong Film Awards	Best Actor	The Grandmaster	Nominated
2014	Asian Film Awards	Best Actor	The Grandmaster	Nominated
2014	Hong Kong Film Directors' Guild Awards	Best Actor	The Grandmaster	Won
2014	Hong Kong Film Critics Society Awards	Best Actor	The Grandmaster	Nominated
2014	Chinese Film Media Awards	Best Actor	The Grandmaster	Nominated
2018	Chaplin Award Asia	Chaplin Award	Tony Leung Chiu-wai	Won
2021	Utah Film Critics Association Awards	Vice/Martin Award	Shang-Chi and the Legend of the Ten Rings	Won
2022	Seattle Film Critics Society	Best Villain	Shang-Chi and the Legend of the Ten Rings	Nominated
2022	Gold List	Best Supporting Actor	Shang-Chi and the Legend of the Ten Rings	Won
2022	Critics' Choice Super Awards	Best Actor in a Superhero Movie	Shang-Chi and the Legend of the Ten Rings	Nominated
2022	Critics' Choice Super Awards	Best Villain in a Movie	Shang-Chi and the Legend of the Ten Rings	Nominated
2022	Busan International Film Festival	Asian Filmmaker of the Year	Tony Leung Chiu-wai	Won
2023	Asian Film Awards	Best Actor	Where the Wind Blows	Won
2023	Asian Film Awards	Asian Film Contribution Award	Tony Leung Chiu-wai	Won
2023	Venice International Film Festival	Golden Lion for Lifetime Achievement	Tony Leung Chiu-wai	Won
2023	Golden Rooster Awards	Best Actor	Hidden Blade	Won
2023	Macau International Movie Festival	Best Actor	Hidden Blade	Nominated
2024	Asian Film Awards	Best Actor	The Goldfinger	Nominated
2024	Hong Kong Film Critics Society Awards	Best Actor	The Goldfinger	Nominated
2024	Hong Kong Film Directors' Guild Awards	Best Actor	The Goldfinger	Won
2024	Hong Kong Film Awards	Best Actor	The Goldfinger	Won

=== International honours ===
- France:
  - Officier of the National Ordre des Arts et des Lettres (2015)
- Jury president at the 2024 Tokyo International Film Festival for its section 'Main competition'.
