= 鬥魚 =

鬥魚 or 斗鱼, meaning "betta, fighting fish".

It may refer to:

- DouYu, Chinese video live streaming service
- The Outsiders (Taiwanese TV series), 2004 Taiwanese romance and action series
- The Outsiders, 2018 Taiwanese film starring Gingle Wang and Chris Chiu

== See also ==
- Douyu (disambiguation)
- Fighting fish (disambiguation)
- The Outsiders (disambiguation)
