= Final Romance =

2001 Hong Kong film by Alan Mak

- Theatrical release poster
- Traditional Chinese: 願望樹
- Hanyu Pinyin: Yuen mong shu
- Directed by: Alan Mak
- Screenplay by: Chan Kiu-ying; Felix Cheung
- Produced by: Benny Chan; Kyo Sasaki; Peter Tsi
- Starring: Edison Chen; Amanda Strang
- Cinematography: Chan Chi-ying
- Edited by: Cheung Ka-Fai
- Music by: Peter Kam
- Production companies: Fennec Productions; Mandarin Films Distribution; Monster Pictures Entertainment
- Distributed by: Mandarin Films Distribution
- Release date: 28 June 2001; (Hong Kong)
- Running time: 97 minutes
- Country: Hong Kong
- Language: Cantonese
- Box office: HK$762,060

Final Romance (Chinese: 願望樹; pinyin: Yuen mong shu, literally "Wishing Tree") is a 2001 Hong Kong romance film directed by Alan Mak.

== Plot ==
Jean Chuk, daughter of a wealthy Hong Kong family, was asked by her dying sister Michelle to take her ashes to the top of a mountain in Niigata Prefecture to give to Wu, the man she believes rejected her on Valentine's Day. She travels there with Faye, who makes sure that Jean takes her heart medication as prescribed by Dr. Chan. On their way to the ski resort they meet Sena and Dik, mechanics from Hong Kong. At the resort, Dik reveals that he is the brother of Wu and that Wu was in a car accident and, before he died, asked Dik to take his ashes to the same mountain to give to Michelle.

Resort owner Noro presents the wishing tree, which is used for making wedding wishes. Noro then gives Jean 200,000 yen as partial repayment of a 2,000,000-yen loan granted by Michelle. Jean loses her pills on the slopes, so the four must travel to town to get more. While there, Dik reveals that he came to Japan to become a racecar driver. Back at the resort, Noro's son Hira is accidentally left alone on the slopes. Dik and Jean find him and send him on his way back to the resort, but an avalanche traps Dik and Jean on the freezing mountain for the night. Dik uses his jacket to keep Jean warm, causing him to almost die from the cold. After they are rescued, Jean nurses Dik back to health. When he has recovered, they dump the ashes of Michelle and Wu at the wishing tree.

Jean's father Mr. Chuk arrives at the resort and takes Jean back home to Hong Kong. Dik returns to Hong Kong to start over, working in a garage for his brother Wu's old friend Mon-yeung, who organizes illegal street races and underground boxing matches and is involved in protection rackets and loansharking. Jean soon receives a proposal from cardiac surgeon Dr. Peter Chan, her father's preferred choice for her. Dik tries to visit Jean at her father's estate, but is not allowed in the gate. He stays outside in his car, even sleeping there, and is then arrested for fighting Mr. Chuck's men when they try to make him leave.

Dik sneaks into Jean's engagement party and Jean agrees to ride in his car. They are chased by Mr. Chuk's men but Dik easily escapes them with his driving skills. Dik tells Jean that he has moving to Japan to work on a racing team, but Jean needs to go to the United States to have a cardiac operation followed by six months of recovery time. Jean tells her father that she does not wish to marry Peter. Mon-yeung calls and tells Dik that his brother Wu's car crash was not an accident, but rather that his car was pushed off the road by Mr. Chuk's men. Mon-yeung catches Mr. Chuk and attempts to stab him, but Dik jumps between them and is stabbed instead. Jean rushes to his side and collapses, then is rushed to the United States to receive surgery from Dr. Chan. During her six-month recovery period, her father dies from terminal cancer. Jean returns to Hong Kong, where Faye has become a writer living with Sena as her boyfriend. On Valentine's Day she goes to the wishing tree in Japan, where Dik finds her.

== Cast ==
- Edison Chen as Lam Ying Dik
- Amanda Strang as Jean Chuk
- Sam Lee as Sena
- Cindy Au as Faye
- Simon Yam as Mr. Chuk
- Tse Chiu-yan as Noro
- Terence Yin as Mon-yeung
- Raymond Cho as Dr. Peter Chan
- Hui Shiu-hung as Police officer
- Alan Mak as William, pianist
- Cheang Pou-soi as Mak Sir
- Wilson Yip as Kong Sir
- Felix Chong as Mr. Chuck's henchman

== Release ==
The film had a theatrical run in Hong Kong from 28 June to 11 July 2001, earning HK$762,060.

== Reception ==
Reviewer Andrew Saroch of fareastfilms.com gave the film a rating of 3.5 out of 5 stars, writing, "'Final Romance' shows how the director has that noble ability of taking tried-and-tested elements and infusing them with renewed zest. [...] While 'Final Romance' is sign-posted and constructed in the way that nearly every genre film is, Alan Mak has achieved something quite different with this production. What is immediately noticeable is that Mak paces the narrative in a very delicate way, choosing to build the romance between his leads rather than just rely on 'big scenes' to do the work for him. This is especially effective because, even though we are always aware that the two will fall in love, the journey proves to be as satisfying as the destination. Only in the final twists of the last thirty minutes does the pace become a little irregular, but not to a detrimental degree."

Reviewer Kozo of lovehkfilm.com wrote, "Promising director Alan Mak's newest film is a definite change of pace. Final Romance is nothing like his entertaining and stylish A War Named Desire and Rave Fever. No, this is a youth weepie featuring pretty people and manufactured pathos. It's a beautifully produced film, but so devoid of any real weight that it becomes an immediate afterthought."

A review on filmcritics.org.hk reads, "To create such a story for the sake of a market idol is simply to think that the idol can attract the purchasing power of the market. From the appearance to the behavior, language and thinking of Edison Chen in the film, he is not a garage boy at all. Is it because he is afraid that fans and moviegoers will not accept a slovenly, rough and unruly Edison Chen? Is this to cater to a childish audience? As for the character of Amanda (why can't she be given a Chinese name? It's so baffling), the handling and performance are not worth mentioning. When will Hong Kong movies get rid of this childishness?"

Reviewer Ryan Ra of HK Film Blog remarked, "Judging from the cast, it was scheduled for the Hong Kong summer season, but the box office turned out to be as frozen as the setting portrayed in the movie."

Author Gabriel Chong called it one of Alan Mak's "youth-oriented movies", along with Rave Fever (1999) and Stolen Love (2001).
