= Fighting fish =

Fighting fish may refer to:

== Fish ==
- Javanese fighting fish (Betta picta)
- Mekong fighting fish (Betta smaragdina)
- Siamese fighting fish (Betta splendens)
- Betta mahachaiensis
- Penang betta (Betta pugnax)

== Other uses ==
- Fighting Fish, a 2004 film choreographed by Ron Smoorenburg
- "Fighting Fish", a song by Dessa from the 2013 album Parts of Speech
- "Japanese fighting fish", a sketch in the British-Canadian animated television series Planet Sketch
- Siamese Fighting Fish (band) or Siamese, a Danish rock and metal band
- Nickname of the Thai professional Association football club Chachoengsao Hi-Tek F.C.
