= Stolen Love =

Stolen Love may refer to:

- Stolen Love (1928 film), 1928 American silent film
- Stolen Love (2001 film), 2001 Hong Kong film directed by Alan Mak
- Agawin Mo Man Ang Lahat (Stolen Love), 2006 Philippine drama television series
- "Stolen Love", 1952 hit song by Eddy Howard, US No. 11
- "Stolen Love", a song by Paul Haig from the 1983 album Rhythm of Life
- "Stolen Love", a song by Jay Chou from the 2014 album Aiyo, Not Bad
- Stolen Love, 1975 album by Red Clay Ramblers
