= Niu Lai =

2026 Chinese animated film by Xin Yumeng

- Theatrical release poster
- Simplified Chinese: 牛来
- Traditional Chinese: 牛來
- Hanyu Pinyin: Niú Lái
- Directed by: Xin Yumeng
- Written by: Sun Lifang
- Produced by: Xin Yumeng; Sun Lifang
- Starring: Xin Yumeng; Sun Lifang
- Cinematography: Xin Yumeng
- Edited by: Xin Yumeng
- Music by: Sun Lifang
- Animation by: Xin Yumeng
- Production companies: Dalian Jingyuan Culture Film and Television Media
- Distributed by: Tianjin Shanqi Film
- Release date: 5 August 2026
- Running time: 86 minutes
- Country: China
- Language: Mandarin
- Box office: CN¥ 64.29 million

Niu Lai
- Traditional Chinese: 牛來
- Simplified Chinese: 牛来
- Literal meaning: Here Comes the Cow
Transcriptions
Standard Mandarin
- Hanyu Pinyin: Niú Lái
- Bopomofo: ㄋㄧㄡˊ ㄌㄞˊ
- Wade–Giles: Niu^{2} Lai^{2}
- Yale Romanization: Nyóu Lái
- IPA: [njǒʊ lǎɪ]
Wu
- Wugniu: gnieu^{2} le^{2}
- IPA: Shanghainese: [ȵiɤ˨ le˧]
Yue: Cantonese
- Yale Romanization: Ngàuh Lòih
- Jyutping: ngau^{4} loi^{4}
- IPA: [ŋɐw˩ lɔj˩]

Niu Lai (Chinese: 牛来; pinyin: Niú Lái; lit. 'Here Comes the Cow') is a 2026 Chinese animated film directed by Xin Yumeng and written by Sun Lifang. It was produced by Dalian Jingyuan Culture Film and Television Media, formerly an interior design and decoration company, and released by Tianjin Shanqi Film.

While initial box office sales struggled, producing only a few thousand yuan, the film gained sudden notoriety for the quality of its animation. The ridicule it received turned it into a viral phenomenon on Chinese social media, resulting in a sleeper hit which earned over ¥60 million at the box office, becoming one of the most profitable films ever made in terms of gross-to-budget ratio.

== Plot ==
A skylark flies through a dust storm and approaches a herd of cattle. Niu Lai, a calf, struggles to stand up and his mother tells him not to fall asleep. As he struggles, he passes out and has a dream encounter with the nearby skylark. Niu Lai's mother takes the injured skylark with them and it helps her find a drink for Niu Lai's father.

One day, he encounters Bao La, an orphaned leopard, who he befriends and feeds with milk against the opinion of his mother and the herd. A roaming pack of wolves attempts to attack the herd; Bao La distracts them, but the herd takes the decision to migrate, forcing Niu Lai to say farewell to the leopard. The herd faces a difficult crossing of the desert. Although they get a brief respite upon reaching the grassland beyond the desert, it is only short-lived as the wolves have followed the herd. Niu Lai and his mother are saved by Bao La, who also secretly followed them.

They take refuge in a hidden valley with the rest of the herd but once again do not find peace as other wolves prey on the herd. Niu Lai's mother, weakened by all the travels, decides to sacrifice herself to help her son and Bao La get away.

After a flash-forward, Niu Lai and Bao La are now adults and have grown strong enough to confront wolves; Niu Lai leads the herd in place of his father. During a fight with two wolves, they hear a loud noise, which chases the wolves away. They discover it belongs to a man-made machine rampaging through the land. Niu Lai resolves to confront it and sacrifice himself to prevent it from discovering the herd.

As he prepares to fight the machine, he is again transported to a dream encounter with the skylark. As they reflect on their journey, Niu Lai hears a voice telling him to wake up. It is revealed that the whole events were a dream as Niu Lai lay passed out on the ground. The skylark prompts him to stand up, which he finally manages. He runs after the flying skylark, and finds the hidden valley from his dream, where he meets the herd and his father.

== Cast ==
All of the male characters were voiced by Xin Yumeng and all of the female characters were voiced by Sun Lifang.

- Xin Yumeng as:
  - Niu Lai, the main character who grows into a mature ox
  - Niu Lai's father, the leader of the herd
  - Niu Er, a calf the same age as Niu Lai
  - Bao La, a young leopard who is grateful to the herd for being rescued by a cow
- Sun Lifang as:
  - Niu Lai's mother, who teaches and accompanies him as he grows
  - Lark, a lark that witnesses Niu Lai's growth

== Production ==
Niu Lai was directed by Xin Yumeng (信雨萌) and written by Sun Lifang (孙丽芳), a mother-and-son team from Dalian, Liaoning. They were the sole crew members and voice actors of the animation. This was the first film either one worked on and Sun taught herself screenwriting. It took around three to four months for Xin and Sun to refine the characters. Sun wrote the soundtrack and performed the theme song.

Xin and Sun respectively are the legal representative and the financial officer for the production company, Dalian Jingyuan Culture Film and Television Media (大连璟园文化影视传媒有限公司). The company was formed in 2016 as Dalian Jingyuan Decoration Engineering (大连璟园装饰工程有限公司) focusing on interior design and decoration, before changing its business registration to be a media production company in July 2021.

Xin came up with the idea for Niu Lai in 2021, and chose to have the plot revolve around an ox as his father was born during the year of the Ox and 2021 was the year of the Ox as well. Production on the film took five years and cost several thousand yuan. They bought second-hand hardware online as new hardware was too expensive. SketchUp, an architectural modeling program, was used for the animation instead of specialized animation software. He chose to prioritize the story over the quality of the animation as "If we focused all our energy on rendering precision, this film would never have been made."

== Release ==
The public screening license from the China Film Administration was issued on 25 August 2025. No promotional campaign was conducted for Niu Lai, including no trailers. The only advertisement for the film was one poster using traditional ink wash painting. Theater staff did not have proper promotional posters, and some theater staff resorted to hand drawing their own posters for the movie.

Tianjin Shanqi Film was advised against releasing Niu Lai due to its quality, but chose to do so due to it being run by a friend of Xin. It premiered in 245 theaters on 5 August 2026, before being reduced to 4 theaters by 14 August. The number of daily screenings increased from 21 on 14 August to 359 on 15 August. The China Film Shengshi Warner International Cinema in Beijing chose to screen Niu Lai due to a lack of other animated films available.

== Reception ==
=== Box office ===
Niu Lai earned ¥7,169 (US$1,111.47) from 236 people in the first nine days of its release. However, following mass social media mockery, it earned over ¥100,000 in presales, including ¥46,000 on 15 August. It became a sleeper hit, which earned millions of yuan at the box office in the following days. It has grossed ¥64.29 million (US$9,967,441.86) at the box office. It is among the top ten highest-grossing animated films in China in 2026 and one of the highest returns on investment for a film. Tianjin Maoyan Weiying Culture Media estimated that it would earn ¥133–135 million, but lowered its projection to be ¥61.239 million. Its theatrical run was scheduled to end on 4 October.

=== Critical response ===
The film was criticized due to its visual quality. In this shot, the father of Niu Lai (right) comments on the flavor of the milk produced by Niu Lai's mother (left).

FTV News noted that many audience members found a jarring difference between the ink wash painting for the poster and the low quality computer-generated imagery for the film.

Niu Lai has been described as a cult film. The BBC noted that social media users preferred the low-quality but human-made animation over AI art. Animation art director Zhou Shengwei (周圣崴) compared the popularity of Niu Lai to The Rocky Horror Picture Show (1975) and The Room (2003). Film critic Ryan Ra wrote that the unconventional character designs and animation incited laughter among the audience.

Lily Kuo, writing for The New York Times, noted that the plot was baffling and that the animation was compared to a Microsoft PowerPoint presentation. Ed Power, writing for The Daily Telegraph, compared the animation to the music video for "Money for Nothing" by Dire Straits. Film critic Jenni Zylka criticized the dialogue as sluggish and the lip-syncing as off-key, and compared the cow models to the Teletubbies.

The Beijing News criticized Niu Lai for lowering the bar on expectations for poorly made films and called for theaters to stop screening the film. Cui Jingxuan, the director of Citywide Manhunt (全城追缉) (2026), stated that Niu Lai "ripped off the last fig leaf of Chinese cinemas".
