= Daniel Wu =

Hong Kong-American actor (born 1974)

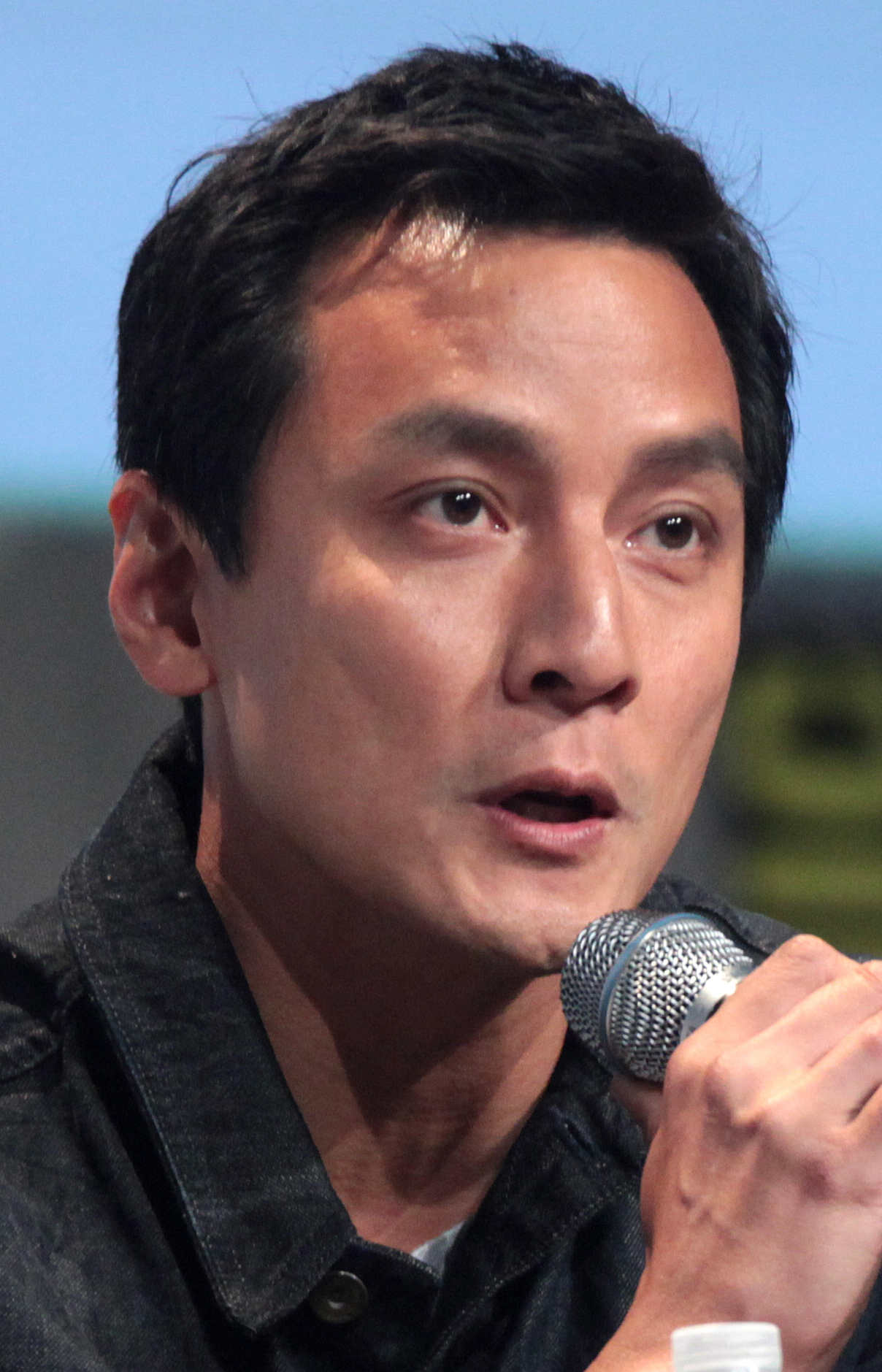
- Wu at the 2015 San Diego Comic-Con
- Born: Daniel N. Wu; September 30, 1974 (age 52); Berkeley, California, U.S.
- Citizenship: United States
- Education: University of Oregon
- Occupations: Actor; Producer; Singer; Martial artist Race car driver
- Years active: 1998–present
- Spouse: Lisa S. (m. 2010)
- Children: 1

Chinese name
- Traditional Chinese: 吳彥祖
- Simplified Chinese: 吴彦祖
Transcriptions
Standard Mandarin
- Hanyu Pinyin: Wú Yànzǔ
- IPA: [ǔ jɛ̂n.tsù]
Yue: Cantonese
- Jyutping: Ng^{4} Jin^{6}-zou^{2}
- IPA: [ŋ jin˨ tsɔw˧˥]

Daniel Neh-Tsu Wu (Chinese: 吳彥祖; born September 30, 1974) is a Hong Kong-American actor and martial artist. He is known as a "flexible and distinctive" leading actor in the Chinese-language film industry. Since his film debut in 1998, he has been featured in over 60 films. A three-time Golden Horse Award nominee, he also starred in the AMC martial arts drama series Into the Badlands and the Disney+ wuxia action comedy American Born Chinese.

== Early life ==
Daniel Wu was born in Berkeley, California, and raised in Orinda, California, and is the third-generation Chinese-American living in the US. Both of his parents' families are originally from Shanghai. During the era of chaos caused by wars, his grandparents took their respective families to Taiwan and Hong Kong and both families immigrated to the United States in the 1950s. Both his parents are highly educated. His mother, Diana Wu (née Liu), is a university professor and holds a doctorate, and his father, George Wu, is an engineer who obtained a master’s degree in Oklahoma. George met Diana in New York when Diana was a student at New York University. After marrying, they settled in California. Wu has two older sisters, Gloria and Greta, and an older brother named Douglas, who died in an accident when he was two.

When he was a child, his grandfather used to take him to watch movies in Chinatown. Wu developed an interest in martial arts when he saw Jet Li in The Shaolin Temple and Donnie Yen in Iron Monkey, and consequently began studying wushu at age 11. His childhood role model was Jackie Chan, who now considers Wu "like a son". Wu attended the Head-Royce School in Oakland, California and later majored in architecture at the University of Oregon. Wu also attended SCI-Arc for a summer program in architecture and worked for architect Michael Rotondi. While in Oregon, he founded the University of Oregon Wushu Club in 1994 and served as the team's first coach. During this time, Wu took film classes and frequented local theaters, and came to enjoy the works of filmmakers like Akira Kurosawa and Luc Besson, whom he describes as "men of vision".

Following graduation, Wu traveled in 1997 to Hong Kong to witness the handover of Hong Kong, with no intention of taking on a film career. At the suggestion by his sister, Wu began modeling. A month later, film director Yonfan, after seeing Wu featured in a clothing ad, approached Wu about starring in an upcoming film. With no acting experience and lacking the ability to speak Chinese, Wu initially turned down director Yonfan. However, persuaded by the director's persistence, he finally took the role and thus embarked on his acting career.

== Career ==
Despite his inability at the time to speak Cantonese or read Chinese, Wu successfully completed his first film, Yonfan's Bishonen in 1998. As of this day, when Wu receives a Cantonese script, his assistant reads the entire piece, while he makes notes on the pronunciation. The day after Bishonen wrapped, Wu was offered the leading role in Mabel Cheung's City of Glass (for which Wu was nominated as best new actor at the 18th Hong Kong Film Awards) and later, a supporting part in Young and Dangerous: The Prequel, from Andrew Lau's gangster film series. Around this time, Wu met Jackie Chan at a restaurant opening and was quickly signed to Chan's JC Group with agent Willie Chan.

Wu's breakthrough performance came in 1999 with his role in Benny Chan's Gen-X Cops. He followed this success with roles in a variety of films including big-budget thriller Purple Storm, arthouse production Peony Pavilion and the successful Love Undercover. In 2001, Wu received criticism from the Hong Kong media for sexual scenes with Suki Kwan in Cop on a Mission, but Wu says that same criticism attracted the attention of directors and the film represented a turning point in the types of roles he chose in the future.

Wu's first experience in film production came with his starring role in Julian Lee's 2003 film Night Corridor. Due to budgetary constraints, Wu participated in the search for funding for and distribution of, the film and recruited Jun Kung to create the soundtrack. Though Night Corridor dealt with "risky" themes, Wu felt he had less reliance on image than many of his pop-star actor peers, and he was nominated for best actor at Taiwan's 40th Golden Horse Film Awards for his effort. During 2003, Wu took part as producer and creative director on MTV's Whatever Things!, a Jackass-styled program aired in Asia, also featuring Sam Lee, Josie Ho, Terence Yin, and other celebrities. During 2003, Wu took part in a stage production of The Happy Prince at the Edward Lam Dance Theater as part of the Hong Kong Arts Festival, during which he recited a 16-minute monologue in Cantonese, learned entirely from pinyin. In 2005, Wu was nominated as best actor at the 24th Hong Kong Film Awards for his role in Derek Yee's One Nite in Mongkok, and as best supporting actor for New Police Story. At the 41st Golden Horse Film Awards, Wu won the award for best supporting actor for New Police Story. The win came as a surprise to him, because he "didn't think that much" of his performance in the film.

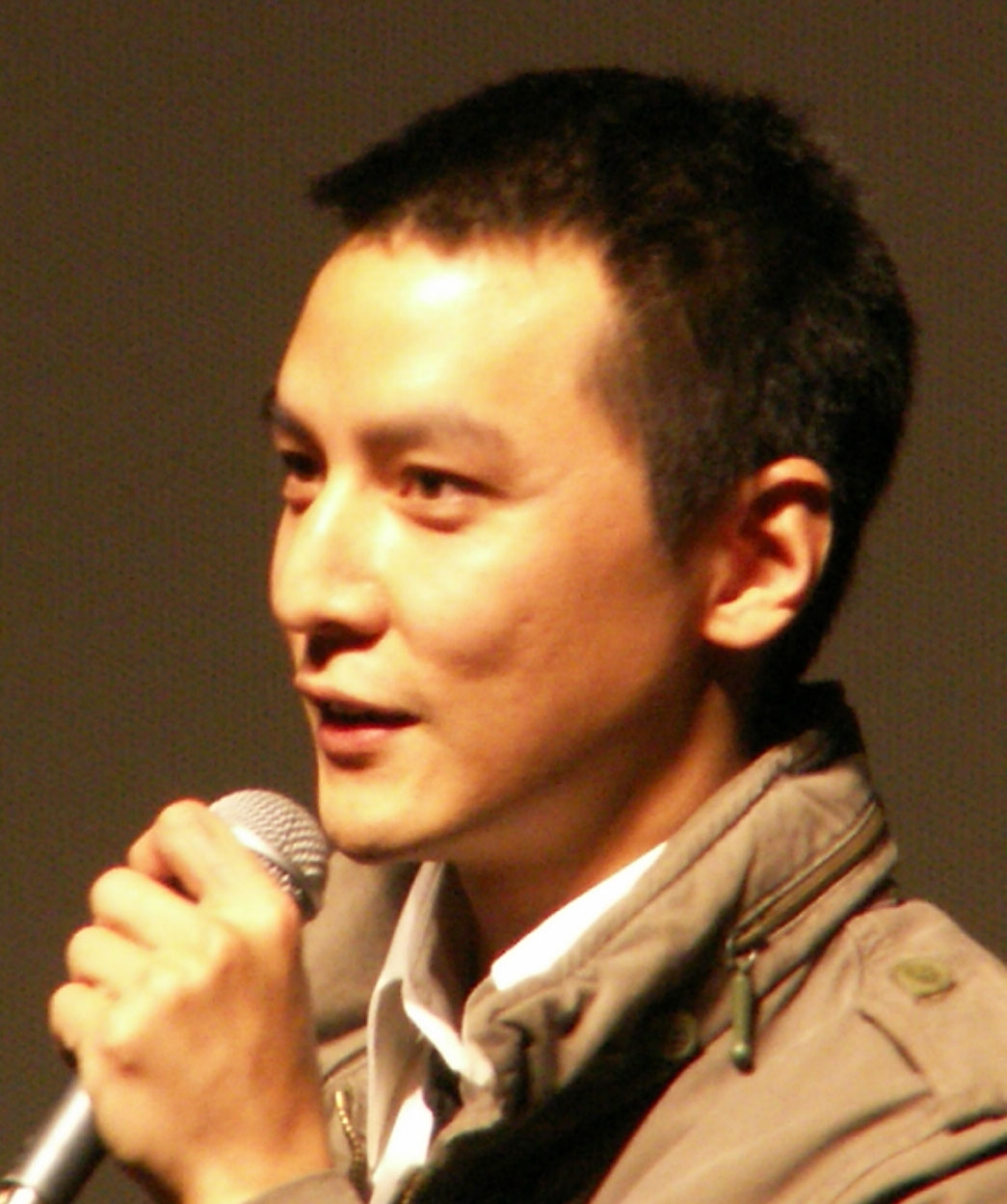
Wu in 2006

In 2005, Chinese media began to report that Wu had formed a boy band, Alive, with Terence Yin, Andrew Lin, and Conroy Chan. Wu and his bandmates posted information, updates, personal thoughts (including slamming Hong Kong Disneyland, for which they were spokespersons), and the band's music, at their official website. In 2006, Wu made his writing and directorial debut with The Heavenly Kings, which chronicles Alive's formation and exploits. After the film's release, however, it was revealed that The Heavenly Kings was actually a mockumentary of the Hong Kong pop music industry, and Alive was constructed purely as a vehicle to make the film; the film's characters represented only 10–15% of their real-life counterparts and much of the footage blurred the line between fiction and reality. Wu admitted his own singing voice "sucked really bad", and the band had their voices digitally enhanced for its music, to prove that "it's easy to fake it". Despite some backlash from the media over being intentionally fed false information in the film about illegal downloads of the band's music, Wu won the best new director award at the 26th Hong Kong Film Awards, an achievement he called "a group effort".

In 2011, Wu starred alongside Kevin Spacey in director Dayyan Eng's bilingual film Inseparable. It premiered at the Busan International Film Festival and was released in cinemas in China and other territories worldwide, making it Wu's first English-language film performance.

From 2015 to 2019, he starred as Sunny on the AMC action series Into the Badlands, for which he also served as executive producer.

In 2016, he portrayed via motion capture and voiced Gul'dan, the central antagonist of the action fantasy film Warcraft, based upon the Warcraft video game series by Blizzard Entertainment. In 2018, he appeared in Tomb Raider, based upon the video game series of the same name, as Lara Croft's sidekick, Captain Lu Ren. In 2021, he appeared in Reminiscence, director Lisa Joy's feature film debut.

== Other ventures ==
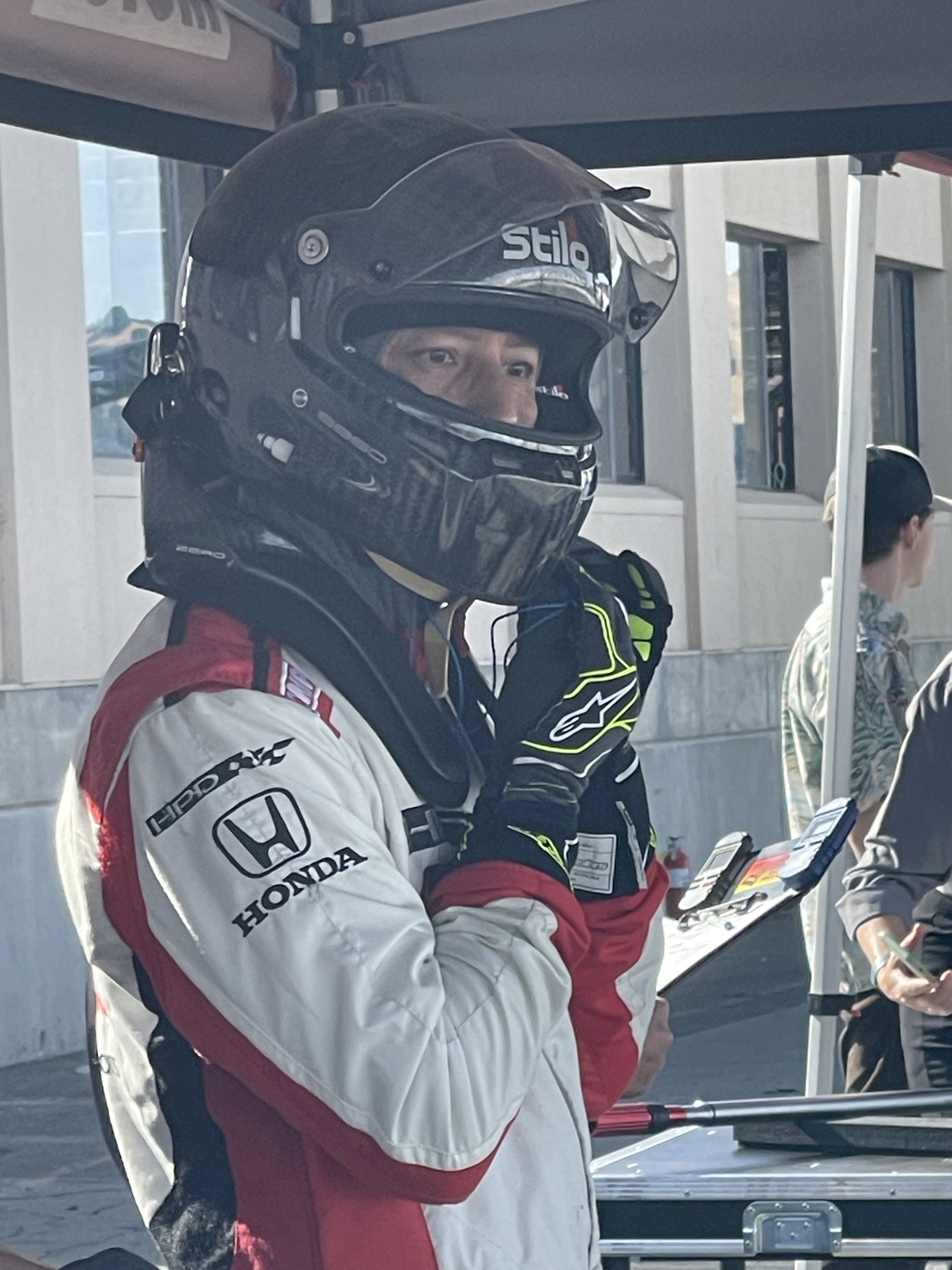
Wu preparing to race at the 2023 Prototype Celebration at Sonoma Raceway.

In April 2007, Wu re-launched his band's old website, AliveNotDead.com, with Terence Yin and RottenTomatoes.com founders Patrick Lee and Stephen Wang, as a place for filmmakers, musicians, and other artists to collaborate, receive exposure, network, and interact with fans. He was a spokesperson for Seiko and L'Oréal. Wu posed for the charity photography album SuperStars by Leslie Kee, and performed on rapper Jin's song "HK Superstar." Wu is an investor in Racks MDB Shanghai, which opened in 2008.

== Personal life ==
Wu maintains residences in Hong Kong, Shanghai, Beijing, and Oakland, California. He continues to train in wushu as well as other martial arts.

On April 6, 2010, Wu married Lisa S. in South Africa. Their daughter was born in May 2013.

Following the passing of his mother due to illness in 2014, he relocated his family from Hong Kong back to California, United States, with the aim of providing care for his elderly father and attending to his daughter's educational needs.

In 2019, Wu denied rumors of supporting Hong Kong independence and has explicitly stated his opposition to it.

== Filmography ==
=== Film ===
Year	English title	Original title	Role	Notes/Ref.
1998	Bishonen	美少年之恋	Sam Fai	
1998	City of Glass	玻璃之城	Daniel	Credited as Daniel Ng
1998	Young and Dangerous: The Prequel	新古惑仔之少年激鬥篇	Big Head	Credited as Daniel Ng
1999	Gorgeous	玻璃樽	Photographer's assistant	
1999	Gen-X Cops	特警新人類	Daniel	
1999	Purple Storm	紫雨風暴	Todd Nguyen	
2000	2000 AD	公元2000	Benny	
2000	Undercover Blues	刑 「殺之法」	Joe Wong	
2001	Headlines	頭號人物	Peter Wong	
2001	Hit Team	重裝警察	Inspector Chung Chai	
2001	Cop on a Mission	知法犯法	Mike	
2001	Born Wild	野獸之瞳	Tide Ho	
2001	Beijing Rocks	北京樂與路	Michael Wu	
2001	Peony Pavilion	遊園驚夢	Xing Zhi-gang	
2002	Beauty and the Breast	豐胸秘Cup	Harper	
2002	Love Undercover	新紮師妹	Au Hoi-man	
2002	Princess D	想飛	Joker	
2002	Devil Face, Angel Heart	變臉迷情	Long	
2002	The Peeping	偷窺無罪	Calvin	
2002	Naked Weapon	赤裸特工	Jack Chen	
2003	Night Corridor	妖夜迴廊	Sam Yuen/Hung	Also producer
2003	Love Undercover 2: Love Mission	新紮師妹2: 美麗任務	Au Hoi-man	
2003	Hidden Track	尋找周杰倫	Police officer	
2003	Miss Du Shi Niang	Miss 杜十娘	Ken Li	
2004	Magic Kitchen	魔幻厨房	Kevin	
2004	Chiseen	黐線		DVD version of some segments of MTV's Whatever Things
2004	Enter the Phoenix	大佬愛美麗	Georgie Hung	
2004	One Nite in Mongkok	旺角黑夜	Lai Fu	
2004	Around the World in 80 Days	—N/a	Bak Mei	
2004	The Twins Effect II	千機變II: 花都大戰	Wei Liao	
2004	Beyond Our Ken	公主復仇記	Ken	
2004	New Police Story	新警察故事	Joe Kwan	
2005	DragonBlade: The Legend of Lang	龍刀奇緣	Hung Lang	Voiceover
2005	House of Fury	精武家庭	Jason	
2005	Divergence	三岔口	Coke	
2005	Drink-Drank-Drunk	千杯不醉	Michael	
2005	Everlasting Regret	長恨歌	Kang Mingxun	
2006	Rob-B-Hood	寶貝計劃	Brokeback Security agent Daniel	
2006	McDull, the Alumni	春田花花同學會	Hostage-taker	
2006	The Banquet	夜宴	Prince Wu Luan	
2006	The Heavenly Kings	四大天王	Daniel Wu	Also writer, director and producer
2007	Protégé	門徒	Nick	
2007	Ming Ming	明明	A D	
2007	Blood Brothers	天堂口	Ah Fung	
2009	Shinjuku Incident	新宿事件	Jie/Joe	
2009	Overheard	竊聽風雲	Max Lam	
2009	Like a Dream	如夢	Max	Also associate producer
2009	Jump	跳出去	Doctor	
2010	Hot Summer Days	全城熱戀	Sushi master	
2010	Triple Tap	鎗王之王	Chong Tze-wai	
2011	Don't Go Breaking My Heart	單身男女	Kevin Fong	
2011	The Founding of a Party	建黨偉業	Hu Shih	
2011	Overheard 2	竊聽風雲2	Joe Szema	
2011	Inseparable	形影不離	Li	
2012	The Great Magician	大魔術師	Captain Tsai	Cameo
2012	Tai Chi 0	太极	Mad Monk	Also producer
2012	Tai Chi Hero	太極2 英雄崛起	Mad Monk	Also producer
2012	The Man with the Iron Fists	—N/a	Poison Dagger	
2012	The Last Supper	王的盛宴	Xiang Yu	
2012	CZ12	十二生肖	Hospital Doctor	Cameo
2013	Europa Report	—N/a	William Xu	
2013	Control	控制	Mark	Also producer
2014	That Demon Within	魔警	Dave Wong	
2014	Overheard 3	竊聽風雲3	Joe	
2014	Don't Go Breaking My Heart 2	單身男女2	Kevin Fong	
2015	I Am Somebody	我是路人甲		Cameo
2015	Go Away Mr. Tumor	滾蛋吧！腫瘤君	Dr. Liang	
2016	Warcraft	—N/a	Gul'dan	
2016	Sky on Fire	沖天火	Zong Tianbao	
2017	Geostorm	—N/a	Cheng Long	
2017	Wished	反轉人生	Daniel Li	Cameo
2018	Tomb Raider	—N/a	Lu Ren	
2020	Caught in Time	除暴	Zhang Sen	
2021	Reminiscence	—N/a	Saint Joe	
2024	Decoded	解密	Xiaolili	
2025	Love Hurts	—N/a	Knuckles Gable	
2026	Cold War 1994	寒戰1994	Peter Choi	

=== Television ===
Year	Title	Role	Notes/Ref.
2015–2019	Into the Badlands	Sunny	Also executive producer
2016	Skylanders Academy	King Pen	Voice
2022	Westworld	Jay	Recurring role (season 4)
2023	American Born Chinese	Sun Wukong "The Monkey King"	Main role
2026	Cyberpunk: Edgerunners 2	Kiril Yang	Voice

== Awards and nominations ==
Year	Award	Category	Nominated work	Result
1998	18th Hong Kong Film Awards	Best New Performer	City of Glass	Nominated
2003	40th Golden Horse Awards	Best Leading Actor	Night Corridor	Nominated
2004	41st Golden Horse Awards	Best Supporting Actor	New Police Story	Won
2005	24th Hong Kong Film Awards	Best Actor	One Nite in Mongkok	Nominated
2005	24th Hong Kong Film Awards	Best Supporting Actor	New Police Story	Nominated
2005	25th Golden Rooster Awards	Best Supporting Actor	New Police Story	Nominated
2005	Golden Bauhinia Awards	Best Actor	One Nite in Mongkok	Nominated
2005	Golden Bauhinia Awards	Best Supporting Actor	New Police Story	Nominated
2007	26th Hong Kong Film Awards	Best New Director	The Heavenly Kings	Won
2007	7th Chinese Film Media Awards	Best New Director	The Heavenly Kings	Won
2007	Hong Kong Film Critics Society Awards	Best Director	The Heavenly Kings	Nominated
2007	Hong Kong Film Critics Society Awards	Best Screenplay	The Heavenly Kings	Nominated
2009	46th Golden Horse Awards	Best Leading Actor	Like A Dream	Nominated
2014	6th Macau International Movie Festival	Best Actor	That Demon Within	Nominated
2015	34th Hong Kong Film Awards	Best Actor	That Demon Within	Nominated
2026	New York Asian Film Festival	Best from the East Award	Defining his presence in Asian cinema whose influence extends across both Eastern and Western screens	Won
