= Night Corridor =

2003 Hong Kong film by Julian Lee

Chinese name
- Traditional Chinese: 妖夜迴廊
- Simplified Chinese: 妖夜回廊
Transcriptions
Standard Mandarin
- Hanyu Pinyin: yāo yè huíláng
Yue: Cantonese
- Jyutping: jiu1 je6 wui4long4
- Directed by: Julian Lee (aka Li Zhichao/Lee Chi Chiu/Julian Lee Chi-Chiu)
- Written by: Julian Lee
- Story by: Julian Lee
- Produced by: Stanley Kwan、Daniel Wu
- Starring: Daniel Wu; Coco Chiang; Kara Wai
- Cinematography: Huang Zhiming、Lin Zhijian
- Edited by: Qiu Zhiwei
- Music by: Jun Kung、Li Zhichao
- Production companies: Pure Light and Shadow Art Agency Co., Ltd.
- Release date: 21 August 2003
- Running time: 73 minutes
- Country: Hong Kong
- Language: Yue Chinese、English

Night Corridor (traditional Chinese: 妖夜迴廊; simplified Chinese: 妖夜回廊) is a 2003 Hong Kong film by Julian Lee Chi-chiu published in the Ming Pao novel Night Corridor adaptation, and personally directed the film. The film stars Daniel Wu and is a Pure Light and Shadow Art Organization production.

== Plot ==
Yuan Sen, an artist studying photography in the UK, is introverted and withdrawn. He lost his father when he was young. His father committed suicide because of his grief and indignation after seeing his mother committing adultery. One day, Yuan Sen had a dream about his younger brother, Ah Hongtuo. In the dream, his younger brother died strangely after being attacked by a claw-like beast. Therefore, Yuan Sen decided to return to Hong Kong to investigate the truth. But the truth became more and more blurred. The mother remarried and became insane. The only clue was a forbidden book left by the dead brother. It brought back memories of him being sexually assaulted by the male principal in the past, how his gay brother Shi Yunsheng controlled him, and how he violated his promise and failed to help his younger brother. Later, Yuan Sen met his old boyfriend Shi Yunsheng again. Shi Yunsheng had become a pop singer. His dead brother's girlfriend, Xiu Bing, even seduced him. Everything seemed to be the summoning of Satan. The seductive and confusing temptation pushed Yuan Sen into the devil's trap step by step.

== Cast ==
- Daniel Wu
- Kara Wai
- Ku Feng
- Eddy Ko
- Allan Wu
- Coco Chiang
- Anthony Fernandez
- Julian Lee

== Production ==
The film was adapted for the screen by Julian Lee Chi-Chiu, from a novel by himself. Lee stated he had drawn inspiration from a painting by Fuseli. It was his second and last film, the director having dying in 2014.

== Awards and nominations ==
Year	Award	Recipient	Result
2003; 40th Golden Horse Awards	Golden Horse Award for Best Leading Actor	Daniel Wu	No

== Reception ==
Variety commented, "The cinematic equivalent of fusion cuisine, gothic tale Night Corridor proves that too many influences spoil the soup." A positive review at EasternKicks found that there was "a real cult classic vibe here".

The film is said to "address directly the issue of homosexuality" and the Routledge International Encyclopedia of Queer Culture commented," Like a number of other independent queer films, this was an official selection of Hong Kong International Film Festival. In the film, Lee portrays a series of exploitative relationships, combining repressed homosexuality, paedophilic abuse, the Oedipus complex and primal cruelty, all brought crashing down upon the head of a gay artist."
