= Gorgeous (film) =

1999 Hong Kong film by Vincent Kok

- Theatrical release poster
- Directed by: Vincent Kok
- Screenplay by: Jackie Chan; Vincent Kok; Lo Yiu-fai
- Story by: Ivy Ho
- Produced by: Jackie Chan
- Starring: Jackie Chan; Shu Qi; Tony Leung; Richie Jen; Emil Chau
- Cinematography: Cheung Man-po
- Edited by: Cheung Ka-fai; Kwong Chi-leung
- Music by: Dennie Wong
- Production company: Golden Harvest
- Distributed by: Golden Harvest; Sony Pictures Releasing (via TriStar Pictures, international releases)
- Release date: 12 February 1999
- Running time: 120 minutes
- Country: Hong Kong
- Languages: Cantonese; Mandarin; Hokkien; English
- Box office: HK$40,545,889

Gorgeous (Chinese: 玻璃樽; Jyutping: bo1 lei4 zeon1; released in the Philippines as High Risk) is a 1999 Hong Kong action romantic comedy film directed and co-written by Vincent Kok, starring Jackie Chan, Shu Qi, Tony Leung, Richie Jen, and Emil Chau. The film performed well at the Hong Kong box office.

== Plot ==
Bu (Shu Qi) is a beautiful young girl from a small Taiwanese fishing village who discovers a romantic message in a bottle. She heads for Hong Kong to find its writer, only to learn that it was in fact written by Albert (Tony Leung Chiu-wai), a lonely gay man. She then meets a wealthy recycling company owner, C.N. (Jackie Chan). They fall in love with each other. The plot is soon thickened by the rivalry between Howie Lo (Emil Chau) and C.N., who are both businessmen who have known each other since their childhood days.

In the English dubbed version, some of the dialogues are changed and a few scenes are edited out. These scenes included one at the airport where Sandra Ng's and Sam Lee's characters conned and robbed Long Yi (Richie Jen) who supposedly is engaged to Bu and another where Stephen Chow's policeman character came to investigate after C.N. fought off Howie Lo's masked goons and Albert's friends who on Bu's request pretended to be gangsters attacking her who in turn is pretending to be the reported missing girlfriend of a Taiwan gangster leader.

== Cast ==
- Jackie Chan as C.N. Chan (T: 陳子午, S: 陈子午, J: can4 zi2 ng5, P: Chén Zǐwǔ)
- Shu Qi as Bu (C: 阿不, J: aa2 bat1, P: Ā-bù)
- Tony Leung as Albert
- Emil Chau as Howie Lo (T: 盧乃華, S: 卢乃华, J: lou4 naai5 faa1, P: Lú Nǎihuá)
- Richie Jen as Long Yi (C: 隆一, J: lung4 jat1, P: Lóngyī)
- Chen Sung-young as Bu's father
- Elaine Jin as Bu's mother
- Bradley James Allan as Alan
- Tats Lau as Lo's assistant
- Vincent Kok as Lo's assistant
- Ken Lo as Lo's assistant
- Kwan Yung as Lo's assistant
- William Tuen as Lo's assistant
- Eric Kot as Man in Pier
- Sandra Ng as thief / Conwoman
- Sam Lee as robber / Frog
- Law Kar-ying as restaurateur
- Stephen Chow as H.K policeman
- Stephen Fung as photographer
- Daniel Wu as photographer's assistant
- Carmen Soo as Gloria
- Jacqueline Li as Michelle
- Siu-wai Cheung as Shelly (as Shelly Zhu)

Featuring cameo appearances Paul Chang, Maggie Cheung Ho-yee, Cheung Tat-ming, Asuka Higuchi, Jo Kuk, Lee Lik-chi, Mark Lui, Edmond So, Kai Man-tin, Ken Wong, Annie Wu, Kitty Yuen, Rocky Lai, Chan Man-ching, Louis Keung and Mars.

== Production ==
Chan had long wanted to be involved in drama films, but had constantly been dissuaded by Leonard Ho, one of the founders of Golden Harvest and Chan's godfather. Ho had argued that to ensure success in his films, Chan should play to his fanbase by only doing action movies and avoiding the love scenes that may alienate certain markets (notably Japan). Ho died on 16 February 1998 and Chan left Golden Harvest soon after, seeking a change and a new freedom to make the films he really wanted to. This coincided with his growing fame in the West, due to the international success of the film Rush Hour.

Gorgeous was originally conceived purely as a love story, with Chan as producer, but not as one of the film's cast. In order to secure the actress Shu Qi, the script of the film was re-written and a role for Chan was created. This soon developed into a starring role, and elements of action crept in. However, Gorgeous remains primarily a romantic comedy and so it differs from his usual all-out action films. The action scenes are fewer and there is no real bad guy character – the fight with the nominal enemy (played by Brad Allan) is a pre-arranged bout and both fighters wear boxing gloves – competitive rather than motivated by revenge or the fight for survival.

The director had wanted to use Chan's office as the set for C.N.'s apartment, but this proved impractical, particularly as that section of the office is on the third floor. However, many props from Chan's office were used including his own training dummy. Chan said of his character C.N., that he was "60-70% Jackie Chan". The clothing the character wears, the training routine he undergoes and healthy lifestyle he maintains, his general good nature and his environmental role are all traits and actions of Chan himself.

Chan summarised the difference between the films Rush Hour and Gorgeous, stating the former was a job, and the latter was his baby. In Rush Hour his role was restricted to actor and action director. In Gorgeous, he was also the producer, editor and was involved in casting.

Although a romantic comedy, the only significant kissing scene was dropped from the main film for fear that it would alienate certain East Asian markets who may not want to see Chan in such a relationship. The underwater kiss scene was retained and appeared amongst the out-takes that accompany the film's closing credits.

The film is notable for casting numerous, then, unknown actors who went on to achieve national and in some cases multi-national success. These include: Sam Lee, Daniel Wu, Richie Jen and Stephen Fung.

== Release ==
Gorgeous was released in Hong Kong on 12 February 1999. In the Philippines, the film was released as High Risk in early September 2002.

=== Box office ===
Gorgeous was a box office success in Hong Kong, grossing HK $40,545,889 during its theatrical run.

=== Awards and nominations ===
Years	Awards	Categories	Nominees	Results
1999	36th Golden Horse Award	Best Action Choreography	Jackie Chan	Nominated
2000	19th Hong Kong Film Awards	Best Action Choreography	Jackie Chan, Jackie Chan Stunt Team	Nominated

== See also ==
- List of Hong Kong films
