= Jaymee Ong =

Australian model and actress (born 1979)

Jaymee Ong (王淑美, born 21 September 1979 in Australia) is an Australian model and actress. She is known for being the co-host of The Contender Asia and was the host of AXN's eBuzz in Singapore.

== Personal life ==
Ong was born and raised in Australia. In her late teens she began her modeling career. Ong married Australian electrical engineer Matthew Heath in 2009 after dating him for three years. They have a daughter born in 2010, and a son born in 2015.

== Film career ==
In 1999, Ong was signed by Jackie Chan to Media Asia in Hong Kong where she started a film career. She starred in her debut film Gen-X Cops. The success of Gen-X Cops was followed by a lead role in Rave Fever, an independent movie that established her as a serious actress.

She went to Hollywood where she had a small part in Pearl Harbor in 2001, but then shifted her acting career to Los Angeles, where she was cast for several guest appearances in U.S. TV series Las Vegas and Entourage.

Based in Singapore since 2004, Ong has co-starred with Thai actor Gof Akara and Sharon Au in Channel 5 drama Tiramisu. She is also a host for AXN, currently hosting and writing for eBuzz, a weekly entertainment magazine programme where she interviews international celebrities.

She also stars in Spa Seekers with her sister Lindsay on TLC.

In 2007 she was chosen as the host for The Contender Asia, a reality programme about Muay Thai that is produced by Mark Burnett Productions.

== Other work ==
She is a World Vision Singapore Goodwill Ambassador, travelling to Phuket, Thailand to learn more about poverty, HIV/AIDS and child prostitution issues. On her return, she participated in various World Vision events to help promote the charity. In December 2007, she was involved in a nationwide campaign for World AIDS Day called "One Life Experience".

She was the host of the global press conference for the Samsung Omnia SGH i-900 smart phone. and was the 2008 Formula 1 Singapore Grand Prix Ambassador.
