= Gen-X Cops =

1999 Hong Kong film by Benny Chan

- Film poster
- Traditional Chinese: 特警新人類
- Simplified Chinese: 特警新人类
- Hanyu Pinyin: Tè jíng xīn rén leì
- Jyutping: Dak6 ging2 san1 jan4 leoi6
- Directed by: Benny Chan
- Screenplay by: Benny Chan; Peter Tsi; Koan Hui; Anna Lee
- Produced by: Benny Chan; John Chong; Solon So
- Starring: Nicholas Tse; Stephen Fung; Sam Lee
- Cinematography: Arthur Wong; Anthony Pun
- Edited by: Cheung Ka-Fai
- Music by: Nathan Wang
- Production company: Media Asia Films
- Distributed by: Media Asia Distribution
- Release date: 18 June 1999
- Running time: 114 minutes
- Country: Hong Kong
- Languages: Cantonese; English; Japanese
- Box office: HK$15,631,989

Gen-X Cops (Chinese: 特警新人類) is a 1999 Hong Kong action comedy film written, produced and directed by Benny Chan. The film stars Nicholas Tse, Stephen Fung and Sam Lee.

South China Morning Post has called the film a "classic example" of "Hong Kong's new-style '90s action films that featured young actors, more special effects...and sub-par scripts". The film went straight to rental release in the United States. It was followed by a sequel called Gen-Y Cops, also directed by Chan.

== Synopsis ==
Jet fuel is stolen by weapons smugglers. The fuel is reacquired by the Hong Kong police but then once again stolen by a yakuza boss named Akatora who is trying to sell it with the help of Hong Kong thug Daniel. Three rebellious cops go undercover to find both the jet fuel and Akatora. They must use the criminal instincts that got them kicked out of the force to save Hong Kong from a devastating terrorist attack.

== Characters ==
=== The Gen-x Cops ===
Jack (played by Nicholas Tse) The main protagonist of the movie. Jack is the tough cool one of the group. He will do almost anything to win.

Match (Played by Stephen Fung) Match is the playboy of the group, as he is always more concerned with the girl instead of the task at hand.

Alien (Played by Sam Lee) As his name suggests, Alien is the goofy guy of the bunch. He does not really like authority or doing much work but does his fair share in the group.

Y2K (Played by Grace Ip) Y2K is the girl of the group. She has skills in fighting and computers. She is mainly the group's techie. She is also the sister of an undercover cop killed, as he is the reason Akatora lost his goods to begin with.

=== The gangsters ===
Akatora (Played by Tôru Nakamura) The main antagonist of the movie. He is the mastermind behind the stealing and smuggling of the jet fuel explosives. He is driven by revenge. He believes that a man named Shimada is the reason his father was killed. And his goal is to eventually avenge his father by killing Shimada.

Daniel (Played by Daniel Wu) is Akatora's man in Hong Kong. He kills his own brother to show his loyalty. Once his girlfriend leaves him for Match, he takes Jack with him and eventually is killed by Akatora for bringing a cop to his hideout.

Lok (Played by Francis Ng) is a very good friend of Dinosaur. Once he hears about his friend's death he comes to Hong Kong to find his killer. Burned to death in the fiery pool (set by Akatora) while saving Jack.

Tooth (Played by Terence Yin) is the right-hand man of Daniel. But he betrays him when Lok puts up $10 million for the identity of the killer of Dinosaur, only to be killed by Daniel later.

Haze (Played by Jaymee Ong) is the current girlfriend of Daniel. But she had a fling with Match in Canada. For her it was much more serious. The only reason she came to Hong Kong with Daniel was to find Match. She leaves Daniel for Match in the end.

=== The Police Force ===
Inspector Chan aka Inspector Smart (played by Eric Tsang) Inspector Chan was the one who recruited the Gen-X Cops. He is often looked down by his colleagues and is considered to be a laughing stock. He dies when Akatora frantically shoots at the Gen-X Cops who escaped by parachuting and takes one of the bullets to the head.

Superintendent To (played by Moses Chan) A slick cop, he is Chan's superior who has always insults and laughs at Chan. He heavily looks down on Chan and the Gen-X Cops and has a strong dislike for them.

Inspector Tang (played by Wayne Lai) A CIB trainer, he was the Gen-X Cops' instructor who kicked them out due to their extremely bad behavior.

=== Cameos ===
There were some cameo appearances in this movie. Among them were Jackie Chan, Brad Allan, Ken Lo, Alan Mak, Kenji Tanigaki, Jaymee Ong, Robert Sparks, Thomas Sin, Keiji Sato, Bruce Khan, Rocky Lai, David John Saunders and Bey Logan.

== Release ==
=== Home media ===
Released on VHS and DVD on 18 April 2000 by Columbia/TriStar Home Video.

== Soundtrack ==
1. You Can't Stop Me (Cantonese) by Nicholas Tse, Stephen Fung and Sam Lee
2. XXXX
3. 非走不可 (Remix) by Nicholas Tse
4. Let Me Bleed by Stephen Fung
5. Can't Stop Me (Mandarin) by Nicholas Tse, Stephen Fung and Sam Lee
6. Terror from Sunrise (Instrumental)
7. The Gen-X Rave (Instrumental)
8. Baptism of Fire (Instrumental)
9. The Final Jump (Instrumental)
10. The Eruption (Instrumental)

== Sequel ==
Stephen Fung and Sam Lee returned for the 2000 sequel titled Gen-Y Cops, which was released as a Sci Fi Channel TV-movie on 23 February 2002 as Jackie Chan Presents: Metal Mayhem. Nicholas Tse did not return for the role of Jack, and Edison Chen filled the open spot with a character named Edison Chan.
