= Ron Smoorenburg =

Dutch martial artist and actor (born 1974)

- Born: 30 April 1974 (age 51); Nieuwegein, Utrecht, Netherlands
- Occupations: Actor; martial artist

Ron Smoorenburg (born 30 April 1974) is a Dutch martial artist and actor, who is best known for his film debut as the high-kicking henchman in the final fight of Jackie Chan's Who Am I? in 1998. He currently lives in Thailand, where he works as an actor, stuntman, and fight choreographer.

== Early life ==
Born in Nieuwegein on 30 April 1974, Smoorenburg began his martial arts training at the age of seven, beginning with Judo and four years later, transitioned to Karate and Free Fighting, a form of Mixed Martial Arts. He admitted he was influenced by the likes of Jackie Chan and Hwang In-Shik as well as Jean-Claude Van Damme. During this time, he was doing demonstrations, some appearing on television and then it was in 1997, live on a local television program, Smoorenburg gained the record for the highest kick of 11 feet.

== Film career ==
When Jackie Chan was filming Who Am I? in Rotterdam in 1997, Smoorenburg auditioned for a role in the film. Impressed with his kicking skills, Chan hired him to play one of two final opponents in which Chan would film the fight on the roof of the Willemswerf Building. It is here where Ron learned how to work in a fight scene for the first time and had some trouble adapting to Chan's trademark rhythmic movements. However, he eventually learned the pacing but for more complicated movements of the fights were doubled by Jackie Chan Stunt Team members Brad Allan, Andy Cheng, and Nicky Li. In 1999, Smoorenburg appeared as a top villain on an episode of the short-lived action series Codename: Puma, taking on the series' lead star, Mickey Hardt, with Donnie Yen serving as action director.

The experience was a good one for Smoorenburg and he would take on a few bit parts in Hong Kong movies. He played a cage fighter in Gen-Y Cops having a short fight scene against Stephen Fung. The two would have a longer rematch with Smoorenburg playing a character resembling Bryan Fury against Fung's Iron Surfer, who resembled Hwoarang in the Tekken-inspired film The Avenging Fist in 2001. Smoorenburg would play another fighter in Born Wild opposite Louis Koo and moved up to play the main villain in Martial Angels opposite Shu Qi.

With learning the ropes in Hong Kong, Smoorenburg returned home to the Netherlands in 2002, where he began to craft his skills as a fight choreographer and actor. He appeared in the 2002 Belgian horror film Engine Trouble for director Marc Ickx and in 2004, co-starred and choreographed Fighting Fish, the Netherlands' first full-length martial arts film, starring Chinese-born Kim Ho-Kim.

In 2005, Smoorenburg went to Thailand to work as a stunt fighter on Tom-Yum-Goong, where he is seen as one of many fighters in a one vs. many fight against Tony Jaa. Ron loved the experience and locales so much that he decided to move there. Since then, Smoorenburg has appeared in both film and television series in Thailand, where he has a chance to showcase his action style. He has become good friends with the likes of Swedish-Chinese born stunt ace Tim Man and French-born stunt ace Brahim Achabbakhe. He can be seen taking on Scott Adkins in Ninja: Shadow of a Tear and teams up with Achabbakhe to take on Kane Kosugi in the sequel Tekken 2: Kazuya's Revenge. In 2016, Smoorenburg had a bit role as a fighter who takes on Michael Jai White in the opening of Never Back Down: No Surrender and will be seen as the heroic Black Knight in Warrior's Gate opposite Dave Bautista. He has also appeared in Bollywood films such as Brothers and Sultan starring Salman Khan.

== Personal life ==
Smoorenburg is married to Thai-born Tik and the couple have a son, Nicky.

== Selected filmography ==
- Who Am I? (1998) - Morgan's Henchman
- Gen-Y Cops (2000) - Cage Fighter
- The Avenging Fist (2001) - Iron Surfer's Opponent
- Martial Angels (2001) - Paracov
- Born Wild (2001) - Boxer
- Engine Trouble (2003) - Marc
- Fighting Fish (2004) - Mark (also fight choreographer)
- Tom-Yum-Goong (2005) - Henchman
- The Bodyguard 2 (2007) - Gang Leader
- Death Note: L Change the World (2008) - Sergeant
- The Fifth Commandment (2009) - Gang Member
- Street Fighter: The Legend of Chun Li (2009) - Balrog's Gang
- Full Love (2010) - Karl (unreleased)
- The Burma Conspiracy (2011) - Mercenary Dragan 1
- Elephant White (2011) - Bodyguard
- Oosaravelli (2011) Thelugu movie - Irfan Bai's Henchman
- The Viral Factor (2012) - Tyler's Henchman
- Billa 2 (2012) Tamil Movie - Russian Henchman
- Lost in Thailand (2012) - The Russian
- Only God Forgives (2012) - Muay Thai Fan
- Vikingdom (2013) - Captain of Jomsberg
- Iddarammayilatho (2013) Thelugu movie - Gang Fighter
- Ninja: Shadow of a Tear (2013) - Dojo Fighter
- Tekken 2: Kazuya's Revenge (2014) - Thorn
- Brothers (2015) Hindi movie - The Hammer
- Time Rush (2015) - Prevara Captain
- Never Back Down: No Surrender (2016) - Case's 1st Opponent
- Baaghi (2016) Hindi Movie - Lon, Fight Club Champion
- Sultan Hindi movie - Ron
- The Warriors Gate (2016) - The Black Knight
- Warrior Savitri (2017) - The Manager
- Thor: Ragnarok (2017) - Asgardian
- Triple Threat (2019) - Steiner
- Meg 2: The Trench (2023) - Mercenary
- Order of the Dragon (2026) - John Rico
