= Devil Face, Angel Heart =

2002 Hong Kong film by Billy Chung

- DVD Cover
- Traditional Chinese: 變臉迷情
- Simplified Chinese: 变脸迷情
- Directed by: Billy Chung
- Produced by: Lee Kwok-Hing
- Starring: Daniel Wu; Stephen Fung; Gigi Lai; Sam Lee; Lam Suet; Kelly Lin
- Distributed by: Mei Ah Film Production Co. Ltd.
- Release date: 9 May 2002
- Running time: 87 minutes
- Country: Hong Kong
- Language: Cantonese

Devil Face, Angel Heart is a 2002 Hong Kong thriller film directed by Billy Chung.

== Plot ==
The movie begins as Long (Daniel Wu), born with a disfigured face, and his brother Kwan work as assassins for the notorious Hong Kong triad leader, "Dinosaur." Dinosaur is involved in drugs, fire arms, prostitution, human trafficking and many more crimes. Every night he is at his mansion, Wendy (Gigi Lai), his girlfriend, must be waiting for him in his bedroom. Dinosaur would sexually torture Wendy in the room. Everytime, Wendy would walk up to Long, bruised up from her boyfriend. Long told her not to look at him because he was afraid that his face will scare her. However, Wendy told him that the man that she sleeps with every night is a hundred times scarier. Wendy also warned Long to leave Dinosaur with his brother when they still have a chance. Long refused but instead, promised Wendy to kill Dinosaur during his business trip to Taiwan. Wendy told them that she will tell her uncle to bring them back to Hong Kong if they succeed.

Two police officers, Kent (Stephen Fung) and Dicky (Sam Lee) received an order to investigate Dragon and his triad, but were attacked by Long and his brother. During the gunshot, Dicky was shot died right in the eye.

Long and his brother follow Dinosaur as he meet his client in a Taiwanese sex club. Dinosaur told his assassins to kill his client when the time is up. Long and his brother prepare in the restroom. When Dinosaur and his client chooses the girls, he ask for the mistress, Mei as well. At first the mistress refused by saying she is too old as an excuse but Dragon grabbed her on the couch. Dragon offered her to give him oral sex in front of the crowd for a few minutes for $1,000,000. Afterward, Dragon was so pleased that he gave her $2,000,000. Mei goes to the restroom the floss her mouth and runs into Long and his brother mounting their pistols. Long shows mercy and lets her live. Meanwhile, Dinosaur and his client had a girl stripped as they groped her and made sexual advances. Suddenly Long and his brother walk in and do the shooting. With the clients died, Dinosaur orders Long and Kwan to give him their pistols. The girls begged for mercy but Dinosaur laughs and shoots them all. Dinosaur then turns and attempts to shoot his assassins as well but as Long has promised Wendy, Dinosaur himself was Long's target. Long pulls out a knife and slices Dinosaur’s throat before he pulled the trigger. Meanwhile, Long and his brother wait for Wendy's uncle but it was a trap, the driver from the car shot Kwan several times. Long, ran to his brother but was rammed off the harbor.

Long was rescued by Mei, who thanked him for letting her live. Mei had surgeons alter his facial tissues so he will look like a normal human. Once Long wakes up from his coma, Mei begins to teach Long how to have sex. Mei reveals that she used to be a whore and slept with thousands of strangers. She said she had a talent to not only to seduce men, but women as well. She seduced a wealthy lady to give her all of her money after a three-year relationship. She trained Long and gave him a new identity to return to Hong Kong as Michael.

Meanwhile, in Hong Kong, Wendy had a new boyfriend and in crime partner, Jimmy. Both were happy to learn that Dragon's men were dead. Michael is now working as a henchmen. The two leaders now in charge of Dragon's business, meet their client "Bull" in an Italian restaurant. Bull ambushes them and Long manages to escape with Wendy, Jimmy is captured. Michael then seduces Wendy and they spent the night together. Wendy was aroused when she saw him swim and drink in the morning. When Bull demands a ransom for Jimmy, Wendy turns it into a joke. Angered, Bull amputates Jimmy's nose and mails it to Wendy. Michael plans to kill Bull and tells Wendy to first seduce him and give him a poison glass to drink from. After Bull is poisoned, she would escape from the secret chamber. Wendy agrees but when she gives Bull a poisoned glass and attempts to escape, she discovers that the chamber is a dead end and Michael has set her up. Bull is revealed to not have been poisoned either. Bull then orders his men to have Wendy gang raped. Suddenly police came and arrests everyone.

Michael later breaks into Kent's house and purposely, has Kent shot him in the chest, saying that he would want to die in the hands of someone worthy.
