= Martial Angels =

2001 Hong Kong film by Clarence Fok

- Film poster
- Directed by: Clarence Fok Yiu-leung
- Written by: Sharon Hui
- Produced by: Erica Mak
- Starring: Julian Cheung; Shu Qi
- Cinematography: Edmond Fung Yuen Man
- Production company: Film Power Company Ltd.
- Release date: 14 February 2001
- Running time: 87 minutes
- Country: Hong Kong
- Language: Cantonese
- Box office: HK$4.9 million

Martial Angels (Chinese: 絕色神偷) is a 2001 Hong Kong film directed by Clarence Fok Yiu-leung.

The film has been described as part of the "girls with guns revival" cycle of the early 2000s. Other films in this subgenre included The Wesley's Mysterious File (2002) and So Close (2002).

== Plot ==
Martial Angel tells of Cat, a professional thief turned straight after leaving her lover, Chi Lam, two years before. But her past returns to haunt her as Chi Lam is kidnapped for the ransom of security software belonging to the company Cat works for. In order to rescue him, she calls on her old friends from her orphanage days, six other feisty women, to save the day.

The basic story starts with a pair of burglars who meet in action and some sparks fly, but the two soon break up and move on. The female burglar is Cat and she soon meets up with some other female burglars, seven of them to be exact. When her former partner ends up in trouble and needs help, Cat and her newfound friends have to take action, before it is too late. She is forced to steal a top secret product in exchange for his life, but of course, it won’t be that simple. As factors shift and alliances are formed & broken in quick fashion, who will emerge on top?

== Cast ==
- Julian Cheung - Zi-Yang
- Shu Qi - Cat
- Kelly Lin - Octopus
- Sandra Ng - Monkey
- Teresa Mak - Goldfish
- Rachel Ngan - Pigeon
- Terence Yin - Bone
- Rosemary Vandenbroucke - Peacock
- Amanda Strang - Spider
- Wong Jing - Fred
- Ron Smoorenburg - Paracov
- Max Ruddock - Barry, henchmen

== See also ==
- Girls with guns
