= Billy Chung =

Billy Cheung
- Born: Hong Kong
- Occupations: film director, producer

Chinese name
- Traditional Chinese: 鍾少雄
- Simplified Chinese: 锺少雄
Transcriptions
Standard Mandarin
- Hanyu Pinyin: Zhōng Shǎo Xióng
Yue: Cantonese
- Jyutping: Jung1 Siu3 Hung4
- Musical career
- Also known as: Billy Cheung Siu-Hung, Billy Cheung Siu Hung
- Origin: Hong Kong

Billy Cheung is a Hong Kong–based director.

== Filmography ==
Year	Film	Notes
2020	The Infernal Walker	Producer
2017	The Golden Monk	Co-director with Wong Jing
2017	Revenge for Love	Co-director with Tian Meng
2009	To Live and Die in Mongkok	Co-director with Wong Jing
2008	Hong Kong Bronx	
2007	Undercover	
2007	The Lady Iron Chef	
2005	Moments of Love	
2005	Kung Fu Mahjong	Co-director with Wong Jing
2005	Colour of the Loyalty	
2005	Set Up	
2003	Shiver	
2002	Devil Face, Angel Heart	
2002	Naked Weapon	Associate producer, planning
2002	Possessed	
2001	The Cheaters	
2001	Espirit D'Amour	
2001	My Schoolmate the Barbarian	
2000	High K	
2000	Paramount Hotel	
2000	Undercover Blues	
2000	Killer	Director, writer
1999	Last Ghost Standing	Director, writer
1999	High Tension Crime	
1999	Two Faces	Director, producer
1999	Trust Me U Die	
1996	Midnight Express in the Orient	Director, writer
1996	King of Robbery	
1993	Lady Super Cop	
1993	The Assassin	
1993	Love to Kill	
1991	Legend of the Brothers	
1989	Proud and Confident	Assistant director
1987	Brotherhood	Writer
1986	Teenage Trap	
1981	Hired Guns	Actor
1977	The End of Wicked Guns	Actor
