= Terence Yin =

American actor

- Chinese: 尹子維
- Born: Yin chi-wai 19 May 1975 (age 51); Hong Kong
- Occupations: Actor, singer
- Years active: 1998–present
- Parents: Kang Wei (father); Jenny Hu (mother)

Terence Yin Chi-wai (Chinese: 尹子維; pinyin: Yǐn Zǐwéi; Cantonese Yale: Wan Jiwai, born 19 May 1975) is a Hong Kong film actor, singer, producer, and media relations specialist. Yin has starred in over 30 movies, released one solo album and resides in Hong Kong.

== Early life ==
May 19, 1975, Yin was born in Hong Kong. Yin's mother was Jenny Hu, a 1960s–70s Shaw Brothers Studios actress. Yin's father was Kang Wei (1940–2013), a film director. Yin has one older brother, Christopher Yin.

In 1983, at 7 years old, Yin and his brother Christopher came to Los Angeles, California. In 1993, Yin graduated from Mark Keppel High School in Alhambra, California.

== Education ==
In 1997, Yin earned a Philosophy (Rhetorics) degree from UC Berkeley.

== Career ==
Yin made his film debut in Yonfan's 1998 Bishonen opposite Daniel Wu, one of his close friends and frequent collaborators.

Yin released a solo album in Taiwan in 1999 titled Undecided, which met with limited success.

In 2003, Yin with fellow Hong Kong actor Simon Yam made their Hollywood debut in the film Lara Croft: Tomb Raider – The Cradle of Life as the villains Chen Lo and Xien Lo, brothers who are in a fictional Chinese syndicate called the Shay Ling who are opposite of the lead character Lara Croft portrayed by Angelina Jolie.

In 2005, Yin, with Daniel Wu, Conroy Chan, and Andrew Lin formed a boyband experiment named Alive.

In 2012, Yin, made his second Hollywood appearance in the film The Man with the Iron Fists, which had a diverse cast of Hollywood, Hong Kong and Chinese actors. He also appeared in the 2012 Hong Kong film Cold War and voiced the character Dirty Ming in the video game Sleeping Dogs.

Yin is a partner in the online social network Alivenotdead.com with his Alive bandmates and the founders of the movie website Rotten Tomatoes. The site, created to support the movie The Heavenly Kings and Alive, was relaunched in April 2007 as an online community supporting artists worldwide.

== Filmography ==
Year	Title	Alternate	Role	Notes
1981	Daughter and Father	天真有牙		
1998	Hot War	幻影特攻	Alien	
1998	Bishonen	美少年之戀	K.S	
1999	Metade Fumaca	半支煙	Brother Chai	
1999	Rave Fever	周末狂熱	Stephen	
1999	Gen-X Cops	特警新人類	Tooth	
2000	Dial D for Demons	炭燒凶咒	PJ	
2000	Skyline Cruisers	神偷次世代	Ah Lung	
2000	Lavender	薰衣草	Angel playing violin	
2000	Home Sweet Home	千年等一天	Du Quaing	
2001	Bullets of Love	不死情謎	Night/Wong Po	
2001	Gold Fingers	二五傳說		
2001	Martial Angels	絕色神偷	Bone	
2001	Mist in Judge	疊影殺機		
2001	Final Romance – Tenyakuyûjô 3	願望樹	Mon Yeung	
2002	Black Mask 2: City of Masks	黑俠 II	Dr David	
2002	Color of Pain	野狼	Dino	
2002	Dead or Alive: Final		Fong	
2003	Colour of the Truth	黑白森林	Cyclops	
2003	Boxing Hero	龍虎英雄	Tiger	
2003	The Trouble-Makers	一屋兩火	Szeto Ginyi	
2003	Lara Croft: Tomb Raider – The Cradle of Life		Xien	
2004	New Police Story	新警察故事	Fire	
2005	Kung Fu Majong 2	雀聖2自摸天后	Johnnie	
2005	PTU File – Death Trap	PTU女警之偶然陷阱	Yu Fei	
2005	Drink-Drank-Drunk	千杯不醉	Wanderer	
2005	Police Love Affairs	左輪右妳	Fai	
2006	The Heavenly Kings	四大天王	Terence Yin	artist; producer
2006	McDull, the Alumni	春田花花同學會	hostage-taker	
2006	Rob-B-Hood	寶貝計劃	Max Hung	
2007	The Valiant Ones New	新忠烈圖		
2007	Fear Factors	恐懼元素	Tin King	
2008	Legend of the Fist: Chen Zhen	精武陳真		
2009	Look for a Star	遊龍戲鳳	Joseph	
2009	Fog	雾	Wai	
2009	Vengeance	復仇	Chu	English dub for the original character portrayed by Lam Ka-Tung
2011	Don't Go Breaking My Heart	單身男女		
2011	Life Without Principle	奪命金	宋先生	
2012	Strangers 6			
2012	Sleeping Dogs	热血无赖 (non-official)	"Dirty" Ming/Additional voices	Video game
2012	Cold War	寒戰	Man To	
2012	The Man with the Iron Fists	鐵拳 (non-official)	Governor	
2013	Lost for Words	欲言又止 (non-official)	Victor	
2013	Special ID	特殊身份	Terry	
2013	Firestorm	風暴	Goofy	
2014	Zombie Fight Club	尸城	Bro Fung	
2015	Second Life	第二人生		TV series
2015	Love in Time	還來得及再愛你		TV series
2015	Wild City	謎城		
2016	Chinese Wine	國酒	Cheng Yufeng	
2016	Cold War 2	寒戰2	Man To	
2016	S Storm	S風暴	Tang Siu-hung	
2017	Love Contractually			
2017	Chasing the Dragon			
2018	The Adjudicator			
2024	Anaconda	狂蟒之灾	Jeff	
