= ShellZ Zhu =

Chinese model and actress

- Born: Nanjing, China
- Occupations: Actress; model
- Years active: 1996–present

ShellZ Zhu is a Chinese model and actress.

== Biography ==
Born in Nanjing, China, Zhu moved to Hong Kong as an early adolescent. After moving to Hong Kong, she began to initially garner public recognition through theatrical performances of traditional Chinese dance. At age 17, she transitioned from dance to modeling, as she began to promote fashion, commercial attire, editorials, and print-outs. While still modeling, she was offered her first movie role in the Hong Kong film Gorgeous. After acting in Chinese language Hong Kong movies, ShellZ moved to Hollywood, California to further her acting career. While in the United States, she was offered acting roles in Hollywood hits, such as Steven Spielberg's The Terminal and Michael Mann's Collateral. Before returning to Hong Kong in 2008, Zhu (Stage name: Siu wai Cheung on IMDB) accepted a major role in the feature film Extra Ordinary Barry. In the film Hard Fall, she played lead role Veronica.

== Personal life ==
Zhu currently resides in Hong Kong S.A.R. She enjoys dressage, singing, and badminton. She is also an autoracing enthusiast, and actively participates in karting. Zhu is fluent in English, Cantonese, and Mandarin, and maintains basic proficiency in Japanese.

== Selected filmography ==
=== Film ===
- Flashes (in production)
- Hard Fall (2009) - Nominated for the best film in AIFF
- Lumina (2009) - On YouTube/lumina webisode 2, 3 and 7
- Extra Ordinary Barry (2008)
- The Terminal (2005)
- Naked in the 21st Century (2004)
- The Blood Rules (2002)
- Conspiracy (2000)
- Resort Massacre (2000)
- Boh Lee Chyn-Gorgeous (Jackie Chan Production - 1998)
- In Love with Industry (Hong Kong Production - 1997)

=== Television ===
- Human Trafficking - Lead (Girl Right next door) (LifeTime Television)
- The View Show-RunWay, Entertainer (ABC Studios, NYC)
- Ripley's Believe It or Not - an episode (with Kelly Packard-NYC)
- Ananda Lewis Show - Runway model (CBS Studio, NYC)
- Call Any Time Talk Show - Host (Hong Kong i-Cable TV)
