= Stolen Love (2001 film) =

2001 Hong Kong film by Alan Mak

- DVD cover
- Traditional Chinese: 別戀
- Hanyu Pinyin: Bit luen
- Directed by: Alan Mak
- Screenplay by: Felix Chong
- Produced by: David Chan Sek-Hong
- Starring: Raymond Lam; Rain Lee
- Edited by: Cheung Ka-Fai
- Music by: Tommy Wai Kai-Leung
- Production company: Golden Harvest Company
- Distributed by: Gala Film Distribution; Golden Harvest Company
- Release date: 6 December 2001; (Hong Kong)
- Country: Hong Kong
- Language: Cantonese
- Box office: HK$887,910

Stolen Love (Chinese: 別戀; pinyin: Bit luen, literally "Don't Fall in Love") is a 2001 Hong Kong romance film written by Felix Chong and directed by Alan Mak. It was Alan Mak's first collaboration with Felix Chong.

== Plot ==
Distracted by an advertisement on the side of a bus featuring the face of Angela Lok, promising architect Rick is struck by a car as he crosses the street to meet his coworker girlfriend Annie on the other side. Suffering from a loss of creativity and obsessed with the image of author Angela Lok following the accident, a psychotherapist says that he may have actually known Angela Lok before the accident but is repressing the memories. The psychotherapist suggests finding Angela Lok and smelling her to awaken the memories.

Angela Lok lives in the Puyong Building, whose residents are upset with its disrepair and are therefore mistakenly protesting Rick's design firm rather than the current building operators. When she is near him, Rick regains the ability to create, and when they touch, he is flooded with memories of a possible past they shared together. Rick moves into the Puyong Building in order to be near her for inspiration. When she leaves the building, he must secretly follow her with his sketchpad to maintain his creativity in order to complete his current project. While doing so, he overhears Angela interviewing people about their heartbreak stories for her books and concluding each interview by mercilessly criticizing each interviewee for holding on to a relationship that is long over instead of forgetting it and moving on.

When they are brought together by Granny Mary suddenly falling ill (but quickly recovering), Angela reveals that due to having the flu she has no memory of the period of November and December 1999, the same period that Rick can no longer remember, but Rick's name is in her otherwise empty interview notes for that period. The two touch and remember flickers of their past. Angela convinces Rick to revisit the remembered locations with her to recreate their memories and interview the people there to gain information about their forgotten past as research for her new book about regaining memory as opposed to her usual books advising people to forget. They meet two flower sellers who remember Rick and Angela buying white daisies there on New Year's Eve 1999.

When Rick and Angela fall in love and kiss, Angela remembers their history. On New Year's Eve, building developers New International Ltd. declare that the Puyong Building should be torn down, but the protesting residents refuse to leave. Annie convinces the developers to accept Rick's proposal to retain the building as the center of a new development. Angela and Lok Sai explain to Rick that Angela is an angel who was sent to Earth four years ago to help people overcome their heartbreak, but if an angel breaks the rules by falling in love, the couple will forget everything about their love at midnight after their first day of being in love. This happened to Rick and Angela at midnight on New Year's Eve 1999 and will happen to them again at midnight on New Year's Eve 2001. Because she has broken the rules a second time, she will not be allowed to return to Earth again. At midnight, Rick forgets Angela and Angela disappears. It rains for a month, delaying the redevelopment of the area, during which time the remnants of an old church are found on the premises. Workers recover two angel statues, one of them a guardian angel.

== Cast ==
- Raymond Lam as Rick Kwok
- Rain Lee as Angela Lok
- Cheung Tat-ming as So
- Margaret Chung as Annie
- Wyman Wong as Lok Sai "Mr. Nosy"
- Wong Yat-fei as Longlife
- Joe Ma as Joe
- Cheang Pou-soi as Dr. Alan Mak
- Joe Summer as Jessica
- Wong Jan-kau as Bartender
- Samson Yeung as Charming Yeung
- Lee Fung as Granny Mary Wong

== Production ==
The film was shot in Hong Kong.

== Release ==
The film had a theatrical run in Hong Kong from 6 to 20 December 2001, earning HK$887,910.

== Reception ==
Reviewer Andrew Saroch of fareastfilms.com gave the film a rating of 2 out of 5 stars, writing, "The premise of 'Stolen Love' is an intriguing one: the idea of a character unsure of if he loved or even met the woman who haunts his memories is full of potential, having the necessary components to surprise the viewer. Sadly, the actual execution of the idea is slipshod at best. Rife with plot-holes, underwritten characters and a complete lack of thematic direction, this is film-making at its most disappointing."

Reviewer Kozo of lovehkfilm.com wrote, "The set-up for this high-schooler romance is exceptionally elaborate, promising at hidden plot points not revealed until the final ten minutes of the film. Until then, all we can do is satisfy ourselves with pretty people mugging for each other and the camera. Watching Rick and Angela fall in love is passably entertaining, but not much else."

Reviewer Stardust of hkmdb.com wrote, "Overall, Rain/Raymond fans would love the movie. As for the others, expect a bittersweet romantic movie with an awkward/unexpected twist that can throw you off board on determining the movie's genre. For those looking for real acting, you'll find some good talents, but definitely not from Rain."

The review of the film on sogoodreviews.com reads, "By the time director Alan Mak and writer Felix Chong reveals their high concept for Silent Love, you firmly realize what a missed opportunity this romance was. An entire different cast & crew of note should attempt this love story again, preferably one headed by Derek Yee and not do what Mak does here, which is a whole bucket of wrongs."

Reviewer Simon of the14amazons.co.uk gave the film 3.5 out of 5 stars, calling it a "Clever and unusual romance. Not a 'romantic comedy' for a change, though there are funny moments. Some genre standards are followed (she's "quirky" & he's shallow, they hate each other when they first meet etc.), but the movie explores some new ground that makes it stand out - especially the surprisingly downbeat ending. Good characters, good script, nice direction. Recommended."

Author Gabriel Chong called it one of Alan Mak's "youth-oriented movies", along with Rave Fever (1999) and Final Romance (2001).
