= The Infernal Walker =

2020 Hong Kong film by Ally Wong

- Film poster
- Traditional Chinese: 無間行者之生死潛行
- Simplified Chinese: 无间行者之生死潜行
- Hanyu Pinyin: Wú Jiàn Xíng Zhě Zhī Shēng Dǐ Qián Xíng
- Jyutping: Mou4 Gaan3 Hang4 Ze2 Zi1 Sang1 Sei2 Cim4 Hang4
- Directed by: Ally Wong
- Screenplay by: Samson Sun
- Produced by: Alvin Lam; Billy Chung
- Starring: Michael Tse; Pakho Chau; Ray Lui
- Cinematography: Billy Ko
- Edited by: Chow Man-keung
- Music by: Wong Hap
- Production companies: Universe Entertainment; Shenzhen Doudou Image Television and Film Culture Media; Universe Matrix Century Films Distribution (Beijing) Company; Universe Films Distribution
- Distributed by: Universe Films Distribution (Hong Kong, Worldwide); Gala Film Distribution (Hong Kong)
- Release date: 19 November 2020
- Running time: 91 minutes
- Country: Hong Kong
- Language: Cantonese
- Box office: US$100,000

The Infernal Walker (Chinese: 無間行者之生死潛行), previously known as The Spy Walker and The Redeemer (Chinese: 戒命人), is a 2020 Hong Kong action film produced by Billy Chung and directed by Ally Wong. The film stars Michael Tse as an undercover cop who infiltrates the triads and Pakho Chau as a triad mole planted into the police force. The Infernal Walker is the first film of a planned trilogy. Originally set for release on 30 September 2020, the film's release was postponed to 19 November 2020.

== Plot ==
Ting Cheuk-fei (Michael Tse) is an undercover police officer who has been infiltrating the Fuk Wo (福和) triad gang for seven years. In order to keep his cover, Ting is more ruthless than other triad members and helps him gradually get closer to his goal. When a fellow undercover cop, Van, was captured by Shawn (Ben Ng), a leader of Fuk Wo, Ting was forced to torture him and watch him get killed, Ting grows tired of his never-ending undercover job.

On the other hand, Tuen Yat-fan (Pakho Chau) work for drug lord Sung Ching-kwong's (Kenneth Chan) who was planted mole in the Hong Kong Police Force. Tuen was just promoted to chief inspector of the Anti-Triad Unit and is slated to become superintendent in two years. Tuen also successfully proposes to his girlfriend, Sin-yeung (Shiga Lin), who works in the unit's interior department, and longs to become a real policeman.

The Fuk Wo is collaborating on a drug trade with Sung's Eastern Trading Company and Tuen is assigned by his superior to lead the raid to bust the trade, which he decides not to inform Sung. On the other hand, Ting is picked by Fuk Wo main leader, Brother Hei (Benz Hui) along with two other fellow triads to execute the trade. Ting coordinates with his handler, Officer Lau (Ray Lui), who gives him an invisible marker which he uses to give the location of the trade in Ap Lei Pai to Lau, and successfully busts the trade. However, the trade was actually a setup by Hei and Sung using C-grade cocaine and counterfeit cash for the former to find the mole in his gang while they have their actual trade in Central.

Hei's assistant, East, who turns out to be a mole planted by Sung in Fuk Wo, discovers Ting's invisible market writings to Lau and also figures Tuen wants to betray Sung. Sung kills Sin-yeung and frames it on Ting, who was knocked out by a taser. Ting sets up to find the hitman who killed Sin-yeung while Lau investigates on Tuen. With the help of a fellow triad, Nasty (Cheung Pak-man), Ting finds the hitman, who flees after a scuffle but bumps into Tuen and Ting convinces him the hitman was the one who killed his fiance. Nasty helps Ting find the hitman, who is ready to flee in the docks and Ting beats and ties up the hitman, who kills Nasty, before calling Tuen and persuades him to investigate who is the mastermind, which he discovers to be Sung.

Tuen later helps Ting expose East to Hei to keep Ting's cover before driving away in a fit of rage to seek revenge on Sung. When Tuen confronts Sung in the docks, the latter kicks Tuen in the water and on the verge to shoot him, but Ting arrives in time to stop Sung and engages the latter in a scuffle. Tuen gets up and picks up his gun and shoots Sung, who also shoots Tuen at the same time, and they are both killed. In the end, Hei, Shawn and Ting's boss, Joss (Kenny Wong) all receive life sentences for charges including murder, manslaughter and drug trafficking, and Ting finally completes his mission while finding Tuen's police identification and throws it in the water.

== Cast ==
- Michael Tse as Ting Cheuk-fei (丁卓飛), nicknamed Flying Nail (飛釘), an undercover police officer sent to infiltrate the Fuk Wo (福和) triad gang. Having been undercover for seven years, he grows tired and longs for a normal life.
- Pakho Chau as Tuen Yat-fan (段一凡), chief inspector of the Anti-Triad Unit who is actually a mole planted by Sung to infiltrate the police force. He's been working for Sung since he was a teenager, but his success in his career and love life causes him to want to go straight and be a real policeman.
- Ray Lui as Lau Tin-nam (劉天南), Ting's undercover handler who is a superintendent of the Criminal Intelligence Bureau.
- Oscar Leung as Cheung Sing-kit (張星杰), Big Banana's chief henchmen in charge of beatings and killings.
- Kenneth Chan as Sung Ching-kwong (宋正光), a major drug lord who operates the Tung Lei Trading (東利貿易) company and wants to usurp Fuk Wo.
- Benz Hui as Chan Yau-hei (陳又喜), known as Brother Hei (喜哥), main leader of the Fuk Wo triad gang.
- Ben Ng as Kam Chiu-nin (甘昭年), nicknamed Shawn (大蕉), one of Brother Hei's right hand man who is violet, arrogant, but lacks wits.
- Gan Tingting as Carrie (嘉莉), Ting's confidant and romantic interest who is an owner of a high-class restaurant.
- Shiga Lin as Lam Sin-yeung (林倩揚), an officer of the Anti-Triad Unit's Interior Department and Tuen's fiance.
- Kenny Wong as Leung Cheuk-sang (梁焯生), nicknamed Joss (火牛), one of Brother Hei's right hand man who is calm and wise. He is Ting's boss and sworn brother who greatly trusts Ting.
- Cheung Pak-man as Nasty (口臭), a member of the Fuk Wo triad who is Ting's friend.

== Production ==
Production for The Infernal Walker took in Hong Kong in 2019 and wrapped up in early April of the same year, where a celebration banquet was held in Knutsford Terrace, Tsim Sha Tsui.

== Release ==
The Infernal Walker was originally set for theatrical release on 30 September 2020, but was later pushed back to 19 November 2020, where it was released in Hong Kong.

== Reception ==
=== Box office ===
The Infernal Walker debuted at No. 4 on its opening weekend in Hong Kong, grossing HK$481,847 during its first four days of release. During its second weekend, the film grossed HK$292,283 and was placed at No. 9, accumulating a total gross of HK$774,130 by then. On its third weekend, the film remained at No. 9 and grossed HK$44,430, having accumulated a total gross of HK$818,560 so far.

Opening in Taiwan on 27 November 2020, the film grossed NT$350,000 during its first three days of release, placing at No. 20 in its debut weekend. On its second weekend, the film grossed NT$260,000, placing at No. 28, and have grossed a total of NT$610,000 so far.

=== Critical reception ===
Edmund Lee of the South China Morning Post gave the film a score of 2.5/5 stars, praising Michael Tse and Pakho Chau's performances and director Ally Wong in keeping the narrative diverting, but criticizes the choppy editing and underdeveloped characters.
