= 40th Golden Horse Awards =

Award ceremony for Chinese-language films of 2002 and 2003

- Promotional poster
- Date: December 13, 2003
- Site: Tainan Municipal Cultural Center, Tainan, Taiwan
- Hosted by: Kevin Tsai and Carol Cheng
- Preshow hosts: Dennis Nieh and Chia Yeong-chieh
- Organized by: Taipei Golden Horse Film Festival Executive Committee

Highlights
- Best Feature Film: Infernal Affairs
- Best Director: Andrew Lau and Alan Mak; Infernal Affairs
- Best Actor: Tony Leung Chiu-wai; Infernal Affairs
- Best Actress: Sandra Ng; Golden Chicken
- Most awards: Infernal Affairs (5)
- Most nominations: Infernal Affairs (12)

Television in Taiwan
- Channel: TVBS-G
- Ratings: 1.73% (average)

The 40th Golden Horse Awards (Mandarin:第40屆金馬獎) took place on December 13, 2003 at the Tainan Municipal Cultural Center in Tainan, Taiwan.

== Winners and nominees ==
Winners are listed first and highlighted in boldface.

**Best Feature Film**: **Infernal Affairs**; The Missing; Goodbye, Dragon Inn; PTU; Blind Shaft	**Best Short Film**: **Badu's Homework**; In Light; Papa Blue
**Best Documentary**: **Viva Tonal - The Dance Age**; Burning Dreams; Traces of a Dragon; Nail	**Best Animation Feature** -
**Best Director**: **Andrew Lau and Alan Mak — Infernal Affairs**; Johnnie To — PTU; Pang Ho-cheung — Men Suddenly in Black; Tsai Ming-liang — Goodbye, Dragon Inn	**Best Leading Actor**: **Tony Leung Chiu-wai — Infernal Affairs**; Andy Lau — Infernal Affairs; Daniel Wu — Night Corridor; Simon Yam — PTU
**Best Leading Actress**: **Sandra Ng — Golden Chicken**; Ariel Lin — Love Me, If You Can; Chen Shiang-chyi — Goodbye, Dragon Inn; Lu Yi-ching — The Missing	**Best Supporting Actor**: **Anthony Wong — Infernal Affairs**; Chapman To — Men Suddenly in Black; Lam Suet — PTU; Chen Mu-yi — Black Dog Is Coming
**Best Supporting Actress**: **Lin Mei-hsiu — Black Dog Is Coming**; Candy Lo — Truth or Dare: 6th Floor Rear Flat; Kara Wai — Night Corridor; Terri Kwan — Turn Left, Turn Right	**Best New Performer**: **Wang Baoqiang — Blind Shaft**; **Megan Zheng — Homerun**; Chang Chieh — The Missing
**Audience Choice Award**: **Infernal Affairs**	**Outstanding Taiwanese Film of the Year**: **Goodbye, Dragon Inn**
**Outstanding Taiwanese Filmmaker of the Year**: **Liao Pen-jung**	**Lifetime Achievement Award**: **Yuan Tsung-mei**
