= Beauty and the Breast =

2002 Hong Kong film by Raymond Yip

- DVD cover
- Traditional Chinese: 豐胸秘Cup
- Simplified Chinese: 丰胸秘Cup
- Hanyu Pinyin: Fēng Xiōng Mì Cup
- Jyutping: Fung1 Hung1 Bei3 Cup
- Directed by: Raymond Yip
- Screenplay by: Jing Wong
- Produced by: John Chong
- Starring: Francis Ng; Michelle Reis; Daniel Wu
- Cinematography: Venus Keung; Thomas Yeung
- Edited by: Marco Mak
- Music by: Lincoln Lo
- Production companies: Mega Star Production; Bad Boy Film Culture
- Distributed by: Media Asia Distribution
- Release date: 24 January 2002
- Running time: 97 minutes
- Country: Hong Kong
- Language: Cantonese
- Box office: HK$3,164,690

Beauty and the Breast (Chinese: 豐胸秘Cup) is a 2002 Hong Kong comedy film directed by Raymond Yip, and starring Francis Ng, Michelle Reis and Daniel Wu.

== Synopsis ==
The story is about Mario (Ng), who is an office loafer who specializes in praising and pleasing his boss, the good-for-nothing eldest son of a business tycoon. Mario considers Harper (Wu) his apprentice, and together the two go about town picking up women. Mario has a theory that links the characteristics of a woman's breasts to her character. Without knowing that Yuki (Reis) is going to be his new colleague, he predicts her to be of his type from the shape of her breasts while she is standing outside a glass window of a restaurant. Despite his deserving reputation of being a womanizer, Mario is really kind at heart, but he is soon lured into a bet with his boss and has to get Yuki into bed to win it. He comes up with the brilliant plan of telling her that he has a malignant brain tumor in its terminal stage. Thanks to his acting skill, she totally buys his story. Using his smooth tongue, Mario soon turns Yuki's sympathy into love. But it is not long before Yuki brings him home and her father, who is a Chinese traditional medicine doctor, diagnose his lie. Quietly Yuki and her female colleagues strike back with a vengeance. She fools Mario and his sidekick, Harper, into taking an excessively large dose of a highly potent breast-enlarging tonic her father had concocted. Soon the two men are endowed with cup sizes many women would envy, but would freak men out.

== Cast ==
- Francis Ng as Mario
- Michelle Reis as Yuki
- Daniel Wu as Harper
- Halina Tam as Amy
- Amanda Strang as Ada
- Angela Tong as Lilliana
- Sophie Ngan as Cathalina
- Matt Chow as Brother Fat
- Lam Chi-chung as Choi
- Wong Yat-fei as Chan Pak-cheung
- Wong Tin-lam as Chu Senior
- Ching Siu-lung as Mr. Lei
- Gobby Wong as Clerk
- Ng Choi-yuk as Clerk
