= Set Up (2005 film) =

2005 Hong Kong film by Billy Chung

- DVD cover
- Traditional Chinese: 凶男寡女
- Simplified Chinese: 凶男寡女
- Hanyu Pinyin: Xiōng Nán Guǎ Nǚ
- Jyutping: Hung1 Naam4 Gwa2 Neoi2
- Directed by: Billy Chung
- Written by: Wong Jing
- Produced by: Wong Jing
- Starring: Christy Chung; Michael Tse; Roy Cheung
- Cinematography: Joe Chan
- Edited by: Poon Hung
- Music by: Alan Wong
- Distributed by: China Star Entertainment Group
- Release date: 2 June 2005
- Running time: 95 minutes
- Country: Hong Kong
- Language: Cantonese

Set Up is a 2005 Hong Kong horror thriller film directed by Billy Chung, and written by Wong Jing, who also produced. The film stars Christy Chung, Michael Tse, and Roy Cheung.

== Plot ==
Moon Siu is a horror story writer who got refractive surgery the day before her wedding. That night she stays at an unfurnished house in the suburb with her sister Yan. When Moon was sleeping, three robbers Pau, Kei and Man, who were hiding out there, kill Yan and her boyfriend and stuff her corpse in the refrigerator. Later Moon finds Yan's corpse and arrests Kei when her fiancé Ted arrives. Unknown to Moon, Ted actually belongs to the same gang as the robbers.

== Cast ==
- Christy Chung as Moon Siu
- Michael Tse as Ted
- Roy Cheung as Pau
- Tony Ho as Kei
- Winnie Leung as Yan
- Johnny Lu as Edmund
- Marco Lok as Man
- Alan Ng as Red Ox

*Pang Mei Seung as provision store boss
