= Shiver (2003 film) =

2003 Hong Kong film by Billy Chung

- Film poster
- Traditional Chinese: 心寒
- Simplified Chinese: 心寒
- Hanyu Pinyin: Xīn Hán
- Jyutping: Sam1 Hon4
- Directed by: Billy Chung
- Screenplay by: Paul Chung
- Produced by: Billy Chan
- Starring: Francis Ng; Athena Chu; Nick Cheung; Tiffany Lee
- Cinematography: Choi Sung-fai; Chan Yiu-ming
- Edited by: Poon Hung
- Music by: Matsuzaki Geki; Tajima Taku; Yoshida Naoki; Lee Kai-cheung
- Production companies: Universe Entertainment; Hand Made Films Company
- Distributed by: Universe Films Distribution
- Release date: 4 September 2003
- Running time: 87 minutes
- Country: Hong Kong
- Language: Cantonese

Shiver (released in the Philippines as Haunted Spirit) is a 2003 Hong Kong horror film directed by Billy Chung and starring Francis Ng, Athena Chu, Nick Cheung and Tiffany Lee.

== Plot ==
Regional Crime Unit officer Chan Kwok-ming (Francis Ng) and his wife, Sammi Mok (Athena Chu) were on the way to finalize their proceedings for separation where an armed robbery breaks out in the streets. Kwok-ming steps in to assist in hunting the criminals, but Sammi was hit by a stray bullet and was seriously injured, leading her into a coma. Several months later, Sammi awakes from her coma. Sammi's doctor, Ko Chuen (Nick Cheung) warns her to be especially careful with her body as her blood type is very rare.

Since Kwok-ming is often busy and handling cases at the police station, Sammi is left home along to recover and have been hallucinating often lately. One time, Sammi sees a female celebrity, Kitty Chow (Tiffany Lee), killed in her hallucination. While being skeptical, Sammi walks into the back alley of a bar and discovers the corpse of Kitty. Since then, Sammi's mental became more severe. When Kwok-ming wanted to take a leave at the police station, his supervisor demands him to cancel all his leaves and investigate the case of Kitty Chow's murder. One night, Kwok-ming returns home and sees the walls being covered in words written with blood. The same night, Sammi also goes mad and heads into the road, causing serious traffic congestion. Afterwards, Sammi was taken to hospital to be examined by a psychiatrist.

Meanwhile, Kwok-ming was investigating another case where a lawyer was murdered and discovers that the case is linked to the murder of Kitty Chow. While the crime scene, Kwok-ming shockingly witnesses the lawyer coming back to life and takes him to the hospital. In the hospital, Kwok-ming is informed that the lawyer requires an emergency blood transfusion from a rare blood type, which incidentally, happen to be the same blood type as Sammi. However, in this critical moment, Sammi mysteriously goes missing.

== Cast ==
- Francis Ng as Chan Kwok-ming (陳國明)
- Athena Chu as Sammi Mok (莫心怡)
- Nick Cheung as Dr. Ko Chuen (高川醫生)
- Tiffany Lee as Kitty Chow (周潔瑜)
- Benz Hui as Kwok-ming's supervisor
- Patrick Tang as Kwok-ming's subordinate
- Ben Cheung as Kwok-ming's subordinate
- Gloria Wong as Bobo Chan
- Viann Leung as Tracy
- Felix Lok as Coroner Bee (B哥)
- Siu Hung as Security guard
- Wong Man-shing as Robber
- Vincent Chik as Robber
- Wong Yui-sang as Robber
- Lam Kwok-kit as Policeman
- Lui Siu-ming as Policeman
- Sin Yan-kau
- Benny Lai

== Release ==
Shiver was released in Hong Kong on 4 September 2003. In the Philippines, the film was released as Haunted Spirit on 28 April 2004.

== Critical reception ==
Beyond Hollywood gave the film a mixed review, praising lead actor Francis Ng's performance and concluded the review stating "although it’s not a film of spectacular quality, there’s enough about Shiver to recommend." LoveHKFilm praised the direction of Billy Chung and the performances of Ng, Athena Chu and Nick Cheung, but criticizes how problems were easily and conveniently resolved. So Good Reviews praises its "effective establishments of character relationships" and Chung's direction of quick cut horror imagery, but criticizes the cinematography as "flat."
