= Last Ghost Standing =

1999 Hong Kong film by Billy Chung

- DVD cover.
- Traditional Chinese: 鬼請你睇戲
- Simplified Chinese: 鬼请你睇戏
- Hanyu Pinyin: Guǐ qǐng nǐ dì xì
- Jyutping: Gwai2 ceng2 nei5 tai2 hei3
- Directed by: Billy Chung
- Written by: Billy Chung; Simon Lui; Ng Kin-Hung
- Produced by: Ng Kin-Hung
- Starring: Sherming Yiu; Simon Lui; Alien Sun
- Cinematography: Yue Kok Ping
- Edited by: Poon Hung
- Music by: Alan Wong; Alan Lee
- Distributed by: Mandarin Films Distribution Co. Ltd.
- Release date: 1999
- Running time: 85 minutes
- Country: Hong Kong
- Language: Cantonese

Last Ghost Standing is a 1999 Hong Kong film directed by Billy Chung. The film is an adaptation of the novel by Simon Lui.

== Cast ==
- Sherming Yiu - Yiu-yiu
- Simon Lui Yue Yeung - Yang Yang
- Pauline Suen - Officer Suen
- Lai Yiu Cheung - Clerk Cheung
- Amanda Lee Wai-Man - Popcorn Clerk
- Angela Tong - Yen Yen
- Pinky Cheung - Pinky
- Benny Chan - Stoner
- Francis Ng - The Ghost
- Ng Chi Hung - Raymond Company Agent
- Chin Kar Lok - Jackie Chan Impersonator
