= Amanda Strang =

French actress, singer, presenter and fashion model

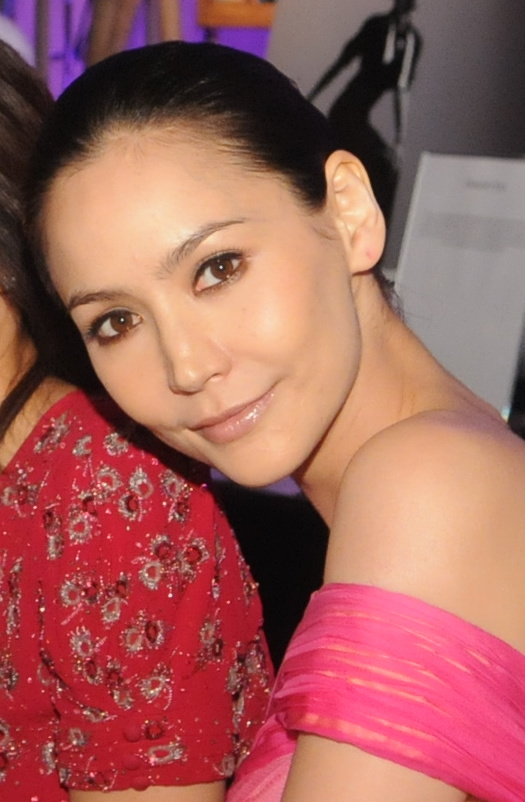
- Strang in 2011
- Born: January 21, 1980 (age 45); France
- Occupations: Actress, Model, Baker
- Spouse: Christian Cappelli (m. 2011; div. 2014)

Amanda Strang (born January 21, 1980), also known as Amanda S, is a French actress, singer, presenter and former fashion model based in Hong Kong. She appeared in 2001 movie Martial Angels and was a presenter on the food related television show Market Trotter. In 2011 she opened her own French pâtisserie petiteAmanda in Hong Kong.

== Biography ==
Strang was born in 1980 in Tahiti, French Polynesia to a French father and a Taiwanese mother. Being raised in Hong Kong, she moved with her family to India at age nine before starting to model and subsequently entering the film industry. Over the course of eight years she appeared in five different films and became a presenter on the food lifestyle show Market Trotter with food critic Chua Lam. Here she was convinced by Chua to pursue her dream of opening her own bakery. After graduating from the Paris-based culinary school Le Cordon Bleu in 2010 she apprenticed at French bakery Ladurée and the Caprice at the Four Seasons Hotel in Hong Kong. A year later Strang opened her own pâtisserie petiteAmanda in the IFC serving a range of French pastries and desserts.

== Filmography ==
=== Films ===
- 2001 — Martial Angels
- 2001 — Final Romance
- 2002 — Beauty and the Breast
- 2007 — Sum seung si sing
- 2008 — A Decade of Love
- 2024 — Customs Frontline

=== Television shows ===
Year	Title	Role	Network	Notes
2020	Beautivels	Host	HOY TV	EP7-9
