= Tainan Municipal Cultural Center =

Cultural center in East, Tainan, Taiwan

- 臺南文化中心
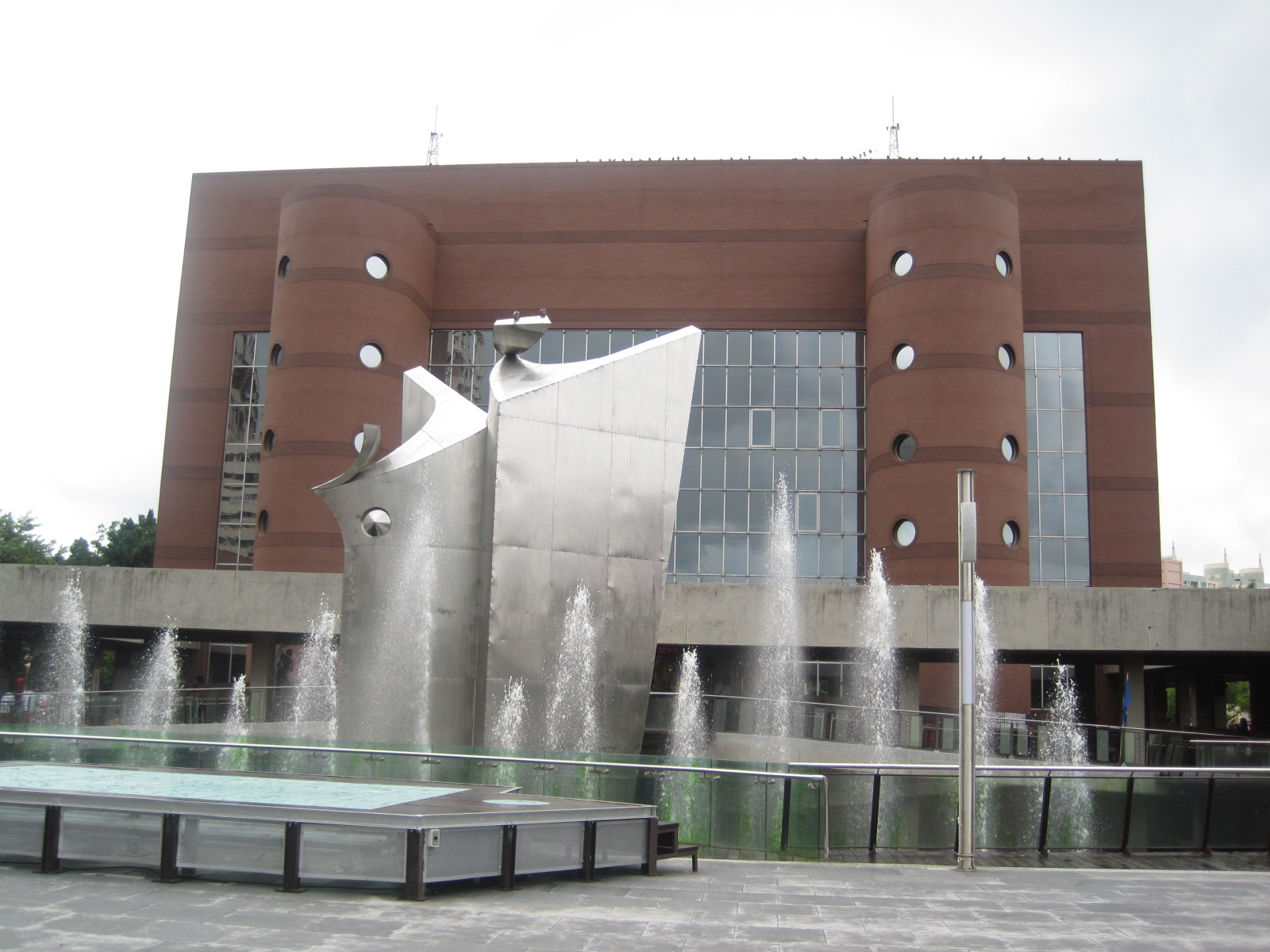
- Interactive map of the Tainan Municipal Cultural Center area
- Former names: Tainan Municipal Arts Center

General information
- Type: cultural center
- Location: East, Tainan, Taiwan
- Coordinates: 22°58′29.4″N 120°13′17.6″E
- Opened: 6 October 1984

Website
- Official website

The Tainan Municipal Cultural Center (TMCC; traditional Chinese: 臺南文化中心; simplified Chinese: 台南文化中心; pinyin: Táinán Wénhuà Zhōngxīn) is a cultural center in East District, Tainan, Taiwan.

== History ==
The construction of the center started in June 1980 and was inaugurated on 6 October 1984 as Tainan Municipal Cultural Center. In 2000, it was renamed to Tainan Municipal Arts Center. However, on 20 May 2004 it was renamed back again to Tainan Municipal Cultural Center.

== Buildings ==
- Cultural Artifacts Exhibition Hall
- International Conference Hall
- Performing Hall

== Notable events ==
- 40th Golden Horse Awards

== Transportation ==
The cultural center is accessible South from Tainan Station of Taiwan Railway.

== See also ==
- ICC Tainan
- List of tourist attractions in Taiwan
