= Fighting Fish =

2004 Dutch martial arts film

- Theatrical release poster
- Directed by: Jamel Aattache
- Written by: Kim Ho Kim; Jamel Aattache
- Produced by: Herman Slagter; Jamel Aattache
- Starring: Kim Ho Kim; Chantal Janzen; Jennifer de Jong; Ron Smoorenburg
- Cinematography: Peterjan van der Burgh
- Edited by: René Wiegmans
- Music by: Yorick Goldewijk
- Production companies: Three Kings Produkties; Riverpark Film
- Distributed by: Universal Pictures (through United International Pictures)
- Release date: 29 January 2004
- Running time: 85 minutes
- Country: Netherlands
- Languages: Chinese; English; Dutch
- Box office: $50,445

Fighting Fish is a 2004 Dutch martial arts film directed by Jamel Aattache, starring Kim Ho Kim, Chantal Janzen and Ron Smoorenburg. the film follows a former Chinese gang member A-Ken, who travels to Rotterdam seeking revenge after hearing about his brother's death. It was marketed as the first martial arts film to be produced in the Netherlands.

The film was released on 29 January 2004, It was a flop, receiving mixed reviews and only grossing over $50,445 at the Dutch box office.

== Cast ==
- Kim Ho Kim as A-Ken
- Chantal Janzen as Jennifer
- Ron Smoorenburg as Mark
- Jennifer de Jong as Lynn
- Banny Ho as Mr Yam
- Sing Li as Mr Mann

== See also ==
- List of martial arts films
