= Douyu =

Douyu may refer to:

- DouYu (Chinese: 斗鱼; pinyin: Dòuyú), a Chinese video live streaming service.
- Douyu (town) (simplified Chinese: 窦妪; traditional Chinese: 竇嫗; pinyin: Dòuyù), a town in Luancheng District, Shijiazhuang, Hebei province, China
