= Sam Lee (actor) =

Hong Kong actor

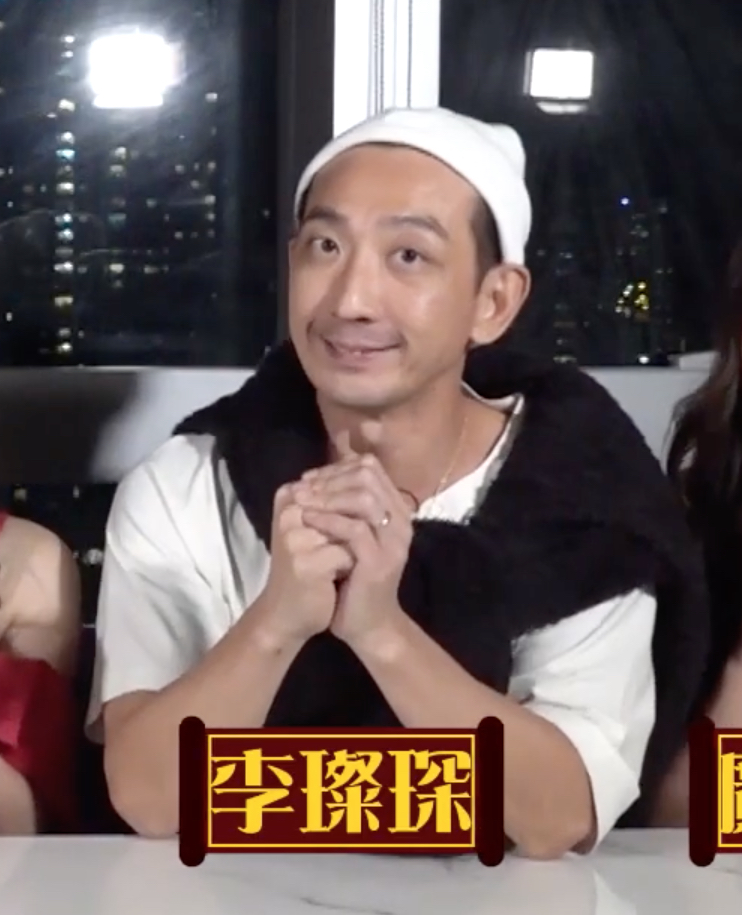
- Lee in 2020
- Born: Sam Lee Chan-sam (simplified Chinese: 李灿森; traditional Chinese: 李燦森; pinyin: Lǐ Cànsēn; Jyutping: Lei5 Caan3-sam1); 27 September 1975 (age 51); Hong Kong
- Occupation: Actor
- Years active: 1997–present

Chinese name
Transcriptions
Standard Mandarin
- Hanyu Pinyin: Lǐ Cànchēn
Yue: Cantonese
- Jyutping: Lei5 Caan3-sam1

Sam Lee Chan-sam (born 27 September 1975) is a Hong Kong actor. He started his film career when he was first spotted by director Fruit Chan, who cast him in Made in Hong Kong. Since his debut, Lee has appeared in dozens of films. He appeared in a Japanese film Ping Pong as one of the contestants in the movie. Lee is best known for his role as Sha Jang in the Hong Kong television series The Monkey King: Quest for the Sutra (2002).

Outside of his film career, Lee is a seasonal member of the Hong Kong hip hop band Lazy Mutha Fucka (LMF), in which he is the rapper. Sam Lee is also known as DJ Becareful.

== Filmography ==
=== Film ===
- Made in Hong Kong (1997)
- Nude Fear (1998)
- Beast Cops (1998)
- Bio Zombie (1998)
- Young and Dangerous: The Prequel (1998)
- A True Mob Story (1998)
- The Longest Summer (1998)
- Afraid of Nothing, The Jobless King (1999)
- When I Look Upon the Stars (1999)
- Gorgeous (1999) (cameo)
- Trust Me U Die (1999)
- Believe It or Not (1999)
- The King of Debt Collecting Agent (1999)
- Moonlight Express (1999) (cameo)
- Rules of the Game (1999)
- Gen-X Cops (1999)
- A Man Called Hero (1999)
- Metade Fumaca (1999)
- The Untold Story 3 (1999)
- Heaven of Hope (1999)
- Wan Chai Express (1999)
- Rave Fever (1999)
- Life (2000)
- Phantom Call (2000)
- True Love (2000)
- Fist Power (2000)
- A War Named Desire (2000)
- Bio-Cops (2000)
- Skyline Cruisers (2000)
- Gen-Y Cops (2000)
- Scaremonger (2001)
- Horror Hotline... Big Head Monster (2001)
- Final Romance (2001)
- Visible Secret (2001)
- Fing's Raver (2001)
- A Gambler's Story (2001)
- 2002 (2001)
- Color of Pain (2002)
- U-Man (2002)
- The Stewardess (2002)
- Devil Face Angel Heart (2002)
- No Problem 2 (JAPAN 2002)
- Just One Look (2002)
- Ping Pong (JAPAN 2002)
- Possessed (2002)
- Deals with the Dark (2002)
- Troublesome Night 17 (2002)
- Love is Over (2003)
- The Trouble-Makers (2003)
- I want to get married (2003)
- Fate Fighter (2003)
- Dream and Desire (2003)
- We're Not the Worst (2003)
- Public Toilet (2003)
- Dragon Loaded 2003 (2003)
- Fatal Training Course (2003)
- A Wedding or a Funeral (2004)
- Enter the Phoenix (2004) (cameo)
- Osaka Wrestling Restaurant (2004)
- One Nite in Mongkok (2004)
- Super Model (2004)
- Gun Affinity (2004)
- Instant Marriage (2004)
- The Key to Destiny (2004)
- My Sweetie (2004) (cameo)
- Crazy N' The City (2005)
- Divergence (2005)
- Demonic Flash (2005)
- Dragon Reloaded (2005)
- b420 (2005)
- Feel It Say It... (2006)
- Dog Bite Dog (2006)
- Half Twin (2006)
- Two Stupid Eggs (2007)
- House of Mahjong (2007)
- Twins Mission (2007)
- Undercover (2007)
- The Longest Night in Shanghai (2007)
- Invisible Target (2007)
- The Fatality (2008)
- Sasori (2008)
- Scare 2 Die (2008)
- The Vampire Who Admires Me (2008)
- Coweb (2009)
- 72 Tenants of Prosperity (2010)
- The Loan Shark (2011)
- The Incredible Truth (2013)
- Cold Pupil (2013)
- Man of Tai Chi (2013)
- The Constable (2013)
- Hello Babies (2014)
- The Midnight After (2014)
- Golden Brother (2014)
- Wild City (2015)
- The Treasure (2015)
- Lost in Hong Kong (2015)
- The Leaker (2018)
- Still Human (2018)
- Kung Fu Monster (2018)
- A Home with a View (2019)
- The White Storm 2: Drug Lords (2019)
- A Witness Out of the Blue (2019)
- Time (2021)

=== Television ===
- Law 2002 (2002)
- The Monkey King: Quest for the Sutra (2002)
- Chinese Paladin (2005)
- Ghetto Justice (2011)
- Ghetto Justice II (2012)
- Paranormal Mind (2015)
- OCTB (2017)

=== Video games ===
- Yakuza 0 (2015) (Lao Gui)

== Awards and nominations ==
Year	Award	Category	Film	Result
1997	17th Hong Kong Film Awards	Best New Performer	Made in Hong Kong	Won
1997	34th Golden Horse Awards	Best Actor	Made in Hong Kong	Nominated
1998	18th Hong Kong Film Awards	Best Supporting Actor	The Longest Summer	Nominated
2006	43rd Golden Horse Awards	Best Actor	Dog Bite Dog	Nominated
2011	45th TVB Anniversary Awards	Best Supporting Actor	Ghetto Justice	Nominated
