= Gen-Y Cops =

2000 Hong Kong film by Benny Chan

- Film poster
- Traditional Chinese: 特警新人類2
- Jyutping: Dak6 Ging2 San1 Jan4 Leoi6 Ji6
- Directed by: Benny Chan
- Written by: Felix Chong; Chan Kiu-ying; Bey Logan
- Produced by: Thomas Chung; John Chong; Solon So; Benny Chan
- Starring: Edison Chen; Stephen Fung; Sam Lee; Paul Rudd
- Cinematography: Anthony Pun
- Edited by: Cheung Ka-fai
- Music by: Peter Kam
- Production company: Regent Entertainment
- Distributed by: Media Asia Distributions
- Release date: 14 December 2000
- Running time: 90 minutes
- Country: Hong Kong
- Languages: Cantonese; English
- Box office: HK$11.9 million

Gen-Y Cops is a 2000 Hong Kong science fiction action film directed by Benny Chan. The film stars Edison Chen, Stephen Fung and Sam Lee. The film is a sequel to the 1999 film Gen-X Cops.

== Plot ==
In Washington D.C., RS-1, a new government robot, is scheduled to make its debut at a convention in Hong Kong. Doctor Cameron gives the investors a demonstration of RS-1. However, a malfunction occurs during a test, and RS-1 begins to shoot at everyone. Agents Ross Tucker and Ian Curtis shoot at the control panel, stopping RS-1. The malfunction comes from a hack by Kurt, RS-1's designer, who was previously fired. Kurt plans to steal the robot and intends to get the help of rogue FBI agent Quincy.

After moving to Hong Kong, cops Match and Alien, (Note: First introduced in Gen-X Cops.) go undercover as weapons dealers to bust Edison, a missing officer. The duo eventually subdue a dealer and find a room with beaten-up victims. Alien mistakes a victim for Edison, who is actually in cahoots with the gang's leader. When Alien and Match learn that the gang running the operation has stolen the Hong Kong police entry for the robot convention, their cover is blown and Match, Alien, and Edison are forced to fight the gang and have them all arrested.

The next day at headquarters, the three cops join others in seeing Dr. Tang demonstrating the recovered Hong Kong robot. On the day of the convention, FBI agent Jane Quigley attempts a demonstration of the security system, which does not work. Edison receives a call from Kurt and meets him at Jumbo Restaurant.

Kurt drugs Edison with a hypnosis drug. Under the hypnosis, Edison steals RS-1. Kurt once again hacks into RS-1 and has it kill Doctor Cameron. Edison recovers and learns that he killed Quincy, who was actually trying to kill him. After seeing the dead Quincy, Ian fights Edison, who escapes and resorts to taking Jane as a hostage. After a standoff involving Match and Alien as well as the FBI, the two end up in Kurt's van, where Edison learns what had happened. He and Jane escape. Match and Alien learn that they will have to take the fall if Edison and RS-1cannot be recovered.

The next day, Edison remembers a man in a lobster suit during his hypnosis. He and Jane find the lobster man. However, they were both tracked by Match and Alien, as well as the FBI. Jane returns with the FBI, who start shooting at Edison, Match, and Alien. The lobster man helps Edison flee. Match and Alien end up in the hospital with the injured FBI agents.

Edison finds Kurt in an abandoned warehouse. Match and Alien track Edison, find RS-1, and wind up in the mix when they face Kurt's men. Kurt escapes again, but Match and Alien trap Edison, bring him to headquarters and are hailed as heroes.

However, they become convinced that Edison may be innocent as well. Aided by Oli, Match's techie girlfriend, and Peggy, a techie who has a crush on Alien, they tap into Edison's memory and learn where RS-1 may be found. Jane then agrees to help them out. They learn Kurt plans to sell RS-1 to an Arab terrorist, but as they bust the dealers and Kurt, Ross arrives. He is revealed to be involved in the scheme with Quincy. When the deal is finalized, Ian arrives. He had learned of Ross betraying everyone and put a tracking device on him. During the ensuing confrontation, Kurt escapes with RS-1, and the terrorist is killed. Match eventually appears and helps Ian kill Ross.

Kurt unleashes RS-1 on the city, destroying anything in its path. Edison and Alien catch up to Kurt and RS-1 at the convention center, which results in that robot being destroyed. However, Dr. Tang installs a virus to be transferred from his robot to RS-1. When the virus is uploaded, RS-1 destroys Tang's robot. Kurt stands in victory, before the now virus-filled RS-1 guns down Kurt to his death. With the virus came a self-destruct button. Ian arrives by car, and the trio of officers wrap a chain around RS-1. The four cops drive to the harbor and send RS-1 into the water, where it explodes.

== Cast ==
- Edison Chen as Edison
- Stephen Fung as Match Yeung
- Sam Lee as Alien Lee
- Richard Sun as Kurt
- Paul Rudd as Ian Curtis
- Maggie Q as Jane Quigley
- Christy Chung as Inspector Chung
- Mark Hicks as Ross Tucker
- Vincent Kok as Lee Wah
- Cheung Tat-ming as Lymon
- Anthony Wong as Dr. Tang
- Eric Kot as Dr. Lai Shung-fung
- Ricardo Mamood as Quincy
- Reuben Langdon as Mike
- Ron Smoorenburg as Cage Fighter

== Production ==
The film was produced by Regent Entertainment and Media Asia Films. Nicholas Tse was originally set to return as Jack, the leader of the Gen-X Cops, but was unable due to a schedule conflict. Newcomer Edison Chen, a Canadian-born Chinese actor and rapper, was hired as Tse's replacement in brand new character Edison. Stephen Fung and Sam Lee signed on to return to the roles of Match and Alien. Paul Rudd made his Hong Kong film debut as FBI agent Ian Curtis.

As one reviewer described the origin of the American version of the sequel to Gen-X Cops,

Metal Mayhem is the Americanized version of a Hong Kong film called Gen-Y Cops (sequel to the aptly named smash hit Gen-X Cops). It's unclear how the "Jackie Chan presents" label was justified, since he doesn't appear to have anything to do with the film. However, the label is an effective way to let American audiences know up front what kind of movie they're getting themselves into.

== Release and reception ==
The film was theatrically released on 14 December 2000 in Hong Kong, while in the United States, the film was released as a Syfy Original Film premiering on the Syfy channel under the title Jackie Chan Presents: Metal Mayhem on 23 February 2002. During its theatrical run in Hong Kong from 14 December 2000 to 18 January 2001, the film grossed a total of HK$11,912,461.

Reviewing for the Malaysian newspaper the New Straits Times, a critic wrote that the film is "Ideal for idle, oops, idol worshipping youngsters looking for the latest trendy actors and actresses to fill up the bedroom walls".
