= Rave Fever =

1999 Hong Kong film by Alan Mak

- Film poster
- Chinese: 周末狂熱
- Directed by: Alan Mak
- Screenplay by: Susan Chan; Ip Po Ki
- Produced by: David Chan
- Starring: YoYo Mung; Mark Lui
- Edited by: Cheung Ka-fai
- Music by: Mark Lui
- Production company: Best Creation International
- Distributed by: Golden Harvest Company
- Release date: 23 December 1999
- Running time: 75 minutes
- Country: Hong Kong
- Languages: Cantonese; English
- Box office: HK$1,824,000

Rave Fever (Chinese: 周末狂熱; pinyin: Zhou mo kuang re), also known as X'Mas Rave Fever or X-Mas Rave Fever) is a 1999 Hong Kong comedy film directed by Alan Mak starring Cantopop composer Mark Lui, who was also responsible for much of the film's music. It is a Christmas film that was released theatrically in Hong Kong on 23 December 1999 for the Christmas season.

== Plot ==
Don (played by Cantopop composer Mark Lui) is a harried yuppie living in Hong Kong who has a one-night stand with a mysterious woman named Sonia. The next morning Sonia disappears but leaves her filofax in Don's possession. He attempts to retrace his steps from the previous night and encounters Nicole (played Jaymee Ong), a sexually liberated but potentially untrustworthy woman who may or may not have known Sonia. The filofax ends up in the hands of the journalist Ashley (played by YoYo Mung), who falls for the handsome yet troubled Steven (played by Terence Yin), who is revealed to be Sonia's former lover. Ashley begins to suspect that Sonia may have been the victim of foul play and her suspicions point her toward the peculiar club patron Gordon (played by Sam Lee).

== Cast ==
- Mark Lui as Don Fung
- Terence Yin as Stephen
- Jaymee Ong as Nicole Ko
- Sam Lee as Gordon
- YoYo Mung as Ashley
- Bey Logan as Inspector Ryan
- Wah Sun Ng as Gordon's employer

== Release ==
The film was released theatrically in Hong Kong on 23 December 1999. It was later presented in competition at the 2000 Stockholm Film Festival.
The film is rated R (Restricted).

== Box office ==
The film earned HK$1,824,000 at the Hong Kong box office.

== Reception and analysis ==
Author Gina Marchetti writes that with Rave Fever Alan Mak "experimented with elliptical narratives reminiscent of Hong Kong New Wave films".

In his book Planet Hong Kong: Popular Cinema and the Art of Entertainment, author David Bordwell calls the film "an experiment in Gen-X network narrative" involving "tracing crisscrossing love affairs".

The website lovehkfilm.com calls Rave Fever "Hong Kong's version of Go" and ultimately declares that "Rave Fever is nothing more than a candy-coated confection set against a sexy, neon-lit backdrop."

In his book Poetics of Cinema, author David Bordwell likewise notes a similarity between the American and Hong Kong films, writing, "Go (1999) and Rave Fever (1999) echo the network approach by reiterating events seen from different characters' angles and by expanding the roles assigned to bit players. Rave Fever also uses a circulating filofax to connect its party animals."

The website brns.com gave the film a rating of 7.5/10, writing, "This is not a sexy, highly charged exploration of the HK rave scene at all – but in fact a fairly subdued but very amusing comedy. It’s a comedy almost disguised within the veneer of a mystery – but as the mystery plays out almost like a shaggy dog story – the comedic aspects of the film become quite clever, very funny and have some wonderfully absurd moments."

Three reviewers on the website cityonfire.com gave the film positive ratings of 8.5/10, 7/10, and 8/10.
