= HK Film Blog =

Hong Kong film website

- Official logo
- Website type: Film, box office revenue
- Available in: Traditional Chinese
- Headquarters: Hong Kong
- Creator: Ryan Ra
- Website: www.hkfilmblog.com
- Commercial: Non-profit
- Launched: 12 May 2007; 19 years ago
- Current status: Active

HK Film Blog (Chinese: 講。鏟。片) is a Hong Kong website dedicated to reporting news within the film industry, publishing film reviews, and providing box office data. The site was established in 2007 and is currently operated by its founder Ryan Ra.

== History ==
HK Film Blog was founded on 12 May 2007 by Ryan Ra and Sam. Ra held a full-time job unrelated to film and started the website purely out of enthusiasm for Hong Kong cinema. He primarily writes film reviews and reports on box office revenue for Hong Kong films, and to "maintain independence and a neutral attitude" in his reports, he has declined sponsorships and collaborations with film companies. Sam mainly handles photography for the website, attending film premieres and events to take images. According to cultural critic Felix Chan, Ra has been the main operator of the site by 2011.

In June 2016, actor-director Chapman To published an opinion piece titled "'Local' is Not a Diamond Armor"(「本土」不是金剛盔甲) on HK Film Blog, which criticized the inconsistent quality of Hong Kong films and the unhealthy approach of filmmakers claiming to represent local identity to attract audiences into cinemas. In August 2017, Ra served as a jury member at the 1st Festival de Cannot, a local film festival dedicated to short tragedy films, alongside filmmakers Derek Kwok and Heiward Mak. In March 2021, HK Film Blog reported on the closure of UA Cinemas, citing exclusive sources that UA had already furloughed staff and that some film distributors had not received their share of box office revenues since mid-2020.

In January 2026, the Hong Kong Theatres Association and the Hong Kong Motion Picture Industry Association publicly criticized HK Film Blog for reporting on Hong Kong cinema box office revenues, stating that they had already collected evidence and planned to pursue legal action against the website to "protect and respect industry privacy". The Theatres Association and the Motion Picture Industry Association had formed Hong Kong Box Office Limited in 2013, a company that releases box office data to subscribers. It is alleged that there were users who leaked login credentials to HK Film Blog, and the website had disclosed information protected under privacy laws. Liberty Times reported that the announcement against HK Film Blog faced backlash online.

== Reception ==
Filmmaker Derek Kwok praised the reviews of HK Film Blog as "the most representative in Hong Kong", describing their insights as unique and highlighting the founders' passion for Hong Kong cinema that is free from monetary pursuits, a quality he claims "deserves his utmost respect". Filmmaker Law Chi-leung also expressed admiration for the dedication of the website's founders, emphasizing the significance of the site in filling the gap left by City Entertainment Magazine after its closure to provide free industry news and data for the audience.
