= Dry (group) =

Hong Kong musical group

- Born: Hong Kong
- Years active: 1997 - 1998
- Musical career
- Origin: Hong Kong
- Genres: Cantopop
- Label: Universal Music
- Past members: Stephen Fung, Mark Lui

Dry is a Cantopop music duo that formed between 1997 and 1998 with Mark Lui (Chinese: 雷頌德) and Stephen Fung (Chinese: 馮德倫) as bandmates. The group was formed when Mark decided to create a band with himself and another person. After meeting Stephen through friends' introductions, they agreed to start a music duo with Universal Music. A year after they formed, they decided to part ways to pursue different career paths. Mark continued as a songwriter to many cantopop artists such as Leon Lai and Miriam Yeung. While Stephen started his career in acting and later shifted toward directing and producing Hong Kong films, such as Enter the Phoenix.

Even though the group only lasted about a year, they have produced 3 studio albums and one compilation album.

== Discography ==
Album #	Album Information
1st	Dry One: Released: 1997; Label: Universal Music
2nd	Dry Two: Release Date: 1998; Label: Universal Music
3rd	Dry Free: Release Date: October 1, 1998; Label: Universal Music
4th	Dry & Friends Music Is Alive: Release Date: November 1, 1998; Label: Universal Music

== Awards ==
Year	Ceremony	Award	Result	Ref
1997	1997 Jade Solid Gold Top 10 Awards	Best Newcomer	Bronze Award	
