= A War Named Desire =

2000 Hong Kong film by Alan Mak

- Film poster
- Traditional Chinese: 愛與誠
- Simplified Chinese: 爱与诚
- Hanyu Pinyin: Ài Yǔ Chéng
- Jyutping: Ngoi3 Jyu5 Sing4
- Directed by: Alan Mak
- Screenplay by: Joe Ma; Alan Mak; Clement Cheng
- Produced by: Joe Ma
- Starring: Francis Ng; Daniel Chan; Dave Wang; Gigi Leung; David Lee; Sam Lee; Pace Wu
- Cinematography: Chan Chi-ying
- Edited by: Cheung Ka-fai
- Music by: Mark Lui
- Production companies: Mei Ah Film Production; Brilliant Idea Group
- Distributed by: Mei Ah Entertainment
- Release date: 9 September 2000
- Running time: 105 minutes
- Country: Hong Kong
- Language: Cantonese
- Box office: HK$2,269,655

A War Named Desire is a 2000 Hong Kong action film co-written and directed by Alan Mak and starring Francis Ng, Daniel Chan, Pace Wu, Sam Lee, David Lee, Dave Wang and Gigi Leung.

== Plot ==
Charles (Francis Ng) and James (Daniel Chan) are two brothers who lived with their grandmother during childhood. When Charles was eight years old, he committed an unexpected and unforgivable mistake, where he took HK$50,000 of cash from his grandmother's home and disappeared afterwards. James has held the grudge on his elder brother for his departure, not only for the fact that he took their grandmother's money, but mainly due to fact that his brother abandoned him without notice.

As the years go by, James has grown up and has met a good girlfriend, Jess (Pace Wu), while on the other hand, James became a member of a triad gang in Thailand, and is dating his triad brother, York's (Dave Wang) sister, Snow (Gigi Leung). After his grandmother dies, James finally have the opportunity to face down his past demon and he travels to Thailand with Jess to look for his brother.

== Cast ==
- Francis Ng as Charles Fong
- Daniel Chan as James Fong
- Dave Wang as York
- Gigi Leung as Snow
- David Lee as Henry Hung
- Sam Lee as Keith
- Pace Wu as Jess
- Grace Lam as Chan Pui-sze
- Chan Yiu-ming as Master Sun
- Zhou Shu-yuan as Master King
- Wasun Sakulponh as King's bodyguard
- Venna Rujirosakul as Ken
- Anusak Mekseree as Ming
- Vassana Namund as Keith's dancer girlfriend
- Archara Khantadat as Keith's dancer girlfriend
- Wong Wai-fai as Thug
- Keung Hak-shing as Thug

== Theme song ==
- I Miss Her (我想她)
  - Composer: China Huang
  - Lyricist: Wu Hsiung
  - Singer: Dave Wang

== Reception ==
=== Critical ===
LoveHKFilm gave the film a positive review praising the performances of Francis Ng and Gigi Leung, and director Alan Mak for allowing each character to have their own moments. So Good Reviews also gave the film a positive review, praising Mak's ability to accomplish visual storytelling, the cinematography by Chan Chi-ying, Nicky Li's action chorography and Ng's subtle performance.

=== Box office ===
The film grossed HK$2,269,655 at the Hong Kong box office during its theatrical run from 9 to 27 April 2000.

== Accolades ==
Accolades
| Ceremony | Category | Recipient | Outcome |
|---|---|---|---|
| 20th Hong Kong Film Awards | Best Supporting Actress | Gigi Leung | Nominated |
| 37th Golden Horse Awards | Best Original Film Song | Song: I Miss Her (我想她) Composer: China Huang; Lyricist: Wu Hsiung; Singer: Dave Wong | Nominated |
