= Stephen Fung =

Hong Kong actor, singer, and filmmaker (born 1974)

- 馮德倫
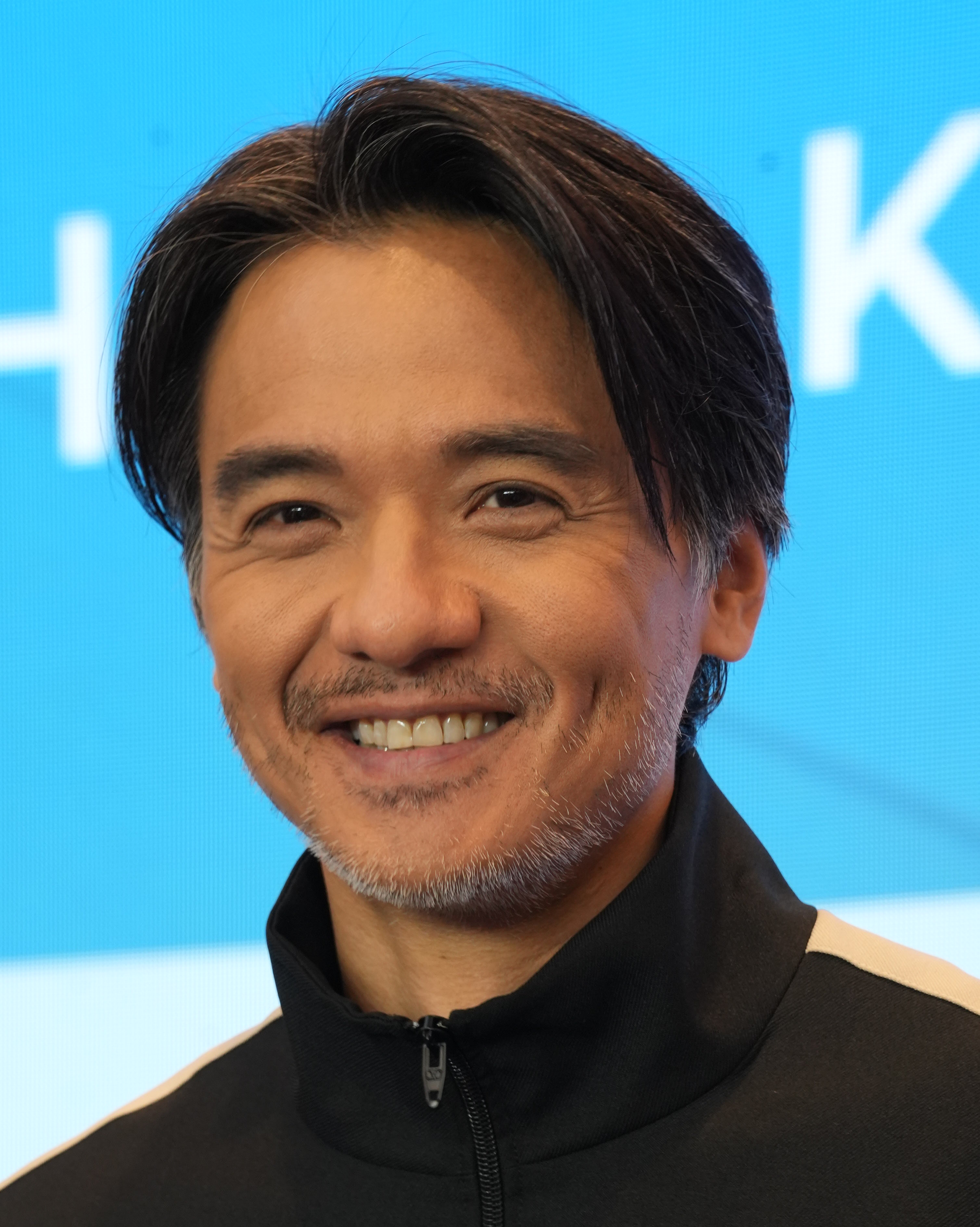
- Fung at 2026 Shanghai International Film Festival
- Born: Fung Chun-choi; 9 August 1974 (age 52); British Hong Kong
- Education: German Swiss International School; University of Michigan
- Occupations: Actor; singer; director; producer
- Years active: 1990–present
- Spouse: Shu Qi (m. 2016)
- Mother: Julie Sek Yin

Chinese name
- Traditional Chinese: 馮德倫
- Simplified Chinese: 冯德伦
Transcriptions
Standard Mandarin
- Hanyu Pinyin: Féng dé lún
Yue: Cantonese
- Jyutping: Fung4 Dak1 Leon4

Fung Chun-choi (born 9 August 1974), known professionally as Stephen Fung Tak-lun, is a Hong Kong actor, singer, and filmmaker.

== Biography ==
Fung Tak-lun was born in Hong Kong and studied at German Swiss International School. He is a graduate of the University of Michigan, where he studied graphic design.

Fung made his acting debut in Forbidden Nights (1990), portraying a young Chinese academic Liang Hong. Since then he has starred in more than 40 films and become a household name in China. In 2004, Fung wrote, directed, and starred in his feature film directorial debut, Enter the Phoenix, for Jackie Chan's newly formed company JCE Movies Limited; it became an instant hit. His second directing and starring feature, House of Fury, Fung's first collaboration with legendary action director Yuen Woo-ping, proved to be a success. House of Fury was the opening selection for the Hong Kong International Film Festival 2005, official selection for the 18th Tokyo International Film Festival, and the highest grossing Hong Kong film for the first half of 2005.

Besides continuing with his acting career, Fung directed Jump, written and produced by Stephen Chow for Sony Columbia Pictures Asia. In 2012, Fung directed the first two installments, Tai Chi 0 and Tai Chi Hero, in the "Tai Chi Trilogy".

Fung served as executive producer, director and action director of the AMC original series Into the Badlands, which stars Daniel Wu, Nick Frost, Sarah Bolger, Marton Csokas. In 2017, The Adventurers, Fung's sixth film as director, was released. The movie stars Andy Lau, Jean Reno and Shu Qi.

Currently, Fung served as executive producer and director for the first two episodes of Wu Assassins for Netflix.

Fung's production company Film Magic Pictures invested in the new company Cool Style, which was an entertainment company set up by Media Asia and Louis Koo's One Cool Group in 2021. Cool Style's business scope includes artist management and related businesses aiming to cultivate new forces with abundant resources and platforms.

== Personal life ==
Fung's mother, Julie Sek Yin (石燕), was a famous actress during Shaw Brothers' golden era of dramatic films during the 1960s.

Fung married Taiwanese actress Shu Qi in September 2016. The two met on the set of the gay romance drama Bishonen in 1997, and dated for four years before marrying.

== Awards ==
- Stockholm Film Festival, Best Director Bronze Horse Award Nomination
- Hong Kong Film Awards, Best New Director Nomination 2005
- Channel V China, Best New Director Award, 2009
- Golden Melody Awards, Best Music Video Director Award, 2007

== Filmography ==
=== Films ===
==== Actor ====
- Forbidden Nights (1990)
- Summer Snow (1995)
- The Log (1996)
- He Comes from Planet K (1997)
- First Love Unlimited (1997)
- Cheap Killers (1998)
- Bishonen (1998)
- The Poet (1998)
- Metade Fumaca (1999)
- Gorgeous (1999)
- Gen-X Cops (1999)
- The Sunshine Cops (1999)
- Dragon Heat (2000)
- Twelve Nights (2000)
- Un Baiser Volé (2000)
- The Green Hope (TVB serial) (2000)
- Bio-Cops (2000)
- Gen-Y Cops (2000)
- My Schoolmate the Barbarian (2001)
- Healing Hearts (2001)
- La Brassiere (2001)
- Shadow (2001)
- The Avenging Fist (2001)
- 2002 (2001)
- Haunted Office (2002)
- Women from Mars (2002)
- The Irresistible Piggies (2002)
- Devil Face, Angel Heart (2002)
- Magic Kitchen (2004)
- Enter the Phoenix (2004)
- DragonBlade (2005) [voice only]
- House of Fury (2005)
- 49 Days (2006)
- The Heavenly Kings (2006)
- Heavenly Mission (2006)
- Agent J (2007)
- All About Women (2008)
- The Fantastic Water Babes (2010)
- Virtual Recall (2010)
- Lost in London (2012)
- Tai Chi 0 (2012)
- Tai Chi Hero (2012)
- Badges of Fury (2013)
- Amazing (2013)
- I Am Somebody (2015)

==== Writer ====
- Heroes in Love (2001) (My Beloved w/ Nicholas Tse)
- Enter the Phoenix (2004)
- House of Fury (2005)
- Jump (2009)

==== Director ====
- Heroes in Love (My Beloved w/ Nicholas Tse)
- Enter the Phoenix (2004)
- House of Fury (2005)
- Jump (2009)
- Tai Chi 0 (2012)
- Tai Chi Hero (2012)
- The Adventurers (2017)

==== Producer ====
- Tai Chi 0 (2012)
- Tai Chi Hero (2012)
- Control (2013)

=== TV series ===
==== Actor ====
- The Green Hope (2000)
- Healing Hearts (2000)
- Stephen's Diary (2006)
- Day Breaker (2022)
- See Her Again (2024)

==== Director ====
- Stephen's Diary (2006)
- Into the Badlands Season 2, Episodes 7, 8 (2017)
- Wu Assassins Season 1, Episodes 1, 2 (2019)

==== Writer ====
- Stephen's Diary (2006)

==== Executive producer ====
- Stephen's Diary (2006)
- Into the Badlands (2015)
- Wu Assassins (2019)

==== Action director ====
- Into the Badlands Season 1 (2015)
- Into the Badlands Season 3 (2017)

== Discography ==
=== Solo ===
Ai Bu Gou/Love Not Enough (Album) (1999)

Track Listing:

1. 我走走走
2. 愛不夠
3. 愛我2000
4. 愛情肥皂劇
5. 偷看
6. 恨我還想你
7. 門
8. 別來煩我
9. FALL IN LOVE
10. 問號

Gen-X Cops (Soundtrack) (1999)

Track Listing:

1. YOU CAN'T STOP ME (Cantonese)
2. XXXX
3. 非走不可 (Remix)
4. LET ME BLEED
5. CAN'T STOP ME (Mandarin)
6. TERROR FROM SUNRISE (Instrumental)
7. THE GEN-X RAVE (Instrumental)
8. BAPTISM OF FIRE (Instrumental)
9. THE FINAL JUMP (Instrumental)
10. THE ERUPTION (Instrumental)

4 Green Hopes (EP) (2000)

Track Listing:

1. 新鮮人~ Green Hope
2. 新鮮人~ Luv Theme Whisper
3. 新鮮人~ Taylor Mix
4. 新鮮人~ Wah Wah Green Hope Mix

=== DRY ===
Album #	Album Information
1st	Dry One: Release Date: 1997; Label: Universal Music
2nd	Dry Two: Release Date: 1998; Label: Universal Music
3rd	Dry Free: Release Date: October 1, 1998; Label: Universal Music
4th	Dry & Friends Music Is Alive: Release Date: November 1, 1998; Label: Universal Music

=== Contributions to other albums ===
Album Information	Tracks Contributed
The Prophecy (世紀預言): Artist: Nicholas Tse; Released: 2001; Label: EEP	11. "Without Me" (Music & Lyrics)
Me: Artist: Nicholas Tse; Released: 2002; Label: EEP	12. "Let Me Die" (Lyrics)
Love Me Or Not (愛我不愛): Artist: Kelly Chen; Released: 1998-12; Label: Go East	5. "North Pole Snow" (Duet with Kelly Chen)
