= 1997 Jade Solid Gold Best Ten Music Awards Presentation =

Hong Kong music awards ceremony

The 1997 Jade Solid Gold Best Ten Music Awards Presentation (Chinese: 1997年度十大勁歌金曲頒獎典禮) was held in January 1998. It is part of the Jade Solid Gold Best Ten Music Awards Presentation series held in Hong Kong.

== Top 10 song awards ==
The top 10 songs (十大勁歌金曲) of 1997 are as follows.

Song name in Chinese	Artist
只要為我愛一天	Leon Lai
歡樂今宵	Leo Ku
星夢情真	Kelly Chen
愛的呼喚	Aaron Kwok
我有我天地	Cass Phang
愛是永恆	Jacky Cheung
好朋友	Edmond Leung
親密關係	Sammi Cheung
我的天、我的歌	Andy Hui
真生命	Andy Lau

== Additional awards ==
Award	Song (if available for award)	Recipient
Most popular Mandarin song (最受歡迎國語歌曲獎)	中國人	(gold) Andy Lau
-	原來什麼都不要	(silver) A-mei
-	你快樂(所以我快樂)	(bronze) Faye Wong
Outstanding performance award (傑出表現獎)	-	(gold) Kit Chan
-	-	(silver) Mavis Hee
-	-	(bronze) Gigi Leung, Miriam Yeung
The best compositions (最佳作曲獎)	歡樂今宵	Dennie Wong (黃丹儀), performed by Leo Ku
The best lyrics (最佳填詞獎)	再見二丁目	Albert Leung, performed by Miriam Yeung
The best music arrangement (最佳編曲獎)	難兄難弟	Lincoln Lo (羅堅), performed by Gallen Lo, Francis Ng, Maggie Cheung, Jessica Hsuan
The best song producer (最佳歌曲監製獎)	歡樂今宵	Chan Tak Kin (陳德建), performed by Leo Ku
Four channel award (四台聯頒傳媒大獎)	-	Mark Lui, Albert Leung, performed by Jacky Cheung
The most popular new artist (最受歡迎新人獎)	-	(gold) Nicholas Tse
-	-	(silver) A-mei
-	-	(bronze) Dry
The most popular commercial song (最受歡迎廣告歌曲獎)	愛的呼喚	(gold) Aaron Kwok
-	全城效應	(silver) Ekin Cheng
-	在乎你感受	(bronze) Daniel Chan
The best music video (最佳音樂錄影帶獎)	人若然忘記了愛	Chong Siu Wing (莊少榮), performed by Ronald Cheng
The most popular male artist (最受歡迎男歌星獎)	-	Aaron Kwok
The most popular female artist (最受歡迎女歌星獎)	-	Sammi Cheng
Asian Pacific most popular Hong Kong male artist (亞太區最受歡迎香港男歌星獎)	-	Jacky Cheung
Asian Pacific most popular Hong Kong female artist (亞太區最受歡迎香港女歌星獎)	-	Faye Wong
Gold song gold award (金曲金獎)	只要為我愛一天	Leon Lai
Community chest charity award (公益金慈善金曲大獎)	親情	Leon Lai
