= Bishōnen (disambiguation) =

A bishōnen is an ideally beautiful young man often seen in anime and manga

Bishōnen may also refer to:

- Bishonen (film), a film about homosexual love
- Bishonen (song), a song by Momus (artist)
- Bishonen Yonfan, a director
- Bishōnen (series), a novel series
