= Xinran =

British-Chinese journalist

Xuē Xīnrán 薛欣然
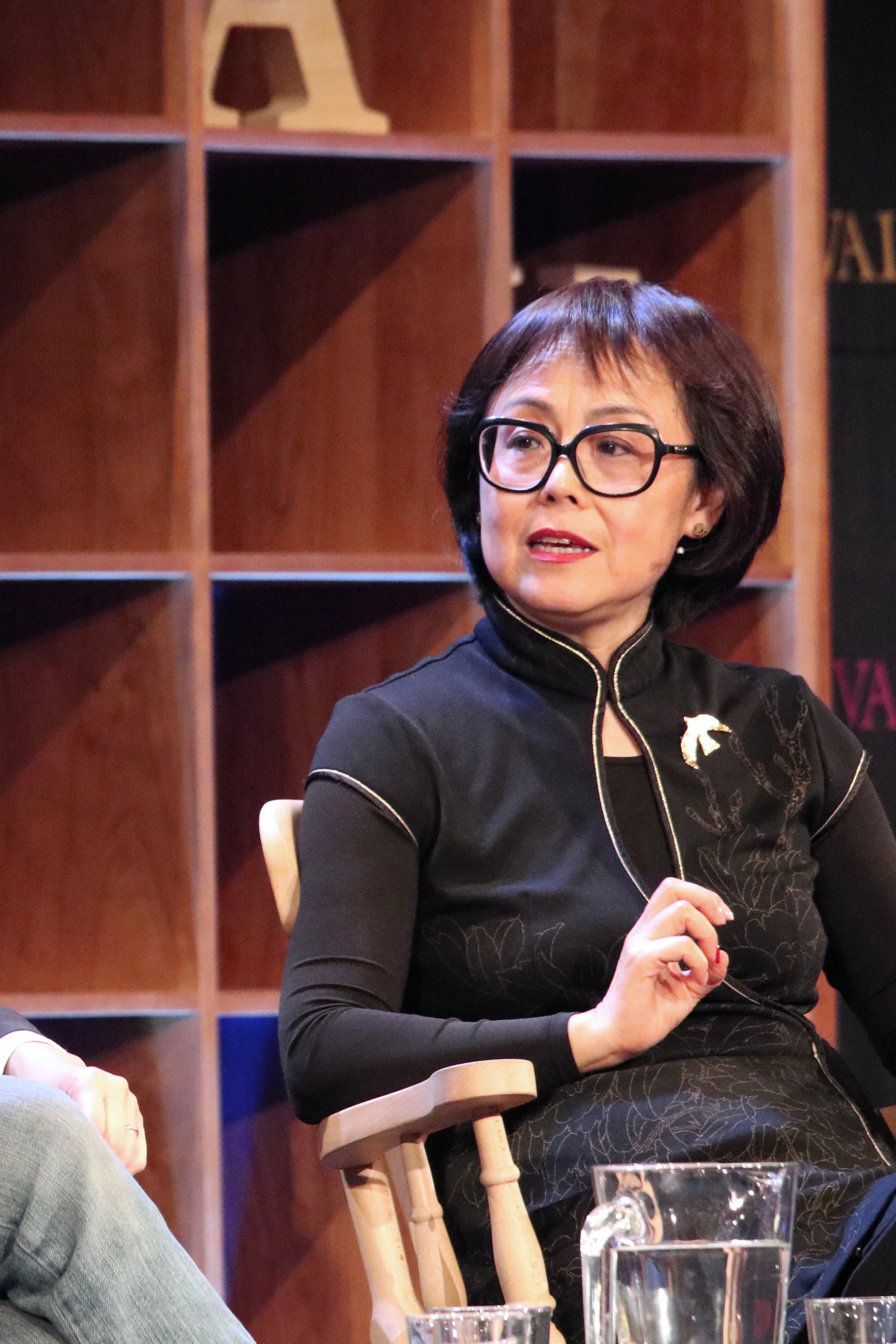
- Xinran in 2016
- Born: 1958 (age 67–68); Beijing, China
- Education: First Military University of People's Liberation Army
- Occupations: journalist writer radio presenter speaker advocate
- Spouse: Toby Eady (died 2017)
- Writing career
- Pen name: Xinran

Xinran
- Traditional Chinese: 薛欣然
- Simplified Chinese: 薛欣然
Transcriptions
Standard Mandarin
- Hanyu Pinyin: Xuē Xīnrán
- Wade–Giles: Hsueh Hsin-Jan

Xuē Xīnrán (薛欣然, pen name Xinran, born in Beijing in 1958) is a British-Chinese journalist, author, speaker, and advocate for women's issues. She was a popular radio personality in China with a call-in program named "Words on the Night Breeze" from 1989 to 1997. The program focused on women's issues and life stories. She was well known for travelling extensively in China to interview women for her work. In 1997, she moved to London and began writing stories of the women she met along her journeys. Her first book, The Good Women of China, was published in 2002, becoming an international bestseller. She frequently contributes to The Guardian and the BBC.

== Education ==
First Military University of People's Liberation Army, 1983–1987; English and International Relations

== Personal life ==
Xinran was born into a wealthy and privileged family on 19 July 1958. She was raised by her grandparents due to her parents' imprisonment during China's cultural revolution. She has said that her first memory was of the Red Guards setting her home on fire when she was 6 years old.

Xinran was married, while working as an army administrator, and has one son, Panpan, who was born in 1988. She later divorced. She moved to London in 1997 and married British literary agent Toby Eady (son of Mary Wesley) in 2002.

== Books ==
The Good Women of China, was published in 2002 and related many of the stories she heard on her radio show. It has since been translated into over thirty languages.

Sky Burial, Xinran’s second book, was published in 2004. It told the incredible true story of Shu Wen, whose husband joined the Chinese army only a few months after their marriage in the 1950s, and was sent to Tibet to try and unify the two cultures.

What the Chinese Don't Eat, a collection of Xinran’s Guardian columns from 2003 to 2005, was published in 2006. It covers a vast range of topics, from food to sex education, from the experiences of British mothers who have adopted Chinese daughters to whether Chinese people do Christmas shopping.

Miss Chopsticks, Xinran’s first novel, was published in July 2007. It explores the uneasy relationship between Chinese migrant workers and the cities they flock to, and how the country’s economic reforms have changed the role of so-called ‘chopstick girls’. Once considered disposable, they now take city jobs as waitresses, masseuses, factory line workers and cleaners, and bring bundles of cash home. This earns them respect in their patriarchal villages, as well as the respect and hearts of city dwellers.

China Witness, Xinran’s fifth book, was published in October 2008. It is based on twenty years’ worth of interviews she conducted with the last two generations in China. She hopes it will ‘restore a real modern history of China, from real people after most historical evidence was destroyed in the Culture Revolution’.

Message from an Unknown Chinese Mother, Xinran’s Sixth book, was published in 2010. It is a collection of heartbreaking stories from Chinese mothers who have lost their children, or been forced to abandon them.

Buy Me the Sky, Xinran’s seventh book, contains stories from the first generation of China’s one child policy. It was published in the UK in May 2015, and in other countries in 2016.

The Promise, Xinran’s eighth book, was published in 2019. The story tells the romantic journeys of four generations within one Chinese family, spanning a century marked by profound social change. It is dedicated to the Xinran’s beloved husband Toby Eady, the renowned literary agent, who succumbed to bladder cancer on 24 December 2017, after a brave three-year battle.

Still Hot a collection of surprising, affecting, funny and emotional stories about forty-two women, including Xinran, who share their very personal stories of the menopause. It was published in 2020.

Barefoot Books Water is a collection of stories, published in 2021, told by a friendly water droplet, guiding children through topics ranging from melting and freezing to the ways in which water literally shapes the Earth. These stories are told by storytellers from around the world, including Xinran.

The Book of Secrets, Xinran’s ninth book, was published by Bloomsbury in February 2024. It tells the incredible story of a Chinese man through the secret letters he left to his wife and daughter, providing unique insight into the history of war, love, deceit, betrayal and political intrigue in China over the past century.

China Adorned was first conceived by Toby Eady in 2009. From 2009 to 2014, Xinran and Toby led a team in seeking out an author and a photographer with the necessary expertise and experience. In 2018, Chinese anthropologist Deng Qiyao became attached to the project and began writing the text, which was translated into English by Will Spence and Fan Wu. From 2019-2022, the book was brought together and designed by publishers Thames & Hudson in Australia/UK and Yilin Press in China, with Xinran serving as Executive Editor. The book, the first ever Chinese-English bilingual picture book on Chinese ethnic minorities, was published in 2022.

== Other ==
In August 2004 Xinran set up ‘The Mothers’ Bridge of Love’ (MBL). MBL reaches out to Chinese children in all corners of the world; by creating a bridge of understanding between China and the West and between adoptive culture and birth culture, MBL ultimately wants to help bridge the huge poverty gap which still exists in many parts of China. The MBL book for adoptive families, Mother's Bridge of Love, came third in TIME magazine’s list of the top ten children’s books of 2007.

Xinran often advises western media (including BBC and Sky) about western relations with China, and makes frequent television and radio appearances. She is a member of the Advisory Board of the Asia House Festival of Asian Literature.

== Bibliography ==
- The Good Women of China: Hidden Voices. Vintage, 2003, ISBN 978-0-09-944078-9.
- Sky Burial. Chatto & Windus, 2004. ISBN 978-0-7011-7622-8 (hardback) / ISBN 978-0-09-946193-7 (paperback).
- What the Chinese Don't Eat. Vintage, 2006. ISBN 978-0-09-950152-7.
- Miss Chopsticks. Vintage, 2008. ISBN 978-0-09-950153-4.
- China Witness: Voices from a Silent Generation. Chatto & Windus, 2008. ISBN 978-0-7011-8039-3.
- Message from an Unknown Chinese Mother. Chatto & Windus, 2010. ISBN 978-0-7011-8402-5.
- Buy Me the Sky, The Remarkable Truth of China's One-Child Generations Rider, 2015, ISBN 978-1-8460-4471-7.
- The Promise: Love and Loss in Modern China, I.B. Tauris, 2018, ISBN 1788313623
- The Book of Secrets: A Personal History of Betrayal in Red China. Bloomsbury, 2024, ISBN 9781399406697
