= The Good Women of China =

Book by Xue Xinran

- First edition
- Author: Xue Xinran
- Language: English
- Genre: Non-fiction
- Publisher: Chatto & Windus
- Publication date: 2002
- ISBN: 0-701-17345-9

The Good Women of China (ISBN 0-701-17345-9) is a book published in 2002. The author, Xue Xinran, is a British-Chinese journalist who currently resides in London and writes for The Guardian. Esther Tyldesley translated this book from Chinese.

The Good Women of China is primarily composed of interviews Xinran conducted during her time as a radio broadcaster in China in the 1980s. However, she also details some of her own experiences as a woman in China. The interviews usually focus on the embedded cultural perceptions in China about women's rights, roles, and suffering. Many of these interviews were drawn from the call-in portion of Xinran' widely popular radio program, Words on the Night Breeze. She also interviewed other women, whom she sought out for their experiences as Chinese women or opinions about the status of Chinese women.

This book attacked key issues such as infanticide, son-preference, suppression of sexuality, homosexuality, and the sexism embedded in culture and society. For this reason, Xinran had to leave China in order to write the book, which was published in Britain.

Though the author herself has some opinions about women, whose inherent differences she describes throughout the book, she acknowledges and confronts the stereotypes about women which she detailed in some of the life experiences of Chinese women she recounted. Many women's stories involved rape, forced marriage, deception, and abuse at the hands of authority figures in society and the government. All of these men gained their power over women from pre-existing cultural practices and furthered their control through the existing power structures.

In The Good Women of China, Xinran sheds light both on the persistence of oppression of women in China as well as the new opportunities for women in modern Chinese society. Drawn mainly from anecdotes and interviews, and sparsely substantiated by historical facts and statistics, this book takes on important issues without resorting to a black-and-white view of the situation.
