= Helen To =

Hong Kong television host and producer

Helen To 杜如風
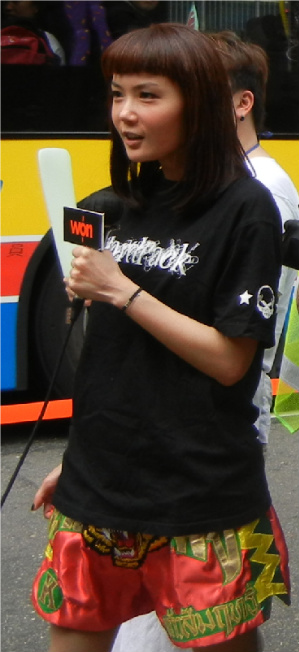
- Education: McMaster University; Ochanomizu University

Helen To Yu-fung (Chinese: 杜如風), is a Hong Kong host, TV producer and columnist.

== Summary ==
To father is the late To Wai-tung (pen name Ah-To), former publicity manager of Golden Harvest Films. Her mother, Lo Pui-ching, is a retired teacher from Gertrude Simon Lutheran College. She attended North Point Methodist Primary School in primary school and was also good at roller skating at that time. She studied at Shau Kei Wan Government Secondary School. After obtaining her university diploma in 1998, her father recommended To to Emperor Motion Pictures to work as a subtitle translator for Japanese films, and she became an apprentice screenwriter later. In 2005, she applied for a job as a travel program writer for Cable TV and produced the program "Life is Tasty". She has participated in the script writing of the movie Enter The Phoenix.

To once dated Hong Kong singer Wong You-nam in 2007, but the relationship ended after a year.
