= First Love Unlimited =

1997 Hong Kong film by Joe Ma

- Film poster
- 初恋无限Touch; Chu lian wu xian Touch
- Directed by: Joe Ma
- Written by: Joe Ma
- Produced by: Shu Kei
- Starring: Daniel Chan; Gigi Leung; Stephen Fung
- Cinematography: Cheung Man-Po
- Edited by: Eric Kwong
- Music by: Kenneth Fong Shu-Leung; Mark Lui
- Distributed by: Cameron Entertainment Co., Ltd. (Hong Kong)
- Release date: 27 March 1997 (Hong Kong)
- Running time: 92 minutes
- Country: Hong Kong
- Language: Cantonese

First Love Unlimited (Chinese: 初恋无限Touch; pinyin: Chu lian wu xian Touch) is a 1997 Hong Kong romantic comedy film directed by Joe Ma and starring Daniel Chan, Gigi Leung, and Stephen Fung.

== Synopsis ==
Raised in a housing project, Shum Chi Hong (Daniel Chan) meets a daughter of a wealthy family, Ah Tap (Gigi Leung). They go to the movies for their first date but they buy wrong tickets. Although they were unable to see the movie, they hold hands for the first time. On the bus ride home, Tap sleeps on Hong's shoulder. Hong walks Tap to her door and they kiss goodbye as they reluctantly part.

At first, Hong lies about being low-born because he fears that Tap will never fall in love with him. Later, Tap's mother discovers the relationship and strongly opposes it.

== Cast ==
- Daniel Chan Hiu-Tung as Shum Chi Hong
- Gigi Leung Wing-Kei as Tap/Stephainie Wong
- Joyce Chan as Angie (Tap's friend)
- Stephen Fung Tak Lun as Chris
- Ricky Hui Kun Ying as Uncle Chicken Wing (Hong's father)
- Vincent Kok Tak Chiu as Fatty
- Matt Chow Hoi Kwong as Stephen
- Tina Lau as Mrs Tina Wong (Tap's mother)
- Wyman Wong Wai Man as Mimi (Hong's friend)
- Edward Yang as Tap's step-dad
- Lee Siu-Kei as Security at amusement park (Mimi's father)
- Erica Yuen Lai-Ming as Hong's sister
- Lam Ho-Yeung as restaurant customer
- Soi Cheang Pou-Soi as restaurant customer
- Joe Ma as Hong's audio equipment boss
- Andy Tsang Tak-Wah as La Salle student

== Soundtrack ==
The soundtrack of the film is sung by Daniel Chan and Gigi Leung.
