= The Adventurers (2017 film) =

2017 Hong Kong film by Stephen Fung

- Official film poster

Chinese name
- Traditional Chinese: 俠盜聯盟
- Simplified Chinese: 侠盗联盟
Transcriptions
Standard Mandarin
- Hanyu Pinyin: Xiá Dào Lián Méng
Yue: Cantonese
- Jyutping: Hap6 Dou6 Lyun4 Mang4
- Directed by: Stephen Fung
- Written by: Stephen Fung; Cheung Chi-kwong; Andy Lo; Steve Ha; Wong Hiu-chong
- Produced by: Andy Lau; Stephen Fung
- Starring: Andy Lau; Shu Qi; Zhang Jingchu; Tony Yang; Jean Reno
- Cinematography: Shane Hurlbut
- Edited by: Angie Lam; Joel Cox
- Music by: Tuomas Kantelinen
- Production companies: Infinitus Entertainment; Flagship Entertainment Group; Gravity Pictures Film Production; China Film Co.; Shanghai Alibaba Pictures; Media Asia Distribution (Beijing); Orient Imagine Entertainment; Mannix Pictures; Jebsen Culture; Milk and Honey Pictures
- Distributed by: China 3D Digital Entertainment; Intercontinental Film Distributors (Hong Kong); IM Global (International)
- Release dates: 11 August 2017 (Taiwan, China); 24 August 2017 (Hong Kong)
- Running time: 108 minutes
- Countries: Hong Kong; China; Czech Republic
- Languages: Cantonese; Mandarin; French; English
- Budget: RMB150 million
- Box office: US$37.38 million

The Adventurers is a 2017 Hong Kong action film written, produced, and directed by Stephen Fung, and it is also produced by and starring Andy Lau. The film co-stars Shu Qi, Zhang Jingchu, Tony Yang, and Jean Reno. The Adventurers tells the story of an ex-con/thief (Lau) who steals two priceless pieces of jewelry at the Cannes Film Festival.

== Plot ==
Infamous thief Dan Cheung miscalculated during a heist and was apprehended and imprisoned as a result. Five years later, Cheung enlists his longtime partner Po Chen and new recruit Red Ye to steal precious jewels in Europe under the watchful eyes of French detective, Pierre, who has been hot on Cheung's trail for many years.

After testing their skills and agility, Cheung finds the buyer of the jewels, King Kong, leader of a criminal organisation and a father figure to Cheung. After the two reunite, Cheung receives a new mission. At the same time, in order to bring Cheung and his gang to justice, Pierre persuades Cheung's ex-fiancée, Amber Li, who had developed hatred from love towards Cheung, to join the hunt.

From Cannes to Prague, a game of cat and mouse across Europe begins. After a series of close-combat melees, Pierre is able to gradually grasp Cheung's whereabouts. And as everyone is about to get close to the target, Cheung's true plan also gradually surfaces.

== Cast ==
- Andy Lau as Dan Cheung (張丹)
- Shu Qi as Red Ye (葉紅)
- Zhang Jingchu as Amber Li
- Tony Yang as Po Chen (陳小寶)
- Jean Reno as Detective Pierre Bissette (皮埃爾)
- Eric Tsang as King Kong (金剛)
- Sha Yi as Charlie Luo (查理·羅)
- You Tianyi as Tingting (婷婷)
- Zhang Yiqun as Lao Mo
- Karel Dobrý as Mr Yelyluk
- Aleksandr Tsoy as Mr. Yelyluk's translator

== Production ==
The Adventurers was originally slated to star Feng Shaofeng and Zhang Tianai. Although Feng had initially signed a contract, he withdrew from the project at last minute with leg injury claims. Zhang also pulled out for unknown reasons. While director Stephen Fung was struggling to find replacements to fill in the roles for the lead actor and actress, Andy Lau and Shu Qi both took the initiative to fill in the spots. In addition, Lau also serves as the film's producer, with Terence Chang serving as executive producer and Shane Hurlbut handling the film's cinematography.

Filming for The Adventurers began in July 2016 taking place in France before moving to the Czech Republic. With a production budget of RMB150 million (US$21.84 million), CZK200 million (US$8.2 million) was spent shooting in the Czech Republic. During the shooting of the film in Prague, director Fung and lead actress Shu were married on 3 September 2016. Production for The Adventurers officially wrapped up on 13 September 2016 in Prague.

== Release ==
The Adventurers was theatrically released on 11 August 2017 in Taiwan and China and in Hong Kong on 24 August 2017.

== Reception ==
=== Critical ===
The Adventurers received mixed reviews from critics. Andrew Parker of TheGATE.ca gave the film a score of 2.9 out of 5 praising the performances of Andy Lau and Shu Qi and the film, elaborate action scenes and stunning visuals, but notes the script's unevenness and ultimately states how the film "goes largely in one ear and out the other". Mark Jenkins of The Washington Post rated the film 2.4 out of 4 stars and praises director Stephen Fung's effort of endowing the film " with panache and speed" and "punctuates the action with humor". Simon Abrams of RogerEbert.com gave the film a score 2 out of 4 stars and refers it as a "sleepy globe-trotting adventure" that is "far too skimpy to be memorable." Boon Chan of The Straits Times gave the film a score of 2.5 out of 5 stars and criticizes its laughable dialogue and unsurprising plot. Edmund Lee of the South China Morning Post rated the film 2 out of 5 stars noting how "the heavyweight cast and exotic European locations are wasted on such a derivative story." Gabriel Chong of MovieXclusive.com gave the film a score of 3 out of 5 praising its cast, action sequences, but notes its unengaging plot and characters and refers the film as "breezy but forgettable escapist fun".

Elizabeth Kerr of The Hollywood Reporter criticized the film's lack of logic and uninteresting characters despite its charismatic cast, but praises its technical specs. Daniel Eagan of Film Journal International notes the film's poor scripting and lack of energy but praises the performance of Shu as the film's best element. Robert Abele of the Los Angeles Times criticizes director Fung for doing "a genuine superstar like Lau no favors by preventing his lead's natural charm from taking center stage" and the film's predictable twist.

== Box office ==
In Taipei, the film debuted No. 3 on its opening weekend where it grossed NT$3.33 million. During its second weekend, the film grossed NT$0.96 million and has grossed a total NT$5.99 million by then.

In China, the film premiered on 28 April 2017 and debuted No.1 during its opening weekend where it grossed ¥146,596,801. During its second weekend, the film grossed ¥$9,943,599 and has grossed a total ¥225,984,200 by then. On its third weekend, the film grossed ¥655,298, grossing a total ¥235,500,297 by then. During its fourth weekend, the film grossed ¥90,899 and has grossed ¥236,075,602 by then. On its fifth weekend, the film grossed ¥52,702 and has accumulated a total gross of ¥236,957,698 so far.

Opening on 24 August 2017 in Hong Kong, the film debuted No. 6 on its opening weekend where it grossed HK$2,351,161. During its second weekend, the film grossed HK$2,314,666 and moved up to No. 4, accumulating a total gross of HK$4,665,827 by then. On its third weekend, the film grossed HK$663,173 and has grossed a total of HK$5,329,000 so far.

== See also ==
- Andy Lau filmography
