= Geling Yan =

Chinese-American author and screenwriter (born 1958)

Yan Geling
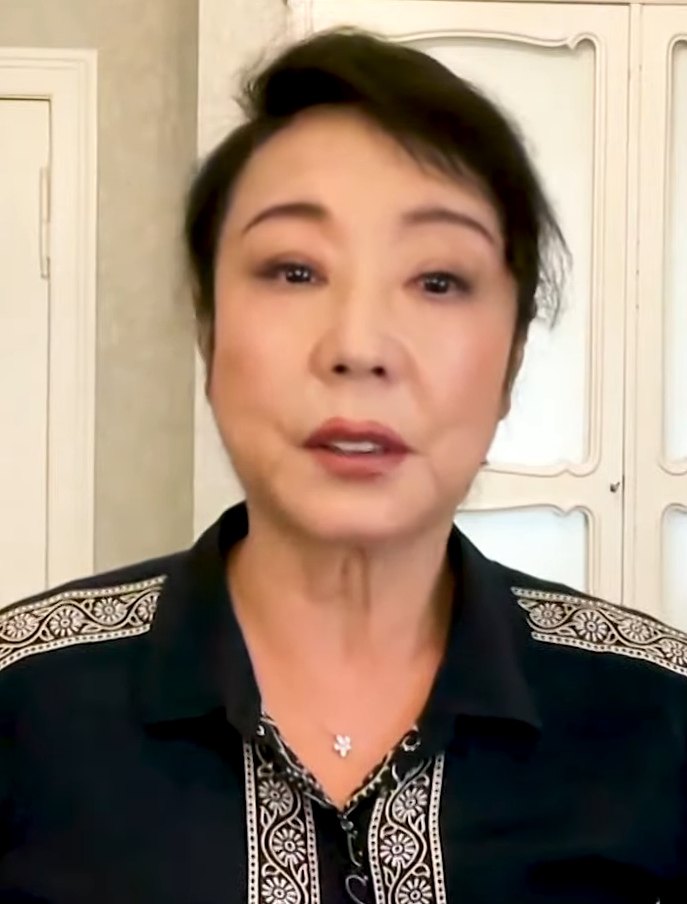
- Yan in 2023
- Born: 严歌苓; 16 November 1958 (age 67); Shanghai, China
- Education: Wuhan University; Columbia College Chicago
- Occupations: Novelist, screenwriter
- Spouse(s): Li Kewei (?-1990s); Lawrence Walker (1992-)
- Children: 1
- Writing career
- Notable work: A Woman's Epic

Geling Yan (simplified Chinese: 严歌苓; traditional Chinese: 嚴歌苓; pinyin: Yán Gēlíng; born January 27, 1959) is a Chinese-American author and screenwriter, known for her collaborations with major Chinese directors such as Zhang Yimou, Chen Kaige, and Feng Xiaogang. Since 2022, Yan has been blacklisted in China following her criticism of Chinese leader Xi Jinping.

== Early life ==
Yan was born in Shanghai, China in 1959 into a family of scholars and writers. She is the second child of Yan Dunxun and Jia Lin. She has an elder brother Yan Geping (严歌平). Her father is an alumnus of the College of Architecture and Urban Planning of Tongji University.

The Cultural Revolution broke out when Yan was seven. She witnessed the brutality of the movement first-hand, which became a "life time obsession" and a recurring theme in her works.

At the age of 12, Yan joined the People's Liberation Army as a ballet dancer in Chengdu, and travelled with the dance troupe around China including in Tibet. In 1979, she volunteered as a war correspondent in the Sino-Vietnamese War. She was discharged from the PLA with a rank equivalent to lieutenant colonel. She left China after the 1989 Tiananmen Square massacre and has since lived in the United States and Germany.

Yan holds a bachelor's degree in literature from Wuhan University, and a Master's in Fine Arts in Fiction Writing from Columbia College Chicago.

== Career ==
Yan published her first novel in 1985 during her military service at China. In the early 1990s, she went to the US and sharpened her writing skills at Columbia College, Chicago through a three year creative writing program. During and after her study, she continued to write in Chinese, publishing award-winning short stories, novellas, and novels in the U.S., Taiwan, and mainland China. She was considered by some scholars in mainland China and Taiwan as one of the most important Chinese-language authors in the United States.

As of 2023, Yan has published over 40 books and has won over 30 literary and film awards. Her works have been translated into twenty-one languages.

Yan views writing as a disciplined profession, approaching her novels with meticulous craftsmanship. To ensure her stories and characters remain grounded in reality, she self-funded extensive field research: living among locals, consulting primary witnesses, and even embedding herself in the gambling dens of Macau to ensure every character felt authentic.

=== Association ===
She is a member of the Hollywood Writers Guild of America, the Writer's Association of China, and the Academy of Motion Picture Arts and Sciences.

=== Reception ===
Yan is widely recognized for her fiction exploring the psychological legacy of the Cultural Revolution. Unlike earlier "scar literature" that focused on direct political protest, Yan's narratives emphasize individual trauma, gender dynamics, and the personal struggle for moral integrity. Her major works, such as the collection White Snake and Other Stories and the novel The Criminal Lu Yanshi (the basis for the film Coming Home), illustrate how political repression can distort human relationships and identity. By focusing on the lives of marginalized figures like women and intellectuals, Yan's writing serves as a "counter-narrative" to official state histories. While her work has gained international visibility through numerous film adaptations, critics often note that these cinematic versions tend to soften the sharper political critiques present in her original prose.

== Works ==
=== Novels in English ===
- The Lost Daughter of Happiness (tr. Cathy Silber, Chinese title Fusang 《扶桑》)
- The Banquet Bug (written in English, published as The Uninvited in the UK)
- The Flowers of War (tr. Nicky Harman, Chinese title Jinling shisan chai 《金陵十三钗》)
- Little Aunt Crane (tr. Esther Tyldesley, Chinese title Xiaoyi Duohe 《小姨多鶴》)
- The Secret Talker (tr. Jeremy Tiang, Chinese title Miyu zhe 《密语者》)
- Criminal Lu Yanshi (tr. Lawrence A. Walker, Chinese title Lu fan Yanshi《陆犯焉识》)

=== Novels in Chinese （Chronological order of publication） ===
- 绿血
- 一个女兵的悄悄话 (Yi ge nü bing di qiao qiao hua)
- 雌性的草地
- 草鞋权贵 (In 2009, the name was changed to Shuangjiang《霜降》)
- 扶桑 (The Lost Daughter of Happiness )
- 人寰 (In 2009, the name was changed to Xinli Yisheng Zaima 《心理医生在吗》）
- 无出路咖啡馆
- 花儿与少年
- 第九个寡妇（The Ninth Widow）
- 一个女人的史诗
- 小姨多鹤（Auntie Duohe）
- 寄居者
- 铁梨花
- 陆犯焉识 (he Criminal of Lu Yanshi, 2011)
- 金陵十三钗（The Flowers of War）
- 补玉山居
- 妈阁是座城（A City Called Macao）
- 老师好美
- 床畔
- 舞男
- 芳华（Youth）– English title: You Touched Me – (adapted into the eponymous movie)
- 666号
- 小站
- 蜃楼
- 米拉蒂 (Milati, 2023)

=== Short stories in English ===
- White Snake and Other Stories (tr. Lawrence A. Walker)
- The Landlady (tr. Lawrence A. Walker)
- Disappointing Returns (tr. David Haysom)

=== Screen adaptation ===
Several of Yan's works have been adapted for film, including Xiu Xiu: The Sent-Down Girl, which was directed by Joan Chen, and Siao Yu, directed by Sylvia Chang and screenplay co-written by Ang Lee.

Zhang Yimou, the Chinese director of To Live and Raise the Red Lantern adapted her novella 13 Flowers of Nanjing to the screen as The Flowers of War. His 2014 movie Coming Home and 2020 movie One Second were based on Yan's novel The Criminal Lu Yanshi.

Yan’s semi-autobiographical novel, You Touched Me, was adapted into the 2017 film Youth; the film was directed by Feng Xiaogang and scripted by Yan herself.

Yan has worked on other movie scripts including Forever Enthralled, a biographical film of Peking opera star Mei Lanfang directed by Chen Kaige.

== Censorship in China ==
Yan's friction with Beijing likely started after the 2014 film Coming Home boosted sale for her book The Criminal of Lu Yanshi, a story depicting the tragic fate of intellectuals during the political campaigns in post-1949 China. In late 2020, when Covid 19 broke out in Wuhan, Yan published an article titled "Hide, Hide, Hide" criticizing Beijing's cover-up that cost lives of many, including whistleblower Dr. Li Wenliang.

In February 2022, Yan was blacklisted in China after appearing on a YouTube chat hosted by Zhou Xiaozheng, a former associate professor of sociology at Renmin University. During the video chat, Yan criticized the Chinese government’s handling of the Xuzhou chained woman incident and echoed remarks by Zhou, who described Chinese leader Xi Jinping as a "human trafficker" for imposing large mandatory "donations" on foreign families adopting Chinese orphans. Baidu Baike deleted Yan's entry and the searches for her name on Sina Weibo became unavailable. Zhang Yimou’s film One Second, adapted from Yan's novel, was released with her name removed from the credits. Although the blacklisting cut off Yan from opportunities in screenwriting and publishing in mainland China, it also granted her "freedom" and "peace" in her literary creation. She switched to self-publication through New Song Media, a publishing house she set up with her husband in Berlin.

== Personal life ==
Yan's ex-husband is Li Kewei; they divorced in the 1990s. In 1992, Yan married her second husband Lawrence Walker in San Bruno, California. Walker is a diplomat. They have no biological children together, but have adopted a Chinese girl, Yanyan.

Yan currently resides in Berlin, Germany with her husband Walker.
