= Sky Burial =

Book by Xue Xinran

- First edition
- Author: Xue Xinran
- Language: English
- Genre: Biography
- Publisher: Chatto and Windus
- Publication date: 1 July 2004
- Publication place: United Kingdom
- Media type: Print (Hardback and Paperback)
- Pages: 256 pp
- ISBN: 0-7011-7622-9
- OCLC: 56188938

Sky Burial is a 2004 book by Xue Xinran, her second. Xue is a British-Chinese journalist who writes for The Guardian. Sky Burial was listed in the Los Angeles Times as one of their favorite non-fiction books of 2005.

== Plot summary ==
The book involves a Chinese woman, Shu Wen, retelling her life in Tibet to Xinran in a tea shop in Suzhou.

In the 1950s, as China revels in its unification under Communism, Shu Wen, a doctor, marries a military doctor who gets orders to go into Tibet to subdue the Tibetan people and bring them under Chinese rule. The reputation of the Tibetans from the Chinese government paints them as sympathetic and welcoming, but gradually she learns of their resistance to subjugation. She is informed that her husband has gone missing, and against the wishes of her family and friends, she leaves her comfortable life in Suzhou to join the Army and search for him in Tibet.

Her unit encounters a Tibetan woman near death in the highlands, and Shu Wen decides to treat the woman and take her away from her soldiers, who suspect she is a scout or a resistance fighter. The two women are soon separated from the regiment. Without supplies and knowledge of the language, she wanders, trying to find her way until, on the brink of death, she is rescued by a family of nomads under whose protection she moves from place to place with the seasons. During these 30 years she learns the Tibetan way of life and gradually loses her sense of Chinese identity, while quietly hoping for news of her husband's fate.

Years after joining the nomads, she encounters Chinese soldiers who tell her about a Chinese doctor who received the Tibetan ritual of sky burial. After going to a nomad gathering, she meets an old sage, who tells her that he was the man rescued by her husband, who in doing so disrupted a sky burial ritual, shot a vulture dead, chased all the vultures away and angered the Tibetans. To ensure the safety of his unit, her husband chose to sacrifice himself to call the vultures back through a sky burial, which would double up as demonstration that Chinese people are not demons, but only people, like the Tibetans. This soothed the angry Tibetans and put an end to skirmishes between the two people in this area. The sage said he would continue to sing the praises of the doctor as long as he lived, and Shu Wen finds peace. She returns to Suzhou, where Xinran encounters her, still searching for her relatives and eking out a modest living.

== Narrative viewpoint ==
Most of the book is by third person, and also includes first person, which is Xue.
