= Esther Tyldesley =

British translator and academic

- Occupations: Academic, Translator

Academic background
- Education: Robinson College, University of Cambridge (1990–1994), University of Leeds (2001–2003)

Academic work
- Discipline: Asian Studies
- Institutions: University of Edinburgh (2004–), Newcastle University (2002–2004)

Esther Tyldesley is an academic based in the School of Literature, Languages and Cultures at the University of Edinburgh, where she is a professor in Asian Studies. She has also translated Chinese literature, as well as language textbooks and translated academic articles for various journalists. In addition to this, she is also a member of the Society of Authors.

== Biography ==
=== Academic career ===
Tyldesley undertook her BA at Robinson College, University of Cambridge, where she studied Chinese from 1990 to 1994. She went on to do an MA in applied translation studies at the University of Leeds from 2001 to 2003. She has been a teaching fellow in Chinese and English at the University of Edinburgh since 2004. She was previously a teaching assistant at Newcastle University from 2002 to 2004. She also spent four years working for a rural teacher's college for voluntary overseas observers in Guizhou Province, China.

=== Translation career ===
Tyldesley specialises in Chinese-to-English translations, primarily in the literature field. Her notable translations include The Good Women of China; which has since been translated into various languages and serialised as an audio drama for BBC Radio 4's Woman's Hour, Yan Geling's Little Aunt Crane; where her translation was praised for: "flowing naturally while remaining faithful to the original, allowing the flavour of Yan's language to shine through" - the novel was also awarded a grant by the Chinese Society of Authors, and Laing Hong's The Sacred Clan; winner of the PEN Translates Award in December 2021. Her translation of Yan Lianke's "China's Caged Birds" in The Freedom Papers (Gutter Magazine 2018), was one of the books read on BBC Radio 4's "Book of the Week" programme. Other notable works include Sky Burial and Miss Chopsticks. Tydesley has also translated language textbooks, academic articles for various journalists, and contributed to translations in the HarperCollins Pocket Chinese-English dictionary.

=== Personal life ===
Tyldesley lives in Edinburgh with her husband, who is Chinese.

== List of published translations (Chinese to English) ==
=== Novels ===
- Xinran, The Good Women of China (2002)
- Xinran, Sky Burial (2004)
- Xinran, Miss Chopsticks (2007)
- Xinran, China Witness (2008)
- Yu Dan, Confucius from the Heart (2009)
- Xinran, Buy Me the Sky (2015)
- Yan Geling, Little Aunt Crane (2015)
- Chen Danyan, The Day of Wandering Thoughts (2020)

=== Articles ===
- Yan Lianke, "China's Caged Birds" in The Freedom Papers (Gutter Magazine 2018)
