= Gigi Leung =

Hong Kong actress and singer

- 梁詠琪
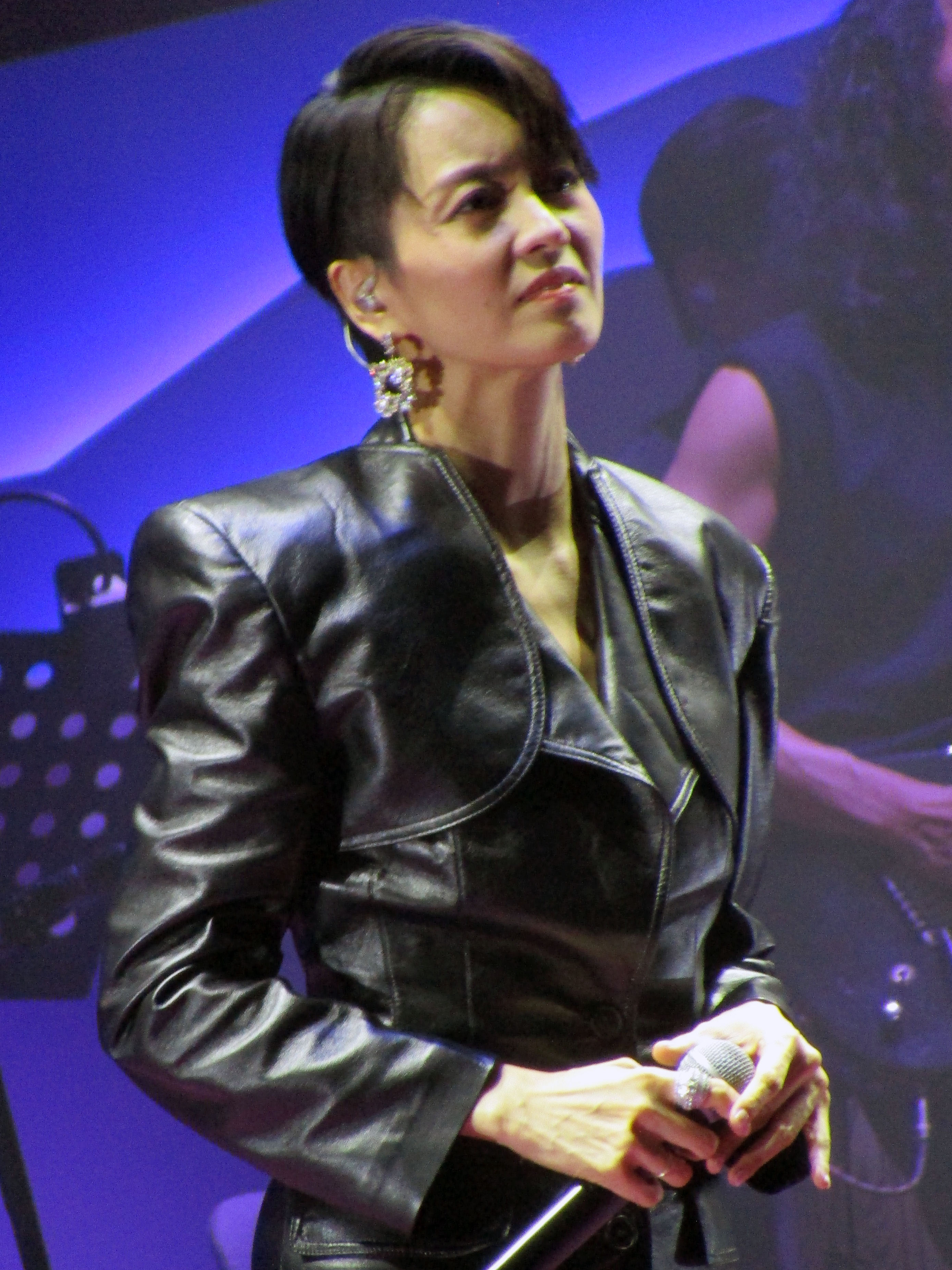
- Leung in 2023
- Born: 25 March 1976 (age 50); Tsan Yuk Hospital, Sai Ying Pun, British Hong Kong
- Education: Hong Kong Polytechnic University
- Occupations: Singer; actress
- Years active: 1995–present
- Spouse: Sergio Crespo Gutes (m. 2011)
- Children: 1
- Musical career
- Also known as: Leung Wing-kei
- Genres: Cantopop, Mandopop
- Label: Universal Music Hong Kong

Chinese name
- Traditional Chinese: 梁詠琪
- Simplified Chinese: 梁咏琪
Transcriptions
Standard Mandarin
- Hanyu Pinyin: Liáng Yǒngqí
Yue: Cantonese
- Jyutping: Leong4 Wing6 Kei4
- Website: gigileung.com.hk

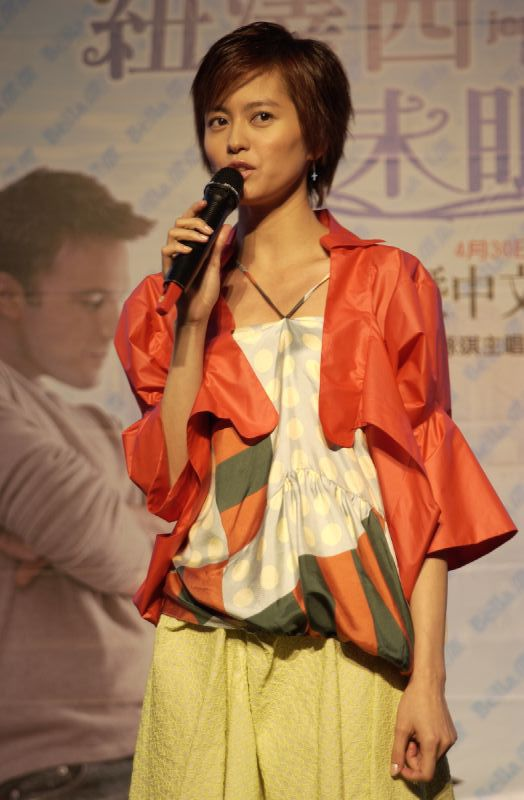
Leung in 2004

Gigi Leung Wing-kei (Chinese: 梁詠琪; born 25 March 1976) is a Hong Kong singer and actress.

== Early life, family and education ==
She and her twin brother Keith Leung Wing-chun (Leung Wing-chun, 梁詠俊) were born at Tsan Yuk Hospital in Sai Ying Pun on 25 March 1976 and was given the name Leung Pik-chi (梁碧姿) for superstitious reasons; as a child, Leung suffered from frequent asthma attacks and it was believed a change of name would bring better health. Because of her height of 176 cm (5 ft 9 in), Leung has the nickname Tall Girl.

Leung attended Maryknoll Convent School. Later, she went to the Hong Kong Polytechnic University where she gained a diploma from the School of Design. It was during her study at university that she accepted a modelling assignment from the watch company City Chain and caught the attention of film director Lee Chi-ngai who cast her in her very first movie, Doctor Mack (1995). The success of the movie brought her a further role in Full Throttle (1995), shot while she was finishing her diploma. For her supporting role in the film, Leung received a nomination for Best Newcomer at the 1995 Hong Kong Film Awards.

== Career ==
Her singing career began the following year with the debut album Love Myself (1996). Since then, she has sung both Cantonese and Mandarin songs. She is recognised not only as a Cantopop/Mandopop singer, but as a songwriter and lyricist as well, having written songs for both herself and other local singers. She has a contract with Warner Music Hong Kong, with more than a dozen albums to her name. She has performed in several full-scale live concerts including one entitled Funny Face in 2003.

In 25 March 2008, she signed a contract with Big Artiste Management, a subsidiary of Mei Ah Entertainment.

Since 1995, Leung has starred in over 20 movies, most of which are dramas and comedies. In 2003, she starred with Takeshi Kaneshiro in Turn Left, Turn Right. Notably, at the Hong Kong Film Awards, Leung was nominated for Best Actress and Best Supporting Actress for roles in Tempting Heart (1999) and A War Named Desire (2000) respectively.

Primarily an actress on the silver screen, Leung briefly appeared in the TVB serial The Last Breakthrough (2004). She has also performed in a number of stage musicals including The Great Entertainer (2004). Other works include the Cantonese narration for the Japanese film Quill (2004).

Leung is also active in charity work. Apart from being the ambassador for different charities, she has helped to build 7 schools in Mainland China to help poor children. She is also the youngest-ever local (at age 27) to receive the "Ten Most Outstanding Youth Award" in Hong Kong.

Leung is popular not just in Hong Kong, but also in Mainland China, Taiwan and Southeast Asia.

=== Spokesperson ===
Leung worked as an ambassador to both United Nations Children's Fund (UNICEF) and World Wide Fund for Nature (WWF) Hong Kong. Other charity ambassador titles include Honourably Ambassador of Yan Chai Hospital, Special Ambassador to the Yan Aiu Hospital, Ambassador of Breast Cancer Fund, and Ambassador of Society for Abandoned Animals (SAA). She also held numerous other special titles to organizations, including Hope Foundation.

== Personal life ==
Gigi Leung had a seven-year relationship with singer-actor Ekin Cheng. They broke up in 2006.

In July 2009, she was reported to be in a relationship with a furniture designer from France, known only as Sly. Neither Gigi nor Sly admitted their relationship, but it was reported that the couple separated in early 2010.

On 3 October 2011, Leung married her Spanish boyfriend Sergio Crespo Gutes on the Spanish island Ibiza. On 28 February 2015, Leung gave birth to her first child, a daughter, Sofia Crespo Leung (祈淑菲).

=== Weibo incident ===
On 30 March 2010, Gigi Leung posted on her Weibo about the plight of Zhao Lianhai, a father-turned-activist whose five-year-old son fell victim to poison milk and developed kidney stones. Leung later deleted the post. She posted another message saying, "The mainland has its own rules. If I need to delete something, so be it. But I still don't like to see incidents that are unfair, especially if they happen to regular people."

== Filmography ==
=== Film ===
Year	English title	Original title	Role	Notes/Ref.
1995	Full Throttle	烈火戰車	Annie / Yee	
1995	Sixty Million Dollar Man	百變星君	Chung Chung	
1995	Mack the Knife	流氓醫生	May	
1996	The First Option	飛虎	Insp. Mini Kwan	
1996	Feel 100%	百分百感覺	Fong Fong	
1996	Feel 100%... Once More	百分百岩Feel	Emma	
1996	God of Gamblers 3: The Early Stage	賭神3之少年賭神	Kent Hing	
1997	First Love Unlimited	初戀無限Touch!	Tap / Stephenie Wong	
1997	We're No Bad Guys	愛上100%英雄	Carrie / Mandy	
1998	A True Mob Story	龍在江湖	Sandy Leung	
1998	Hitman	殺手之王	Kiki	
1999	Tempting Heart	心動	Shen Sheo-rou	
1999	Afraid of Nothing: The Jobless King	失業皇帝	Law Nam	
2000	A War Named Desire	愛與誠	Snow	
2000	Marooned	藍煙火	Cheung Siu-yu	
2000	Those Were the Days	友情歲月山雞故事	Lok Wing-gee	
2000	Bruce Law Stunts	特技猛龍	Herself	Documentary
2000	From Ashes to Ashes	煙飛煙滅		Short film
2001	The Avenging Fist	拳神	Erika	
2001	Roots and Branches	我的兄弟姊妹	Qi Sitian	
2001	La Brassiere	絕世好Bra	Lena	
2002	Mighty Baby	絕世好B	Lena	
2002	Fat Choi Spirit	嚦咕嚦咕新年財	Gigi	
2003	Sky of Love	愛，斷了線	Yan Xiaojia	
2003	Turn Left, Turn Right	向左走．向右走	Eve Choi	
2003	1:99 Shorts	1:99 電影行動		
2003	Love Under the Sun	愛在陽光下		Short film
2004	Love on the Rocks	戀情告急	Annie	
2004	Driving Miss Wealthy	絕世好賓 / 窈窕淑女	Jennifer Feng	
2004	Quill	クイール		Cantonese dub
2005	Racing Stripes	—N/a		Cantonese dub
2006	McDull, The Alumni	春田花花同學會	Salesgirl / Hotpot receptionist	
2007	Wonder Woman	女人．本色	Joy Shing	
2007	The Secret of the Magic Gourd	寶葫蘆的秘密	Ms. Liu	
2007	A Tale of Mari and Three Puppies	{マリと子犬の物語		Cantonese dub
2007	Dangerous Game	棒子老虎雞	Huan	
2008	La Lingerie	內衣少女	Lena	
2009	Give Love	愛得起	Leslie Chan	
2010	Just Another Pandora's Box	越光寶盒	Ambassador of Turkestan	
2011	Rest on Your Shoulder	肩上蝶	Yang Lin	
2011	The Allure of Tears	傾城之淚	Yang Lin	
2011	Dear Enemy	親密敵人	Rebecca	
2012	Marry a Perfect Man	嫁個100分男人	Winnie Yip	
2012	Hot Stewardess	麻辣空姐		
2012	Fortune Cookies	幸運曲奇	Boss	Short film, Also as director and screenwriter
2013	7 Assassins	光輝歲月	Xi Lian	
2013	Desertion	被遺棄的	—N/a	Short film, As director
2013	4 in Life	四季人生		
2014	The Monkey King	大鬧天宮	Chang'e	
2014	Aberdeen	香港仔	Cici	
2015	Wong Ka Yan	王家欣		
2016	Sing	—N/a	Rosita	Cantonese dub
2016	Sisterhood	骨妹	Sei	
2018	The Monkey King 3	西遊記之女兒國	Advisor	
2019	Missbehavior			
2019	Little Q			
2022	Chilli Laugh Story			
2025	Hit N Fun	臨時決鬥	Carrie Mok	

=== Television series ===
Year	English title	Original title	Network	Role	Notes
2004	Supreme Fate in Regalia Bay	富豪海灣至尊家緣	TVB	Gigi	EP6
2004	The Last Breakthrough	天涯俠醫	TVB	Eva Ha	Special appearance
2005	The Zone	奇幻潮	TVB	Herself	EP4
2006	Stephen's Diary	老馮日記	TVB	Herself	EP11
2013	K Song Lover	K歌·情人·夢	CTS	Jazz dance teacher	EP6-7
2022	The Parents League	反起跑線聯盟	ViuTV	Nora	Main Role

=== Television shows ===
Year	English title	Original title	Network	Role	Notes/Ref.
2020	Gigi's Friends Club	詠琪心友會	ViuTV	Host	

== Musical ==
Year	English title	Original title	Role
2002	Legal Entanglement	法網外的伊人	Sammi Shum

== Discography ==
=== Studio albums ===
Year	English title	Original title	Language	
Year	English title	Original title	Cantonese	Mandarin
1996	Love Myself	愛自己	Yes	
1997	Short Hair	短髮		Yes
1997	New Home	新居	Yes	
1997	Washing My Face	洗臉		Yes
1998	Gigi	梁詠琪		Yes
1998	I'll Be Loving You	I'll Be Loving You	Yes	
1999	Fresh	新鮮		Yes
2000	Good Times	好時辰	Yes	
2000	Fireworks	花火	Yes	
2001	Amour	Amour		Yes
2001	Suddenly, This Summer	Suddenly, This Summer	Yes	
2001	G for Girl	G for Girl	Yes	
2001	Transparent	透明		Yes
2002	I Live in 7A	我住7樓A	Yes	
2002	Magical Season	魔幻季節		Yes
2002	Funny Face	Funny Face	Yes	
2003	I Think, I Sing	我想、我唱	Yes	
2004	Sense of Belonging	歸屬感		Yes
2004	[Ente'tein]	娛樂大家	Yes	
2005	Look	Look	Yes	
2006	Grown Up Short Hair	成長的短髮	Yes	
2006	Love Songs For Myself	給自己的情歌		Yes
2009	Gift	禮物		Yes
2010	Cat Afraid of Loneliness	怕寂寞的貓	Yes	
2021	Capítulo	Capítulo	Yes	

=== Extended plays ===
Year	English title	Original title	Language	
Year	English title	Original title	Cantonese	Mandarin
1999	Today	—N/a	Yes	
2012	Butterfly Kisses	—N/a		Yes
2016	BeSIDE Me	—N/a	Yes	Yes
2020	PRELUDIO	—N/a	Yes	

=== Compilation albums ===
Year	English title	Original title	Language	
Year	English title	Original title	Cantonese	Mandarin
2000	Love Gigi The Most	最愛梁詠琪		Yes
2000	Kiss	Kiss 新曲+精選	Yes	
2004	I Like Gigi	我鍾意	Yes	
2005	Clockwise	順時針新曲+精選		Yes
2007	Woman. Colour	女．色新曲+精選2007	Yes	

=== Live albums ===
Year	English title	Original title	Language	
Year	English title	Original title	Cantonese	Mandarin
2000	903 Live	加洲紅紅人館 903梁詠琪狂熱份子音樂會	Yes	
2002	G For Girl Live 2002	G For Girl Live 2002	Yes	
2002	903 id Club Music is Live	903 id club梁詠琪拉闊音樂會2002	Yes	
2003	Funny Face Live 2003	高妹梁詠琪Funny Face 2003演唱會	Yes	Yes

=== Soundtrack albums ===
Year	English title	Original title	Language	
Year	English title	Original title	Cantonese	Mandarin
2003	Turn Left, Turn Right	向左走．向右走	Yes	Yes

== Concerts and tours ==
- Gigi Leung Concert 2023 | Somewhere in Time February 17–19 (2023) Hong Kong Coliseum
- Gigi Leung Good Time World Tour, May 4–5 (2018) Hong Kong Coliseum
- Gigi Leung Good Time Concert World Tour Part 2 (梁詠琪好时辰世界巡回演唱會)（2017）
- Gigi Leung Good Time Concert Tour Part 1 (梁詠琪好时辰巡回演唱會) (2016)
- Gigi Leung One Night in Hong Kong (梁詠琪香港G夜演唱會) (2011)
- Gigi Leung One Night in Beijing (梁詠琪北京G夜演唱會) (2010)
- Wonder Woman Charity Concert (2007)
- Solo Concert in Shanghai (2007)
- Tall Girl Gigi Leung Funny Face Live Concert (2003)
- Live 903 (2002) 903 id club梁詠琪拉闊音樂會2002
- G for Girl Live (2002)
- Gigi Leung 903 Concert (2000) 加洲紅紅人館903梁詠琪狂熱份子音樂會

== Awards and nominations ==
Year	Award	Category	Nominated work	Result
1996	19th Hong Kong Film Awards	Best New Performer	Full Throttle	Nominated
1996	1996 Jade Solid Gold Best Ten Music Awards Presentation	Most Popular New Artist (Gold)	—N/a	Won
1997	1997 Jade Solid Gold Best Ten Music Awards Presentation	Outstanding Performance Award (Bronze)	—N/a	Won
1999	36th Golden Horse Awards	Best Leading Actress	Tempting Heart	Nominated
2000	19th Hong Kong Film Awards	Best Actress	Tempting Heart	Nominated
2000	Golden Bauhinia Awards	Best Actress	Tempting Heart	Nominated
2000	6th Hong Kong Film Critics Society Awards	Best Actress	Tempting Heart	Nominated
2001	2001 MTV Video Music Awards	International Viewer's Choice Award - MTV Mandarin	"The Price of Love"	Nominated
2001	20th Hong Kong Film Awards	Best Supporting Actress	A War Named Desire	Nominated
2002	2nd Chinese Film Media Awards	Most Popular Actress	Roots and Branches	Won
2002	8th Hong Kong Film Critics Society Awards	Best Actress	La Brassiere	Nominated
2003	40th Golden Horse Awards	Best Original Film Song	Turn Left, Turn Right - "At the Carousel" (as performer)	Won
2003	9th Hong Kong Film Critics Society Awards	Best Actress	Fat Choi Spirit	Nominated
2004	23rd Hong Kong Film Awards	Best Original Film Song	Turn Left, Turn Right - "Luck of Two People" (as performer)	Nominated
2007	Golden Bauhinia Awards	Best Actress	Wonder Woman	Nominated
2007	Singapore Hit Awards 2007	Most Popular Female Artist	—N/a	Nominated
2008	29th Hundred Flowers Awards	Best Actress	The Secret of the Magic Gourd	Nominated
2012	4th Macau International Movie Festival	Golden Lotus Award for Best Supporting Actress	4 in Life	Won
2015	7th Macau International Movie Festival	Golden Lotus Award for Best Supporting Actress	Wong Ka Yan	Nominated
2015	15th Chinese Film Media Awards	Best Supporting Actress	Aberdeen	Nominated
