= Dawn Break Up =

- 天亮·分手
- Directed by: Li Kai
- Release date: May 29, 2015
- Running time: 90 minutes
- Country: China
- Language: Mandarin
- Box office: CN¥300,000 (China)

Dawn Break Up (Chinese: 天亮·分手) is a 2015 Chinese romantic drama film directed by Li Kai.

== Cast ==
- Daniel Chan
- Yin Hang
- Shone An
- Li Juan
- Luo Yan
- Shen Xuewei

== Reception ==
By June 2, 2015, the film had earned CN¥300,000 at the Chinese box office.
