= Bishonen (film) =

1998 Hong Kong film by Yonfan

Bishonen...
- Film poster
- Traditional Chinese: 美少年之戀
- Simplified Chinese: 美少年之恋
- Hanyu Pinyin: Měishàonián zhī Liàn
- Jyutping: Mei5siu3nin4 zi1 lyun2
- Directed by: Yonfan
- Written by: Yonfan
- Produced by: Sylvia Chang
- Starring: Stephen Fung; Daniel Wu; Shu Qi
- Narrated by: Brigitte Lin
- Cinematography: Henry Chung
- Edited by: Kam Ma
- Music by: Chris Babida
- Production company: Far-Sun Film Company
- Distributed by: Chong Cho Sau Productions
- Release date: 14 August 1998
- Running time: 111 minutes
- Country: Hong Kong
- Language: Cantonese
- Box office: US$18,629 (US)

Bishonen... (Chinese: 美少年之戀; literally: Passion Between Beautiful Youths) is a 1998 Hong Kong romantic drama film about an ill-fated gay romance. Written and directed by Yonfan, the film stars Stephen Fung, Daniel Wu and Shu Qi.

In 2011, the film was screened at the 16th Busan International Film Festival as part of a retrospective of Yonfan's work, which featured seven of his restored and re-mastered films from the 1980s through the 2000s.

== Synopsis ==
Jet (Stephen Fung) is a handsome gay hustler whose sex appeal seems to know no bounds. Everyone wants to make love to him, but he is in love with no one but himself and he is very picky about his clients. Things change drastically when he notices what seems like a young couple in a shop, Sam (Daniel Wu) and Kana (Shu Qi). At first sight, he falls in love with Sam and begins following the two around trying to get noticed by him.

Jet's friend Ching, who is also a hustler, runs a personal advertisement in a gay magazine for Jet, imploring Sam to contact Jet. At first, Jet is angry with Ching for not asking him, but his wrath subsides quickly when indeed he meets Sam again in what seems like a chance encounter. Sam turns out to be a police officer and Jet starts to befriend him, hoping this will turn into a relationship. But Sam does not seem to notice Jet's intentions. Jet quickly gains love and trust of Sam's parents and visits them often and helping them with chores and is jealous by the love and affection Sam receives and really wants to become a part of it.

Unbeknownst to Jet, Sam had a relationship with pop star Kingsley a.k.a. K.S. (Terence Yin) five years earlier. At the same time, Ching had been in unrequited love with Sam (then calling himself Fai) when the two were co-workers in an office. Then just a small star, K.S. spends too much money on clothes and other expenses. Sam borrows some money from Ching to pay for his boyfriend's expenses; unbeknownst to Sam, Ching made the money by becoming a hustler hoping that he can finally settle down with Sam after saving enough money. But Kingsley's expenses just increase, so Sam starts renting himself out to make some money for his boyfriend. He eventually leaves Kingsley and Ching behind and joins the police department to become an officer like his father.

In the present day Jet feels more and more guilty about his profession due to his love towards Sam. One day Jet spends a night in Sam's apartment because he lost his key but nothing happens between them even though Jet wanted this occasion to be their special moment where his love finally get recognized. Disappointed, Jet travels to one of his usual part and hooks up with Kingsley. After having sex, Kingsley says that Jet smells like someone he used to know. Jet's guilt only increases after this event.

Jet continues to hang out with Sam and one day he gets hurt while playing beach volleyball. Sam helps Jet to get to his apartment which he shares with Ching. Ching comes in after work instantly recognizes Sam as Fai and is furious with Jet for stealing his beloved. Sam runs back to his apartment, but Jet pursues him. The two kiss, but they are interrupted by an unknown person at the door. Sam quickly rushes to find who it is but that person had already left.

Later, Sam while having dinner with his parents he finds out that it was his father who was there that day. Unwilling to face his father's disappointment, he kills himself. Jet, depressed with Sam's death, continues to live on as a hustler. Kana brings Jet a letter written by Sam before he committed suicide, informing Jet that Sam loved him and attached to the letter was the personal ad Ching ran on the magazine Sam was keeping like a treasure with him. Jet goes to sleep that night peacefully after knowing someone truly loved him and Sam appears in his dreams for the first time.

== Cast ==
- Stephen Fung as Jet
- Daniel Wu as Sam
- Shu Qi as Kana
- Terence Yin as K.S
- Jason Tsang as Ching
- Kenneth Tsang as Sam's father
- Lisa Chiao Chiao as Sam's mother
- Cheung Tat-ming as Tsu
- James Wong as Sex-buyer
- Joe Junior as Photographer
- Paul Fonoroff as Sex-buyer
- Michael Lam as Sex-buyer
- Yim Chim-lam
- Ma Man-ming
- Wu Kai-kwong
- Sherwin Ming as bar customer
- Brigitte Lin (narrator)

== Theme song ==
- Answer (答案)
  - Composer: Chris Babida
  - Lyricist: Yao Chien
  - Singer: Coco Lee

== See also ==
- Cinema of Hong Kong
- List of Hong Kong films
