= Liang Hong =

Chinese author and academic

- 梁鸿
- Born: 1973 (age 52–53); Henan Province, China
- Occupations: Author, Professor

Liang Hong (Chinese: 梁鸿; born 1973) is a contemporary Chinese author and academic.

== Biography ==
Liang grew up in Liang Village, near Nanyang, Henan. She is the fifth of six children. During her childhood, shortly after her elder sister was accepted into Nanyang Medical College, Liang's mother fell ill, due to which her family encouraged her to pursue a career in education to provide financial support. She graduated Nanyang No 4 Normal School in 1991, subsequently working as a rural school teacher for three years. Afterwards she obtained an associate degree and bachelor's degree at Nanyang Institute of Education, followed by a master's degree at Zhengzhou University and finally a PhD in literature from Beijing Normal University.

=== Literary career ===
Between 2003 and 2008, while working as a professor, Liang regularly returned to Liang Village, typically once or twice each year for a one to two week stay. In summer 2008, Liang remained in Liang Village for two months to make a record of her daily life in the village. She started her writings with the express goal of not producing a novel or academic work, but to instead "feel the most direct bond between my soul and the land". She ultimately published her recordings in 2010 under the title China in One Village (Chinese title: 中国在梁庄), for which she received several awards, including the People's Literature Award.

China in One Village was followed up by Leaving Liang Village (Chinese title: 出梁庄记) in 2013, and Liang Village Ten Years On (Chinese title: 神圣家族) in 2021. An English translated version: China in One Village: The Story of One Town and the Changing World, translated by Emily Goedde, was published in 2021. The books focus on how rural parts of China have been left behind by the country in the past few decades as it experienced seismic economic growth. More recently, she has published two novels, The Light of Liang Guangzheng (Chinese title: 梁光正的光) and Four Forms. In December 2021, her short stories collection, The Sacred Clan, translated by Esther Tyldesley, won the PEN Translates award.

=== Academic career ===
In 2003, Liang became a professor at China Youth University of Political Studies. Liang now is a professor in literature at Renmin University, Beijing; specialising in scholarly research on twentieth century Chinese literature. She was previously a visiting scholar at Duke University in Durham, North Carolina. Her academic works include: Yellow Flower Moss and Soap Horn Trees, Construction of New Enlightenment Discourse, Notes of Foreign Affairs, The Disappearance of "Spiritual Light", "Homestalgia" as a Method and her academic essay collection History and My Moments.

== Notable works ==
=== Novels (Chinese) ===
- 中国在梁庄 [China in One Village] (2010)
- 出梁庄记 [English: Leaving Liang Village] (2013)
- 神圣家族 [English: The Holy Family] (2015)
- 梁光正的光 [English: The Light of Liang Guangzheng] (2017)
- 梁庄十年 [Liang Village Ten Years On] (2021)

=== Translated works (English) ===
- China in one Village: The Story of One Town and the Changing World (2021)

==== Upcoming works ====
- The Sacred Clan (2023)
