= Society for Abandoned Animals =

UK animal rescue charity

- Formation: 1966; 60 years ago
- Founder: Peggy Henderson
- Type: Charity
- Registration no.: 245426
- Legal status: Charity
- Purpose: Animal rescue
- Headquarters: Mosley Acre Farm, Barfoot Bridge, Stretford, Manchester M32 9UP
- Location: Manchester, United Kingdom
- Website: www.saarescue.co.uk
- Formerly called: The Peggy Henderson Animal Sanctuary

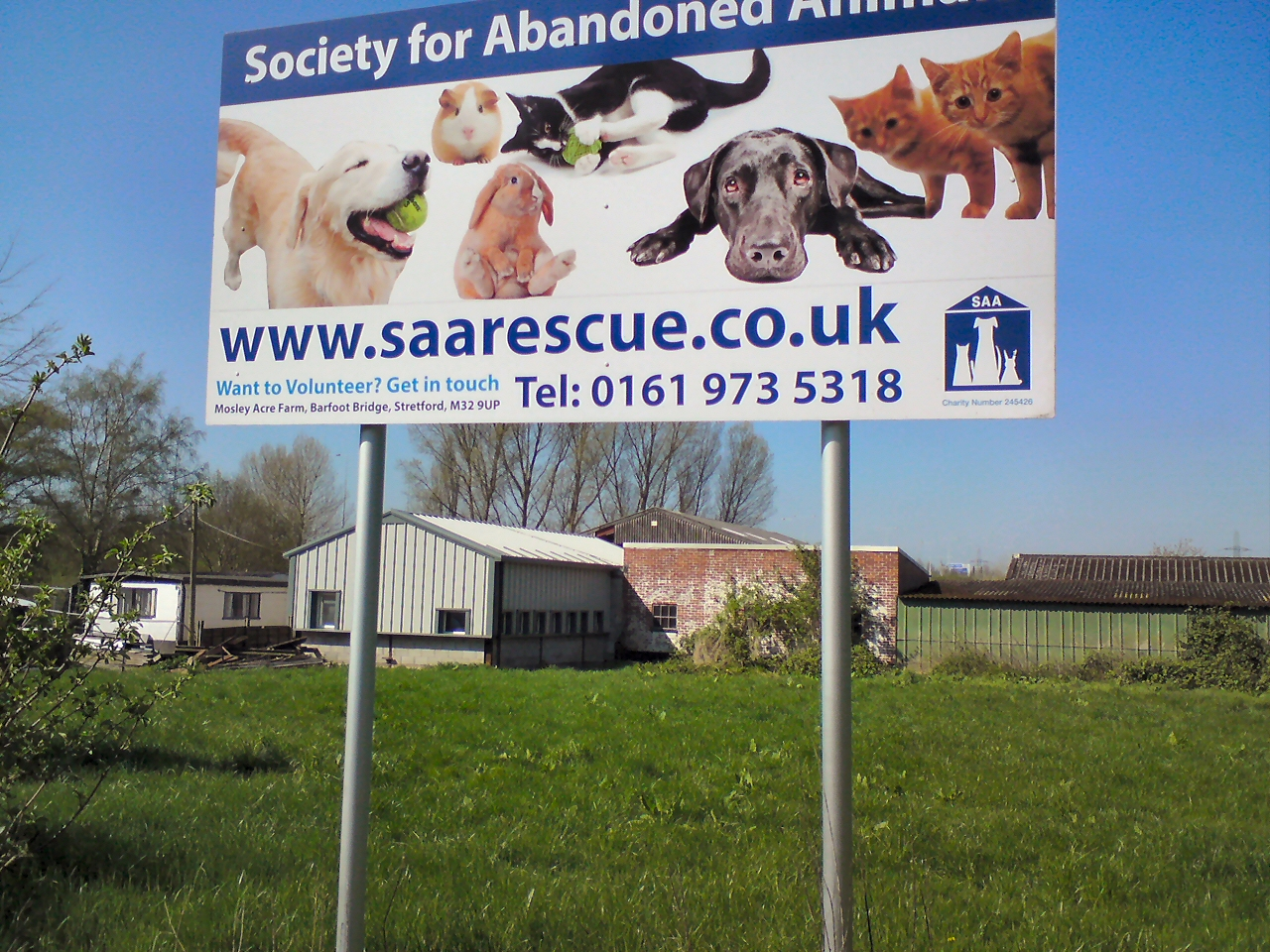
Society for abandoned animals

The Society for Abandoned Animals is an animal rescue based in Manchester, United Kingdom. They primarily rescue cats and rabbits and never put a healthy animal down.

== History ==
The rescue was founded in 1966 by Peggy Henderson. First created to help with a large number of animals displaced by the housing clearance in the Hulme area of Manchester. In 1969 they relocated to Buxton in Derbyshire, but this site wasn't ideal long term closed seven years later and the rescue workers cared for animals at their private homes. They moved into their current location at Mosley Acre Farm in 1994. In 2010 the charity struggled with finances and faced closure but fortunately were able to recover and continue. The sanctuary suffered a serious fire in 2015 which damaged several store rooms but fortunately no animals were harmed.

In 2017 the organisation celebrated 50 years since becoming a registered charity. The charity was awarded the Queen's Award for Voluntary Service in the same year.
