= Daniel Chan =

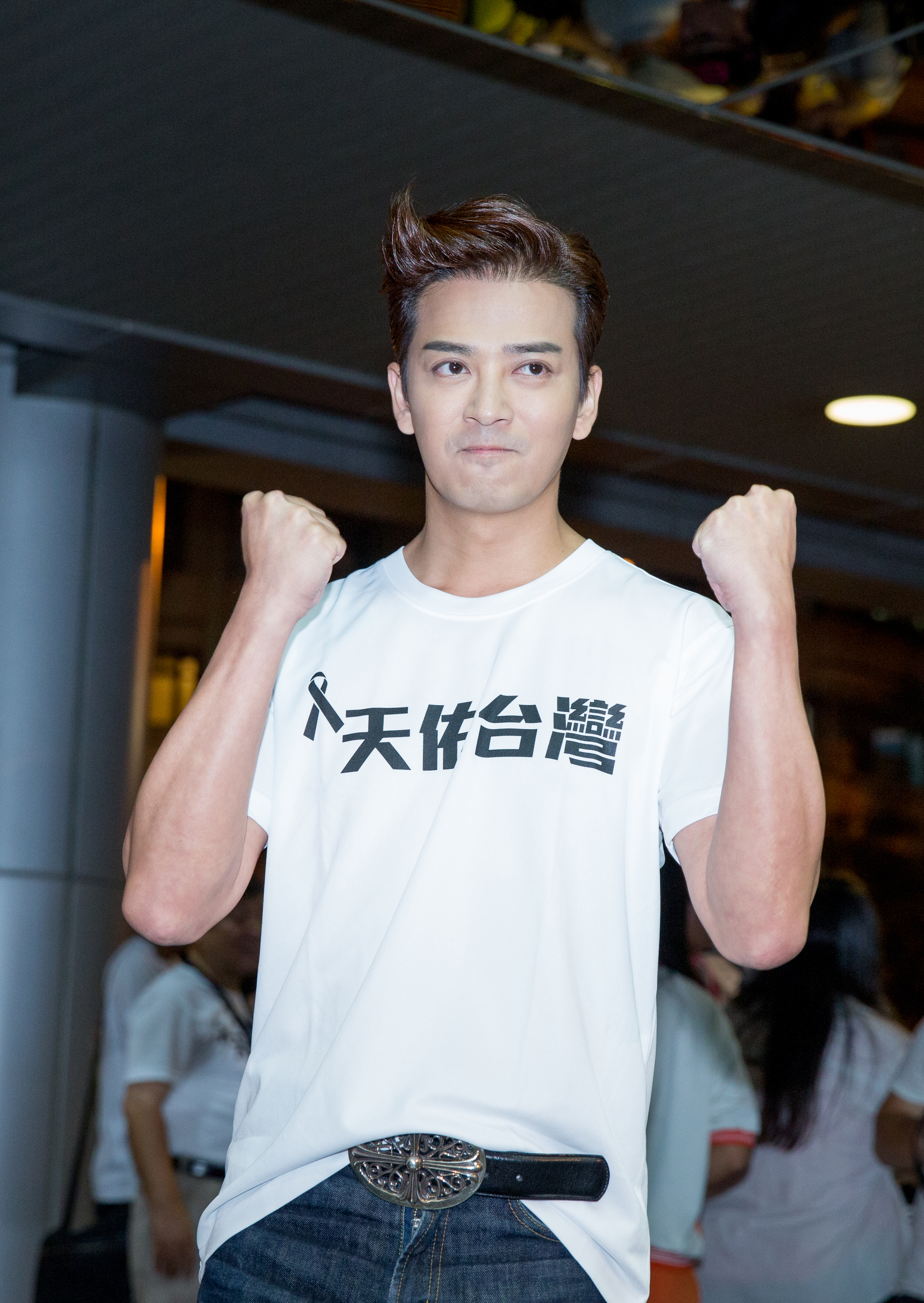
- Chan at a fundraising event after the 2014 Kaohsiung gas explosions
- Born: Chan Cheuk-yeung (陳卓揚); 3 September 1975 (age 51); Hong Kong
- Occupations: Singer, songwriter, actor
- Years active: 1994–present

Chinese name
- Traditional Chinese: 陳曉東
- Simplified Chinese: 陈晓东
Transcriptions
Standard Mandarin
- Hanyu Pinyin: Chén Xiǎodōng
Yue: Cantonese
- Jyutping: Can4 Hiu2dung1
- Musical career
- Also known as: XT, Tung Tung
- Genres: Cantopop, Mandopop
- Instruments: Vocals, guitar
- Label: PolyGram Records (1995–1998); Universal Music Group (1998–2007); EC Music (2007–2008)

Signature
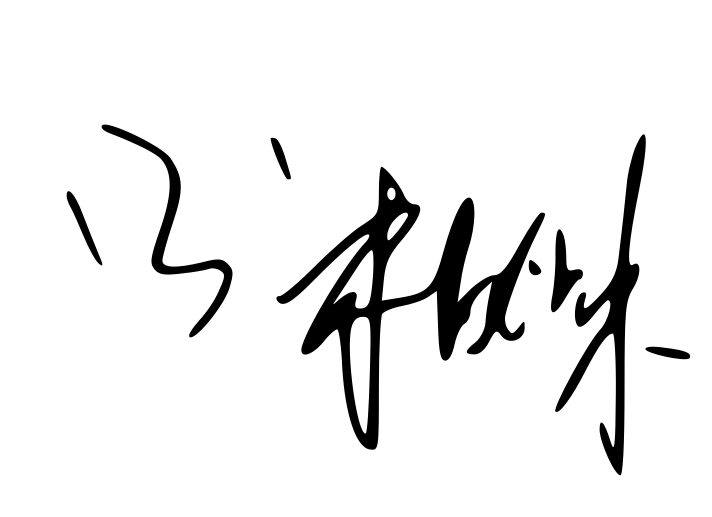

Daniel Chan Hiu-tung (born 3 September 1975) is a Hong Kong singer, songwriter, and actor. He is most notable as one of the young talents in the 1990s music scene.

== Career ==
=== Singer ===
In 2000, following the death of his manager Rebecca Leung, he began changing his singing style.

After nearly three years of being absent from the music scene, he released his 11th Chinese album So Hot in early September 2011. Chan is a Buddhist.

=== Actor ===
As for his movie career, he took part in many films since 1994. In 1996, he played the character Wang Wen Jun from the movie "Hu-Du-Men" which helped him receive the best newcomer nomination in the 16th Hong Kong film awards. In 1997, he played teenager Shum Chi Hong (Shen Zhi Kang) in First love unlimited.

After that, he performed in the big budget Chinese New Year movie alongside Stephen Chow in The Lucky Guy in 1998, together with Shu Qi, Sammi Cheng, and Stephen Chow. Later he starred in the film A War of No Desire where he acted as Francis Ng's brother in 2000. At the same time, he shot For Bad Boys Only, with famous actors such as Ekin Cheng, Louis Koo, and Shu Qi. Chan is however most well known for his appearance as an actor in the movie First love unlimited (1997) with Gigi Leung as one of the best couple, Feel 100% II (2001 -as Hui Lok, went with Nikki Chow, Eason Chan and Miriam Yeung) and the resulting TV series Feel 100%.

== Discography ==
=== Cantonese ===
Year	Title
1995	打開天空 / Open Up The Sky
1995	與我高飛/Fly With Me
1996	了解你的所有 / Understand Your Everything
1996	Sentimental Remix
1996	U R My Only Love
1996	Daniel Chan 1997
1997	在乎你感受 / Care About Your Feelings
1997	心的接觸 / Heart Touch
1997	心理游戲 / Mind Games
1997	Electric Joy EP
1998	AVCD
1998	Holiday
1998	拉闊音樂現場演唱大碟 / Music Is Live
1998	新舊樣本12首 / 12 new and old songs / Xin Jiu Yang Ben 12 Shou
1999	暖情精選 / Warm Love
1999	質感 / Feeling
2000	狂熱份子現場演唱大碟 /903 Live Concert 2000
2000	黑色領帶 /Hei se ling dai / Black tie
2000	Modern Age
2001	不必說感謝 / Don't mention at all
2002	從未忘記 / Never forget
2002	百分百感覺 原聲 / FEEL 100% OST
2002	I Want To Be(陳曉東唱作＋自選情歌集) /I Want To Be Daniel Chan Chang Zuo + Zi Xuan Qing Ge Ji
2008	Best Hits in Danieland
2008	Love Moments

=== Mandarin ===
Year	Title
1997	心有獨鐘 / The Heart Already Knows
1998	感覺貼心 / Close To Heart
1998	我比誰都清楚 / I Know Better Than Anyone
1999	風一樣的男子 / The Man Like the Wind
2000	比我幸福 / Be happier than me
2000	天亮說晚安 / Bonne nuit en aurore
2001	我要的只是愛 / What I need is love
2002	東國度 / Best Of Daniel Chan
2003	Perfect Love
2008	星空夢遊 / Sleepwalking to space
2011	So Hot
2014	Circle

== Filmography ==
=== Movies ===
Year	Title	Role
1994	Golden Gate	Doo-wop singer
1996	虎度門 / Hu-Du-Men	Wang Wen Jun / 王文俊
1996	飛虎雄心2傲氣比天高 / Best of the Best	Chan Xiao Tung / 陳曉東
1997	初戀無限TOUCH / First love unlimited	Shum Chi Hong (Shen Zhi Kang) / 沈志康 paired with Gigi Leung
1998	行運一條龍 / The Lucky Guy	Li De Nan / 李得男
2000	愛與誠 / The War Named Desired	Fang Long Jun / 方龍俊
2000	Bad Boy特攻 / For Bad Boys Only	Tin-ngai
2001	百分百感覺２ / Feeling 100% II	Xu Le / 許樂
2001	蘋果咬一口 / Except a Miracle	Chen Lan Yu / 陳藍雨
2002	停不了的愛 / Loving Him	Xiao Dong / 小東
2002	我的美麗鄉愁 / Far From Home	Jack
2004	海角情緣 / Feroipenme-T	Wen Shan / 文山
2010	A面B面 / The Double Life	
2010	終極匹配 / The Perfect Match	Lao Zhuai / 老拽
2010	愛情36計 / Ai Qing San Shi Liu Ji	
2011	幸存日 / Together	
2012	孩子不坏 / We Not Naughty	Liu CK
2012	家辦囍事 / Starts Good Ends Good	
2012	绣花鞋 / Blood Stained Shoes	
2012	捨身技 / High Kickers	
2012	Catching Monkey	
2013	綁架大明星 Kidnapping of a Big Star	
2015	天亮·分手 Dawn Break Up	
2016	Money and Love	
2019	Karma	

=== TV Series ===
Year	Title	Role
1996	殭屍福星 / Night Journey	Liang Dong / 梁東
2001	新楚留香 / The New Adventures of Chor Lau Heung	Emperor / 皇帝
2002	百分百感覺 / Feel 100%	Jerry
2002	百分百感覺之冬日戀曲 / Feel 100% II	Jerry
2003	男女字典 / 20/30 Dictionary	
2004	倩女幽魂 / Eternity	Ning Cai Chen / 甯采臣
2004	一千個秋天 / Yi Qian Ge Qiu Tian	Nan Feng / 南風
2005	香粉传奇 / Xiang Fen Chuan Qi	Lin Yi Ruo / 林一若
2006	海的誓言 / Hai De Shi Yan	Ou Yang Zheng / 歐陽正
2006	硯道 / Yan Dao	Xiao Fei / 蕭飛
2007	聊齋奇女子 / The Fairies of Liaozhai	Gu Xiang Ru / 顧相如
2011	拜金女王 / Material Queen	Yan Kai Ming / 嚴凱銘
2013	[愛情急整室] / Love SOS	Han Tian Yu / 韓天宇
2013	蘭陵王 / Prince of Lan Ling	Emperor Wu of Northern Zhou / 北周武帝宇文邕 with Ariel Lin co-starring
2014	加油爱人/ 幸福爱人 / Brave lover/ Happy lover	Zhang Han Yu/ 张瀚宇
