= Enter the Phoenix =

2004 Hong Kong film by Stephen Fung

- Film poster
- Directed by: Stephen Fung
- Written by: Story: Stephen Fung; Screenplay: Stephen Fung; Law Yiu-Fai; Helen To
- Produced by: Willie Chan; Jackie Chan; Solon So
- Starring: Eason Chan; Daniel Wu; Karen Mok; Stephen Fung
- Cinematography: Chow Lin-Yau; Poon Hang-Sang
- Edited by: Curran Pang
- Music by: Chan Kwong-wing; Ken Chan Ka-Yip
- Distributed by: JCE Movies Limited
- Release date: April 8, 2004 (Hong Kong)
- Running time: 104 minutes
- Country: Hong Kong
- Language: Cantonese

Enter the Phoenix (Chinese: 大佬愛美麗, Daai lo oi mei lai, literally "Big brother loves beauty") is a 2004 Hong Kong film directed by Stephen Fung.

== Plot ==
When gang master Hung died, his two followers Cheung and Chapman To were sent to Thailand to look for his son, Georgie Hung, to succeed him. Georgie, who is gay and lives as a cook with his boyfriend Frankie, is uninterested to continue his father's work. But his close friend Sam, adored the life of a gangster and took his position instead. Sam and Georgie thus returned to Hong Kong with their identities swapped.

Upon returning, they discovered that Hung had accidentally killed Cheng Chow's father and now Cheng Chow, a leading gangster of a friendly gang, led by Chan Wai-Man, is looking to avenge for his father's death.

Meanwhile, Chan Wai-Man wanted to let his daughter Julie to marry Sam in order to strengthen the bond between the two gangs. Sam initially agrees but later changed his mind when he discovered that Julie is not in love with him.

Finally, Cheng Chow kidnapped both Julie and Sam and forced Georgie to lead his gang on a rescue mission. Georgie, with help from Julie and Sam, defeated Cheng Chow in the final battle and told him to accept the fact that his father's death was an accident. Then Cheng Chow saved Georgie when one of his men tried to take his life.

Julie and Sam fell in love during the kidnapping and decided to get married while Sam and Georgie took joint leadership of the gang.

== Full cast ==
- Eason Chan - Sam
- Daniel Wu - Georgie Hung Chi Kit
- Karen Mok - Julie Lui
- Chapman To - Chapman To
- Law Kar-ying - Master 8 / Cheung / Father Fight
- Stephen Fung - Cheng Chow
- Yuen Biao - Georgie Hung's father
- Nicholas Tse - Cock Head
- Jackie Chan - Mr. Chan / Client of Julie (cameo)
- Brian Lee - David
- Michael Chan - Lui the Gang leader
- Philip Ng - Bo
- Chapman To - Kin
- Sam Lee - Gay Man
- Sammi Cheng - Head Restaurant Manager (cameo)
- Hayama Go - Max Cheung (Chow's Henchman)
- Chan Wai-Man - Lui
- Lee Lik-Chi - Ma Leung
- Glen Chin - Fat Ox
- Maggie Lau - Breeze
- Koey Wong - Precious
- Tenky Kai Man Tin - Assassin
- Courtney Wu - Mr. Ho
- Ankee Leung - Kin's thug
- Sam Hoh - Chow's thug
- Chu Cho-Kuen (extra)

== See also ==
- Jackie Chan filmography
