= Wesley Tongson =

Hong Kong artist

- 唐家偉
- Wesley Tongson in front of his bamboo forest of four panels, 1992
- Born: 16 September 1957; Hong Kong
- Died: 16 July 2012 (aged 54); Hong Kong
- Education: Gu Qingyao, Ontario College of Art, Huang Zhongfang (Harold Wong), Liu Guosong
- Alma mater: Ontario College of Art
- Style: Chinese brush painting, splash ink painting, finger painting
- Awards: Visionary Artist Award from Chinese Culture Center of San Francisco (posthumous)
- Website: http://www.wesleytongson.org/en/

Wesley Tongson (Chinese: 唐家偉 (Tong Ka Wai; pinyin: Tang Jiawei); 1957–2012) was a Hong Kong artist with family roots in Guangdong Province. He was diagnosed with schizophrenia at age 15 and started painting at age 17. From that time until his death, Tongson dedicated himself to exploring various painting techniques with ink, ranging from Chinese brush painting, splash ink painting and eventually, finger painting.

== Early years and education ==
Wesley Tongson received his primary education at the Primary School of St. Paul's Co-educational College in Hong Kong from 1963 to 1969. Afterwards, he went onto the Secondary School of the same college until 1973. In 1973, he briefly attended Brentwood College School in Vancouver, Canada and was diagnosed with schizophrenia. He then returned to Hong Kong and continued his secondary education at Hong Kong International School, graduating in 1977.

In 1974, Tongson took up traditional Chinese painting in Hong Kong. In 1977, he moved to Canada to pursue his studies in western painting at the Ontario College of Art in Toronto. At age 20, Tongson studied Chinese brush painting with Gu Qingyao. Meanwhile, being inspired by the splash ink paintings of Chinese master painter Zhang Daqian, Tongson started to experiment with splash ink techniques himself.

== Career ==
Upon his return to Hong Kong in 1981, Wesley continued his studies with Huang Zhongfang, a collector and painter of Chinese art. In addition, he took a three-month painting course taught by prominent contemporary Chinese artist Liu Guosong and experimented with a wide variety of non-brush techniques, such as ink rubbing and marbling for texturing.

Red Plums Over The Earth, 1993

From the 1980s to 1990s, Tongson continued to explore splash ink painting techniques and began to draw on his Western and Eastern influences to create original contemporary works such as Red Plums Over The Earth (1993). Among Western painters, Tongson admired Pablo Picasso for his cubism movement, which he saw as bringing volume into painting. During the latter half of the 1980s, Tongson's early works were shown in several solo exhibitions and in the 1988 group show "Modern Chinese Paintings by Five Artists" at Hong Kong City Hall.

Tongson considered landscape painting to be the most difficult and highest accomplishment of Chinese art. He continued to devote his energies to master this form throughout his life. His transcendent mountainscapes symbolize his commitment to his Zen-based spiritual journey. Over the course of his life, Tongson explored Christianity, Buddhism and Taoism. These subject matters often appear in his calligraphy and paintings, as in Untitled (Buddhist Theme).

Tongson's work was shown at solo exhibitions in Hong Kong, the United Kingdom and the United States throughout the 1990s, including "Mountains of Heaven - Modern Chinese Painting by Tong Ka Wai" in 1993 and “The Vibrant Land” in 1994. He also participated in group shows "New Trends – Art Hong Kong" in 1994 and "Art Asia" in 1995.

== Later years and death ==
Spiritual Mountains 9, 2010

Beginning in 2001, Tongson started to experiment with finger painting. By 2009, he had virtually ceased using brushes. He adopted “Mountain Taoist” (Chinese: 山斗道人; pinyin: Shandou Daoren) as his sobriquet, which he used to sign his finger paintings, such as Plum 5 (2011) and Spiritual Mountains 7 (2012).

Tongson's large scale finger paintings from this period are regarded by Catherine Maudsley, Hong Kong-based art historian and curator, as notable for their sustained energy and cohesiveness. Wu Song, Director of Wu Song Chinese Ink Studio at Sichuan Fine Arts Institute, observes that by painting with an extension of the body, fingers and fingernails, rather than tools, Tongson was transforming finger painting techniques into spiritual symbols and going beyond the boundaries of Chinese finger painting.

Wesley Tongson died on 16 July 2012.

== Legacy ==
Notable exhibitions since his death include “Ink Explorations: A Wesley Tongson Retrospective” in Hong Kong in 2014, "Wesley Tongson" in Beijing, China in 2016, “Wesley Tongson -The Journey” hosted by Chinese Culture Center of San Francisco in 2018, and "Spiritual Mountains: The Art of Wesley Tongson" at the Berkeley Art Museum and Pacific Film Archive in Berkeley, California in 2022. Following the exhibition in San Francisco, a book launch and talk on "Wesley Tongson - Journey" was held at Asia Society Hong Kong on 9 July 2019. In October 2019, Tongson was honored with the “Visionary Artist Award” by the Chinese Culture Center of San Francisco, USA.

Tongson's works are in public and private collections, including:

- Berkeley Art Museum and Pacific Film Archive, CA, USA;
- Asian Art Museum of San Francisco, CA, USA;
- USC Pacific Asia Museum, Pasadena, CA, USA;
- M+, Hong Kong.
- Hong Kong Museum of Art, Hong Kong;
- University Museum and Art Gallery, University of Hong Kong, Hong Kong;
- Morgan Stanley Asia Limited, Hong Kong;

== Monographs ==
- Spiritual Mountains:The Art of Wesley Tongson (2023)
- Wesley Tongson - The Journey (2019)
- Ink Explorations: A Wesley Tongson Retrospective (2014)
- The Landscape - Modern Chinese Paintings by Tang Jiawei (Wesley Tongson) (1996)
- The Landscape - Modern Chinese Paintings by Tang Jiawei (Wesley Tongson) (1994)
- Wesley Tongson - The Vibrant Land (1994)
- Mountains of Heaven - Modern Chinese Paintings by Tong Ka Wai (1993)
- Mountains of Heaven - Modern Chinese Paintings by Wesley Tongson (1992)
- Dancing Colours - Paintings by Wesley Tongson (1991)
- Traditional Paintings by Wesley Tongson (1988)

Note: The above publications are collected by Asia Art Archive.
