= Remembering Shanghai =

2018 book

- Authors: Isabel Sun Chao and Claire Chao
- Language: English
- Genre: Memoir
- Publisher: Plum Brook LLC
- Publication date: 2018

Remembering Shanghai: A Memoir of Socialites, Scholars and Scoundrels is a 2018 memoir by Isabel Sun Chao and Claire Chao. The memoir is centered around Sun Chao's childhood in 1930s and ’40s Shanghai and her ancestors, going back to the mid-19th century. The idea for the book was sparked by their 2008 visit to their family home.

Remembering Shanghai has received 28 awards, including the Writer's Digest Grand Prize. Originally published by Plum Brook LLC, the book was republished by Girl Friday Books in October 2021.

Remembering Shanghai is being adapted into a drama series.

== Summary ==
Remembering Shanghai: A Memoir of Socialites, Scholars and Scoundrels covers five generations of the Sun family, as told through the eyes of a young Isabel. Sun Chao's recollections alternate with illustrated sections on historical events and Chinese culture by Chao.

Themes include intergenerational relationships within affluent Chinese families in the pre-World War II era and the pressures on wealthy families in Shanghai during the Communist rise to power and subsequent victory. The book is intertwined with historic events including the Opium Wars, the Second Sino-Japanese War and the Communist takeover of Shanghai.

Historically significant people and places make appearances, including film star Butterfly Wu, Shanghai gangster Du Yuesheng, writer Eileen Chang, the Hongkong and Shanghai Bank on the Bund, the Cathay Hotel (now the Fairmont Peace Hotel) and McTyiere School.
