= Claire Chao =

Chinese-American writer and author

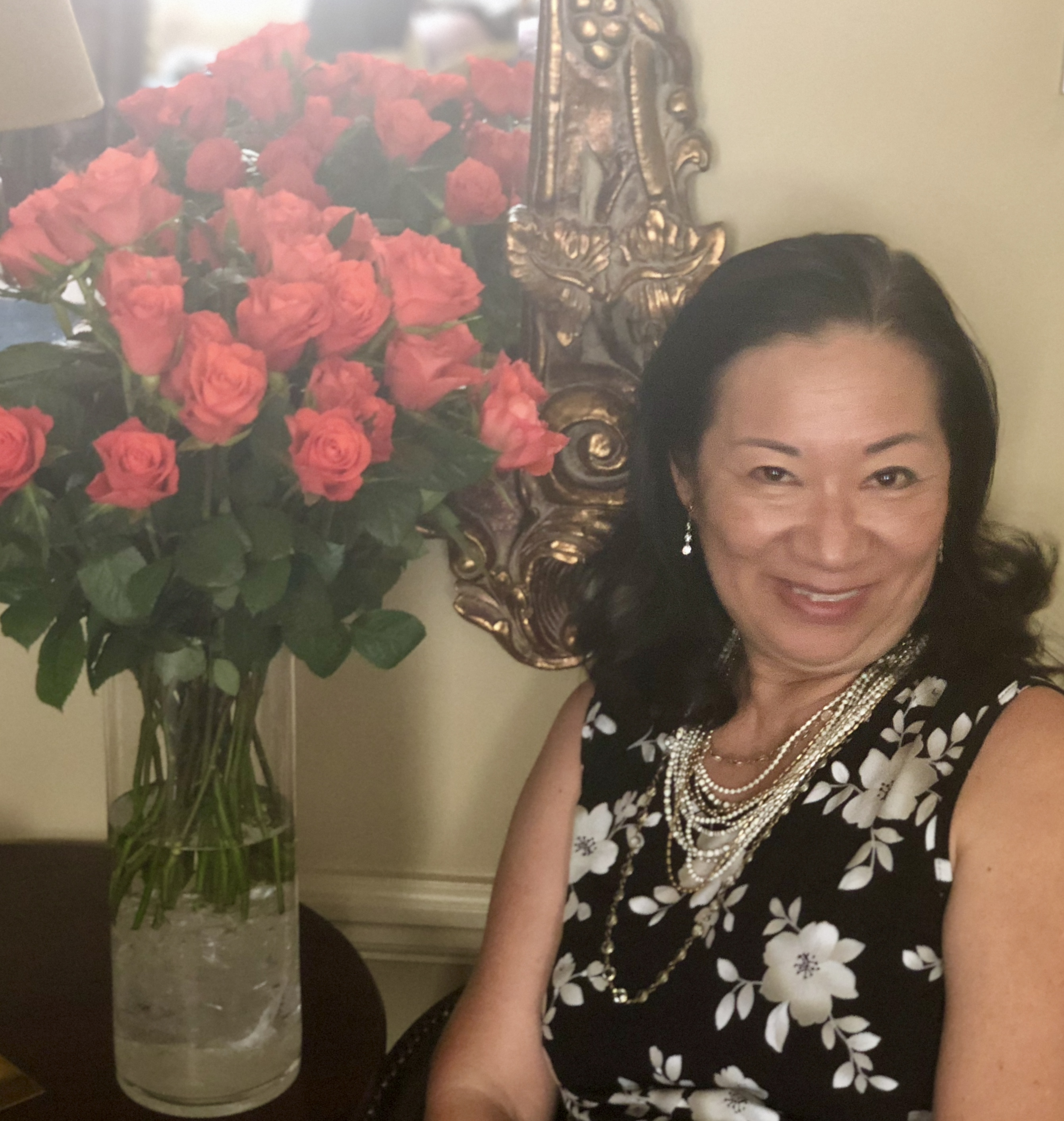

Claire Chao (simplified Chinese: 赵芝洁; traditional Chinese: 趙芝潔; pinyin: Zhào Zhījié; born July 7, 1962, in Hong Kong) is a Chinese-American writer and author. She collaborated with her mother, Isabel Sun Chao, on a family memoir, Remembering Shanghai: A Memoir of Socialites, Scholars and Scoundrels. The idea for a memoir about Sun Chao's childhood in 1930s and 40s Shanghai and ancestors going back to the mid-19th century was sparked by their 2008 visit to the family home.

== Early life and education ==
Chao is the daughter of Shanghai-born Raymond Chao, an advertising executive, and Isabel Sun Chao, cultural affairs specialist at the US Consulate General in Hong Kong. She attended Kennedy Road Junior School, Island School, and Hong Kong International School. She graduated from Princeton University in 1983 with a Bachelor of Arts degree in Art and Archaeology. Chao lives in Honolulu with her husband, John Falzarano, a retired physician.

Chao had focused her senior thesis at Princeton on the Qing dynasty landscape artist Wang Hui and while researching Remembering Shanghai discovered a link to her grandfather, the collector Sun Bosheng. In 2018, during Chao's 35th reunion, the Princeton University Art Museum mounted an exhibition of landscapes by Wang Hui and invited her to speak. Chao's maternal uncle, Sun Shufen was author of 55 books in China, including several based on their family, notably a trilogy about his father, grandfather, and great-grandfather: Baofashijia (1995), Fengyuyangchang (1996), and Baizhuzhichong (1997)

== Career ==
Chao spent 30 years working in brand marketing in Asia, including at Hill & Knowlton, where she was Manager in Beijing and Group Manager in Hong Kong (1983–1989); management roles at Tiffany and Co. in Hong Kong and Honolulu, concluding with Regional Vice President—Pacific (1990–1999); and Senior Vice President—North Asia at Burberry Asia Limited (2002–2004). Since 2000, Chao's Honolulu-based marketing consultancy CHAO LLC, has served clients such as Harry Winston, LVMH and CIRCA.

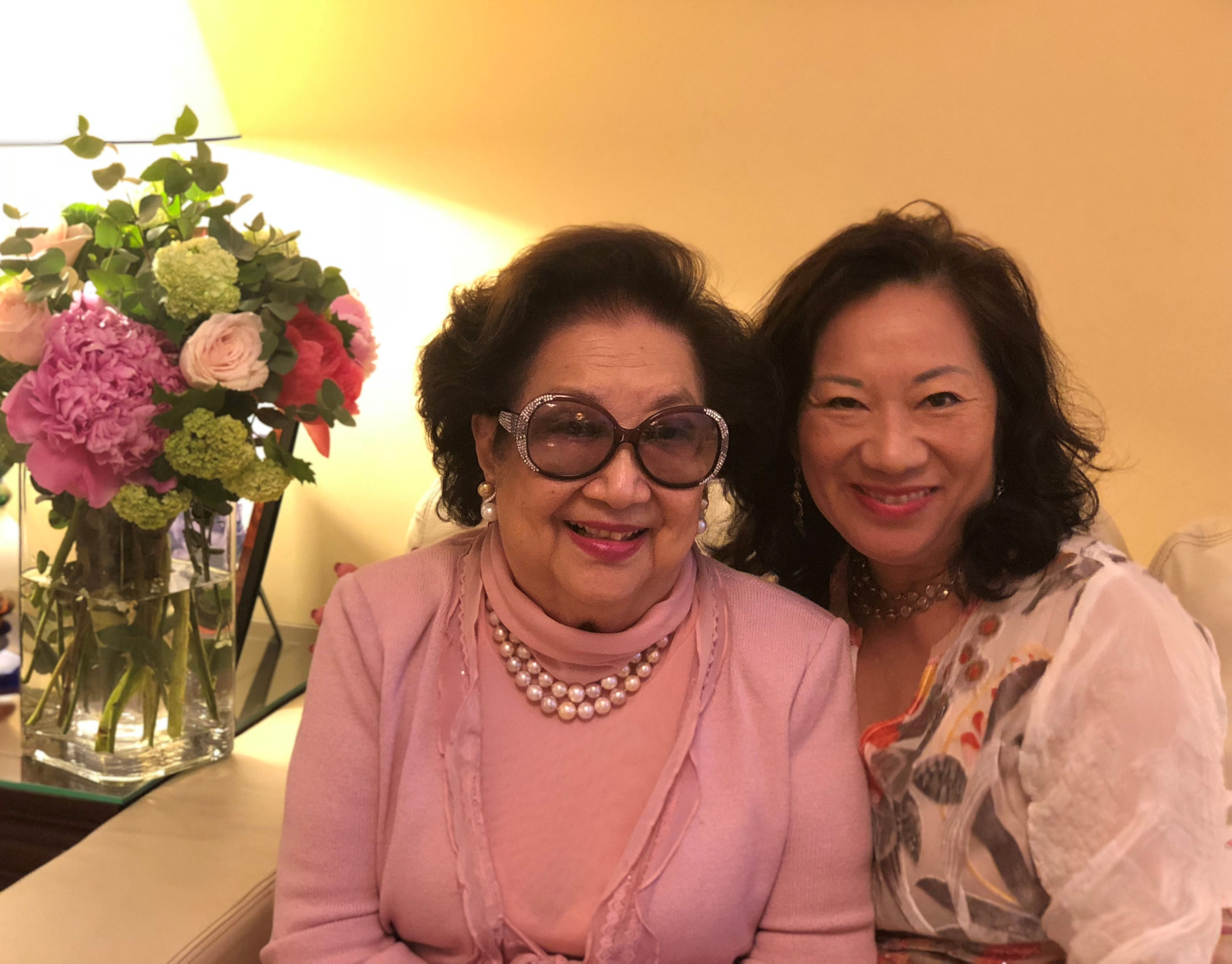
Isabel Sun Chao (left) with Claire Chao in Hong Kong, November 2018.

Published in May 2018, Remembering Shanghai: A Memoir of Socialites, Scholars and Scoundrels covers five generations of the Sun family. The book was republished in October 2021 by Girl Friday Books. Themes include intergenerational relationships within affluent Chinese families in the pre-World War II era and the pressures on wealthy families in Shanghai during the Communist rise to power and subsequent victory.

Remembering Shanghai is being adapted into a drama series.

== Awards ==
- Writer's Digest Self-Published Book Award GRAND PRIZE
- Independent Press Awards MEMOIR, NEW NON-FICTION
- BIBA Best Indie Book Award MEMOIR
- Sarton Women's Book Awards MEMOIR Finalist
