= Kevin Poon =

Hong Kong fashion designer

- 潘世亨
- Born: Hong Kong
- Occupations: Entrepreneur, fashion designer, event organizer
- Known for: WOAW Gallery, Elephant Grounds, DJ, District Distribution, CLOT, JUICE
- Spouse: Fiona McLeish (married 2020-present)

Kevin Poon (潘世亨) is a Chinese entrepreneur and art curator. He is the founder of WOAW Gallery, distribution company District, and shareholder of CLOT, JUICE, and other Hong Kong businesses.

== Early life and education ==
Poon was born in Hong Kong in 1981, and moved to Chicago in the United States when he was three years old. He returned to Hong Kong when he was five briefly before moving to Vancouver. Returning to Hong Kong again, Poon studied at the Hong Kong International School before moving to North America after graduating high school to attend Pepperdine University in California. While in Los Angeles, Poon worked as an intern for Interscope Records when he was 19 years old and later earned a degree in finance from Pepperdine. He returned to Hong Kong in 2003 to start his own business with Edison Chen, creating CLOT.

== Career ==
Poon and childhood friend Edison Chen founded fashion label CLOT in 2003 shortly after Poon graduated from Pepperdine University. Aside from fashion, CLOT has tapped into various aspects of youth culture including music, art and design. In 2004, Poon opened JUICE, a retail store specializing in designer streetwear and accessories. By 2006, CLOT had entered the American marketplace.

CLOT has collaborated with brands such as Nike, VLONE, sacai, Fear of God, Adidas, Converse, Lacoste, Headporter, Pepsi, and with American hip-hop artist Kanye West. The brand developed a shoe for Nike called the “Kiss of Death”, the first ever collaboration between Nike and a Hong Kong-based label.
