= Edison Chen =

Hong Kong actor and singer (born 1980)

- 陳冠希
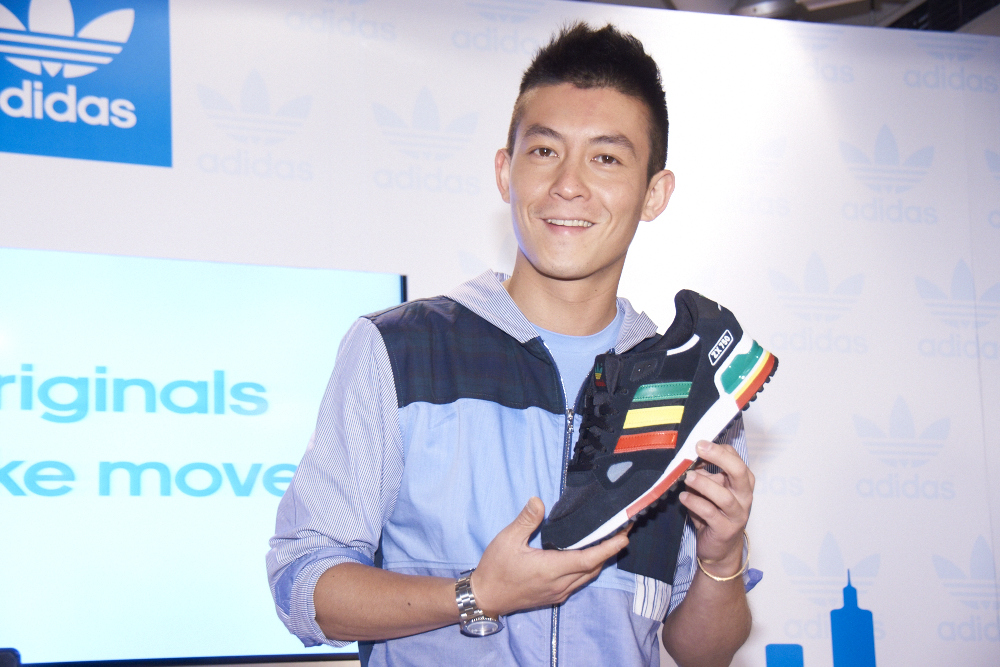
- Chen in 2012
- Born: Chen Hing-wah; 7 October 1980 (age 46); Vancouver, British Columbia, Canada
- Citizenship: Canada; Hong Kong
- Occupations: Singer; rapper; actor; entrepreneur; fashion designer
- Years active: 1999–present
- Partner: Qin Shupei (2015–present)
- Children: Alaia Chen
- Musical career
- Also known as: EDC
- Origin: Hong Kong
- Genres: Hong Kong hip hop, Chinese hip hop, Cantopop, Mandopop
- Instrument: Vocals
- Labels: Clot Media Division, EEG

Chen Koon-hei
- Traditional Chinese: 陳冠希
- Simplified Chinese: 陈冠希
Transcriptions
Standard Mandarin
- Hanyu Pinyin: Chén Guànxī
Yue: Cantonese
- Yale Romanization: Chàhn Gunhēi
- Jyutping: Can4 Gun3hei1
- Hong Kong Romanisation: Chan Koon-hei
- Macau Romanization: Chan Kun-hei

Chan Hing-wah
- Traditional Chinese: 陳興華
- Simplified Chinese: 陈兴华
Transcriptions
Standard Mandarin
- Hanyu Pinyin: Chén Xīnghuá
Yue: Cantonese
- Jyutping: Can4 Hing1waa4
- Hong Kong Romanisation: Chan Hing-wah
- Macau Romanization: Chan Heng-wa
- Website: clot.com

Edison Chen Koon-hei (Chinese: 陳冠希, born Chen Hing-wah on 7 October 1980) is a Canadian-born Hong Kong actor, singer, rapper, fashion designer and entrepreneur. In 1999, at the age of 19, Chen was scouted to shoot a credit card commercial with Leon Lai. He made his debut in the music industry in 2000 and starred in films such as Infernal Affairs (2002) and Initial D (2005). In 2008, he withdrew from the entertainment industry "indefinitely" following a sex photo scandal, but made a comeback in 2010.

== Early life ==
Along with his two older sisters, Chen was born in Vancouver, British Columbia, Canada, and is of Chinese and one-eighth Portuguese descent. Chen's father is Edward Chen (陳澤民), a Hong Kong entertainment industry mogul famously known as "Ninth Brother" (九哥). He is of Shanghai ancestry on his father's side.

He was a student at R.C. Palmer Secondary School in Richmond, British Columbia and also attended Hong Kong International School, where he was a classmate with Nicholas Tse.

Chen's native language is English. He is also fluent in Cantonese and Mandarin, which he primarily records music in. He speaks conversational Japanese as a result of his early training to be a Hong Kong idol, and he knows some basic Khmer since he learnt it when portraying a Cambodian assassin in the 2006 Hong Kong movie Dog Bite Dog.

== Career ==
=== Film ===
In 1999, a talent scout approached Chen while he was clubbing with friends in Hong Kong and asked him to film a commercial. He was first featured in Leon Lai's Citibank commercial. In the same year, he also starred alongside Cecilia Cheung in a commemorative subway commercial.

From then on, his career began with the Japanese film Dead or Alive 2: Birds. He made his Hong Kong film debut in the film Gen-Y Cops in 2000. He starred in many popular films including Infernal Affairs, Infernal Affairs II, Initial D, and Dog Bite Dog. Determined to expand his horizons to countries around the world, he also starred in the Japanese drama Under the Same Moon. In 2006, he made his American debut as a Hong Kong journalist in The Grudge 2. He was offered a small role in The Fast and the Furious: Tokyo Drift but he declined. His final film in Hong Kong as of 2013 is The Sniper, which was filmed before his photo scandal.

He also filmed a cameo as a thug in The Dark Knight but because of the scandal, his role was reduced and was seen very briefly as a receptionist instead. Some reports states that he was originally cast to play Lau, a corrupted Chinese accountant, which was played by Chin Han. He made his comeback in an Asian-American film called Almost Perfect. On 28 October, during a fashion event in Beijing, Chen announced that he would be starring in Initial D 2. The filming of the movie was scheduled to begin in 2011 but it has been delayed indefinitely. In 2014, he made a brief comeback to the Hong Kong film industry in Golden Chickensss. After eight years of doing short roles, he is officially making a comeback to the entertainment business after he was spotted filming for Lou Ye's new project in Guangzhou in April 2016.

=== Music ===
In 2000, at the age of 20, Chen landed a record deal with Emperor Entertainment Group. It took him a number of successful album releases before he was given the opportunity to produce a hip hop album. His first hip-hop release was in February 2004, called Please Steal This Album backed by MC Yan and Singaporean musician Hanjin Chen. Several singles from the album topped local pop charts. Chen mentioned the difficulty of fitting in Hong Kong, where Cantopop dominates, but said that hip hop has a great potential.

He is featured on M-Flo's album, Cosmicolor, on the track "LOVE ME, HATE THE GAME" with Chen, Thaitanium and Ryohei Yamamoto.

After Chen's comeback in late 2009 he began work on his next album titled Confusion. The record includes a feature by well-known Taiwanese rapper MC HotDog, as well as famous singers Sammi Cheng and Jay Chou.

Chen released two Cantonese hip-hop albums in collaboration with Hong Kong rappers MC Yan and Chef entitled 三角度 (3 Corners) and 三角度(二) (3 Corners II) in 2012 and 2015 respectively.

=== Fashion and business founder ===
Chen's foray into the fashion industry accompanied his rising success as a young pop icon. Chen, along with partners Kevin Poon and Billy Ip, became the founders of CLOT Inc., a clothing company geared toward youth culture, in 2003. The company has collaborated with many big clothing companies, such as Adidas, Nike, A Bathing Ape, Subcrew and Disney. CLOT operates multiple stores worldwide through its retail component JUICE STORE, including in Hong Kong, Los Angeles, mainland China and Taiwan.

=== Multimedia company ===
In February 2007, he invested $10 million HKD to open his own multi-media company, Clot Media Division, which plans to produce movies, commercials and music albums. In June 2007, he released a Mandarin album, Allow Me to Re-Introduce Myself (讓我再次介紹我自己), with tracks produced by legendary hip-hop artist Kanye West, as well as producers Just Blaze and Clinton Sparks.

=== Community work ===
As early as 2001 Chen had appeared in Vancouver charity shows. He has also been a supporter for the gay and lesbian community in Hong Kong, including being voted as an icon in 2001.

In 2007 he was invited by Be@rbrick toys for a charity event in Harbour City, Hong Kong. The charity proceeds were donated to "Hong Kong Blood Cancer Foundation".

=== Video game voice work ===
He provided English and Cantonese voice work as a Sun On Yee triad member (inspired by the real life triad Sun Yee On) named Jackie Ma, a major character in the 2012 open world action-adventure video game Sleeping Dogs. Sleeping Dogs is set in the city of Hong Kong, and also features voice work from other established actors including Will Yun Lee, Emma Stone and Lucy Liu.

== Incidents ==
=== 2004 victim of assault ===
In March 2004, two male teenagers assaulted Chen in the Central District of Hong Kong. The two teenagers mocked Chen with dance moves outside a record store. Immediately following the dance taunt, both of the teenagers punched Chen. Upon doing so the two teenagers fled the scene, and Chen gave chase. Chen eventually caught up to the two individuals as they were trying to board a bus. They were turned over to Hong Kong Police. As a result of the incident, Chen reported that he sprained his ankle and that his cheekbone and ear were also injured. Chen declined to press charges and the two individuals were released.

Their lives would be ruined if I pressed charges. Their mother asked me to forgive them. I went to the hospital and got checked out and since it's just bruises, I decided to let it go.

— Edison Chen

=== 2007 taxi incident ===
Chen drove to his home after midnight 9 March 2007. The gate was blocked by a Toyota Crown Comfort taxi that had just dropped off its passengers. The taxi driver then signaled Chen to move away so he could pull out, clearing the way for Chen to enter. Chen's security guard told the taxi driver to pull over so that Chen could pass. The taxi driver insulted the security guard. Chen proceeded to have an argument with the taxi driver. Despite the presence of the security guard and other witnesses, he got out of his car and kicked the taxi several times, denting it and breaking all its windows. He was subsequently charged by the police. On the basis of these charges he was convicted and placed on a one-year good behavior bond. He was also fined; the taxi company was granted HK$4,700 in compensation for the damage inflicted to the car.

=== 2008 photo scandal ===
In January 2008, Chen was involved in a widely publicised sex scandal when sexually explicit nude photographs of himself taken four years earlier became widely circulated on the Internet. Chen was never accused of uploading the photos himself and a computer technician was later sentenced for accessing Chen's computer during a repair. Celebrities implicated in the scandal included 8 victims: Cecilia Cheung, Gillian Chung, Bobo Chan, Candice Chan (陳思慧), Vincy Yeung (楊永晴), Mandy Chen (陳育嬬) and Rachel Ngan (顏穎思). Nude photos of Edison's ex-girlfriend, Vincy Yeung, were also made public and the future of their relationship was the subject of intense media gossip.

Hong Kong police have stated that they confiscated a collection of sex-related photos that involve six other identifiable females and other unidentifiable males.

Initially the authenticity of the photos was denied, and digital manipulation was used as the primary explanation for the pictures. However, Hong Kong police and Photoshop experts argued that the photos were in fact real and not digitally altered. This brought about a serious reaction towards all parties involved in the scandal. As a result, Chen made a public apology in English to the Hong Kong people and the women involved and indirectly admitted his role and expressed remorse and subsequently announced his indefinite departure from the Hong Kong entertainment industry at a press conference.

Due to the scandal, the Google search engine rankings for 2008 resulted in Chen's Chinese name being the number 1 search term in China, and number 3 in Taiwan. Chen was runner-up to US president-elect Barack Obama in the Hong Kong Person of 2008 poll by government-run RTHK radio, with just under 30 percent of votes in the Person of the Year. On 1 June 2009, Chen spoke openly about the sex photo scandal for the first time since the scandal broke in an interview with TalkAsia on CNN. In the interview he reveals his side of the scandal and how he endured criticisms from the public, the media, and from the individuals affected by the case.

=== 2011 photo scandal ===
Three years later, Chen was involved in another photo scandal, this time with a 16-year-old Hong Kong model Cammi Tse. Their relationship was revealed after photos of them together hugging and kissing each other were leaked online and later, the 16-year-old model stated that her phone was lost. It was later revealed that Chen had sent text messages to Tse, asking her to pose for him in swimsuits and school uniforms. Tse confirmed that there were no nude photos. Tse reported that she lost her virginity to Chen and adding on that he filmed a two-minute video of her in the bedroom and he also bought sexy lingerie for her.

== Personal life ==
From 2006 to May 2011, Chen was in a relationship with Vincy Yeung, the daughter of Hong Kong tycoon Ricky Yeung Chiu Sing and niece of Albert Yeung, the chairman of Emperor Group under which Chen was signed. In 2011, Chen briefly dated 16-year-old Cammi Tse, a member of the modeling group Fantasy. On October 30, 2011, their relationship was revealed and ended when the photos of the two kissing surfaced. In a 2014 interview, Tse said, “At the time, many of my friends told me he was a playboy with multiple girlfriends. Later, I found out he had 20 girlfriends during that period.” She also said that the intimate photos of her and Chen were only in their possession, and she did not understand how they were leaked to the media.

In 2015, Chen began dating Chinese model and actress Qin Shupei. In May 2016, their relationship was made public. However, Qin's husband, Leigh Gow, the managing director of Huayi Brothers Fashion Media, claimed they were still married and accused Qin of infidelity. Qin responded on Weibo, stating that she and Gow had already signed a divorce agreement prepared by Gow's lawyer. On March 5, 2017, Chen and Qin's daughter, Alaia, was born. The couple married the same year and have lived in Los Angeles, USA.

== Discography ==
=== Albums ===
| Year | Album | Label | Notes |
|---|---|---|---|
| 5 June 2001 | Visual Diary | EEG | Cantonese album |
| Taiwan 2 November 2001; South Korea 17 March 2026 | Ed Is On | EEG | Mandarin album |
| 20 December 2001 | Peace and Love | EEG | Cantonese album |
| 3 July 2002 | Break Through | EEG | Cantonese album |
| 29 August 2002 | Transition | EEG | Mandarin album |
| 26 February 2004 | Please Steal This Album | EEG | Cantonese album |
| 4 January 2005 | Hazy: The 144 Hour Project | EEG | Cantonese album |
| 15 June 2007 (Version 1); 10 August 2007 (Version 2) | Let Me Re-Introduce Myself 讓我再次介紹我自己 | Clot Media Division | Mandarin album |
| 28 December 2010 | CONFUSION | Clot Media Division | Mandarin/Cantonese album |
| 27 July 2012 | 3 Corners 三角度 | East Asia Music | Cantonese collaboration album with MC Yan and Chef |
| 20 September 2013 | Super Brothers | East Asia Music | Mandarin collaboration album with MC HotDog |
| 15 August 2015 | 3 Corners II 三角度(二) | Clot Media Division | Cantonese collaboration album with MC Yan and Chef |
| 11 January 2018 | This Little Monkey: Part 1 一只猴子 第一部曲 | Clot Media Division | Mandarin album |
| 15 August 2018 | This Little Monkey: Part 3 一只猴子 第三部曲 | Clot Media Division | Mandarin album |

=== Mixtapes ===
| Year | Title | Label | Notes |
|---|---|---|---|
| 12 May 2006 | 69FM Mixtape | East Asia Music | Cantonese/English/Mandarin mixtape |

=== Extended plays ===
| Year | Title | Label | Notes |
|---|---|---|---|
| 30 November 2000 | Edison Chen (EP) 陳冠希 | EEG | Cantonese EP |
| 21 August 2001 | Ultraman Gaia 超人佳亞 | EEG | Cantonese EP |
| 29 September 2017 | This Little Monkey: Part 2 一只猴子 第二部曲 | Clot Media Division | Mandarin EP |

=== Compilation albums ===
| Year | Title | Label | Notes |
|---|---|---|---|
| 13 February 2003 | Hits or Misses | EEG | Cantonese compilation |
| 21 December 2005 | The Best Collection | EEG | Cantonese compilation |

=== Non-album singles ===
| Year | Song | Language |
|---|---|---|
| 4 January 2005 | "Waste of Time Part 3" 嘥氣 Part 3 | Cantonese |
| 18 September 2012 | "For Love" | Mandarin |
| 31 December 2012 | "What Time Is It?" 幾點? | Mandarin |
| 22 July 2022 | "Wave" 浪 | Cantonese |
| 28 October 2023 | "GODzilla" | Cantonese |

== Filmography ==
=== Films ===
- 2000 – Dead or Alive 2: Birds (Japan)
- 2000 – Gen Y Cops
- 2001 – Final Romance
- 2001 – Dummy mother, Without a Baby (玉女添丁)
- 2001 – Dance of a Dream
- 2002 – Princess D (想飛)
- 2002 – Nine Girls and a Ghost
- 2002 – Infernal Affairs
- 2003 – The Twins Effect
- 2003 – The Medallion (Cameo)
- 2003 – Infernal Affairs II
- 2003 – The Spy Dad (絕種鐵金剛)
- 2003 – Infernal Affairs III (Cameo)
- 2004 – Sex and the Beauties (性感都市)
- 2004 – Moving Targets (2004 新紮師兄)
- 2004 – Life, Translated (時差7小時)
- 2004 – Jiang Hu
- 2004 – The Twins Effect II
- 2004 – A-1 Headline
- 2005 – Initial D
- 2005 – Under The Same Moon (同じ月を見ている) (Japan)
- 2006 – Dog Bite Dog
- 2006 – The Grudge 1.5 (咒怨1.5) (Short)
- 2006 – The Grudge 2
- 2007 – Trivial Matters (破事兒)
- 2008 – The Dark Knight (Cameo)
- 2009 – The Sniper
- 2009 – Coweb (Cameo)
- 2012 – Almost Perfect
- 2014 – Golden Chicken 3
- 2014 – Streets of Macao
- 2015 – Waiting
- 2016 – Good Take, Too!
- 2018 – The Shadow Play

=== Voiceovers ===
- 2001 – Cats & Dogs (Voice only, Cantonese version)
- 2007 – Shrek the Third (Voice only, Cantonese version)
- 2012 – Sleeping Dogs

=== TV series ===
- 2002 – Feel 100%
- 2003 – Hearts of Fencing as guest
- 2005 – Eight Heroes

== Awards ==
=== Film and TV awards ===
- 2001 – 20th Hong Kong Film Awards – Nominee – Best New Performer for Gen-Y Cops
- 2003 – China Fashion Awards – Winner – Character Figure
- 2003 – Star Fighter Super Festival – Creative Breakthrough Actor Award (winner)
- 2004 – China Fashion Awards – Winner – Asia Breakthrough Artist

=== Music awards ===
==== 2000–2001 ====
- 2000 – Jade Solid Gold Best Ten Music Awards – Winner – Most Popular New Artist (Male) (dual gold with Louis Koo)
- 2001 – Jade Solid Gold Best Ten Music Awards Winner – 4 Stations Best Song/Four Channel Award (silver)
- 2001 – TVB8 Mandarin Music Awards – Winner – Top 10 Songs/Winner – Best New Singer

==== 2002 ====
- 2002 – Jade Solid Gold Best Ten Music Awards – Winner – Favorite Online Song – I never told you (bronze)
- 2002 – RTHK Top 10 Gold Songs Awards – Winner – Best Song
- 2002 – CMA Chinese Music Awards – Winner – Favorite New Singer
- 2002 – Top Chinese Music Awards – Winner – Outstanding New Singer
- 2002 – Music Pioneer Chart Awards – Winner – Favorite Singer
- 2002 – TVB8 Mandarin Music Awards – Winner – Best Song

==== 2003 ====
- 2003 – MusicRadio China TOP Ranking Chart – Winner – Gold Song
- 2003 – Metro Radio Hits Music Awards Presentation – Best Original Song – Number Nine
- 2003 – Guoyuli Awards Ceremony – Best Singer
- 2003 – Guoyuli Awards Ceremony – Best Song – "I Never Told You"

==== 2004 ====
- 2004 – Music Pioneer Chart Awards – Winner – Favorite Singer
- 2004 – Jade Solid Gold Best Ten Music Awards – Winner – Outstanding Performance

==== 2005 ====
- 2005 – 5th Chinese Music Media Awards Best Hip Hop artist (winner)

==== 2006 ====
- 2006 – 6th Chinese Music Media Awards Best Hip Hop artist (winner)

==== 2011 ====
- 2011 – Golden Melody Awards – Nominee – Best Music Video – Mr. Sandman

=== Special awards ===
- 2000 – East TOUCH magazine – Sportsman cable female election (nomination)
- 2000 – East TOUCH magazine Best newcomer (winner)
- 2007 – BQ Celebrity Score Awards – Nominee – Best Fashion Artist
- 2007 – Sina "2007 Guangdong Ten Network Entertainment festival" Best Fashion Music Artists (winner)
- 2011 – MTV Super Festival Annual Trend of Most Style Artist Award (winner)
