= Visual Diary =

Studio album by Edison Chen
- Released: 10 May 2001
- Genre: Canto-pop
- Label: EEG

Edison Chen chronology
Edison Chen (EP) (2000)	Visual Diary (2001)	Ultraman Gaia (2001)

Visual Diary is the first full Cantonese-language album by Hong Kong pop singer-actor Edison Chen. On this album, His genre focuses mainly in the mainstream pop combining of pop-rock flavor and RnB.

== Background ==
The song "New Stimulus" was used for his Pepsi campaign both sung in Cantonese and Mandarin under the title "Thirst". The song "Release" features label mate Joey Yung singing the chorus parts.

He collaborated with foreign musicians/producers including Korean singer Kang Ta for penning the song "回頭路" (Going Back).

"When Love'S Gonna End" was the only English song in the album.

== Track listing ==
1. 愛火 Fire Of Love
2. 放任 Release (featuring Joey Yung)
3. 緋聞 Gossip
4. 請早說 Please Say It Early
5. 雙手插袋 Both Hands In Pockets
6. 新刺激 New Stimulus
7. When love's gonna end
8. 凍飲 Cold Drink
9. 回頭路 Going Back
10. 解渴 Thirst (Mandarin Version of "New Stimulus")
11. 心中最愛 Mind's Favorites

== Limited Editions ==
Visual Diary Version 2 album comes with a candid photos of Chen and a live album of his debut concert tour "EDISON 64" in which was held in Japan.
