= Hong Kong International School =

Private international school in Hong Kong

Coordinates: 22.23789°N 114.22354°E

- Repulse Bay and Tai Tam Red Hill, Hong Kong

Information
- Type: Private
- Religious affiliation: Christian
- Denomination: Lutheran
- Established: 19 September 1966; 59 years ago
- Head of school: Ron Roukema (Interim)
- Staff: 500
- Faculty: 250
- Grades: R-12
- Enrollment: Over 3,000 students
- Colors: Dark Red, White, Navy
- Mascot: Torch the Dragon
- Publication: Chuan Long, Ingenium, Theory of Everything
- Newspaper: Junto
- Yearbook: Orientale
- High School Principal: Aimmie Kellar
- Middle School Principal: Casey Faulknall
- Upper Primary Principal: Duncan FitzGerald
- Lower Primary Principal: Elizabeth Elizardi
- Operator: Hong Kong International School Association Limited
- Website: www.hkis.edu.hk

Hong Kong International School
- Traditional Chinese: 香港國際學校
- Simplified Chinese: 香港国际学校
Transcriptions
Standard Mandarin
- Hanyu Pinyin: Xiānggǎng Guójì Xuéxiào
Yue: Cantonese
- Jyutping: hoeng1 gong2 gwok3 zai3 hok6 haau6

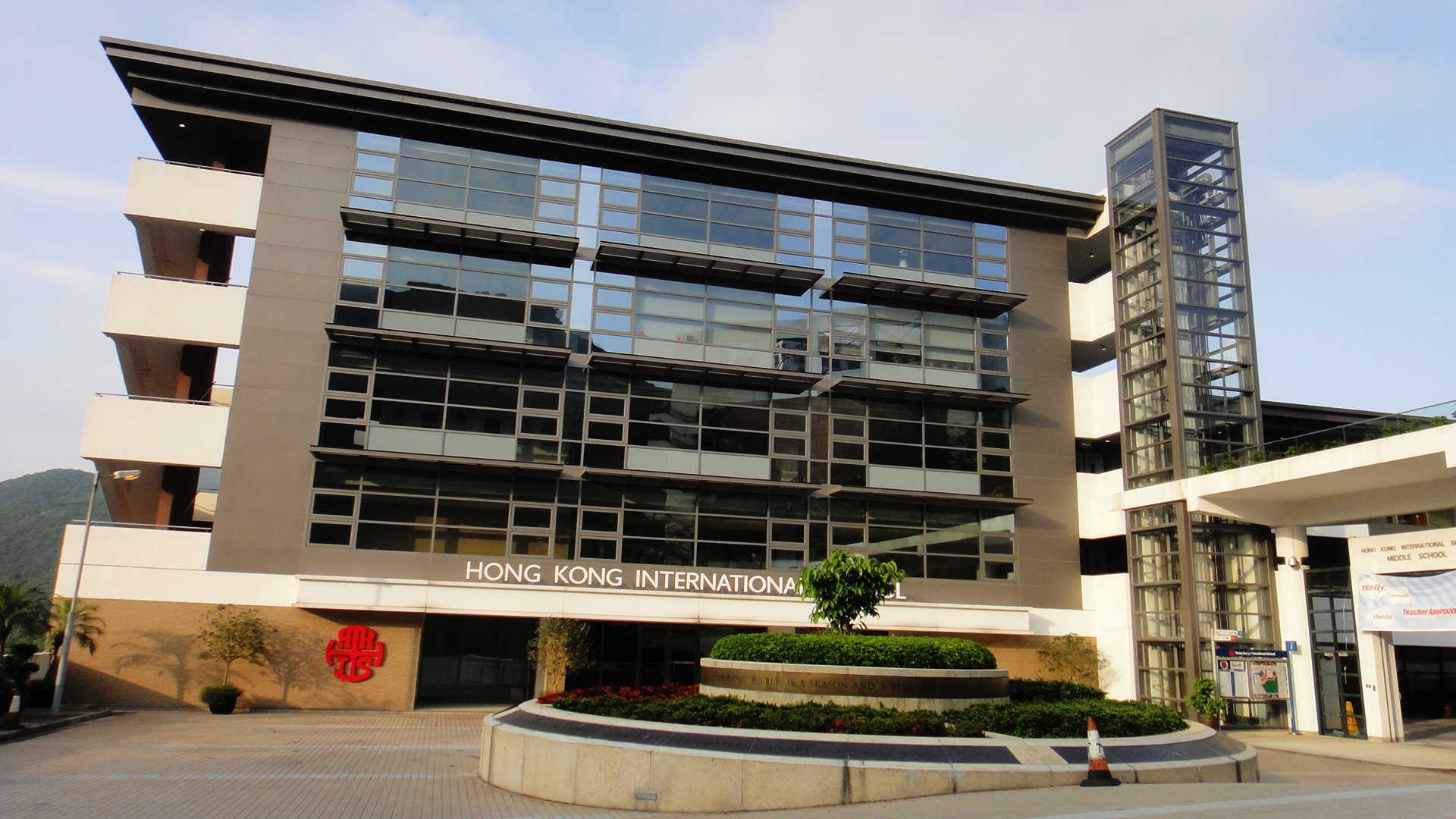
Front view of the Hong Kong International School (HKIS) Middle School Campus

Hong Kong International School (HKIS) is a co-educational private international school in Hong Kong with campuses in Tai Tam and Repulse Bay, serving students from Reception 1 to Grade 12. The Repulse Bay campus houses the Lower and Upper Primary Divisions, while Tai Tam houses the Middle and High School Divisions.

Hong Kong International School is operated by the Hong Kong International School Association Limited (HKISAL), accredited by the Western Association of Schools and Colleges (WASC) and is a member of the East Asia Regional Conference of Overseas Schools (EARCOS). HKIS participates in the Asia Pacific Activities Conference (APAC).

== History ==
=== 1964–2010 ===
In 1964, a Hong Kong-based committee of the Lutheran Church – Missouri Synod (LCMS) first submitted a proposal to have the school built. The Repulse Bay Lutheran Church and School Project conducted a survey of Americans in July 1964. The results showed the majority of respondents were in favor of establishing an American school, with 100 new families anticipated to arrive each year.

In 1965, the Board of Missions of the LCMS and the Hong Kong Education Department approved a land grant and loan for the construction of the school. The LCMS matched the land grant with its own grant and loan, and the American business community in Hong Kong raised additional capital.

With the establishment of regional headquarters of the Dow Chemical Company and Pan Am in Hong Kong, a number of American families arrived in 1966. The HKIS Board of Managers agreed to establish and open an "HKIS Provisional Elementary School" program for the 1966–1967 school year in a leased apartment building at Chung Hom Kok with a capacity for 195 students.

In April 1966, the groundbreaking ceremony was held for the first permanent school building in Repulse Bay, with a capacity for 630 pupils. The campus included a cafeteria, library, and gymnasium. It became the first school in Hong Kong with a U.S. education program. The school facilities were completed in 1967, with the Church of All Nations also located on the campus.

HKIS officially opened in Repulse Bay in 1967, with more than 600 students in kindergarten through to grade 12. By 1969 this had grown to 900 students from 26 nationalities, with 80% being U.S. citizens. The campus was as dedicated in 1975. In the 1970s the school had both American students and students of other nationalities. In 1971, HKIS became WASC accredited, five years after the school opened.

In 1974, the HKSA was incorporated as the operator of HKIS.

In 1985, the Hong Kong government approved a land grant in Tai Tam. The groundbreaking ceremony for the new campus was held in 1986. The campus was completed in 1989, in time for the 1988–1989 school year. Hong Kong Governor Sir David Wilson dedicated the new campus. In 1989, the school had grown to 1,7111 students across its two campuses.

In 2001, the student count was 2,650. That same year, Charles Dull announced that he would not stay on after the end of his period as the head of the school. William Wehrenberg succeeded him. Wehrenberg left his position in 2004.

In 2003, HKIS and BrainPop collaborated on an episode of the latter about SARS/MERS.

By 2004 the school had established an extracurricular summer school that was one of the largest in Hong Kong.

The Middle School completed a new Middle School Annex overlooking Tai Tam Bay in 2009 or 2010, including administrative offices, a boardroom, Modern Languages classrooms and a seminar/meeting space. The Middle School has also developed 5 houses, Tai Tam, Peak, Lantau, Central, Shek-O, and Lamma.

=== 2010–present ===
HKIS announced in June 2011 that it would be redeveloping the Lower Primary school building in Repulse Bay for three years, with the old building being leveled during the process. In 2013, HKIS announced that lower primary students would move to the Tai Tam campus starting in the 2014–2015 school year. Offices and support staff rooms were retrofitted into classrooms, with space in the Middle School being turned over to Lower Primary. Work began in 2014, with the new campus featuring an indoor swimming pool, auditorium, gymnasium, learning spaces, and housing.

The school undertook a complete renovation of the Lower and Upper Primary Campus in Repulse Bay in 2017 and 2018, respectively. The Lower Primary school received six new playgrounds, swimming pool, auditorium, cafeteria, and Wonder Lab. The Upper Primary school received major renovations with all classrooms increasing in size and including art, science, and Design Garage rooms, a Chinese Cultural Center, cafeteria, multiple purpose sports room, and two-story indoor place area.

The school was listed by The Schools Index as one of the world's 150 leading schools and amongst top 15 in China and Southeast Asia in 2021.

According to the South China Morning Post, in 2022, the relationship between the LCMS in the United States, and school operator HKISAL began to deteriorate after LCMS asked for a site tour of the Repulse Bay campus with property agents to assess the value of the land. The LCMS planned to sell the school and redevelop the land because the valuation of the campus would be worth as high as US$1.1 billion if it was turned into residential and commercial development.

In 2025, the LCMS moved to assert direct control of the school. In a lawsuit against HKISAL the LCMS demanded the resignation of the entire board of directors, and for the board to be replaced by new members of their own choosing. If this did not happen, they requested the eviction of the existing management company from the grounds so that a new entity could take over the real estate of the school and establish a replacement. After the announcement of the lawsuit, the LCMS opened a website for a Hong Kong Pacific School, the intended replacement of the existing school. The Education Bureau of Hong Kong said they received the application from LCMS, but the bureau will not process the application at this stage due to ongoing litigation. Responding to the lawsuit, the HKIS announced that it remains fully operational and unaffected by the proceedings.

== School structure ==
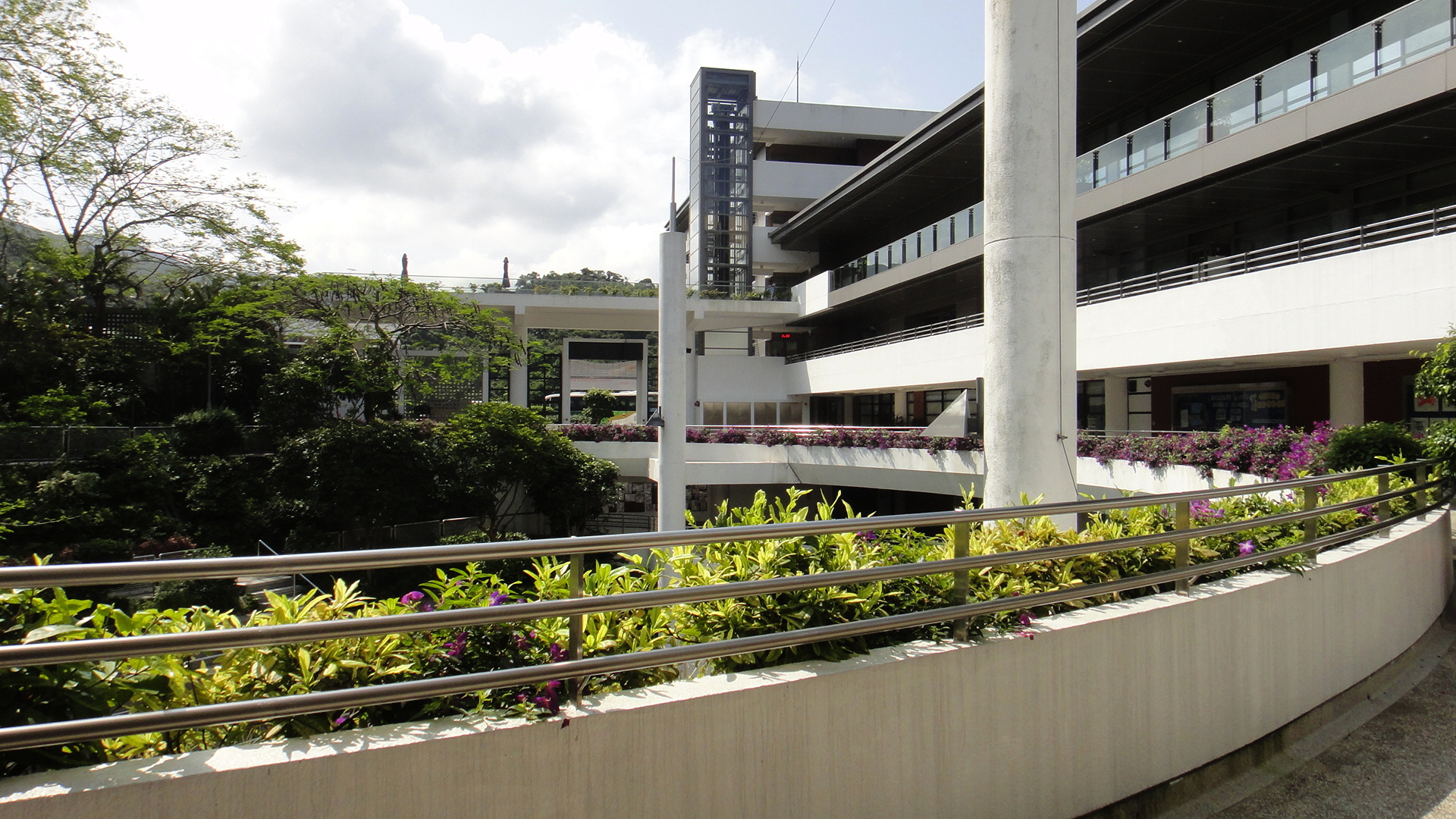
HKIS Middle School

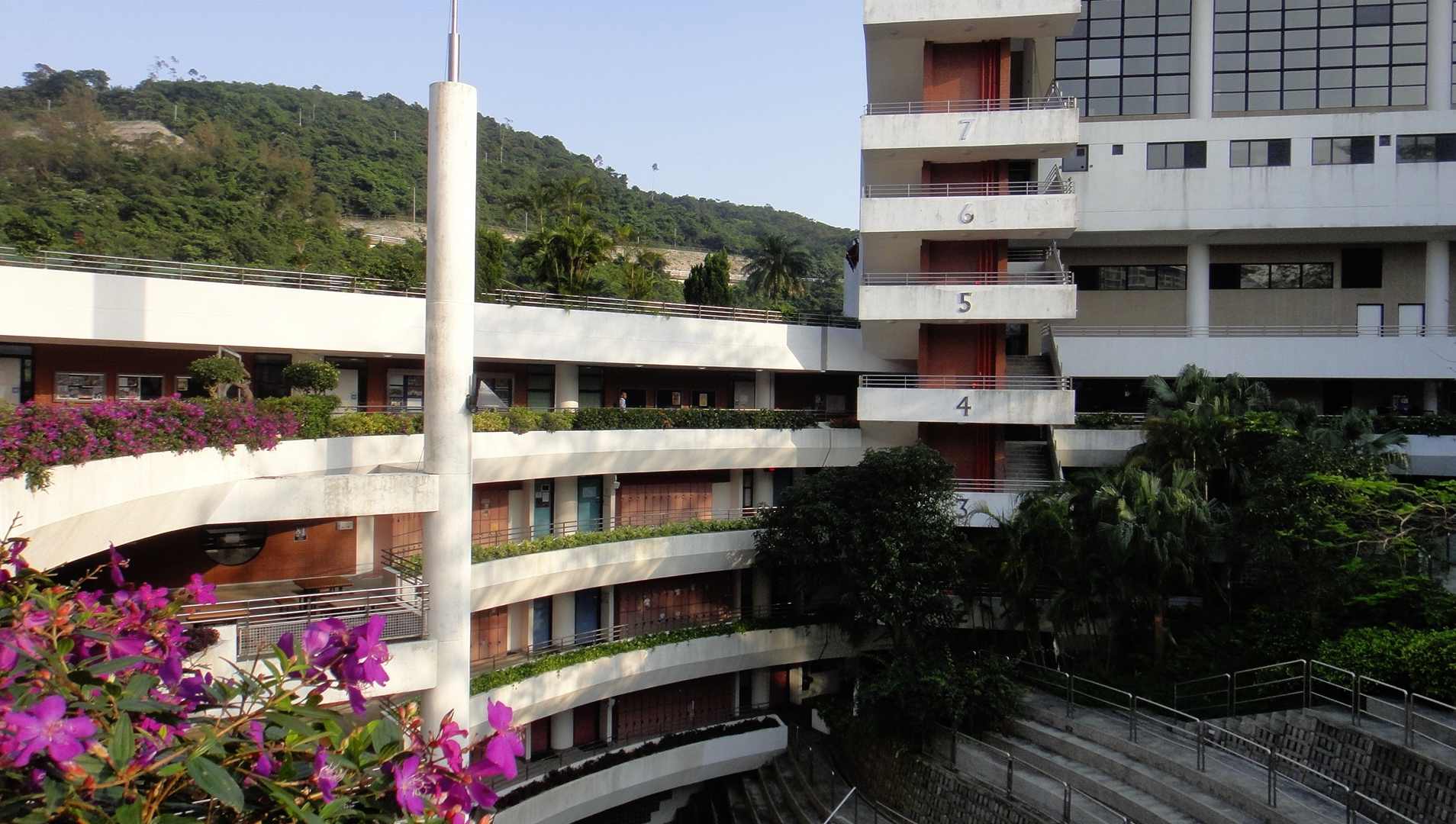
HKIS Middle School

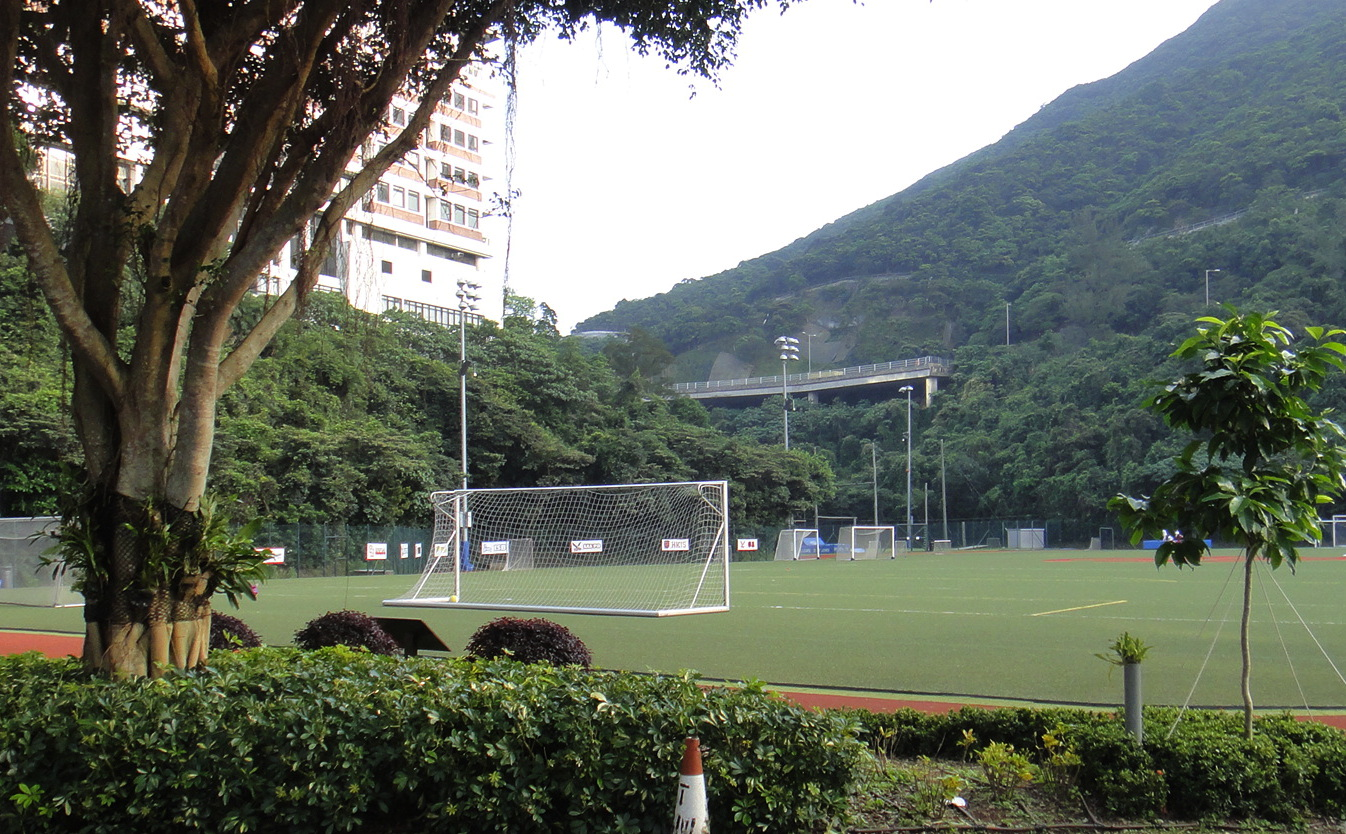
Hong Kong International School grounds

The school is divided into four divisions, all co-educational: Lower Primary (Grades R1-R2 and Grades 1-2), Upper Primary (Grades 3–5), Middle School (Grades 6–8) and High School (Grades 9–12). Lower Primary (LP) and Upper Primary (UP) are housed in the original Repulse Bay campus, while the Middle School (MS) and High School (HS) are in the newer Tai Tam campus.

Each school division has its own faculty administration and student government organization; the student governments are known as the Senate, the Student Leadership Team, and the Student Consul, respectively for the high school, middle school, and upper primary. The entire school is overseen by the head of school.

For the 2023/24 academic year, there were over 2,800 students from over 40 different nationalities, and 500 faculty and staff who occupied the two separate campuses of HKIS. Four libraries housed a total of 200,000 books, periodicals, and technological resources.

In 2000, HKIS had the highest benefits and pay scheme in HKD of all of the international schools in Hong Kong.

== Curriculum ==
The school follows an American curriculum, offering three foreign modern languages in Middle and High School—French, Spanish, and Chinese—and various Advanced Placement courses in High School. Chinese language study is mandatory for R1-G5 students.

Students in the High School are required to study English, mathematics, life and physical sciences, social studies, and a world language. They must also meet the various requirements in fine arts, religion, American history, Asian studies, physical education, and wellness.

High School students in G11 and G12 can enroll in Independent Study and Senior Option, in which students design their own coursework and present their studies to faculty advisors.

Middle School students in G7 and G8 can enroll in electives including creative computing, religious education, culinary arts, Art Studio A and Studio B, performing arts, strings, band, physical education, and other electives. All students are enrolled in maths, science, social studies, and language arts. Middle school students in G6 cannot enroll in electives but can still choose among strings, band, and choir for the required musical topic. Additionally, they can also enroll in Spanish or Chinese. They also have "SPICES" which are a rotation of the electives in Grades 7 and 8.

=== Fine arts ===
At least one arts credit is required for graduation from HKIS, with at least one half-credit course in performance/studio arts and, if only the minimum requirement is met, a one half-credit fine arts survey course.

==== Performing arts ====
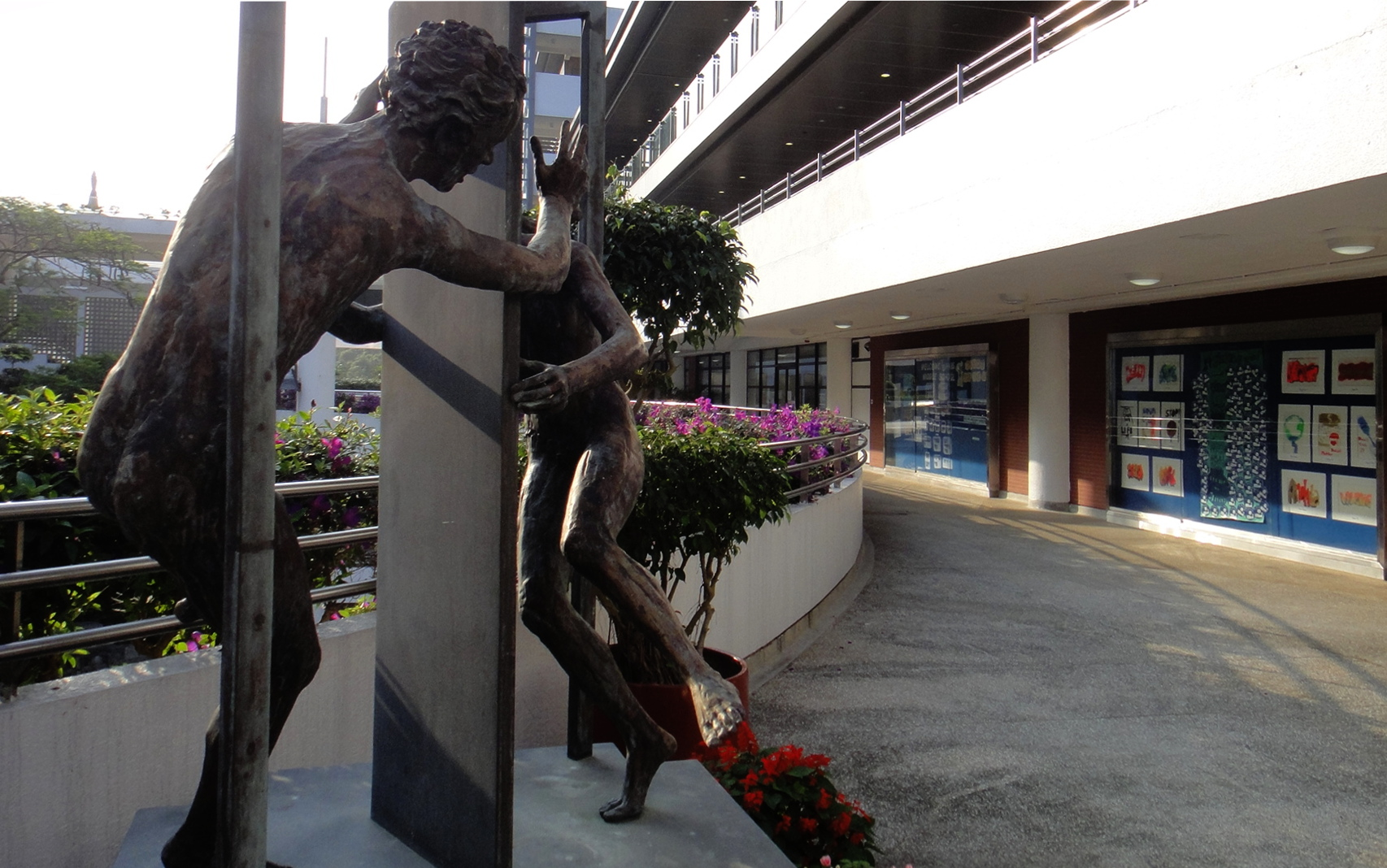
A statue in the Hong Kong International School

HKIS is a member of the Association for Music in International Schools (AMIS), which hosts honor festivals for students of international schools. Acceptance is highly competitive and HKIS' Middle School and High School bands, choirs, and strings programs have been well represented at AMIS festivals since 2009.

HKIS's high school has also hosted the annual Southeast Asia Honor Band Program, inviting several major schools from the region (e.g., Jakarta and Taipei) to participate. At these festivals, HKIS also provided three honor bands of its own: the Middle School band, the Junior Varsity band, and a Varsity honor band.

In 2005, the High School Wind Ensemble earned first place at the Hong Kong Schools Music Festival. The High School band also travels to various countries for the APAC Festival, where students work with composers such as Robert W. Smith to put on a full-length concert in a few days. This festival has been held in places such as Seoul and Shanghai.

The Middle School band performs twice annually: once publicly, often in Stanley or City Hall, and once privately, usually in the Middle School Gymnasium. Other instrumental programs include the Strings program, which performs twice a year.

In Middle School, there are two performances per year, a musical and a play. Along with these, there are also musical theater classes, drama classes, and classes on theater craft.

HKIS has several choirs: an Upper Primary choir of 60 students, several Middle School choirs totaling over 100 students, and three High School choirs totaling 80 students.

Every year, the Madrigal Singers perform at the American Club's tree-lighting ceremony and the Rugby Sevens, and the Middle School choir sends a contingent to AMIS festivals around the world every year, in locations such as Kuala Lumpur (2012), Jakarta (2010), Scotland (2009), and Paris (2010).

== Technology ==
In 1988, the school began operating its own bulletin board system (BBS), called "Dragon BBS". Additional technological infrastructure was installed around 1994.

In 2010, HKIS became a 1:1 (one laptop, one student) school, offering education in traditional and technological forms. Every student from grade 5 upwards was equipped with an Apple MacBook Pro and, younger students learn using a wide range of software using MacBook Pros, iPods, and iPads that remain at school. In 2013, the school switched to MacBook Airs for students participating in the 1:1 program. Currently all Grades 6 to 12 students are required to bring their own MacBook to school every day. In 2025, the school switched from Google Workspace to Microsoft 365.

== Campuses ==
In 1994, John Haibrook of South China Morning Post described the Tai Tam campus as "reminiscent of a classy, overgrown Italian villa", and that it had an "isolated location". At that time, its capacity was 2,200.

== Notable alumni ==
=== Arts and literature ===
- Charlotte Agell, author of several children books and young adult novels
- Keith Bradsher, Pulitzer-prize winning journalist
- Claire Chao, writer and author
- Janice Y. K. Lee, novelist
- Adi Shankar, filmmaker
- Wesley Tongson, artist
- Cathy Yan, film director

=== Athletics ===
- Joe Alexander, basketball player; drafted eighth overall in the 2008 NBA draft
- Sidney Chu, Olympic short track speed skater; competed at the 2022 Winter Olympics
- Jamie Yeung, Olympic swimmer; competed at the 2020 Summer Olympics

=== Business ===
- Jess Lee, partner at Sequoia Capital and former chief executive officer at Polyvore
- Kevin Poon, entrepreneur, owner of Elephant Grounds
- O.D. Kobo, businessman in the technology sector.

=== Entertainment ===
- Edison Chen, actor and singer
- Loletta Chu, actress and beauty pageant titleholder
- Taku Hirano, percussionist and recording artist
- Maude Latour, singer-songwriter
- Juno Mak, singer and record producer
- Bishop Briggs (Sarah McLaughlin), a singer-songwriter
- Eliza Orlins, reality-show contestant on Survivor: Vanuatu, Survivor: Micronesia, and The Amazing Race 31
- Jason Wade, lead singer of Lifehouse

=== Others ===
- Erik Weihenmayer, first blind person to summit Mt. Everest
