= Dog Bite Dog =

2006 Hong Kong film by Soi Cheang

- Film poster
- Directed by: Soi Cheang
- Written by: Szeto Kam-Yuen; Matt Chow; Melvin Li
- Produced by: Sam Leong; Shin Yoneyama
- Starring: Edison Chen; Sam Lee; Cheung Siu-fai; Wayne Lai; Lam Suet
- Cinematography: Edmund Fung
- Edited by: Angie Lam
- Music by: Ben Cheung; Chung Chi-wing
- Production companies: Art Port; Same Way Production
- Release date: 17 August 2006
- Running time: 109 minutes
- Country: Hong Kong
- Languages: Cantonese; Khmer

Dog Bite Dog (Chinese: 狗咬狗) is a 2006 Hong Kong action crime thriller film directed by Soi Cheang and starring Edison Chen as a brutal Cambodian assassin, desperately trying to evade the police, led by Sam Lee, after completing an assignment in Hong Kong. The film was released in Hong Kong cinemas on 17 August 2006.

== Plot ==
A young Cambodian man who has been trained to fight for money in his country is hired to kill someone in Hong Kong. He performs the hit and then flees from Hong Kong police, who are wrestling with internal problems of a model cop and his son, who is also on the force and who was told by his dad not to become a police officer. The father goes into a coma after being shot, and internal affairs suspects him of dealing drugs on the side.

The assassin then befriends a young girl who is raped and abused by her father. They both plan to get back on a ship to Cambodia but have to get past Hong Kong police, who do everything they can to catch him.

== Reception ==
G4s Asian Underground named Dog Bite Dog a bitter sweet action drama that touched on many emotional levels, but it is not for everyone.

=== Festivals ===
The film played later that year at the Tokyo International Film Festival. In 2007, the film played at the Deauville Asian Film Festival, the Amsterdam Fantastic Film Festival, the New York Asian Film Festival, the Fantasy Film Fest (Germany) and the Fantasia Festival in Montreal.

=== Distribution ===
North American rights to the film were purchased by The Weinstein Company for its Dragon Dynasty DVD line, which released the film on DVD on 23 October 2007.

== Awards and nominations ==
Awards and nominations
Ceremony	Category	Recipient	Outcome
26th Hong Kong Film Awards	Best New Performer	Pei Pei	Nominated
43rd Golden Horse Awards	Best Actor	Sam Lee	Nominated
1st Asian Film Awards	Best Film Editing	Angie Lam	Nominated
8th Deauville Asian Film Festival	Lotus Action Asia	Soi Cheang	Won
9th Golden Trailer Awards	Best Foreign Action Trailer	Dog Bite Dog	Nominated
19th Tokyo International Film Festival	Tokyo Grand Prix	Soi Cheang	Nominated
