= Edison Chen (EP) =

EDISON / 陳冠希同名專輯

EP by Edison Chen
- Released: 30 November 2000
- Genre: Canto-pop
- Length: 27:34
- Label: EEG

Edison Chen chronology
EDISON / 陳冠希同名專輯 (2000)	Visual Diary (2001)

EDISON also known as 陳冠希EDISON was released on November 30, 2000, by Hong Kong pop singer-actor Edison Chen.

== Background ==
The song "Extremely Love Myself" was composed by the Hong Kong legend Leslie Cheung (Edison's idol) 2 years before Cheung died. "Heroes" is the English version of the song 要來便來 (Yin Lai Bin Lai) as the ending song for his movie Gen-Y Cops.

== Track listing ==
1. "Heroes" (English version of "要来便来")
2. 欠了你的愛" (Mandarin Version of "極愛自己")
3. "左上右落" Right Off The Left
4. "甜品" Desert
5. "要來便來" To Come Will Come (Gen Y Cops Original Soundtrack)
6. "你" You
7. "極愛自己" Loving Myself
