= She was Seventeen =

2015 Hong Kong play

She was Seventeen (Chinese: 那年我的孩子十七歲) is a 2015 Hong Kong play produced by Stage 64 to commemorate the 26th anniversary of the June Fourth Incident. The play was written by Lucretia Ho and directed by Lee King-cheong. It connects the 2014 Umbrella Movement with the 1989 Tiananmen Square protests, encouraging audiences to reflect on the course and evolution of democratic movements under the same regime.

== Background ==
Stage 64 was founded in 2009 by a group of volunteers from the Hong Kong Alliance in Support of Patriotic Democratic Movements of China. The troupe aims to commemorate and educate the public about the June Fourth Incident through theatre. Their debut work, Edelweiss, focusing on the tragedy and struggles of the protesters, attracted wide attention. Their second production, Beliefs Soar explored the Operation Yellowbird. Their third production centered on Wang Dan, a student leader of 1989 Tiananmen Square protests. She was Seventeen was their fourth production.

== Synopsis ==
That year, the grandaunt's seventeen-year-old daughter insisted on going to Tiananmen Square to serve as a first-aid volunteer and to support the 1989 Tiananmen Square protests. On June 4, she was shot dead by the People's Liberation Army. At first, friends, colleagues, and the parents of other slain students were willing to support and comfort her. However, after the government declared that the crackdown was "justified" and branded the students as "counter-revolutionaries," those around her gradually distanced themselves. She was isolated, her social world torn apart at the roots. Unable to endure, she chose to stop telling others the truth about her daughter's death on June 4th and claimed that she had died of illness. In doing so, her "friends" and "colleagues" returned. For the next twenty-five years, she lived in a world stripped of her daughter's memory.

Twenty-five years later, the mother travels from Beijing to Hong Kong to visit relatives. There, she meets Wai-jai, a seventeen-year-old Form Six student who supports Occupy Central and the Umbrella Movement. Terrified that Wai-jai might meet the same fate as her daughter, she tries desperately to keep him away from the movement. Through Wai-jai, she is introduced to the Tiananmen Mothers, and she begins to confront once again the truth of the government's blood-soaked crackdown.
