= Wang Dan (play) =

2014 Hong Kong play

Wang Dan (Chinese: 王丹) was a 2014 play produced by Stage 64. The play centers on Wang Dan, one of the student leaders of the June Fourth Incident. It was directed by Lee King-cheong and staged at the Shouson Theatre of the Hong Kong Arts Centre from 20 to 22 June 2014, with a total of five performances.

== Background ==
Stage 64 was founded in 2009 by a group of volunteers from the Hong Kong Alliance in Support of Patriotic Democratic Movements of China. The troupe aims to commemorate and educate the public about the June Fourth Incident through theatre. Their debut work, Edelweiss, focusing on the tragedy and struggles of the protesters, attracted wide attention. Their second production, Beliefs Soar explored the Operation Yellowbird, the challenges of democratic ideals, collective negotiation, and historical trauma. Wang Dan is their third production.

== Plot ==
Wang Dan is not a conventional biographical play, but a symbolic exploration of the protagonist's inner world. Five actors with two women appear on stage simultaneously, each representing a different phase of Wang Dan's life:

- Child Wang Dan (female role) — symbolizing innocence and the awakening of ideals
- Young Wang Dan — representing the activist and decision-maker during the 1989 movement
- Imprisoned Wang Dan — embodying reflection and struggle during years of incarceration
- Middle-aged Wang Dan — exile and longing for home
- Ideal Wang Dan (female role) — appearing through poetic recitation, symbolizing inner romance and gentleness

All five versions of Wang Dan appear on stage together, engaging in dialogue with one another — representing the interplay between ideal and reality, past and present. The stage design incorporates imagery such as carousels and playgrounds, symbolizing the cycles of idealism, loss, and persistence.

== Production ==
While preparing, the creative team visited Wang Dan in Taipei to conduct interviews and gather materials, using his writings and conversations as the creative foundation.

Producer Cheung Ka-wan explained that Wang Dan was chosen as the protagonist not only for his symbolic role as a student leader, but also because his personal reflections embody those of a generation. Wang once described himself as "a hopeless idealist," and the team used this as a basis to explore the tension between idealism and reality. In retrospect, Wang Dan has admitted that if he could relive the events of 1989, he would have urged students to withdraw to avoid bloodshed, revealing a mature reflection and compromise between ideals and reality. The play also hopes to explore the emotional struggles of exiled activists who have been unable to return home for many years.

A playground serves as the central metaphor in the production, symbolizing the innocence and idealism of youth, which gradually collapse and decay over time. This imagery reflects Wang Dan's enduring commitment to his beliefs even after disillusionment. The creative team deliberately avoided providing a definitive conclusion. Instead, they sought to prompt audiences to reflect on "the ideal playground within everyone's heart" and whether it is worth preserving and pursuing.

In the play, five actors portray different stages of Wang Dan's life. The director intentionally did not require them to resemble Wang in appearance, in order to convey the idea that "everyone can be Wang Dan."

== Reception ==
Critic of the International Association of Theatre Critics observed that the use of five actors of different genders and ages to portray Wang Dan effectively symbolized the notion that "everyone can be Wang Dan." While the artistic approach was bold and innovative, he found the execution at times redundant and overlapping. He also argued that the metaphor of the playground and carousel as symbols of Wang Dan's ideals appeared forced and inconsistent with his childhood experiences during the late Cultural Revolution, making it feel abrupt.
