= Stage 64 =

Theatre company

Stage 64 (Chinese: 六四舞台) is a Hong Kong theatre company established in 2009 to commemorate the 1989 Tiananmen Square protests and massacre. The organization was founded by a group of volunteers from the Hong Kong Alliance in Support of Patriotic Democratic Movements of China (HKASPDMC). Its aim was to use drama to recreate the historical memory of the incident, to convey messages of democracy and human rights, and to encourage reflection on history.

Since 2009, Stage 64 had presented plays related to this theme around the anniversary of June 4th each year, performing in community theatres and secondary schools. In 2021, under the National Security Law, as key members of the HKASPDMC were successively arrested, Stage 64 officially disbanded. In 2024, on the 35th anniversary of June 4th, Stage 64 was re-formed in the United Kingdom.

== History ==
=== Founding ===
Stage 64 was founded by Wei Siu-lik, Lit Ming-wai, and Cheung Ka-wan, who were respectively a graphic designer, a physiotherapist, and a social worker. After participating in the 2003 July 1 march, they became long-term HKASPDMC volunteers. In 2008, after organizing the 19th June 4th Vigil at Victoria Park, they began considering ways to continue commemorative activities through art. They invited playwright Mandu (James Cheung), director Lee King-cheong, and Tiananmen eyewitness journalist Choi Shuk-fong to collaboratively create the play Edelweiss. In 2009, it was performed on the 20th anniversary of the June 4th Incident, which ultimately led to the establishment of Stage 64.

=== Hong Kong period ===
In March 2010, during rehearsals for a restaging of Edelweiss, a backstage staff member received a threatening phone call warning that continued involvement could harm their artistic career. Subsequently, all five backstage staff resigned, along with two actors. The news caused public uproar, and members of the theatre community quickly stepped in to fill the gaps. All 1,500 tickets for the five performances sold out within a day.

From 2011, Stage 64 launched a secondary school touring program, with nearly 30 schools participating in its first year. In the following years, the program maintained around 40 performances annually, but by 2016, both the number of performances and ticket sales had dropped significantly, with only 28 schools willing to host the troupe. Members noted that some schools may have faced political pressure, while younger audiences were becoming increasingly detached from the June 4th topic.

In 2020, due to the COVID-19 pandemic, scheduled performances were canceled. The troupe launched an online fundraising campaign to support production costs and shifted to livestream performances. On the eve of June 4th, the play May 35th (Gengzi version (Note: a year in the sexagenary cycle, which means "2020 version")) was streamed globally for free, attracting over 60,000 viewers and garnering more than 550,000 views within 90 hours. In the same year, the Hong Kong police banned HKASPDMC from holding its annual June 4th Vigil at Victoria Park. On June 30, the Hong Kong SAR government announced the official enactment of the National Security Law.

Affected by the pandemic, the troupe's scheduled performances in January 2021 were canceled again. Instead, two online live reading sessions were held on June 1 and 3, featuring May 35th (Gengzi Version) and Edelweiss.

In September 2021, members of HKASPDMC were arrested. Police formally charged chairman Lee Cheuk-yan, vice-chairman Ho Chun-yan, and Chow Hang-tung, along with other members, with "incitement of subversion." As a result, Stage 64 disbanded voluntarily.

=== After disbanding in Hong Kong ===
In 2022 and 2023, Stage 64 authorized theatre troupes in Japan and Taiwan to perform May 35th in Japanese and Mandarin, respectively. From April 20 to 24, 2022, the Japanese version, translated by playwright Ishihara Nen, was staged seven times at the Tokyo Metropolitan Theatre. It was produced by the Japanese theatre company P-Company, directed by Matsumoto Yuko, and received the Odashima Yushi Award for Drama Translation. From 2 to 4 June 2023, the Mandarin version of May 35th was performed five times in Taipei, organized by Amnesty International Taiwan and produced by Shinehouse Theatre, with a special additional reading in Cantonese.

In 2024, on the 35th anniversary of June 4th, Stage 64 was re-formed in the United Kingdom. The troupe produced an English version of May 35th, marking its world premiere in London.

== Performances ==
^ Only performed in school tours, the rest were all performed publicly

- Edelweiss (Note: Chinese《在廣場上放一朵小白花》lit. 'Place a Little White Flower in the (Tiananmen) Square ') (2009)
- Beliefs Soar (Note: Chinese《讓黃雀飛》lit. 'Let the Yellow Bird Fly ') (2012)
- Beliefs Soar (Rerun) (Note: Chinese《黃雀飛——佔領中環版》lit. 'Let the Yellow Bird Fly (Occupy Central version) ') (2013)
- Wang Dan (Note: Chinese《王丹》) (2014)
- She was Seventeen (Note: Chinese《那年我的孩子十七歲》lit. 'That year my child was seventeen ')^ (2015)
- Blooms of Darkness (Note: Chinese《推土機前種花》lit. 'Planting Flowers Before the Bulldozers ') (2016)
- A Glimpse of Hope (Note: Chinese《傷城記》lit. 'Tales of a Wounded City ' with a pun on 傷(injury) and 雙(doubled or paired)) (2017)
- Freedom of the Press (Note: Chinese《沒有8903》lit. 'Without 8903 ' 89 refers to 1989, the year June Fourth Incident occurred; and 03 refers 2003, the year of SARS pandemic)^ (2017)
- Xiaobo and Liuxia (Note: Chinese《大海落霞》lit. 'The Sea and the Setting Glow ' The title refers to the Chinese given names of Liu Xiaobo and Liu Xia poetically.)^ (2019)
- May 35th (Note: Chinese《5月35日》) (2019)

== Operation ==
Stage 64 was a non-profit volunteer organization, with all members participating without pay. Its funding mainly came from fundraising efforts, the Hong Kong Alliance in Support of Patriotic Democratic Movements of China, and partial support from the Hong Kong Professional Teachers' Union, which was used to cover expenses for directors, actors, and venues.

== Three decades of commemorating June 4th ==
During the height of the pro-democracy movement from May to June 1989, more than one million people in Hong Kong took to the streets in protest. From Xinhua News Agency and labor unions of Chinese-funded enterprises to pro-democracy groups, community organizations, and people from all walks of life — regardless of political stance — they all voiced their support for Beijing's democracy movement. This wave of support for democracy is unprecedented in Hong Kong's history. There were no political stand of left or right, only right or wrong. Even actors of TVB Jade's show Enjoy Yourself Tonight would wear black armband before going on stage. For the next thirty years, Hong Kong is the only place in China's soil where large-scale commemoration can be held.

Compared with thirty years ago, when Hong Kong society could still freely discuss June 4th, the space for expression and creativity has gradually narrowed since 2019, and commemorative events have faced increasing restrictions. In 2019, the 30th anniversary of June 4th marked the last candlelight vigil held at Victoria Park. Following the enactment of the National Security Law, one civil group dissolved after another.

Directors Lee King-cheong, Angus Chan Man-bun, and actress Tam Tsz-ling among others, said that the theater troupe's persistence is not only about preserving historical memory, but also reflects the real circumstances Hong Kong people face under the same regime. They believe that reflecting on June 4th is not only about China's history but also about Hong Kong's own story. The thirty years of June 4th vigils symbolize thirty years of freedom in Hong Kong.
