= Global Media and Communication =

- Discipline: Communication studies
- Language: English
- Edited by: Daya K. Thussu, John Downing, Des Freedman, Clemencia Rodríguez, Yuezhi Zhao

Publication details
- History: 2005-present
- Publisher: SAGE Publications
- Frequency: Triannually
- Impact factor: (2010)

Standard abbreviations
- ISO 4: Glob. Media Commun.

Indexing
- ISSN: 1742-7665
- OCLC no.: 290679596

Links
- Online access; Online archive

Global Media and Communication is a triannual peer-reviewed academic journal that covers the field of communication studies. The editors-in-chief are Daya K. Thussu (University of Westminster), John Downing (Southern Illinois University), Des Freedman (Goldsmiths), Clemencia Rodríguez (University of Oklahoma), and Yuezhi Zhao. It was established in 2005 and is currently published by SAGE Publications.

== Abstracting and indexing ==
Global Media and Communication is abstracted and indexed in the following databases:

- Academic Premier
- Communication Abstracts
- Educational Research Abstracts Online
- International Bibliography of the Social Sciences
- Linguistics and Language Behavior Abstracts
- Scopus
