= Conservatism in China =

Conservatism in China (simplified Chinese: 保守主义; traditional Chinese: 保守主義; pinyin: bǎoshǒu zhǔyì) emphasizes authority and meritocracy stemming from Confucian values, and economically, aims for state capitalism rather than free markets. Many Chinese conservatives reject original sin, empiricism, individualism, parochialism or classical liberal principles and differ from modern Western conservatism because Chinese conservatism believes in the innate goodness of man, and has a strong rationalist, communitarian and universalist element. A major concern of modern Chinese conservatism is the preservation of traditional Chinese culture.

== History ==
=== Imperial China ===
Chinese conservatism can be traced back to Confucius, whose philosophy is based on the values of loyalty, duty, and respect. He believed in a hierarchically organized society, modeled after the patriarchal family and headed by an absolute sovereign. However, Confucius also believed that the state should employ a meritocratic class of administrators and advisers, recruited by civil service exams. An alternative school of thought called Legalism argued that administrative discipline, not Confucian virtue, was crucial for the governance of the state.

For thousands of years, China was ruled by monarchs of various imperial dynasties. The Mandate of Heaven theory was invoked to legitimize the absolute authority of the Emperor. In the nineteenth century, imperial rule was challenged from within and without. The Taiping Rebellion (1849–1861) was a massive popular movement that aimed at both social and political revolution, but the Tongzhi Restoration (1861–1872) rejuvenated the regime with a combination of military innovation and social order. The historian Mary C. Wright calls this "the last stand of Chinese conservatism," although later historians have different views.

From 1899 to 1901, the Boxers were a secret society, a Chinese conservative movement against Western imperialist aggression and Christian missionary work and in support of Qing dynasty. They used the slogan "Uphold the Qing, destroy foreigners!"

=== Republic of China ===
The Xinhai Revolution of 1911 overthrew Puyi, the last Chinese Emperor, and ushered in the Republic of China. The Chinese nationalist party Kuomintang (KMT) was originally a social democratic party that advocated Westernization during the Sun Yat-sen period. Chiang Kai-shek, who succeeded Sun as leader of the KMT, was originally classified as "centrist", with the more Buddhist traditional and conservative "rightist" Western Hills Group and the "leftist" Reorganization Group led by Wang Jingwei. KMT was a Chinese nationalist party that ruled mainland China from 1927 to 1949, and after the anti-communist Shanghai massacre in 1927, Chiang was reinforced in right-wing and conservative elements (such as traditional values).

Chiang's Nationalist revolution became "conservative" in rejecting the communist attack on social hierarchies and inequalities, but remained revolutionary in the party-state's attack on the "materialist" order and mobilization of the masses to avoid a Western style capitalist modernity. The New Life Movement was a government-led civic campaign in the 1930s to promote cultural reform and Neo-Confucian social morality. The goal was to unite China under a centralised ideology following the emergence of ideological challenges to the status quo. This movement was related to Chiang Kai-shek's anti-Communist campaign at the time, but today it also inspires conservatives like General Secretary Xi Jinping of the Chinese Communist Party (CCP).

Following his defeat in the Chinese Civil War by the Chinese Communist Party (CCP), Chiang continued right-wing authoritarian ruling the island of Taiwan until his death in 1975.

=== Mao era ===
On the mainland, Chinese conservatism was vehemently opposed and suppressed by the CCP, especially during the Cultural Revolution. Members of the "Five Black Categories"—landlords, rich farmers, counter-revolutionaries, bad influencers, and right-wingers—were violently persecuted. Young people formed cadres of Red Guards throughout the country and sought to destroy the Four Olds: old ideas, old culture, old customs, and old habits—leading to the destruction of a large part of China's cultural heritage, including historical artifacts and religious sites. Among them, some Red Guards who embraced local officials were pejoratively called "conservatives."

=== After the reform and opening up ===
Following the Mao era, cultural conservatism developed as a loose grouping of intellectual trends focused on indigenous sources of modernization. In recent decades, Chinese conservatism has experienced a national revival.

The influence of neoconservatism in political and intellectual circles increased following 1989. This trend of neoconservatism advocated a state-centered "realistic response" to what they perceived as a failure of the Mao-era socialist approach and the advancement of Western hegemony. Adherents of this view contend that liberal democracy is a nihilistic and Eurocentric model incompatible with Chinese cultural and political tradition.

Conservatives have called for a new religious consciousness and opposed the secular order envisioned by proponents of the New Enlightenment. Confucianism has increased its presence in mainstream Chinese thought. In addition to a New Confucianism, some conservatives embrace the Sino-Christian theology movement.

CCP General Secretary Xi Jinping has called traditional Chinese culture the soul of the nation and the foundation of the CCP.

Since Xi took office as CCP general secretary and became the top leader in November 2012, social conservatism has been strengthened, including the traditional gender role for women. After 2020, the Chinese Communist Party has accelerated its crackdown on LGBTQ+ activism. Several journalists and scholars have described new Confucianism and nationalist conservatism as the key features of China under Xi Jinping's leadership. In 2026, the Cyberspace Administration of China launched a campaign directing Chinese social media platforms to censor content that "promotes not marrying and not having children" or that "provokes gender antagonism", a move that has been criticized for its traditionalist and anti-feminist intent.

== Types ==
As a term, conservatism has been used to characterize multiple intellectual trends, including Confucian revivalists, cultural nationalists, and proponents of realpolitik. A common theme among the diverse trends of conservatism in China is the continuity of the Chinese civilizational tradition and opposition to Western secular modernity.

=== Chiangism ===
Chiangism (Chinese: 蔣介石主義) is the political philosophy of President Generalissimo Chiang Kai-shek, who used it during his rule in China under the Kuomintang on both the mainland and Taiwan. It is a right-wing (Note: During the 1920s and early 1930s, Chiang and supporters was seen as a 'centrist' among 'right-wing' Hu Hanmin supporters and 'left-wing' Wang Jingwei supporters, but the Chinese Communist Party (or Maoism) later emerged as the main rival of the KMT, making Chiangism a 'right-wing' ideology.) authoritarian nationalist ideology based on the Three Principles of the People mixed with Confucianism. It was primarily practiced as part of the New Life Movement, as well as the Chinese Cultural Renaissance movement. It was influenced by other political ideologies, including socialism, fascism, party-state capitalism and paternalistic conservatism, as well as by Chiang's Methodist Christian beliefs.

=== Cultural conservatism ===
During the May Fourth Movement, Xueheng School was the main school of thought advocating cultural conservatism. In contemporary China, cultural conservatism mainly has greater influence among the emerging middle class, and it overlaps with various other ideological trends such as liberalism, neoauthoritarianism, the New Left, and neo-nationalism.

Central to the ideas of the Cultural Revolution was the elimination of the Four Olds, which were elements of Chinese culture that at the time were seen to oppose the goals of Communism in China. However, the Chinese Communist Party (CCP) at the time protected some of the most important Chinese historical monuments, including some archaeological discoveries such as the Terracotta Army.

After the Reform and Opening Up, the Chinese Communist Party have shifted its stance and adapted cultural conservatism. The chief ideologue and the gray eminence of the Chinese Communist Party, Wang Huning, has criticized the western youth for their supposed rejection of traditional western values in his writing; Wang argues for a culturally unified and traditionalist China, albeit mixed with Marxist-Leninist theories. CCP general secretary Xi Jinping has overseen a revival in the popularity of historical Chinese cultural figures such as Confucius. He has placed more emphasis on the value of Chinese culture than his predecessors and has included it among his "comprehensive" political goals. Furthermore, Xi Jinping has also accelerated the crackdown on LGBTQ+ activism and pornography production. Preservation of traditional culture is a major concern of modern Chinese conservatism.

=== Dai Jitao Thought ===
Dai Jitao Thought (Chinese: 戴季陶主義) is an ideology based on the interpretation of the Three Principles of the People by some Kuomintang members, including Dai Jitao, since Sun Yat-sen's death in March 1925. Dai Jitao Thought became the ideological foundation of the right wing Kuomintang, including the Western Hills Group. Dai Jitao himself described it as the "Pure Three Principles of the People" (纯粹三民主义).

=== Left-conservatism ===
In China, orthodox Marxist–Leninist ideological bureaucrats who were skeptical of the Chinese economic reforms were simultaneously regarded as both left-wing and conservative. The left-conservative faction of the post-reform and opening up Chinese Communist Party (CCP) is represented by the supporters of Chen Yun, Deng Liqun, and Xi Jinping Thought within the party. Since Xi Jinping became the CCP General Secretary in 2012, the CCP has pushed for socially conservative and nationalist reforms, including crackdown on LGBTQ+ activism and feminism, and encouragement for traditional family values. At the same time, economic reforms that aim to address rising inequalities and corruptions was also implemented by the CCP under Xi Jinping. Jiang Shigong, a Schmittian thinker, is a "conservative socialist" exponent of Xi Jinping Thought and is opposed to liberalism in China.

=== Neoauthoritarianism ===
Neoauthoritarianism (Chinese: 新权威主义; pinyin: xīn quánwēi zhǔyì) is a current of "reformist" political thought within the People's Republic of China (PRC), and to some extent the Chinese Communist Party (CCP), that advocates a strong, centralized state to facilitate market reforms as necessary for democratic political reform, emphasizing stability. Though incorporating aspects of Marxist–Leninist and Maoist theories in its origination, it was described as right-wing by Yuezhi Zhao, and earlier as classically conservative by Barry Sautman, with formal debate not involving Marxism.

Its origin was based in reworked ideas of Samuel Huntington. Taking market liberalization and democratization as destabilizing, Huntington advised the post-Communist East European elite to take a gradualist approach to them in favor of stability, decoupling and rejecting earlier optimistic development theories that they would easily follow with modernization; hence, "new authoritarianism." The concept of liberal democracy led to intense debate between democratic advocates and neoauthoritarians prior to the 1989 Tiananmen Square protests and massacre, with the Neoauthoritarian wing close to Zhao Ziyang.

The Tianamen Square protests led to the debate being stalled. Though Deng Xiaoping reputedly professed to be open to Neo-authoritarian ideas, the current was further moderated by his commitment to keeping state control over the commanding heights of the economy. Chris Bamall considered Chinese policy following Deng's death (1997) consistent with Neoauthoritarianism under Jiang Zemin and the early leadership of Hu Jintao up to the late 2000s, including decoupling the Renminbi currency from the dollar, liberalizing prices, and passing a law allowing an increase in inheritance in 2008.

==== Figures ====
Neoauthoritarian school was influenced by Brazil led by João Figueiredo, Singapore led by Lee Kuan Yew and Goh Chok Tong, South Korea led by Park Chung-hee, Chun Doo-hwan and Roh Tae-woo, the Soviet Union led by Mikhail Gorbachev, Taiwan led by Chiang Kai-shek, Chiang Ching-kuo and Lee Teng-hui, and Turkey led by Turgut Özal.

The political tendency includes a range of views on how its goals should be pursued. Neoauthoritarianism is divided into the northern and southern schools. The northern school of neoauthoritarianism advocated using government power to implement radical reforms, with its main representatives being Wu Jiaxiang, Chen Yizi, Zhang Bingjiu, and Yang Baikui. The southern school of neoauthoritarianism emphasized traditional culture and political stability, advocating for the use of government power to implement gradual reforms and to cultivate an independent middle class as a balancing mechanism during the process of democratic transition; its main representatives were Xiao Gongqin and Wang Huning. But Wang Huning has rejected the word "neoauthoritarianism", and defined himself as a Marxist–Leninist. Later on, Wang Huning has turned into a CCP senior official, widely regarded as the grey eminence and chief ideologue of the CCP, has criticized aspects of Marxism and recommended that China combine its historical and modern values.

==== Background ====
Following the 1978 Third Plenum, which made Deng Xiaoping paramount leader, China employed a variety of strategies to develop its economy, beginning the reform and opening up. By 1982 the success of China's market experiments had become apparent, making more radical strategies seem possible and desirable. This led to the lifting of price controls and agricultural decollectivization, signaling the abandonment of the New Economic Policy, or economic Leninism, in favour of market socialism.

With economic developments and political changes, China departed from totalitarianism towards what Harry Harding characterized as a "consultative authoritarian regime." One desire of political reform was to "restore normalcy and unity to elite politics so as to bring to an end the chronic instability of the late Maoist period and create a more orderly process of leadership succession." With cadre reform, individual leaders in China, recruited for their performance and education, became more economically liberal, with less ideological loyalty.

==== Emergence and rise ====
Neo-authoritarianism began developing as a school of thought in China in the mid-1980s as a response to social and economic problems caused by market reforms. The earliest discourse on neo-authoritarianism in Shanghai, where young intellectuals were theorizing the relationship between competent political leadership, the role of centralized power in national modernization, and the situation of the newly-industrializing East Asian countries. These early discussions drew from Western political thought to propose non-Marxist-Leninist and non-democratic approaches to transforming China's economic and political systems.

Samuel Huntington's influential book Political Order in Changing Societies was translated into Chinese in 1988 and informed Chinese academic debate about democracy. Its central premise was that economic development could bring political disorder. Huntington contended that communist states should not democratize quickly but rather do so gradually, an approach he described as neo-authoritarian because it required reform-minded elites to oversee the process. Chinese neo-authoritarians drawing on these ideas thus do not necessarily view neo-authoritarianism as the ideal mode of governance but rather a necessary step at a given stage of development.

Democratic and Neoauthoritarian political discussions emerged in academic circles centered on Beijing in 1988. Neoauthoritarianism caught the attention of the Chinese Communist Party (CCP) in early 1988 when Wu Jiaxiang wrote an article in which he concluded that the British monarchy initiated modernization by "pulling down 100 castles overnight", developmentally linking autocracy and freedom as preceding democracy and freedom.

Discourse about the growth of the Four Asian Tigers and the benefits of Asian values contributed to the growth of neo-authoritarianism.

==== Persistence as neoconservatism ====
Growth in per capita GDP in the tiger economies between 1960 and 2014

Neo-authoritarianism lost favor after the suppression of the 1989 student movement, including because it was viewed as ideologically discredited through its ties to Zhao Ziyang.

Most associated with Shanghai intellectuals, Wang Huning, a leading advocate in the 1980s, became a close advisor to CCP general secretary Jiang Zemin in the 1990s. The neo-conservatives would enjoy Jiang's patronage.

Differing views exist on the extent to which neo-authoritarianism continued or re-emerged as the idea of neo-conservativism. According to academic He Li, "Neo-authoritarianism, associated with reformers in the party, disappeared after 1989. Neoconservativism, arising in its place, absorbed several groupings of different shades."

New Conservatism or neoconservatism (Chinese: 新保守主义; pinyin: xīn bǎoshǒu zhǔyì) (or, rarely, New Conservativism) fused liberal, conservative and social evolutionist ideas, and argued for political and economic centralization and the establishment of shared moral values to achieve civil society and a middle class which could serve as the basis for a pluralist democratic social order. It's influenced by Mustafa Kemal Atatürk, Karl Popper and liberal conservatives such as Edmund Burke, Friedrich Hayek, Michael Oakeshott, Alexis de Tocqueville and Yan Fu. The movement has been described in the West by political scientist Joseph Fewsmith. Neoconservatives are opposed to radical reform projects and argue that an authoritarian and incrementalist approach is necessary to stabilize the process of modernization. European and American political scientists have located neoconservatism in the middle of left-conservatism and liberalism.

Prominent neoconservative theorists include Xiao Gongqin, initially a leading neoauthoritarian who promoted "gradual reform under strong rule" after 1989.

==== Theory ====
A central figure, if not principal proponent of Neoauthoritarianism, the "well-connected" Wu Jiaxiang was an advisor to Premier Zhao Ziyang, the latter being a major architect of the Deng Xiaoping reforms.

Samuel Huntington's 1968 Political Order in Changing Societies rejected economic development or modernization as transferable to the political sphere as a mere variable of the former. He preconditioned democracy on institutionalization and stability, with democracy and economic change straining if not undermining political stability in poor circumstances. He considered the measure of a political system to be its ability to keep order. In this regard, he lauded the United States and Soviet Union equally; what the Soviet Union lacked in social justice, it made up for in strong controls.

Wu considered social developments like liberal democracy unable to proceed simply from new authorities. Democracy has to be based on the development of the market, because the market reduces the number of public decisions, the number of people seeking political power and rights for economic benefit, and therefore the "cost" of political action. The separation of the political and economic spheres lays a foundation for a further separation of powers, thereby negating autocracy despite the centralizing tendency of the state. The market also defines interests, increasing "responsibility" and thereby decreasing the possibility of bribery in preparation for democratic politics. On the other hand, political actions become excessive without a market, or with a mixed market, because a large number of people will seek political posts, raising the "cost" of political action and making effective consultation difficult. To avoid this problem, a country without a developed market has to maintain strongman politics and a high degree of centralism.

Neoconservatism in China is characterized by state-centered nationalism and opposition to cultural cosmpolitanism. It opposes political approaches that it characterizes as "radical" changes, citing for example the 1989 student movement as an example of romantic radicalism.

==== Legacy ====
China's measures for successful economic and political stabilization led many scholars and politicians to accept the role of an authoritarian regime in fast and stable economic growth. Although the Chinese state is seen as legitimizing democracy as a modernization goal, economic growth is seen as more important.

In his 1994 article Zheng Yongnian elaborates that,

Administrative power should be strengthened to provide favorable conditions, especially stable politics, for market development. Without such a political instrument, both 'reform' and 'open door' are impossible... A precondition of political development is the provision of very favorable conditions for economic progress. Political stability must be given highest priority... without stable politics, domestic construction is impossible, let alone an 'open door' policy. So, if political reform or democracy undermines political stability, it is not worthwhile. In other words, an authoritarian regime is desirable if it can produce stable politics.

Deng Xiaoping explains: "Why have we treated student demonstrations so seriously and so quickly? Because China is not able to bear more disturbance and more disorder." Given the dominance of the Chinese state, Zheng believes that, when democracy is finally implemented, it is more likely to be a gift from the elite to the society rather than brought about by internal forces.

==== Criticism and views ====
When neoauthoritarianism emerged to scholarly debate, Rong Jian opposed his old idea as regressive, favoring the multiparty faction. He would become famous for a news article on the matter.

Chinese-Canadian sociologist Yuezhi Zhao views the neoauthoritarians as having attempted to avoid an economic crisis through dictatorship, and Barry Sautman characterizes them as reflecting the policy of "pre-revolutionary Chinese leaders" as well as "contemporary Third World strongmen", as part of ideological developments of the decade he considers more recognizable to westerners as conservative and liberal. Sautman sums its theory with a quote from Su Shaozi (1986): "What China needs today is a strong liberal leader."

Li Cheng and Lynn T. White nonetheless regard the neoauthoritarians as resonating with technocracy emerging in the 1980s as a result of "dramatic" policy shifts in 1978 that promoted such to top posts. Henry He considers the main criticism of neoauthoritarianism to be its continued advocacy of an "old" type of establishment, relying on charismatic leaders. His view is corroborated by Yan Yining and Li Wei, with the addition that for Yan what is needed is law, or Li democracy, administrative efficiency and scientific government. Li points out that previous crisis in China were not due to popular participation, but power struggles and corruption, and that an authoritarian state does not usually separate powers. A criticism by Zhou Wenzhang is that neoauthoritarianism only considers problems of authority from the angle of centralization, similarly considering the main problem of authority to be whether or not it is exercised scientifically.

== Party-state capitalism ==
Party-state capitalism is a term used by some economists and sociologists to describe the contemporary economy of China under the Chinese Communist Party. The term has also been used to describe the economy of Taiwan under the authoritarian military government of the Kuomintang.

== By region ==
=== Hong Kong ===
Conservatism in Hong Kong has become the backbone of today's pro-Beijing camp, which has been the major supporting force of the SAR administration led by the indirectly elected Chief Executive. It is one of two major political ideologies of the Hong Kong, with the other being liberalism. Since the Sino-British Joint Declaration of 1984, conservatism has been characterised by business elites joining with pro-Communist traditional leftists in a "united front" to resist the rise of the demand for democratisation and liberalisation, to secure continued political stability and economic prosperity while maintaining a good relationship with the communist central government in Beijing leading up to and after the 1997 handover.

Historically, conservatism derives from the Chinese tradition of familism and Confucianism and was incorporated into the British colonial government's policies by Governor Cecil Clementi in the 1920s in the wake of rising Marxism–Leninism and communism in general. The anti-communist sentiments continued after the Second World War when waves of Chinese refugees fled to the colony as the Chinese Communist Party (CCP) swept across Mainland China in the renewed Chinese Civil War. At this time, Conservatives supported the Republic of China (ROC), and were pro–Kuomintang (KMT). After the de facto end of the Chinese Civil War in 1949 when the ROC government fled to Taiwan and throughout the Cold War, Conservatives have also taken libertarian thoughts on economic policies. Before the 1980s, most conservatives held a strong anti-communist sentiment.

=== Macau ===
Conservatism in Macau dates back to modern Portuguese Macau. Unlike Hong Kong, which was ruled by United Kingdom, a liberal democracy in the first half of the 20th century, Macao was influenced by Portugal's António de Oliveira Salazar's right-wing dictatorship in the 20th century, resulting in a weak liberal pro-democracy movement. Macau people, on average, have much more pro-China sentiment than Hong Kong people. Today, Macau's conservatism is represented by the pro-Beijing camp.

=== Taiwan (Republic of China, 1949–present) ===
Conservatism in Taiwan is a broad political philosophy which espouses the One-China policy as a vital component for the Republic of China (ROC)'s international security and economic development, as opposed to Taiwanization and Taiwanese sovereignty. Fundamental conservative ideas are grounded in Confucian values and strands of Chinese philosophy associated with Sun Yat-sen's teachings, a large centralized government which intervenes closely in the lives of individuals on both social and economic levels, and the construction of unified Sinocentric national identity.

Conservative ideology in Taiwan constitutes the character and policies of the Kuomintang (KMT) party and that of the pan-blue camp. However, not all conservatives in Taiwan are ideologically friendly to pan-blue, and there are also some conservatives, such as some conservative Taiwanese nationalists and pro-Beijing conservatives.

== Political parties ==
=== Mainland China ===
==== Current parties ====
- Chinese Communist Party (factions)
- Union of Chinese Nationalists (banned)

==== Historical parties ====
- Progressive Party
- Republican Party
- Royalist Party
- Unity Party

=== Macau ===
- Alliance for Change
- Macau-Guangdong Union
- Macau United Citizens Association
- New Macau Development Union

== Media ==
=== Mainland China ===
- Central Daily News (1928–2006; not mainland since 1949, pro-KMT)
- Economic Daily (1983–present, pro-Beijing)
- Global Times (1993–present, pro-Beijing)
- Shen Bao (1872–1949)

=== Hong Kong ===
- Headline Daily (2005–present, pro-Beijing)
- Hong Kong Economic Times (1988–present, pro-Beijing)
- Kung Sheung Daily News (1925–1984, pro-KMT)
- Oriental Daily News (1969–present, pro-Beijing)
- Sing Tao Daily (1938–present, pro-Beijing; historically pro-KMT)
- The Standard (1949–present, pro-Beijing)
- Wah Kiu Yat Po (1925–1995, pro-KMT)

=== Taiwan (Republic of China, 1949–present) ===
- Central Daily News (1928–2006, pro-KMT)
- Chung T'ien Television (1994–present, pro-KMT)
- China Television (1968–present, pro-KMT)
- China Times (1950–present, pro-KMT)
- Commercial Times (1978–present, pro-KMT)
- TVBS (1993–present, pro-KMT)
- United Daily News (1951–present, pro-KMT)

== New Confucianism ==
New Confucianism is an intellectual movement of Confucianism that began in the early 20th century in Republican China, and further developed in post-Mao era contemporary China. It primarily developed during the May Fourth Movement. It is deeply influenced by, but not identical with, the neo-Confucianism of the Song and Ming dynasties.

It is a neo-conservative movement of various Chinese traditions and has been regarded as containing religious overtones; it advocates for certain Confucianist elements of society – such as social, ecological, and political harmony – to be applied in a contemporary context in synthesis with Western philosophies such as rationalism and humanism. Its philosophies have emerged as a focal point of discussion between Confucian scholars in mainland China, Taiwan, Hong Kong, and the United States.

== Prominent figures ==
=== Mainland China ===
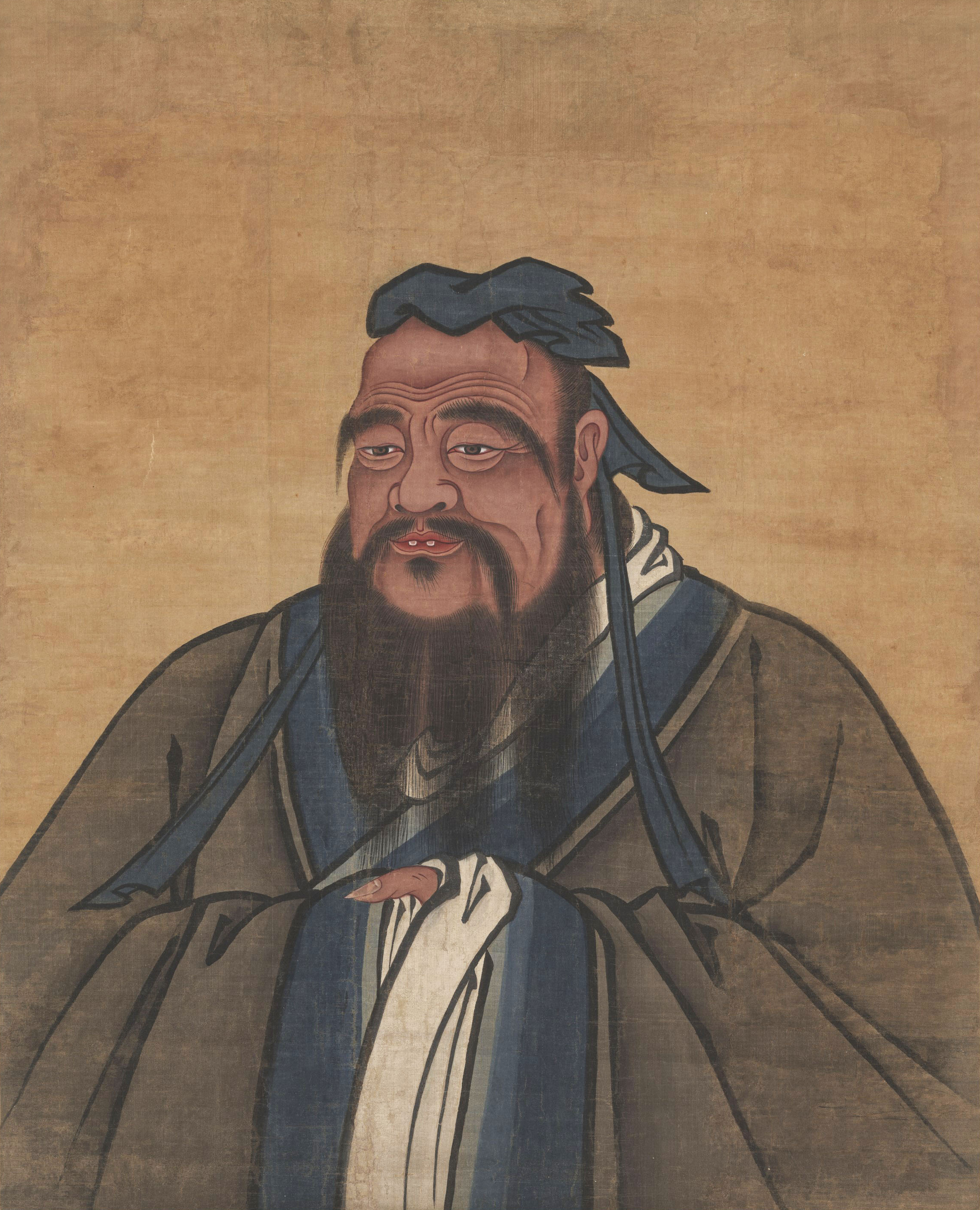
Confucius

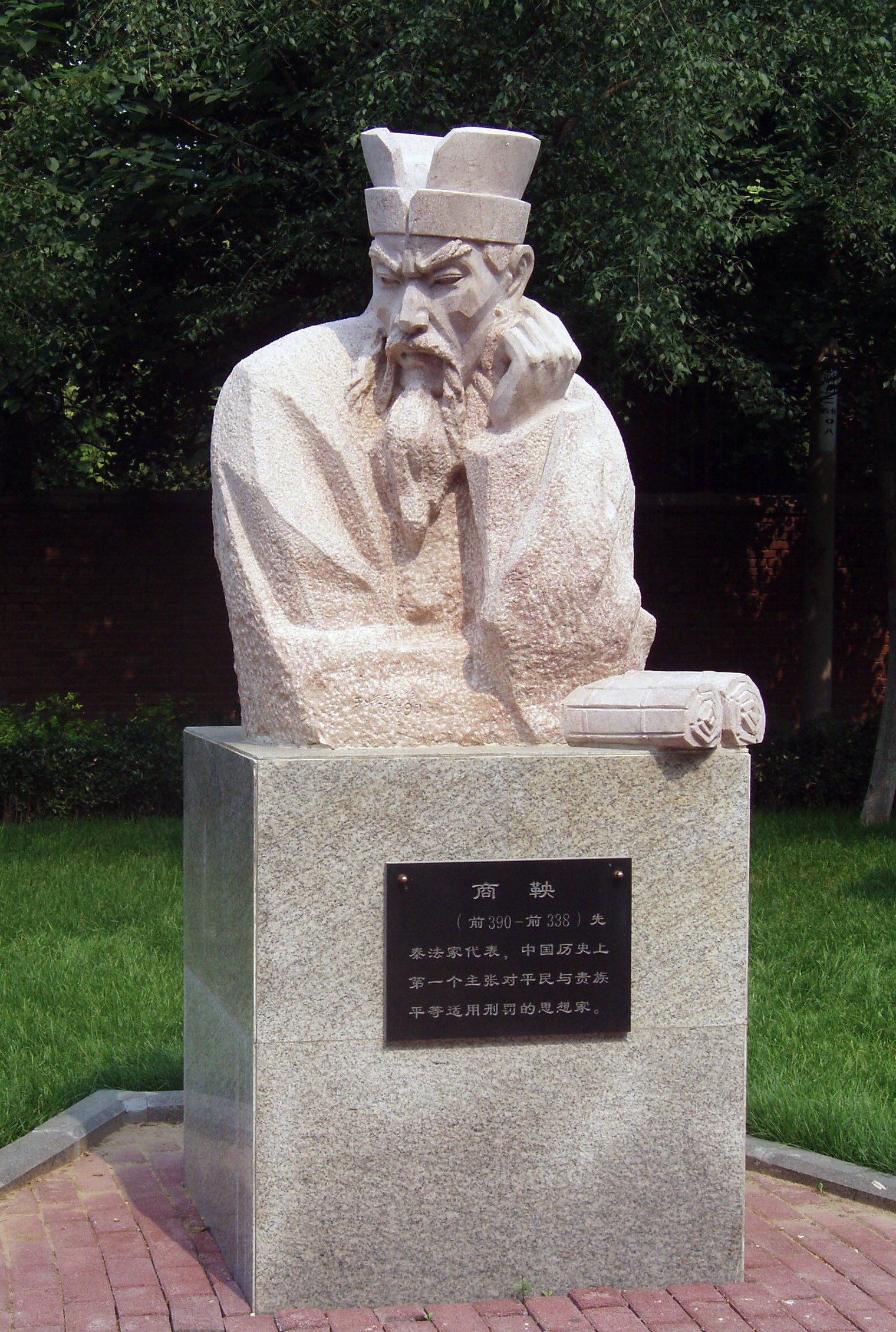
Shang Yang

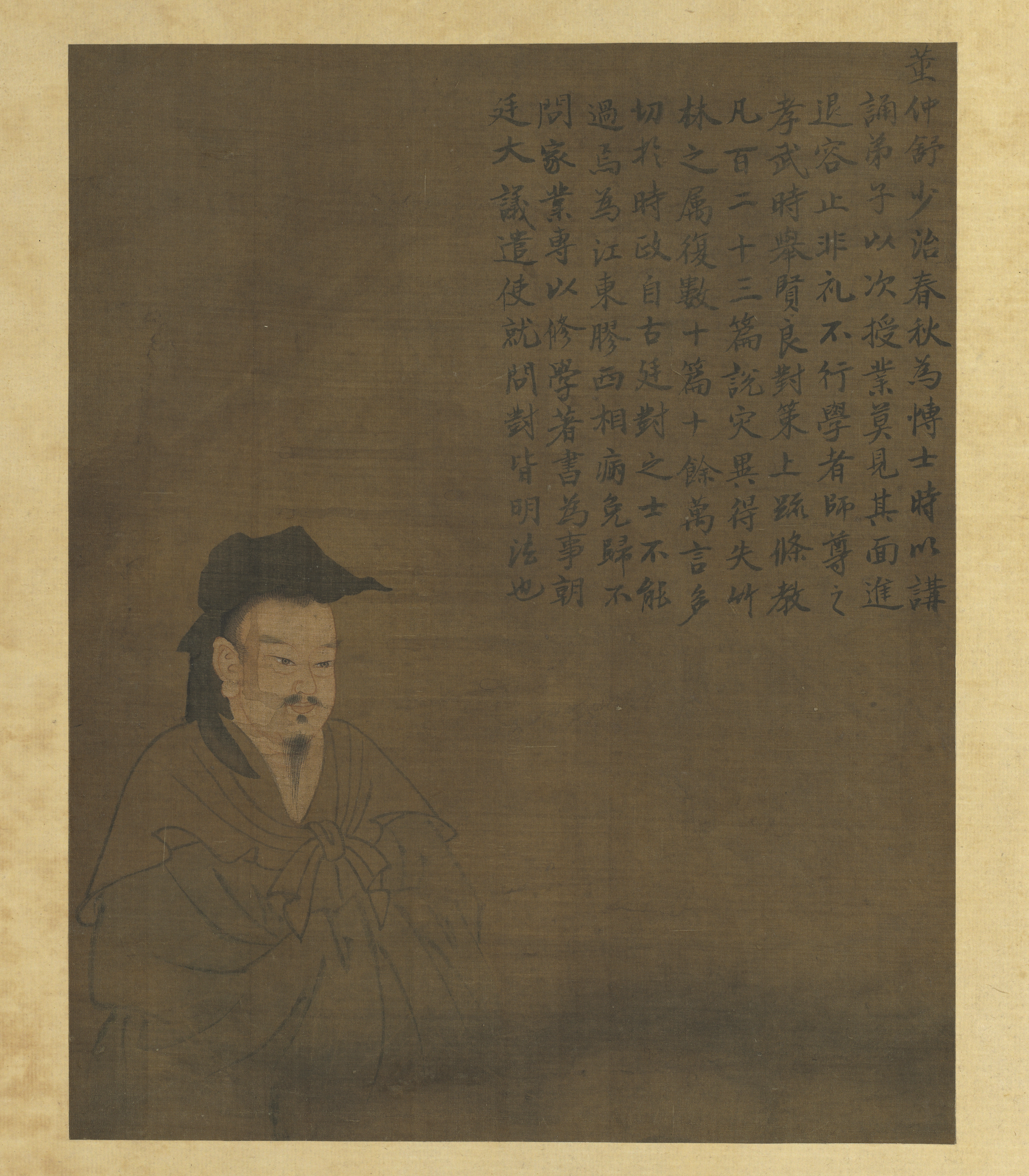
Dong Zhongshu

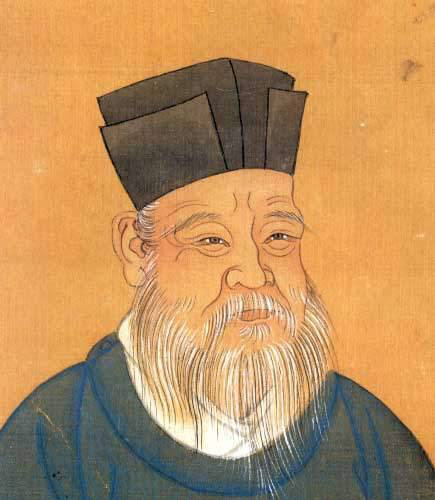
Zhu Xi

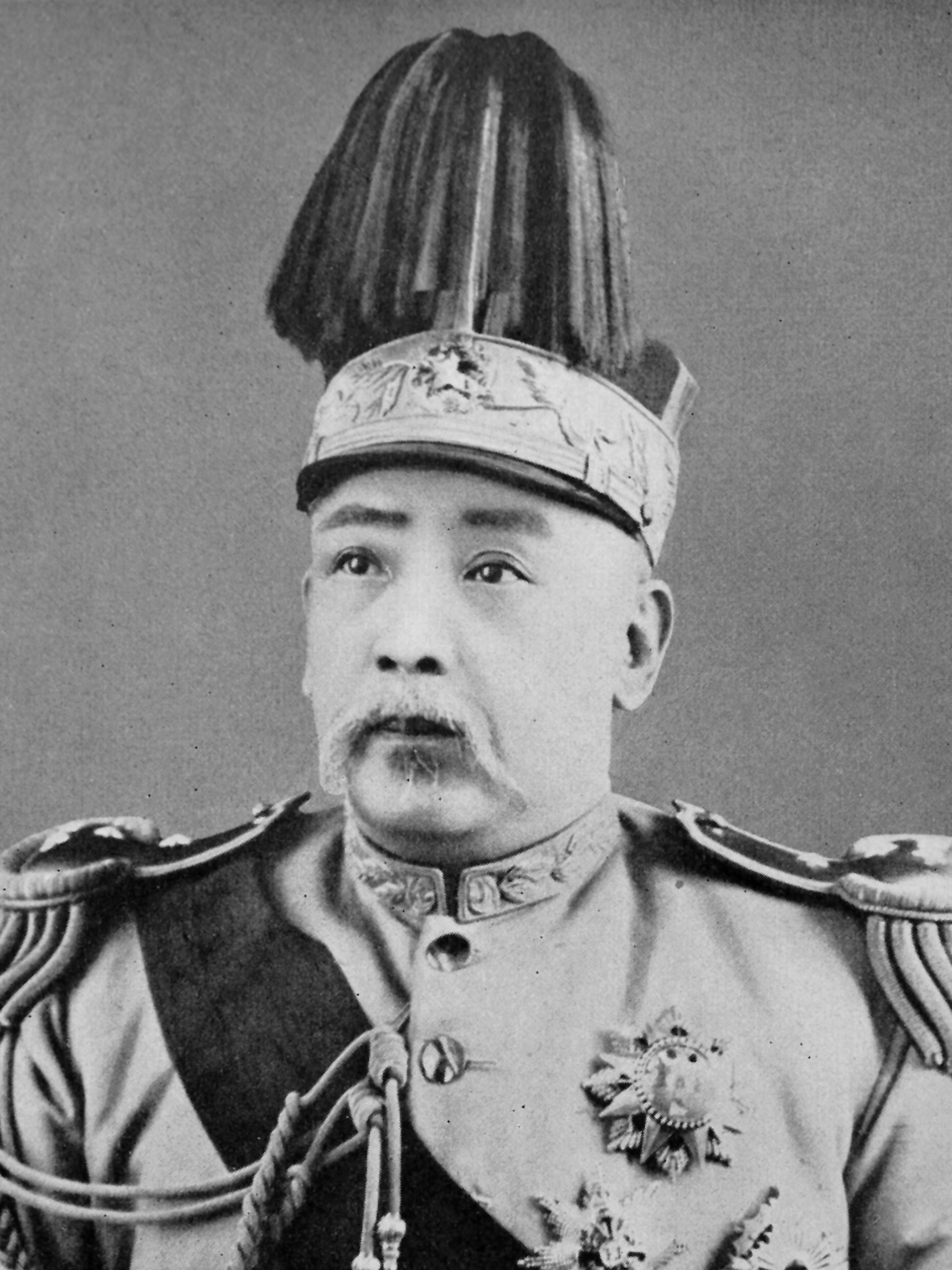
Yuan Shikai

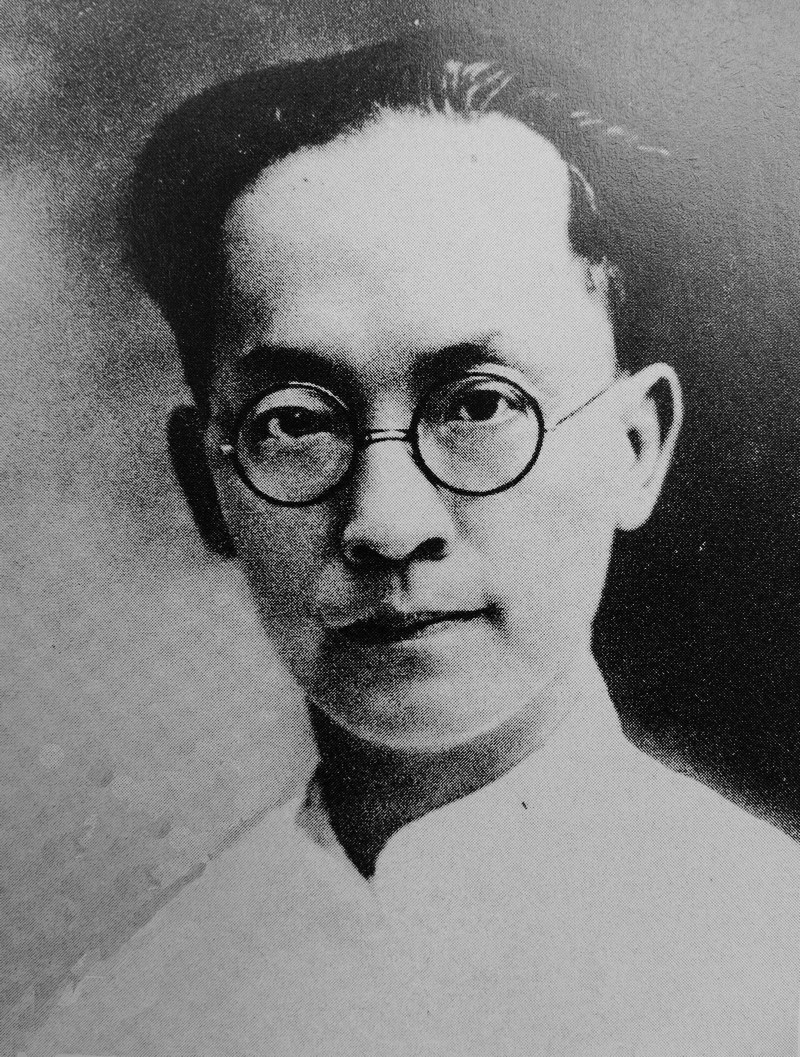
Hu Hanmin

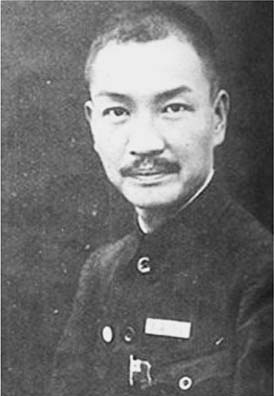
Dai Jitao

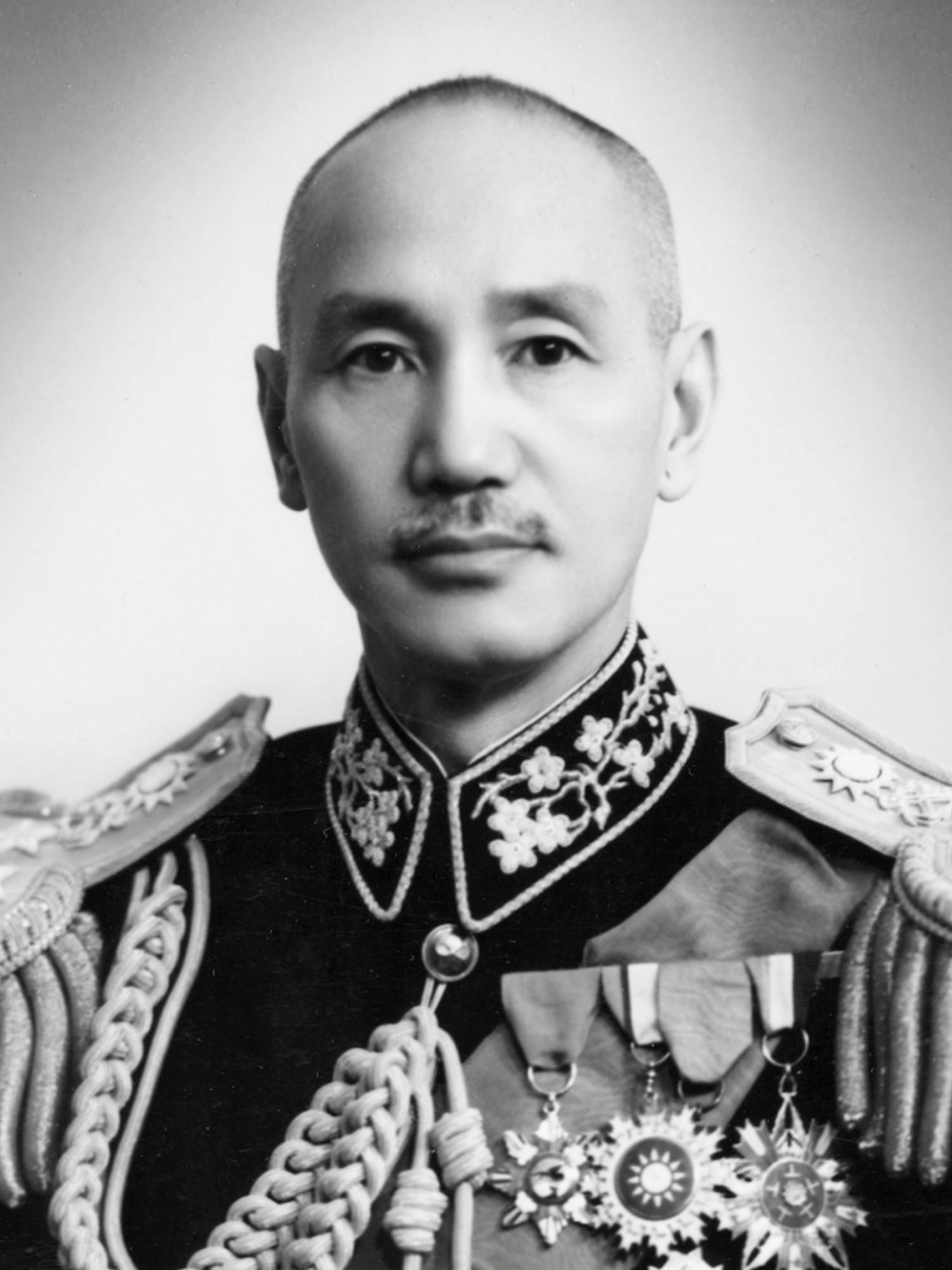
Chiang Kai-shek

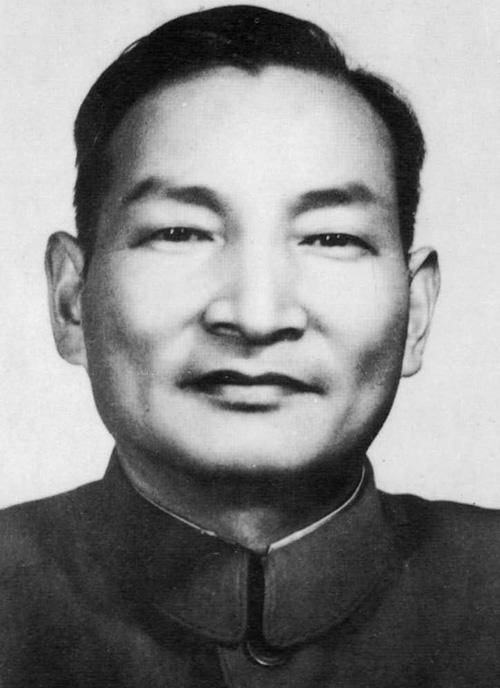
Chen Yun

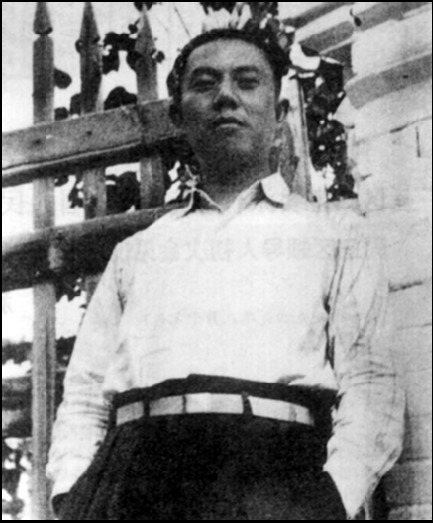
Deng Liqun

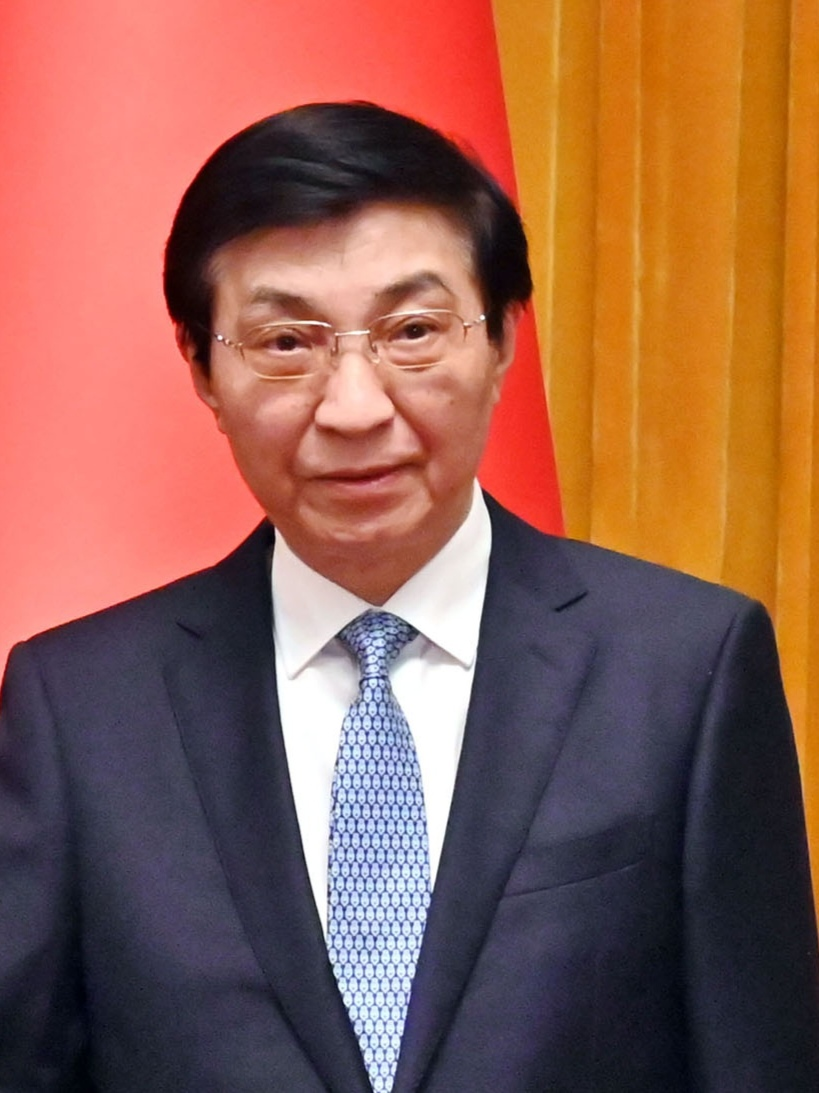
Wang Huning

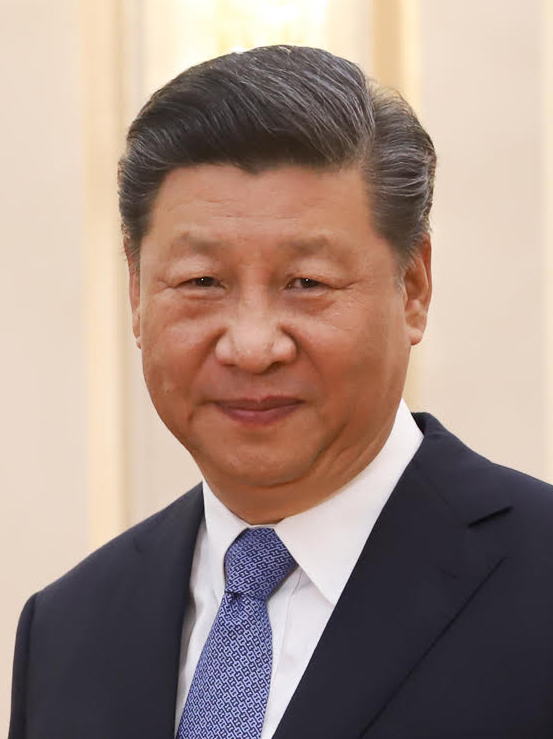
Xi Jinping

=== Hong Kong ===
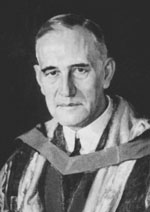
Cecil Clementi

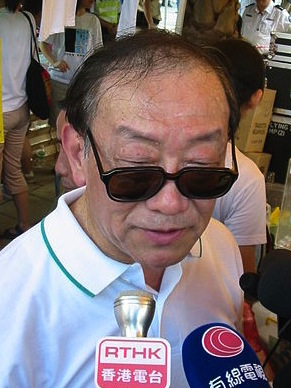
Allen Lee

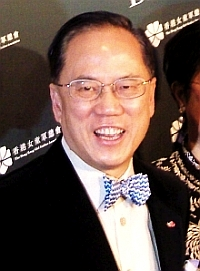
Donald Tsang

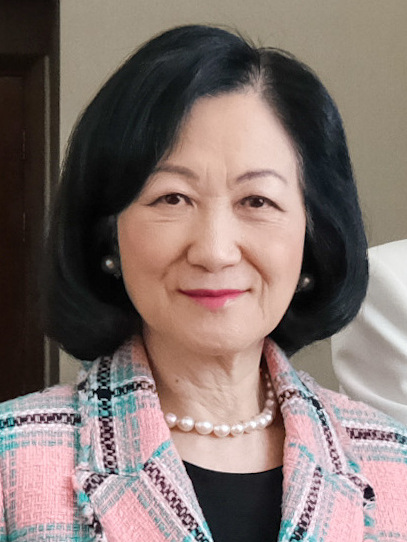
Regina Ip

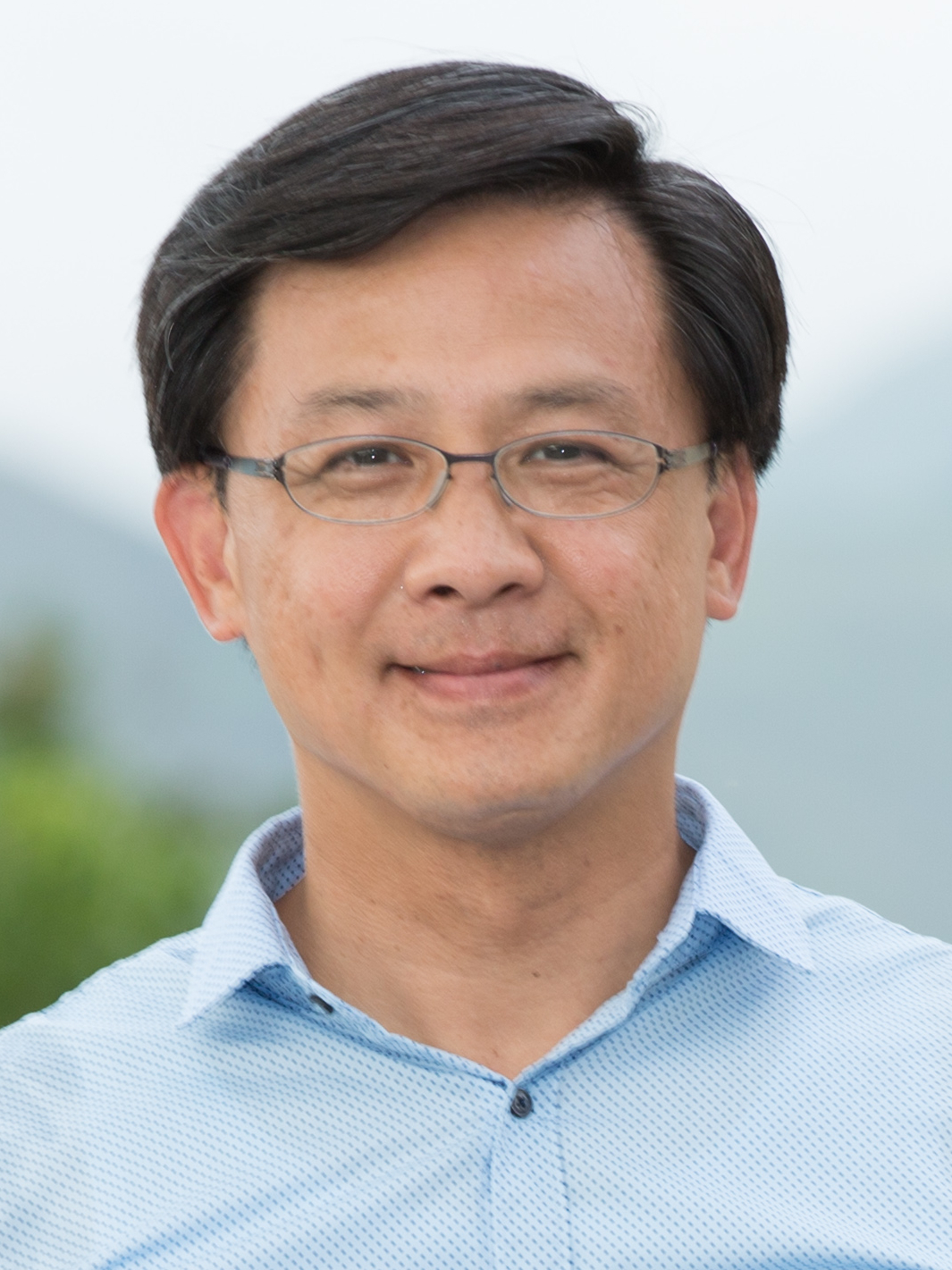
Junius Ho

=== Taiwan (Republic of China, 1949–present) ===
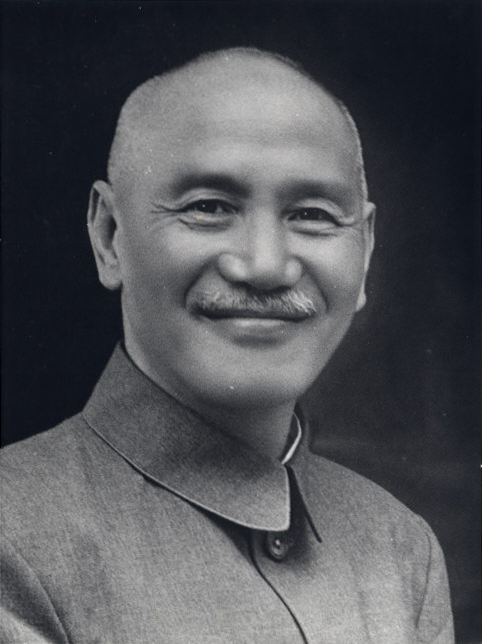
Chiang Kai-shek

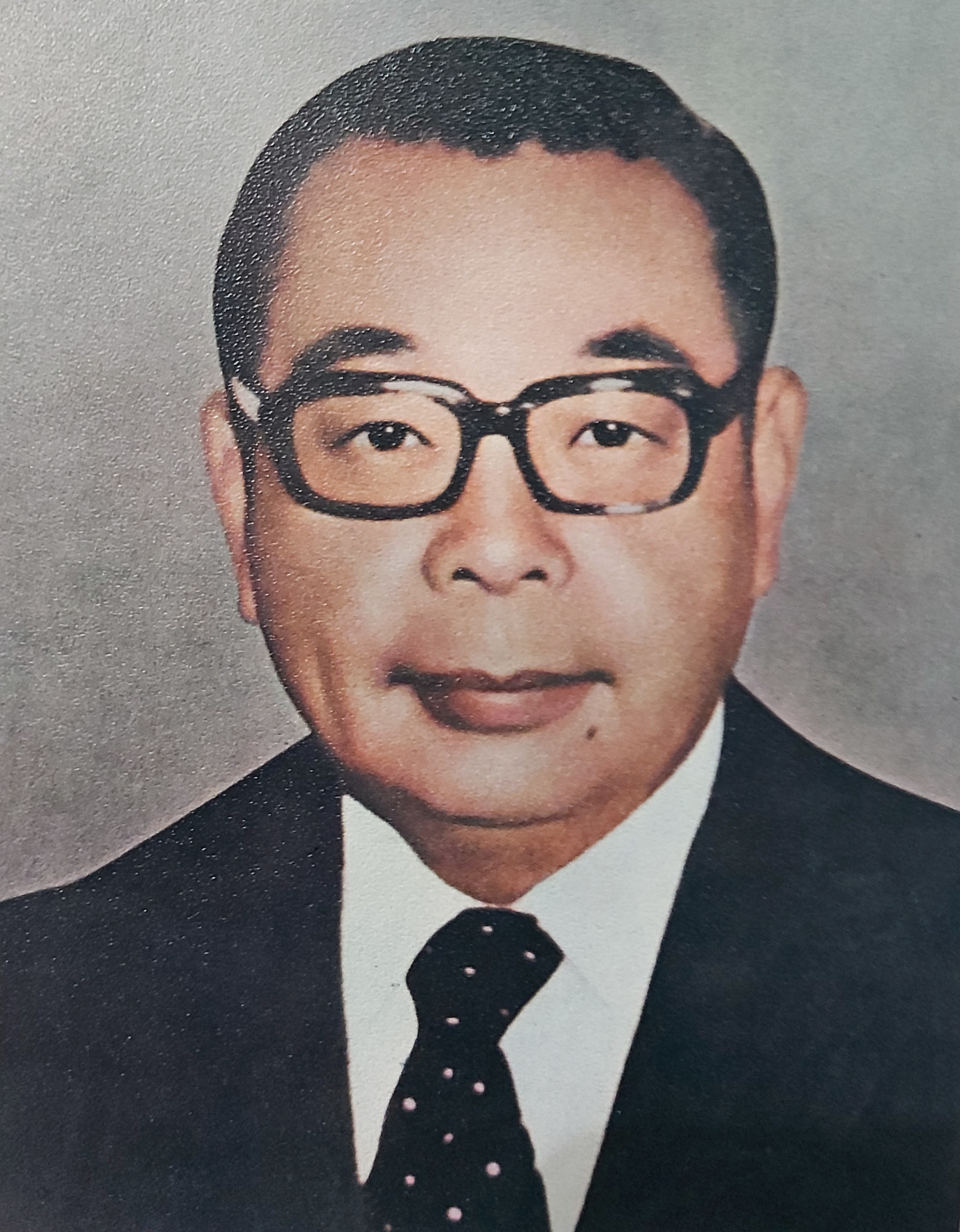
Chiang Ching-kuo

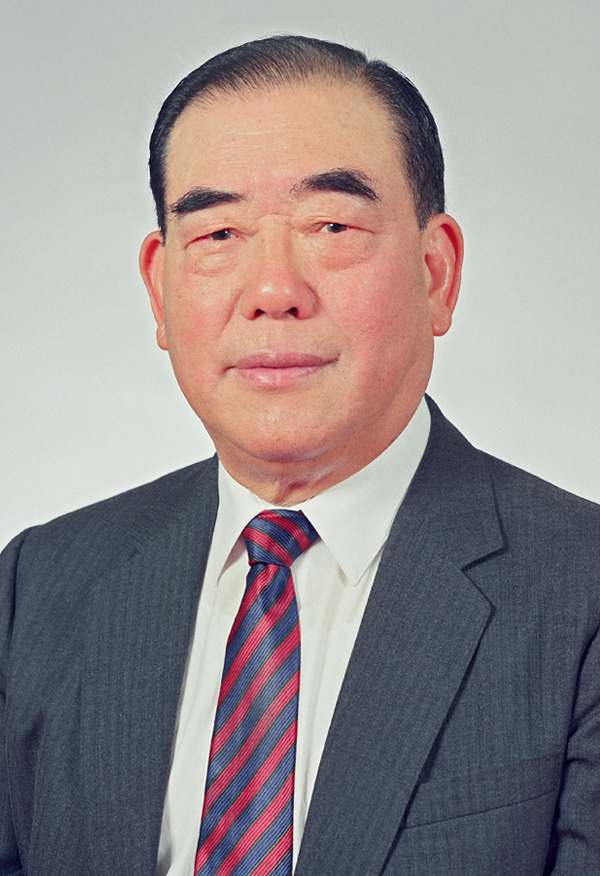
Hau Pei-tsun

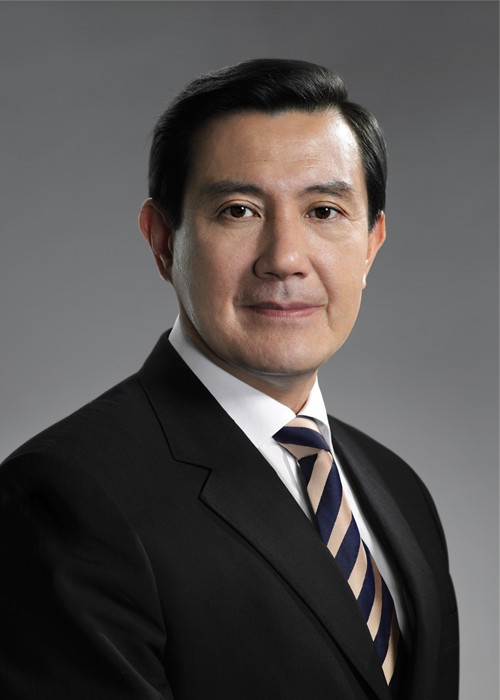
Ma Ying-jeou

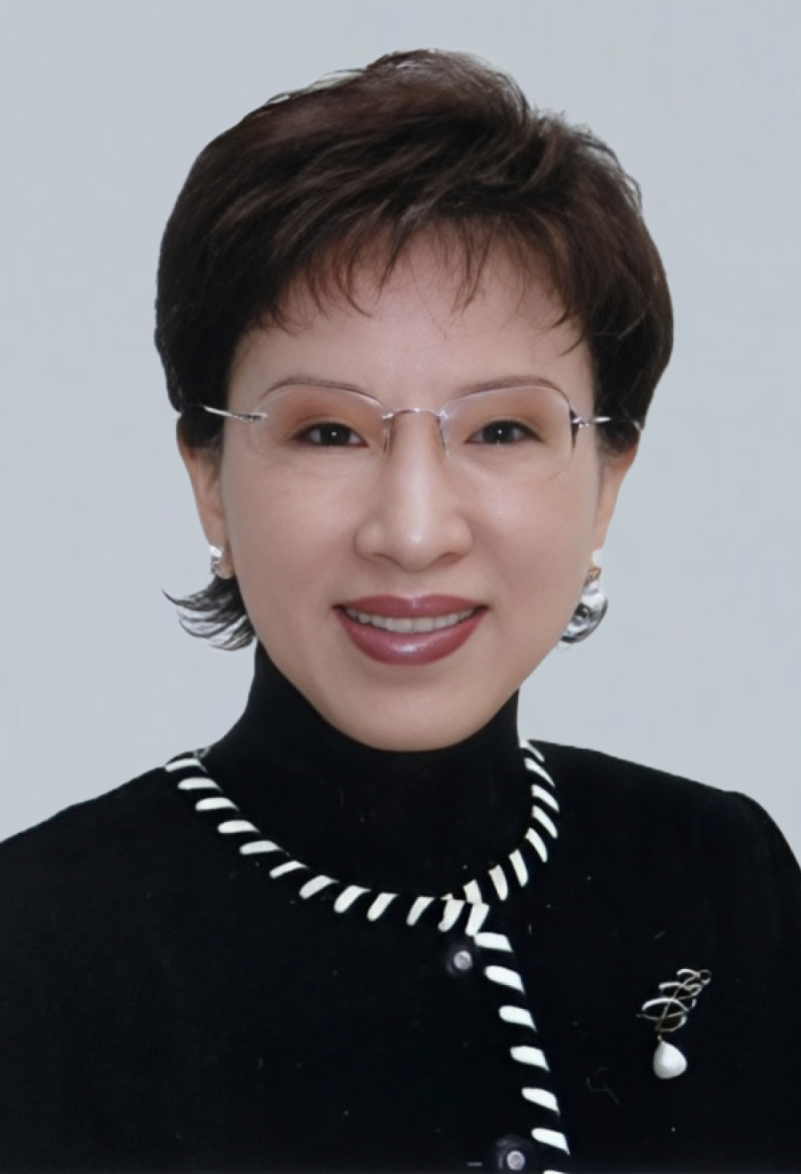
Hung Hsiu-chu

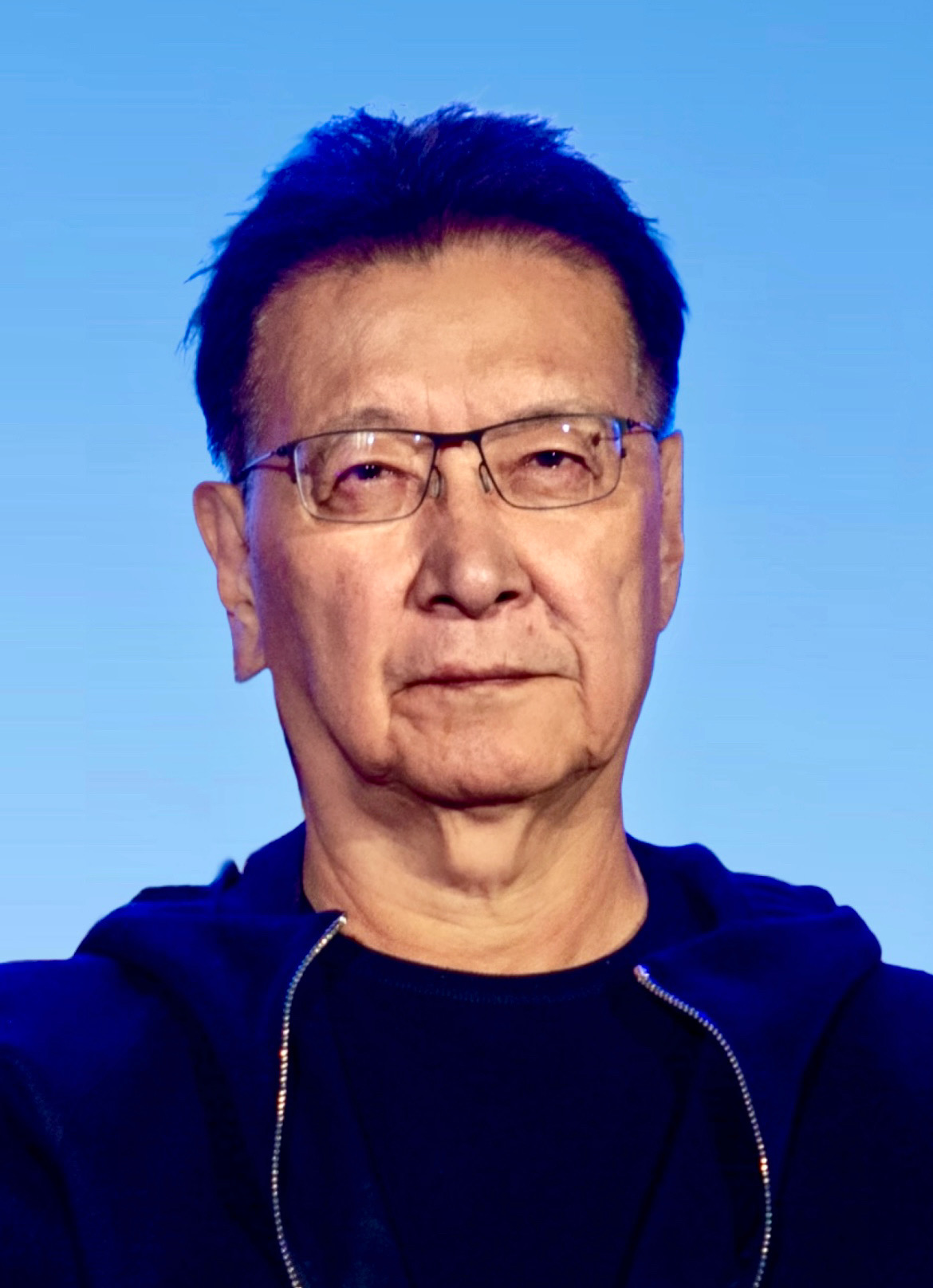
Jaw Shaw-kong

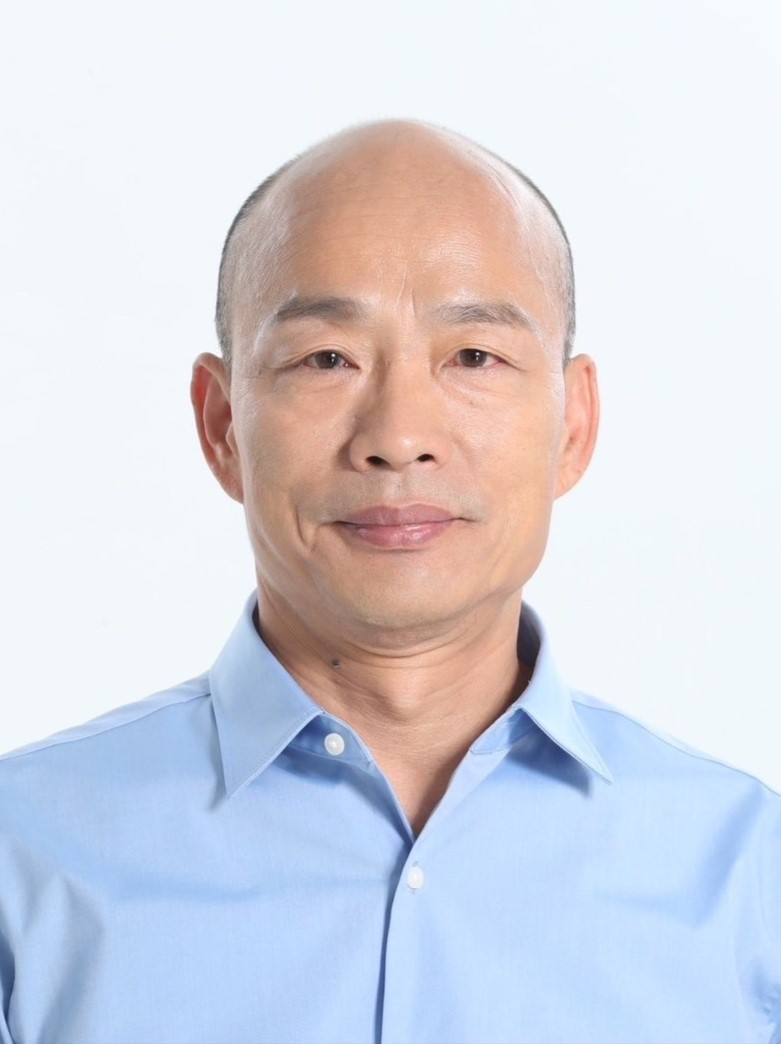
Han Kuo-yu

== See also ==
- Conservatism in China
  - Authoritarian conservatism in China
  - Cultural conservatism in China
  - Ultraconservatism in China
- Anti-communism in China
- Chinese culture
- Chinese state nationalism
- Civilization state
- Han chauvinism
- Liberalism in China
- Monarchism in China
- New Confucianism
- Pro-Republic of China
  - Pro-ROC camp in Hong Kong
- United fronts (Hong Kong, Taiwan)
- Conservatism abroad
  - Conservatism in India
  - Conservatism in Japan
  - Conservatism in Russia
  - Conservatism in South Korea
