= Beliefs Soar =

2012 Hong Kong play

- Original title: 讓黃雀飛
- Original language: Cantonese
- Written by: Lit Ming-wai; Wei Siu-lik
- Music by: Adrian Chow Pok-yin; Denis Ng
- Subject: June Fourth Incident
- Genre: Historical

Premiere
- Date: June 15, 2012
- Place: Hong Kong Arts Centre
- Directed by: Carmen Lo Ching-man

Beliefs Soar (Chinese: 讓黃雀飛) is a Hong Kong play first performed in 2012 by Stage 64. The premiere version was written by Lit Ming-wai and Wei Siu-lik, and directed by Carmen Lo Ching-man. The play centers on Operation Yellowbird, interwoven with social movements around 2010, the Anti-Hong Kong Express Rail Link movement and the Five Constituencies Referendum, to contrast two generations' struggles and contradictions in their pursuit of democracy.

The premiere took place on 15 June 2012, at the Hong Kong Arts Centre. A 2013 school tour version added a new ending featuring the Anti-Moral and National Education movement. A later revision, Beliefs Soar (Rerun) (Note: Chinese 《黃雀飛——佔領中環版》lit. 'Beliefs Soar — Occupy Central Version ') incorporated scenes from the Umbrella Movement and was performed on 26 July 2013, at the Ngau Chi Wan Civic Centre.

== Production background ==
Stage 64 was founded in 2009 by a group of volunteers from the Hong Kong Alliance in Support of Patriotic Democratic Movements of China. The troupe aims to commemorate and educate the public about the June Fourth Incident through theatre. Their debut work, Edelweiss, focusing on the tragedy and struggles of the protesters, attracted wide attention. Beliefs Soar is their second production, exploring the post-Tiananmen Operation Yellowbird, the challenges of democratic ideals, collective negotiation, and historical trauma. During production, the team referenced the escape experiences of student leader Chai Ling.

Operation Yellowbird was a secret rescue mission organized by Hong Kong civilians to help Chinese dissidents wanted by the government flee the mainland. Through underground networks and smuggling routes, hundreds of activists were successfully brought to Hong Kong and later to destinations such as the United States and France. Participants included Hong Kong democrats, entertainers, and even triad members, with covert assistance from the British colonial authorities. Due to the mission's sensitive nature, many details were revealed only in recent years, and some participants have stated that many more shall remain undisclosed.

== Plot ==
In Beijing, 1989, student leader Hong Ming and his girlfriend Hiu Ching join the pro-democracy movement. Amid growing internal divisions and external pressure, they argue over whether to withdraw from Tiananmen Square. When the army enters and gunfire erupts, Hong Ming becomes separated from his comrades in the chaos. Haunted by guilt and fear, he and Hiu Ching begin a perilous escape.

In Hong Kong, 2010, social activists Ken and Chelsea meet during the Anti-Hong Kong Express Rail Link movement. However, during the Five Constituencies Referendum and debates over political reform, their differing beliefs drive them apart. One advocates rational dialogue and institutional reform, while the other favors direct, radical actions. As tensions rise, their relationship deteriorates. The heated debates within the play reflect the contradictions within social movements — between persistence and compromise — echoing the dilemmas faced by the 1989 students over whether to stay or withdraw from the square.

The play runs on two parallel timelines, intertwining the fates of two generations to portray the long-term impact of the Tiananmen Incident on Hong Kong society. When 1989's Hong Ming faces a life-or-death choice, 2010's Ken also struggles between ideals and reality. Hiu Ching's flight and Chelsea's perseverance resonate across time and space.

The second act centers on Hong Ming's later memories and trauma as he reflects on failure, exile, and the true meaning of democracy. The final scenes often change according to current events in Hong Kong — with different versions incorporating the Anti-Hong Kong Express Rail Link movement, the Five Constituencies Referendum, the Anti-Moral and National Education movement, or the Umbrella Movement.

== Music ==
"Yellow Bird (Cantonese version)" (Note: Chinese title 〈黃雀飛〉lit. 'Yellow Bird Flies') — Theme song, composed, written, and performed by Denis Ng. It later became one of Hong Kong's representative songs for the June Fourth Incident.

"Yellow Bird" — A symbolic anthem for democratic movements.

〈推土機前種花〉 lit. '"Planting Flowers Before the Bulldozers"' — Original song, inspired by Maggie Chau Yee-mei's book of the same Chinese title. (Note: the English title is Our Home, Sham Shui Po)

== Reception ==
Critic of the International Association of Theatre Critics (Hong Kong) remarked that the dual-story structure of the play diluted its focus. While portraying the conflicts between an activist couple made the themes more accessible, the treatment was somewhat superficial. Nonetheless, he praised the creative team's sincerity in confronting collective historical trauma.
