= Wu Jiaxiang =

Chinese writer

- 吴稼祥
- Born: October 7, 1955 (age 71); Tongling County, Anhui, China
- Education: Peking University
- Occupations: Scholar, writer, public intellectual
- Years active: 1989–present
- Known for: Neoauthoritarianism
- Notable work: The Empire In A Nutshell
- Movement: Tiananmen Square protests of 1989

Wu Jiaxiang (simplified Chinese: 吴稼祥; traditional Chinese: 吳稼祥; pinyin: Wú Jiàxiáng; born 7 October 1955) is a Chinese scholar and writer who held various political roles in the Chinese government. In 2015 he was a visiting scholar at the Fairbank Center for East Asian Research at Harvard University.

== Biography ==
Wu was born and raised in Datong Town of Tongling County, Anhui. After the Cultural Revolution, he entered Peking University, majoring in economics. After graduation, he was assigned to the Publicity Department of the Chinese Communist Party as an official, then he worked in the Secretariat and General Office of the Chinese Communist Party. In 1989, during the 1989 Tiananmen Square protests and massacre, he was arrested by the Beijing Public Security Bureau and put in Qincheng Prison. He was subsequently freed in 1992. In 2000, he became a visiting scholar at the Fairbank Center for East Asian Research at Harvard University.

== Work ==
- The Empire In A Nutshell (Chinese: 果壳里的帝国)
