= Xiao Gongqin =

Chinese historian

Professor Xiao Gongqin
- 萧功秦
- Born: 1945 (age 80–81); Xi'an, Shaanxi, China

Academic background
- Education: Nanjing University (1981)
- Influences: Edmund Burke, Friedrich Hayek, Samuel P. Huntington, Yan Fu

Academic work
- Discipline: History
- Sub-discipline: Modern Chinese history
- School or tradition: Neoauthoritarianism
- Institutions: Shanghai Normal University (1982–present)

Xiao Gongqin (born September 1945; simplified Chinese: 萧功秦; traditional Chinese: 蕭功秦; pinyin: Xiāo Gōngqín) is a Chinese historian and leading exponent of neoauthoritarianism. A professor at Shanghai Normal University, Xiao's historical research has focused on the period between the late Qing dynasty and the early Republic of China. From 1989 onwards, Xiao became involved in the debate over China's reform process, arguing for incremental reform based on China's particular national character and the replacement of Marxism by Chinese nationalism.

== Academic career ==
Xiao was born in Xi'an in 1946 to a family of Hunanese origin. He graduated high school in 1965, and subsequently taught himself while working in the suburbs of Shanghai until he was admitted to read history as a graduate student at Nanjing University in 1978. He received a master's degree at Nanjing in 1981, and in 1982 took up a position at Shanghai Normal University, where he was subsequently given the rank of associate professor in 1987—an unusual promotion given his lack of a doctorate. Xiao's original interest was the Yuan dynasty, but from the mid-1980s he turned his attention to the history of the late Qing and early Republican periods.

In his early academic career, Xiao studied the thought of Yan Fu, an influential Chinese scholar and Westerniser of this era, questioning the negative historical reputation that had become attached to Yan because of his later support for conservative projects such as Yuan Shikai's attempted monarchist restoration. Xiao came to the conclusion that Yan was a consistent incremental reformist who had struck a middle course between outright reaction and the wholesale abandonment of China's national identity. Building on his work on Yan, Xiao went on to make a broader reevaluation of the fall of the Qing dynasty, arguing that the Hundred Days' Reform of 1898 failed primarily not because of the conservatism of Cixi but because of the radicalism of Kang Youwei and his allies.

== Political views ==
When people who advocate for moderate rationality become the true mainstream of society, the centrist becomes the decisive majority, and the extremist truly falls into marginalization, then the ideological and cultural conditions that carry democratic politics mature. And the spring of democratization in China will coming soon.

— Xiao Gongqin

Beginning in 1989, Xiao applied his historical research directly to the politics of reform in China. He became a prominent supporter of the "Southern School" of neoauthoritarianism in the 1990s, also known as "neoconservatism", which Xiao introduced at a conference attended by prominent politicians and intellectuals in December 1990. Arguing that the Communist Party should abandon Marxism in favour of Chinese nationalism, Xiao supported strong leadership to guide an incremental process of modernisation, as well as the ideological incorporation of Confucian influences, and criticised the "blind adoption of Western models to China's modernization".

Xiao continues to support eventual democratisation, holding that China can follow a path similar to that of Taiwan once the middle class is predominant enough. He views the separation between economics and politics as important in this light: though the market might create democracy, democracy cannot create the market, and the state must therefore be strong enough to enforce the legal prerequisites for a functioning market system.

Xiao states that he identifies primarily as an academic rather than a political adviser, and regrets his identification with political forces. Ma Yong, however, a historian of the late Qing period, has criticised Xiao as a non-specialist manipulating history for political purposes.

According to Chen Chun, Xiao is a liberal conservative. Xiao himself is also influenced by liberal conservatives such as Edmund Burke and Yan Fu.
