= Lo Hoi-sing =

Lo Hoi-sing (Chinese: 羅海星; pinyin: Luó Hǎixīng; 1949 – 14 January 2010) was a Hong Kong businessman born into a communist Hong Kong family. He was famous for rescuing Chinese dissidents in Operation Yellowbird after the Tiananmen Square protests of 1989, for which he was arrested in 1989. He was later released at the request of British Prime Minister John Major in 1991.

== Biography ==
Lo was born in 1949 to Lo Fu (羅孚), a communist Chinese editor of a Hong Kong newspaper. He was raised and educated in Hong Kong and later continued his studies in the city of Guangzhou, where he experienced the Cultural Revolution during the 1960s. He later returned to Hong Kong and began working for a communist newspaper, like his father.

Lo ended his ties with the Communist Party when his father was arrested by the Chinese government. He instead began working in Beijing as the chief representative for the Trade Development Council of Hong Kong, but he resigned the post in early 1989 after seeking business opportunities in trade between Hong Kong and the PRC.

Lo was married to children's author Chow Mat-mat (Zhou Mimi), the daughter of the well known writer Huang Qingyun.

Lo died in 2010 at Queen Mary Hospital in Pok Fu Lam from the combined effects of a lung infection, diabetes, and a weakened immune system.
