= Huang Qingyun =

Writer of children's literature

- 黃慶雲
- Born: 10 May 1920; British Hong Kong
- Died: 20 September 2018 (aged 98)
- Education: Sun Yat-sen University
- Alma mater: Teachers College, Columbia University
- Children: Chow Mat-mat
- Relatives: Lo Hoi-sing
- Writing career
- Genre: Children's literature
- Notable work: The Strange Red Star
- Notable awards: Best Artist Award from the Hong Kong Arts Development Council

Huang Qingyun (Chinese: 黃慶雲; Wade–Giles: Huang Ch'ing-yün; 10 May 1920 – 20 September 2018), or Wong Hing-wan in Cantonese, was a Hong Kong-Chinese writer of children's literature and magazine publisher. She published the only Chinese-language children's magazine in China and Hong Kong during World War II, and later served as Vice President of the Guangdong Writers Association. Considered a pioneer of children's literature in Hong Kong, she received the Best Artist Award from the Hong Kong Arts Development Council in 2009.

== Biography ==
Huang was born in British Hong Kong in 1920. She studied at Sun Yat-sen University in Guangzhou (Canton), Guangdong, China, and received her master's degree from the Teachers College, Columbia University in New York, the United States.

In 1941, she established the bi-monthly magazine Modern Children (新兒童), the only Chinese-language children's magazine in China and Hong Kong that was published during World War II. In "Letters to Big Sister Wan", a distinguished feature in the magazine, Huang, using the pen name Sister Wan (雲姐姐), corresponded with young readers. She encouraged them to study and helped them cope with life in wartime, when Hong Kong and much of China fell under Japanese occupation.

After the end of World War II, the British authorities closed Huang's magazine in 1948 for its alleged sympathy for the Chinese Communist cause. She moved to Guangzhou and stayed in mainland China after the Communist takeover in 1949. She served as vice-president of the Guangdong Writers Association in the People's Republic of China.

Huang moved back to Hong Kong in the late 1980s. Still active in the literary circle, she also became widely known as the mother-in-law of Lo Hoi-sing, the political activist who helped Chinese dissidents escape China after the Tiananmen Square protests of 1989. Lo was the husband of Chow Mat-mat (Zhou Mimi), who also became a well known children's writer under her mother's influence.

Huang died on 20 September 2018, at the age of 98.

== Selected works and awards ==
Huang published more than 60 books over a career spanning more than seven decades. Her works include:

- The Strange Red Star (奇異的紅星, 1956)
- Flowers in Full Bloom (花兒朵朵開, 1966)
- Daughter of the Moon (月亮的女兒, 1982)
- A Golden Childhood (金色童年, 1985)

She twice won the Hong Kong Chinese Literature Prize for Children's Literature, for The Smart Dog and the Ever-Changing Cat (聰明狗和百變貓) and Strange Adventure of the Cat QQ (貓咪QQ的奇遇). In 2009, she received the Best Artist Award from the Hong Kong Arts Development Council.
