= Wang Luxiang =

Chinese art critic (born 1956)

Wang Luxiang (Chinese: 王鲁湘, born 1956), is a Chinese scholar, art critic, and television documentary producer.

== Biography ==
Wang Luxiang received his Bachelor of Arts in literature from the Xiangtan University (1978–1982) and held a teaching position in the Chinese literature department of the same university from 1982 to 1984. Soon he went on to obtain a master's degree in Philosophy at Beijing University in 1987. He taught literature at the Capital Normal University from 1987 to 1992 and did freelance writing jobs from 1992 to 2001. In 2001, he was invited to the newly formed department of art at Qinghua University as a guest professor and Ph.D supervisor (the contract with Qing Hua ended in 2004). In the same year of entering the Qing Hua faculty, Wang signed a contract with Phoenix TV, the Hong Kong-based television broadcasting company as a senior director. Currently, Wang is widely known in China as the Phoenix TV senior director and commentator, as author of River Elegy - the book and TV documentary that spawned the Tiananmen Square protests of 1989, as chief secretary and permanent board member of the Li Keran Art Foundation, as a permanent board member of the Huang Binhong Research Association and as a board member of the Huang Zhou Art Foundation.

== Research ==
Art aesthetic study; literature study; Shan shui painting research and teaching; documentary making; traditional Chinese culture research.

== Bibliography ==
- Modern Western Aesthetics in the Eyes of Westerns Scholars. Co-authored. (1987). Peking University Press
- Systems of Modern Aesthetics. Co-authored. (1988). Peking University Press
- China’s Cultural Heritage: rediscovering a past of 7000 years. Wang, L. X. (1995). Morning Glory Press. English, French and German edition: Morning Glory Press.
- Greatness Over the Ice: an in-depth study of the works of Huang Bin Hong. Wang, L. X. (1999). Hebei Education Press.
- Son of the Great Mountains: discovering Zhang Ding. Wang, L. X. (2000). Hebei Education Press.
- Huang Bin Hong. Wang, L. X. (2000). Hebei Education Press.
- Folk Architecture of China. Wang, L. X. (2000). Zhe Jiang People's Art Publishing House
- Old Home. Wang, L. X. (2004). Zhe Jiang Photography Press.
- Land of the Great Intelligences. Wang, L. X. (2005). Culture and Art Publishing House.
- The Tai Shan of China. Wang, L. X. (2005). Foreign Language Press
- Understanding Li Ke Ran. Wang, L. X. (2007). Ji Lin Fine Art Publishing House.
- Zhang Ding. Wang, L. X. (2007). Hebei Education Press.

== Filmography/documentaries ==
- River Elegy (1988)
- The Moment of Destiny (1989)
- Residential Houses of China (1989)
- Real Estate in Shan Xi (1993)
- Jiao Mo (dry ink technique) (1993)
- Chasing Your Dreams in Huang Shan (1994)
- Mai Ke (the freelance reaper) (1995)
- The Tai Shan of China (1995)
- A New Look at the Yellow River (1997)
- Mount Hua/Hua Shan (1997)
- China: 20 Years of Reformation and Opening (1998)
- Jing De Zhen (2000)
- The Pu Tuo Mountain of China (2003)

== Television programmes ==
- In Search of Lost Homes
- Three Gorges Forever
- Across China with Wang Luxiang
- A Culture Tour with Wang Luxiang
- In Class with Wang Luxiang
- The Wisdom of the East

In addition, Wang has produced hundreds of articles in the fields of literature, film study, art critique and critical commentary.
