= Su Xiaokang =

Chinese writer

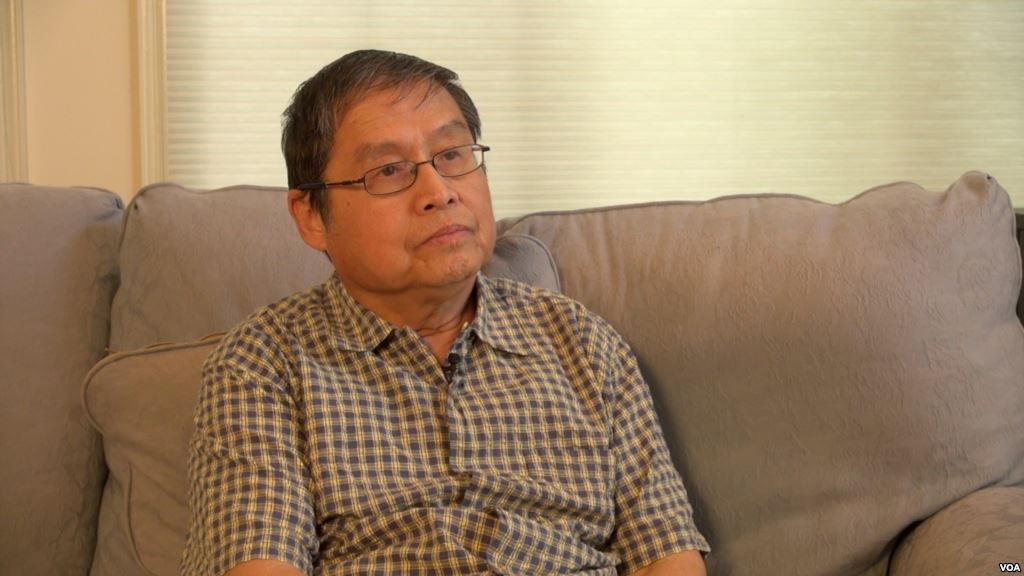
Su Xiaokang in 2014

Su Xiaokang (Chinese: 苏晓康; born 1949) is an intellectual, writer, journalist, political activist and in 1989 was named one of China's seven most-wanted dissident intellectuals. His most notable work River Elegy paved the way to the Tiananmen Square protests of 1989, and his participation in the protest also forced him into the exile in the aftermath of the Tiananmen Square Massacre. Su currently resides in Delaware, in the United States.

== Early life ==
Su came from an intellectual family: His father Su Pei was the vice-president of the Central Party School and his mother was a reporter of Guangming Daily. Su attended a technical college for higher education. Due to his intellectual background, he was sent to a rural area as a laborer during the Cultural Revolution. After the Cultural Revolution, Su became a reporter for Henan Daily and later People's Daily, and served as a lecturer at the Beijing Broadcasting Institute and later Beijing Normal University.

== River Elegy ==
Su Xiaokang was highly praised by scholars and intellectuals in the 1980s, seen as one of the most iconic and popular liberal writers. Su wrote the script for the controversial and thought-provoking documentary River Elegy, a six-part documentary that narrated the decline of Chinese civilization and culture, highlighted the differences between the "transparency" of democracy and the "opacity" of an autocracy, and subtly critiqued the political system under Communist Party rule. The documentary was inspirational to numerous university students and became instrumental to the beginning of the Tiananmen Square protests.

== 1989 Tiananmen Square Protests ==
Su, along with 50 writers and novelists, participated the protests in May before the arrival of Soviet General Secretary Mikhail S. Gorbachev. Su voiced his support to the students and said, "The students should not be allowed to stand alone". On May 19, Su and other intellectuals signed a petition demanding democracy in China:

We, as intellectuals, in the name of our personal integrity and all our moral rectitude, with our body and mind, with all our dignity as individuals, solemnly swear never to retreat in the quest for democracy pioneered by the students with their blood and lives, never under any pretext to disengage ourselves because of cowardice, never to allow again the humiliations of the past, never to sell out our moral integrity, never to submit ourselves to dictatorship, never to pledge allegiance to the last emperors of the China of the 80's.

Despite Su's vocal support of the student movement, on May 13, he went to the square and attempted to persuade the students to withdraw from the hunger strike, as he suspected the hunger strike might escalate into a "bloodbath". His books were banned from sale and publication immediately after the crackdown, River Elegy was denounced officially by the Communist Party, proclaiming it was counter-revolutionary.

== Exile ==
After the crackdown on June 4, the Chinese Communist Party accused Su Xiaokang as one of the "blackhands" behind the protest, subsequently charging him with the crime of "inciting counter-revolutionary propaganda"; his exile began in an effort to escape the arrest warrant. During the exile, Su had to hide in the mountains and remote villages for three months before Operation Yellowbird successfully smuggled him to Hong Kong. Su proceeded to France and later reunited with his wife and son in United States. Since the beginning of exile, Su has actively participated in speeches and seminars to advocate for a democracy movement in China. He founded a web-based magazine called Democratic China to continue the pro-democracy movement.

Su wrote his memoir, titled A Memoir of Misfortune, published in 1997 in Chinese and in 2001 in English. The memoir documents the hardship he and his family endured after his exile and a tragic automobile accident in the Buffalo City that paralyzed his wife. After A Memoir of Misfortune, Su wrote another book, The Loneliness of Delaware Bay, telling of the struggles and the challenges he faced since moving to the United States. In 2013, Su published The Era of Slaying the Dragon, tackling subjects from Mao's Great Leap Forward and other atrocities occurring under the Chinese Communist Party's rule.

In 2003, Su returned to China for his father's funeral under three conditions imposed by the Chinese government:

- No interviews with the press.
- No making speeches.
- No meeting with political activists.

Su's story was also featured in the Home coming campaign, funded and founded by Chu Yiu Ming, with a goal to restore the exiled democracy activists' right to return to China.
