= River Elegy =

Chinese television series (1988)

- Traditional Chinese: 河殤
- Simplified Chinese: 河殇
- Hanyu Pinyin: Héshāng
- Written by: Wang Luxiang; Su Xiaokang
- Directed by: Wang Luxiang
- No. of episodes: 6

Original release
- Network: CCTV-1
- Release: 11 June – 28 June 1988

River Elegy (simplified Chinese: 河殇; traditional Chinese: 河殤; pinyin: Héshāng) is an influential six-part documentary by Wang Luxiang, and co-written by Su Xiaokang, shown on China Central Television on 11 June 1988, which portrays the decline of traditional Chinese culture.

== Synopsis ==
The film asserts that the Ming dynasty's ban on maritime activities is comparable to the building of the Great Wall by China's first emperor Ying Zheng. China's land-based civilization was defeated by maritime civilizations backed by modern sciences, and was further challenged with the problem of life and death ever since the latter half of the 19th century, landmarked by the Opium Wars. Using the analogy of the Yellow River, China was portrayed as once at the forefront of civilization, but subsequently dried up due to isolation and conservatism. Rather, the revival of China must come from the flowing blue seas which represent the explorative, open cultures of the West and Japan.

Authors also cite several narratives to make arguments, including the "oriental despotism" and the "hydraulic empire" from Karl August Wittfogel, "Eurocentrism" from Hegel, as well as the "decline of Chinese civilization and remaining of Western civilization" from Arnold J. Toynbee. The reformist calls for economic liberalization and political democratization in River Elegy rejected the usual "(anti-)Marxist" framework and instead adopted a discourse of (anti-)modernity. This exposed the real opposition underlying reform: orthodox Marxism had become a conservative defence of China's traditional agrarian civilization, symbolized by the Yellow River. Thus, those calling themselves "socialists" or "orthodox Marxists" occupied a deeply reactionary rather than revolutionary position.

== Controversy ==
River Elegy has caused immense controversy in mainland China due to its negative portrayal of Chinese culture. Rob Gifford, a National Public Radio journalist, said that the film used images and interviews to state that the concept of "the Chinese being a wonderful ancient people with a wonderful ancient culture was a big sham, and that the entire population needed to change." Gifford said that the film's most significant point was its attack on the Yellow River, a river which was a significant element of China's historical development and which symbolizes ancient Chinese culture. Using the ancient Chinese saying that "a dipperful of Yellow River water is seven-tenths mud," the authors of the film use the river's silt and sediment as a metaphor for Confucian traditions and the significance of the traditions which the authors believe caused China to stagnate. The authors hoped that Chinese traditional culture would end and be replaced by a more modernized and open culture. The film symbolizes Chinese thinking with the "yellowness" of the Yellow River and Western thinking with the "blueness" of the ocean. The film also criticized the Great Wall, saying that it "can only represent an isolationist, conservative, and incompetent defense," the imperial dragon on the Great Wall, calling it "cruel and violent," and other Chinese symbols. The ending of River Elegy symbolized the authors' dreams with the idea of the waters of the Yellow River emptying out of the river and mixing with the ocean. Gifford said that River Elegy reveals the thoughts of young intellectuals post-Mao Zedong and pre-Tiananmen Square protests and the freedoms that appeared around 1988. Rana Mitter, Professor of the History and Politics of Modern China in Oxford University has suggested the series was perhaps the most influential TV series of all time given how it introduced critical views of China to such a large audience.

Gifford said that the film did not openly criticize the Chinese Communist Party. Instead, it contained "not-so-subtle" attacks on Chinese imperial traditions that therefore would also criticize the contemporary political system. Conservatives in mainland China attacked the film.

After the events of Tiananmen Square Protests, some staff members of River Elegy were arrested and others fled mainland China. Two of the main writers who escaped to the United States became evangelical Christians.

== Reactions and debates ==
River Elegy (Heshang) aroused immediate debates and great controversy among intellectual circles, the Party's top leadership, and even the overseas Chinese community after its first broadcast in June 1988. On 11 June 1988, Chinese Central Television (CCTV) started airing the six-part documentary series, and soon after, the People's Daily published the scripts of the film. After the first show, Heshang stirred up fierce debates among university students and intellectuals. Many journals and universities organized several seminars including the "Heshang Month" in Wuhan and the "Heshang week" in Tianjin to discuss the series and its content, which was called the "Heshang Phenomenon" (Heshang xianxiang). In the beginning, debates mainly focused on the cultural significance of the film, and most audience comments were very positive. Many viewers regarded Heshang as the "beginning of a new Chinese TV culture" that was innovative in its artistic expression and cultural analysis. Since 1978, intellectuals had discussed and debated about the influence of Chinese culture and traditions on the future development of the country. Such debate, however, was limited to the scholarly sphere. Some audiences thus praised Heshang for its attempt to introduce the scholarly discussion about the impact of Chinese traditional culture to the public. More importantly, they considered the film the first Chinese documentary that dared to criticize the "backwardness" of Chinese traditional culture and social problems at the time.

=== Official attention ===
Political controversy about Heshang arose and attracted attention from the Party's top leadership when a university president phoned Hu Qili, a pro-reform officer who was a member of the Standing Committee of the Politburo and the Central Secretariat, and warned him that the series might stir up student unrest. Hu immediately contacted the minister of Radio, Film, and Television, requesting that he re-evaluate the series. Meanwhile, Zhao Ziyang, Yang Shangkun, Deng Pufang (Deng Xiaoping's son) and some other Politburo members privately screened Heshang. While Zhao and Deng had supportive attitudes toward the film, a few members of the Politburo were offended by Heshang's harsh criticism of Chinese traditions and the Party's policies since 1978, as well as its attack on Leninist theories. Confused by the divided opinions expressed from the top leadership, CCTV held internal meetings to discuss whether it should terminate broadcasting Heshang, but it did not reach a decision until the series was completely broadcast.

=== August 1988 revised version ===
Heshang was so popular that many audiences requested a repeat of the show after its first run. Given that the documentary had aroused much tension among the Party's top leaders, the Ministry of Radio, Film and Television ordered CCTV to revise the original version of the film before it could be broadcast again. In the repeat version, politically sensitive contents were either removed or toned down. The deleted contents included the film's supportive attitude toward the 1986 student demonstrations and its call for the government to establish dialogue with Chinese citizens; criticism against government corruption, inflation and the CCP's ignorance of the mentally and economically impoverished situation of Chinese intellectuals; as well as criticism against the CCP's policies and its mismanagement that caused such "man-made disasters" as the 1987 Black Dragon fire and the 1988 Shanghai hepatitis epidemic. The revised Heshang was aired in August 1988 and triggered even greater debates. At the Third Plenum of the 13th Central Committee, Wang Zhen, the then vice president, fiercely attacked Heshang by giving a long speech to criticize its "counter-revolutionary" contents. Wang insisted the film not only posed "vicious vilification" toward Chinese people, but it was also "anti-Party and anti-socialism." Wang also criticized the "blue sea civilization" that was promoted in the film as "bandit civilization and bandit logic." While some party leaders supported Wang's view, Zhao Ziyang, backed up by Yang Shangkun, argued that artistic work like Heshang conveyed cultural rather than political implications, so it should not be discussed at a political meeting. The debates between the two sides continued after the conference, until Zhao Ziyang was forced to issue two principles in dealing with the Heshang controversy. The principles urged the Party to allow the public debates without taking an official stand on the documentary, and stressed that any Party leaders' personal opinions toward the documentary did not represent the viewpoint of the Party as a whole.

=== Intellectual debates ===
The debates about Heshang were also carried on among intellectuals. Two major liberal newspapers, the Science and Technology Daily of Beijing and the World Economic Herald of Shanghai, sponsored a symposium to discuss issues raised in Heshang. Positive comments mainly praised the film as a courageous work that called for the Chinese to re-examine their traditional culture in order to get rid of the ideological obstacles that hindered the nation's further development. Some intellectuals such as Yang Zhenning and Li Zhengdao, the Nobel-Prize winners, criticized the film by pointing out that "a person [who] denies its own culture does not have a future." In addition, criticism against Heshang stressed that the film was biased and it only represented the "elitist grumblings" (gaoji laosao). For instance, the film wrongfully employed western criteria to judge China's social realities and attributed the country's current problems to the backwardness of its traditional culture. It also regarded the Great Wall, the Yellow River and the Chinese dragon as isolated symbols that represented conservativeness of Chinese traditional culture in comparison with the blue sea that symbolized the superiority of western civilization. In response to the criticism, Yuan Zhiming, the co-author of the sixth part of the documentary, argued that Heshang was not a scholarly work but rather a type of cultural product that aimed to call for Chinese people to "think about the historical heritage standing in the way of modernization". He emphasized that opening policy could not be successfully implemented, if China merely promoted economic openness without learning from western ideas and embracing cultural pluralism.

=== Debates in Taiwan and Hong Kong ===
In Taiwan and Hong Kong, newspapers and TV program reported the "Heshang fever" debates in P.R.China. People who held positive opinions toward Heshang shared the same standpoints with the ones in mainland China, whereas others criticized the film's "arbitrary" attack on Chinese traditional culture and Confucianism. Some Taiwanese believed that the documentary was wrong to blame China's backwardness on Confucianism. They argued that the Communist regime and its policies, rather than Confucianism, hindered the development of the nation's modernization. For instance, critics said that Taiwan had achieved rapid development by successfully combining Confucianism with western democratic ideas.

=== After June 4, 1989 ===
After the CCP's crackdown on the Tiananmen Square protests of 1989, the Party criticized Heshang as one of the anti-communist work that mistakenly advocated bourgeoisie-liberal ideologies and provoked student unrest. It also launched intense nationwide media attacks against the series. During a CCTV self-criticism meeting that was broadcast on the evening news across China after the June 4 crackdown, Hong Mingsheng, the vice director of Chinese Central Television, said that "'River Elegy' was a propaganda coup for bourgeois liberalization [...], it provided theoretical and emotional preparation for the recent turmoil and rebellion."
