= Chen Yizi =

Chinese scholar & economist (1940-2014)

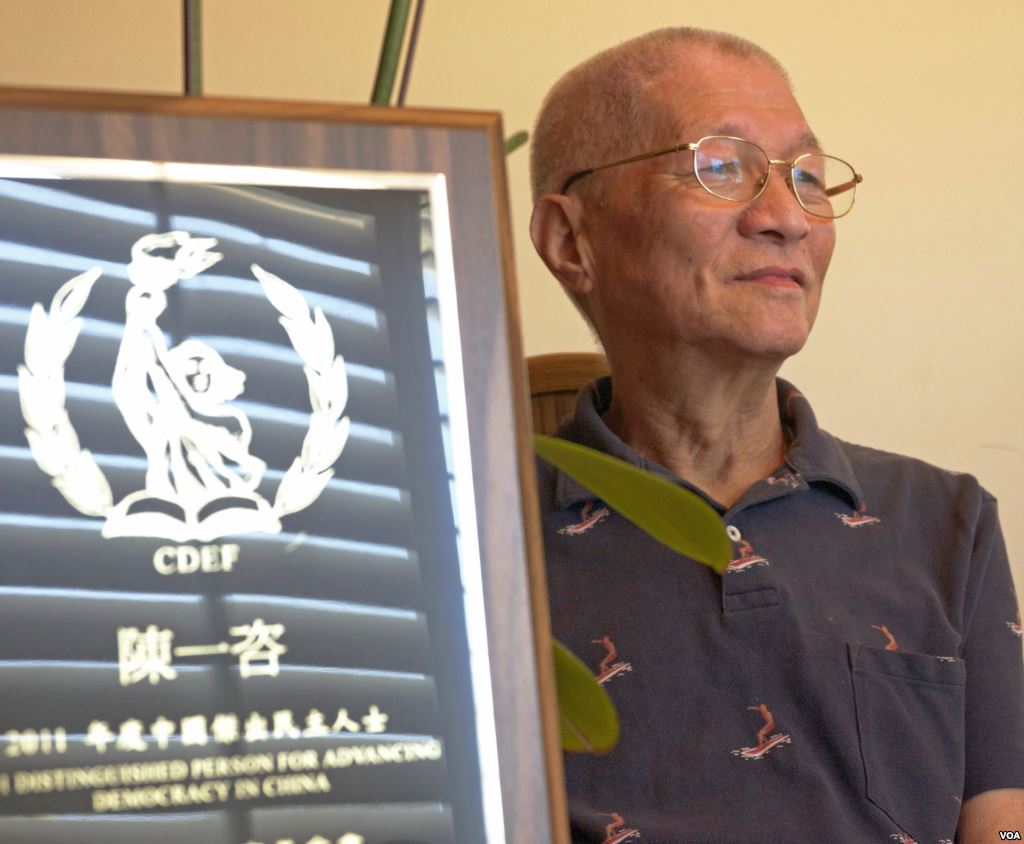
Chen Yizi

Chen Yizi (Chinese: 陈一谘; July 20, 1940 – April 14, 2014) was a Chinese neoauthoritarian scholar and economist who served as the director of China's Institute for Economic Structural Reform (中国经济体制改革研究所). Chen was a top adviser to Zhao Ziyang, General Secretary of the Chinese Communist Party between 1987 and 1989, as well as to the Chinese government.

In the 1980s, Chen Yizi was an important policy adviser for the reform and opening up in mainland China, but was exiled to the United States after defending students' protests in the Tiananmen Square Massacre in 1989. He was the most senior Chinese official known to have escaped China after the Massacre. He later established and served as the president of the Center for Modern China in Princeton, New Jersey.

== Biography ==
=== Early life ===
Chen Yizi was born in Chengdu, Sichuan on July 20, 1940. As a son of a hydro-engineer, he attended Peking University where he studied physics and Chinese.

In 1965, he was labelled as a "counterrevolutionary" for submitting a long letter to Mao Zedong, in which he criticized the lack of democracy of the Chinese Communist Party (CCP) and made a number of suggestions to the CCP as well as the Chinese government. Subsequently, Chen was persecuted during the Chinese Cultural Revolution (1966–1976), attending his struggle sessions, and was sent to receive Laogai in the countryside of Henan in 1969.

=== Top adviser for reforms ===
In 1979, Chen returned to Beijing at the beginning of China's Reform and Opening. In the 1980s, Chen became the founder of several government think tanks, and served as the director of the Institute for Economic Structural Reform (中国经济体制改革研究所) and deputy director of the Institute for Political Structural Reform (中国政治体制改革研究会). He was a senior adviser to CCP General Secretary Zhao Ziyang and played an important role in the reform and opening up.

In particular, during this time, Chen concluded 43 million (to 46 million) died in the Great Chinese Famine between 1958 and 1962, after conducting a county-by-county review of deaths in five provinces and performing extrapolation. Chen was part of a large investigation group consisting of around 200 people from the Institute for Reforms, which visited every province in mainland China and examined internal documents and records of the Communist Party.

In 1989, Chen supported the students' protest on Tiananmen Square in Beijing, seeking a peaceful solution to the crisis, but after the Tiananmen Square Massacre on June 4, 1989, he resigned from his posts and quit CCP. Many of Zhao Ziyang's aides and advisers in government think tanks were soon purged and arrested, and Chen became one of the seven most-wanted dissidents in mainland China. He first travelled to Guangdong, and then to Hainan before reaching Hong Kong.

=== Life in exile ===
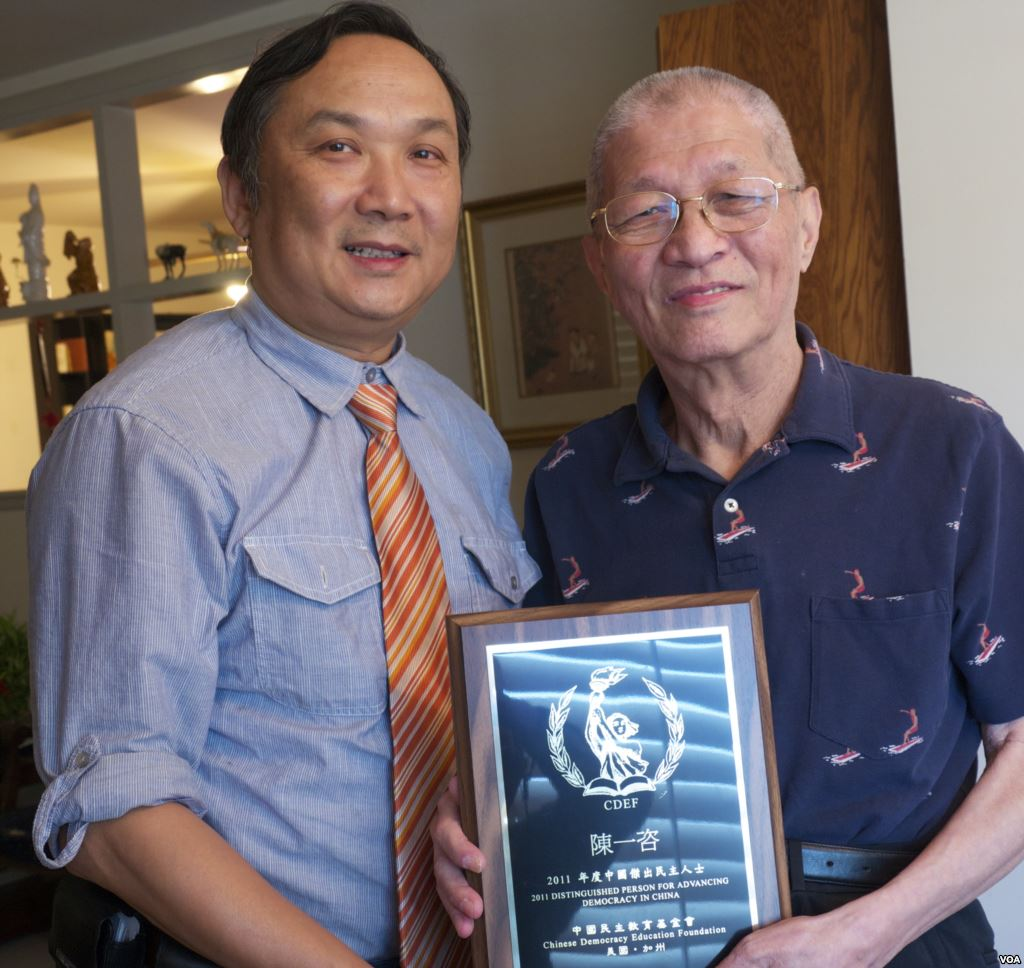
In 2011, Chen was honored the "Distinguished Person for Advancing Democracy in China".

In 1989, as the most senior Chinese official known to have escaped from China, Chen first arrived in Hong Kong, then to France, and finally to the United States, where he later established the Center for Modern China in Princeton, New Jersey together with professor Yu Ying-shih from Princeton University. He also took part in the Princeton China Initiative (普林斯顿中国学社).

In 2002, Chen was diagnosed with cancer. In 2013, Memoirs of Chen Yizi - China's Reform in the 1980s was published in Hong Kong. Chen died in Los Angeles on April 14, 2014, at the age of 73.

== See also ==
- Chinese political reforms
- Reform and opening up
- Great Chinese Famine
- Great Leap Forward
