= Shinehouse Theatre =

Coordinates: 25.0334°N 121.4948°E

Shinehouse Theater is a small theater company in Taiwan focused on contemporary literature and social issues. Founded in 2006 by director Chung Po-yuan, executive producer Zeke Lee, and administrator Nina Yeh, Shinehouse Theater has a long history of community engagement, drawing inspiration for its productions from the local stories of Wanhua. Originally located in Shilin, Taipei, the theater later relocated to Wanhua, New Taipei City, due to rent considerations. There, they develop and reinterpret various contemporary literary themes, while also creating works based on the local stories and issues of the local residents, such as the lives of sex workers and the homeless population around Longshan Temple. In 2019, Shinehouse Theater expanded its focus to contemporary dance, establishing the "Want to Dance Festival." By 2025, the festival had reached its 7th term.
