= Yuezhi Zhao =

Communication scholar

- 趙月枝
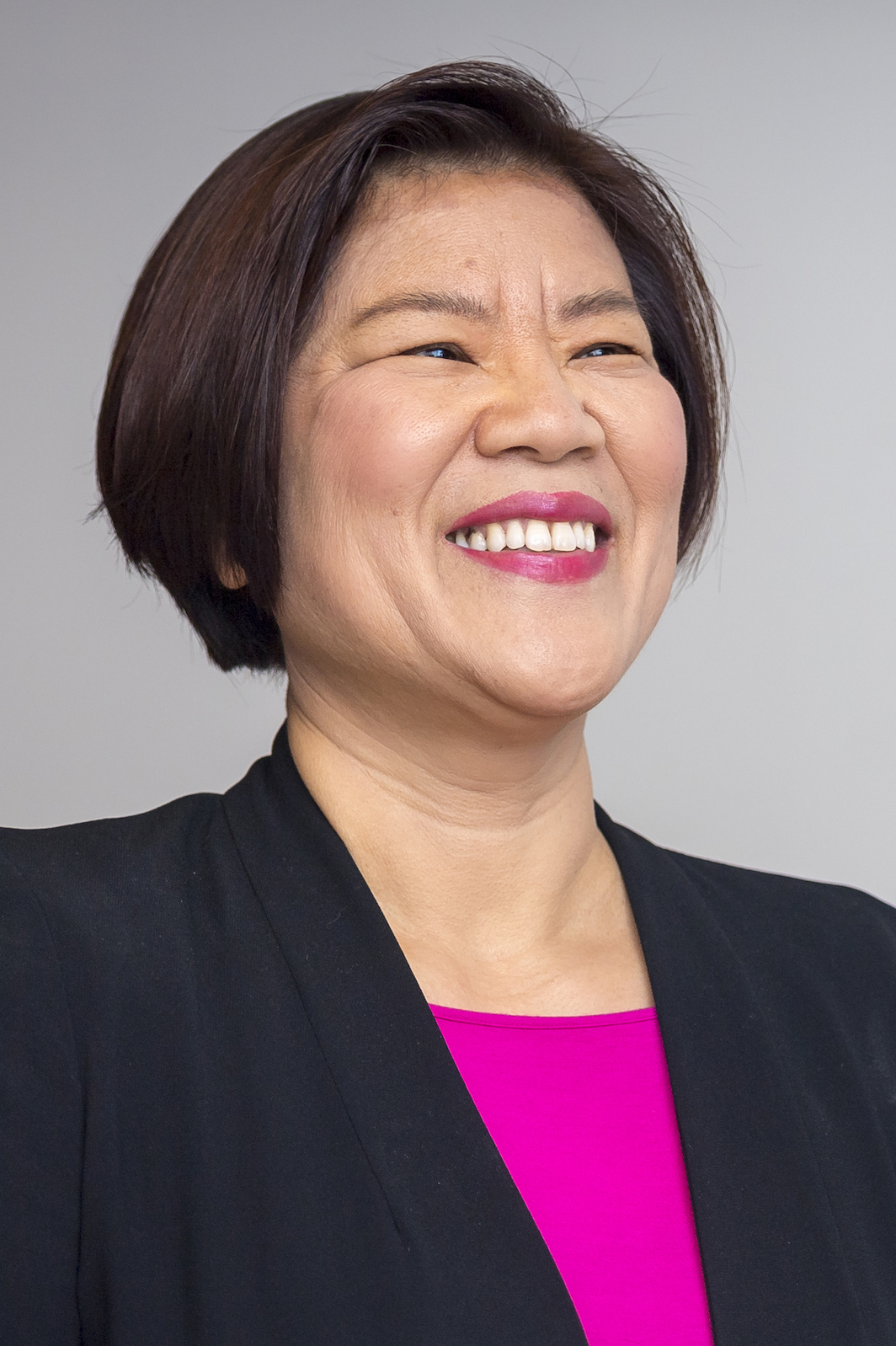
- Zhao in 2019
- Born: 1965 (age 60–61); Jinyun County, Zhejiang, China

Academic background
- Education: Beijing Broadcasting Institute; Simon Fraser University

Academic work
- Discipline: Sociologist
- Institutions: UCSD (1997-2000); Simon Fraser University (2000-present)
- Main interests: Communication and media studies, US-China relations

Yuezhi Zhao (趙月枝; born 1965) is a Canadian sociologist. She is a Canada Research Chair in Communication and Media Studies and the founder of the Global Media Monitoring Laboratory at Simon Fraser University (SFU). Her research takes an interdisciplinary approach to understanding U.S.-China relations, and she is a commentator on the policies pursued by the People's Republic of China.

== Early life and education ==
Zhao was born in China, in the Jinyun County of the Zhejiang Province. She completed BA in journalism from the Beijing Broadcasting Institute in 1984. In 1986, she migrated to Canada to pursue her post-graduate education at Simon Fraser University. There, she earned her MA in communication in 1989 and Ph.D. in communication in 1996.

== Career ==
After earning her PhD, Zhao earned a position at the University of California, San Diego in 1997. She left the University of California three years later and returned to SFU in 2000. She joined SFU as a tenure-tracked assistant professor in Communication and Media Studies.

As an associate professor of communications at SFU, Zhao was appointed a Tier 2 Canada Research Chair in the political economy of global communication in 2005. As a result of her research, she also earned the Chang-Jiang Scholar Award from the People's Republic of China, Ministry of Education in 2009. The next year, she was renewed as a Tier 2 Canada Research Chair and by 2011 was appointed to Tier 1 Canada Research Chair in the Political Economy of Global Communication.

While teaching at SFU, Zhao created the Global Communication Double MA Degree program, which would win the 2014 gold prize in the Educational Excellence Award category at the Canada-China Business Council's 4th Canada-China Business Excellence Awards.

In 2013, she received SFU's C. Edwin Baker Award for "the Advancement of Scholarship on Media, Markets and Democracy." She was also appointed a Senior Fellow at the Asia Pacific Foundation of Canada. Two years later, Zhao was the recipient of the 2015 Award for Leadership. That same year, she established The Heyang Rural Research Institute to study rural Chinese communities.

In 2019, Zhao was elected a Fellow of the Royal Society of Canada.

== Works ==
- Author: Communication and Society: Political Economic and Cultural Analysis (2014) Communication University of China Press, ISBN 978-7565702235
- Author: Communication in China: Political Economy, Power and Conflict (2008) Rowman & Littlefield Publishers, ISBN 978-0742519664
- Co-author: Global Communications: Toward a Transcultural Political Economy (2008) Rowman & Littlefield Publishers, ISBN 978-0742540446
- Author: Media, Market, and Democracy in China: Between the Party Line and the Bottom Line (1998) University of Illinois Press, ISBN 978-0252066788
