= Operation Yellowbird =

1989–1997 British Hong Kong–based operation

- Part of the aftermath of the 1989 Tiananmen Square protests and massacre
- Objective: Facilitate the escape of Chinese dissidents from mainland China to British Hong Kong
- Date: 4 June 1989 – 30 June 1997
- Executed by: MI6, CIA, The Alliance, triads

Operation Yellowbird
- Traditional Chinese: 黃雀行動
- Simplified Chinese: 黄雀行动
Transcriptions
Standard Mandarin
- Hanyu Pinyin: Huáng Què Xíngdòng
Yue: Cantonese
- Yale Romanization: Wòhng Jeuk Hàhngduhng
- Jyutping: Wong4 Zoek3 Hang4dung6

Operation Yellowbird (Chinese: 黃雀行動) or Operation Siskin was a British Hong Kong–based operation to help the Chinese dissidents who participated in the Tiananmen Square protests of 1989 to escape arrest by the Chinese government by facilitating their departure overseas via Hong Kong. Western intelligence agencies such as United Kingdom's MI6 and the United States Central Intelligence Agency (CIA) were involved in the operation. Other contributors included politicians, celebrities, business people and triad members from Hong Kong—forming the "unlikely" alliance which sustained the operation for most of its duration.

The operation began in late June 1989, following an order by the Beijing Municipal Public Security Bureau on 13 June 1989 to apprehend the leaders of the Beijing Students' Autonomous Federation who were on the run. The operation continued until 1997, which coincides with the year that British Hong Kong was handed over to China. Yellowbird successfully helped more than 400 dissidents, who were smuggled through Hong Kong, and then onwards to Western countries. Notable escapees include Wu'erkaixi, Chai Ling, Li Lu, Feng Congde, Chen Yizi, Su Xiaokang, and Arthur Liu, father of American figure skater Alysa Liu. Three Hong Kong–based activists were arrested by the Chinese authorities, but later released after the intervention of the Hong Kong government.

== Etymology ==
The operation obtained its name from the Chinese expression "The mantis stalks the cicada, unaware of the yellow bird behind" (螳螂捕蟬，黃雀在後). Its meaning is "to pursue a narrow gain while neglecting a greater danger".

Reverend Chu Yiu-Ming, a core member of the Hong Kong Alliance in Support of Patriotic Democratic Movements in China during 1989, also asserted that the name originated from the Haitian folk song "Yellow Bird". In an interview with South China Morning Post, he explained that the group "wanted the activists to fly freely in the sky, just like the yellow birds".

== Background ==
Days after the Chinese government suppressed the demonstrations, Beijing issued a wanted list of ringleaders of the protests. In response, activists in Hong Kong, including the Hong Kong Alliance in Support of Patriotic Democratic Movements in China, set up Operation Yellowbird in mid-June 1989 to help wanted activists escape from China. According to The Washington Post, after the Beijing protest crackdown, this group drew up an initial list of 40 dissidents they believed could form the nucleus of "a Chinese democracy movement in exile", with the help of the western intelligence agencies, and Asia's mafia, the Triads.

Some sources claim that the CIA maintained a network of informants among the student protesters and actively aided the student activists in forming their movement, however, Yellowbird operatives and James Lilley, the U.S. ambassador to China at the time, deny this.

== Financing ==
According to the posthumously published memoirs of veteran Hong Kong political figure and leader of the Alliance, Szeto Wah, Yellowbird was financed mainly by Hong Kong businessmen and celebrities who sympathised with the plight of the activists, but extensive assistance also came from the colonial government.

The organizers of the operation spent upwards of HK$600,000 (US$64,000) to rescue each activist and to cover other expenses to get them abroad. Amounts spent on the rescue would vary between HK$50,000 and $500,000 depending on the specific logistics, taking into account the political risks and number of attempts. More than HK$600,000 was spent and three attempts made before Wu'erkaixi managed to escape. In addition, triad members who managed the smuggling routes inside China requested payments of about US$25,000 for every attempt, regardless of its success or failure. Assistance from boat owners, who occasionally had triad connections, cost around HK$200,000 for the transportation of four to five passengers.

The operation was financed by Hong Kong businessmen, and a mobster, according to Newsweek; activists had initially collected $260,000 in donations from businessmen to fund the operation. One such businessman is Lo Hoi-sing, who was arrested during the operation. Other benefactors included chanteuse Anita Mui and filmmaker Alan Tang. According to Szeto, both lent significant financial and material support to help activists. Szeto said, "Tang had a lot of influence in Macau and got involved personally to save time but he remained low-key and never claimed his share of glory." Within China, considerable financial backing for the operation came from a variety of sources, such as business personalities and ordinary citizens who sympathized with the activists. Diplomats in Hong Kong were also able to help by obtaining visas for the escapees' departures to various countries. Funds were used for the costs of smuggling individuals directly out of mainland China, as well as for financial assistance for other dissidents who made it to Hong Kong by themselves.

Rescue money was mainly raised privately by the Operation, for fear of alerting British authorities at the time, who were being careful before Hong Kong's transfer to China in 1997. There were worries about possible repercussions from Beijing if any knowledge of assistance given to the dissidents was revealed. Nonetheless, Yellowbird managed to gather funds of around US$2,000,000 from the business community in its early beginnings.

== Success and details of the operation ==
Closely following the aftermath of the protests, 7 of the 21 most wanted students escaped China through the operation's assistance; although some had no knowledge of its existence at the time. These seven individuals were Wu’er Kaixi, Chai Ling, Feng Congde, Li Lu, Liang Qingtun, Wang Chaohua and Zhang Boli, while the remaining fourteen on the list had either turned themselves in or were subsequently captured. In its entirety, Yellowbird successfully helped more than 400 dissidents, who were smuggled through Hong Kong, and then onwards to Western countries. Some other escapees include Chen Yizi and Yan Jiaqi, senior government advisers to Zhao Ziyang at the time, along with the wanted intellectual, Su Xiaokang. In addition to pro-democracy activists, defected People's Liberation Army soldiers and police staff who provided aid to the operation were also rescued, some of whom carried weapons when they arrived in Hong Kong.

Escape teams from Hong Kong were sent into China under the cover of being specially formed trading companies. The rescue missions began with locating specific dissidents from the information and tips received by the Alliance about their whereabouts. Great care was taken to ensure the identities of the fugitives: code phrases or matching halves of a photograph allowed either party to recognize and trust the other. False documents and disguises were also used once the individuals were verified, with some teams enlisting make-up artists for this purpose. After locating the dissidents, groups had to quickly facilitate their transportation to Hong Kong. The cooperation of the triads gave the Alliance access to existing smuggling networks and extensive contacts. The collaborating groups agreed to provide free assistance for the operation but demanded that their associates on either side of the border be paid. Although the triads made certain connections possible, most of the smugglers involved in the rescue operations were not triad members themselves. Escapees generally reached Guangdong, through the help of sympathizers and escape teams who hid them in houses, factories and warehouses, where they were then taken to Hong Kong. The individuals were whisked away on speedboats late at night or stowed as ship cargo to avoid being caught. Smugglers relied on their contacts within the Chinese police and coast guards to ensure successful trips, while other customs and immigration officials were occasionally bribed to turn a blind eye. According to The Washington Post, the operation had contacts within "government departments, local public security bureaus, border troops, the coast guards, [and] even radar operators".

Four main routes were used to get dissidents from Guangdong to Hong Kong: Shekou to Tuen Mun's Castle Peak Power Station, Huidong to Chai Wan, Shanwei to Wong Chuk Hang and Nan'ao to Sai Kung. A fifth passage, Chung Ying Street in Sha Tau Kok, was also an option for escapees since one side belonged to Hong Kong and the other to mainland China. Once arriving in Hong Kong, dissidents would be hidden in different safe houses while preparations for their final departures were being made. Shelters such as Nai Chung camp in Sai Kung housed up to 30 activists at a time during its peak.

Newsweek maintains that these rescue squads made incursions into Chinese territory, while US and British intelligence operatives were involved in the extractions. However, former US Ambassador to China, James Lilley, said Americans were involved "almost exclusively in legal exfiltrations". There was cooperation from foreign embassies for the asylum-seekers. The CIA supplied materiel in the form of sophisticated equipment and other means of escape and subterfuge, and even weapons.

Chan Tat-Ching, or Brother Six, also helped with the operation as he had access to different speedboats and smugglers who specialized in moving goods between mainland China and Hong Kong. He was described as a mastermind of the operation. Chan and his partners created an 18-page plan for the dissidents' escape, encompassing various details such as routes, secret signals and contact points. His one rule for working with Yellowbird was that under no circumstance should he or his associates be known to the individuals they were rescuing. Szeto's memoirs detail how the operation was highly confidential and known to only six members of the Alliance. However, Chan, referred to by Szeto as only a logistician commander, allegedly compromised the operation by divulging escape routes to mainland officials after his brother was arrested, and was sacked by Szeto.

British authorities allowed the operation to continue, disregarding how dissidents entered the colony, so long as they left for another country quickly and quietly. Diplomats and officials worked at Kai Tak airport to secure departures that avoided usual bureaucratic channels, thus minimizing scrutiny from immigration officials and press for the fugitives. In an interview with Bloomberg, Alistair Asprey, former Secretary for Security in Hong Kong, said that officials met with staff of foreign consulates on different occasions to ask about accepting dissidents. Chu Yiu-ming, a core member of the Alliance, also sent letters to foreign governments requesting their approval of asylum applications. Some escapees were able to flee to the United States as well as to France, which was said to be the "most accommodating", according to Yellowbird organizers.

During the celebration of the 200th anniversary of the French Revolution, on Bastille Day (14 July 1989), several Chinese students exfiltrated by Operation Yellowbird watched the parade on the Avenue des Champs-Élysées (Paris), from the official seats of the People's Republic of China, since Chinese officials did not show up. Chinese students in France were at the start of the procession, surrounding a giant drum, their foreheads girded with white mourning cloth, bicycles in hand.

== Problems and end of the operation ==
Yellowbird encountered several complications throughout its duration. Different circumstances forced Chan Tat-Ching to withdraw from the operation, just after he had facilitated the retrieval of a total of 133 individuals. In an early instance, two of his men and an escaping student perished in a boat crash. On 13 October 1989, another two of his men were arrested after an attempt to rescue intellectuals Chen Ziming and Wang Juntao was revealed to be a sting operation. They had received false information about the two wanted intellectuals and were apprehended by Chinese police officers when they came to identify the men. Chan travelled to Beijing in 1990 and secured the release of his two operatives in exchange for terminating his involvement with any additional fugitives. Chan himself managed to 'negotiate' himself out of trouble with the PRC in 1991, having convinced certain official interlocutors that his intentions were patriotic. However, Chan was seriously injured after being attacked by unknown assailants in Hong Kong in 1996.

Three Hong Kong–based activists associated with the Operation were arrested by Chinese authorities on the mainland, but later released after intervention by Hong Kong's government. In 2002, Hong Kong democrat Leung Wah, who was also involved in the operation, died in mysterious circumstances in neighbouring Shenzhen. Although it was never proven one way or another, Leung's associates believe that he died at the hands of PRC security agents.

The operation proceeded until 1997, when Hong Kong's sovereignty was transferred to China. Some escapees had remained in the city for years, awaiting their withdrawal, which came when diplomatic efforts were frantically made in the months before the colony's return.
