= Edelweiss (play) =

2009 play

- Original title: 在廣場上放一朵小白花
- Original language: Cantonese
- Written by: Mandu (Note: stage name) (James Cheung); Lit Ming-wai
- Subject: June Fourth Incident
- Genre: Historical

Premiere
- Date: April 30, 2009

Edelweiss (Chinese: 在廣場上放一朵小白花) was a 2009 play produced by Stage 64, a theatre troupe formed by volunteers of the Hong Kong Alliance in Support of Patriotic Democratic Movements of China, to commemorate the 20th anniversary of the June Fourth Incident. Rather than simply retelling history, the play aimed to use stage art to evoke audience resonance and reflection, serving as a starting point for understanding June Fourth.

In its first year, the play received only a lukewarm response. However, when restaged in 2010, it was successfully reassembled and went on to earn widespread critical and box-office acclaim despite facing controversy after actors withdrew due to intimidation.

== Plot ==
The three main characters are based on real individuals:

- Ella, a Hong Kong journalist (inspired by Choi Suk-fong's Living Monument in the Square: June 4 Bloodshed through the Eyes of a Hong Kong Woman Reporter),
- a Beijing cadre's son, and
- a student from Sichuan.

Ella, a Hong Kong journalist, is sent to Beijing to cover the student movement in Tiananmen Square. Amid the political turmoil, she meets Ding Nan, a student from Beijing, and Xu Jun, a student from Sichuan. Together, they experience the clash between ideals and reality, forging a deep bond in the midst of passion and fear. Twenty years later, fate brings them together again in a changed world, forcing them to confront their memories and re-examine the convictions and choices of their youth.

== Production ==
Initially, the troupe considered commemorating June 4th through a poetry reading or concert. Inspired by members' personal creations, they ultimately decided to present the work as a stage play.

The stage design adopted a minimalist aesthetic, using lighting, projected imagery, and empty space to highlight the characters' inner transformations. Many details were drawn from real accounts—such as the harsh conditions in the square and the daily struggles of the protesters—adding authenticity to the historical setting.

The playwright deliberately reduced heavy-handed political commentary, focusing instead on the individuals to portray the ideals and contradictions of that moment in history. The production team also avoided demonizing the military, incorporating footage of Beijing citizens offering water to soldiers to remind audiences of the complex humanity present on all sides of the event.

Director Lee King-cheong expressed hope that one day Edelweiss could be performed in mainland China, allowing more people to confront historical truth directly. If given the chance, he said he would like to rewrite the ending into a "celebration after vindication," symbolizing reconciliation and the continuation of memory.

== Music ==
- 正義的小白花 lit. 'The Little White Flower of Justice ' —— The theme song, echoing the play's title, symbolizes purity and steadfast belief.
- Edelweiss —— Represents the spirit of holding onto one's convictions and resisting oppression under totalitarian rule.
- 當天的勇氣 lit. 'The Courage of That Day ' —— Reflects the continuation of the June Fourth spirit into the present, resonating with the will to resist found in Hong Kong's social movements.
- 媽媽我沒有做錯 lit. 'Mother, I did nothing wrong ' —— Expresses the protagonist's inner conflict between mother and homeland, emphasizing the tension and perseverance between ideals and familial affection.

== Political obstacles ==
=== Intimidation and threats ===
In March 2010, during a rehearsal, a backstage crew member received a threatening phone call warning that continuing to participate would harm their artistic career. Shortly afterward, all five backstage crew members withdrew, and two actors also decided to quit. The news caused a public uproar, and the theatre community quickly stepped in to fill the vacancies. After the media reported the incident, outraged Hong Kong audiences reacted strongly — all 1,500 tickets for the five performances of were sold out within a single day.

==== Censorship ====
The troupe had planned to display promotional posters in bus stop lightboxes, but Kowloon Motor Bus's advertising agent, JCDecaux Cityscape, refused the ads, citing "sensitive content" and concerns that the lightboxes might be vandalized.

==== Government funding and venue ====
In 2009, the group applied to the Leisure and Cultural Services Department for venue sponsorship last year but never received a reply.

== June 4th vigil ==
In 2021, facing the first Hong Kong's annual June 4th vigil under National Security Law, Lit Ming-wai thinks it is precisely the meaning of Stage 64's work, to commemorate the June Fourth Incident despite the circumstances. Unable to secure performance venues due to both political pressure and pandemic restrictions, the group turned to the internet and organized an online script reading instead of a live stage performance.
