= List of Hong Kong films of 2007 =

This article lists feature-length Hong Kong films released in 2007.

== Box office ==
The highest-grossing Hong Kong films released in 2007 by domestic box office gross revenue, are as follows:

Highest-grossing films released in 2007
| Rank | Title | Domestic gross |
|---|---|---|
| 1 | The Warlords | HK$27,919,869 |
| 2 | Protégé | HK$26,530,848 |
| 3 | Secret | HK$14,481,972 |
| 4 | Invisible Target | HK$13,232,308 |
| 5 | Love Is Not All Around | HK$12,190,605 |
| 6 | Brothers | HK$11.246.894 |
| 7 | Mad Detective | HK$11,092,832 |
| 8 | Simply Actors | HK$9,356,010 |
| 9 | Hooked on You | HK$9,288,355 |
| 10 | Flash Point | HK$9,016,184 |

== Releases ==
| Title | Director | Cast | Genre | Notes |
|---|---|---|---|---|
| Anna And Anna | Aubrey Lam | | | |
| Beauty And The 7 Beasts | Chung Shu Kai | | | |
| Blood Brothers | Alexi Tan | | | |
| Boarding Gate | Olivier Assayas | | | |
| Brothers | Derek Chiu | Miu Kiu Wai, Eason Chan, Andy Lau, Kent Tong, Felix Wong | | |
| Bullet & Brain | Keung Kwok Man | | | |
| Chacun son cinéma | Wong Kar-wai | | | |
| The Closet | Dick Cho | Francis Ng | | |
| Dancing Lion | Francis Ng, Marco Mak | Francis Ng, Anthony Wong, Teresa Mo, Lam Chi-chung, Lin Yuan, Hins Cheung | Comedy | |
| The Drummer | Kenneth Bi | Jaycee Chan, Tony Leung Ka-Fai, Angelica Lee, Yumiko Cheng | Drama | |
| Eye in the Sky | Yau Nai-Hoi | Simon Yam, Tony Leung Ka-Fai, Kate Tsui | | |
| Flash Point | Wilson Yip | Donnie Yen, Louis Koo | | |
| Gong Tau: An Oriental Black Magic | Herman Yau | Mark Cheng, Maggie Siu | | |
| Hooked on You | Law Wing-Cheong | Miriam Yeung, Eason Chan | | |
| Invisible Target | Benny Chan | Nicholas Tse, Jaycee Chan, Shawn Yue, Wu Jing | | |
| It's a Wonderful Life | Ronald Cheng | Ronald Cheng, Tony Leung Ka-fai, Teresa Mo, Vincent Kok, Louisa So, Alex Fong | Comedy | |
| Kidnap | Law Chi-Leung | | | |
| Kung Fu Mahjong 3: The Final Duel | Bosco Lam | Roger Kwok, Yuen Qiu, Yuen Wah, Shirley Yeung, Natalis Chan, Chan Hung Lit | Comedy | |
| Mad Detective | Johnnie To, Wai Ka-Fai | Lau Ching Wan, Andy On | | |
| Mr. Cinema | Samson Chiu | Anthony Wong, Ronald Cheng, Teresa Mo, Karen Mok | | |
| Protégé | Derek Yee | Andy Lau, Daniel Wu, Louis Koo, Anita Yuen, Zhang Jingchu | Action / Crime / Thriller | |
| The Pye-Eye Dog | Derek Kwok | Eason Chan, George Lam, Eric Tsang | Drama | |
| Triangle | Tsui Hark, Ringo Lam, Johnnie To | Louis Koo, Simon Yam, Sun Hong Lei | | Screened at the 2007 Cannes Film Festival |
| Twins Mission | Kong Tao-Hoi | Gillian Chung, Charlene Choi, Sammo Hung, Wu Jing, Yuen Wah | | |
| The Warlords | Peter Chan | Jet Li, Andy Lau, Takeshi Kaneshiro | Action / Drama | |
| Wu Ye Xiang Wen | Francis Nam | Wayne Lai, Law Lan | Ghost | |
