= Hong Kong Drama Award for Best Original Music (Musical) =

Annual theatrical award

Hong Kong Drama Award for Best Original Music (Musical) is presented by the Hong Kong Federation of Drama Societies at the Hong Kong Drama Awards ceremony, recognizing the most outstanding original musical composition created for a musical production of the year.

== Past winners ==
Year	Name	Title	Theatre company/production	Ref.
2019 (28th)	Peter Kam	The Only King II 唯獨袮是王II	The Only Stage	
2019 (28th)	Mike Orange and Alexander Fung	No Place Like Home 哈雷彗星的眼淚	Windmill Grass Theatre	
2019 (28th)	Cynthia Wong	Ladies, Bon Voyage! 祝你女途愉快	Hong Kong Repertory Theatre	
2020 (29th)	Veronica Lee	Always by Your Side 陪著你走	Hong Kong Arts Festival	
2020 (29th)	Ted Liao	Lo's Here 老子駕到	Actors' Family	
2020 (29th)	Jarita Wan	The Nightingale 夜鶯	The Only Stage	
2022 (30th)	Leon Ko	The Woman in Kenzo 穿Kenzo的女人	Chung Ying Theatre Company	
2022 (30th)	Cynthia Wong	Cinematic Memories on Train No. 5 路比和嫲嫲的鐵路5號	Actors' Family	
2022 (30th)	Stoa Lau Wing-tao	A Tale of the Southern Sky 一水南天	Hong Kong Dance Company and Actors' Family	
2023 (31st)	Leon Ko	The Impossible Trial 大狀王	Hong Kong Repertory Theatre and West Kowloon Cultural District	
2023 (31st)	Amos Wong and Stoa Lau Wing-tao	Grave of the Fireflies 再見螢火蟲	Theatre Space	
2023 (31st)	Peco Chui	Love at First Snow 今年初雪，把失雪完結！	Class 7A Drama Group	
2024 (32nd)	Ng Cheuk-yin	Om Encounter 庵藏不露	Yat Po Singers	
2024 (32nd)	John Laudon	Africian Lion @ Chungking Mansions 重慶大廈的非洲雄獅	Theatre Space	
2024 (32nd)	Anna Lo	The Retransforman 筋肉太變態	Actors' Family	
2025 (33rd)	Chan Hing-to	Draft My Life 移家女孩	We Draman Group	
2025 (33rd)	Ek Wong	A Tale of the Young Shennong 少年神農的搖滾獨白	Musical Trio	
2025 (33rd)	Ek Wong	Toasty's Graffiti Singing Adventure 多士妹唱遊Graffiti	Jumbo Kids Theatre	
