= Hong Kong Drama Award for Best Original Music (Drama) =

Annual theatrical award

Hong Kong Drama Award for Best Original Music (Drama) is presented by the Hong Kong Federation of Drama Societies at the Hong Kong Drama Awards ceremony, recognizing the most outstanding original musical composition created for a drama production of the year.

The award was initially established as Best Original Score (最佳創作音樂) in 1992. It was later briefly renamed to Best Original Music (Drama) in 2011, before changing to Best Original Score (最佳配樂) the following year. Eventually in 2019, it was reverted to Best Original Music (Drama) and remaining to this date.

== Past winners ==
=== 1992 - 2010: Best Original Score ===
Year	Name	Title	Theatre company/production	Ref.
1992 (1st)	Hugh Trethowan	Antigone 禁葬令	Hong Kong Repertory Theatre	
1992 (1st)	Wong Sun-keung	Far Way Home 客鄉途情遠	Chung Ying Theatre Company	
1992 (1st)	Billy Wong Hon-kei	肥豬仔走天涯 lit. 'Fei chu jai travels the world '	Hong Kong Repertory Theatre	
1993 (2nd)	Lai Cho-tin	A Foxy Tale 聊齋新誌	Wan Chai Theatre	
1993 (2nd)	Chung Chi-wing	I Have a Date with Spring 我和春天有個約會	Hong Kong Repertory Theatre	
1993 (2nd)	Christopher Loak and 舒雅 (Note: unable to translate)	飛躍紅船 lit. 'The Soaring Red Boat '	Wan Chai Theatre	
1994 (3rd)	Chung Chi-wing	1941 girl 遇上1941的女孩	Actors' Family	
1994 (3rd)	Lee Wing-wing	12th Night	Hong Kong Academy for Performing Arts	
1995 (4th)	Eric Pun Kwong-pui	Children of the Wind 風中細路	The Musical Company	
1995 (4th)	Chan Ning-chi	Tales of the Walled City 城寨風情	Hong Kong Repertory Theatre	
1995 (4th)	Roger Lin Lung-Ghi	Johnny Got His Guns 情危生命線	旭日坊劇團 lit. 'Rising Sun Theatre Company '	
1996 (5th)	Ada To	Forever Yours 人生唯願多知己	Chung Ying Theatre Company	
1996 (5th)	Roger Lin Lung-Ghi	Entering Miss Julie 元洲街茱莉小姐的最後一夜 (Note: lit. 'Miss Julie's Last Night on Yuen Chau Street ')	Theatre Resolu	
1996 (5th)	Frankie Ho	The End of the Long River 長河之末	Hong Kong Academy for Performing Arts	
1997 (6th)	Frankie Ho	The Dream of a Young Girl 少女夢	Hong Kong Academy for Performing Arts	
1997 (6th)	Frankie Ho	Forever Miss To; Miss杜十娘	Hong Kong Repertory Theatre	
1997 (6th)	Frankie Ho	三條天天向上的根 lit. 'Three ever-growing roots '	Exploration Theatre	
1997 (6th)	Roger Lin Lung-Ghi	Miss Julie Doesn't Live Here Anymore 元洲街茱莉小姐不再在這裡	Theatre Fanatical	
1997 (6th)	Ada To	Snow White 白雪公主	High Noon Production Company Limited	
1998 (7th)	Peter Suart	快感生活 lit. 'Pleasurable Life'		
1998 (7th)	Roger Lin Lung-Ghi	The girl who turned the world upside down 跟住個𡃁妹氹氹轉	毛俊輝實驗創作 lit. 'Mao Chun Fai's Experimental Works'	
1998 (7th)	Matthew Ma Wing-ling	Before the Rain Stops 瘋雨狂居 (Note: lit. 'Mad Rain, Wild Home ')	Hong Kong Repertory Theatre	
1999 (8th)	Leung Hon-wai and Matthew Ma Wing-ling	The First Emperor's Last Days 始皇最後的日子	Chung Ying Theatre Company	
1999 (8th)	Wong Sun-keung	The Bureaucrats 官場現形記	Chung Ying Theatre Company	
1999 (8th)	Raymond To	Butterfly Lovers 梁祝	The Spring-Time Group	
1999 (8th)	Peter Suart	Up he climbs, Down she crawls 狷窿狷罅擒高擒低	Actors' Family	
2000 (9th)	Frankie Ho	City Legend 城市傳奇	City University of Hong Kong	
2000 (9th)	Yu Yat-yiu	Dummy Mommy, without a Baby 玉女添丁	The Spring-Time Group	
2000 (9th)	Tony Kiang	Ricky my Love 歷奇	Hong Kong Repertory Theatre	
2001 (10th)	Chung Chi-wing	Red 紅	諾士娛樂製作 (Note: unable to translate)	
2001 (10th)	Roger Lin Lung-Ghi	To Kill or To Be Killed 螳螂捕蟬	Prospects Theatre	
2001 (10th)	Anthony Lun Wing-leung	Red Boat 煙雨紅船 lit. 'Red Boat in the Mist and Rain '	Emperor Entertainment Group	
2001 (10th)	Jacky Chan Kwok-leung	Medea 美狄亞	James Mark Production	
2001 (10th)	Hugh Trethowan	Manimal Farm 動物農莊攪攪震	Theatre Ensemble	
2002 (11th)	Chung Chi-wing	The Border Town 邊城	Actors' Family	
2002 (11th)	Matthew Ma Wing-ling	What a Blissful Encounter, Mr. Ts'ai! 幸遇先生蔡	Chung Ying Theatre Company	
2002 (11th)	Hugh Trethowan	The Blue Bird 墮落鳥	Theatre Ensemble	
2002 (11th)	Kung Chi-shing	O Alquimista 煉金術士	Chung Ying Theatre Company and No Man's Land (Note: now Tang Shu-wing Theatre Studio)	
2003 (12th)	Anthony Lun Wing-leung	Secret of Resurrection 還魂香	Hong Kong Repertory Theatre	
2003 (12th)	Chung Chi-wing	Love in a Fallen City 新傾城之戀	Hong Kong Repertory Theatre	
2003 (12th)	Roger Lin Lung-Ghi	K City; K城	Actors' Family	
2004 (13th)	Leon Ko	The Good Person of Szechwan 四川好人	Actors' Family	
2004 (13th)	John Chen Kwok-ping	The Good Person of Szechwan 四川好人	Actors' Family	
2004 (13th)	Frankie Ho	Departure 00:00	Hong Kong Repertory Theatre	
2005 (14th)	Law Wing-fai	Peach Blossom Fan 桃花扇	Hong Kong Repertory Theatre	
2005 (14th)	Stoa Lau Wing-tao	DA 老竇 (Note: lit. 'Dad ')	Theatre Space	
2005 (14th)	Roger Lin Lung-Ghi	虎鶴雙形 lit. 'Tiger Crane Paired Form '	Theatre Ensemble and Prospects Theatre	
2006 (15th)	Frankie Ho	Vagabond 流浪在彩色街頭	Drama Gallery	
2006 (15th)	Chan Wing-wah	Zheng He and The Emperor 鄭和與成祖	Hong Kong Repertory Theatre	
2006 (15th)	Chung Chi-wing	February 14; 2月14	Hong Kong Repertory Theatre	
2007 (16th)	Leon Ko	Legend of the White Snake 白蛇新傳	Actors' Family	
2007 (16th)	Michael Tsang	Empty	W Theatre	
2008 (17th)	Chet Lam	Once in a Lifetime 一期一會	W Theatre	
2008 (17th)	Stoa Lau Wing-tao	P.E. Period 體育時期-青春‧歌‧劇	Class 7A Drama Group	
2008 (17th)	Chan Wai-fat	Defiance 焚城令	Theatre Horizon	
2008 (17th)	Roger Lin Lung-Ghi	The Dream of Red Chamber 紅樓夢	Roger Lin Studio	
2008 (17th)	Kung Chi-shing	Dust and Dawn 我自在江湖	Hong Kong Repertory Theatre	
2008 (17th)	Frankie Ho	Homo Superus 異型金剛	2 On Stage	
2008 (17th)	Stoa Lau Wing-tao	Oscar et la dame Rose 粉紅天使	Theatre Space	
2009 (18th)	Anthony Lun Wing-leung	Snow Queen 雪后	Actors' Theatre	
2009 (18th)	Leon Ko	Field of Dreams 頂頭鎚	Hong Kong Repertory Theatre	
2009 (18th)	Chung Chi-wing and Ben Cheung Siu-hung	Family Protection Unit 家庭保衛隊	Hong Kong Repertory Theatre	
2010 (19th)	Yu Yat-yiu	Black Swan 黑天鵝	Hong Kong Arts Festival	
2010 (19th)	Leon Ko	The Passage Beyond 一屋寶貝	Actors' Family	
2010 (19th)	Chen Ning-chi	Boundless Movement 遍地芳菲	Hong Kong Repertory Theatre	

=== 2011: Best Original Music (Drama) ===
Year	Name	Title	Theatre company/production	Ref.
2011 (20th)	Frankie Ho	Frankenstein 科學怪人	Chung Ying Theatre Company and Hong Kong Academy for Performing Arts	
2011 (20th)	Frankie Ho	Animal Farm 動物農莊	Theatre Noir	
2011 (20th)	Ivana Wong	Octave 柯廸夫	W Theatre	
2011 (20th)	Peter Kam and Henry Fong	The Only King 2 唯獨祢是王2010	The Stage Only	

=== 2012 - 2018: Best Original Score ===
Year	Name	Title	Theatre company/production	Ref.
2012 (21st)	Chan Wai-fat	Shed Skin 脫皮爸爸	Hong Kong Repertory Theatre	
2012 (21st)	Frankie Ho	Reverie on an Empire 一年皇帝夢	Hong Kong Repertory Theatre	
2012 (21st)	Kung Chi-shing	The Heydays 盛勢	Hong Kong Repertory Theatre	
2013 (22nd)	Frankie Ho and Chester Wong	The Notebook 惡童日記	The Nonsensemakers	
2013 (22nd)	Frankie Ho and Chester Wong	SEVEN: Lost and Lust; SEVEN: 慾望迷室	Class 7A Drama Group	
2013 (22nd)	Chan Wai-fat	The Wild Boar 野豬	Hong Kong Arts Festival	
2013 (22nd)	Stoa Lau Wing-tao	Twelve Angry Men 十二怒漢	Theatre Space	
2013 (22nd)	Stoa Lau Wing-tao	The Message 風聲	Theatre Space	
2014 (23rd)	Edgar Hung	The 39 Steps 搏命兩頭騰	Chung Ying Theatre Company	
2014 (23rd)	Sze Ka-yan	Der goldene Drache 金龍	On&On Theatre Workshop	
2014 (23rd)	Poon Wai-sum	The Emperor, his Mom, a Eunuch and a Man 都是龍袍惹的禍	Hong Kong Repertory Theatre	
2015 (24th)	Chan Wai-fat	Attempts on her Life 安‧非她命	Hong Kong Repertory Theatre	
2016 (25th)	Frankie Ho	The Government Inspector 戇大人	Chung Ying Theatre Company	
2016 (25th)	Martin Lai	The Revenge of Local Heroes 復仇者傳聞之驚天諜變反擊戰	Chung Ying Theatre Company	
2017 (26th)	Chan Wai-fat	Hu Xueyan, my Dear 親愛的，胡雪巖	Hong Kong Repertory Theatre	
2017 (26th)	Frankie Ho	The Third Lie 第三謊言	The Nonsensemakers	
2017 (26th)	Leong Wai-ngok	Macbeth 馬克白	Tang Shu-wing Theatre Studio	
2017 (26th)	Edgar Hung	Nunsense A-men! 巴打修女騷一SHOW!	Chung Ying Theatre Company	
2018 (27th)	Leon Ko	Sing Out 奮青樂與路 (Note: lit. 'The path of joyful and striving youth')	Delia Memorial School (Hip Wo), Pui Ching Middle School, HHCKLA Buddhist Ching Kok Secondary School and Ebenezer School & Home for the Visually Impaired	
2018 (27th)	Brian Ting Chung-wai	Peer Gynt 培爾‧金特	Theatre Horizon	
2018 (27th)	Chan Wai-fat	The Diary of Song 武松日記	Hong Kong Repertory Theatre	
2018 (27th)	Lo Hau-man	Three Kingdoms 三國	Hong Kong Theatre Works	

=== 2019 to present: Best Original Music (Drama) ===
Year	Name	Title	Theatre company/production	Ref.
2019 (28th)	Lam Kwan-fai, Julian Chan and Li Cheuk-yin	The Ravages of Time: Heros 火鳳燎原之亂世英雄	Actors' Square	
2019 (28th)	Labroe Lee	Rashomon 羅生門	Chung Ying Theatre Company	
2019 (28th)	On Chan and Lai Ying Tong	The Miracles of the Namiya General Store 解憂雜貨店	Chung Ying Theatre Company	
2020 (29th)	Stoa Lau Wing-tao, Hui Lok and Mak Ka-lun	Uragiri Gomen! 坂本龍馬の背叛！	Theatre Space	
2020 (29th)	Ng Cheuk-yin	Love Death and Everything In-between 三生三世愛情餘味	Yat Po Singers	
2020 (29th)	Ng Cheuk-yin	This Victoria Has No Secrets 維多利雅講	Yat Po Singers	
2022 (30th)	Wong Hin-yan	A Winter Funeral 玩轉婚前身後事	Hong Kong Repertory Theatre	
2022 (30th)	#1314 Music Production Team	#1314	Théâtre De La Feuille	
2022 (30th)	Keith Leung (Note: stage name GayBird)	The Lost Adults 小飛俠	Théâtre De La Feuille	
2022 (30th)	Anna Lo	In the Mood for Red 紅絲絨	Theatre Ronin	
2023 (31st)	Frankie Ho	We are gay 我們最快樂	Hong Kong Arts Festival	
2023 (31st)	Keith Leung (Note: stage name GayBird)	HACK	GayBird × Ata Wong	
2023 (31st)	Chan Wai-fat	Love à la Zen 愛情觀自在	Hong Kong Repertory Theatre	
2024 (32nd)	Chester Wong	The Isle 小島．餘香	Hong Kong Repertory Theatre	
2024 (32nd)	Chan Wai-fat and Le Petit Soldat	Show Me Your Love 愛我別走	SUCH HK	
2024 (32nd)	Yankov Wong	The Sympathetic Detonation 殉爆	Class 7A Drama Group	
2025 (33rd)	Sin Lok-yan, Cheung Cheuk-hang and Ivor Houlker	Songs of Innocence and Experience 天真與世故之歌	West Kowloon Cultural District and Rooftop Productions	
2025 (33rd)	FUNG King-kong	After Life 下一站，天國	Hong Kong Repertory Theatre	
2025 (33rd)	Ceciia Lau Yee-lee, Terrence Leung, Allison Fong and Ian Tang	Le Fleurs du Mal 惡之華	Artocrite Theatre	
2026 (34th)	Chan Wai-fat	The Tamed and the Tempted 塘西馴悍記	Hong Kong Repertory Theatre	
2026 (34th)	Lam Kwan-fai	The Story of K City; K城故事	Hong Kong Repertory Theatre	
2026 (34th)	Lam Kwan-fai	Bhagavad Gita 薄伽梵歌2025	Tang Shu-wing Theatre Studio	
2026 (34th)	Wong Hin-yan	Flowing Warbler 2.0 月明星稀2.0	On & On Theatre Workshop	
