= 27th Hong Kong Film Awards =

2008 Hong Kong Film Awards

- Date: 14 April 2008
- Site: Hong Kong Cultural Centre
- Hosted by: Carol Cheng; Sandra Ng; Sammi Cheng

The 27th Hong Kong Film Awards ceremony was held on 14 April 2008 in the Hong Kong Cultural Centre and hosted by Carol Cheng, Sandra Ng and Sammi Cheng. Winners in nineteen categories were unveiled, with the film The Warlords being the year's biggest winner.

The nominees were announced on 2 February 2008. Over a hundred nominees contested for seventeen categories of awards. The front runners were Protégé and The Warlords, with thirteen and twelve nominations respectively.

== Awards ==
Winners are listed first, highlighted in boldface, and indicated with a double dagger (‡).

**Best Film**: **The Warlords**‡; Eye In The Sky; Mad Detective; Protégé; The Postmodern Life of My Aunt	**Best Director**: **Peter Chan — The Warlords**‡; Derek Yee — Protégé; Ann Hui — The Postmodern Life of My Aunt; Johnnie To and Wai Ka-Fai — Mad Detective; Yau Nai-Hoi — Eye In The Sky
**Best Screenplay**: **Wai Ka-Fai and Au Kin-Yee — Mad Detective**‡; Derek Yee Tung Sing, Chun Tin-Nam, Loong Man-Hong & Go Sun — Protégé; Xu Lan, Chun Tin Nam, Aubrey Lam, Huang Jianxin, Jojo Hui, Ho Kei Ping, Guo Jun Li, James Yuen Sai Sang — The Warlords; Li Qiang — The Postmodern Life of My Aunt; Yau Nai-Hoi & Au Kin-Yee — Eye in the Sky	**Best Actor**: **Jet Li — The Warlords**‡; Aaron Kwok — The Detective; Andy Lau — The Warlords; Simon Yam — Eye in the Sky; Sean Lau — Mad Detective
**Best Actress**: **Siqin Gaowa — The Postmodern Life of My Aunt**‡; Teresa Mo — Mr. Cinema; Zhang Jing Chu — Protégé; Rene Liu — Kidnap; Charlene Choi — Simply Actors	**Best Supporting Actor**: **Andy Lau — Protégé**‡; Nick Cheung — Exodus; Ronald Cheng — Mr. Cinema; Louis Koo — Protégé; Chow Yun-fat — The Postmodern Life of My Aunt
**Best Supporting Actress**: **Susan Shaw — The Pye-Dog**‡; Karen Mok — Mr. Cinema; Anita Yuen — Protégé; Zhao Wei — The Postmodern Life of My Aunt; Maggie Shiu — Eye in the Sky	**Best New Performer**: **Kate Tsui — Eye in the Sky**‡; Linda Chung — Love Is Not All Around; Tsei Tze-Tung — Protégé; Wen Jun-Hui — The Pye-Dog; Wong Hau-Yun — Besieged City
**Best Cinematography**: **Arthur Wong — The Warlords**‡; Charlie Lam — Exodus; Venus Keung — Protégé; Kwan Pun Leung and Yu Lik-wai — The Postmodern Life of My Aunt; Cheng Siu-Keung — Mad Detective	**Best Film Editing**: **Eric Kong — Protégé**‡; Oxide Pang and Curran Pang — The Detective; Wenders Li — The Warlords; Tina Baz — Mad Detective; David Richardson — Eye in the Sky
**Best Art Direction**: **Kenneth Yee, Yi Zheng-Zhou and Pater Wong** **— The Warlords**‡; Anuson Pinyopotjanee — The Detective; Alfred Yau — Blood Brothers; Kenneth Yee and Kenneth Mak — Protégé; Yank Wong — Besieged City	**Best Costume Make Up Design**: **Kenneth Yee, Jessie Dai and Lee Pik-Kwan** **— The Warlords**‡; Surasak Warakitcharoen — The Detective; Tim Yip — Blood Brothers; Ma Yu-Tao — The Postmodern Life of My Aunt; Stanley Cheung — Mad Detective
**Best Action Choreography**: **Donnie Yen — Flash Point**‡; Kong Tao-Hoi — Twins Mission; Ching Siu-tung — The Warlords; Lee Chung-Chi — Invisible Target; Chin Ka-lok — Protégé	**Best Original Film Score**: **Joe Hisaishi — The Postmodern Life of My Aunt**‡; Payont Permsith and Jadet Chawang — The Detective; Comfort Chan, Peter Kam, Chatchai Pongprapaphan and Leon Ko — The Warlords; Peter Kam — Protégé; Andre Matthias — The Drummer
**Best Original Film Song**: **逼得太緊 — Love Is Not All Around**‡; Composer: Dennie Wong; Lyricist: Albert Leung; Singer: Kary Ng; 兄弟 — Brothers; Composer: Eason Chan; Lyricist: Andy Lau; Singer: Andy Lau and Eason Chan; 星光伴我心 — Mr. Cinema; Composer: Peter Kam; Lyricist: Keith Chan; Singer: Ronald Cheng; 流浪者之歌 (Happy Wanderer) — MingMing; Composer: Anthony Wong and Jason Choi; Lyricist: Albert Leung; Singer: Anthony Wong and Zhou Xun; 問天不應 — The Pye-Dog; Composer: George Lam; Lyricist: Calvin Poon; Singer: George Lam	**Best Sound Design**: **Sunit Asvinikul and Nakorn Kositpaisal — The Warlords**‡; Wachira Wongsaroj — The Detective; Kinson Tsang — Protégé; Steve Burgess and Sam Wong — Flash Point; Tu Duu-Chih and Kuo Li-Chi — The Drummer
**Best Visual Effects**: **Ng Yuen-Fai, Chas Chau and Tracy Kok — The Warlords**‡; Suchada Somasavachai — The Detective; Ho Siu-Lun, Chow Kim-Hung and Ching Han-Wong — Protégé; Raymond Man — Mad Detective; Leung Wai-Kit, Don Ma, Leung Yiu-Fung and Frankie Chung — The Magic Gourd	**Best New Director**: **Yau Nai-Hoi — Eye in the Sky**‡; Derek Kwok — The Pye-Dog; Adam Wong — Magic Boy
**Best Asian Film**: **Lust, Caution (Taiwan/China/USA)**‡; Secret (Taiwan); The Sun Also Rises (China); Tokyo Tower: Mom and Me, and Sometimes Dad (Japan); Getting Home (China)	**Lifetime Achievement**: **Raymond Chow**‡
**Professional Achievement**: **Lydia Shum**‡
