= Hong Kong Drama Award for Best Actress in Musical =

Annual theatrical award

Hong Kong Drama Award for Best Actress in Musical is presented by the Hong Kong Federation of Drama Societies at the Hong Kong Drama Awards ceremony, recognizing the most outstanding performance by an actress in a musical production of the year.

== Past winners ==
Year	Name	Title	Theatre company/production	Ref.
2025 (33rd)	Cheung Ka-ying	Toasty's Graffiti Singing Adventure 多士妹唱遊Graffiti	Jumbo Kids Theatre	
2025 (33rd)	Bubbles Man Hoi-lam	Little Shop of Horrors 花樣獠牙	Chung Ying Theatre Company	
2025 (33rd)	Wong Hei-tung	Draft My Life 移家女孩	We Draman Group	
2025 (33rd)	Mida Pang	Elevator of Memories 回憶升降機	XTRAMENTAL	
2025 (33rd)	Cheung Ngar-lai	LI(N)ES 跣	Arts' Options	
2025 (33rd)	Chloe Wong Po-yin	The Mad Ones 狂花駕駛課程	Musical Trio	
