= Hong Kong Drama Award for Best Production =

Annual theatrical award

The Hong Kong Drama Award for Best Production is presented by the Hong Kong Federation of Drama Societies at the Hong Kong Drama Awards ceremony, recognizing the most outstanding stage production of the year.

== Past winners ==
Year	Producer	Title	Theatre company/production	Ref.
2018 (27th)	Nick Ho	Sing Out 奮青樂與路 (Note: lit. 'The path of joyful and striving youth')	Delia Memorial School (Hip Wo), Pui Ching Middle School, HHCKLA Buddhist Ching Kok Secondary School, Ebenezer School & Home for the Visually Impaired	
2018 (27th)	Marble Leung	Le Père 父親 (Note: lit. 'The father')	Hong Kong Repertory Theatre	
2018 (27th)	Cheung Chi-wai	The Truth 謊言 (Note: lit. 'The Lie')	Project Roundabout	
2019 (28th)	Edmond Tong	No News is True News 新聞小花的告白 (Note: lit. 'Confession of a News Starlet')	Windmill Grass Theatre	
2019 (28th)	Marble Leung	Auspicious Day 好日子	Hong Kong Repertory Theatre	
2019 (28th)	Christy Lee Shuk-kwan	Rashomon 羅生門	Chung Ying Theatre Company	
2020 (29th)	Lit Ming-wai, Cheung Ka-wan, Gladys Wong Yee-mun	May 35th 5月35日	Stage 64	
2020 (29th)	Sunnie Lai	A Dream Like a Dream 如夢之夢	Hong Kong Repertory Theatre	
2020 (29th)	Marble Leung and Yvonne Pang	La Cage aux Folles 假鳳虛鸞 (Note: lit. 'A fake phoenix and an empty luan'. Phoenix and luan are both mystical birds.)	Hong Kong Repertory Theatre	
2022 (30th)	Edmond Tong	No News is True News 2 新聞小花的告白2 (Note: lit. 'Confession of a News Starlet 2')	Windmill Grass Theatre	
2022 (30th)	Candy Cheung and Mandy Yiu Yun-man	A Tale of the Southern Sky 一水南天	Hong Kong Dance Company and Actors' Family	
2022 (30th)	Christy Lee Shuk-kwan	The Woman in Kenzo 穿Kenzo的女人	Chung Ying Theatre Company	
2023 (31st)	Bobo Lee and Yvonne Pang	The Impossible Trial 大狀王	Hong Kong Repertory Theatre and West Kowloon Cultural District	
2023 (31st)	Hong Kong Arts Festival	We are gay 我們最快樂	Hong Kong Arts Festival	
2023 (31st)	Alex Fung	One Last Gift 最後禮物	Emperor Entertainment Group	
2024 (32nd)	Sunnie Lai	Scapin in Jiānghú, Chap. 2023 史家本第二零二三回之伏虎降龍	Hong Kong Repertory Theatre	
2024 (32nd)	Gladys Wong Yee-mun	The Cost of Living 我們所不知道的生活成本	Hong Kong Federation of Drama Societies	
2024 (32nd)	Raymond Wan and Tam Tsang Kwong-ngan	I am Tree 植物人	Artocrite Theatre	
2025 (33rd)	Edmond Tong	Di-Dar	Windmill Grass Theatre	
2025 (33rd)	Hong Kong Academy for Performing Arts School of Drama	A Journey of Sanshiro 三四郎	Hong Kong Academy for Performing Arts School of Drama	
2025 (33rd)	Bobo Lee and Michelle Li Yuen-jing	Songs of Innocence and Experience 天真與世故之歌	West Kowloon Cultural District and Rooftop Productions	
2026 (34th)	Miu Law	In a Perfect World 完美的世界	On & On Theatre Workshop	
2026 (34th)	Hong Kong Academy for Performing Arts	What the Buddha Said 我佛無著經	Hong Kong Academy for Performing Arts	
2026 (34th)	Christy Lee Shuk Kwan	The Play That Goes Wrong 你個戲壞咗呀！	Chung Ying Theatre Company	
