= Golden Chicken 2 =

2003 Hong Kong film by Samson Chiu

- Film poster
- 金雞2
- Directed by: Samson Chiu
- Written by: Mark Cheung; Lam Oi Wah; James Yuen
- Produced by: Peter Chan; Hui Yuet-Jan; Eric Tsang
- Starring: Sandra Ng
- Cinematography: Keung Kwok-Man
- Edited by: Cheung Ka-Fai
- Music by: Peter Kam; Joseph Wong
- Production company: Applause Pictures
- Distributed by: Go Film Distribution
- Release date: 24 December 2003 (Hong Kong)
- Running time: 104 minutes
- Country: Hong Kong
- Language: Cantonese

Golden Chicken 2 (金雞2 gam1 gai1) is a 2003 Hong Kong film directed by Samson Chiu. It is a sequel to the 2002 film Golden Chicken.

== Cast and roles ==
- Sandra Ng – Kam
- Bing – Granny B in the queue
- Cha Man-Wet – Mainland businessman A
- Chan Chi-Shuen – Teddy boy A
- Erica Chan – Mahjong player D
- Chan Lai-Fun – Mother-in-law's relative
- Chan Ming-Yam – Building watchman
- Chan Wai-Ling – Friend D at temple
- Ronald Cheng
- Dicky Cheung – Water man
- Jacky Cheung – Quincy
- Cheung Kin-Hung – CCB investigator A
- Sabrina Cheung – Northern hooker B
- Kenny Chin – Customer in appliance store
- Choi Tat-Wah – Happy Corner worker C
- Chui Hin-Fung – CCB investigator B
- Alva Chun – Northern hooker A
- Wancy Dai – 7-Eleven shopkeeper
- Fung Ka-Ying – Nightclub hostess B
- Ho Ka-Kou – Nightclub guest A
- Nichole Hor – Mahjong player B
- Ho Yat-Wa – Future cop B
- Hua Tau – Teddy boy B
- Carlos Koo – Male jogger
- Silver Kwok – Mahjong player C
- Leon Lai – Doctor Chow Man Kwong
- Lai Li-Li – Female jogger
- Rita Lai – Madam A's best maid
- Lam Lai-Kuen – 7-Eleven customer D
- Lam Si-Wing – Registrar assistant
- Andy Lau – chief executive in year 2046
- Lau Kuen – Mainland businessman B
- Lau Kwun-Hung – Temple worker B
- Lau Man-Ting – Woman D in the queue
- Lau Yo-Ha – Woman in house
- Lau Yu-Hai – Granny A in the queue
- Law Dong-Mei – Woman A in the queue
- Angelica Lee
- Lee Ka-Sin – Nightclub hostess A
- Lee Ka-Wing – Happy Corner worker A
- Leung Ho-Ming – Pervert at temple
- Leung Wai-Ching – Woman C in the queue
- Leung Wai-Yan – Fishball girl C
- Leung Yau-Sen – Old man in the queue
- Ling Ling-Chui – Friend C at temple
- Michelle Lo – Mahjong player A
- Lui Chui-Tsang – Madam A's mother-in-law
- Fiona Lui – Frightened female customer
- Lui Ho-Kwong – Noodle Stall worker B
- Lum Chun-Ka – Massage parlour manager
- May – Filipino maid
- Ming Ng – Dog owner
- Mok King-Wah – Nightclub guest B
- Kenneth Ng – Kum's father
- Vincent Ng – Noodle stall worker A
- Ivy Pang – Friend A at temple
- Samdasani Rajesh – Indian client
- Nicky Shih – Happy Corner worker B
- Sin She-Kin – 7-Eleven Customer B
- Siu Hung – Temple worker A
- Sum Wai-Leung – Mainland China police B
- Tam Yuen-Si – Woman B in the queue
- Tang Hon-Tai – Future cop A
- Pat Tang – Woman E in the queue
- Lawrence Tan
- Kristal Tin
- Chapman To – Club owner
- Tsang Kit-Hing – Happy Corner cleaning maid
- Tsang Lap-Hung – Happy Corner worker D
- Anthony Wong Chau-sang – Chow
- Wong Chiu-Wa – Frightened male customer
- Felix Wong
- May Wong – Friend B at temple
- Wong Tsz-Kwan – Fishball girl B
- Wu Yak-Ping – 7-Eleven customer A
- Yai Tat-Sing – Little boy
- Yau Ka-Lam – Little girl
- Amy Yeung – Northern hooker C
- Devily Yeung – Fishball girl A
- Yip Ying-Wai – Marriage registrar
- Yu Cheung-Man – Mainland China police A
- Yuen Mun-Lam – 7-Eleven customer C

== See also ==
- Prostitution in Hong Kong
