= Hong Kong Drama Award for Best Actor in Musical =

Annual theatrical award

Hong Kong Drama Award for Best Actor in Musical is presented by the Hong Kong Federation of Drama Societies at the Hong Kong Drama Awards ceremony, recognizing the most outstanding performance by an actor in a musical production of the year.

== Past winners ==
Year	Name	Title	Theatre company/production	Ref.
2025 (33rd)	Yuen Ho-yeung	Little Shop of Horrors 花樣獠牙	Chung Ying Theatre Company	
2025 (33rd)	Edwin Wan Po-ching	Little Shop of Horrors 花樣獠牙	Chung Ying Theatre Company	
2025 (33rd)	Melo Man	A Tale of the Young Shennong 少年神農的搖滾獨白	Musical Trio	
