= Hong Kong Drama Award for Best Musical Choreography =

Annual theatrical award

Hong Kong Drama Award for Best Musical Choreography is presented by the Hong Kong Federation of Drama Societies at the Hong Kong Drama Awards ceremony, recognizing the most outstanding choreography in a musical production of the year.

== Past winners ==
| Year | Name | Title | Theatre company/production | Ref. |
|---|---|---|---|---|
| 2025 (33rd) | Mohamed Drissi | The White Collar Principle 会社人間 | Hong Kong 3 Arts Musical Institute | |
| 2025 (33rd) | Ada Ho | Toasty's Graffiti Singing Adventure 多士妹唱遊Graffiti | Jumbo Kids Theatre | |
| 2025 (33rd) | Frankie Ho | Little Shop of Horrors 花樣獠牙 | Chung Ying Theatre Company | |
| 2025 (33rd) | Chan Nga-shan | A Tale of the Young Shennong 少年神農的搖滾獨白 | Musical Trio | |
