= Hong Kong Drama Award for Best Lyrics =

Annual theatrical award

Hong Kong Drama Award for Best Lyrics is presented by the Hong Kong Federation of Drama Societies at the Hong Kong Drama Awards ceremony, recognizing the most outstanding lyrics written for theatre production of the year.

== Past winners ==
Year	Name	Title	Theatre company/production	Ref.
2019 (28th)	Henry Fong	The Only King II 唯獨袮是王II	The Only Stage	
2019 (28th)	Oscar Lee	The Miracles of the Namiya General Store 解憂雜貨店	Chung Ying Theatre Company	
2019 (28th)	Chris Shum	Ladies, Bon Voyage! 祝你女途愉快	Hong Kong Repertory Theatre	
2020 (29th)	Wong Wing-sze	Love Death and Everything In-between 三生三世愛情餘味	Yat Po Singers	
2020 (29th)	Chris Shum	This Victoria Has No Secrets 維多利雅講	Yat Po Singers	
2020 (29th)	Cheung Fei-fan	Go Lion! Goal! 熱鬥獅子球	Theatre Space	
2022 (30th)	Cheung Fei-fan	A Tale of the Southern Sky 一水南天	Hong Kong Dance Company and Actors' Family	
2022 (30th)	Cheung Fei-fan	Westside Twirling Dream 夢綣塘西	Theatre Space	
2022 (30th)	Chris Shum	The Woman in Kenzo 穿Kenzo的女人	Chung Ying Theatre Company	
2023 (31st)	Chris Shum	The Impossible Trial 大狀王	Hong Kong Repertory Theatre and West Kowloon Cultural District	
2023 (31st)	Leung Shing-him (Note: stage name Yatyau (Chinese: 一休)) and Peco Chui	Love at First Snow 今年初雪，把失雪完結！	Class 7A Drama Group	
2023 (31st)	Jordan Cheng	Next to Normal 下一站⋯正常	Hong Kong 3 Arts Musical Institute	
2024 (32nd)	Chung Chi-wing	February 14; 2月14	Hong Kong Repertory Theatre and Yat Po Singers	
2024 (32nd)	Serena Tong	Africian Lion @ Chungking Mansions 重慶大廈的非洲雄獅	Theatre Space	
2024 (32nd)	Leung Pak-kin	Om Encounter 庵藏不露	Yat Po Singers	
2025 (33rd)	Sunny Lam	Di-Dar	Windmill Grass Theatre	
2025 (33rd)	Fong Yeuk Kwan	The Mad Ones 狂花駕駛課程	Musical Trio	
2025 (33rd)	Ek Wong	Toasty's Graffiti Singing Adventure 多士妹唱遊Graffiti	Jumbo Kids Theatre	
2026 (34th)	Chung Chi-wing	What the Buddha Said	Hong Kong Academy for Performing Arts	
2026 (34th)	Ek Wong	Little Star and the Great Prairie	Jumbo Kids Theatre	
2026 (34th)	Jordan Cheng	Hedwig and the Angry Inch	West Kowloon Cultural District	
