= Golden Chicken =

2002 Hong Kong film by Samson Chiu

- DVD cover art
- Directed by: Samson Chiu
- Written by: Samson Chiu; Matt Chow
- Produced by: Peter Chan; Jojo Hui
- Starring: Sandra Ng; Eric Tsang; Andy Lau; Tony Leung Ka-fai; Hu Jun; Eason Chan
- Cinematography: Jacky Tang
- Edited by: Cheung Ka-Fai
- Music by: Peter Kam
- Production companies: Applause Pictures; Panorama Entertainment
- Release date: 26 December 2002 (Hong Kong)
- Running time: 106 minutes
- Country: Hong Kong
- Language: Cantonese

Golden Chicken (金雞 gam1 gai1) is a 2002 Hong Kong comedy-drama film directed by Samson Chiu starring Sandra Ng and involving cameo appearances from Andy Lau and Eric Tsang.

The film won three Golden Horse Awards in 2003, including Best Leading Actress for Sandra Ng and Best Makeup and Costume Design.

It was followed by two sequels: Golden Chicken 2 in 2003 and Golden Chicken 3 in 2014.

== Synopsis ==
Kam (Sandra Ng) is a long time Hong-Kong prostitute. When she gets locked inside a cash machine vestibule with a would be thief (Eric Tsang) she relates to him some stories of her life as a prostitute and how she came to enter her profession.

== Cast ==
- Sandra Ng – Kam
- Eric Tsang – James Bong
- Andy Lau – Himself
- Tony Leung Ka-fai – Professor Chan
- Eason Chan – Steely Willy
- Hu Jun – Ip Chi Kon
- Alfred Cheung – Doctor Cheung
- Chapman To – Club owner
- Felix Wong – Richard
- Tiffany Lee Lung-Yee – Kimmy
- Kristal Tin – Kam's mamasan
- Irene Tsu – Kam's aunt

== Awards ==
- 22nd Annual Hong Kong Film Awards
  - Nomination – Best Picture
  - Nomination – Best Actress (Sandra Ng Kwun-Yu)
  - Nomination – Best Supporting Actress (Krystal Tin Yui-Lei)
  - Nomination – Best Art Direction (Hai Chung-Man and Wong Bing-Yiu)
  - Nomination – Best Costume Design (Hai Chung-Man and Dora Ng Lei-Lo)
- 40th Annual Golden Horse Awards
  - Winner – Best Actress (Sandra Ng Kwun-Yu)
  - Winner – Best Art Direction (Hai Chung-Man and Wong Bing-Yiu)
  - Winner – Best Makeup and Costume Design (Hai Chung-Man and Dora Ng Lei-Lo)
