= The Closet (2007 film) =

2007 Hong Kong film by Kin-Nam Cho

- Directed by: Kin-Nam Cho
- Starring: Francis Ng; Yang Chihfei; Michelle Ye; Cheung Siu-Fai
- Release date: 8 March 2007
- Country: Hong Kong
- Languages: Cantonese; Mandarin

The Closet (Chinese: 異塚; pinyin: yì zhǒng) is a 2007 Hong Kong film directed by Kin-Nam Cho.

== Plot ==
Due to his rebellious nature, Lo Fei suffered a traumatic childhood with abuse and maltreatment from his bad-tempered but famous sculptor father. Apart from receiving corporal punishment and verbal abuse, he was often locked up inside the wardrobe. The dark childhood turned Lo into a weirdo frequently tormented by the pain of childhood memories as well as hallucination of his dead father. Lo betrayed his father's artistic career and chose to become a magician and performer of extremities instead, to prove his own capabilities. During one of his death-defying show, Lo was seriously wounded by shocks of his childhood nightmares. Not knowing the truth behind it, his girlfriend Lei thought he was stretching his physical strength too far. She therefore took him to a quiet retreat in the suburb to recuperate. On a windy moonless night, the five of them went through a terrifying catastrophe.

== Cast ==
- Francis Ng as Lo Fei
- Yang Chih-fei as Lei Hiu-king
- Michelle Ye as Mang Ping
- Cheung Siu-Fai as Ngok Fung
