= Yesteryou, Yesterme, Yesterday =

1993 Hong Kong film by Samson Chiu

Yesteryou, Yesterme, Yesterday 記得...香蕉成熟時
- DVD cover
- Directed by: Samson Chiu
- Written by: Lee Chi-Ngai
- Produced by: Peter Chan; Wallace Cheung Kwok Chung
- Starring: Fung Bo Bo; Ellen Lo; Eric Tsang; John Tang; Ann Bridgewater
- Cinematography: Jingle Ma
- Edited by: Chan Ki-hop
- Music by: Richard Lo
- Production company: Movie Impact Limited
- Release date: 30 April 1993 (Hong Kong)
- Running time: 93 minutes
- Country: Hong Kong
- Language: Cantonese
- Box office: HK$6.08 million (Hong Kong)

Yesteryou, Yesterme, Yesterday (記得...香蕉成熟時) is a 1993 Hong Kong Cantonese comedy-drama film directed by Samson Chiu and starring Fung Bo Bo, Ellen Lo, Eric Tsang, John Tang and Roy Wong.

The film forms a trilogy with:

- Over the Rainbow, Under the Skirt (1994)
- Yesterday You, Yesterday Me (1997)

== Cast ==
- Fung Bo Bo
- Ellen Lo
- Eric Tsang
- John Tang
- Ann Bridgewater
- Roy Wong
- Michael Miu
- Barry Wong
