= Miss Chinese International Pageant 1999 =

- Date: February 14, 1999
- Presenters: Carol Cheng, Cutie Mui, Louis Yuen, Cheung Tat-Ming, Jerry Lamb
- Entertainment: Nick Cheung, Mariane Chan
- Venue: TVB City, Hong Kong
- Broadcaster: TVB
- Entrants: 17
- Placements: 5
- Winner: Michelle Ye; New York City, USA
- Congeniality: Mabel Wong; Calgary, Canada

Miss Chinese International Pageant 1999 was held on February 14, 1999 in Hong Kong. The pageant was organized and broadcast by TVB in Hong Kong. Miss Chinese International 1998 Louisa Luk of San Francisco, USA crowned her Michelle Ye of New York City, USA as the 11th Miss Chinese International. The victory marked the first back to back winners for the United States.

== Pageant information ==
The theme to this year's pageant is "Showcasing Oriental Charm, Displaying Glamour of the Century." 「展現東方魅力 發放世紀風情」. The Masters of Ceremonies were Carol Cheng, Cutie Mui, Louis Yuen, Cheung Tat-Ming, and Jerry Lamb. Special performing guests were TVB actors Nick Cheung and Mariane Chan.

== Results ==
Placement	Contestant	City Represented	Country Represented
Miss Chinese International 1999	Michelle Ye 葉璇	New York City	USA
1st Runner-Up	Janet Huang 黃仁玉	Los Angeles	USA
2nd Runner-Up	Anne Heung 向海嵐	Hong Kong	Hong Kong
Top 5 Finalists	Debbie Goh 吳淑心; Audrey Li 李酈	Kuala Lumpur; Toronto	Malaysia; Canada

=== Special awards ===
- Miss Friendship: Mabel Wong 黃淑儀 (Calgary)
- Miss Classic Beauty: Michelle Ye 葉璇 (New York)

== Contestant list ==
No.	Contestant Name	Represented City	Represented Country	Age
1	Felicia KEW 邱美玲	Singapore	Singapore	19
2	Alice TAM 譚敏敏	San Francisco	USA	22
3	Debbie GOH 吳淑心	Kuala Lumpur	Malaysia	21
4	Mabel WONG 黃淑儀	Calgary	Canada	24
5	Xin WANG 王昕	Montréal	Canada	20
6	Julia YEUNG 楊孫康	London	United Kingdom	19
7	Joyce CHANG 張歆平	Taipei	Chinese Taipei	24
8	Audrey LI 李酈	Toronto	Canada	19
9	Janice LEE 李孟潔	Vancouver	Canada	19
10	Cynthia SEID 薛美怡	Chicago	USA	25
11	Sandy CHANSAY 陳珍麗	Tahiti	French Polynesia	19
12	Janet HUANG 黃仁玉	Los Angeles	USA	19
13	Yan WANG 王妍	Seattle	USA	20
14	Michelle YE 葉璇	New York City	USA	19
15	Monica WANG 王萌萌	Sydney	Australia	19
16	Racyne YOUNG 楊桂蘭	Honolulu	USA	23
17	Anne HEUNG 向海嵐	Hong Kong	Hong Kong	24

== Contestant notes ==
-Michelle Ye was originally 2nd runner up at New York's regional pageant. She went on to compete in Hong Kong after the winner resigned, and the 1st runner up declined the title.

-Anne Heung later represented Hong Kong and competed at Miss Universe 1999. She was unplaced, but placed 7th overall in the online Miss Photogenic polls.

== Crossovers ==
Contestants who previously competed or will be competing at other international beauty pageants:

Miss Universe

- 1999: Hong Kong: Anne Heung
