= The First 7th Night =

2009 Hong Kong film by Herman Yau

- Film poster
- Directed by: Herman Yau
- Written by: Tin Yin-yee; Herman Yau
- Produced by: Lex Tsai
- Starring: Gordon Lam; Julian Cheung; Michelle Ye; Eddie Cheung
- Cinematography: Ngai Man-yin
- Edited by: Azrael Chung
- Music by: Mak Chun Hung
- Production company: Phaedra Pictures
- Distributed by: East Act Entertainment
- Release date: 21 May 2009
- Running time: 100 minutes
- Country: Hong Kong
- Language: Cantonese

The First 7th Night (simplified Chinese: 头七; traditional Chinese: 頭七) is a 2009 Hong Kong horror film directed by Herman Yau and starring Gordon Lam, Julian Cheung, Michelle Ye and Eddie Cheung. The film was rated Category III by the Hong Kong motion picture rating system.

== Plot ==
A mysterious passenger "Pony" (Julian Cheung) hires a taxi to direct him and his truck to Sun Moon Village. "Map King" is the only driver who knows the way but he is reluctant because its a 6-hour ride. Pony offers $2000, and Map King eventually accepts. Map King leads in his taxi and Pony follows in his truck and they stay in touch via radio.

During the way Pony asks about his destination the "Chun Lei Restaurant". Map King recounts that the village is very poor. Map King recalls that the restaurant's original owner left the Restaurant to his older daughter Fong (Michelle Ye), and her portly son. The younger daughter Lian inherited the chicken coops. One summer, thirty years ago, four escaped convicts visited the restaurant carrying a case of gold. They tell her they intend to stay the night. Fong's husband had recently died, and this is the seventh night, when the spirit of the deceased is believed to return. She lights a trail of candles to guide the way. The convicts begin to argue when they believe that one of them, Chan Keung, has interfered with Fong. They start shooting at one another, and Chan Keung appears to become possessed and shoots himself in the genitals. The place then catches fire and burns down.

Map King and Pony stop for a quick bite after Map King gets two flat tires. Pony expresses disbelief at the story Map King just told and asks whether Fong and her son survived, but Map King does not answer. He then rides with Pony in the truck, and Pony claims to know the truth about what happened to Fong and her son.The bandits arrive at the restaurant, though their leader has an eye injury. The convicts grow suspicious of each other and tell Fong they will stay the night. Fong is defiant and tells them to leave, but they strike her. While cooking a meal, Fong attempts to seduce "Chicken" to learn how much money is in the suitcase and suggests they split the loot and go their separate ways. The leader argues with Fong, prompting Chan Keung to pull a gun on her, after which Chicken pulls a gun on Chan Keung. Chicken then pulls a gun on Chan Keung. Fong leaves the room, and the men withdraw their guns. The leader tells Chan to take care of Fong and he goes upstairs. Chan and Fong turn out to be lovers. Chicken goes upstairs and sees Fong and Chan embracing. Chicken is shot and his body rolls downstairs. The leader and Bo are shot. Fong then goes to retrieve the suitcase which is chained to the leader's wrist. Fong cuts his wrist off while the leader is still alive. The leader screams in pain and Fong sets him on fire which burns down the restaurant. Fong leaves her son with her sister and tells her she will return in three months. Fong leaves with Chan. They are arrested. Chan takes the rap for the murders and Fong receives a 30-year jail sentence.

Lian's husband mistreats Fong's son. When Fong is thirteen, he assaults Lian's husband and runs away. The son would eventually become a taxi driver. Both are silent after Pony tells this story. They reach the Restaurant, and Pony asks Map King to deliver what is in the truck to the restaurant. Map Kings opens the door and sees his mother in her youth, speaking to him. He piggy backs her into the Restaurant. During the walk they talk about their times together remember what little good times they had. Fong thanks him for remembering her and asks him to forgive her. He puts her down and she walks into the ruined restaurant. Inside there is a trail of candles and an older woman. Fong disappears and the older woman who turns out to be Lian. Lian reveals that Fong had died in prison with only 5 months left to serve. Tonight was the seventh night when her spirit would return.

== Cast ==
- Gordon Lam as Map King
- Julian Cheung as Pony
- Michelle Ye as Fong
- Eddie Cheung as Chan Keung
- Fung Hark-On as Bandit chief
- Tony Ho Wah-chiu as Chicken
- Chiu Yu-nung as Bo
- Nahatai Lekbumrung as Lian
- Lex Tsai as Hung
- Bruce Law as Mechanic
