= News Attack =

1989 Hong Kong film by Samson Chiu

- Film poster
- Traditional Chinese: 神行太保
- Simplified Chinese: 神行太保
- Hanyu Pinyin: Shén Xíng Tài Bǎo
- Jyutping: San4 Hang4 Taai3 Bou2
- Directed by: Samson Chiu
- Screenplay by: Yuen Kai-chi; Samson Chiu
- Produced by: Peter Chan
- Starring: Andy Lau; Michael Miu; Wilson Lam; Cally Kwong; Eric Tsang
- Cinematography: Andrew Lau
- Edited by: Chan Kei-hop
- Music by: Wai Ming; Richard Lo
- Production company: Children's Town
- Distributed by: Children's Town
- Release date: 25 May 1989
- Running time: 91 minutes
- Country: Hong Kong
- Language: Cantonese
- Box office: HK$5,744,381

News Attack is a 1989 Hong Kong action thriller drama film co-written and directed by Samson Chiu and starring Andy Lau, Michael Miu and Wilson Lam.

== Plot ==
Rich heir Yeung Ka-chung (Wilson Lam) is a newcomer reporter. After several incidents including one saving a girl from jumping down a building, he develops great respect towards his colleagues, veteran Chui Kit (Michael Miu) and daredevil reporter Turbo (Andy Lau), admiring their sense of justice, competence, courageousness and cleverness. The two become Ka-chung's mentors and friends.

Led by Kit, the trio worked together to uncover ugly behavior of powerful tycoon Joseph Pong (Wong Kam-kong), which include forcing his mistress (Cally Kwong) to abortion which led to her suicide. Angered of the shame it caused him, Pong sends his underling to beat up Kit and led him to unemployment.

Turbo and Ka-chung both support Kit and they continue to work together to gather evidence of Pong's bribery crimes, and after many hardship, they finally hand the evidence to the police and bring Pong to justice.

== Cast ==
- Andy Lau as Turbo
- Michael Miu as Chui Kit
- Wilson Lam as Yeung Ka-chung
- Cally Kwong as Tung Yan
- Eric Tsang as Chief Editor Wong
- Lo Wei as Publisher Lo
- Wong Kam-kong as Joseph Pong
- Blackie Ko as Joseph's thug
- Chiu Hung-sin as suicide girl
- Anthony Wong as Joseph's associate
- James Ha as robber
- Chu Tau as robber
- Nick Cheung as policeman at station
- Lau Siu-cheung as Reporter
- Wan Kam-cheung as Reporter
- Lo Kin as Inspector Cheung
- Leung Yuet-ping as Chung's mom
- Wu Shih as Old reporter
- Wong Chi-ming as Government office guard
- Lorraine Ho as Secretary
- Lai Koon-lam as Reporter
- Lee Wah-kon

== Box office ==
The film grossed HK$5,744,381 at the Hong Kong box office during its theatrical run from 25 May to 7 June 1989 in Hong Kong.

== See also ==
- Andy Lau filmography
