= Insanity (2015 film) =

2015 Hong Kong-Chinese film by David Lee

- Film poster
- Traditional Chinese: 暴瘋語
- Simplified Chinese: 暴疯语
- Hanyu Pinyin: Bào Fēng Yǔ
- Jyutping: Bou6 Fung1 Jyu2
- Directed by: David Lee
- Screenplay by: David Lee; Philip Lui; Derek Yee
- Produced by: Derek Yee; Law Chi-leung; Mandy Law
- Starring: Sean Lau; Huang Xiaoming; Fiona Sit
- Cinematography: Chan Chi-ying
- Edited by: Yau Chi-wai
- Music by: Leon Ko
- Production companies: Bona Film Group; Sil-Metropole Organisation; Film Unlimited
- Distributed by: Distribution Workshop
- Release dates: April 2, 2015 (Hong Kong); April 3, 2015 (China)
- Running time: 99 minutes
- Countries: Hong Kong; China
- Language: Cantonese
- Box office: HK$3.18 million (Hong Kong); CN¥44 million (China)

Insanity (Chinese: 暴瘋語) is a 2015 psychological thriller film directed by David Lee and starring Sean Lau and Huang Xiaoming. A Hong Kong-Chinese co-production, it was released on April 2, 2015, in Hong Kong and a day later in China on April 3, 2015.

== Premise ==
A promising psychiatrist faces the dark side of his mind once again after treating a patient who was convicted of murder.

== Cast ==
- Sean Lau as Fan Kwok-sang (范國生)
- Huang Xiaoming as Chow Ming-kit (周明杰)
- Fiona Sit as Shum Po-yee (岑寶兒)
- Alex Fong as Doctor Lui (雷醫生)
- Paw Hee-ching as Fong Wai-ling's mother
- Michelle Ye as Fong Wai-ling (方慧玲)
- Fredric Mao as Director Lau (劉院長)
- Alien Sun as Chow Ming-kit's mother
- Bonnie Sin as Wong Yan-nei (王恩妮)
- Michelle Wai as Mona
- Joseph Lee as Officer Lee (李警官)

== Reception ==
By April 13, 2015, the film had earned HK$3.18 million at the Hong Kong box office and CN¥44.03 million at the Chinese box office.

== Awards and nominations ==
Awards and nominations
Ceremony	Category	Recipient(s)	Result
34th Hong Kong Film Awards	Best Actor	Sean Lau	Nominated
34th Hong Kong Film Awards	Best Supporting Actress	Paw Hee-ching	Nominated
34th Hong Kong Film Awards	Best Original Film Song	Song: "The Quiet Storm" (暴風雨) Composer: Leon Ko; Lyricist: Chris Shum; Performer: Eason Chan	Nominated
34th Hong Kong Film Awards	Best New Director	David Lee	Won
51st Golden Horse Awards	Best Supporting Actress	Paw Hee-ching	Nominated

== Soundtrack ==
"Insanity: Original Motion Picture Soundtrack"

Single by Eason Chan
- Released: March 15, 2015
- Genre: Film soundtrack
- Length: 3:38
- Label: Music Nation Publishing Co. Ltd.
- Songwriters: Chris Shum, Leon Ko

No.	Title	Writer(s)	Performer	Length
1.	"The Quiet Storm 暴風雨"	Chris Shum, Leon Ko	Eason Chan	3:38
