= Rice Rhapsody =

2004 Hong Kong film by Kenneth Bi

- Promotional film poster
- Directed by: Kenneth Bi
- Written by: Kenneth Bi
- Produced by: Rosa Li
- Starring: Sylvia Chang; Martin Yan; Mélanie Laurent; LePham Tan; Craig Toh; François Henri Savoureux
- Cinematography: Lam Wah-Chuen
- Edited by: Rob Tinworth
- Music by: Masahiro Kawasaki
- Distributed by: JCE Movies Limited
- Release dates: 11 October 2004 (Pusan International Film Festival); 20 January 2005 (Hong Kong); 24 February 2005 (Singapore)
- Running time: 106 minutes
- Countries: Hong Kong; Singapore
- Languages: Mandarin; English; French
- Box office: $113,778

Rice Rhapsody (alternative title Hainan Chicken Rice) (Chinese: 海南雞飯, literally meaning "Hainanese chicken rice") is a 2004 film directed by Kenneth Bi. The cast includes Sylvia Chang and Martin Yan. Jackie Chan was one of the executive producers.

== Plot ==
The film is set in Singapore's Chinatown. It is narrated by Jen Fan, owner of a successful restaurant. Her signature dish is chicken rice—in fact, she is rather well known for it. Jen has three sons: Daniel, Harry, and Leo. Daniel and Harry are gay, and Jen is determined that the youngest, Leo, does not go the same way. She enlists the help of her friend Kim-Chui, who owns a duck rice restaurant. He is less successful than Jen but is in love with her. Leo has become her life, and she is pinning all her hopes of grandchildren on him. She and Kim-Chui hatch a plan that involves bringing Sabine, a female French exchange student, to stay at Jen's house.

When Sabine arrives, Leo predictably shows little interest in her. It is painfully clear to all except Jen that Leo is in love with his best friend "Batman". Sabine is very laid-back and mystical in her outlook, and the family warm to her. It is she who ultimately helps Jen come to terms with her life.

When "Batman" suddenly announces that he is leaving Singapore, Jen finally realises the truth from Leo's grief-stricken face and strikes him in fury. As he leaves the house, she falls down the stairs chasing him, injuring her ankle.

Some time later Jen, persuaded by Sabine, attends Harry's birthday party. There she meets many of Harry's gay friends, and she finds them delightful and fun. Another obstacle she must overcome is news of Daniel's impending gay marriage; she is horrified and cannot accept it. The film ends with Jen finally realising how wonderful her sons truly are. She may also consider a future with the ever loyal Kim-Chui, but this is left open.

== Themes ==
Rice Rhapsody is a comedy with serious themes, including homosexuality and acceptance. The irony is that Jen has three loving, successful sons. Harry, the hairdresser showers her with beauty products. Daniel is a flight attendant. Leo is serious and studious. However, she cannot see beyond her concerns about them being gay. Both Kim-Chui and Sabine eventually help Jen to accept them for what they are, and the film, although comic, strikes a poignant note as well. An example is the longing expression in Jen's eyes as she gazes at a friend's grandson. Food is also an important theme integral to the plot. The preparation and serving of food are all lovingly portrayed. Sabine the vegetarian never consumes the one thing Jen does best, the chicken rice of the title. One comic subplot involves some friendly competition between Jen and Kim-Chui, whose speciality is Duck Rice, resulting in a TV cookery standoff that allows Leo to reconcile with Jen.

== Cast and roles ==
- Sylvia Chang - Jen, the owner of a chicken rice restaurant and the mother of Daniel, Harry, and Leo.
- Martin Yan - Kim-Chui, the owner of a duck rice restaurant who was recruited by Jen to bring Sabine to Jen's house.
- Mélanie Laurent - Sabine, a French exchange student
- LePham Tan - Leo, Jen's youngest son who is in love with "Batman"
- Andy Mok - "Batman", Leo's love interest
- Craig Toh - Harry, one of Jen's sons
- Alvin Chiang - Daniel, one of Jen's sons
- Maggie Q - Gigi
- Ivy Ling Po - Grandma
- Chin Han - Grandpa (credited as Ronald Bi)
- Samuel Chong - Master of Ceremony
- Steph Song - Jennifer
- Ernest Seah - Lenny
- Edric Hsu - Benny
- Alvin Lim - Kenny

== Awards ==
- 25th Hong Kong Film Awards:
  - Won: Best New Director (Kenneth Bi)
  - Nominated: Best Actress (Sylvia Chang)
- Jury Award for Best Actress (Sylvia Chang, 2005 Newport Beach Film Festival)
- Platinum Award for Best First Feature (Kenneth Bi, 2005 Worldfest Houston)
- Top Ten Chinese Language Films of 2005 (Chinese Film Critics Association)
- Outstanding Screenplay (Kenneth Bi, Taiwan Government Information Office)
