= Hong Kong Drama Award for Best Supporting Actor in Musical =

Annual theatrical award

Hong Kong Drama Award for Best Supporting Actor in Musical is presented by the Hong Kong Federation of Drama Societies at the Hong Kong Drama Awards ceremony, recognizing the most outstanding performance by a supporting actor in a musical production of the year.

== Past winners ==
Year	Name	Title	Theatre company/production	Ref.
2025 (33rd)	Hugo Tung Long-sang	A Tale of the Young Shennong 少年神農的搖滾獨白	Musical Trio	
2025 (33rd)	Melo Man	The Mad Ones 狂花駕駛課程	Musical Trio	
2025 (33rd)	Christopher Ying	The White Collar Principle 会社人間	Hong Kong 3 Arts Musical Institute	
