= Michelle Ye =

Chinese actress and producer

- 葉璇
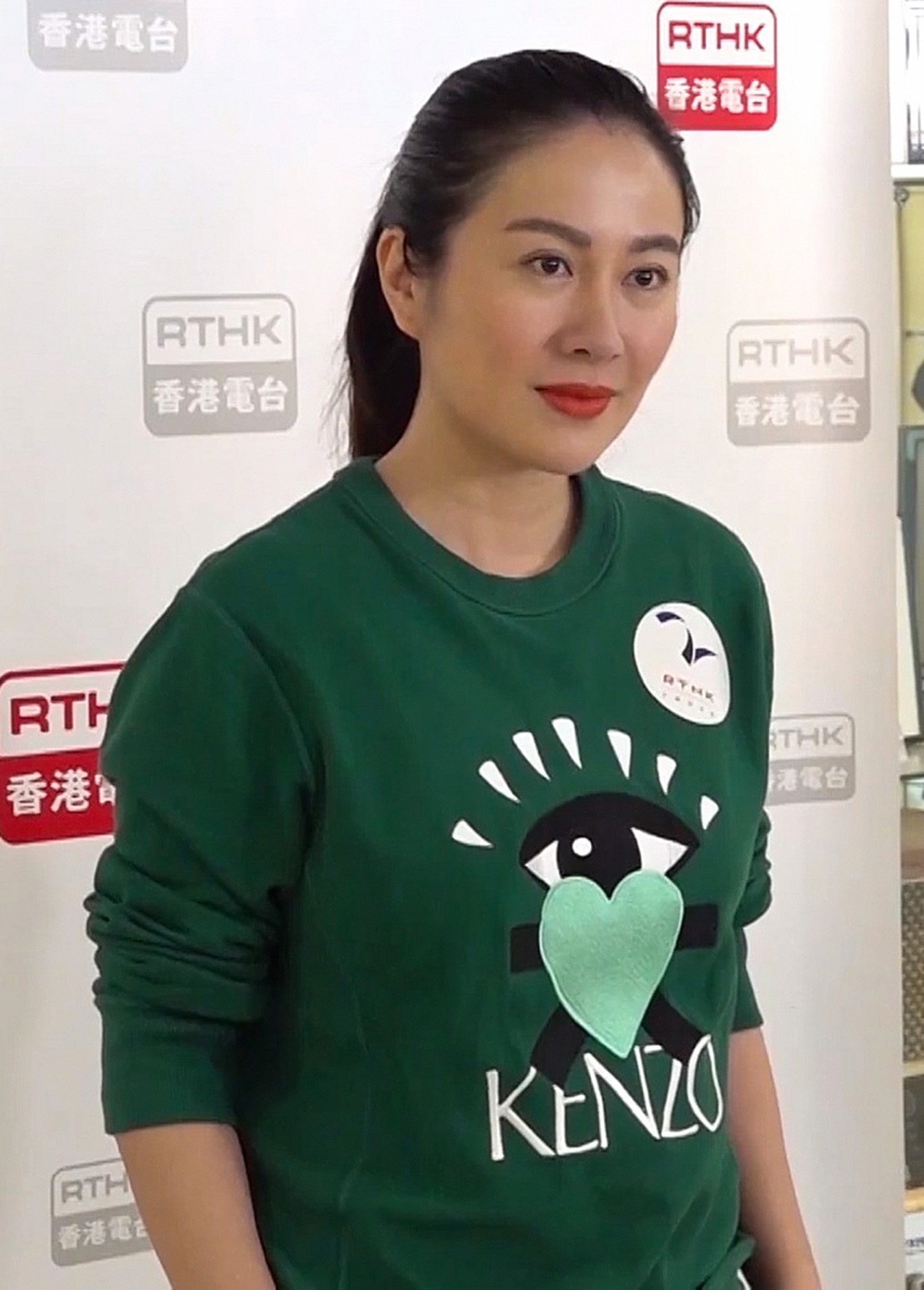
- Ye in 2020
- Born: 14 February 1980 (age 46); Hangzhou, China
- Occupations: Actress; entrepreneur; model; spokesperson
- Years active: 1999–present
- Awards: Hong Kong Film Awards – Best Supporting Actress; 2010 Accident

Chinese name
- Traditional Chinese: 葉璇
- Simplified Chinese: 叶璇
Transcriptions
Standard Mandarin
- Hanyu Pinyin: Yè Xuán
Yue: Cantonese
- Jyutping: Jip6 Xun4
- Musical career
- Also known as: Ye Xuan, Michelle Yip, Yip Suen
- Origin: China

Michelle Ye or Ye Xuan (born 14 February 1980) is a Chinese actress and producer. She is best known for her roles in Eternal Happiness, Triumph in the Skies, and Lost in the Chamber of Love. Her most notable role was in the 2009 film Accident, in which she won the 2010 Hong Kong Film Award for Best Supporting Actress.

Ye has worked as an on-site reporter for TVB at the Olympic Games in Athens in 2004. In 1999, she won the Miss Chinese International competition.

Apart from her acting career, she is the owner and chairman of the production company Michelle Ye Studios-Zhejiang Bohai Television Ltd, the owner of a sushi restaurant, and the vice-president of the Hengdian Film Association.

== Early life ==
Michelle Ye was born in Hangzhou, China. She was named after her mother's favorite actress Zhou Xuan. Ye's mother was a housewife and her father a lawyer. Her father was constantly on business travel, thus leaving Ye to be cared for by her mother solely. When Ye was seven years old, her father moved overseas and only returned home for a total number of weeks within a year. Ye's parents divorced when she was nine years old. Her mother no longer wanted to care for her and instead wanted Ye's father to know what it was like to take care of their child.

Ye then lived with her paternal grandparents. Her grandparents were retired professors who lived in a professor's hostel in the university. Her grandfather was very strict with her academics, and under his guidance, her academic results were good. She was involved in a lot of school activities.

At the age of 10, her father brought her grandparents and Ye to New York City. Her grandparents could not acclimate to the new environment and returned to China. Her father was still busy with his career, and at the age of 13, Ye asked to move out. Her father agreed and let her rent an apartment. Every month she would go to her father's company for spending money, and was otherwise self-sufficient. To earn extra money, she lied about her age to work in a video rental store, from where she rented many series and movies, sparking her interest in the entertainment business.

She attended John Dewey High School. While there, she learned to speak Cantonese from a classmate. She won first place in the botany category at the International Science and Engineering Fair in 1998. She was the valedictorian of her class, thus earning a full scholarship to Wellesley College, where she majored in political science.

She competed in Hong Kong for the Miss Chinese International 1999 competition on her birthday and won.

== Entertainment career ==
In 2011, Michelle Ye's contract with Media Asia Films expired and she chose not to renew it and left to set up Michelle Ye Studio in Beijing, signing with Qiangshi Media as a producer.

== Other projects ==
Ye published an autobiography titled Shang Shan Ruo Shui - Xuan Gong Lue in July 2006.

In 2011, Ye established her own production company (Michelle Ye Studios-Zhejiang Bohai Television Ltd) and has produced and starred in three series thus far, Ninth Widow, Athena, and Purple Hairpin. However, Ye has not ruled out a return to TVB, after revealing she invited by several producers.

== Awards and nominations ==
- (1999) Crowned first place as Miss Chinese International Pageant 1999
- (1999) Won "Miss Classic Beauty" Award in the "Miss Chinese International 1999"
- (2002) Nominated as "Most Improved Actress" for TVB 35th Anniversary Awards
- (2002) Nominated as "Favorite Partnership" with Raymond Lam for TVB 35th Anniversary Awards
- (2003) Nominated as "Most Improved Actress" for TVB 36th Anniversary Awards
- (2003) Nominated as "Favorite Actress" for TVB 36th Anniversary Awards
- (2003) Nominated as "Favorite Partnership" with Raymond Lam and Kenneth Ma for TVB 36th Anniversary Awards
- (2005) Nominated as "Best Newcomer" in Hong Kong Golden Horse Award for Moonlight in Tokyo
- (2009) Nominated as "The Best Leading Actress" in The 66th Venice Film Festival for Accident
- (2010) Won "Best Supporting Actress" in 29th Hong Kong Film Awards for Accident
- (2011) Won "Hong Kong and Taiwan's Most Popular Actress of the Year" in LeTV Entertainment Awards

== Filmography ==
=== Film ===
Year	Title	Role	Notes
2005	Moonlight in Tokyo	Lu	
2006	Undercover Hidden Dragon	Sister Han	
2007	The Closet	Mang Ping	
2007	Simply Actors	Judy	
2009	Lady Cop & Papa Crook	Yammy	
2009	The Sniper	Mon	
2009	Vengeance	pregnant woman	
2009	The First 7th Night	Fong	
2009	Murderer	Sonny's mother	
2009	Accident	Woman	
2010	Fire of Conscience	May	
2010	Dream Home	Flat 8A owner	
2010	Once a Gangster	Nancy	
2010	No Rest for Restrooms		Short film
2010	Bruce Lee, My Brother	Lee Hap-ngan	
2011	Hi, Fidelity	Josephine Ma / Jo-Jo	
2011	Choy Lee Fut Kung Fu		
2011	The Founding of a Party	Li Lizhuang	cameo
2011	Overheard 2	Tsui Foon	
2012	Motorway	Mrs. Lo	
2013	Hotel Deluxe		
2013	Drug War	Sal	
2014	Overheard 3	Luk Wing-yu	
2015	King of Mahjong	Ramona	
2015	Insanity		
2020	Thorn Kiss		

=== Television ===
Year	Title	Role	Notes
2000	Street Fighters	Ho Hei	
2001	Reaching Out	Jess	
2001	Gods of Honour	Yeung Lin-fa	
2002	Treasure Raiders	Cheung Git-git	guest star last episode
2002	Network Love Story	Yeung Wai-man	
2002	Eternal Happiness	Mang Lai-kwan	
2002	Golden Faith	Rain Ching	
2002	Lofty Water Verdant Bow	Lai Sing-nam	
2003	Evil Butterfly	Luo Yiping	
2003	Oriental Flower Maiden	Ma Qili	
2003	The Case of the Green Hair		mini movie
2003	The Driving Power	Ding Ming-jyu	
2003	Triumph in the Skies	Zita Tung	
2004	Hard Fate	young Suen Yeen-chou	guest star episode 7-8
2005	The Royal Swordsmen	Shangguan Haitang	
2005	Lost in the Chamber of Love	Cui Yingying	
2005	The Herbalist's Manual	Dong Ching	
2005	Central Affairs	Season	
2006	Central Affairs 2	Samantha	
2007	Liao Zhai II	Xiao Qiao	
2007	Jiao Yi Sheng Ma Ma	Jian Xiao Dan	
2007	Tutor Queen	Suki	
2010	The Legend of Yang Guifei	Madame Guo	
2010	Grandma's Ancient City		
2010	Spell of Fragrance	Su Hongyu / Su Yuning	
2011	Gang Hun	Da Daoshu	
2012	The Ninth Widow	Wang Putao	
2012	Find You	Ning Xinran	
2013	Athena		
2013	The Purple Hairpin	Fok Siu Yuk	TVB Overseas
2014	The Virtuous Queen of Han		Guest star episode 38
2014	Gu Cheng Wang Shi		
2014	Muse Dress		
2018	The People's Army	Jiang Xu	
2018	Lou Wai Lou		
2018	Flying Swords of Dragon Gate		
2020	In the Name of Father		

Achievements
Preceded by Louisa Luk	Miss Chinese International; 1999	Succeeded by Sonija Kwok
