= Hong Kong Drama Award for Best Supporting Actress in Musical =

Annual theatrical award

Hong Kong Drama Award for Best Supporting Actress in Musical is presented by the Hong Kong Federation of Drama Societies at the Hong Kong Drama Awards ceremony, recognizing the most outstanding performance by a supporting actress in a musical production of the year.

== Past winners ==
Year	Name	Title	Theatre company/production	Ref.
2025 (33rd)	Yoyo Wu Hei-man	Toasty's Graffiti Singing Adventure 多士妹唱遊Graffiti	Jumbo Kids Theatre	
2025 (33rd)	Chloe Wong Po-yin	A Tale of the Young Shennong 少年神農的搖滾獨白	Musical Trio	
2025 (33rd)	Mischa Ip Hau-lam	The Mad Ones 狂花駕駛課程	Musical Trio	
