= The Detective (2007 film) =

2007 Hong Kong film by Oxide Pang

- Promotional poster
- Traditional Chinese: C+偵探
- Simplified Chinese: C+侦探
- Hanyu Pinyin: C Jiā Zhēn Tàn
- Jyutping: C gaa1 zing1 taam3
- Directed by: Oxide Pang
- Written by: Oxide Pang; Thomas Pang
- Produced by: The Pang Brothers
- Starring: Aaron Kwok; Liu Kai-chi; Wayne Lai; Shing Fui-On
- Cinematography: Decha Srimantra
- Edited by: Curran Pang
- Music by: Jadet Chawang; Payont Permsith
- Production companies: Universe Entertainment; Sil-Metropole Organisation; Magic Head Film Production Co. Ltd.
- Distributed by: Universe Films Distribution Company
- Release date: 25 September 2007
- Running time: 109 minutes
- Country: Hong Kong
- Languages: Cantonese; Thai
- Box office: US$2,151,820

The Detective is a 2007 Hong Kong neo-noir mystery thriller film directed by Oxide Pang, and starring Aaron Kwok as a private investigator hired to track down a missing young woman who may be linked to a series of murders in Thailand. The film was followed by a sequel, The Detective 2, which was released in 2011.

== Plot ==
Tam (Aaron Kwok) is an impoverished private detective. One day, a guy nicknamed Fatty asks Tam to find a lady who wants to kill him. He leaves Tam a portrait and a large amount of cash without giving any other details. Tam cannot resist the offer and so his investigation starts.

Knowing that Sum, the lady in the picture, is a frequent visitor of a store where the picture was shot, Tam tries to get hints of her whereabouts from the storekeepers. He is told to find her through her mahjong playmates. Tam starts with Ming, but when he arrives at Ming's home, he finds Ming hanged in the living room.

As Tam continues to search for other mahjong playmates of Sum, he is shocked to find each of them murdered every time he is about to contact with them. He discovers a half-burned photo at one of the scenes. Tam realizes the suspicions behind the deaths and decides to protect the next target of the invisible murderer. The photo is the only clue for Tam to solve the case.

== Cast ==
- Aaron Kwok as Tam
- Liu Kai-chi as Inspector Fung Chak
- Wayne Lai as Sai Wing
- Kenny Wong as Kwong Chi-hung
- Shing Fui-On as Fei Lung
- Jo Koo as Yin

== Reception ==
Awards and nominations
Ceremony	Category	Recipient	Outcome
27th Hong Kong Film Awards	Best Actor	Aaron Kwok	Nominated
27th Hong Kong Film Awards	Best Film Editing	Oxide Pang, Curran Pang	Nominated
27th Hong Kong Film Awards	Best Art Direction	Anuson Pinyopotjanee	Nominated
27th Hong Kong Film Awards	Best Costume and Makeup Design	Surasak Warakitcharoen	Nominated
27th Hong Kong Film Awards	Best Original Film Score	Payont Permsith, Jadet Chawang	Nominated
27th Hong Kong Film Awards	Best Sound Design	Wachira Wongsaroj	Nominated
27th Hong Kong Film Awards	Best Visual Effects	Suchada Somasavachai	Nominated
44th Golden Horse Awards	Best Actor	Aaron Kwok	Nominated
44th Golden Horse Awards	Best Art Direction	Anuson Pinyopotjanee	Won
14th Hong Kong Film Critics Society Awards	Film of Merit	The Detective	Won
