= The Warlords =

2007 Chinese-Hong Kong film by Peter Chan

- Theatrical release poster

Chinese name
- Traditional Chinese: 投名狀
- Simplified Chinese: 投名状
- Literal meaning: discard account
Transcriptions
Standard Mandarin
- Hanyu Pinyin: tóu míngzhuàng
Yue: Cantonese
- Jyutping: Tau4 Ming4 Zong6
- Directed by: Peter Chan
- Written by: Xu Lan; Chun Tin-nam; Aubrey Lam; Huang Jianxin; Jojo Hui; He Jiping; Guo Junli; James Yuen
- Produced by: Peter Chan; Andre Morgan
- Starring: Jet Li; Andy Lau; Takeshi Kaneshiro; Xu Jinglei
- Cinematography: Arthur Wong
- Edited by: Wenders Li
- Music by: Chan Kwong-wing; Peter Kam; Chatchai Pongprapaphan; Leon Ko
- Production companies: Media Asia Films; China Film Group; Morgan & Chan Films
- Distributed by: Media Asia Distribution
- Release dates: 12 December 2007 (China); 13 December 2007 (Hong Kong)
- Running time: 127 minutes
- Countries: Hong Kong; China
- Language: Mandarin
- Budget: $40 million
- Box office: $42.9 million

The Warlords (投名狀), previously known as The Blood Brothers, is a 2007 epic historical action film directed and co-produced by Peter Chan, starring Jet Li, Andy Lau, Takeshi Kaneshiro and Xu Jinglei. A Hong Kong-Chinese co-production set in China in the 1860s during the Taiping Rebellion, the film revolves around the sworn brotherhood of three men.

The film was released on 13 December 2007 simultaneously in most of Asia, except Japan. It won a Hong Kong Film Award for Best Film and a Golden Horse Award for Best Feature Film. Li also won the Hong Kong Film Award and the Shanghai Film Critics Award for Best Actor, and became the highest paid actor in a Chinese-language movie, previously holding the record for his part in Hero (2002).

== Plot ==
The film is set in China in the 1860s during the Taiping Rebellion against the ruling Qing Empire. Pang Qingyun, the commander of an imperial battalion, is the sole survivor after a battle between imperial and rebel forces. He meets and befriends Zhao Erhu and Jiang Wuyang, the leaders of a bandit gang based in a nearby village, and joins them in raiding a rebel convoy for food supplies. That night, some imperial troops show up in the village and seize the supplies. Around this time, Pang starts a secret affair with Liansheng, Zhao's wife.

Since the villagers are poor and starving, Pang convinces them to form a militia and join imperial forces to suppress the rebellion. With Pang as their leader, the three men swear a blood oath and pledge loyalty to each other as brothers on the pain of death. Later, with minimal support from regular imperial forces, the militia scores a series of victories against the rebels. Over time, Pang becomes increasingly ambitious and prepares to attack the rebel-controlled city of Suzhou. However, Pang's imperial superiors have grown jealous of his success, so they start denying him reinforcements and supplies. As a result, the battle of Suzhou turns into a year-long siege in which the militia gradually runs out of food and supplies.

Zhao disguises himself and infiltrates Suzhou to assassinate the rebel commander, but learns that the commander is already planning to surrender. The commander allows Zhao to kill him on the condition that the imperials spare the lives of the rebels and civilians in the city. Meanwhile, Pang has managed to procure ten days' worth of supplies from a rival imperial commander. When he learns of the deal Zhao has made with the rebels, he refuses to honour it because the supplies are insufficient to support both the militia and the surrendered rebels. A dispute between Pang and Zhao ensues, after which Pang temporarily puts Zhao in chains to prevent him from interfering. Pang then orders Jiang to oversee the massacre of the surrendered rebels, and Jiang regretfully carries it out.

Embittered by Pang's decision, Zhao intends to desert the militia but Pang begs him to stay and points out that the massacre was necessary and they have to conserve their supplies for their next battle in Nanjing, the rebel capital city. If they win, they can stop the rebellion and prevent further bloodshed. Convinced that Pang's choices are for the greater good, Zhao reluctantly agrees. After the Battle of Nanjing which marks the end of the war, Pang is rewarded with the position of a viceroy by the imperial government. During this time, Pang and Zhao have grown apart due to mistrust, especially after Zhao oversteps his authority by distributing funds to their men without Pang's approval. Yet, Zhao refuses to turn against Pang when Pang's political rivals hint that he should.

Realising that he was losing control over Zhao and his men, Pang considers disbanding the militia and reluctantly plots Zhao's assassination as he fears that Zhao might cause trouble. When Jiang learns of Pang's plan, he tries to dissuade Pang and inadvertently discovers Pang's ongoing secret affair with Liansheng. Jiang blames Liansheng for breaking their brotherhood and kills her. Meanwhile, Zhao is tricked into thinking that Pang is in danger and goes to save him, only to fall into a trap and end up being killed without realising that it was Pang who wanted him dead.

After Jiang learns that Pang is responsible for Zhao's death, he attempts to kill Pang. Although Pang manages to fend off and defeat Jiang, he is fatally wounded by a sniper sent by his political rivals. As he collapses, he allows Jiang to deliver the coup de grâce and fulfil their oath. Offscreen, it is mentioned that Jiang is eventually arrested, made the scapegoat for Pang's assassination, and executed by lingchi. His last words are stated to be "dying is easy, living is harder".

== Cast ==
- Jet Li as Pang Qingyun
- Andy Lau as Zhao Erhu
- Takeshi Kaneshiro as Jiang Wuyang
- Xu Jinglei as Liansheng

== Production ==
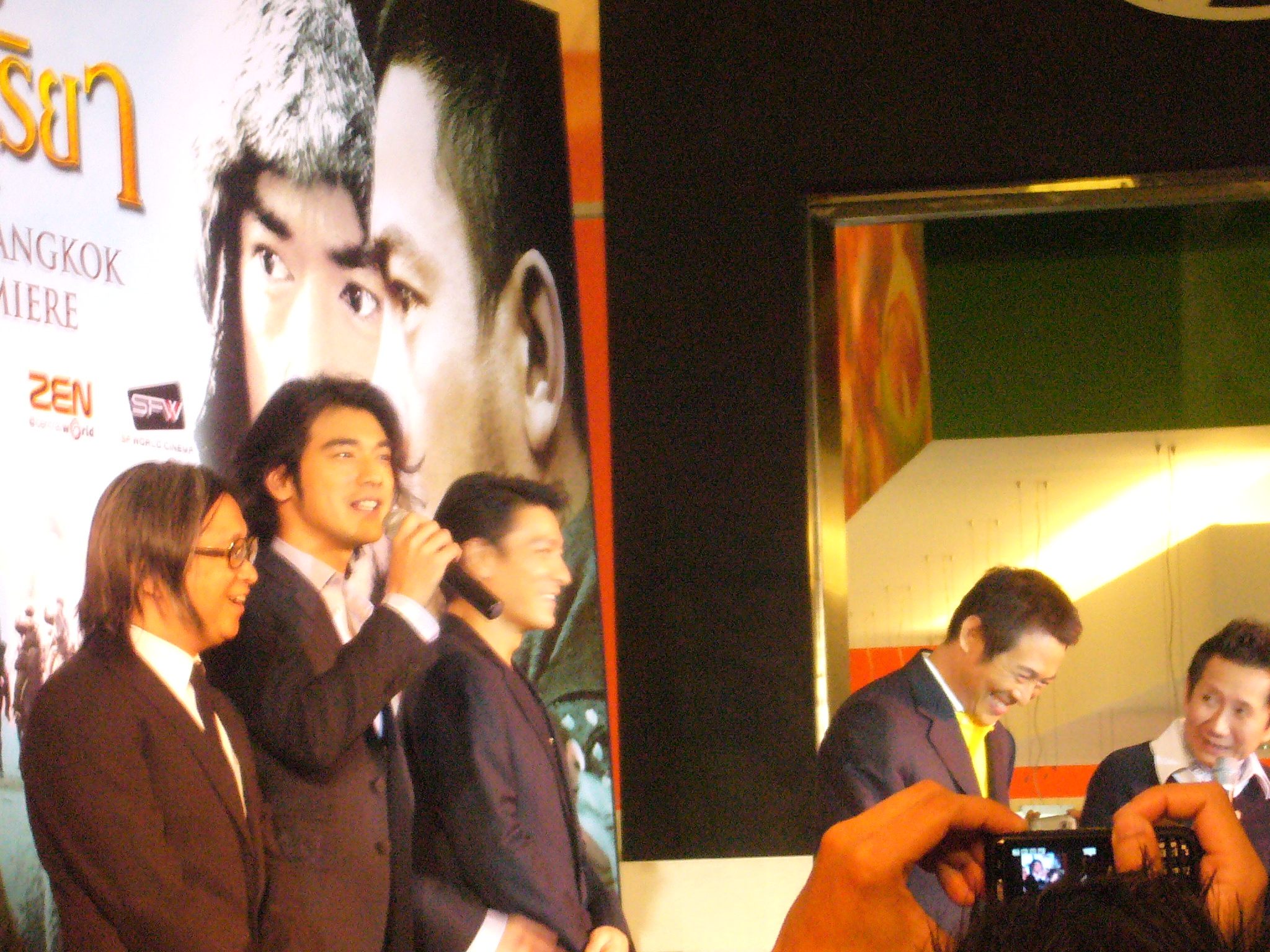
From left: director Peter Chan and stars Takeshi Kaneshiro, Andy Lau, and Jet Li at the premiere of The Warlords at SF World Cinema, CentralWorld, Bangkok.

The film was originally titled The Blood Brothers (刺馬). Director Peter Chan said it was influenced by Chang Cheh's 1973 film The Blood Brothers, which was based on a high-profile assassination of a local governor in 1870, but denied that it is a remake. He also decided to change the title to The Warlords in order to avoid confusion. (Note that there is another Chinese film with the English title Blood Brothers released in mid-2007.)

When asked why he chose to move away from his familiar turf of romance films, Chan said that The Warlords is actually not a martial arts film at its heart, though it contains elements of martial arts. He added that he had made a wish to make a film depicting men's affections after watching John Woo's 1986 film A Better Tomorrow over 20 years ago, and has now finally gotten the chance. His goal is thus to "lead [his] audience to reclaim [the same kind of passion]" as in A Better Tomorrow, which he said was lacking in recent films.

Shooting began in early December 2006 in Beijing. Many outdoor scenes were shot in Beijing, Shanghai and Hengdian World Studios.

The film ran into copyright troubles on 19 March 2007 when Chinese artist Wang Kewei filed a lawsuit against the film company for using his work in the promotional artworks without his consent. Wang claimed that in a short promotional video shown during a press conference held on 11 December 2006 in Beijing, the film company used ten pieces of his work with minor alterations. The film company has not given an official response.

Production of The Warlords officially wrapped up on 28 March 2007. Post-production work was done in Hong Kong, Los Angeles and Bangkok.

Jet Li received US$15 million, while Andy Lau received US$6 million and Takeshi Kaneshiro received US$2 million for the film. The film had a budget of US$40 million. The producers explained the huge salary for Li (over a third of the film's budget) by saying Li's participation ensured an international distribution for the film.

== Reception ==
The film won many prizes in many Hong Kong, Chinese, Asian and international film festivals in 2008 and 2009.

On Rotten Tomatoes, the film has an aggregated score of 65% based on 51 reviews.

Perry Lam of Muse has also given the film a generally positive review, praising it for taking "a clear-eyed but sympathetic look at its flawed heroes".

== Awards and nominations ==
Awards and nominations
Ceremony	Category	Recipient	Outcome
27th Hong Kong Film Awards	Best Film	The Warlords	Won
27th Hong Kong Film Awards	Best Director	Peter Chan	Won
27th Hong Kong Film Awards	Best Actor	Jet Li	Won
27th Hong Kong Film Awards	Best Actor	Andy Lau	Nominated
27th Hong Kong Film Awards	Best Cinematography	Arthur Wong	Won
27th Hong Kong Film Awards	Best Film Editing	Wenders Li	Nominated
27th Hong Kong Film Awards	Best Action Choreography	Ching Siu-tung	Nominated
27th Hong Kong Film Awards	Best Art Direction	Yee Chung-Man, Yi Zheng-zhou, Pater Wong	Won
27th Hong Kong Film Awards	Best Costume and Makeup Design	Yee Chung-Man, Jessie Dai, Lee Pik-kwan	Won
27th Hong Kong Film Awards	Best Sound Design	Sunit Asvinikul, Nakorn Kositpaisal	Won
27th Hong Kong Film Awards	Best Visual Effects	Ng Yuen-fai	Won
27th Hong Kong Film Awards	Best Original Film Score	Chan Kwong-wing, Peter Kam, Chatchai Pongprapaphan, Leon Ko	Nominated
45th Golden Horse Awards	Best Feature Film	The Warlords	Won
45th Golden Horse Awards	Best Director	Peter Chan	Won
45th Golden Horse Awards	Best Original Screenplay	Xu Lan, Chun Tin-nam, Aubrey Lam, Huang Jianxin, Jojo Hui, He Jiping, Guo Junli, James Yuen	Nominated
45th Golden Horse Awards	Best Actor	Jet Li	Nominated
45th Golden Horse Awards	Best Cinematography	Arthur Wong	Nominated
45th Golden Horse Awards	Best Film Editing	Wenders Li	Nominated
45th Golden Horse Awards	Best Art Direction	Yee Chung-Man, Yi Zheng-zhou, Pater Wong	Nominated
45th Golden Horse Awards	Best Makeup & Costume Design	Yee Chung-Man, Jessie Dai, Lee Pik-kwan	Nominated
45th Golden Horse Awards	Best Action Choreography	Ching Siu-tung	Nominated
45th Golden Horse Awards	Best Visual Effects	Eddy Wong, Victor Wong, Ken Law	Won
45th Golden Horse Awards	Best Sound Effects	Sunit Asvinikul, Nakorn Kositpaisal	Nominated
45th Golden Horse Awards	Best Original Film Score'	Chan Kwong-wing, Peter Kam, Chatchai Pongprapaphan, Leon Ko	Nominated
45th Golden Horse Awards	Best 800 Bandits	Bandit 1, Bandit 2, etc.	Won
2nd Asian Film Awards	Best Film	The Warlords	Nominated
2nd Asian Film Awards	Best Director	Peter Chan	Nominated
2nd Asian Film Awards	Best Actor	Jet Li	Nominated
2nd Asian Film Awards	Best Cinematographer	Arthur Wong	Nominated
2nd Asian Film Awards	Best Editor	Wenders Li	Nominated
2nd Asian Film Awards	Best Visual Effects	Ng Yuen-fai	Won

== See also ==
- List of historical drama films of Asia

Awards and achievements
Preceded by After This Our Exile	Hong Kong Film Awards for Best Film; 2008	Succeeded by Ip Man
Preceded by Lust, Caution	Golden Horse Awards for Best Film; 2008	Succeeded by No Puedo Vivir Sin Ti
