= Protégé (film) =

2007 Hong Kong-Singaporean film by Derek Yee

- Protégé theatrical poster

Chinese name
- Traditional Chinese: 門徒
- Simplified Chinese: 门徒
Transcriptions
Standard Mandarin
- Hanyu Pinyin: Mén Tú
Yue: Cantonese
- Jyutping: Mun4 Tou4
- Directed by: Derek Yee
- Written by: Derek Yee
- Produced by: Peter Chan
- Starring: Andy Lau; Daniel Wu; Louis Koo; Zhang Jingchu; Anita Yuen
- Cinematography: Venus Keung; Chan Wai-lin
- Edited by: Kong Chi-leung
- Music by: Peter Kam
- Production companies: Artforce International; Mediacorp Raintree Pictures; Global Entertainment Group Co.; China Film Group Corporation; Beijing Poly-bona Film Publishing Company; Beijing Jinyinma Movie & TV Culture Co.; Film Unlimited
- Distributed by: Hong Kong: Gala Film Distribution; Singapore: Golden Village Pictures; Mediacorp Raintree Pictures
- Release dates: 13 February 2007 (Hong Kong); 15 February 2007 (Singapore)
- Running time: 111 minutes
- Countries: Hong Kong; Singapore
- Language: Cantonese
- Box office: HK26,280,000

Protégé is a 2007 crime drama film written and directed by Derek Yee. A Hong Kong-Singaporean co-production, the film stars Andy Lau, Daniel Wu, Louis Koo, Zhang Jingchu and Anita Yuen.

== Plot ==
Undercover officer Nick had spent the last seven years penetrating into the core of a drug ring, working his way up from a street dealer post to the managerial position handling cargo deliveries for Kwan – the biggest player in the local heroin market. When the ailing Kwan makes Nick his protégé, Nick cannot help but sway before money and power and starts to perform his role like a real drug trafficker. This, together with his affair with heroin-addict Fan, causes Nick to become more and more confused about his true identity, and eventually leads to a disastrous end.

The film begins with a scene in a dark isolated rundown apartment building, showing a heroin addict living poorly with her young daughter. The scene then forwards to the perspective of Officer Nick who is suffering from loneliness just after completing an undercover assignment. He recalls the entire story of what happened and the events to lead to his emptiness.

Towards the end of the film, Nick finally builds a case strong enough to catch Kwan. However, Kwan realizes he has no way out and commits suicide traumatizing Nick because Kwan has put so much trust and faith in Nick, treating him like family. In addition, he finds that Fan who he had been looking after throughout the film, died of an overdose, discovering her body with rats on it. Due to this trauma, Nick completely goes into a breakdown. Swearing vengeance, and knowing that Fan's drug addicted husband was responsible for her death and encouraged her multiple times, Nick tricks Fan's husband into doing a drug run, however it turns out to be a trip to Singapore, and arriving at Changi Airport, Nick sets a trap with Singaporean customs officials to arrest Fan's husband on the spot. Nick then coldly informs Fan's husband that its over and that he will receive the death penalty under Singapore Law. Nick then returns home to Hong Kong, but is deeply affected by the death's of Kwan and Fan. He considers using drugs himself and just before he does, Fan's surviving daughter comes in and throws the drugs away saving Nick and silently reminding him he has something to live for.

== Cast ==
- Andy Lau as Lam Kwan
- Daniel Wu as Nick (Lee Chi-lik)
- Louis Koo as Fan's husband
- Zhang Jingchu as Fan (Pang Yuk-fan)
- Anita Yuen as Kwan's wife
- Derek Yee as Miu Chi-wah
- He Meitian as Kwan's sister in-law
- Liu Kai-chi as HKCED Customs Chief
- Nirut Sirijanya as Gen Chanchai
- Qi Yuwu as a Singaporean custom's official (Cameo Appearance)

== Production ==
The film was jointly produced by Artforce International, Mediacorp Raintree Pictures, Global Entertainment Group Co., China Film Group Corporation, Beijing Poly-bona Film Publishing Company, Beijing Jinyinma Movie & TV Culture Co., Film Unlimited.

== DVD release ==
Region 1 DVD (US & Canada)

On 24 February 2009 Dragon Dynasty, released "Protégé" on Region 1 DVD:

Special Features:

- Feature Length Audio Commentary with Hong Kong Cinema Expert Bey Logan
- The Making of Protégé Undercover & Over the Edge: An Exclusive Interview with Leading Man Daniel Wu
- Chasing the Dragon: An Exclusive Interview with Leading Lady Zhang Jingchu
- The Dealer: An Exclusive Interview with Producer Peter Chan
- Original Theatrical Trailer

== Critical reception ==
The film received generally positive reviews. Perry Lam, for example, wrote in Muse magazine, 'The movie is powerful precisely because it doesn't preach, and therefore spares us all the usual opinions, standard platitudes and naive assumptions about drug dealing and addiction.'

=== Awards and nominations ===
Awards and nominations
Ceremony	Category	Recipient	Outcome
27th Hong Kong Film Awards	Best Film	Protégé	Nominated
27th Hong Kong Film Awards	Best Director	Derek Yee	Nominated
27th Hong Kong Film Awards	Best Screenplay	Derek Yee, Chun Tin-nam, Lung Man-hong, Ko San	Nominated
27th Hong Kong Film Awards	Best Actress	Zhang Jingchu	Nominated
27th Hong Kong Film Awards	Best Supporting Actor	Andy Lau	Won
27th Hong Kong Film Awards	Best Supporting Actor	Louis Koo	Nominated
27th Hong Kong Film Awards	Best Supporting Actress	Anita Yuen	Nominated
27th Hong Kong Film Awards	Best New Performer	Tse Chi-tung	Nominated
27th Hong Kong Film Awards	Best Cinematography	Venus Keung	Nominated
27th Hong Kong Film Awards	Best Film Editing	Eric Kong	Won
27th Hong Kong Film Awards	Best Art Direction	Yee Chung-Man, Kenneth Mak	Nominated
27th Hong Kong Film Awards	Best Action Choreography	Chin Ka-lok	Nominated
27th Hong Kong Film Awards	Best Original Film Score	Peter Kam	Nominated
27th Hong Kong Film Awards	Best Sound Design	Kinson Tsang	Nominated
27th Hong Kong Film Awards	Best Visual Effects	Ho Siu-lun, Chow Kim-hung, Ching Han-wong	Nominated
44th Golden Horse Awards	Best Director	Derek Yee	Nominated
44th Golden Horse Awards	Best Original Screenplay	Derek Yee, Chun Tin-nam, Lung Man-hong, Ko San	Nominated
44th Golden Horse Awards	Best Supporting Actor	Louis Koo	Nominated
17th Hong Kong Screenwriters' Guild	Best Screenplay	Derek Yee, Chun Tin-nam, Lung Man-hong, Ko San	Won
20th Hong Kong Film Directors' Guild	Most Outstanding Director	Derek Yee	Won
20th Hong Kong Film Directors' Guild	Most Recommended Film	Protégé	Won
12th Golden Bauhinia Awards	Top Ten Chinese-language Film	Protégé	Won
14th Hong Kong Film Critics Society Award	Film of Merit	Protégé	Won
