= Kenneth Bi =

Hong Kong-born Canadian filmmaker

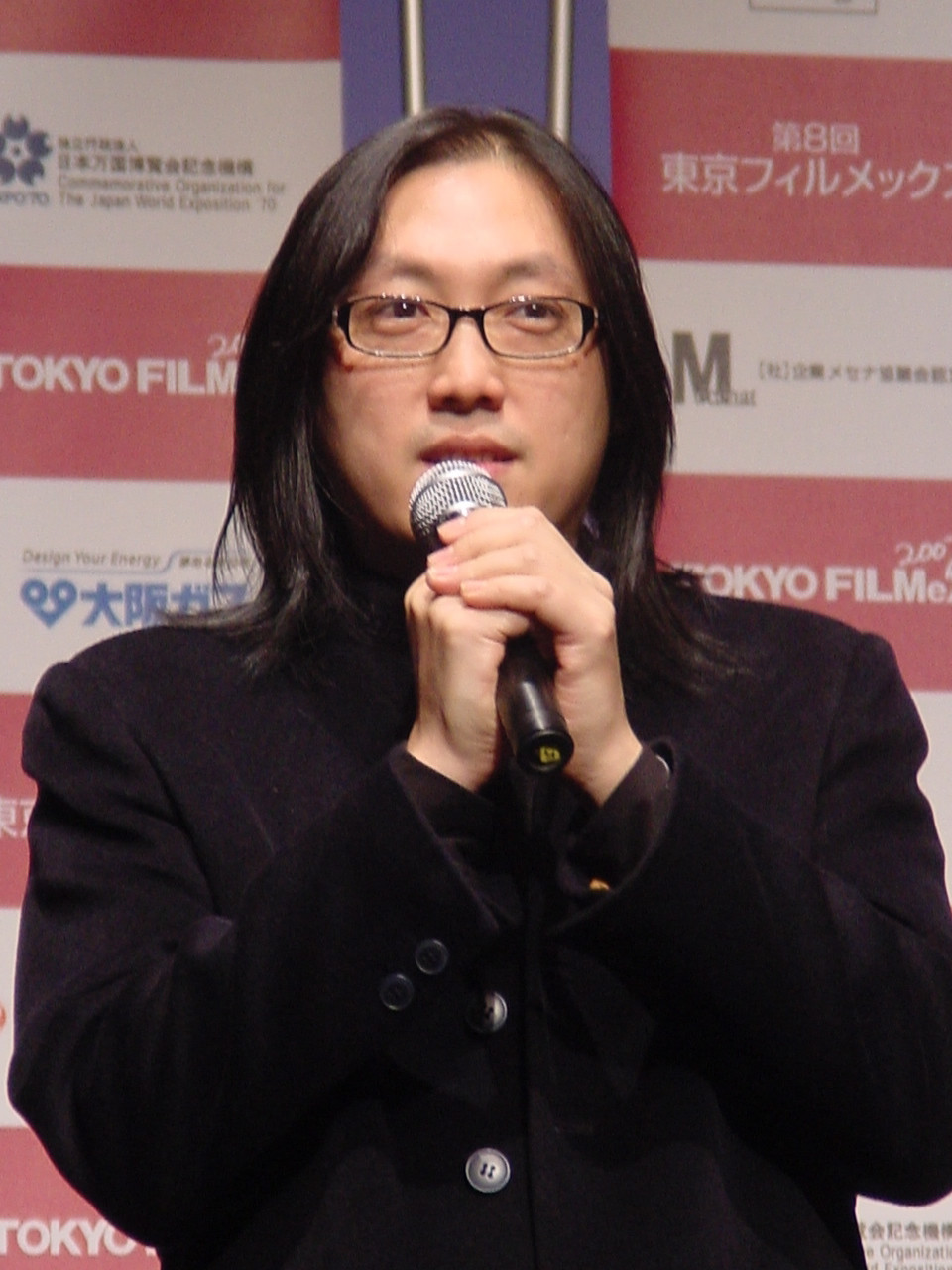
- Kenneth Bi at Tokyo Filmex 2007
- Born: March 4, 1967 (age 59); British Hong Kong
- Education: Brock University
- Occupation: filmmaker
- Parent(s): Chin Han (father); Ivy Ling Po (mother)

Chinese name
- Traditional Chinese: 畢國智
- Simplified Chinese: 毕国智
Transcriptions
Standard Mandarin
- Hanyu Pinyin: Bì Guózhì
Yue: Cantonese
- Jyutping: bat1 gwok3 zi3

Kenneth Bi (born March 4, 1967) is a Hong Kong-born Canadian filmmaker. He has written, directed, and acted in Canada and Hong Kong in numerous theatre and film productions.

== Biography ==
Kenneth Bi is the son of two movie stars from the Shaw Brothers Studio, Ivy Ling Po and Chin Han. They have both starred in numerous films and also had a cameo on Kenneth Bi's first film Rice Rhapsody. Kenneth Bi graduated with Honours in Theatre/Film from Brock University in St. Catharines, Ontario, Canada.

== Career ==
In 1992, he won a Special Merit Award in Toronto for his CBC-Radio Drama, Rice Krinkles.

Local director/producer Teddy Robin, enlisted Bi in the multi-talented capacities of actor, writer, and editor in his 1995 film Hong Kong Graffiti, and offered Bi his first chance at the big screen. In 1998, Bi line-produced Slow Fade for first time director Daniel Chan Fai which was selected into 1999 Berlin Film Festival. He garnered a second accolade in the same year with a Hong Kong Film Awards nomination for Best Original Film Score for Fruit Chan's The Longest Summer, which was also an official selection at the 1999 Berlin Film Festival.

Besides working on films, Bi also took time out in 2001 to write a series of eight children's short stories for the Worldwide Fund for Nature. Entitled Lolo's Big Adventures, the series depicts a young black-faced spoonbill's migratory journeys and is aimed at educating school children on the preservation of endangered animals.

In 2002, Bi took on triple duties as assistant director, actor and story co-creator on The Runaway Pistol, one of the most critically acclaimed local films. It premiered at the Hong Kong International Film Festival and went on to receive three award nominations – Best Feature Film, Best Screenplay, and Best Director at the 39th Golden Horse Awards.

Bi's script for Rice Rhapsody was awarded Outstanding Screenplay of 1999 by the Taiwan Government Information Office. It was subsequently selected by Pusan Promotion Plan as an Official Project for PPP 2000. The film was Bi's first 35mm feature film and it appeared in theatres in Hong Kong, Taiwan and Singapore. It stars Sylvia Chang, Martin Yan, Maggie Q and Mélanie Laurent.

Rice Rhapsody premiered at the largest film festival in Asia, Pusan International Film Festival in October 2004, and was selected into competition at the Tokyo International Film Festival in the same month. It was also nominated in the Best Actress and Best Original Film Score category at the Golden Horse Awards in December 2004 in Taiwan. It has also won "Best Actress" at Newport Beach International Film Festival and won "Best First Theatrical Feature" at Worldfest, Houston International Film Festival in 2005.

His second film as director, The Drummer was released in Hong Kong on October 11, 2007. It stars Jaycee Chan, Tony Leung Ka-Fai, Angelica Lee, Roy Cheung, Josie Ho, Kenneth Tsang, Eugenia Yuan and the internationally acclaimed Chinese Zen drumming group U-Theatre. The Drummer made its North American premiere in the World Cinema Dramatic Competition section at the 2008 Sundance Film Festival. It is the first film from Hong Kong and Taiwan to be selected for competition at Sundance.

== Filmography ==
- Rice Rhapsody (2004)
- The Drummer (2007)
- Girl$ (2010)
- Control (2013)
- Wish You Were Here (2019)

== Awards ==
- Best New Director (25th Hong Kong Film Awards) – Rice Rhapsody (2006)
- Outstanding Screenplay (Taiwan Government Information Office) – Rice Rhapsody (1999)
