= The Drummer (2007 film) =

2007 Hong Kong-Taiwanese film by Kenneth Bi

- Film poster
- Traditional Chinese: 戰‧鼓
- Simplified Chinese: 战‧鼓
- Hanyu Pinyin: Zhán. gǔ
- Jyutping: Zin3. gu2
- Directed by: Kenneth Bi
- Written by: Kenneth Bi
- Produced by: Rosa Li; Peggy Chiao; Thanassis Karathanos
- Starring: Jaycee Chan; Tony Leung Ka-fai; Angelica Lee; Roy Cheung; Josie Ho; Yumiko Cheng
- Cinematography: Sam Koa
- Edited by: Kenneth Bi; Isabel Meier
- Music by: Andre Matthias
- Production companies: Emperor Motion Pictures; Arc Light Films; Kenbiroli FilmsTwenty Twenty Vision Filmproduktion GmbH
- Distributed by: Emperor Motion Pictures
- Release dates: 11 October 2007 (Hong Kong); 12 October 2007 (Taiwan)
- Running time: 118 minutes
- Countries: Hong Kong; Taiwan
- Languages: Cantonese; Mandarin

The Drummer is a 2007 drama film written and directed by Kenneth Bi and starring Jaycee Chan, Tony Leung Ka-fai and Angelica Lee. A Hong Kong-Taiwanese co-production, it is Kenneth Bi's second film as a director.

The film was released in Hong Kong on 11 October 2007. It features the Chinese Zen drumming group, U-Theatre. The film is available in the United States on DVD from filmmovement.com.

== Summary ==
Sid, the spoiled son of a gangster (Kwan), is getting caught having a love affair with the girlfriend of a big gangster boss, who is also the boss of his father. To save the life of his son, Kwan sends him to off to Taiwan, where an uncle (Chiu) is watching over him. One day Sid discovers a temple with Zen buddhist practising drums. He joins them and learns important lessons about life.

== Cast and roles ==
- Jaycee Chan as Sid
- Tony Leung Ka-fai as Kwan
- Angelica Lee as Hong Dou
- Roy Cheung as Ah Chiu
- Josie Ho as Sina
- Kenneth Tsang as Stephen Ma
- Yumiko Cheng as Carmen
- Liu Ruo-yu as Lan Jie
- Huang Chih-chun as Sifu (Master)
- Eugenia Yuan as Kwan's wife
- Ken Lo as Long
- Glen Chin as Uncle Tak

== Awards and nominations ==
Awards and nominations
Ceremony	Category	Recipient	Outcome
27th Hong Kong Film Awards	Best Original Film Score	Andre Matthias	Nominated
27th Hong Kong Film Awards	Best Sound Design	Andrew Tuason, Kuo Li-chi	Nominated
44th Golden Horse Awards	Best Supporting Actor	Tony Leung Ka-fai	Won
44th Golden Horse Awards	Outstanding Taiwanese Film of the Year	The Drummer	Nominated
2007 Sundance Film Festival	Grand Jury Prize	Kenneth Bi	Nominated
12th Wine Country Film Festival	Best Feature Film	The Drummer	Won
12th Wine Country Film Festival	Best Actor	Jaycee Chan	Won
