= Samson Chiu =

Hong Kong film director, writer and columnist

Samson Chiu Leung-chun (趙良駿) is a Hong Kong–based film director, film writer and newspaper columnist. He is a member of the Hong Kong Directors' Guild.

== Filmography ==
- News Attack (1989) – director/writer, starring Andy Lau as a news photographer
- Rose (1992) – director, Maggie Cheung and Roy Cheung
- Yesteryou, Yesterme, Yesterday (1993) – director
- New Age of Living Together (1994) – director/writer
- Lost Boys in Wonderland (1995) – director/writer
- What a Wonderful World (1996) – starring Andy Lau
- When I Fall in Love... with Both (2000) – starring Fann Wong and Michelle Reis
- Golden Chicken (2002) – director/writer, starring Sandra Ng as a prostitute
- Golden Chicken 2 (2003) – director
- McDull, The Alumni (2006) – director
- Mr. Cinema (2007) - director

== See also ==
- Cinema of Hong Kong
