= Hong Kong Drama Awards =

Annual theatrical awards

Hong Kong Drama Awards 香港舞台劇獎
- Current: 33rd Hong Kong Drama Awards
- Awarded for: Achievements in Hong Kong theatre
- Location: Hong Kong
- Presented by: Hong Kong Federation of Drama Societies
- First award: 29 February 1992
- Final award: 28 April 2025
- Website: hkdramaawards.com

The Hong Kong Drama Awards are annual awards organized by Hong Kong Federation of Drama Societies since 1992. They are given to recognize the hard work and talent of different roles involved in the stage production, and are widely regarded as the most important theatre awards in Hong Kong. The awards are presented each year at a formal awards ceremony.

== Awards ==
A total of 26 regular awards are presented each year:

- Best Production [since 27th]
- Best Costume Design
- Best Makeup and Styling
- Best Lighting Design
- Best Stage Design
- Best Script
- Best Sound Design [since 9th]
- Best Original Music (Drama) [since 20th]
- Best Lyrics [since 28th]
- Outstanding Production of the Year [since 26th]

=== Tragedy/Drama ===
- Best Director
- Best Actor [since 2nd]
- Best Actress [since 2nd]
- Best Supporting Actor [since 2nd]
- Best Supporting Actress [since 2nd]

=== Comedy/Farce ===
- Best Director
- Best Actor [since 2nd]
- Best Actress [since 2nd]
- Best Supporting Actor [since 2nd]
- Best Supporting Actress [since 2nd]

=== Musical ===
- Best Original Music [since 28th]
- Best Actor [since 33rd]
- Best Actress [since 33rd]
- Best Supporting Actor [since 33rd]
- Best Supporting Actress [since 33rd]
- Best Choreography [since 33rd]

== Incidents ==
=== Funding cut over national security law concerns ===
In 2023, the Hong Kong Arts Development Council (HKADC) and the Leisure and Cultural Services Department (LCSD) withdrew funding and venue support for the annual Hong Kong Drama Awards, citing "inappropriate content" and that the 31st award ceremony sparked "different views in society". The HKADC said the decision, including a cut to the HK$441,700 grant, was made to minimize the risk of violating the national security law.

The 31st awards ceremony featured political cartoonist Zunzi and journalist Bao Choy, who had been arrested in 2020 for her reporting on the 2019 Yuen Long attacks but later acquitted. The hosts referenced "red lines" and "red bridges" onstage were deemed politically sensitive, and the council accused organizers of deviating from previous neutral practices.
