= Mr. Cinema =

2007 Hong Kong film by Samson Chiu

- Film poster
- Directed by: Samson Chiu
- Written by: Sze Yeung Ping; Scarlet Siu; Samson Chiu
- Produced by: Henry Fong Ping
- Starring: Anthony Wong; Teresa Mo; Ronald Cheng; Karen Mok
- Cinematography: Charlie Lam
- Edited by: Leung Kwok-Wing
- Music by: Leon Ko
- Production companies: Xi'an Film Studio; Southern Film
- Distributed by: Sil-Metropole Organisation
- Release date: 14 July 2007
- Running time: 110 minutes
- Country: Hong Kong
- Language: Cantonese

Mr. Cinema, also known as Call Me Left (Chinese: 老港正傳), is a 2007 Hong Kong film starring Anthony Wong, Teresa Mo, Ronald Cheng and Karen Mok.

== Plot ==
The story is about a pro-communist leftist Zhou Heung-Kong (Anthony Wong) who grew up in the pre-1997 British colony of Hong Kong starting from the 1950s. He lives with his wife Ying (Teresa Mo) who mostly raises the family by herself. Zhou has fantasies of going to Tiananmen Square, but has always been too poor to do so. They eventually find themselves in a HK transferred over to the People's Republic of China. In the end Zhou realised he sacrificed everything for the communist cause, and his family is left with nothing.

== Cast ==
- Anthony Wong as Zo Heung Kong
- Teresa Mo as Chan Sau-ying
- Ronald Cheng as Zo Chong
- Karen Mok as Luk Min
- Paw Hee-Ching as Lee Choi-ha
- John Shum as Luk Yau

== Production note ==
The film has been criticised for its "selective history" for covering a long period of HK's history, but does not mention the 1989 Tiananmen Square Protests. The Hong Kong 1967 Leftist Riots was only covered briefly, and China's support for its HK-based loyalists is never addressed. The name of Anthony Wong's character Zhou Heung Kong is pronounced similar to "Left(ist) Hong Kong".

== Critical reception ==
The film received mixed reviews. One of them, by Vivienne Chow of Muse magazine, applauded Chiu for 'initiating the idea of telling a Hong Kong story from the perspective of the leftists for the first time,' but deemed the movie 'ultimately overambitious'.

== Awards and nominations ==
Awards	Category	Name	Result
Golden Rooster Awards	Best Supporting Actress	Karen Mok	Nominated
27th Hong Kong Film Awards	Best Supporting Actress	Karen Mok	Nominated
27th Hong Kong Film Awards	Best Supporting Actor	Ronald Cheng	Nominated
27th Hong Kong Film Awards	Best Actress	Teresa Mo	Nominated
27th Hong Kong Film Awards	Best Original Film Song	《Starry Night with my Heart》	Nominated
2007 Shanghai International Film Festival	Best Potential Hit Movie Song	《Starry Night with my Heart》	Won
Huabiao Awards	outstanding co-production Film		Won
Hong Kong Film Critics Society Award	Best Actress	Teresa Mo	Nominated
Hong Kong Film Critics Society Award	Best Actor	Anthony Wong	Nominated

== See also ==
- The True Story of Ah Q
