= Leon Ko =

Leon Ko Sai-tseung
- 高世章
- Education: Northwestern University, New York University
- Occupation: Composer
- Notable work: The Good Person of Szechwan - The Passage Beyond - The Impossible Trial - Perhaps Love - The Warlords - Monster Hunt -Time in a Bottle

Leon Ko Sai-tseung (Chinese: 高世章; pinyin: Gāo Shìzhāng) is a composer for musical theatre and films. He won a Richard Rodgers Development Award, a Golden Horse Award and numerous musical awards. In 2025, he received the Award for Outstanding Contribution to the Arts from the Hong Kong Arts Development Council.

Ko comes from a renowned family of performing artists. His mother, Lucilla You Min (尤敏), was a famous actress in post-war Hong Kong Mandarin cinema and won "Best Actress" at the 1st Annual Golden Horse Awards and two consecutive Asian Film Festivals. His grandfather, Bak Yuk Tong (白玉堂), was a famous Cantonese opera artist, known as one of the Four Super Stars (四大天王).

== Personal life ==
Ko received a master’s in Musical Theatre Writing at New York University's Tisch School of the Arts. His musical Heading East, with book and lyrics by Robert Lee, won the 2001 Richard Rodgers Development Award and was restaged in New York in 2010 in the form of a concert presentation. His works have been performed at Carnegie Hall, as well as on Public Broadcasting Service (PBS), where he wrote songs for the children series The Puzzle Place.

== Career ==
Ko won ten Best Score awards for his Cantonese musicals The Good Person of Szechwan (四川好人), The Legend of the White Snake (白蛇新傳), Field of Dreams (頂頭鎚), The Passage Beyond (一屋寶貝), Sing Out (奮青樂與路), The Woman in Kenzo (穿Kenzo的女人) and The Impossible Trial (大狀王) as well as his a cappella theatre piece Our Immortal Cantata (大殉情) in the 2003, 2006, 2009, 2010, 2012, 2017, 2018, 2022 and 2023 Hong Kong Drama Awards. For the movie Perhaps Love (如果·愛), he received a Golden Horse Award for Best Original Film Song, a CASH Golden Sail Music Award for Best Alternative Composition as well as a Hong Kong Film Award, an Asia-Pacific Film Festival Award and a Golden Bauhinia Award for Best Film Score. In 2013, he received a Hong Kong Film Award for Best Original Film Song for the movie The Last Tycoon (大上海). In 2019, he received an ASCAP Screen Music Award for the movie Monster Hunt 2 (捉妖記2). He was nominated for a Golden Horse Award and a Hong Kong Film Award in 2008 for the movie The Warlords (投名狀).

He was the musical director of Hong Kong pop legend Jacky Cheung’s 2004 musical revival world tour of Snow.Wolf.Lake (雪狼湖). He worked with Jacky again on The Year of Jacky Cheung World Tour 07, penning a 30-minute musical for the concert. In 2009, he wrote an opening number and a mini-musical finale for Liza Wang's musical Liza the Diva (真係阿姐─汪明荃).

He also took part in the revitalisation of Cantonese opera. In 2006, he wrote a new opening song and incidental music for Princess Changping (帝女花) presented by Yam Kim Fai & Pak Suet Sin Charitable Foundation (任白慈善基金) and performed by Chor Fung Ming Troupe (雛鳳鳴劇團). In 2012, he wrote an opening number for Dream of the Red Chamber (紅樓夢) performed by Connie Chan and Jian Wen Duan. In 2014, he wrote incidental music for Reincarnation of the Red Plum Blossoms (再世紅梅記) presented by Yam Pak Foundation. In 2017, he wrote a new opening song and incidental music for Shade of Butterfly and Red Pear Blossom (蝶影紅梨記) presented by Yam Pak Foundation.

Other works include the scores to:

- the movies Shed Skin Papa (脫皮爸爸), Monster Hunt (捉妖記), Insanity (暴瘋語), Dearest (親愛的), That Demon Within (魔警), The Great Magician (大魔術師) and Mr. Cinema (老港正傳);
- the stage musicals Sing High (我要高8度) for Macao Cultural Centre’s 15th Anniversary celebrations, Angel Falls (夢傳說) for Hong Kong Dance and I Am What I Am (雄師少年）for Guangzhou Opera House;
- the stage plays Tonnochy (杜老誌) for Emperor Entertainment and Cross-mopolitan (咖喱盆菜釀薯條) for Chung Ying Theatre;
- the transcultural music theatre The Liaisons (情話紫釵) for the 2010 Hong Kong Arts Festival and Hong Kong's participation in Expo 2010 Shanghai; and
- the stage adaptation of the movie Please Don't Eat the Daisies for the New York stage.

In 2011, his first London musical Takeaway (also the first major British Chinese musical) premiered at Theatre Royal Stratford East.

Ko has also performed in public himself. In 2009, he orchestrated and performed a medley of five songs from some of his own musicals/plays at the 2009 Hong Kong Drama Awards in celebration of the 25th Anniversary of the Hong Kong Federation of Drama Societies. Later that year, he orchestrated and performed a medley of two songs (one of which was tailor-made for the poem Looking up at the Starry Sky (仰望星空) written by the PRC Premier Wen Jiabao) at the Cultural Show in Celebration of the 60th Anniversary of the Founding of the People's Republic of China (香港同胞慶祝中華人民共和國成立六十週年文藝晚會) together with Jacky Cheung, Yao Jue and Yang Peiyi. From 2010 to 2024, he co-hosted The Shaw Prize Award Presentation Ceremony. In 2018, he staged a concert titled "The Amazing Filmphony" with the Hong Kong Sinfonietta. The concert consisted of his film scores and songs, of which he sang three of them on stage.

Aside from music, Ko held an antique perfume bottle exhibition entitled Time in a Bottle (尋香記) at IFC Mall in 2010. To give the exhibition a theatrical context, he divided it into 13 "scenes" using his collection of perfume bottles to tell the story of a search for true love. In 2024, he curated another edition of the theatrical exhibition entitled Time in a Bottle (琉璃之歌), held in The Box at Freespace in the West Kowloon Cultural District and Ishikawa Ongakudo in Kanazawa, Japan. This exhibition intertwines theatre, music, visual art, and scent to narrate the story of human existence, exploring themes of creation, prosperity, war, revival, and death through 12 theatrical scenes.

Ko was a council member of the Hong Kong Academy for Performing Arts from 2015 to 2021 and was a council member of Hong Kong Arts Development Council from 2011 to 2016.
