= Peter Chan =

Hong Kong filmmaker (born 1962)

- Chan in 2026
- Born: 28 November 1962 (age 63); British Hong Kong
- Occupations: Film director; film producer
- Partner: Sandra Ng (1996–present)
- Children: Jilian Chan (daughter)
- Awards: Hong Kong Film Awards – Best Director; 1997 Comrades, Almost A Love Story; 2008 The Warlords; Best Film; 1997 Comrades, Almost A Love Story; 2008 The Warlords; 2010 Bodyguards and Assassins Golden Bauhinia Awards – Best Director; 1996 Comrades, Almost A Love Story Hong Kong Film Critics Society Awards – Best Director; 1996 Comrades, Almost A Love Story; 2002 Three Golden Horse Awards – Best Director; 1996 Comrades, Almost A Love Story; 2005 Perhaps Love; 2008 The Warlords

Chinese name
- Traditional Chinese: 陳可辛
- Simplified Chinese: 陈可辛
Transcriptions
Standard Mandarin
- Hanyu Pinyin: Chén Kěxīn
Yue: Cantonese
- Jyutping: can4 ho2 san1

Peter Ho-sun Chan (simplified Chinese: 陈可辛; traditional Chinese: 陳可辛; pinyin: Chén Kěxīn; Jyutping: can4 ho2 san1, born 28 November 1962), also known as Peter Chan, is a Hong Kong-born filmmaker. Known for directing films that span a wide range of genres, including romantic comedies, dramas, and historical epics, he is widely regarded as one of the most prominent filmmakers in Chinese cinema. Chan was the first director to win Best Director awards at the Hong Kong Film Awards, the Golden Horse Awards, and the China Golden Rooster Awards.

Chan began his career in the film industry in the 1980s, working as an assistant director and producer on films for prominent directors such as John Woo and Jackie Chan. He made his directorial debut with Alan and Eric: Between Hello and Goodbye (1991). Among his notable films are He's a Woman, She's a Man (1994), Comrades: Almost a Love Story (1996), Perhaps Love (2005), The Warlords (2007), Dragon (2011), American Dreams in China (2013), Dearest (2014), Leap (2020), and She's Got No Name (2025).

In addition to his directorial success, Chan has also made significant contributions as a producer and entrepreneur. He co-founded Applause Pictures in 2000, a production company dedicated to creating high-quality films that appeal to both Asian and international audiences. In 2009, Chan founded We Pictures, another production company that has focused on bringing Chinese stories to a global audience and continues to produce influential and acclaimed works. Chan's notable producing works include The Eye Series, Protégé (2007), Bodyguards and Assassins (2009) and Soul Mate (2016).

== Early life ==
Chan was born in British Hong Kong to Chinese parents. His father, Chan Tung Man, was a writer-director and a columnist. At the age of 11, Chan moved with his family to Thailand, where he grew up in Bangkok's international Chinese community and became fluent in Thai.

He later attended film school at UCLA before returning to Hong Kong in 1983 for a summer internship in the film industry, which marked the beginning of his career in filmmaking.

== Career ==
=== Early career and breakthrough (1980s–1990s) ===
Peter Chan began his film career in the 1980s, serving as second assistant director, translator, and producer on John Woo's Heroes Shed No Tears (1986), set in Thailand. He then worked as a location manager on three Jackie Chan films: Wheels on Meals (1984), The Protector (1985), and Armour of God (1986), all shot overseas. In 1989, he joined Impact Films as a producer, guiding projects such as Curry and Pepper (1990) to completion.

Chan made his directorial debut with Alan and Eric: Between Hello and Goodbye in 1991, which won Best Film at the Hong Kong Film Directors' Guild and Best Actor at the Hong Kong Film Awards for Eric Tsang. This period also saw him co-founding the United Filmmakers Organization (UFO) in the early 1990s, which produced several box-office hits, including his own He Ain't Heavy, He's My Father (1993), Tom, Dick and Hairy (1993), He's a Woman, She's a Man (1994), and the internationally acclaimed Comrades, Almost a Love Story (1997) starring Maggie Cheung and Leon Lai. This film, often hailed as one of the greatest Chinese-language films ever made, catapulted Chan into international prominence and set the tone for his career as a director, producer and tireless advocate of the Chinese-language film industry.

=== Hollywood and pan-Asian collaborations (late 1990s–2000s) ===
In the late 1990s, Chan directed The Love Letter, a Hollywood film starring Kate Capshaw, Ellen DeGeneres, and Tom Selleck. In 2000, he co-founded Applause Pictures, where he spearheaded a drive to make Pan-Asian films for the region’s audiences, resulting in hits such as Jan Dara by Thailand's Nonzee Nimibutr, One Fine Spring Day South Korea's Hur Jin-ho, The Eye by Danny and Oxide Pang and cinematographer Christopher Doyle, The Eye sequels and its US remake. It also fostered collaborations with directors such as Park Chan-wook and Takashi Miike.

Since the mid-2000s, Chan has predominantly worked in mainland China, capitalizing on the rapid expansion of its film industry. His 2005 musical film Perhaps Love, a Hong Kong-mainland China co-production, closed the Venice Film Festival and was Hong Kong's entry for the Academy Awards' Best Foreign Film category. Perhaps Love became one of the top-grossing films of the year in China, Hong Kong, and Taiwan, winning a record 29 awards. Chan also directed The Warlords (2007) and produced Derek Yee's Protégé (2007), both of which were the highest-grossing Hong Kong-China co-productions of the year. The Warlords won 8 Hong Kong Film Awards and 3 Golden Horse Awards, including Best Director and Best Feature Film.

=== Continued success and advocacy (2010s–present) ===
In 2009, Chan founded We Pictures, a production company aimed at supporting, producing and distributing films from a range of Chinese artists. That same year, he produced Teddy Chan's Bodyguards and Assassins, which won eight Hong Kong Film Awards, including Best Film. Chan's reputation was solidified when he was voted "the most valuable filmmaker" in a 2010 survey by the Hong Kong Trade Development Council.

Chan's 2011 martial arts film Dragon premiered at the Cannes Film Festival, the only Chinese-language film in that year's selection. Time Magazine named Wu Xia one of the top ten films of 2012. In 2020, his drama Leap, about the Chinese women's volleyball Olympic team, represented Mainland China and showcased his ability to navigate various genres.

In 2022, Chan launched the production company Changin' Pictures to create streaming content.

Chan’s new film, She’s Got No Name (2024), marks his second time in official selection at the Cannes Film Festival after Dragon.

== Personal life ==
Chan has a daughter, Jilian Chan (born in 2006), with Hong Kong actress Sandra Ng, although the two have no intention of getting married.

== Filmography ==
Year	Title	Director	Producer	Ref.
1986	Heroes Shed No Tears	No	Yes	
1989	News Attack	No	Yes	
1990	Whampoa Blues	No	Yes	
1990	Curry and Pepper	No	Yes	
1991	Alan and Eric: Between Hello and Goodbye	Yes	Yes	
1991	Yesteryou, Yesterme, Yesterday	No	Yes	
1992	The Days of Being Dumb	No	Yes	
1993	He Ain't Heavy, He's My Father	Yes	Yes	
1993	Tom, Dick and Hairy	Yes	No	
1994	He's a Woman, She's a Man	Yes	Yes	
1994	Over The Rainbow, Under The Skirt	No	Yes	
1994	Twenty Something	No	Yes	
1995	Happy Hour	No	Yes	
1996	The Age of Miracles	Yes	Yes	
1996	Who's The Woman, Who's The Man	Yes	Yes	
1996	Comrades, Almost A Love Story	Yes	Yes	
1999	The Love Letter	Yes	No	
2000	Twelve Nights	No	Yes	
2001	Jan Dara	No	Yes	
2001	One Fine Spring Day	No	Yes	
2002	The Eye	No	Yes	
2002	Three (segment Going Home)	Yes	Yes	
2002	Golden Chicken	No	Yes	
2003	Project 1:99 (short film)	Yes	No	
2003	Golden Chicken 2	No	Yes	
2004	The Eye 2	No	Yes	
2004	Three...Extremes	No	Yes	
2005	Perhaps Love	Yes	Yes	
2005	The Eye 10	No	Yes	
2007	Protégé	No	Yes	
2007	The Warlords	Yes	Yes	
2009	Bodyguards and Assassins	No	Yes	
2011	Mr. and Mrs. Incredible	No	Yes	
2011	Dragon	Yes	Yes	
2012	The Guillotines	No	Yes	
2013	American Dreams in China	Yes	Yes	
2014	Dearest	Yes	No	
2014	The Truth About Beauty	No	Yes	
2016	Soul Mate	No	Yes	
2017	This Is Not What I Expected	No	Yes	
2018	Last Letter	No	Yes	
2020	Leap	Yes	No	
2021	Coffee or Tea	No	Yes	
2023	Tale of the Night	No	Yes	
2024	She's Got No Name	Yes	Yes	
2026	The Road Not Taken	Yes	Yes	
TBA	Li Na: My Life	Yes	Yes	

Executive producer

- The Eye (2008)
- Better Days (2019)

Cameos

- Millionaires Express (1986)
- Couples, Couples, Couples (1988)
- Twin Dragons (1992)
- C'est la vie, mon chéri (1993)
