= Peter Kam =

Hong Kong composer

- 金培達
- Born: August 23, 1961 (age 65); Hong Kong
- Occupations: Musician, composer

Peter Kam Pui-Tat (Chinese: 金培達; born August 23, 1961) is a music composer for Hong Kong films including The Warlords, Bodyguards and Assassins, Dragon and Isabella.

Kam is an eight-time winner at the Hong Kong Film Awards.

== Partial filmography ==
- Big Bullet (1996)
- Full Alert (1997)
- Fly Me to Polaris (1999)
- Gen-Y Cops (2000)
- The Accidental Spy (2001)
- Three (2002)
- Why Me, Sweetie?! (2003)
- Isabella (2006)
- Protege (2007)
- The Warlords (2007)
- Bodyguards and Assassins (2009)
- Shinjuku Incident (2009)
- Detective Dee and the Mystery of the Phantom Flame (2010)
- Dragon (2011)
- Legend of a Rabbit (2011)
- Cold War (2012)
- American Dreams in China (2013)
- Out of Inferno (2013)
- Kung Fu Jungle (2014)
- The White Haired Witch of Lunar Kingdom (2014)
- Helios (2015)
- Sword Master (2016)
- Love Off the Cuff (2017)
- Europe Raiders (2018)
- Double World (2019)
- I'm Livin' It (2020)
- Septet: The Story of Hong Kong (2022)
