= Chung Ying Theatre Company =

Hong Kong theatre company

- 中英劇團
- Formation: 1979
- Type: Theatre group
- Location: Hong Kong
- Artistic director: Dominic Cheung Ho-kin
- Website: www.chungying.com/en/

Chung Ying Theatre Company (Chinese: 中英劇團) was founded in 1979 and is one of Hong Kong's longest-established professional theatre companies. The company is committed to promoting original local productions and bilingual productions in both Chinese and English.

== History ==
Originally formed as a subsidiary of the British Council in 1979, the company registered as an independent non-profit organization in 1982. It is recognized as the first professional theatre company in Hong Kong to introduce the Theatre-in-Education (TiE) program to the region.

In the mid-1980s, its socially conscious production I Am Hong Kong (1985) gained widespread attention for exploring themes of local identity and belonging during the politically sensitive period following the introduction of election to the Legislative Council of Hong Kong and the signing of the Sino-British Joint Declaration in 1984. The production is widely regarded as a milestone in the development of Hong Kong theatre.

In 1993, Ko Tin Lung was appointed as the company's first Chinese Artistic Director. Over the decades, the company has nurtured numerous playwrights, directors, and actors, and has actively promoted community and educational theatre.

In 2018, Chung Ying Theatre Company established Hong Kong's first theatre archive to preserve performing arts heritage, housing scripts, photos, playbills, manuscripts, and other materials, while also documents oral history.

== Gallery ==
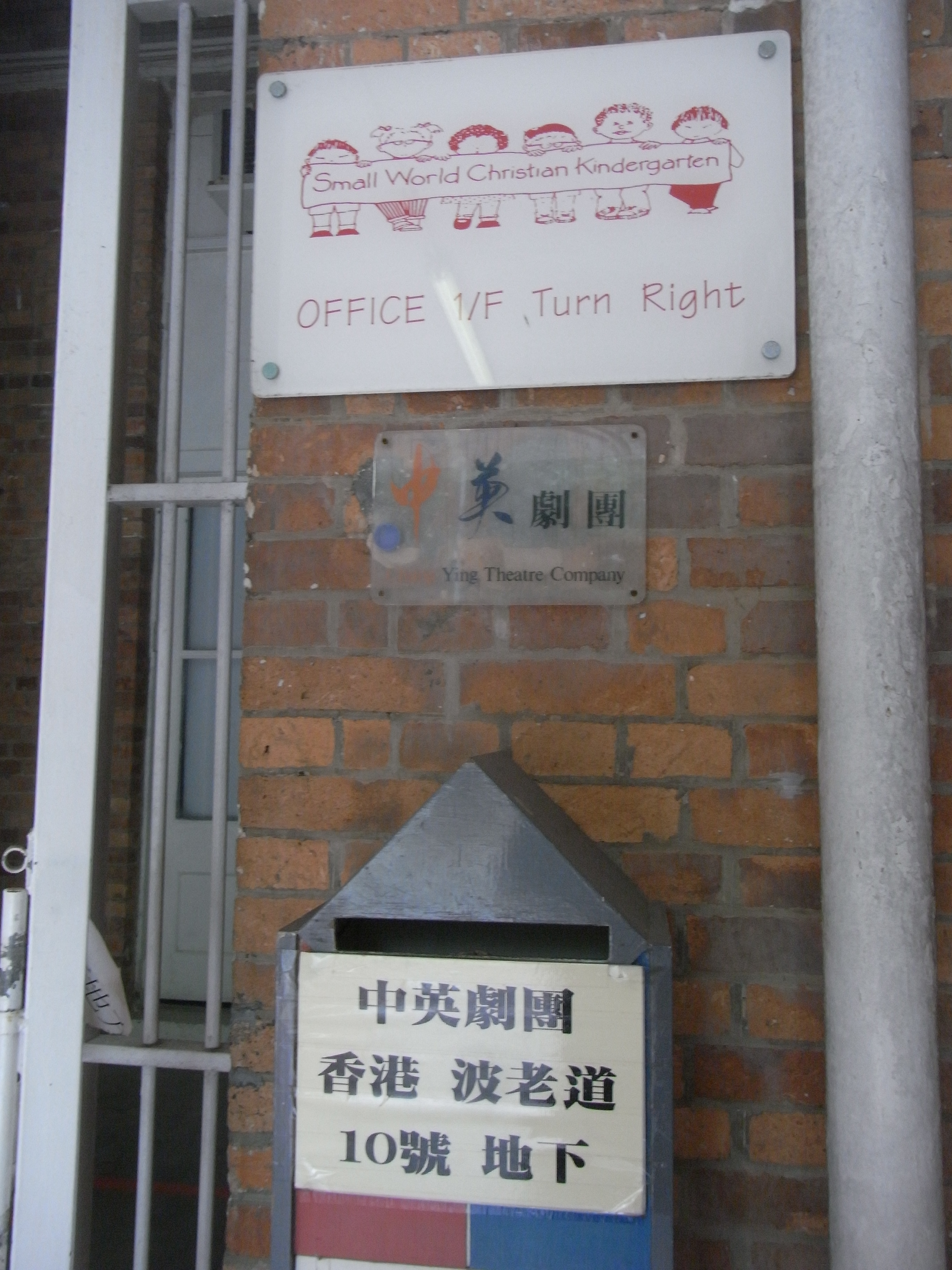
Front door taken in 2011

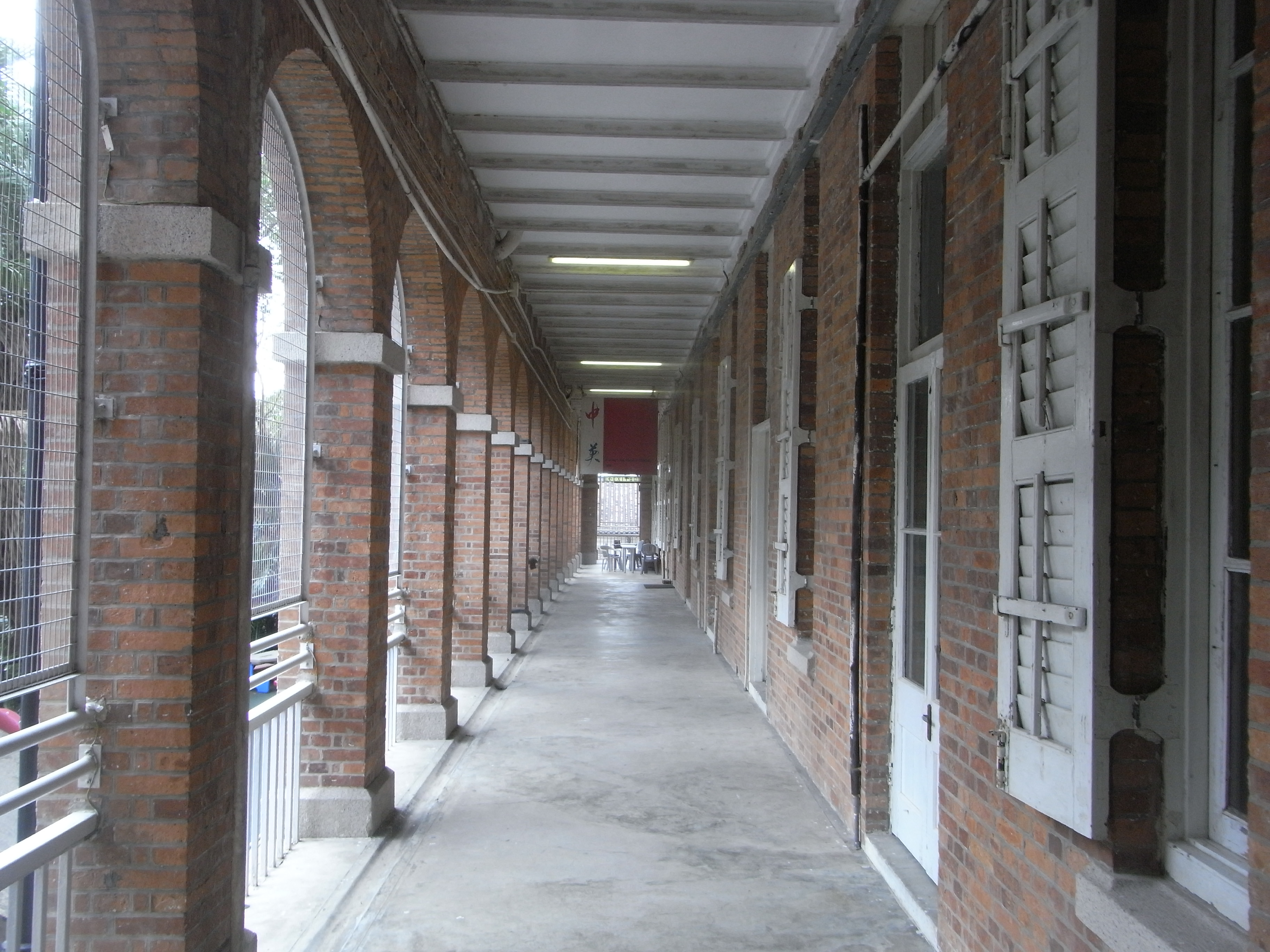
Corridor taken in 2011
