= Hong Kong Drama Award for Best Director (Comedy/Farce) =

Annual theatrical award

Hong Kong Drama Award for Best Director (Comedy/Farce) is presented by the Hong Kong Federation of Drama Societies at the Hong Kong Drama Awards ceremony, recognizing the most outstanding direction in a comedy or farce production of the year.

== Past winners ==
Year	Name	Title	Theatre company/production	Ref.
1992 (1st)	Cheung Tat-ming	Far Way Home 客鄉途情遠	Chung Ying Theatre Company	
1992 (1st)	Jeffrey Ho	Love In The Marketplace 擺檔俏冤家	Wan Chai Theatre	
1992 (1st)	Roy Szeto	Luv 飛越愛河橋	Actors' Family	
1993 (2nd)	Chung King-fai	A Foxy Tale 聊齋新誌	Hong Kong Repertory Theatre	
1993 (2nd)	Daniel Yang	The marriage of Figaro 費加羅的婚禮	Hong Kong Repertory Theatre	
1993 (2nd)	James Mark	Fools 烏龍鎮	High Noon Production Company	
1994 (3rd)	Dominic Cheung Ho-kin	Move Over Mrs Markham 撞板風流 (Note: later versions titled 女上男下"女上男下" (PDF). 2011.)	High Noon Production Company	
1994 (3rd)	Daniel Yang	Other People's Money 他人的錢	Hong Kong Repertory Theatre	
1994 (3rd)	Tang Shu-wing	The Affair of the Rue de Lourcine 鴨蛋街烏龍殺人事件	Horizonte	
1994 (3rd)	Chung King-fai	Driving Miss Daisy 山水喜相逢	Exploration Theatre	
1995 (4th)	Ko Tin-lung	The School & I 芳草校園	Chung Ying Theatre Company	
1995 (4th)	Chung King-fai and Sammy Lam Lap-sam	Guys and dolls 紅男綠女	Hong Kong Academy for Performing Arts	
1995 (4th)	Anthony Chan Kam-kuen	You Can't Take It with You 不搶錢家族	Hong Kong Repertory Theatre	
1996 (5th)	Fredric Mao	Red Room, White Room, Black Room 紅房間、白房間、黑房間	Hong Kong Repertory Theatre	
1996 (5th)	Jeffrey Ho	One Man, Two Guvnors 一僕二主	Hong Kong Repertory Theatre	
1996 (5th)	Jacob Yu Chun-kau	Laughter on the 23rd Floor 廿三樓‧搞笑友	Horizonte	
1996 (5th)	Raymond To	Forever Yours 人生唯願多知己	Chung Ying Theatre Company	
1997 (6th)	May Fu Yuet-mai	Lost in Yonkers 一起走過嫲嫲煩煩的日子	Hong Kong Federation of Drama Societies	
1997 (6th)	Sammy Lam Lap-sam	God's Favourite 非常天試	Exploration Theatre	
1997 (6th)	Sammy Lam Lap-sam and Desmond Tang Wai-kit	Damn Yankees 棒球狂想曲	Hong Kong Academy for Performing Arts	
1998 (7th)	Lee Chun-chow	The Professional 專業社團	Chung Ying Theatre Company	
1998 (7th)	Fredric Mao	Le Médecin malgré lui 屈打成醫	Hong Kong Academy for Performing Arts	
1998 (7th)	Anthony Chan Kam-kuen	1941 一九四一	Hong Kong Academy for Performing Arts	
1999 (8th)	James Mark	The Bureaucrats 官場現形記	Chung Ying Theatre Company	
1999 (8th)	Jeffrey Ho	The Imaginary Invalid 戇病夫妙計試真情 (Note: The official Chinese titles are 《無病呻吟》and《誰真的愛我？》)	Hong Kong Repertory Theatre	
1999 (8th)	Desmond Tang Wai-kit	Don't Dress For Dinner 瘋狂夜宴搞偷情	Hong Kong Federation of Drama Societies	
2000 (9th)	Lee Chun-chow	Aladdin 丁燈	Chung Ying Theatre Company	
2000 (9th)	Anthony Chan Kam-kuen	The Quick Change Room 轉得快好世界	Chung Ying Theatre Company	
2000 (9th)	Dominic Cheung Ho-kin	Art 望框框的男人	Theatre Space	
2001 (10th)	Jeffrey Ho	Let Me Love Once 讓我愛一次	Hong Kong Repertory Theatre	
2001 (10th)	Daniel Yang	A Midsummer Night's Dream 仲夏夜之夢	Hong Kong Repertory Theatre	
2001 (10th)	Lee Chun-chow	Sylvia 點解手牽狗	Chung Ying Theatre Company	
2002 (11th)	Weigo Lee Kwok-wai	Spiders in Meditation 在天台上冥想的蜘蛛	Prospects Theatre	
2002 (11th)	Jeffrey Ho	Hong Kong For Sure! 香港一定得！	Hong Kong Repertory Theatre	
2002 (11th)	Victor Pang and Mandy Yiu Yun-man	Under Construction 蛋散與豬扒 (Note: lit. 'Egg Twists and Pork Chops ')	Actors' Family	
2003 (12th)	Poon Wai-sum	Of Fire And Fireworks 香港煙花燦爛 also known as 港燦 (Note: lit. 'Hong Kong's Dazzling Fireworks a.k.a. Gongcaan ')	Theatre Ensemble and Prospects Theatre	
2003 (12th)	Lee Chun-chow	Little Shop of Horrors 花樣獠牙	Hong Kong Repertory Theatre	
2003 (12th)	Luther Fung	On Golden Pond 金池塘	Hong Kong Federation of Drama Societies	
2004 (13th)	Chan Suk-yi	Oldsters on Fire 老馬有火	Wan Chai Theatre	
2004 (13th)	Jeffrey Ho	Haunted Haunted Little Star 長髮幽靈	Hong Kong Repertory Theatre	
2004 (13th)	Jim Chim and Olivia Yan	Sure Win 單人匹馬詹瑞文	Theatre Ensemble	
2005 (14th)	Henry Fong	Funny Money 喜尾注	Hong Kong Federation of Drama Societies	
2005 (14th)	Alvin Wong Chi-lung and Joey Leung	Queer Show 攣到爆	W Theatre	
2005 (14th)	Fredric Mao and Roy Szeto	A Small Family Business 家庭作孽	Hong Kong Repertory Theatre	
2005 (14th)	Poon Wai-sum	Of Minds and No-mind 虎鶴雙形 (Note: lit. 'Tiger Crane Paired Form ')	Theatre Ensemble and Prospects Theatre	
2006 (15th)	Tony Wong Lung-pun and Pichead Amornsomboon	Two of Us 二人前•2人後	2 On Stage	
2006 (15th)	Chan Chu-hei	I Love You, You're Perfect, Now Change! 你咪理，我愛你！死未？	Windmill Grass Theatre	
2006 (15th)	May Fu Yuet-mai	February 14; 2月14	Hong Kong Repertory Theatre	
2007 (16th)	Weigo Lee Kwok-wai	The Massage King 大汗推拿	Prospects Theatre	
2007 (16th)	Henry Fong	The Last Bet of My Dead Aunt 頭注香	Chung Ying Theatre Company	
2007 (16th)	Szeto Wai-kin	Xi Nai On Rock 愈笨愈開心	Hong Kong Repertory Theatre	
2008 (17th)	Weigo Lee Kwok-wai	Art 藝術	Hong Kong Repertory Theatre	
2008 (17th)	Weigo Lee Kwok-wai	Trumpets and Raspberries 奪面雙蟲	Cinematic Theatre	
2008 (17th)	Roy Szeto and Alvin Wong	Once in a Lifetime 一期一會	W Theatre	
2008 (17th)	Chan Suk-yi	Journey to the West 取西經	Hong Kong Academy for Performing Arts	
2009 (18th)	May Fu Yuet-mai	Love You Forever 我愛阿愛 (Note: lit. 'I Love A-Ai ')	Hong Kong Repertory Theatre	
2009 (18th)	Jacob Yu Chun-kau and Joey Leung	A Mad World, My Masters 大顛世界	Hong Kong Federation of Drama Societies	
2009 (18th)	Jeffrey Ho and Lee Wai-cheung	To Dream the Impossible Dream 秒速18米	Wan Chai Theatre	
2009 (18th)	Tang Shu-wing	Le Dindon 一拍兩散偷錯情	Hong Kong Academy for Performing Arts	
2010 (19th)	Desmond Tang Wai-kit	Academy of Laughter 笑之大學	The Nonsensemakers	
2010 (19th)	Anthony Chan Kam-kuen	A Flea in Her Ear 橫衝直撞偷錯情	Hong Kong Repertory Theatre	
2010 (19th)	Chung King-fai and Ko Tin-lung	A Funny Thing Happened on the Way to the Forum 搶奪芳心喜自由	Chung Ying Theatre Company	
2011 (20th)	Roy Szeto	Le Dieu du carnage 豆泥戰爭	Hong Kong Repertory Theatre	
2011 (20th)	Roy Szeto	Communicating Doors; 2029追殺1989	Hong Kong Repertory Theatre	
2011 (20th)	Jacob Yu Chun-kau	Le Dieu du carnage 喜靈州……分享夜	Theatre Space	
2011 (20th)	Poon Wai-sum	Peacock Man & Durian Woman 孔雀男與榴槤女	Windmill Grass Theatre	
2012 (21st)	Roy Szeto	Shed Skin 脫皮爸爸	Hong Kong Repertory Theatre	
2012 (21st)	Henry Fong	Caught in the Net 花心大丈夫2	Hong Kong Federation of Drama Societies	
2012 (21st)	Terence Sin Chun-tung	Boeing-Boeing 波音情人	Actors' Square	
2013 (22nd)	Chan Chu-hei	The Black and the Blue of a Man 李逵的藍與黑	Hong Kong Academy for Performing Arts	
2013 (22nd)	Tony Wong Lung-pun	The Scholar and the Executioner 秀才與劊子手	Hong Kong Academy for Performing Arts	
2013 (22nd)	Weigo Lee Kwok-wai	Occupy C.E.O. 佔領凸手辦	Amity Drama Club	
2014 (23rd)	Chan Ping-chiu	Der goldene Drache 金龍	On & On Theatre Workshop	
2014 (23rd)	Tony Wong Lung-pun	The 39 Steps 搏命兩頭騰	Chung Ying Theatre Company	
2014 (23rd)	Edmond Lo Chi-sun	The Big Big Day 大龍鳯	Chung Ying Theatre Company	
2015 (24th)	Chan Ping-chiu	Postcolonial God of Food 後殖民食神之歌	On & On Theatre Workshop	
2015 (24th)	Rensen Chan Man-kong	Academy of Laughter 笑の大学	The Nonsensemakers	
2015 (24th)	Chan Suk-yi and Cecilia Ng Kit-yan	Gap Life 人生罅隙	Whole Theatre	
2015 (24th)	Edmond Lo Chi-sun	Go Go Ghost 過戶陰陽眼	Chung Ying Theatre Company	
2016 (25th)	Chan Suk-yi	An Angel Dumped into New City 天使撻落新‧都城	Whole Theatre and Artocrite Theatre	
2016 (25th)	Kenson Chan Wing-chuen	title of show Show名係最難諗㗎！	Art Peak	
2016 (25th)	Tony Wong Lung-pun	The Government Inspector 戇大人	Chung Ying Theatre Company	
2017 (26th)	Fong Chun-kit	The Truth from Liar 竹林深處強姦	Artocrite Theatre	
2017 (26th)	Chan Suk-yi	Spring Fever Hotel 2016 嬉春酒店2016	Dharma Workshop	
2017 (26th)	Victor Pang	A Midsummer Night's Dream 仲夏夜之夢	Actors' Family	
2017 (26th)	Daniel Yang	Whose Wife is it Anyway? 誰家老婆上錯床	Hong Kong Repertory Theatre	
2018 (27th)	Fong Chun-kit	Sing Out 奮青樂與路 (Note: lit. 'The path of joyful and striving youth')	Delia Memorial School (Hip Wo), Pui Ching Middle School, HHCKLA Buddhist Ching Kok Secondary School, Ebenezer School & Home for the Visually Impaired	
2018 (27th)	Lee Chun-chow	The Truth 謊言	Project Roundabout	
2018 (27th)	Chan Suk-yi	An Accidental Rainbow 在牛池灣轉角遇上彩虹	Radix Troupe	
2019 (28th)	Wong Chun-ho	The Resistible Rise Of Arturo Ui 教父阿塗	Theatre Horizon	
2019 (28th)	Anthony Chan Kam-kuen	The Big Meal 盛宴	Hong Kong Repertory Theatre	
2019 (28th)	Ata Wong Chun-tat	Papa 爸爸	Théâtre de la Feuille	
2019 (28th)	Desmond Tang Wai-kit	The Memory of Water 她媽的葬禮	Project Roundabout	
2020 (29th)	Tony Wong Lung-pun	Dust and Dawn 我自在江湖	Hong Kong Academy for Performing Arts	
2020 (29th)	Desmond Tang Wai-Kit	Always by Your Side 陪著你走	Hong Kong Arts Festival	
2020 (29th)	Tang Shu-wing	Dead Man's Cell Phone 死人的手機	Tang Shu-wing Theatre Studio	
2022 (30th)	Chan Siu-tung	Try to be Funny 雄顏一笑	BHT Theatre	
2022 (30th)	Weigo Lee Kwok-wai and Rocelia Fung Wai-hang	A Winter Funeral 玩轉婚前身後事	Hong Kong Repertory Theatre	
2022 (30th)	Kingston Lo Yee-king	Der goldene Drache 金龍	Hong Kong Academy for Performing Arts	
2023 (31st)	Andrew Chan Hang-fai	The Visit 老婦還鄉記	Alice Theatre Laboratory	
2023 (31st)	Rocelia Fung Wai-hang	Love à la Zen 愛情觀自在	Hong Kong Repertory Theatre	
2023 (31st)	Poon Wai-sum	Confrontations 兩刃相交	Hong Kong Repertory Theatre	
2024 (32nd)	Fong Chun-kit	Scapin in Jiānghú, Chap. 2023 史家本第二零二三回之伏虎降龍	Hong Kong Repertory Theatre	
2024 (32nd)	Lee Chun-chow	Moscow Express 從金鐘到莫斯科	Hong Kong Repertory Theatre	
2024 (32nd)	Chan Chu-hei	Show Me Your Love 愛我別走	SUCH HK	
2025 (33rd)	Kingston Lo Yee-king	The Bucket 半桶水	Hong Kong Repertory Theatre	
2025 (33rd)	Bobby Lau Shau-ching	Vacant Possession 凶的空間	Hong Kong Repertory Theatre	
2025 (33rd)	Joey Leung and Edmond Tong	Di-Dar	Windmill Grass Theatre	
2026 (34th)	Fiona Yim	In Hollywood We Trust 荷里活有單大生意	Dramoxic	
2026 (34th)	Tony Wong Lung-pun	What the Buddha Said 我佛無著經	Hong Kong Academy for Performing Arts	
2026 (34th)	Edmond Lo Chi-sun	The Play that Goes Wrong 你個戲壞咗呀！	Chung Ying Theatre Company	
