= Hong Kong Drama Award for Best Director (Tragedy/Drama) =

Annual theatrical award

The Hong Kong Drama Award for Best Director (Tragedy/Drama) is presented by the Hong Kong Federation of Drama Societies at the Hong Kong Drama Awards ceremony, recognizing the most outstanding direction in a tragedy or drama production of the year.

== Past winners ==
Year	Name	Title	Theatre company/production	Ref.
1992 (1st)	Chung King-fai	M. Butterfly 蝴蝶君	Hong Kong Repertory Theatre	
1992 (1st)	Lee Ming-sum	Uncle Doggie's Nirvana (Note: alternative title Nirvana of Mr. dog) 狗兒爺涅槃	Hong Kong Repertory Theatre	
1992 (1st)	Ko Tin-lung	One of the Lucky Ones 伴我同行 (Note: lit. 'Walk with Me ')	Hong Kong Repertory Theatre	
1993 (2nd)	Ko Tin-lung	I Have a Date with Spring 和春天有個約會	Hong Kong Repertory Theatre	
1993 (2nd)	May Fu Yuet-mai	The night rider 黑夜衝激	Hong Kong Repertory Theatre	
1993 (2nd)	John Chung	Endgame 殘局 (Note: alternative Chinese title 終局)	Seal Players	
1994 (3rd)	Fredric Mao	The Legend of a Storyteller 說書人柳敬亭 (Note: lit. 'Storyteller Liu Jingting ')	Chung Ying Theatre Company	
1994 (3rd)	Anthony Chan Kam-kuen	瘋癲皇帝 lit. 'The Insane Emperor '	Hong Kong Federation of Drama Societies	
1994 (3rd)	Ko Tin-lung	The Mad Phoenix 南海十三郎	Hong Kong Repertory Theatre	
1995 (4th)	Fredric Mao	Children of the Wind 風中細路	The Musical Company	
1995 (4th)	Dominic Cheung Ho-kin	Johnny Got His Guns 情危生命線	旭日坊劇團 lit. 'Rising Sun Theatre Company'	
1995 (4th)	Tang Shu-wing	Deathtrap 月黑風高殺人夜	Exploration Theatre	
1996 (5th)	Chung King-fai and Sammy Lam Lap-sam	The End of the Long River 長河之末	Hong Kong Academy for Performing Arts	
1996 (5th)	James Mark	Death of a Salesman 推銷員之死	Hong Kong Federation of Drama Societies	
1996 (5th)	Ho Ying-fung	Entering Miss Julie 元洲街茱莉小姐的最後一夜 (Note: lit. 'Miss Julie's Last Night on Yuen Chau Street ')	Theatre Resolu	
1997 (6th)	Chung King-fai	The Shadow Box 明月明年何處看 (Note: lit. 'Where will I see the bright moon next year? ')	Hong Kong Repertory Theatre	
1997 (6th)	May Fu Yuet-mai, Lo Wai-luk and Pak Yiu-charn	And the Boat Sailed On 起航!討海號	Amity Drama Club	
1997 (6th)	Ho Ying-fung	Miss Julie Doesn't Live Here Anymore 元洲街茱莉小姐不再在這裡	Theatre Fanatical	
1998 (7th)	Fredric Mao	The girl who turned the world upside down 跟住個𡃁妹氹氹轉	毛俊輝實驗創作 lit. 'Mao Chun Fai's Experimental Works'	
1998 (7th)	Jacob Yu	The Caine Mutiny Court-Martial 叛艦記WWII	Hong Kong Federation of Drama Societies	
1998 (7th)	Chung King-fai	Before the Rain Stops 瘋雨狂居 (Note: lit. 'Mad Rain, Wild Home ')	Hong Kong Repertory Theatre	
1999 (8th)	Daniel Yang	De Ling & Empress Dowager Ci Xi 德齡與慈禧	Hong Kong Repertory Theatre	
1999 (8th)	Victor Pang	Up he climbs, Down she crawls 狷窿狷罅擒高擒低	Actors' Family	
1999 (8th)	Chung King-fai and Anthony Chan Kam-kuen	The Dresser 風雨守衣箱 (Note: lit. 'Guarding the Dresser Through Wind and Rain')	Hong Kong Federation of Drama Societies	
1999 (8th)	Lee Ming-sum and Desmond Tang	The Wilderness 原野	Hong Kong Academy for Performing Arts	
2000 (9th)	Weigo Lee Kwok-wai	Cricket in My Life 三姊妹與哥哥和一隻蟋蟀 (Note: lit. 'Three Sisters, a Brother, and a Cricket ')	Prospects Theatre	
2000 (9th)	Fredric Mao	Forever and Ever 地久天長	Hong Kong Repertory Theatre	
2000 (9th)	Chung King-fai	A Sentimental Journey 劍雪浮生	The Spring-Time Group	
2001 (10th)	Lee Ming-sum	The Top Restaurant 天下第一樓 (Note: lit. 'World's Best Lou ')	Spring-Time Experimental Theatre	
2001 (10th)	Fredric Mao	Red Boat 煙雨紅船 lit. 'Red Boat in the Mist and Rain '	Emperor Entertainment Group	
2001 (10th)	Poon Wai-sum	Hu Xueyan, My Dear 親愛的‧胡雪巖	TNT Theatre	
2002 (11th)	Lee Ming-sum	What a Blissful Encounter, Mr. Ts'ai! 幸遇先生蔡	Chung Ying Theatre Company	
2002 (11th)	Dominic Cheung	Ng Wong the Swordsman 大刀王五	Theatre Space	
2002 (11th)	Victor Pang	The Border Town 邊城	Actors' Family	
2003 (12th)	Fredric Mao	Secret of Resurrection 還魂香	Hong Kong Repertory Theatre	
2003 (12th)	Ko Tin-lung	Alive in the Mortuary 留守太平間	Chung Ying Theatre Company	
2003 (12th)	Tang Shu-wing	Between Life and Death 生死界	No Man's Land (Note: now Tang Shu-wing Theatre Studio)	
2004 (13th)	Dominic Cheung	Twelve Angry Men 十二怒漢	Theatre Space	
2004 (13th)	Weigo Lee Kwok-wai	Dragon Head 龍頭	Prospects Theatre	
2004 (13th)	Victor Pang	The Good Person of Szechwan 四川好人	Actors' Family	
2005 (14th)	Cheung Tat-ming	Rotate 270° 旋轉270°	Hong Kong Repertory Theatre	
2005 (14th)	May Fu Yuet-mai and Ko Tin-lung	Inherit the Wind 承受清風	Hong Kong Federation of Drama Societies	
2005 (14th)	Dominic Cheung	DA 老竇 lit. 'Dad '	Theatre Space	
2006 (15th)	Tang Shu-wing	Phaedra 菲爾德	Hong Kong Federation of Drama Societies	
2006 (15th)	Fredric Mao	Proof 求證	Hong Kong Repertory Theatre	
2006 (15th)	Sammy Lam Lap-sam	Trojan women 木馬屠城後傳 (Note: lit. 'The Trojan Horse Afterstory ')	Hong Kong Academy for Performing Arts	
2007 (16th)	Tang Shu-wing	Hamlet 哈姆雷特	Hong Kong Academy for Performing Arts	
2007 (16th)	Dominic Cheung Ho-kin	Taiji 哲拳太極	Theatre Space	
2007 (16th)	Desmond Tang Wai-kit	The Unexpected Man 不期而遇的男人	We Draman Group	
2008 (17th)	Ko Tin-lung	Tuesdays with Morrie 相約星期二	Chung Ying Theatre Company	
2008 (17th)	Tang Shu-wing	Di Nu Hwa (Note: alternative title Princess Changping) 帝女花	Hong Kong Academy for Performing Arts	
2008 (17th)	Dominic Cheung Ho-kin	Sunday in the Park with George 點點隔世情 (Note: lit. 'Fragments of Love Beyond Time')	Theatre Space	
2009 (18th)	Andrew Chan	Seven Boxes Possessed of Kafka 卡夫卡的七個箱子	Alice Theatre Laboratory	
2009 (18th)	Dominic Cheung Ho-kin	Judgment at Nuremberg 紐倫堡大審判	Theatre Space	
2009 (18th)	Tang Shu-wing	Titus 泰特斯	Hong Kong Arts Festival and No Man's Land (Note: now Tang Shu-wing Theatre Studio)	
2010 (19th)	Lee Chun-chow	Murder in San José 聖荷西謀殺案	Hong Kong Arts Festival	
2010 (19th)	Victor Pang	The Passage Beyond 一屋寶貝	Actors' Family	
2010 (19th)	Tang Shu-wing	Titus Andronicus 2.0 泰特斯2.0	Tang Shu-wing Theatre Studio	
2011 (20th)	Tang Shu-wing	Rubik's Cube and its aftermath 魔方變奏	Hong Kong Academy for Performing Arts	
2011 (20th)	Anthony Chan Kam-kuen	Dr. Faustus 魔鬼契約	Hong Kong Repertory Theatre	
2011 (20th)	Edmond Lo Chi-sun	Frankenstein 科學怪人	Chung Ying Theatre Company and Hong Kong Academy for Performing Arts	
2011 (20th)	Hardy Tsoi Sik-cheong	Copenhagen 哥本哈根	Hong Kong Repertory Theatre and TNT Theatre	
2012 (21st)	Weigo Lee Kwok-wai	Death and the Maiden 不道德的審判 (Note: lit. 'The Immoral Judgment ')	Hong Kong Repertory Theatre	
2012 (21st)	Kenson Chan Wing-chuen	Eight Hundred Years of Hatred, Eight Hundred Years of Healing 火之鳥劇場版﹣八百比丘尼	POP Theatre	
2012 (21st)	Chan Chu-hei	The French Kiss 法吻	Theatre Horizon	
2013 (22nd)	Rocelia Fung Wai-hang	Red 紅	Hong Kong Repertory Theatre	
2013 (22nd)	Yu Hon-ting	Nitehawk 夜鷹姊魅	Drama Gallery	
2013 (22nd)	Tang Shu-wing	Another Last Lesson 完不了的最後一課	Chung Ying Theatre Company	
2014 (23rd)	Roy Szeto	The Emperor, his Mom, a Eunuch and a Man 都是龍袍惹的禍	Hong Kong Repertory Theatre	
2014 (23rd)	Lee Chun-chow	Smear 屠龍記	Hong Kong Arts Festival	
2014 (23rd)	Chan Chu-hei	Blast 爆．蛹	Hong Kong Arts Festival	
2015 (24th)	Rocelia Fung Wai-hang	Attempts on Her Life 安‧非她命	Hong Kong Repertory Theatre	
2015 (24th)	Brenda Chan	The Third Wave 第三波	Arts' Options	
2015 (24th)	Carmen Lo Ching-man	Informer 報案人	Cinematic Theatre	
2016 (25th)	Chan Chu-hei	Lazy People are Always Busy 忙與盲的奮鬥時代	Windmill Grass Theatre	
2016 (25th)	Fong Chun-kit	Marriage 結婚	Hong Kong Repertory Theatre	
2016 (25th)	Luther Fung	All My Sons 都是我的孩子	Hong Kong Federation of Drama Societies	
2017 (26th)	Lee Chun-chow	Three Brothers 三子	Hong Kong Repertory Theatre	
2017 (26th)	Roy Szeto	Hu Xueyan, My Dear 親愛的，胡雪巖	Hong Kong Repertory Theatre	
2017 (26th)	Tang Shu-wing	Macbeth 馬克白	Tang Shu-wing Theatre Studio	
2018 (27th)	Rocelia Fung Wai-hang	Le Père 父親 (Note: lit. 'The father ')	Hong Kong Repertory Theatre	
2018 (27th)	Andrew Chan	The Hong Kong Three Sisters 香港三姊妹	Alice Theatre Laboratory	
2018 (27th)	Chan Chu-hei	The Massage King 大汗推拿	Windmill Grass Theatre	
2019 (28th)	Tony Wong	Rashomon 羅生門	Chung Ying Theatre Company	
2019 (28th)	Fong Chun-kit	Auspicious Day 好日子	Hong Kong Repertory Theatre	
2019 (28th)	Chan Chu-hei	No News is True News 新聞小花的告白	Windmill Grass Theatre	
2019 (28th)	Edmond Lo Chi-sun	The Miracles of the Namiya General Store 解憂雜貨店	Chung Ying Theatre Company	
2020 (29th)	Lee Chun-chow	May 35th 5月35日	Stage 64	
2020 (29th)	Alex Taylor	The Normal Heart 尋常心	Windmill Grass Theatre	
2020 (29th)	Rocelia Fung Wai-hang	A Dream Like a Dream 如夢之夢	Hong Kong Repertory Theatre	
2022 (30th)	Chan Chu-hei	No News is True News 2 新聞小花的告白2	Windmill Grass Theatre	
2022 (30th)	Roy Szeto	The Woman in Kenzo 穿Kenzo的女人	Chung Ying Theatre Company	
2022 (30th)	Chu Pak-him and Yang Yun-tao	A Tale of the Southern Sky 一水南天	Hong Kong Dance Company and Actors' Family	
2023 (31st)	Fong Chun-kit	The Impossible Trial 大狀王	Hong Kong Repertory Theatre and West Kowloon Cultural District	
2023 (31st)	Octavian Chan	One Last Gift 最後禮物	Emperor Entertainment Group	
2023 (31st)	Tony Wong	We are gay 我們最快樂	Hong Kong Arts Festival	
2024 (32nd)	Birdy Wong Ching-yan	I am Tree 植物人	Artocrite Theatre	
2024 (32nd)	Tony Wong	Romeo and Juliet 茱麗葉與羅密歐	Hong Kong Academy for Performing Arts	
2024 (32nd)	Kingston Lo	Leave Him in The Dust 塵落無聲	Theatre Formula	
2025 (33rd)	Roy Szeto and Ata Wong Chun-tat	A Journey of Sanshiro 三四郎	Hong Kong Academy for Performing Arts School of Drama	
2025 (33rd)	Ivor Houlker and Michelle Li Yuen-jing	Songs of Innocence and Experience 天真與世故之歌	West Kowloon Cultural District and Rooftop Productions	
2025 (33rd)	Octavian Chan and Rocelia Fung Wai-hang	The Doctor 醫‧道	Hong Kong Repertory Theatre	
2026 (34th)	Roy Szeto	The Top Restaurant 天下第一樓	Hong Kong Repertory Theatre	
2026 (34th)	Yau Ting-fai	Le Fils 兒子	Hong Kong Repertory Theatre	
2026 (34th)	Chan Ping-chiu and Kingston Lo	Flowing Warbler 2.0 月明星稀2.0	On & On Theatre Workshop	
2026 (34th)	Wong Hin-yan and Santayana Li	In a Perfect World 完美的世界	On & On Theatre Workshop	
