= Hong Kong Drama Award for Best Actor (Tragedy/Drama) =

Annual theatrical award

The Hong Kong Drama Award for Best Actor (Tragedy/Drama) is presented by the Hong Kong Federation of Drama Societies at the Hong Kong Drama Awards ceremony, recognizing the most outstanding acting in a tragedy or drama production of the year.

== Past winners ==
Year	Name	Title	Theatre company/production	Ref.
1993 (2nd)	Fredric Mao	Moon Light Opera 一籠風月	Exploration Theatre	
1993 (2nd)	John Chung	Endgame 殘局	Seal Players	
1994 (3rd)	Chung King-fai	Henry IV 瘋癲皇帝 (Note: lit. 'The Insane Emperor ')	Hong Kong Federation of Drama Societies	
1994 (3rd)	Tse Kwan-ho	The Mad Phoenix 南海十三郎	Hong Kong Repertory Theatre	
1994 (3rd)	Lee Chun-chow	The Legend of a Storyteller 說書人柳敬亭 (Note: lit. 'Storyteller Liu Jingting ')	Chung Ying Theatre Company	
1995 (4th)	Chung King-fai	Amadeus 莫扎特之死	Hong Kong Federation of Drama Societies	
1995 (4th)	Dominic Cheung Ho-kin	The Sister Rosensweig 尋根姊妹花	Horizonte	
1995 (4th)	Tu Sze-chung	Feng chen san xia 風塵三俠	Sha Tin Theatre	
1995 (4th)	Jeffrey Ho	Black Elk Speaks 黑鹿開口了	Hong Kong Repertory Theatre	
1995 (4th)	Emotion Cheung	Johnny Got His Guns 情危生命線	旭日坊劇團 lit. 'Rising Sun Theatre Company'	
1995 (4th)	Jim Chim	The Unbearable Twain 再見紅日出 (Note: lit. 'See the red sun rise again ')	Theatre Ensemble	
1996 (5th)	Chung King-fai	Death of a Salesman 推銷員之死	Hong Kong Federation of Drama Societies	
1996 (5th)	Ting Ka-sheung	I Never Sang For My Father 教我如何不愛爸	Horizonte	
1996 (5th)	Fredric Mao	The Double Bass 小男人拉大琴	Theatre Resolu	
1997 (6th)	Simon Ngai Ping-long	Rashomon 羅生門	Hong Kong Federation of Drama Societies	
1997 (6th)	Yu Hon-ting	Dragon's legend 龍情化不開 (Note: lit. 'Deep Love For Home Cannot Dissolve ')	Exploration Theatre	
1997 (6th)	Kenson Chan Wing-chuen	Dragon's legend 龍情化不開	Exploration Theatre	
1998 (7th)	Chow Chi-fai	The Story of Qu Yuan 春秋魂	Hong Kong Repertory Theatre	
1998 (7th)	Chow Chi-fai	Before the Rain Stops 瘋雨狂居 (Note: lit. 'Mad Rain, Wild Home ')	Hong Kong Repertory Theatre	
1998 (7th)	Anthony Wong	The Girl Who Turned the World Upside Down 跟住個𡃁妹氹氹轉	毛俊輝實驗創作 lit. 'Mao Chun-fai's Experimental Works'	
1999 (8th)	Chung King-fai	The Dresser 風雨守衣箱 (Note: lit. 'Guarding the Dresser Through Wind and Rain')	Hong Kong Federation of Drama Societies	
1999 (8th)	Rensen Chan Man-kong	The father 父親	Hong Kong Academy for Performing Arts	
1999 (8th)	Yip Chun	Native son of Beijing 北京大爺	Hong Kong Repertory Theatre	
2000 (9th)	Lee Chun-chow	The Merchant Of China 紅頂商人胡雪巖	Chung Ying Theatre Company	
2000 (9th)	Yu Hon-ting	My Murder Story 我的殺人故事	No Man's Land (Note: now Tang Shu-wing Theatre Studio)	
2000 (9th)	Chan Chu-hei	Cricket in My Life 三姊妹與哥哥和一隻蟋蟀 (Note: lit. 'Three Sisters, a Brother, and a Cricket ')	Prospects Theatre	
2001 (10th)	Anthony Wong	To Kill or To Be Killed 螳螂捕蟬	Prospects Theatre	
2001 (10th)	Yau Ting-fai	Flowers for Algernon 天才耗夢	Hong Kong Academy for Performing Arts	
2001 (10th)	Tony Leung Ka-fai	Red Boat 煙雨紅船 lit. 'Red Boat in the Mist and Rain '	Emperor Entertainment Group	
2001 (10th)	Chan Woon-kau	Hu Xueyan, My Dear 親愛的‧胡雪巖	TNT Theatre	
2002 (11th)	Chan Chu-hei	The Border Town 邊城	Actors' Family	
2002 (11th)	Ko Tin-lung	What a Blissful Encounter, Mr. Ts'ai! 幸遇先生蔡	Chung Ying Theatre Company	
2002 (11th)	Poon Chan-leung	Uncle Vanya 凡尼亞舅舅	Hong Kong Repertory Theatre	
2003 (12th)	Tang Shu-wing	Sunshine Station 陽光站長	Amity Drama Club	
2003 (12th)	Fredric Mao	A Dream Like a Dream 如夢之夢	Hong Kong Repertory Theatre	
2003 (12th)	Tse Kwan-ho	Secret of Resurrection 還魂香	Hong Kong Repertory Theatre	
2003 (12th)	Ben Yuen	Alive in the Mortuary 留守太平間	Chung Ying Theatre Company	
2004 (13th)	William Lo Chun-ho	Action! Mr. Lai! 黎民偉，開麥拉！	Chung Ying Theatre Company	
2004 (13th)	Wong Cho-lam	Fiddler on the Roof 錦繡良緣	Hong Kong Academy for Performing Arts	
2004 (13th)	Chan Ping-chiu	Oleanna 奧利安娜的迷惑	On & On Theatre Workshop	
2004 (13th)	Lau Shau-ching	The Eccentricities of a Nightingale 請你愛我一小時	Hong Kong Repertory Theatre	
2005 (14th)	Chung King-fai	Inherit the Wind 承受清風	Hong Kong Federation of Drama Societies	
2005 (14th)	Pak Yiu-charn	Man of La Mancha 拉硬柴的夢遊騎士	TNT Theatre	
2005 (14th)	Tu Sze-chung	DA 老竇 lit. 'Dad '	Theatre Space	
2005 (14th)	Luther Fung	DA 老竇 lit. 'Dad '	Theatre Space	
2006 (15th)	Sun Wai-keung	Whose Life Is It Anyway? 生殺之權	Hong Kong Repertory Theatre	
2006 (15th)	Ko Tin-lung	Sleuth 謀殺遊戲	Hong Kong Federation of Drama Societies	
2006 (15th)	Lee Chun-chow	The French Kiss 法吻	SNAP Production	
2007 (16th)	Chung King-fai	The Unexpected Man 不期而遇的男人	We Draman Group	
2007 (16th)	Kenson Chan Wing-chuen	The Last Piece of Gold of Miss Pang 一粒金	Prospects Theatre	
2007 (16th)	Angus Chan Kin-ho	Hamlet 哈姆雷特	Hong Kong Academy for Performing Arts	
2007 (16th)	Simon Lo Man-kit	The Wild Duck 野鴨	Hong Kong Federation of Drama Societies	
2008 (17th)	Chung King-fai	Tuesdays with Morrie 相約星期二	Chung Ying Theatre Company	
2008 (17th)	Edmond Lo Chi-sun	Cyrano de Bergerac 風流劍客	Chung Ying Theatre Company	
2008 (17th)	Ko Kai-cheung	Waiting for the Match 獨坐婚姻介紹所	Cinematic Theatre	
2009 (18th)	Lau Shau-ching	Field of Dreams 頂頭鎚	Hong Kong Repertory Theatre	
2009 (18th)	Ng Wai-shek	Titus 泰特斯	Hong Kong Arts Festival and No Man's Land (Note: now Tang Shu-wing Theatre Studio)	
2009 (18th)	Ben Yuen	Freshly Frozen School 冰鮮校園	Chung Ying Theatre Company	
2009 (18th)	Stephen Au	The Visitor 奇異訪客	Theatre Space	
2010 (19th)	Pichead Amornsomboon	Scrooge! 奇幻聖誕夜	Hong Kong Repertory Theatre	
2010 (19th)	Chung King-fai	Richard III 李察三世	Hong Kong Repertory Theatre	
2010 (19th)	Desmond Tang Wai-kit	Murder in San José 聖荷西謀殺案	Hong Kong Arts Festival	
2011 (20th)	Tu Sze-chung	Copenhagen 哥本哈根	Hong Kong Repertory Theatre and TNT Theatre	
2011 (20th)	Pak Yiu-charn	Copenhagen 哥本哈根	Hong Kong Repertory Theatre and TNT Theatre	
2011 (20th)	Lee Chun-chow	The Truth About Lying 香港式離婚	Hong Kong Arts Festival	
2012 (21st)	Emotion Cheung	The French Kiss 法吻	Theatre Horizon	
2012 (21st)	Dick Liu Kai-chi	斜路黃花 lit. 'Yellow Flowers on the Slope '	Amity Drama Club	
2012 (21st)	Lau Shau-ching	The Last Supper 最後晚餐	Hong Kong Repertory Theatre	
2013 (22nd)	Poon Chan-leung	Rabbit Hole 心洞	Hong Kong Repertory Theatre	
2013 (22nd)	Ko Hon-man	Red 紅	Hong Kong Repertory Theatre	
2013 (22nd)	Eric Leung Chi-chung	Endgame 終局	Alice Theatre Laboratory	
2014 (23rd)	Poon Chan-leung	The Professor 教授	Hong Kong Repertory Theatre	
2014 (23rd)	Lau Shau-ching	The Emperor, his Mom, a Eunuch and a Man 都是龍袍惹的禍	Hong Kong Repertory Theatre	
2014 (23rd)	Kenson Chan Wing-chuen	Blast 爆．蛹	Hong Kong Arts Festival	
2014 (23rd)	Terence Chang Thomp-kwan	Gross Indecency: The Three Trials of Oscar Wilde 猥褻-三審王爾德	Pants Theatre Production	
2015 (24th)	Kenson Chan Wing-chuen	Wild Boar 野豬	We Draman Group	
2015 (24th)	Ng Wai-shek	Informer 報案人	Cinematic Theatre	
2015 (24th)	Wong Wan-choi	Footprints in the Show 一頁飛鴻	Hong Kong Repertory Theatre	
2016 (25th)	Jam Cheng Ka-chun	The Third Wave 第三波	Theatre Space and Arts' Options	
2016 (25th)	Yip Chun	The Chalk Circle in China 灰闌	Class 7A Drama Group Limited	
2016 (25th)	Chung King-fai	All My Sons 都是我的孩子	Hong Kong Federation of Drama Societies	
2016 (25th)	Chan Kiu	The Abandoned Harbour 維港乾了	Hong Kong Repertory Theatre	
2017 (26th)	Poon Chan-leung	Hu Xueyan, My Dear 親愛的，胡雪巖	Hong Kong Repertory Theatre	
2017 (26th)	Sun Wai-keung	Footprints in the Show 一頁飛鴻	Hong Kong Repertory Theatre	
2017 (26th)	Rensen Chan Man-kong	The Notebook Trilogy: The Third Lie 第三謊言	The Nonsensemakers	
2018 (27th)	Fredric Mao	Le Père 父親	Hong Kong Repertory Theatre	
2018 (27th)	Johnny Tan (Note: Chinese 陳康)	A Glimpse of Hope 傷城記	Stage 64	
2018 (27th)	Rex Kwok Wing-tung	Li Zhongyue and Qiu Jin 李鍾嶽與秋瑾	Tsuen Wan Youth Drama Society	
2019 (28th)	Ng Ka-leung	Three Impaired Monkey 初三	Hong Kong Repertory Theatre	
2019 (28th)	Ko Hon-man	Principle 原則	Hong Kong Repertory Theatre	
2019 (28th)	Edmond Lo Chi-sun	Rashomon 羅生門	Chung Ying Theatre Company	
2020 (29th)	Wang Wei	Pride 驕傲	Hong Kong Repertory Theatre	
2020 (29th)	Yau Chung-wai	May 35th 5月35日	Stage 64	
2020 (29th)	Joey Leung Cho-yiu	The Normal Heart 尋常心	Windmill Grass Theatre	
2022 (30th)	Angus Chan Kin-ho	A Tale of the Southern Sky 一水南天	Hong Kong Dance Company and Actors' Family	
2022 (30th)	Lau Shau-ching	Ambiguous 曖昧	Hong Kong Repertory Theatre	
2022 (30th)	Desmond Tang Wai-kit	Poison 毒	We Draman Group	
2023 (31st)	Jordan Cheng	The Impossible Trial 大狀王	Hong Kong Repertory Theatre and West Kowloon Cultural District	
2023 (31st)	Lau Shau-ching	The Impossible Trial 大狀王	Hong Kong Repertory Theatre and West Kowloon Cultural District	
2023 (31st)	Poon Chan-leung	One Last Gift 最後禮物	Emperor Entertainment Group	
2024 (32nd)	Simon Lo Man-kit	Quills 撒旦狂筆	Pants Theatre Production	
2024 (32nd)	Desmond Tang Wai-kit	The Cost of Living 我們所不知道的生活成本	Hong Kong Federation of Drama Societies	
2024 (32nd)	Desmond Tang Wai-kit	The Sympathetic Detonation 殉爆	Class 7A Drama Group Limited	
2025 (33rd)	Desmond Tang Wai-kit	Ward 6 六號病房	Fableist Ensemble and Artocrite Theater	
2025 (33rd)	Big John (Note: Chinese 陳力生)	Good People 良民備忘錄	Drama Gallery	
2025 (33rd)	Dayo Wong	The Truth About Lying 香港式離婚	Love Production	
2026 (34th)	Tse Kwan-ho	The Top Restaurant 天下第一樓	Hong Kong Repertory Theatre	
2026 (34th)	Yu Hon-ting	Le Fils 兒子	Hong Kong Repertory Theatre	
2026 (34th)	Chan Kiu	In Between 人間	Hong Kong Repertory Theatre	
