= Chan Lai-chu, Bonni =

Hong Kong based stage director and actress

- Born: Hong Kong
- Education: The Hong Kong Academy for Performing Arts
- Occupation: co-Artistic Director
- Organization: Theatre du Pif
- Honours: 2016 Honorary Fellowship of The Hong Kong Academy for Performing Arts

Bonni Chan Lai-chu (陳麗珠) is a Hong Kong stage director and actress. She is the co-Artistic Director of Theatre du Pif.

== Career ==
Bonni Chan was born and raised on the outlying island of Cheung Chau in Hong Kong. At the age of thirteen, after a chanced occasion seeing Swan Lake on film, she set off on what would become a lifelong journey of enquiry into the arts. She began to learn dance herself through whatever books she could find in libraries, and put her early ideas into practice by “choreographing” for her friends.

She won a scholarship to the Hong Kong Academy of Ballet, the territory's first professional dance training school where she studied classical ballet and modern dance. She also spent time in the summer school at the Royal Academy of Dance in London.

Around this time she also began to be fascinated by the language and form of drama, as she joined the drama courses held in the Academy's dance studio in evenings. In the year in which she graduated from the Dance Academy, she was accepted as one of the 15 students chosen for the first year of the School of Drama of the Hong Kong Academy for Performing Arts. There she went on receiving the Best Actress award for three consecutive years of study.

After graduating, she joined the Hong Kong Repertory Theatre and performed in a number of productions. In 1992, after working with various teachers in Europe for two years, Chan co-founded Theatre du Pif with Sean Curran in Scotland. The company was dedicated to theatre training, and focused on the creation of new original works that fused text and physicality, and were intended to speak to, inspire and move the audience.

Since relocating Theatre du Pif to Hong Kong in 1995, Chan has conceived and directed more than 30 original pieces of theatre, which have been acclaimed for their power and poetry. Theatre du Pif was quoted as “operating at the cutting edge of modern theatre” and “the most innovative and cross-culturally aware theatre company in Hong Kong”. The company has also staged plays by a variety of world dramatists including Jean Anouilh, Samuel Beckett, David Harrower, Henrik Ibsen, Sarah Kane, Federico Garcia Lorca, Harold Pinter, Yasmina Reza and Cao Yu and they have collaborated with a number of international theatre directors including Robert Draffin (Australia), Mikel Murfi (Ireland) and Adrian Noble (UK), Yang Jungung (Korea) and Jovanni Sy (Canada).

Taking theatre into the community has been a key element of the company's work and they facilitated a series of community theatre projects including three devised productions with a group of housewives from Hong Kong and Diversity (2002) commissioned by the Scottish Arts Council to celebrate cultural diversity in Scotland. The company also takes its work abroad, touring its productions upon invitation to Beijing, Berlin, Bogota, Manizales, Singapore, Shanghai, Macau, Vancouver and the UK. In 2010 Theatre du Pif was invited to stage its critically acclaimed production The Will to Build at the Shanghai World Expo where it was the opening programme of the Hong Kong cultural week.

Her performance in Fish Heads and Tales - A Tender War, and in The Oak Tree - An Odyssey won her two Hong Kong Drama Federation Best Actress awards. The Hong Kong Theatre Libre voted her Best Actress of the Year for her performance in 4.48 Psychosis - A Stage Reading. In 2016, she received an honorary fellowship of The Hong Kong Academy for Performing Arts.

In 2005, after studying with Miriam Pfeffer in Paris for four years, She is one of the first professional Feldenkrais practitioner in Hong Kong.

== Honors and awards ==
- 5th Hong Kong Drama Federation Best Actress award - Fish Heads and Tales - A Tender War
- 6th Hong Kong Drama Federation Best Actress award - The Oak Tree - An Odyssey
- 24th Hong Kong Drama Federation Best Actress nominee - Hedda Gaber
- 8th The Hong Kong Theatre Libre Best Actress award - 4.48 Psychosis
- 2016 The Hong Kong Academy for Performing Arts Honorary Fellowship

== Works ==
- fish heads & tales - a tender war
- the oak tree - an odyssey
- metamorphosis
- a Christmas carol
- the overcoat (1998)
- 5000 roses
- the ocean of stories
- la casa de...
- the solitaire mystery
- e never forgets
- the overcoat (2004, 2007)
- spooool!
- ashes to ashes
- nocturnal vista
- blackbird
- hanako's pillow
- the will to build (2008)
- antigone
- marcovaldo
- knives in hens
- the will to build (2010)
- sunrise
- god of carnage
- dance me to the end of love
- the isle
- crave
- a doll's house
- tintin
- la casa
- hedda gabler
- the will to build (2015)
- 4.48 Psychosis
- two
- white room
