= Record Museum =

Record shop in Hong Kong

- Interactive map of Record Museum

General information
- Location: 39 Yiu Wa Street, Causeway Bay, Hong Kong
- Coordinates: 22.277555487935015°N 114.18154143140049°E

The Record Museum is a record shop in Causeway Bay, Hong Kong singlehandedly run by James Tang Hong-sum. It boasts "20,000 vinyl records, cassettes and CDs, including about 700 master tapes" as well as vintage music equipment and memorabilia. In addition to serving as a storefront, it also hosts events, listening parties, and lectures on music.

== History ==
Tang grew up in a musical household in the sixties: "Our home would become a hotspot, as neighbours, street vendors, even police officers... That’s how I learned about music." One of ten children, he had two brothers who practiced with a band in his family's 600-square-foot apartment.

In 1987, Tang opened the Record Museum in the Wan Chai neighborhood of Hong Kong and amassed thousands of vinyls, cassettes, and CDs henceforth. Regarding Tang, music professor and Hong Kong Academy for Performing Arts director Adrian Walter stated: "There are probably very few people in the world who know more about the history of recording. He has a particularly keen ear and really hears what he is talking." With around 700 master tapes, including many belonging to The Beatles, Tang is considered by Far Out to own "one of the most substantial collections in the world."
