= Anthony Chan =

Anthony Chan may refer to:

- Anthony Chan (actor) (Chinese: 陳友, born 1952), Hong Kong actor
- Anthony Chan (economist) (born 1950s), chief economist at JPMorgan Chase & Co.
- Anthony Chan (dramatist) (born 1953), Hong Kong dramatist, director, set and costume designer
