= Jeffrey Ho =

Hong Kong artist (1956 - 2014)

- 何偉龍
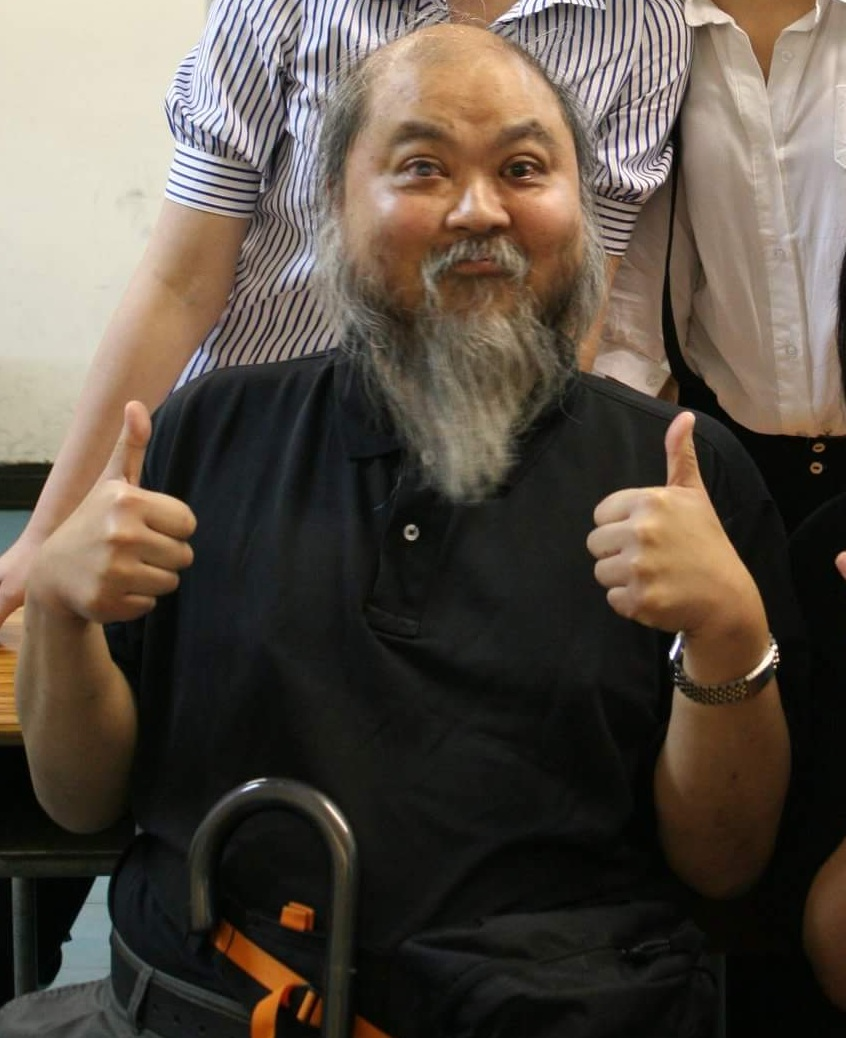
- Ho in 2011
- Born: 21 June 1956; Hong Kong
- Died: 7 January 2014 (aged 57); Hong Kong

Jeffrey Ho Wai-lung (Chinese: 何偉龍; 1956 – 7 January 2014) was a Hong Kong actor and director. Over the course of his career, Ho directed more than 150 stage productions and appeared in countless performances. He founded Wan Chai Theatre (Note: Chinese 灣仔劇團) (now Whole Theatre (Note: Chinese 團劇團)). Outside of theatre, he also appeared in film and television productions. One of his most recognizable roles was as the unscrupulous real estate company owner So Chung (Note: Chinese 蘇忠) in the sitcom City Japes. (Note: Chinese 城市故事)

== Biography ==
Ho was born in Hong Kong and later traveled to Canada to pursue drama studies. He graduated from York University and received professional training at the National Theatre School of Canada. After returning to Hong Kong in 1979, he became one of the first full-time actors of the Hong Kong Repertory Theatre after being interviewed by Chung King-fai. Ho remained active on the local stage thereafter.

From 1987 to 1992, he served as artistic director of the Wan Chai Theatre, dedicating himself to the promotion of amateur and community theatre and to nurturing a new generation of theatre practitioners. In 1993, he rejoined the Hong Kong Repertory Theatre as assistant artistic director until 2002.

=== Death ===
Ho suffered from congenital diabetes, which later led to kidney failure, requiring a kidney transplant. After the transplant, long-term use of steroids and anti-rejection medication caused bodily swelling, and his mobility declined in his later years. He died on 7 January 2014, at the age of 58. A memorial service was held on 27 January.

== Work ==
=== Theatre ===
==== Acting ====
- Hedda Gabler (1983) as Judge Brack
- Marat/Sade (1984) as Marquis de Sade
- King Lear (1993) as Lear - directed by Daniel Yang
- Christopher Sergel's Black Elk Speaks (1994) as Black Elk - directed by Daniel Yang

==== Directing ====
- Absurd Person Singular (1993)
- Der Besuch der alten Dame (The Visit, 1994)
- Raymond To's Miss To Sup-neung (Note: Chinese 杜十娘) (1996)
- The Servant of Two Masters (1995)
- The Imaginary Invalid (1998)

=== Films ===
Ho appeared in relatively few film productions, mainly from the mid-1980s to the early 1990s, including The Lunatics (1986), Flaming Brothers (1987), The Nobles (Note: Chinese 單身貴族) (1989), and Lucky Encounter (Note: Chinese 踢到寶) (1992), among others.

== Legacy ==
Jeffrey Ho was widely regarded as a pillar of Hong Kong theatre, remembered for his unwavering dedication and profound influence on generations of theatre practitioners. Despite declining health in his later years, Ho remained creatively active and continued performing until shortly before his death. His final stage appearance was in Haunted Haunted Little Star, staged just one month before he died. His persistence in continuing to create, even while enduring severe illness and repeated surgeries, was widely admired as a testament to his devotion to the art of theatre.

Many prominent figures in Hong Kong's performing arts scene credited his dedication and contribution. Fellow performer Dexter Young Tin-king recalled that even after falling and suffering facial bruises, Ho went to the hospital for X-rays and then immediately returned to the stage to perform. Critic Kuh Fei noted that although Ho secured an annual government subsidy of HK$1 million, it was insufficient for the theatre company's development, prompting Ho to mortgage his own Tseung Kwan O flat and invest a seven-figure sum of his personal funds.
