= Anthony Chan (dramatist) =

Hong Kong dramatist, director, set and costume designer (born 1953)

Anthony Chan Kam-kuen
- 陳敢權
- Born: 1953 (age 72–73)
- Occupations: dramatist, director, set designer, and costume designer

Anthony Chan Kam-kuen (born 1953) is a Hong Kong dramatist, director, educator, set designer, and costume designer. Throughout his career, he adapted and translated more than a hundred plays and directed more than eighty. He was the former head of the directing and playwriting at the School of Drama of the Hong Kong Academy for Performing Arts.

== Biography ==
Chan cannot recall the first theatre performance he ever saw, but he vividly remembers an event that aimed to "promote theatre" (Note: Chinese 普及戲劇活動) that let him watch a professional production for just HK$1. He saw Mourning Becomes Electra (素娥怨) directed by Chung King-fai, over a three-day run. He first joined Queen Elizabeth II Youth Centre Drama Group (伊青話劇組), an amateur drama club with Chung, James Mak (麥秋), and Lina Yan Hau-yee. At the time, he was mostly an actor and had collaborated with Leung Kwok-hung (Note: a retired Hong Kong props maker, worked at the Hong Kong Repertory Theatre.) in a mime.

He embarked on his playwright career at an early stage. In 1973, while still in tertiary education, he wrote his first play, Doomsday’s Wedding, which won seven awards, including Best Playwright, Best Director, Best Actor and Best Set Design, during the "Hong Kong Festival" (Note: Chinese 香港節戲劇創作比賽, lit. 'Hong Kong Festival Drama Production Competition') held at the Caritas Community Centre. After graduated from secondary education, he worked at the Hang Seng Bank by day and attended the TVB Artistes Training Class in the evening. While studying bachelors in the US, he worked in local theatre and as a set designer for productions; sometimes after work, he can sit in specific spots to watch multiple productions. He further studied directing at the University of Colorado at Denver and obtained a Master of Fine Arts degree. During which, he met Daniel Yang (楊世彭), who taught at a different campus (CU Boulder).

In 1982, he returned to Hong Kong. He applied for and became the city's first full-time stage manager position of Urban Council Arts Groups (市政局藝團), where he was interviewed by Chung King-fai, Lo King-man, and James Mak at Hong Kong City Hall. The position serves Hong Kong Dance Company, Hong Kong Chinese Orchestra, and Hong Kong Repertory Theatre. At the time, they used "pig cage vehicles" (豬籠車), typically for arresting unlicensed vendors, for transportation and stored equipments on an upper floor of an operating funeral home run by the Urban Council.

In the early-1990s, Chan gained international recognition. His Hong Kong Heartbeat, an ensemble production incorporating dance and music, was staged at the Festival Hong Kong '92 in London, Calgary and Ottawa by the Hong Kong Academy for Performing Arts. His Nuwa Mends the Sky toured Tarascon and Bordeaux, France, and won a best script award. (Note: Chinese 香港傑出創作劇, lit. 'Hong Kong Outstanding Original Production') In 1994, he translated, directed and designed the set for You Can't Take It with You.

He was former head of the directing and playwriting at the School of Drama of the Hong Kong Academy for Performing Arts. During his nearly two decades of service, he devoted himself to nurturing talents, and before stepping down, he completed the curriculum design for the Master of Fine Arts in drama programme.

Between 2008 and 2023, Chan served as the artistic director of Hong Kong Repertory Theatre until his retirement. Seeking to counter typecasting and broaden the actors' artistic range, he introduced an audition system that allowed supporting actors to compete for leading roles. He applied this approach in Field of Dreams, which he wrote and directed. The production won the Hong Kong Drama Award for Best Actor (Tragedy/Drama) (Lau Shau-ching). He also introduced the troupe to programme with a theme for each production season.

=== Personal life ===
Chan is married, and he met his wife in Hong Kong Repertory Theatre.

== Works ==
=== Plays ===
==== As a dramatist ====
Incomplete list (many of his earlier plays do not have official English titles)

- Doomsday's Wedding (世界末日的婚禮; January 1974)
- Warm Fuzzies (暖毛毛; June 1983)
- 1841 (March 1985)
- Cages Beast (困獸; 1985)
- Metamorphosis under the Stars (星光下的蛻變; March 1986)
- The night rider (黑夜衝激; November 1992)
- Hong Kong Heartbeat (香港心連心; 1992)
- Nuwa Mends the Sky (女媧; 1992; adapted)
- Our Town (1993; adapted)
- You Can't Take It with You (不搶錢家族; 1994; translated)
- 1941 (April 1997)
- The Call of A White Orchard (白蘭呼喚; October 1997)
- The Dresser (風雨守衣箱; 1997; translated)
- Formula of the Thunderstorm (周門家事; September 2000)
- The Border Town (邊城; December 2001)
- Macbeth (2001; translated)
- Autumn Execution (秋決; 2006; adapted)
- Di Nu Hua (帝女花; January 2007; adapted)
- Field of Dreams (頂頭鎚; 2008), an original musical
- A Flea in Her Ear (橫衝直撞偷錯情; 2009; translated)
- Dr. Faustus (魔鬼契約; 2010; translated)
- Reverie on an Empire (一年皇帝夢; August 2011)
- A Bowlful of Kindness (有飯自然香; 2012)
- Footprints in the Show (一頁飛鴻; 2014, 2016), mixed with Cantonese opera
- 1894 Hong Kong Plague (太平山之疫; 2016), an original musical
- Speaking in Tongues (叛侶; 2020; translated)

==== As a set or costume designer ====
- Children of a Lesser God (1996)

== Awards ==
- 1991 Artist of the Year Award from the Hong Kong Artists' Guild
- 1994 Outstanding Achievements of the Decade from the Hong Kong Federation of Drama Societies
- 2009 Outstanding Translator Award from the Hong Kong Federation of Drama Societies
