= Béthanie (Hong Kong) =

Old sanatorium in Pok Fu Lam, Hong Kong

Coordinates: 22.262156°N 114.135342°E

- 伯大尼修院
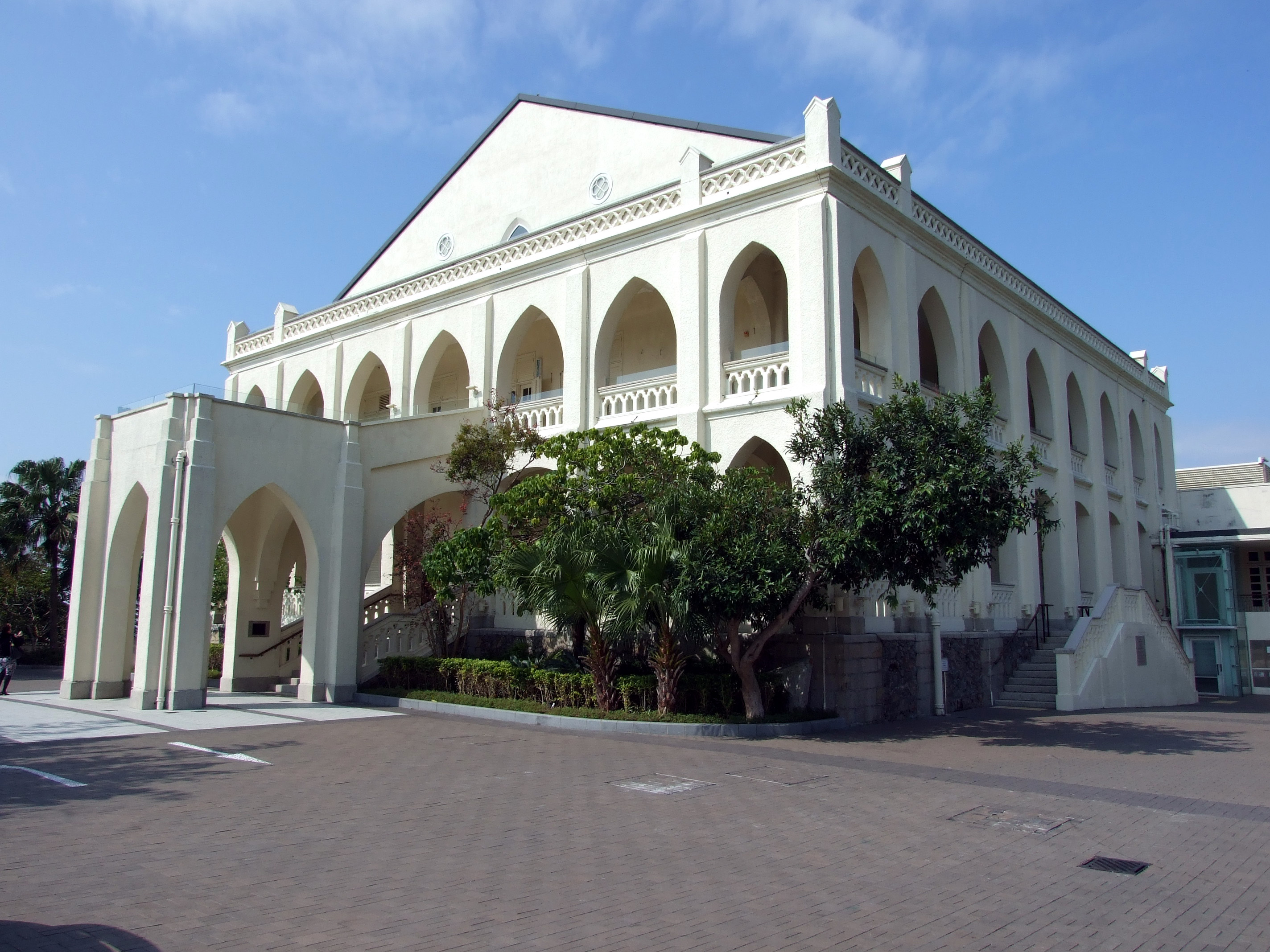
- Béthanie in Pok Fu Lam
- Interactive map of the Béthanie area
- Former names: Béthanie Sanatorium

General information
- Architectural style: Neo-Gothic
- Location: 139, Pok Fu Lam Road, Hong Kong Island
- Current tenants: Hong Kong Academy for Performing Arts
- Completed: 1875

Béthanie is a historic building complex located in Pok Fu Lam, in Southern District, Hong Kong built in 1875 as a sanatorium by the Paris Foreign Missions Society.

Béthanie and the nearby Dairy Farm cowsheds were allocated in 2003 to the Hong Kong Academy for Performing Arts. After a series of renovations, the complex reopened in 2006 and is now used by the Academy's School of Film and Television. In addition to educational facilities, it includes two performance venues, an exhibition hall, a chapel and a museum. It was declared a monument in 2013.

== Location ==
Béthanie is located at No. 139, Pok Fu Lam Road, on Hong Kong Island. Situated between the pine trees, with the seaview of the coast, Béthanie's geographical site provided an ideal restorative place for the French priests to recover from tropical diseases at that time.

Today, the Chinese Cuisine Training Institute (CCTI) is located adjacent to Béthanie. Drivers can reach Béthanie by following signs leading to the CCTI.

== History ==
=== Before World War II (1875–1941) ===
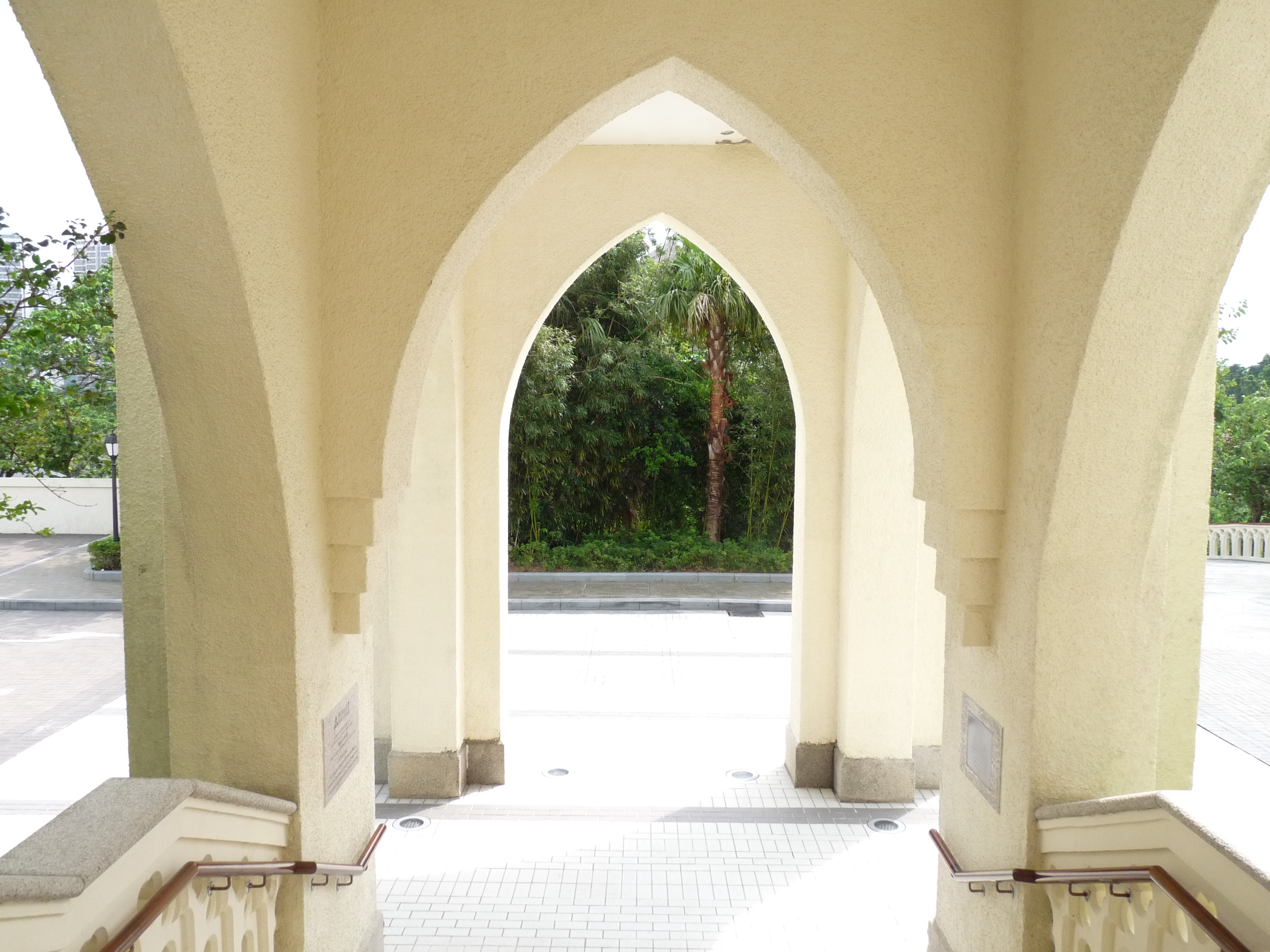
Neo-Gothic structures

Béthanie was the first sanatorium to be built in Hong Kong. Originally bought from a certain J.J. dos Remedios in June 1873, in 1875, the Missions Étrangères de Paris, led by Pierre-Marie Osouf, finished building Béthanie to serve as a place for priests and missionaries from all over Asia to recover from tropical diseases before returning to their missions. At the same time, the missionaries and priests organized a small-scale printing press in Béthanie to work. The printing press turned out to be a successful operation, publishing religious items of 28 languages. Osouf's assistant, Fr. Charles Edmond Patriat, supervised the construction of the building and became the first Superior of Béthanie upon its opening in 1875. In 1887, Patriat requested a leave of absence and was succeeded by Fr. Holhaan.

During its early years, Béthanie suffered many deaths of missionaries due to the immature medicinal technology as well as the spread of incurable tuberculosis. Between 1875 and 1886, 11 fathers had died under the age of 50. However, in its functions throughout a near century, the sanatorium had successfully nursed back to health hundreds of sick missionaries. In 1886, upon the appointment of Fr. Holhaan as Superior, Béthanie had seen an increase from 15 to 20 annual visitors in its initial years, to more than 40 in 1887–1890, and well over 50 in the following years. Due to the increase in volume of visitors, an average of 20 visitors at once were occupying the 14 available rooms in Béthanie. In the years of the 1890s, Fr. Holhaan found supplies to be stretched and rooms to be overcrowded, therefore leading to his first plan of enlargement for Béthanie in 1890s.

During this time as well, an internal debate regarding the future of Béthanie was impeding the construction plans. The problem arose of whether or not nuns from the French Convent of St. Paul de Chartres in Hong Kong could be invited to help with patient care in the sanatorium. Of the next five years, the topic was discussed persistently but was eventually decided against. Fr. Holhaan felt that priorities of Béthanie's future lay within the expansion of the building and in 1896 construction began and was completed within the following year. The overall construction and expansion of the building cost the Missions Étrangères de Paris $15,820, roughly equivalent to the annual running costs of the establishment. The sanatorium continued to run smoothly for the next fifty years.

=== World War II and afterwards (1941-1974) ===
It was not until the second day of Japanese occupation in December 1941 that troops forced their way into the building searching each corner, taking material goods as well as ransacking the building. The missionaries were put under two days' house arrest without food or water and were then forced to leave their own premises. In desperation for fuel, the Japanese devastated the 50-year-old coniferous trees that covered the grounds of the sanatorium, leaving it bare. At the end of the war, Japanese surrender led to a prompt return of the Missions Étrangères de Paris back to Béthanie. In the years of recovery, patients were sent to the French Hospital run by the Sisters of St Paul de Chartres as the new superior of Béthanie since 1946, Fr Vignal, supervised the refurbishment of the house which was re opened in February 1949.

After the Communist Revolution of 1949, growing pressures mounted on the expulsion of missionaries and Béthanie felt the mounting pressure of political unrest. In the 2 years that followed, Béthanie was again working well beyond capacity, serving 70 missionaries, totaling 4,950 days of stay.

=== Closure and redevelopment ===
In 1974, the Fathers sold Béthanie to Hongkong Land for redevelopment. In time, Hongkong Land determined the site too difficult to develop. In an exchange of land agreement, the Hong Kong government took Béthanie subject to a demolition order. For the next five years the threat of destruction loomed over the sanatorium. In 1978, a group of students studying at the University of Hong Kong occupied the buildings while waiting for an additional accommodation on campus to be constructed. A new appreciation for the heritage site arose and the community began to feel the responsibility of preserving it. In 1981, Béthanie was saved and listed as a Grade II historic building. During its hundred years of operation, the death rate was incredibly low: the number of deaths coincidentally equaled with the number of years of operation - 100 in all, or in an average of one a year.

Throughout the time period of 1978 - 1997, Béthanie continued to be used by the University of Hong Kong as a storage warehouse, where it slowly deteriorated due to neglect. In 2000, the Architectural Services Department commissioned a study to investigate the restoration of the Béthanie buildings. It was not until March 2003, when the Legislative Council of Hong Kong (LEGCO) approved funds for the Hong Kong Academy for Performing Arts to restore Béthanie.

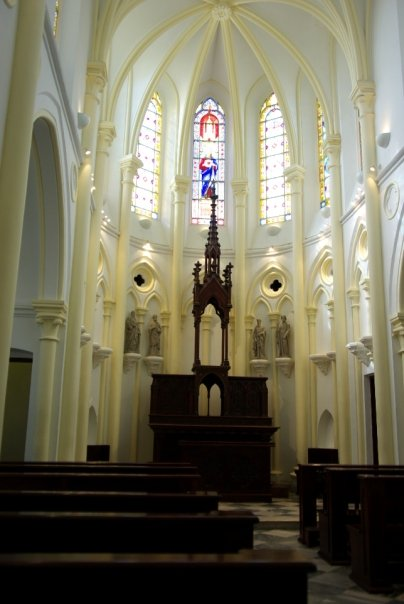
Interior of the Béthanie chapel

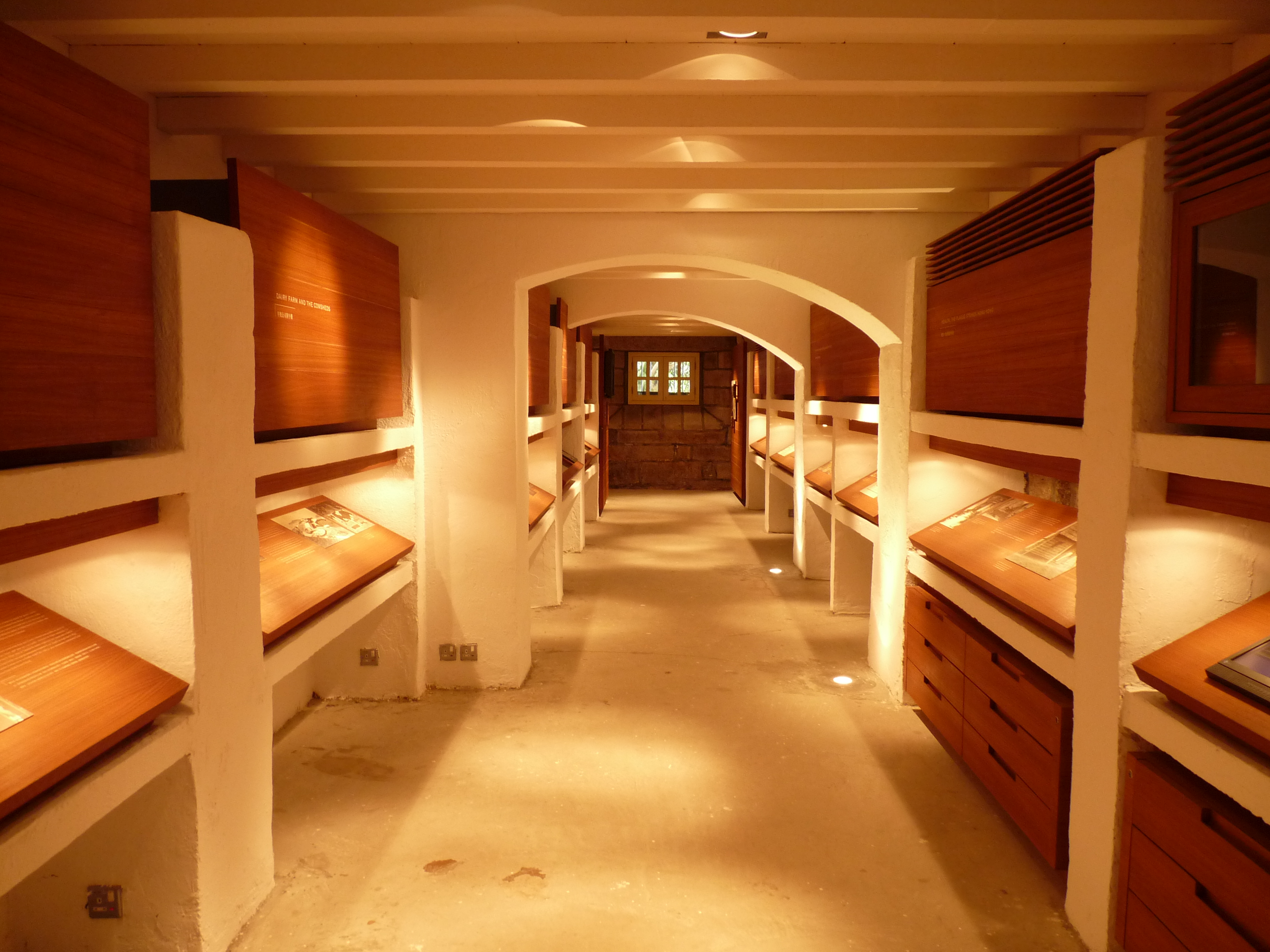
Display of historical information in Béthanie museum

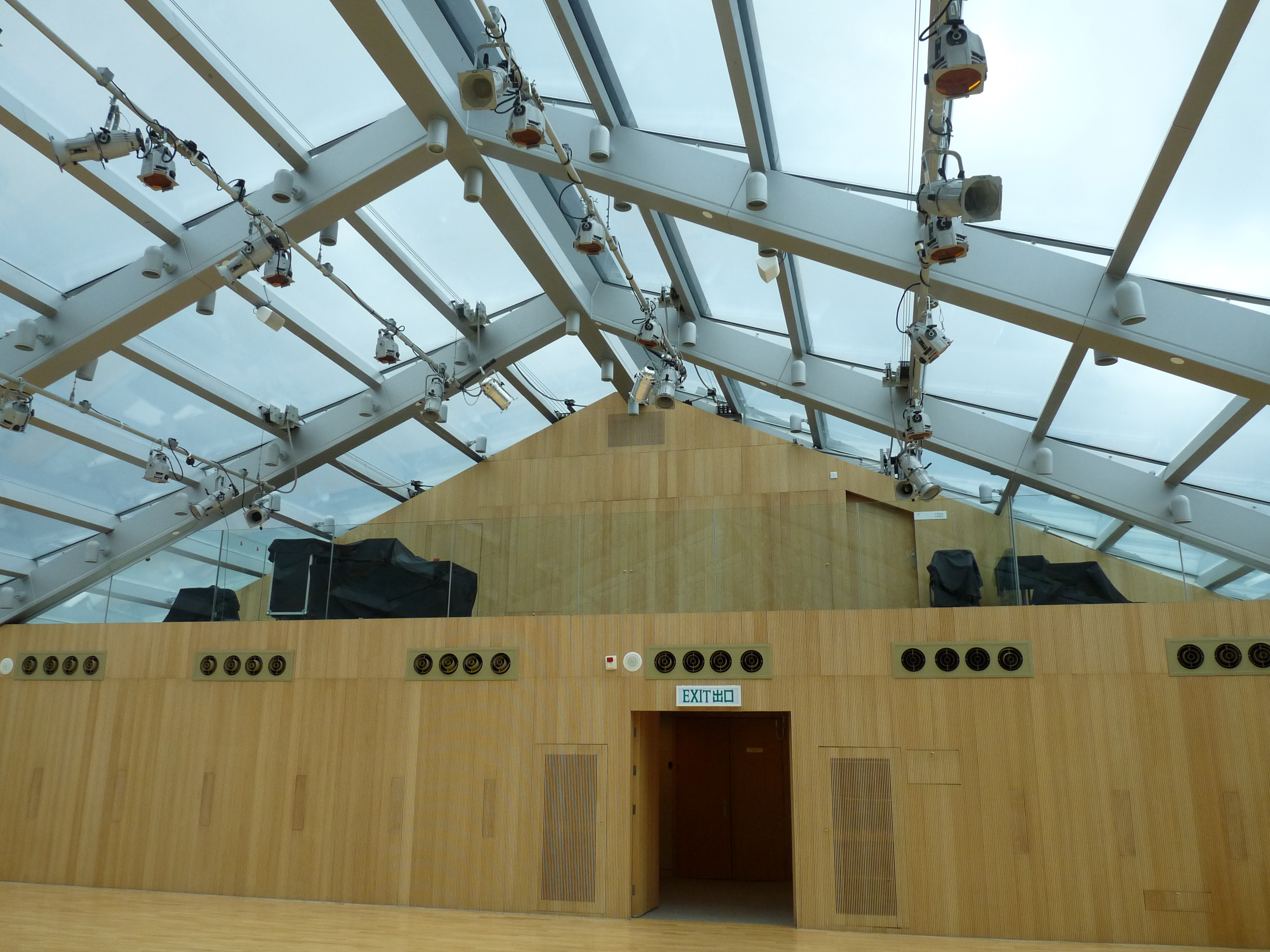
A glazed roof top in Sir Yuk Pao Studio

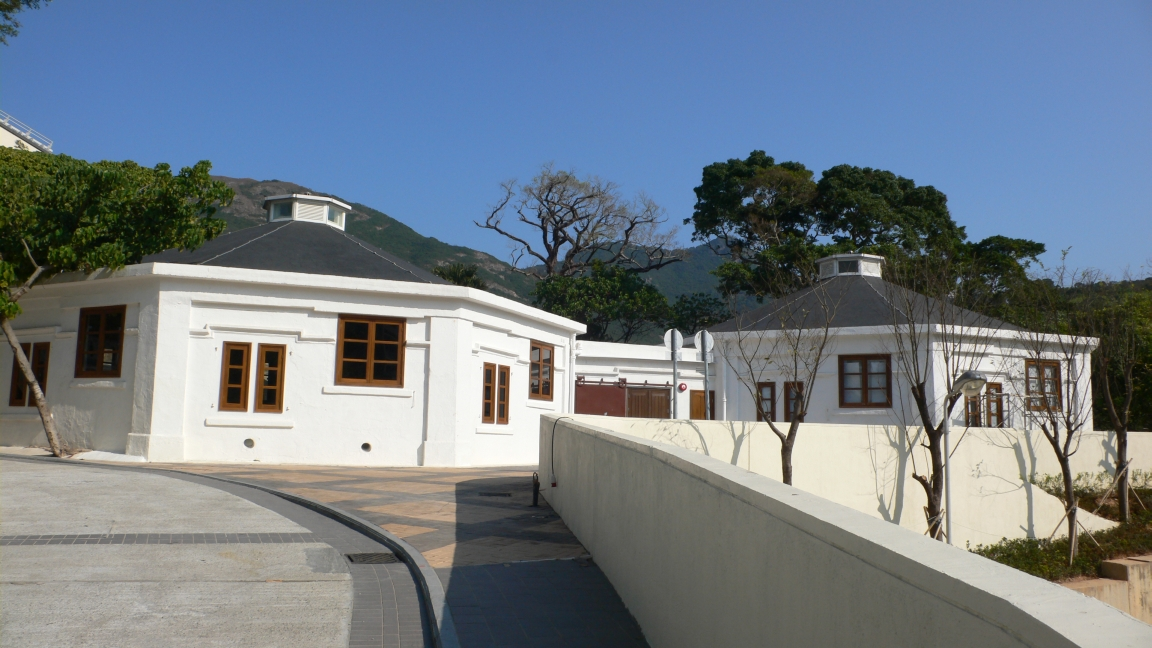
The former cowsheds, now part of the Hong Kong Academy for Performing Arts

In 2003, after considering the restoration options and future developments of Béthanie, the Legislative Council decided to support the restoration of the place and its two nearby Dairy Farm cowsheds, by providing funds to the Hong Kong Academy for Performing Arts (APA). It took roughly three years to complete the project (including renovation and search for missing artefacts) and cost an estimated HK $80 million. The alteration of the cowsheds led to a development of different facilities.

Béthanie was then listed as a Grade I historic building in 2009, and was declared as a monument in 2013.

George C. Tso Memorial Chapel Designed with a neo-Gothic structure, the George C. Tso Memorial Chapel has been used since 17 December 2006 for regular religious service by the Emmanuel Church-Pokfulam, a daughter church of St. John's Cathedral (Anglican), which carries on the historical Christian use of the site. Every Sunday, a congregation of worship is held. Also, the chapel is open for public use and admiration, including weddings and guided tours. The heritage building has retained its original charm and appeal from the restoration project. Many of its distinctive features, such as the stained glass windows, paneled doors and altar, have all been preserved or restored.

Béthanie Theatre To mark the 120th anniversary of its founding in 1886, Dairy Farm sponsored the transformation of the two historic octagonal cowsheds into a modern theatre. The first octagon is a foyer and exhibition area; the second is an intimate 150 seat performance space equipped with advanced acoustics for music and audio/visual support for seminars, film screenings and corporate events. The adjacent foyer is suitable for exhibitions, cocktail receptions and corporate functions. The original octagonal roof and milking stalls have been retained for visitors’ appreciation.

School of Film and Television The School of Film and Television is a branch school of the HKAPA which became functional in September 2006. Most of the facilities and classrooms are now in use but certain facilities such as the TV studio are kept in the academy's Wan Chai campus. The School of Film and Television has its own individual environment, with its own building, garden and roof garden. These settings can provide students with rest areas and place for gatherings.

Museum of Béthanie The basement of Béthanie, once used as a wine cellar and dry goods storage, has now been converted into a museum displaying historical items of Bethanie and the French missionary's activities in Asia throughout the past 300 years.

Jackie Chan Screening Room The Jackie Chan suite is located on the second floor. It was funded through a donation by the Jackie Chan Charitable Fund. The suite is built with modern facilities for the School of Film and Television such including a 70-seat screening room, an audio/visual room and a product design room.

Sir Y.K. Pao Studio Today, Sir Y.K. Pao Studio, sponsored by Dr Helmut Sohmen and Professor Anna Pao Sohmen, serves as a spectacular multi-function room on the second floor of Béthanie. The room was originally a pitched roof with tiles. Due to the limited space, it was later reconstructed with a flat roof. It was not until the restoration project when the distinctive pitch roof was brought back into the design, using double-glazed panels of glass. The studio has a floor area of 21 square metres (230 ft^{2}) is equipped with wall mirrors, dance bars, glazed windows and other technical facilities and non-permanent seating.

== Architectural style ==
Béthanie is one of the city's few examples of French colonial architecture. Throughout the mid-19th century, the significant penetration of Western culture into Hong Kong led to the emergence of a new cultural blend of eastern and western influences which affected Hong Kong's architecture. French architecture was seen as a vehicle for cultural interchange and its role in the formation of this distinctive Hong Kong identity was profound.

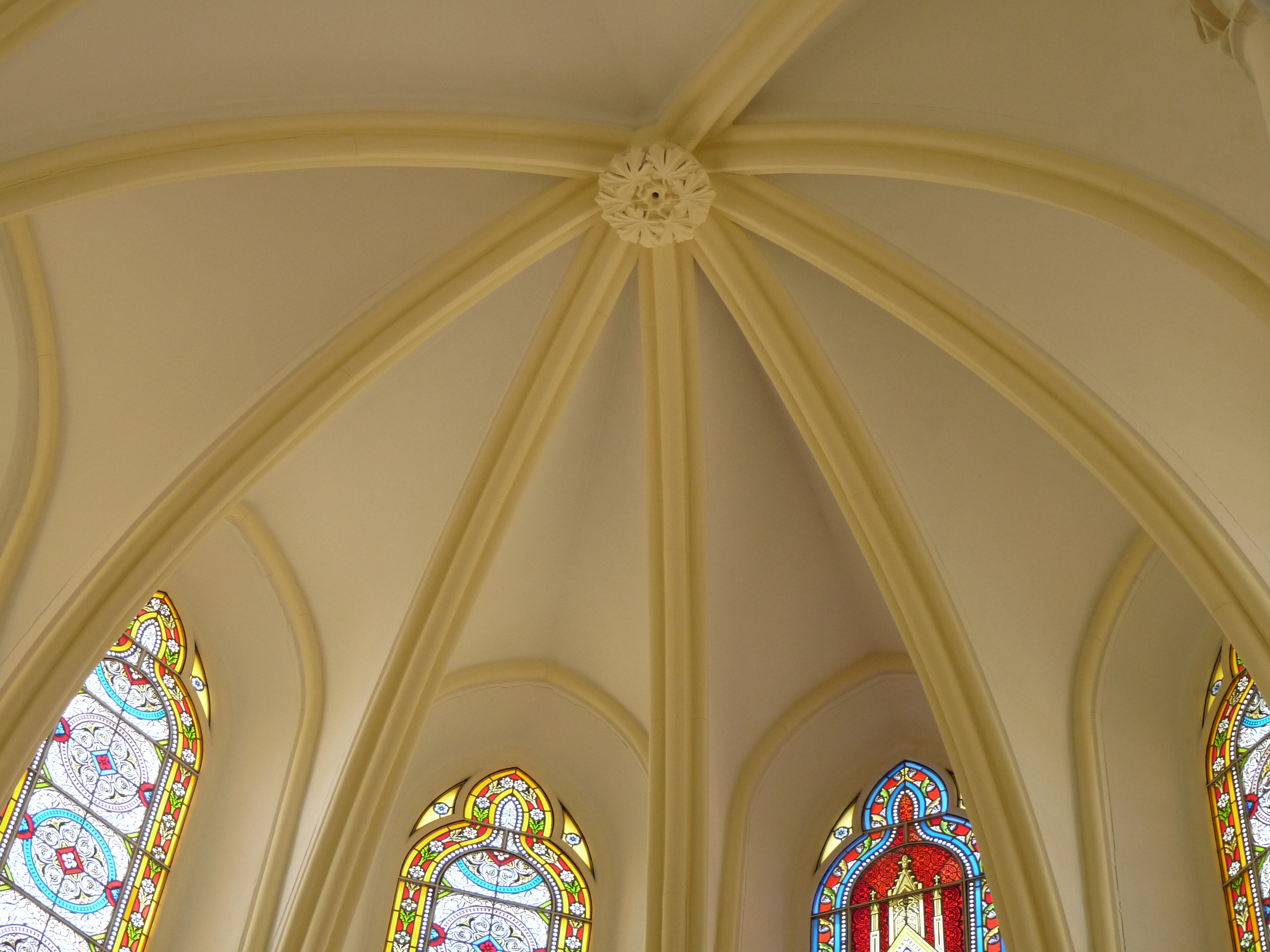
Rib vaults in Béthanie chapel.

French architectural style spread as Hong Kong developed during three key phases: arrival, the second half of the 19th century; expansion, the early 20th century to the Japanese occupation; and renewal, the post-war period to present.

Based on neo-Gothic design, Béthanie is a composition of symmetrical cylinders. Apart from that, ogive, tracery, stained glass and Gothic arched windows can be found in the building. With a high ceiling and pitched roof, the George C. Tso Memorial Chapel is a typical illustration of neo-Gothic architectures in Béthanie, though in a much simpler style and smaller scale. Among its nineteen stained glass windows, nine were originals. The remaining ones, either in disrepair or missing, were reproduced hand-made in the Philippines. Also, only four out of the twelve statues of the apostles, originally standing on corbels above the altar, have been found. Although the genuine ones were unavailable for exhibition, the Academy has replicated the statues with a silicone molding technique. Moreover, many neo-gothic structures within the perimeter have been conserved. One of these examples are the flying buttresses that were used to support the exteriors of buildings in the past. Although no longer functional, they have been restored to maintain authenticity. The Rib vaults, built in to support the ceiling and roof have also been retained in the chapel for decorative purposes.

The efforts in restoration led Béthanie to receive a UNESCO Asia-Pacific Heritage Award in 2008, for the modernized appearance in the aftermath of the restoration project. The honour is attributed to architect Philip Liao and Hong Kong Academy of Performing Arts associate director of operations, Philip Soden. A citywide search to recover the original furnishings was carried out to restore the site to its historical appearance. According to Soden, the hardest part of the restoration was to equip the building with air conditioning, fire services and lighting without affecting the overall appearance of the building.

== Contribution to history and religion ==
=== Hong Kong - French relations ===
Béthanie witnessed the changes of Hong Kong-Franco relation hence contributing to history. Examples are shown below:

==== 1964-2008: French International School ====
In 1964, on the premises of the Béthanie sanatorium in Pok Fu Lam, the first "small French-speaking school" was founded. At first, it could only accommodate 35 students. Over the years, the school has moved its location several times: from the Alliance française in Wan Chai to the Catholic centre, and then, in 1975, to the former military hospital on Borrett Road. In 1984 the Lycée Victor Ségalen was founded, with a new constitution and in new buildings at Jardine's Lookout. Once again, the school quickly reached its maximum capacity, and it became necessary to find additional premises in Kowloon to admit new students. In 1999, a new campus was opened on Blue Pool Road. Today, the Lycée Ségalen is the largest French International School in Asia, with more than 1700 students and 200 employees.

==== French architectural legacy in Hong Kong ====
Buildings erected in Hong Kong by the French community since 1848 represent a major non-British contribution to the history of Hong Kong. Among those still surviving today are the Béthanie sanatorium and the St Paul's church; and perhaps the most visible, the Former French Mission Building, an elegant neo-classical three-storey building, with red bricks walls and Doric and Ionic columns.

==== The French “Fathers” of the bauhinia ====
The floral emblem of Hong Kong, the bauhinia, (as represented on the flag of the Hong Kong S.A.R. since 1997), was discovered by French people. The plant was first observed in Hong Kong by the Fathers of the French Foreign Missions near Mount Davis and was later studied by the Fathers of the Béthanie sanatorium in Pokfulam from specimens growing in their gardens in the 1880s.

==== 1848-2008: 160 years of relationships between France and Hong Kong ====
In 2008, the Consulate General of France celebrated the 162th anniversary of the French presence in the territory. The French Mission building Béthanie in Pokfulam is one of their evident marks on Hong Kong history.

=== Religion ===
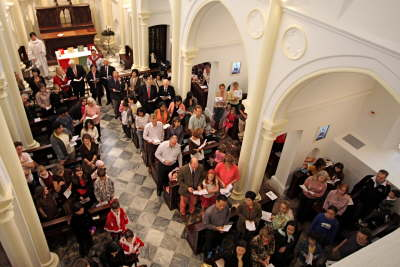
Regular religious services re-commenced in the Béthanie Chapel on 17 Dec 2006.

Béthanie has had a long history under the occupancy of French priests and missionaries. Over the last century or so, the complex has served a number of religious purposes. From its roots as a sanatorium for priests to a printing press for HKU, Béthanie's roots were tied in deeply with early French Christianity and continued on throughout the 20th century.

The Béthanie's chapel is still used for religious purposes. Notably, the Béthanie Chapel has been used since 17 December 2006 for regular Sunday services by the Emmanuel Church - Pokfulam a daughter church of St. John's Cathedral (Anglican), which carries on the historical Christian use of the site. Furthermore, the chapel is also made available to the public for weddings, other religious services and ceremonies.

== See also ==
- Former French Mission Building
- University Hall (University of Hong Kong)
- Hong Kong Academy for Performing Arts
