= Chung King-fai =

Hong Kong actor, director and filmmaker (1937–2026)

- 鍾景輝
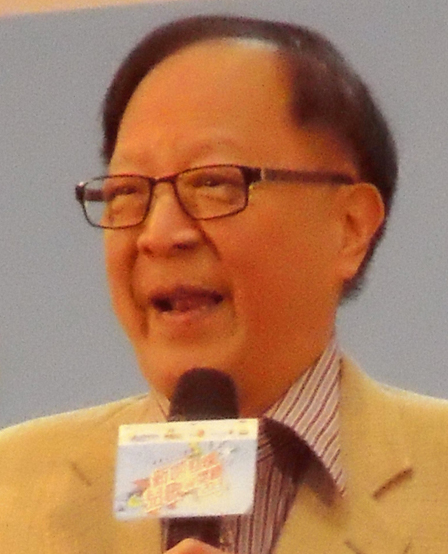
- Chung in 2014
- Born: 23 March 1937; Bangkok, Thailand
- Died: 3 June 2026 (aged 89); Hong Kong
- Other name: King Sir
- Education: Oklahoma Baptist University (BA); Yale University (MFA)
- Occupations: Actor; director; host
- Years active: 1967–2018

Chinese name
- Traditional Chinese: 鍾景輝
- Simplified Chinese: 钟景辉
Transcriptions
Standard Mandarin
- Hanyu Pinyin: Zhōng Jǐnghúī
Yue: Cantonese
- Jyutping: Zung^{1} Ging^{2}-fai^{1}

Signature
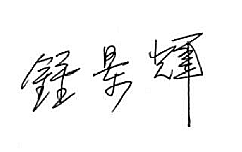

Chung King-fai (Note: Chinese: see Chinese name and romanisations) (23 March 1937 – 3 June 2026), also affectionally known as King Sir, was a Hong Kong actor, television and theatre director, and programme host. Considered a titan of the Hong Kong theatre scene, he was the first to introduce theatre of the absurd and Broadway musicals to Hong Kong audiences in Cantonese, and played a crucial role in popularising Western drama locally.

His translated productions in the 1960s, such as Death of a Salesman, Our Town, and A Hatful of Rain, galvanised the local theatre scene. Subsequently, he directed and performed in over a hundred-stage productions, including The Zoo Story, M. Butterfly, West Side Story, Amadeus, and The Dresser, winning 11 Hong Kong Drama Awards. Chung was the honorary president of the Hong Kong Federation of Drama Societies, which he founded and served as chairman. He also co-founded the Hong Kong Repertory Theatre in 1977 and served as the founding Dean of Drama at the Hong Kong Academy for Performing Arts from 1985 until his retirement in 2001.

Beyond theatre, Chung was also prominent in television and film. He began his career at TVB as a scriptwriter in 1967, and later joined Rediffusion Television as scriptwriter and director in 1975. He had also starred in the TVB sitcom Welcome to the House (2006–2007), as well as series including My Family (2005), The Dance of Passion (2006), The Stew of Life (2009), Line Walker, and Come On, Cousin (both 2014). He was also notable for narrating the ATV documentary program Stories from Afar (1998–2004), and for his roles as Kent Lang and Sir Ho Sai in the films God of Gamblers 3: The Early Stage (1996) and Lawyer Lawyer (1997).

== Life and career ==
=== Early life and education ===
Chung King-fai was born on 23 March 1937 in Bangkok, Siam (now Thailand), to a family of Chinese expatriates, with ancestral roots in Taishan, Guangdong. His great-grandfather was a dockyard merchant. His father graduated at Lingnan University, Guangzhou, and worked as an accounting clerk at the Alexandra Building in Hong Kong. His mother, surnamed Cheung, was from Shanghai. While Chung was two months old, his family moved to Hong Kong and settled on Stone Nullah Lane in Wan Chai. He attended a rooftop kindergarten. At around the age of four, due to the Japanese occupation of Hong Kong, his family travelled by train to Shanghai, Nanjing, and Anhui to seek refuge. From 1942 to 1947, he lived in the Shanghai French Concession and completed primary four, attending the primary section of the McTyeire School, a school for affluent families.

In 1947, Chung returned to Hong Kong. He was admitted directly into primary five at Pui Ching Middle School. While studying form six, he won the overall championship at the inter-school athletics meet. At the same time, he was actively involved with the school's drama society, serving two terms as its chairman. He won the Best Actor award at the Inter-School Dramatic Competition (Note: Chinese 校際戲劇比賽, is a competition originally held by Education Department of Hong Kong from 1950 to 1960, and resumed in 1991.) in 1953 for The Cheats of Scapin and again in December 1954 for The Lost Silk Hat. He had a strong interest in dance and drama, though his academic performance was average.

Between 1955 and 1957, as Hong Kong did not yet have a performing arts academy and others were unsupportive of a career in the arts, Chung enrolled in the Department of English at Chung Chi College. In 1958, he went to the United States and entered Oklahoma Baptist University directly into the second semester of the third year in Speech and Drama, with a minor in English. Chung was later admitted to the Yale School of Drama for a three-year Master of Fine Arts programme, and graduated in 1962. He was the only Asian among more than 170 students.

=== 1960s to 1980s: Pioneer of theatre and television leader ===
Chung returned to Hong Kong in 1962 after completing his studies in the United States. Invited by Dr. Maurice J. Anderson, then founding vice-president of Hong Kong Baptist College, he served as an assistant lecturer in English Language and Literature for three years, during which he taught drama. It was the first time for drama courses to be taught in the tertiary education in Hong Kong. He also founded the College Dramatic Society there. In June 1964, he directed the society's production of Death of a Salesman, which was financially successful with nearly HK$40,000 in profit. While teaching at Hong Kong Baptist College, Chung also worked part-time as a scriptwriter and director at Rediffusion Television (now Asia Television), Hong Kong's first cable television network. During his tenure there, he translated and adapted numerous Western plays for television production, including The Glass Menagerie by Tennessee Williams.

In 1965, Chung was granted a World University Service Staff Training Fellowship to pursue further studies at New York University in Dramatic Arts for ten months. In the same year, senior TVB executive Steve Huang Shih-chiu sent him a formal invitation through Yao Ke. (Note: Chinese 姚克 (1905–1991), a prominent Chinese playwright) Chung continued teaching at Hong Kong Baptist College for another year and officially joined TVB in June 1967. In October 1967, he was appointed senior screenwriter and was promoted to general programme manager. In 1971, he proposed to the TVB senior management to establish a one-year artiste training program to address the shortage of performers, and served as an instructor for the first four intakes. Following Robert Chua's transfer in November 1973, Chung temporarily held both roles of general programme manager and production manager.

In August 1975, Rediffusion Television reached an agreement with Chung for him to join immediately after his contract ended with TVB. TVB reassigned him to the role of assistant general manager. In February 1976, Chung was appointed director of Chinese programming at Rediffusion Television and then also the role of assistant general manager from December 1976. In August 1977, he became deputy general manager. In February 1982, Chung initially planned to resign to pursue personal interests and to establish his own company, but was ultimately persuaded to stay and take over the responsibilities of Lee Sil-hong. He eventually stepped down on 1 March 1983.

Beginning in 1983, he took part in preparations for the establishment of the Hong Kong Academy for Performing Arts, the first tertiary institution of its kind in the territory. When the academy officially opened in 1985, he became the founding Dean of the School of Drama. During his tenure, he developed a comprehensive degree programme covering acting, playwriting and directing, and incorporated a substantial body of Western drama into the curriculum as core material. From 1998 to 2004, Chung also narrated for all six seasons and 182 episodes of the ATV documentary program Stories from Afar, where the media credited the series' popularity to his "sentimental" voice-overs.

=== Later career, illness and death ===
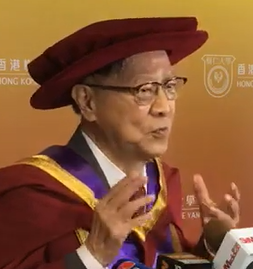
Chung receiving an honorary doctorate from HKSYU in November 2018

After retiring in 2001, Chung remained active in the performing arts, continuing to take on roles in both stage productions and television programmes. In 2005, Chung participated in a Hong Kong government-funded TV advertisement campaign, "Our Home, Our Country", to promote the Chinese national anthem by providing narration that explained its historical background.

In 2012, Chung authorised the publication of his biography Self-disciplined, Pragmatic, Humble, Harmonious: Chung King-fai. (Note: Literal translation of the Chinese title 寬實清和．鍾景輝) Written by Hong Tsz-ling, the book "documents the origins of Chung King-fai's inextricable bond to the art of drama from 1937 to the present."

After undergoing surgery for colorectal cancer in 2016, Chung gradually withdrew from public appearances following his work on Finding Her Voice to focus on recovery. In 2017, Chung stepped down as president of the Hong Kong Federation of Drama Societies after 33 years of service from its founding. In subsequent years, his health declined noticeably, with reduced mobility eventually needing the use of a wheelchair. He received an Honorary Doctor of Letters from Hong Kong Shue Yan University in November 2018.

Chung died at home in his sleep on 3 June 2026, at the age of 89.

== Filmography ==
=== Film ===
Year	Title	Role	Ref.
1984	Love in a Fallen City	Mr. Hsu	
1986	Passion	Dr. King	
1994	I Have a Date with Spring	Himself	Cameo
1996	Tristar	Dinosaur	
1996	Hu-Du-Men	Chan Yiu-jo	
1996	Black Mask	Commissioner of Police	
1996	God of Gamblers 3: The Early Stage	Kent Lang	
1997	Lawyer Lawyer	Sir Ho Sai	
2003	The Source of Love	Chen Hon-ming	
2005	A.V.	Boss	
2015	Wonder Mama	Chairman Li	
2018	Distinction	Zoey's grandfather	
2020	Septet: The Story of Hong Kong	Old man's father	

=== Television series ===
Year	Title	Role	Network	Ref.
1976	Springs and Autumns of the Three Kingdoms	Wong Wan	RTV	
1979	Dragon Strikes	Prince Ning	RTV	
2003	The Threat of Love II	Ho Fung-nin	TVB	
2005	My Family	Man Tai-lor	TVB	
2006	Welcome to the House	Ko Hing	TVB	
2006	The Dance of Passion	Yim Kwok-yip	TVB	
2006	Land of Wealth	Chai Hok-yan	TVB	
2006	At Home With Love	Chung Bong	TVB	
2007	Word Twisters' Adventures	Heavenly King	TVB	
2007	The Building Blocks of Life	Kong Sing-yue (Preston)	TVB	
2009	The Stew of Life	Ng Man-tak	TVB	
2010	A Fistful of Stances	Au-Yeung Biu	TVB	
2011	A Great Way To Care	Leong Wai Keong	TVB	
2011	Only You	Shaw Chun-fai	TVB	
2011	The Other Truth	Hau Pak-kan (Clayton)	TVB	
2012	Divas in Distress	Fung Han-man	TVB	
2012	The Confidant	Lau Dor-sun	TVB	
2013	Will Power	Shum Yik-wo (Paul)	TVB	
2014	Rear Mirror	Yiu Siu Bong	TVB	
2014	Line Walker	Chin Shui-on	TVB	
2014	Come On, Cousin	Lam Chi-wing	TVB	
2015	Limelight Years	Zoek Si	TVB	
2015	Angel In-the-Making	Dom Cheung	TVB	
2016	Come Home Love: Dinner at 8	Koo Lik-hang	TVB	
2016	Law dis-Order	Ching Yat-hong (Henry)	TVB	
2016	Come with Me	Lam Si-yuen	TVB	
2017	My Ages Apart	Barrister Wu	TVB	Cameo
2019	Finding Her Voice	Bak Chin-ngam	TVB	

== Accolades ==
Year	Award	Category	Work	Result	Ref.
1992	Hong Kong Drama Awards	Best Director (Tragedy/Drama)	M. Butterfly	Won	
1993	Hong Kong Drama Awards	Best Director (Comedy/Farce)	A Foxy Tale	Won	
1994	Hong Kong Drama Awards	Best Actor (Tragedy/Drama)	Henry IV	Won	
1994	Hong Kong Drama Awards	Best Director (Comedy/Farce)	Driving Miss Daisy	Nominated	
1995	Hong Kong Drama Awards	Best Actor (Tragedy/Drama)	Amadeus	Won	
1995	Hong Kong Drama Awards	Best Director (Comedy/Farce)	Guys and Dolls	Nominated	
1996	Hong Kong Drama Awards	Best Actor (Tragedy/Drama)	Death of a Salesman	Won	
1996	Hong Kong Drama Awards	Best Director (Tragedy/Drama)	The End of the Long River	Won	
1997	Hong Kong Drama Awards	Best Director (Tragedy/Drama)	The Shadow Box	Won	
1998	Hong Kong Drama Awards	Best Director (Tragedy/Drama)	Before the Rain Stops	Nominated	
1999	Hong Kong Drama Awards	Best Actor (Tragedy/Drama)	The Dresser	Won	
1999	Hong Kong Drama Awards	Best Director (Tragedy/Drama)	The Dresser	Nominated	
1999	Hong Kong Arts Development Awards	Arts Achievement in Drama	—N/a	Won	
2000	Hong Kong Drama Awards	Best Director (Tragedy/Drama)	A Sentimental Journey	Nominated	
2002	Bronze Bauhinia Star	—N/a	—N/a	Won	
2005	Hong Kong Drama Awards	Best Actor (Tragedy/Drama)	Inherit the Wind	Won	
2005	TVB Anniversary Awards	TVB Award for Best Actor	My Family	Nominated	
2006	TVB Anniversary Awards	TVB Award for Best Supporting Actor	The Dance of Passion	Nominated	
2006	TVB Anniversary Awards	Life Achievement Award	—N/a	Won	
2007	Hong Kong Drama Awards	Best Actor (Tragedy/Drama)	The Unexpected Man	Won	
2008	Hong Kong Drama Awards	Best Actor (Tragedy/Drama)	Tuesdays with Morrie	Won	
2010	Hong Kong Drama Awards	Best Actor (Tragedy/Drama)	Richard III	Nominated	
2010	Hong Kong Drama Awards	Best Director (Comedy/Farce)	A Funny Thing Happened on the Way to the Forum	Nominated	
2013	Silver Bauhinia Star	—N/a	—N/a	Won	
2016	Hong Kong Drama Awards	Best Actor (Tragedy/Drama)	All My Sons	Nominated	
2018	Hong Kong Drama Awards	Life Achievement Award	—N/a	Won	
