= Fredric Mao =

Hong Kong artist

Fredric Mao Chun-fai
- 毛俊輝
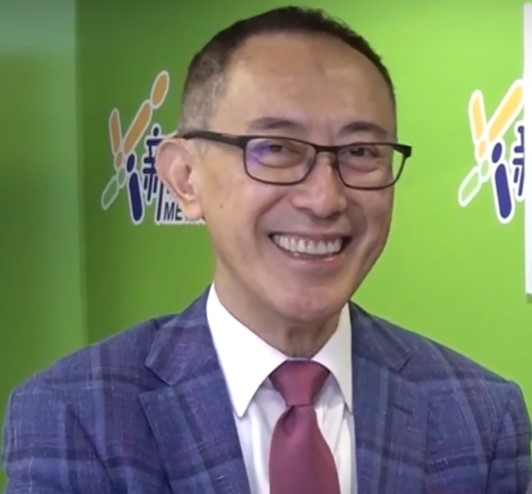
- Born: February 3, 1947 (age 79); Shanghai, China
- Education: Baptist College; University of Iowa (MA Drama)
- Occupations: Director, actor; theatre educator
- Known for: Artistic Director of the Hong Kong Repertory Theatre (2001–2008),Director Laureate of the Hong Kong Repertory Theatre
- Notable work: Broadway debut in Pacific Overtures (1976);
- Spouse: Amy Wu (胡美儀) (m. 2004)
- Awards: Bronze Bauhinia Star (2004); Honorary Fellow of the HKAPA (2005); Outstanding Artistic Contribution Award (2017); Lifetime Achievement Award - Hong Kong Drama Awards (2024)

Fredric Mao Chun-fai (毛俊輝; born 1947) is a Hong Kong theatre director and actor. He served as the artistic director of the Hong Kong Repertory Theatre (HKRep) from 1 April 2001 to 31 March 2008. He is currently the director laureate of the HKRep.

== Early life and education ==
Mao moved to Hong Kong from Shanghai as a teenager. He studied at Bethel School (伯特利中學) in Kowloon City (Form 6 in 1964), and later studied English literature at the Department of Foreign Languages of Baptist College (now Baptist University of Hong Kong). There, he was taught by Chung King-fai, who sparked his interest in theatre. He also joined the Hong Kong Amateur Players' Club (香港業餘話劇社) and gained both acting and backstage production experience including costume design, particularly in Tennessee Williams's The Glass Menagerie directed and acted by Chung.

In 1968, he went to the University of Iowa in the United States to study drama (acting major and directing minor) and obtained a Master of Fine Arts (MFA). As a non-native English speaker and an Asian actor, he faced limited performance opportunities and had to put in extra effort to overcome cultural and language barriers. At the time, the MFA was a relatively new degree and was regarded as the highest academic qualification in the arts, comparable to a PhD. After graduating, he studied under Sanford Meisner, (Note: a theatre practitioner who developed a system to train actors called the Meisner Technique) widely regarded as one of the three most prominent theatre instructors at the time, for two years. Meisner initially rejected him due to his MFA, saying the course focused on fundamentals, but Mao insisted that he still hoped to study under him and was accepted.

== Career ==
Between 1972 and 1985, he worked professionally in the United States with various theatre companies, including directing and acting in theater, film, and television, and participated in Broadway musicals. While pursuing directing opportunities, he also worked with New Dramatists. At the age of 27, he served as the artistic director of Napa Valley Theatre Company in California, and later served as the deputy director of the New Media Repertory Company in New York. In 1976, he made his New York Broadway debut in Pacific Overtures, a musical with music and lyrics by Stephen Sondheim, and directed by Harold Prince.

In 1985, Mao returned to Hong Kong. That same year, he began to serve as the head of acting at the inception of the Hong Kong Academy of Performing Arts (HKAPA). He helped design the School of Drama and the curriculum for directing. His students included Anthony Wong, Jim Chim, Olivia Yan, Tse Kwan-ho, Emotion Cheung, Joey Leung, Lau Nga-lai (劉雅麗), Louisa So, Lau Yuk-chui (劉玉翠), Anita Lee, Sunny Chan, Cheung Tat-ming, Karley Ng Ka-hai (Mok Hei; 1985), and Lo Chi-sun (盧智燊).

In 1989, he directed his first production for HKRep, a double bill featuring David Henry Hwang's A Sound of a Voice and Raymond To's A Gleam of Colour, which was produced in HKRep's first ever Black Box Theatre under his advice. His first acting production after returning to Hong Kong is Raymond To's Moon Light Opera (1992), where he was the protagonist and met his wife Amy Wu, under the invitation of Karley Ng at the 10th anniversary of Exploration Theatre. Mao gained widespread acclaim for his directing in the 1990s, notably for The Legend of a Storyteller (1993) and The Kids, the Wind and the City (1994). His acclaimed adaptation and direction of Shaw's Saint Joan (1997) was considered one of the decade's best productions and won six awards at the Hong Kong Drama Awards.

In 2001, he became the first artistic director of the Hong Kong Repertory Theatre after its incorporation. Establishing its brand and maintaining high-quality original productions posed significant challenges. He also sought to diversify its repertoire by introducing other forms of theatre, including physical theatre. At the time, pay for staff followed a civil service-style system inherited from its period under the Hong Kong government, which is largely based on seniority and years of service rather than performance. In response to limited training and career prospects for theatre practitioners, he introduced a performance-based reward system to better recognize talent and contribution. Under his leadership, HKRep produced their first play outside of the city with Sweet & Sour Hong Kong, reaching Shanghai. This milestone helped the company spread its name beyond Hong Kong.

Over the years, Mao has taught at Stanford University, University of Toronto, Peking University, Central Academy of Drama in Beijing, and the Hong Kong Academy for Performing Arts.

In 2002, Mao was diagnosed with a late-stage lymphoma in his stomach. He underwent surgery to remove his entire stomach and received chemotherapy.

In a 2017 oral history interview organized by the International Association of Theatre Critics (IATC), Mao said that the object that best represents his life would be the comics of Al Hirschfeld, a New York artist known for illustrating the performing arts and their artists. Hirschfeld created drawings of many Broadway theatre productions, typically one piece per performance, later collected into his published works. One of these illustrations features Mao himself, credited under his former name, "Freddy Mao." The artwork was also published in The New York Times. Mao added that this serves as a meaningful reminder that he was once part of the American theatre scene.

In May 2022, with the support of the Hong Kong & Macau Intangible Cultural Heritage Research Center and the Hong Kong Jockey Club, Mao launched the three-year project called "Jockey Club Mao Chun Fai Innovative Works in Theatre Scheme" (賽馬會毛俊輝劇藝研創計畫), which means that opera will become the focus of his work for some time to come. The project will explore the "creativity" of Cantonese opera, and hopes to write a new chapter for the development of traditional Cantonese opera through Mao's rich knowledge of directing, creation and talent training, as well as his rich experience in stage practice in Chinese and Western cultures. While cultivating a new generation of all-round Cantonese opera talents, he plans to introduce new creative styles that are in line with the development of the times and recognized by the public, continuously expand the Cantonese opera audience, and enable the intangible culture of "Cantonese opera" to be inherited and developed.

== Honor ==
Mao won the Hong Kong Drama Award for Best Director five times and the Best Actor Award (Tragedy/Drama) twice, and was awarded the "Artist of the Year Award" by the Hong Kong Artists Guild. In 2004, he was awarded the Bronze Bauhinia Star by the Hong Kong SAR Government, and in 2005 he was made an Honorary Fellow of the Hong Kong Academy for Performing Arts. In 2017, he received the Outstanding Artistic Contribution Award from the Hong Kong Arts Development Awards. In 2024, Mao was awarded the "Lifetime Achievement Award" by the Hong Kong Drama Society at the 32nd Hong Kong Drama Awards in recognition of his outstanding achievements and contributions in various fields such as directing, acting, drama education and research.
