= Tang Shu-wing =

Stage director and actor in Hong Kong

- Traditional Chinese: 鄧樹榮
- Simplified Chinese: 邓树荣
Transcriptions
Standard Mandarin
- Hanyu Pinyin: Dèng Shùróng
Yue: Cantonese
- Yale Romanization: Dahng Syüh-wìhng

Tang Shu-wing
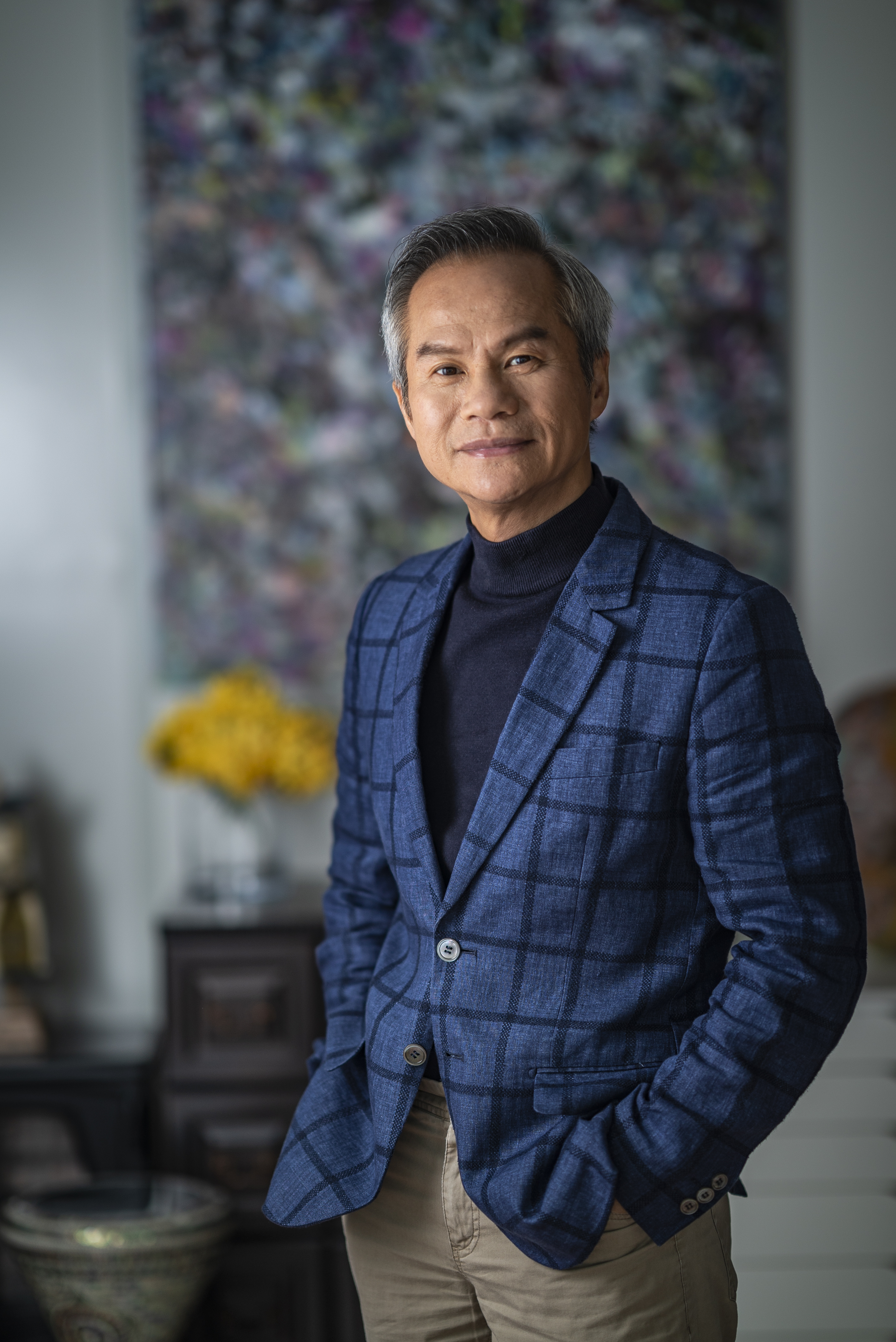
- Born: British Hong Kong
- Education: Queen's College, Hong Kong Faculty of Law, The University of Hong Kong - HKU Master Degree of Drama, Université de la Sorbonne Nouvelle
- Occupations: Theatre Director, Actor and Educator

Tang Shu-wing (Chinese: 鄧樹榮) is a theatre director, actor and educator in Hong Kong, having worked in professional theatre for 30 years. Sometimes nicknamed the "Alchemist of Minimalist Theatre", he received the Best Director award three times at the Hong Kong Drama Awards. While studying law in the early 1980s, Tang acted in student productions. He is the Dean of Drama at the Hong Kong Academy for Performing Arts. Parole Magazine describes Tang as "one of the most talented theatre directors of Hong Kong". He has done more than 60 works, including spoken drama, non-verbal theatre, dance drama and opera.

== Career ==
Tang Shu-wing was born in Hong Kong, and although he was keen on pursuing studies related to history, debating and medicine, he finally decided to study theatre at the Université de la Sorbonne Nouvelle and acting at the Ecole de la Belle de Mai, both in Paris, France; "Woyzeck" by German playwright Georg Büchner was his inspiration. Returning to his home country in 1992, he established the company, No Man's Land, in 1997; its productions include puppetry, video, and multimedia. Tang serves as the Hong Kong Academy of Performing Arts' Dean of Drama.

In May 2012, he put on a production of Shakespeare's "Titus Andronicus" which premiered at the World Shakespeare Festival, Globe to Globe. It brought out the first Cantonese performance on stage. The original play was made into a narrative format with Asian aesthetics of movement and music, which was titled "Titus 2.0", and presented in Fredrikstad, Norway, Bytom and Wrocław, Poland, and Beijing. Later in 2012, the Tang Shu-wing Theatre Studio produced "Detention", a "non-verbal physical comedy", a new theatrical style in Hong Kong. Its repertoire includes acrobatics, martial arts, Chinese opera movement and percussion. It was presented at the Edinburgh Festival in August 2012 and received critical acclaim. Stage Magazine said of it: "Fringe triumph… very inventive and highly amusing show."

The Tang Shu-wing Theatre Studio returned to London, where they'd performed during the Cultural Olympiad, for Globe to Globe 2015. They presented a production of "Macbeth" in Cantonese, infused by the culture of Hong Kong, at Shakespeare's Globe theatre in August. A further run will follow at Hong Kong's City Hall in March 2016. The Financial Times praised the actor's performances, accompanying music and, though its pared-down status was felt to dampen the narrative pace, concluded the production had a "bewitching hypnotic grace".

== Theatre works ==
=== Director ===
- The Days of the Commune (1993)
- Die Affäre Rue de Lourcine (1993)
- In the Heat of the Night (1994)
- A Monologue on the Line of Handover (1995)
- The Bald Soprano (1995)
- The Double Bass (1995)
- The Broken Edges of a Mirror (1996)
- The Miser (1996)
- A Wedding Banquet for the Victoria Harbour (1997)
- Shanghai Blues (1997)
- Three Women in Pearl River Delta (1997)
- Face (1998)
- Millennium Autopsy (1999)
- My Murder Story (1999)
- Play the Old City (1999)
- Once Upon a Time in Wong Uk (2000)
- The Hour We Knew Nothing of Each Other (2000)
- Hong Kong at War (2001)
- The Alchemist (2001)
- Between Life and Death [Cantonese Version] (2002)
- Deathwatch (2002)
- Guan-yin: She Who Sees the Cries of the Universe (2002, 2005)
- The Two or Three Ways of Making Love around Sunset (2003)
- Between Life and Death [English Version] (2003)
- The Man, The Chair and The Turtle (2004, 2005)
- The No Man's Land of New China (2004)
- Desiring Samsara (2005)
- Kiss of the Spider Woman (2005)
- Phaedra (2005, 2007)
- Hamlet (2006)
- Princess Changping (2007)
- Le Dindon (2008)
- The Other Shore (2008)
- The Exception and the Rule (2008)
- Titus Andronicus (2008, 2012)
- Princess Changping [Dance] (2009)
- King Arthur (2009)
- Rubik's Cube (2010)
- Next Generation (2010)
- Detention (2011–2015)
- Thunderstorm (2012, 2013, 2015, 2017, 2019)
- Datong (2015、2017)
- Macbeth (2015–2019)
- Antigone (2016, 2017)
- Dead Man's Cell Phone (2018, 2019)
- The Tales of Hoffmann (2018)
- Idomeneo (2021)
- Scenes from a Marriage (2021)
- Larger Than Life (2021)
- King Lear (2021)

=== Actor ===
- Miss Margarida’s Way (1993)
- Two Civil Servants in a Skyscraper (1993, 1994)
- My Dinner with Andre (1993)
- Curry Chicken (1994)
- No Man's Land (1996)
- Dream City (1998)
- Sunshine Station (2002)
- Miss Margarida's Way [Mandarin Version] (2003)
- Genesis [Dance] (2005)
- Hedda Gabler (2014)
- Why aren't you Steve Jobs? (2014)
