= Hong Kong Repertory Theatre =

Theatre company in Hong Kong

Hong Kong Repertory Theatre (Chinese: 香港話劇團) is the oldest and largest professional theatre company in Hong Kong. Founded in 1977, it is registered as a non-profit organisation: some of its funding comes from the government. Among its repertoire are many well-known Chinese and international stage works. Most are performed in Cantonese. The theatre company also aims to bring new Western theatre concepts and skills to the audience.

== Leadership and history ==
The first Artistic Director of the Hong Kong Repertory Theatre was Dr. Daniel Yang (tenure: 1983–1985, 1990–2001), followed by Dr. Joanna Chan (tenure: 1986–1990) and Fredric Mao (tenure: 2002–2008).

In March 2008, veteran theatre maker Anthony Chan, who taught at the Hong Kong Academy for Performing Arts for nearly twenty years, officially took over as Artistic Director. In 2023, Poon Wai-sum, the former Dean of the School of Drama at the Hong Kong Academy for Performing Arts, succeeded Chan as the sixth Artistic Director. The current Executive Director is Marble Leung.

== Notable works ==
The company has performed over 280 local original plays and adaptations of Chinese and international classics. Some of their most notable works include:

- I Have a Date with Spring (我和春天有個約會)
- The Mad Phoenix (南海十三郎)
- A Dream Like a Dream (如夢之夢)
- The Top Restaurant (天下第一樓)
- Boundless Movement (遍地芳菲)
