= Hong Kong Academy for Performing Arts =

Tertiary arts school in Hong Kong

Coordinates: 22°16′49″N 114°10′10″E

- 香港演藝學院
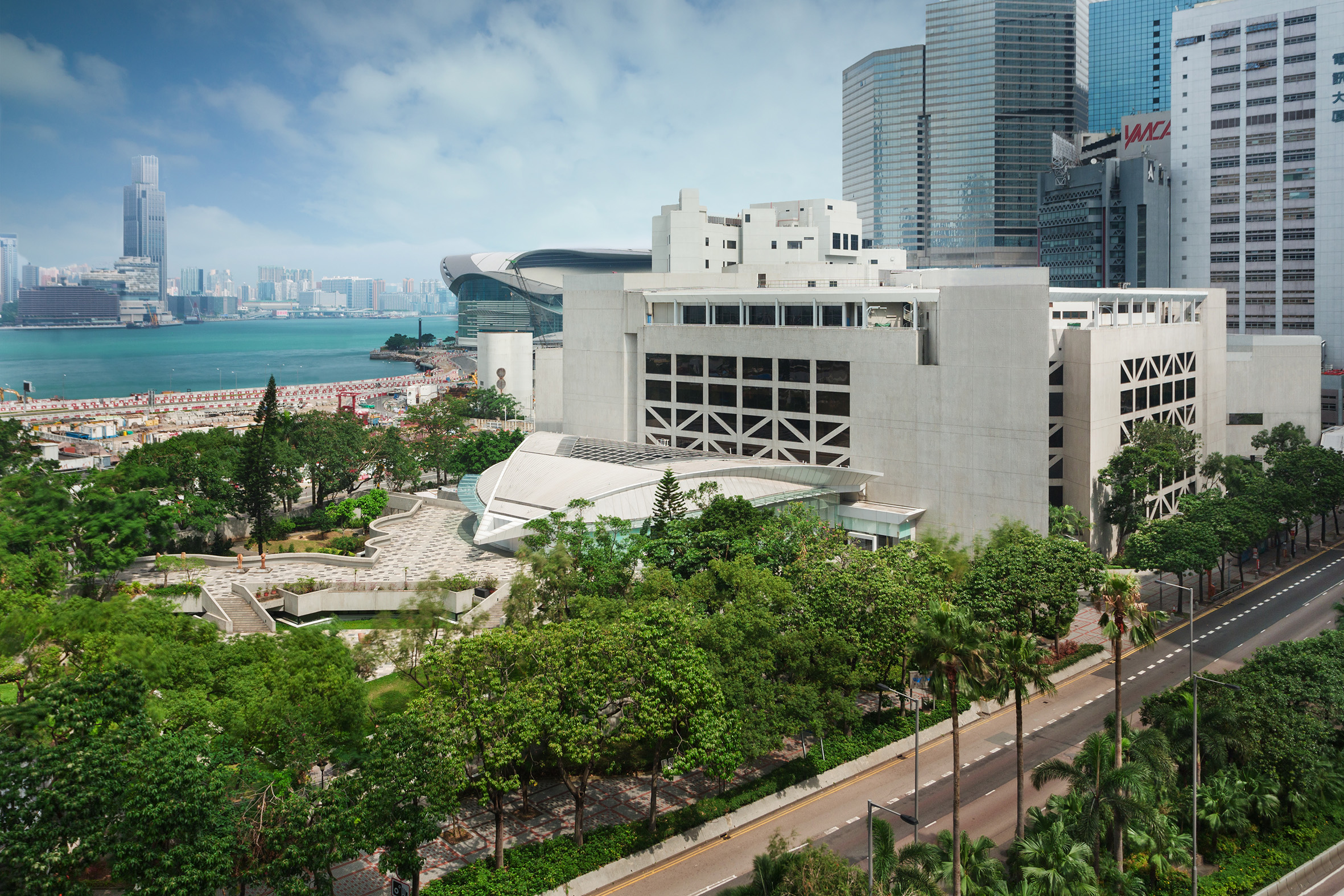
- The Main Campus of The Hong Kong Academy for Performing Arts in Wan Chai, Hong Kong in October 2018
- Type: Public
- Established: 1984; 42 years ago
- Chairman: Symon WONG Yu-wing MH
- Chancellor: John Lee Ka-chiu
- Director: Anna CY Chan
- Undergraduates: 790
- Postgraduates: 141
- Other students: 1130
- Location: No. 1 Gloucester Road, Wan Chai, Hong Kong
- Campus: Urban
- Website: www.hkapa.edu

Chinese name
- Traditional Chinese: 香港演藝學院
- Simplified Chinese: 香港演艺学院
Transcriptions
Standard Mandarin
- Hanyu Pinyin: Xiānggǎng Yǎnyì Xuéyuàn
Yue: Cantonese
- Yale Romanization: Hēunggóng Yínngaih Hohkyuhn
- Jyutping: Hoeng1gong2 Jin2ngai6 Hok6jyun2

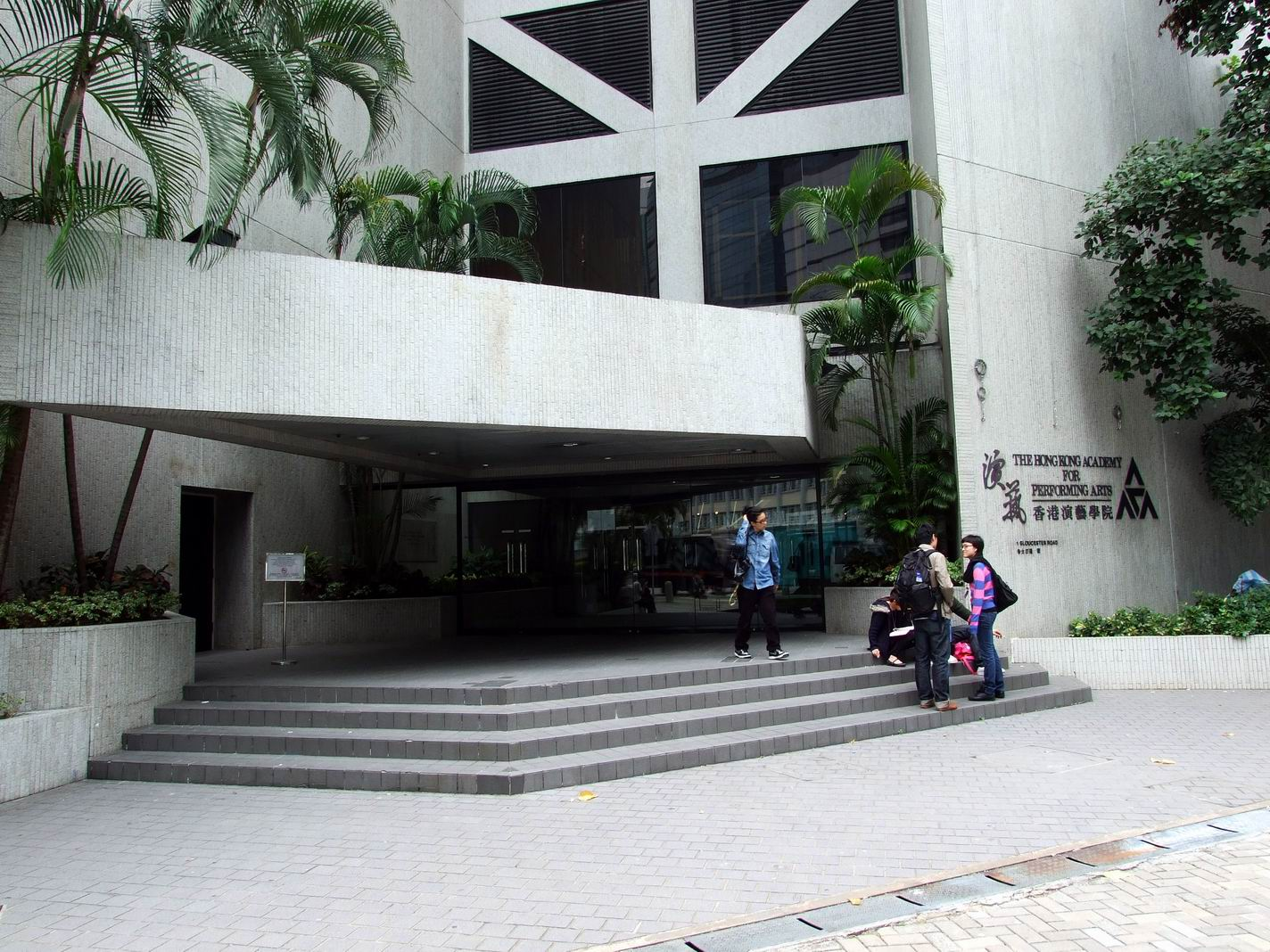
Entrance in November 2007

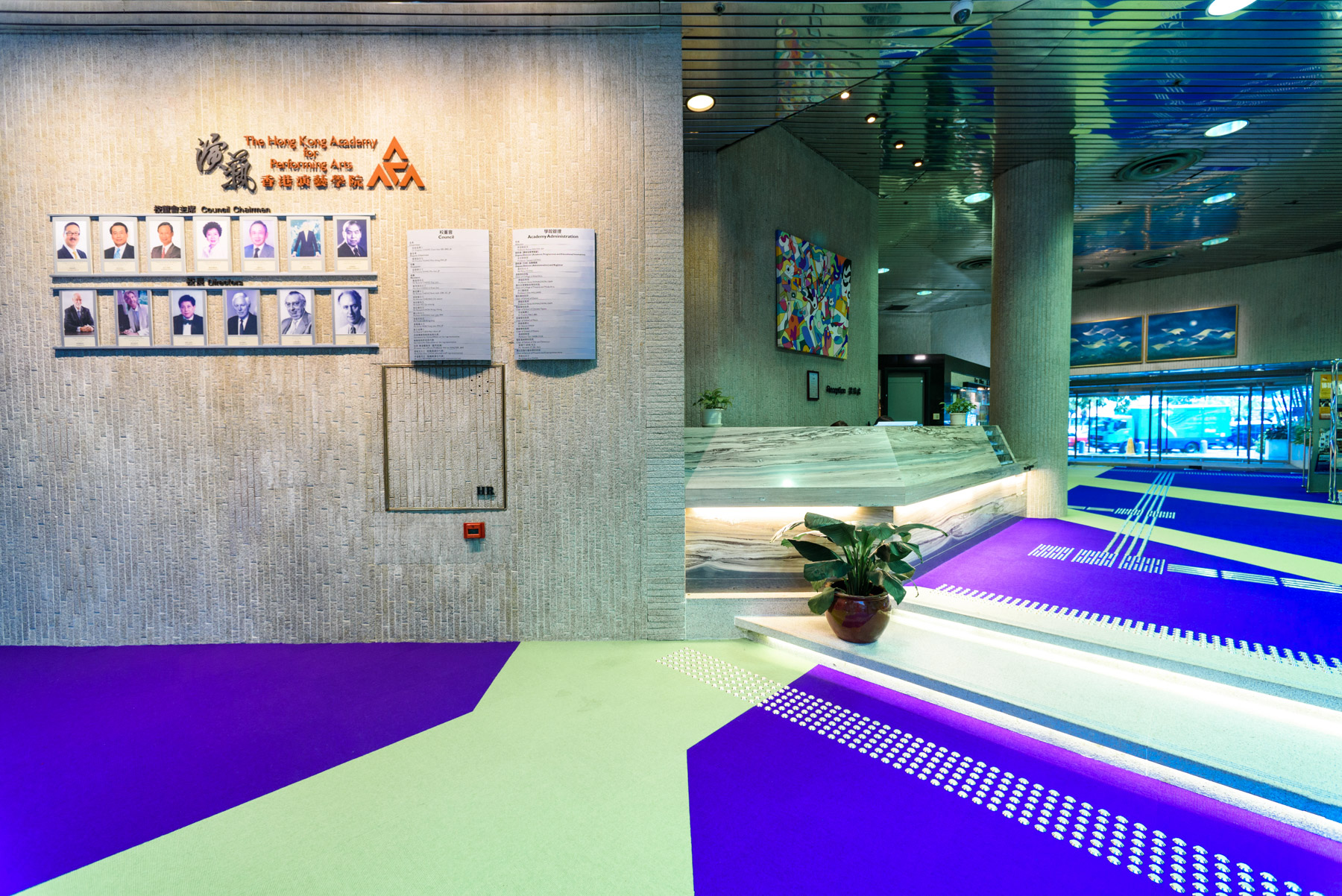
Lobby in August 2016

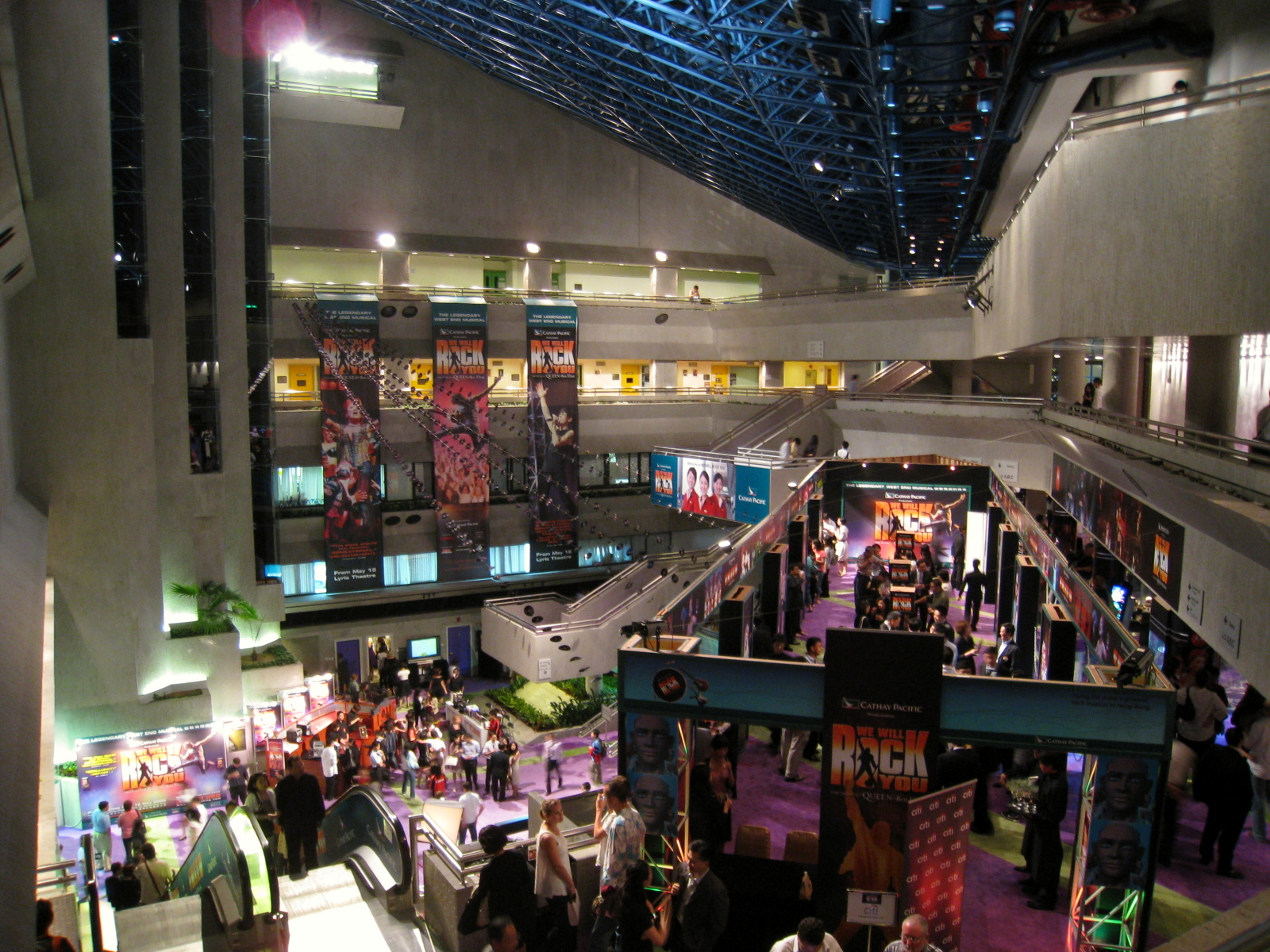
Campus atrium in June 2008

The Hong Kong Academy for Performing Arts (HKAPA) is a public higher education institution in Wan Chai, Hong Kong Island, Hong Kong.

Located near the north coast of Wan Chai on Hong Kong Island, the main campus also functions as a venue for performances. Bethanie, which is the site of the institution's Landmark Heritage Campus in Pok Fu Lam, has housed the School of Film and Television since 2007.

The Academy provides practice-based and professional diploma, advanced diploma, undergraduate and postgraduate studies in Chinese opera, dance, drama, film and television, music, and theatre and entertainment arts. Its educational policy reflects the cultural diversity of Hong Kong with an emphasis on Chinese and Western traditions and interdisciplinary learning. In the 2026 QS World University rankings, the Academy ranks 10th for Performing Arts and 1st in Asia.

Every year, the Academy enrolls approximately 750 students for its full-time programmes and around 770 students for its Junior Music Programme and Gifted Young Dancer Programme.

== History ==
In early 1981, the Royal Hong Kong Jockey Club informed Governor Murray MacLehose that it was willing to fund another project of a comparable scale to its recent major undertakings, which included the Ocean Park and the Jubilee Sports Centre. The government responded with a proposal to develop an academy for the performing arts. The Academy would complement the performing arts spaces being opened across the territory by the Urban Council, and provide opportunities for creative youth just as the Jubilee Sports Centre was developed to serve young sportspeople.

On 15 September 1981, the Jockey Club formally announced plans to build the Academy on a piece of vacant land in Wan Chai, granted by the government, between HMS Tamar and the Hong Kong Arts Centre. The academy was established in 1984. In the early 1990s, the Academy became a degree-granting institution.

The main campus was designed by local firm Simon Kwan and Associates, who were among six firms invited to submit designs in a limited competition. It comprises the Academy Block, the Theatre Block, and the Administration Block. The Administration Block was ready for occupation in July 1985. The Academy Block was formally opened on 18 September 1985 by Governor Edward Youde. The Theatre Block was opened by the Duchess of Kent on 3 February 1986, the same day the inaugural opera season began as part of the 1986 Hong Kong Arts Festival. The 1981 model produced for the architectural competition is now held by the M+ museum.

In 2006 the Academy established a second campus at Béthanie in Pok Fu Lam. It mainly houses specialist facilities for the School of Film and Television.

The original campus was designed for a student population of 600 students. The Academy has been facing space constraints as enrolment has gradually risen, prompting planning for campus expansion. The 334 Scheme further exacerbated the problem. In June 2012 the Legislative Council approved funding of $444.8 million for construction of a nine-storey annex block, and other campus improvements, presently under construction. The expansion will house classrooms, studios, laboratories, music rooms, offices, workshops and support facilities.

The Academy is working with the West Kowloon Cultural District on education plans and venue usage.

== Governance ==
The Academy is governed under The Hong Kong Academy for Performing Arts Ordinance, passed in 1984 by the Legislative Council. Under the legislation the academy is mandated to "foster and provide for training, education and research in the performing arts and related technical arts". The governing body of the institution is called the Council of The Hong Kong Academy for Performing Arts, which is responsible for appointing a director, who oversees the day-to-day operation of the academy.

The Academy is funded through tuition fees as well as a subvention provided by the Culture, Sports and Tourism Bureau. This arrangement differs from most other post-secondary institutions in the territory, which are funded by the University Grants Committee.

Kevin Thompson was director of the Academy from 2004 to 2012. During his tenure the institute forged international links, including arrangements with the Juilliard School in New York City as well as mainland colleges, and introduced master's degrees in performing arts disciplines. Thompson also initiated planning for campus expansion. Professor Adrian Walter, was recruited in 2012. He had been the dean of music at the Australian National University in Canberra since 2008. Professor Gillian Choa succeeded as the new director of the academy with effect from 1 January 2021. Professor Choa was the first female director since the establishment of the academy in 1984. Professor Anna CY Chan has been appointed the eighth Director of the Academy since April 2025.

== Academic units ==
The Academy offers academic programmes from diploma/foundation to master's degree level in six Schools:

- School of Chinese Opera
- School of Dance
- School of Drama
- School of Film and Television
- School of Music
- School of Theatre and Entertainment Arts

== Facilities ==
- Lyric Theatre, with 1,181 seats.
- Rita Tong Liu Drama Theatre, with 415 seats.
- Concert Hall, with 382 seats.
- Recital Hall, with 134–202 seats
- Studio Theatre, with 120–240 seats
- Béthanie Theatre at the Béthanie Campus
- Hong Kong Jockey Club Amphitheatre, 600 seats

== Notable alumni ==
- Power Chan, television and film actor
- Sunny Chan, television and film actor
- Louis Cheung, Cantopop recording-artist, songwriter, and actor
- Rachel Cheung, pianist
- Cheung Tat-ming, actor, comedian, director, and writer
- Jim Chim, actor and comedian
- Candace Chong Mui Ngam, playwright
- Athena Chu, actress and singer
- Candy Chu, actress for the Hong Kong TVB television station
- Katy Kung, actress
- Gigi Lai, actress and Cantopop singer
- Joey Leung, actor
- Charmaine Li, actress with Television Broadcasts Limited
- Alan Mak, filmmaker
- Yan Yan Mak, director
- Marco Ngai, actor
- Kearen Pang, actress, writer
- Louisa So, actress in drama and TV series
- Sun Wai-Keung, stage and television actor
- Gem Tang Zhi-kei, singer-songwriter and actress
- Anthony Wong, actor, screenwriter and film director
- Wong Cho-lam, stage and television actor and stage director
- Mandy Wong, television actress
- Tak Chiu Wong, saxophonist
- Neo Yau, actor
- Yvonne Yung, actress
- Rebecca Zhu, actress

== See also ==
- Education in Hong Kong
- List of higher education institutions in Hong Kong
- List of buildings and structures in Hong Kong
