= Kong Yu-kau =

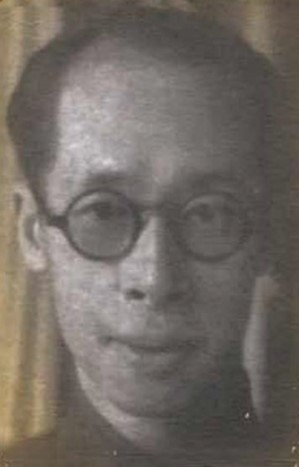
Namhoi Sap‑saam‑long (1940s)

Kong Yu-kau (Chinese: 江譽鏐, aka 江譽球; 3 March 1910 – 6 May 1984), courtesy name Gong‑haa (絳霞), literary sobriquet Master of Siu‑Laan‑jai (小蘭齋主), and later Nam Hoi Kong Fung (南海江楓), was better known by his Cantonese opera stage name Nam Hoi Sap-Saam Long (南海十三郎; lit. "The Thirteenth Gentleman of Nam Hoi"). He was popularly called Kong Sap‑saam (江十三) or Sap‑saam‑go (十三哥; lit. Thirteen Brother). Born in Guangzhou, his ancestral home was Ha Long Village (下塱村), Nam Hoi County (now Nanhai, Foshan), Guangdong. He was one of the most notable Cantonese opera playwrights active in Guangdong and Hong Kong during the 1930s.

== Life ==
=== Early life ===
Kong Yu-kau was the thirteenth son of Kong Hung‑yan, a Hanlin scholar of the late Qing dynasty. His mother, Dou Saulaan, the sixth concubine of Jiang Kongyin, died shortly after giving birth to him on Conggui West Street in Huangsha, Guangzhou. He was subsequently raised by his aunt, Madam Zhou. At the age of two, he briefly followed his father to Hong Kong, living at 75 Caine Road, before returning to the family residence, the “Taishi Di” (太史第), located in Tongde Lane, Henan District, Guangzhou.

During childhood, Kong studied at the private “Laan Jai Family School” (蘭齋私塾, aka 蘭齋家塾) within the Taishi Di, learning the classics and histories under renowned scholars such as Ho Tin-fu (何天輔) and Chan Gwai-saang (陳桂生). At ten, he entered Nanmo Primary School (南武小學), studying under Wu Fung-choeng (胡鳳昌). He later attended the Lingnan University Affiliated Middle School (private), the Guangzhou Sino‑German Private School, Hong Kong College of Preceptors, and Wah Yan College, before entering the University of Hong Kong as a medical student. According to Hong Kong actor‑director Lo Dun, Kong was a classmate of Liao Chengzhi, later a prominent Communist Party figure and diplomat, during his time at Lingnan University’s affiliated middle school. Kong also converted to Christianity and was baptized during his early years in Guangzhou, influenced by the religious background of his schools.

In 1924, the Hong Kong College of Preceptors invited the "Universal Music & Drama Troupe" (寰球樂劇團) for a charity performance. Its leader, Ho Hao‑chuen, commissioned Kong to write a script. Kong adapted Shakespeare’s comedy As You Like It into the Cantonese opera Sounds of the flute on a Cold Night, marking his first Cantonese opera script.

=== Golden Era of Career ===
In 1929, Kong joined the first troupe of “Kok Sin Sing,” founded by the famous Cantonese opera star Sit Kok‑sin (薛覺先), and adopted the stage name "Nanhai Shisanlang" (The Thirteenth Gentleman of Nanhai). That same year, he withdrew from the University of Hong Kong intending to transfer to Peking Union Medical College, but instead remained in Shanghai until returning to Guangzhou in 1932. In 1930, his play Echoes of the Heart’s Tears made him famous in Guangdong and Hong Kong. After Guangzhou fell to Japanese forces in 1938, Kong fled with his family to Hong Kong. He lived with a woman and fathered a daughter, later named Wong Guk-sheung (黃菊霜). In 1939, Chiu Yu-lam (趙如琳) invited him to Guangdong to join the Provincial Academy of Arts, where he wrote anti‑Japanese Cantonese operas such as Song Beneath the Battle Tent (平戎帳下歌).

In 1940, Li Han‑hun, then Chairman of the Guangdong Provincial Government, appointed Jiang as a "Wartime Provincial Councillor." Kong adopted a new literary name, "Nanhai Kong Fung" (南海江楓). The following year, he travelled north to Qujiang and collaborated with actor Kwan Tak-hing (stage name "Sun Leung Chau") on scriptwriting. He returned to Guangzhou in August 1945. Soon afterward, friends invited him to Hong Kong to help run a newspaper. Six months later, while travelling by train back to Guangzhou, he was suddenly pushed off the train near Luogang, suffering head and spinal injuries. He was hospitalized at the Guangzhou Red Cross Hospital in Henan District.

=== Tragic Decline ===
In 1949, Kong Yu-kau returned to rural Nanhai County to live. Later that winter, he went to Central District in Hong Kong and stayed at the Antler Hotel on Queen’s Road Central (the site is now Antler Building). He subsequently moved to Fenwick Street and the Hennessy Road area in Wan Chai. In 1953 and again in 1959, he was admitted to the High Street Mental Hospital. In 1961, he was sent to Castle Peak Hospital, from which he was discharged in March the following year. During these years, Kong was often escorted to psychiatric treatment by his niece Kong Duen-yee (江端儀), who had by then founded the New Testament Church. Because of his periods of homelessness in Hong Kong and repeated hospitalizations, and under Kong Duen-yee’s influence, he once again embraced Christianity for a time.^{:146–147}

In 1964, he wrote newspaper columns for Kung Sheung Evening News and other publications. These writings were later compiled in 2017 by Hong Kong writer and Cantonese opera scholar Chu Siu‑cheung (朱少璋) into a three‑volume set titled Miscellanies from Little Orchid Study (小蘭齋雜記).

In 1970, through the recommendation of Chi Lin Nunnery (慈祥法師), founder of Buddhist Tai Kwong Middle School (now Delia School of Tai Kwong), the abbot of Po Lin Monastery on Lantau Island, Venerable Sik Fat Ho (釋筏可), learned of Kong’s destitute circumstances. Out of compassion, Fat Ho permitted Kong to reside at Po Lin Monastery and appointed him as a reception steward (commonly known as 知客), responsible for receiving visitors and guiding guests around the monastery’s scenic sites. In 1976, Kong was again admitted to Castle Peak Hospital. In 1984, suffering from a general medical illness, he was transferred from Castle Peak Hospital to Princess Margaret Hospital, where he passed away on 6 May at the age of seventy‑four.

== Relationship with Tik-Sang Tong ==
Whether Nam Hoi Sap‑saam‑long (Kong Yu-kau) and Tong Tik‑sang (Tong Dik-sang; 唐滌生) were formally master and disciple has long been debated. In 1983, Hong Kong Cantonese opera scriptwriter Leung Shan‑yan (梁山人), who had worked with Tong, stated on RTHK’s programme Echoes of Tong Tik-sang's Operatic Legacy (唐滌生戲曲迴響) that Tong had two teachers: Fung Chi‑fan (馮志芬) and Nam Hoi Sap‑saam‑long. The programme host added that Tong’s widow Cheng Mang‑ha (鄭孟霞) also identified Sap‑saam‑long as Tong’s teacher. Cantonese music writer Wong Yuet‑sang (王粵生) echoed this view.

However, others disagreed. Kong Ho (江河), who had copied music manuscripts for Sap‑saam‑long, argued that the two men were friends rather than teacher and student. He noted that before WWII, everyone, including Tong, called Sap‑saam‑long "Sap‑saam‑gor" (十三哥). After the war, Tong continued to address him this way, and even when Tong later became famous, he simply called him "Sap‑saam." Sap‑saam‑long, in turn, affectionately called Tong "Ah Tong." To Kong Ho, this mutual address showed camaraderie, not hierarchy.

To clarify the matter, writer and Cantonese opera scholar Chu Siu‑cheung (朱少璋) collected Sap‑saam‑long’s 1960s newspaper columns for Kung Shang Evening News and other papers, publishing them in three volumes as Miscellanies from Little Orchid Study (小蘭齋雜記, 2017). Tong Tik‑sang had already died in 1959, yet Sap‑saam‑long repeatedly wrote "my disciple Tong Tik‑sang" (弟子唐滌生) in articles from the 1960s. Chu therefore concluded that Tong had two teachers: Fung Chi‑fan and Sap‑saam‑long, though he also noted that no clear evidence shows any direct artistic transmission between them.

In 2021, Cantonese opera star Yuen Siu‑fai (阮兆輝) stated that Sap‑saam‑long’s own writings indeed show he called Tong his disciple, and Yuen personally recalled Sap‑saam‑long verbally advising Tong. But whether the two ever performed a formal bai‑si (拜師) ceremony remains unknown.

In 2024, Cantonese opera scholar Chan Sau‑yan (陳守仁), in The Creative Legend of Tong Tik‑sang, Revised Edition (唐滌生創作傳奇增訂版), argued that Tong was definitively the disciple of Fung Chi‑fan, and, given the strict seniority system in Cantonese opera troupes, Tong should be regarded as Sap‑saam‑long’s "grand‑disciple". Chan found no concrete evidence that Tong ever received systematic instruction from Sap‑saam‑long.

== Works ==
=== Cantonese Opera ===
Kong Yu-kau wrote Cantonese opera scripts for well over 15 different troupes:

==== Foshan–Guangzhou touring troupes (multiple) ====
- Fishing in the Snow on the Cold River (寒江釣雪)
- Night Theft of Red Silk (夜盜紅綃)

==== Kok Sin Sing Opera Troupe ====
- The Golden Powder Thief of the Bronze Citadel (銅城金粉盜),
- Who Is the Heartless One? — The Sequel (誰是負心人續篇),
- Sweet Girl (女兒香),
- Cherishing Blossoms Yet Failing to Protect Them (惜花不護花),
- Half a Life as a Slave to Rouge and Powder (半生脂粉奴),
- The Flower Market (花市),
- Whose Heart Holds the Heavier Spring Longing? (春思落誰多),
- Fragrance Grows Richer in the Cold and Lonely Places (幽香冷處濃),
- Biting Through the Cold Frontier Moon (咬碎寒關月),
- A Priceless Spring Night (無價春宵),
- Voices of the Heart, Shadows of Tears (心聲淚影),
- Rouge and Golden Spears (紅粉金戈),
- The Scent That Draws the Heart (引情香),
- Moon over the Chun Wai River (秦淮月),
- Pear Fragrance Courtyard (梨香院),
- Fragrant Quilt under the Bright Moon (明月香衾),
- The Crape Myrtle Blossom and Her Crape Myrtle Lover (紫薇花對紫薇郎),
- The Flower Spirit at the Brink of Spring’s End (花魂春欲斷), etc...

==== Global Amusement Troupe (寰球樂劇團) ====
- The Sound of the Flute on a Bitterly Cold Night (寒夜簫聲)

==== Dai Kong Nam Troupe (大江南劇團) ====
- Chronicle of the Heroic Martyrs of the Ming Dynasty's Palace (明宮英烈傳),
- Fallen Petals, Crimson on the Ground (殘花落地紅),
- Ask Not Where I Must Return (莫問儂歸處), etc...

==== Yuk Tong Chun Troupe (玉堂春劇團) ====
- Blood Stains the Bronze Palace (血染銅宮), etc...

==== Times Theatre Troupe (時代劇團) ====
- Thunderstorm (雷雨)

===== Yi King Tin Troupe (義擎天劇團) =====
- Seventy‑Two Copper Fortresses (七十二銅城),
- Swallows Return, But the Person Has Not Returned (燕歸人未歸),
- The Songstress of the Far Horizon (天涯歌女),
- The Drifting Young Noble (漂泊王孫),
- When Blossoms Fall and Spring Returns No More (花落春歸去),
- Blood Debts Repaid in Blood (血債血償),
- A Brotherhood That Holds Up the Heavens (義結擎天),
- From Heartless to Heartfelt (無情了有情),
- The Pitiful Night at the Ancient Pagoda (古塔可憐宵), etc...

==== Man Nin Ching Troupe (萬年青劇團) ====
- Thirsting to Drink the Blood of the Hung Nou (渴飲匈奴血),
- Tonight, As It Was Last Year (去年今夕), etc...

==== Hing Chung Wah Troupe (興中華劇團) ====
- The White Tiger Challenges the Mystic Altar (白虎戲玄壇),
- The Iron Hooves and Red Blood Over Beijing (燕市鐵蹄紅),
- The Eight‑Formation Battle Array (八陣圖),
- The Taiping Heavenly Kingdom (太平天國),
- Lady Golden Phoenix and General Nian Gengyao (金鳳池與年羹堯), etc...

==== Dai Lo Tin Troupe (大羅天劇團) ====
- Moon over Shanghai (黃浦月), etc...

==== Sing Kwong Ming Troupe (勝光明劇團) ====
- When Shall the Debts of Love Be Repaid? (花債何時了), etc...

==== Tai Ping Troupe (太平劇團) ====
- Legends of Victoria Peak (太平山傳奇),
- Neither for Tears nor Laughter (啼笑皆非),
- The Red Steed and the Cloud‑like Tresses (赤馬雲鬟), etc...

==== Kam Tim Fa (錦添花劇團) ====
- Subduing Jiang Wei (伏姜維),
- The Red Hawk of the Sea (海上紅鷹),
- Crossing the Seas to Slay the Dragon (跨海屠龍),
- The Crimson Knight‑Errant (紅俠),
- Cutting Across the Waters of the Yangtze (橫斷長江水),
- Do Not Betray Your Youth (莫負少年頭), etc...

==== Sing Lei Lin (勝利年劇團) ====
- Plum Blossoms on the Purple Frontier (紫塞梅花),
- The Ruins of the Late Tang and the Five Dynasties (五代殘唐),
- A Talent for Ten Thousand Generations (萬世才人),
- The Lone Minister at the Edge of the Sea (海角孤臣),
- Song Beneath the War‑Pacifying Banner (平戎帳下歌),
- Joining the Army to Continue the Old Song (從戎續舊歌), etc...

==== Kwan Tak-hing National Salvation Cantonese Opera Troupe (關德興救亡粵劇團) ====
- Annals of Loyalty and Righteousness (節義春秋),
- Song of the Swallow (燕歌行),
- Chan Tse Jong (陳子壯),
- Hung Suen‑kiu (洪宣嬌), etc...

==== Others ====
- Grooming and Gazing at the Yellow River (梳洗望黃河),
- Twenty‑Four Bridges of Jiangnan (江南廿四橋),
- Silver Armor Partially Scented with Feminine Cosmetics (銀鎧半脂香),
- The Trap of a Beautiful Woman is a Portal to Death (美人關是鬼門關),
- Turning Fragrant Incense into the Ashes of Vengeance (香化復仇灰),
- Lee Heung Kwan (李香君),
- Leung Hung Yuk (梁紅玉),
- Tragedy of the Tortured City (孤城血花淚),
- Love Reaches its Peak, Yet the Night is Far from Over (情央夜未央),
- The World's Most Contemptible Man (天下賤丈夫),
- The Peacock Flies to the Southeast (孔雀東南飛),
- Chiu Fei Yin (趙飛燕),
- Lau Pak Wan (劉伯溫),
- The Soldiers Beneath the Peach Blossom Fan (桃花扇底兵),
- The Kadupul Blossom in Fairyland (仙境曇花), etc...

=== Films ===
Kong Yu-kau participated in nearly twenty films, mainly as a screenwriter and director, and also appeared in supporting roles:

- The Lonely Sacrifice (寂寞的犧牲, 1929, screenwriter)
- A Daughter’s Debt (女兒債, 1936, screenwriter, and director)
- Man of All Evil (萬惡之夫, 1937, screenwriter, and director)
- War and Survival (百戰餘生, 1937, screenwriter, and director)
- Born with a Silver Spoon (公子哥兒, 1937, screenwriter)
- At This Crucial Juncture (最後關頭, 1938, screenwriter, and director)^{:146}
- Sweet Girl (女兒香, 1939, screenwriter and director)
- The Life of a Song Girl (一代名花花影恨, 1940, screenwriter, and director)
- Theft of the Red Pongee (aka Night Theft of Red Silk, 夜盜紅綃, 1940, screenwriter, and director)
- The Valiant General (趙子龍, 1940, screenwriter, and director)
- Goddess of the Streets (花街神女, 1941, screenwriter)
- The Good Father (天涯慈父, 1941, screenwriter)
- Sweet Girl, Remake (新女兒香, 1953, screenwriter)
- The Princess of Angkor Wat (南國麗人, 1958, supporting actor)
- Voices of the Heart, Shadows of Tears (心聲淚影, 1962，screenwriter）
- An Inch Land Is A Token of Warm Blood (一寸山河一寸血, 1972，actor)

== Anecdotes ==
The following anecdotes about Namhai Sap‑Saam‑Long are excerpted chronologically from Miscellaneous Notes from the Little Orchid Study (小蘭齋雜記) and the Decline of the Once‑Prestigious Taishi Di (滄桑太史第):

- In early 1920, while studying at Nanmo Primary School, Kong Yiu‑kau offended a friend of the headmaster. He then set fire to the headmaster’s mosquito net and was expelled from the school.
- During the 1930s, after Sap‑Saam‑Long became famous in Guangdong and Hong Kong, every Cantonese opera he wrote would prominently display the name "Namhoi Sap‑Saam‑Long" at the top of the programme, so prominently that even the name of the era’s superstar Sit Kok‑sin appeared after his.
- In the mid‑1930s, Sit Kok‑sin personally visited the Kong's Taishi Di residence to thank Sap‑Saam‑Long. Sit wore a blue cotton long gown and was accompanied by a group of musicians. Sap‑Saam‑Long led him into the main hall to taste the Kong family's famous Taishi Five‑Snake Soup (太史五蛇羹; In Hong Kong, Snake Soup is called "Taishi Five‑Snake Soup" because it was named after Kong Taishi, the father of Namhai Sap‑Saam‑Long.). After the meal, Sit Kok‑sin sang a song in person—the theme song Fishing in the Snow on the Cold River (寒江釣雪) from Sap‑Saam‑Long’s first celebrated opera Voices of the Heart, Shadows of Tears (心聲淚影).
- In 1934, Wai Chun‑chau (衛春秋) of Spring and Autumn magazine wrote a novel titled Spring deep within the Taishi Residence (春深太史第), which satirised the Kong family. Upon investigation, Kong Hung‑yan discovered that Sap‑saam‑long had leaked family scandals to Yeung Dai‑ming (楊大明), the supplement editor of Wah Kiu Yat Po. Yeung then passed the material to Wai Chun‑chau, who embellished it into the published story. Kong Hung‑yan reprimanded and lectured Sap‑Saam‑Long using passages from the Doctrine of the Mean and the "Kong Family Ancestral Instructions" (江氏祖訓).
- In 1935, Sap‑Saam‑Long met actress Lam Suet‑dip (林雪蝶) while filming the movie A Daughter’s Debt (女兒債). Their relationship deepened, and the two families arranged an engagement. Lam Suet‑dip even adopted the sobriquet "Sap‑Saam‑Neung" (lit. The wife of Sap-Saam). Ultimately, however, the couple did not marry due to incompatible personalities.
- In the 1940s, playwright Yam Wu‑fa (任護花) wrote an erotic Cantonese opera titled Lou‑gwan (勞軍). Yam’s wife also performed in his erotic productions, dancing provocatively and revealing her thighs. After reading the script, Sap‑Saam‑Long became furious and publicly rebuked Yam Wu‑fa. He later petitioned Li Hanhun, then Chairman of the Guangdong Provincial Government, to ban erotic performances for the troops. However, military affairs were under Yu Hanmou, so Li could not fulfil Sap‑Saam‑Long’s request. In fact, Sap‑Saam‑Long and Yam Wu‑fa had already begun a "literary duel" (文鬥) in the 1930s: Yam wrote Fury Swallowing Twelve Cities (怒吞十二城), to which Sap‑saam‑long responded with Twenty‑Four Bridges of Jiangnan (江南廿四橋). Yam then wrote Thirty‑Six Labyrinths (三十六迷宮), and Sap‑saam‑long countered with Seventy‑Two Copper Fortresses (七十二銅城).
- On 26 October 1953, Sap‑Saam‑Long stood at a crossroads near Ko Shing Tea House (高陞茶樓) on Queen’s Road Central, loudly lecturing passers‑by on current affairs. A large crowd gathered. The police took him to Wan Chai Police Station No. 2 for questioning. Determining that he was suffering a mental episode, they transferred him to the High Street Mental Hospital.
- In the 1960s, Sap‑Saam‑Long once telephoned the police in Wan Chai to report that his shoes had gone missing. When asked who had stolen them, he replied that two men were responsible—but the police dared not arrest them. The reason: Mao Zedong had stolen his left shoe, and Chiang Kai-shek had stolen his right shoe, so he "could not walk on either side."

Cantonese opera virtuoso Franco Yuen (阮兆輝) has also recalled several anecdotes about Sap‑Saam‑Long, including the following:

- Sap Sam Long's later years were a far cry from the ragged, filthy, and disheveled image portrayed in stage plays and film adaptations. Yuen, who had met him in person, described several striking features: he wore round‑framed glasses; his eyes were bright and sharp; he had a thick beard; he wore an old-fashioned Western-style suit, and even a tie. Although his clothes were worn, he was not slovenly. In hot weather, he often carried a dry‑and‑wet jacket, and he frequently held newspapers, mostly old papers, he had saved for himself. The edges of his shoes were usually stuffed with bits of paper used to make small hard‑paper cigarette boxes.
- In the 1950s, seeing Sap‑Saam‑Long living in hardship around Wan Chai, Sit Kok‑sin quietly offered financial assistance, though mostly indirectly. Sit once handed a HK$500 banknote to Cantonese opera star Yau Sing-po (尤聲普), asking him to buy new clothes for Sap‑Saam‑Long so he could appear more presentable. Yau Sing‑po first took Sap‑Saam‑Long to Yuk Tak Chee (浴德池) in Mong Kok for a proper wash, then bought him several second‑hand suits. Afterwards, Yau gave the remaining money to Sap‑Saam‑Long, who promptly exchanged it for $5 notes and distributed them to beggars on the street.
- In the 1950s, Sap‑Saam‑Long would wait until the traffic policemen had gone off duty at night, then stand beside the covered police post outside the Chinese Methodist Church Hong Kong (aka the "Red Brick Church") at the Tai Fat Hau crossroads in Wan Chai, delivering loud speeches to passers‑by. Wan Chai Police Station No. 2 once sent officers to arrest him. However, upon entering the station, Sap‑Saam‑Long conversed fluently in English with the expatriate police officers. After this incident, policemen who encountered similar situations no longer arrested him, preferring to avoid unnecessary trouble.

== Adaptations ==
The life story of Kong Yu-kau became widely known, and in 1993 it was adapted by Raymond To into the stage play Nam Hoi Sap‑saam Long, performed in Hong Kong with Tse Kwan‑ho in the role of Nam Hoi Sap‑saam Long. Because the stage play was enormously popular, it was later adapted into the 1997 Hong Kong film The Mad Phoenix, directed and produced by Clifton Ko, again starring Tse Kwan‑ho as Nam Hoi Sap‑saam Long. In 1999, Asia Television produced yet another adaptation, the television drama Nam Hoi Sap‑saam Long, with Gilbert Lam playing Nam Hoi Sap‑saam Long.

== Books ==
=== Biography ===
- Kong Yu-kau (2017) Miscellaneous Notes from the Little Orchid Study (小蘭齋雜記), Chu Siu‑cheung (ed.), Hong Kong, Commercial Press (Hong Kong).
- Jiang Peiyang (2016) The Decline of the Once‑Prestigious Taishi Di (滄桑太史第), Guangzhou, Flower City Publishing.
- Pearl Kong Chen (2004), The Story of Laan Zaai and Nanhai Shisan Lang (蘭齋舊事與南海十三郎), Hong Kong, Wan Li Book Co., Ltd.
  - Pearl Kong Chen (2010), A Family of Wealthy and Powerful Figures: The Story of Laan Zaai and Nanhai Shisan Lang (鐘鳴鼎食之家：蘭齋舊事與南海十三郎), Guangzhou: Guangdong Education Press.
  - Pearl Kong Chen (2014), The Story of Laan Zaai and Nanhai Shisan Lang (蘭齋舊事與南海十三郎), Commemorative and Revised Edition, Hong Kong, Wan Li Book Co., Ltd.
- Liu Wan (2001), The True Story of the Thirteen Heroes of Nam Hoi Sap Saam Long (南海十三郎之正傳), Hong Kong, Kehua Book Publishing Company.

=== Opera scripts ===
- Kong Yu-kau (2018) Fragrance Remains: Fragments of the Opera Nam Hoi Sap Saam Long (香如故：南海十三郎戲曲片羽), Chu Siu‑cheung (ed.), Hong Kong, Commercial Press (Hong Kong). ISBN 978-962-07-5760-0.
- Raymond To (1995), Nam Hoi Sap Saam Long in the Complete Stage Plays by To Kwok-wai (杜國威舞台劇本全集). Hong Kong: Subculture Hall.
