= Industrial and Commercial Daily Press =

Hong Kong book and newspaper publisher

Coordinates: 22.2789526°N 114.1704455°E

The Industrial and Commercial Daily Press Limited
- Status: Defunct
- Founded: 1928 (as limited company)
- Country of origin: Hong Kong
- Headquarters location: 18 Fenwick Street
- Distribution: Hong Kong
- Publication types: books and newspaper
- Imprints: The Kung Sheung Evening Press
- Owner: Ho Shai Lai family

The Industrial and Commercial Daily Press Limited
- Traditional Chinese: 工商日報有限公司
Transcriptions
Standard Mandarin
- Hanyu Pinyin: Gōng shāng rì bào yǒu xiàn gōng sī
Yue: Cantonese
- Jyutping: gung1 soeng1 jat6 bou3 jau5 haan6 gung1 si1

The Industrial and Commercial Daily Press
- Traditional Chinese: 工商日報社
Transcriptions
Standard Mandarin
- Hanyu Pinyin: Gōng shāng rì bào shè

Editorial Board of The Industrial and Commercial Daily Press
- Traditional Chinese: 工商日報編輯部
Transcriptions
Standard Mandarin
- Hanyu Pinyin: Gōng shāng rì bào biān jí bù

Sales Department of The Industrial and Commercial Daily Press
- Traditional Chinese: 工商日報營業部
Transcriptions
Standard Mandarin
- Hanyu Pinyin: Gōng shāng rì bào yíng yè bù

Industrial and Commercial Daily Press Book Series
- Traditional Chinese: 工商日報叢書
Transcriptions
Standard Mandarin
- Hanyu Pinyin: Gōng shāng rì bào cóng shū

The Industrial and Commercial Daily Press Limited was the editor and publisher of the three newspapers in British Hong Kong, The Kung Sheung Daily News (Chinese: 工商日報; lit. 'Industrial and Commercial Daily News'), The Kung Sheung Evening News (Chinese: 工商晚報; lit. 'Industrial and Commercial Evening News') and The Tien Kwong Morning News (Chinese: 天光報; lit. 'Dawn News'). The company also wrote and published some special report, fiction and non-fiction.

The limited company was incorporated in 1928 and was winding up in 1996. The predecessor of the company was founded circa the same year with the daily newspaper in 1925.

The company was located in Gage Street, and then on 43 Des Voeux Road Central, and then on 18 Fenwick Street, Wan Chai, all on Hong Kong Island.

== Shareholders ==
According to the filings in the Hong Kong Companies Registry, the first available Annual Return (after World War II) in 1946, shown Sir Robert Hotung and his son Ho Shai Lai owned 500 out of 1,850 shares, Kwan Cho-yiu 140 shares, journalist Wu Dit Ng (Chinese: 胡秩五; Jyutping: wu4 dit6 ng5) 50 shares, as well as other shareholders; the nominal largest shareholder was a corporate body "Sang Kee" (Chinese: 生記; Jyutping: saang1 gei3) for 1,000 shares. "Sang Kee", according to a biography of Ho Shai Lai, was one of the business of Ho Shai Lai.

The last Annual Return of the company in 1994, shown Ho Shai Lai and his wife, late Hesta Hung (d.1991) owned most of the shares, with his nephew Eric Hotung and a Liberia-incorporated as minority shareholders.

== Books ==
- Editorial Board of The Industrial and Commercial Daily Press, ed. (5 October 1934) [First published on The Kung Sheung Daily News in 1934]. Xiang gang Hua zi gong chang diao cha lu 香港華資工廠調查錄 [The investigation report of Hong Kong [ethnic] Chinese-owned factories]. Book 1 of Industrial and Commercial Daily Press Book Series (in Traditional Chinese). Hong Kong: Industrial and Commercial Daily Press. OCLC 815381589.
- Hou, Yao (August 1935) [First published on The Kung Sheung Evening News circa 1935]. Editorial Board of The Industrial and Commercial Daily Press (ed.). Tai ping yang shang de feng yun 太平洋上的風雲 [Storm Over the Pacific]. Book 2 of Industrial and Commercial Daily Press Book Series (in Traditional Chinese). Hong Kong: Industrial and Commercial Daily Press. OCLC 28863529.
- 豹翁 [Pao Weng] (March 1936) [First published on The Kung Sheung Daily News circa 1932]. Editorial Board of The Industrial and Commercial Daily Press (ed.). Huang ho lou kan chiu chi 黃鶴樓感舊記 [Yellow Crane Tower Old Memories]. Book 3 of Industrial and Commercial Daily Press Book Series (in Traditional Chinese). Hong Kong: Industrial and Commercial Daily Press. OCLC 28825885.
- 豹翁 [Pao Weng] (1936). Wu hu lian ai 嗚呼戀愛 [Alas, in love]. Book 4 of Industrial and Commercial Daily Press Book Series (in Traditional Chinese). Hong Kong: Industrial and Commercial Daily Press. OCLC 51266858.
- 豹翁 [Pao Weng] (July 1936) [First published on The Kung Sheung Daily News circa 1932]. Editorial Board of The Industrial and Commercial Daily Press (ed.). Wu nian qian zhi kong xiang nu shi an 五年前之空箱女屍案 [The case of female corpse in an empty box 5 years ago]. Book 5 of Industrial and Commercial Daily Press Book Series (in Traditional Chinese). Hong Kong: Industrial and Commercial Daily Press. OCLC 18646172.
- 平可 (1941) [First published on The Kung Sheung Daily News 1939–40]. Shan chang shui yuan 山長水遠 [Long road to mountain and far away from water] (in Chinese (Hong Kong)). Hong Kong: Industrial and Commercial Daily Press. OCLC 51240788.
