= Hong Kong Drama Award for Best Script =

Annual theatrical award

The Hong Kong Drama Award for Best Script is presented by the Hong Kong Federation of Drama Societies at the Hong Kong Drama Awards ceremony, recognizing the most outstanding stage play script and playwright of the year.

== Past winners ==
Year	Name	Title	Theatre company/production	Ref.
1992 (1st)	Cheung Tat-ming	Far Way Home 客鄉途情遠	Chung Ying Theatre Company	
1992 (1st)	Anthony Chan Kam-kuen	大屋 lit. 'Big House '	Sha Tin Theatre	
1992 (1st)	Raymond To	Tokyo blues 扶桑過客 (Note: lit. 'The Fusang Passenger ')	Hong Kong Repertory Theatre	
1993 (2nd)	Raymond To	A Foxy Tale 聊齋新誌	Wan Chai Theatre	
1993 (2nd)	Raymond To	I Have a Date with Spring 我和春天有個約會	Hong Kong Repertory Theatre	
1993 (2nd)	Chow Yuk-ming	徘徊在纏綿時份 lit. 'Lingering in a tender moment '	Actors' Family	
1994 (3rd)	Raymond To	The Mad Phoenix 南海十三郎	Hong Kong Repertory Theatre	
1994 (3rd)	Mok Hei	我要結婚 lit. 'I want to get married '	Hong Kong Federation of Drama Societies	
1994 (3rd)	Anthony Chan Kam-kuen	The Legend Of A Storyteller 說書人柳敬亭	Chung Ying Theatre Company	
1995 (4th)	Anthony Chan Kam-kuen	Johnny Got His Guns 情危生命線	旭日坊劇團 lit. 'Rising Sun Theatre Company'	
1995 (4th)	Chan Chu-hei, Jim Chim and Olivia Yan	The Unbearable Twain 再見紅日出 (Note: lit. 'See the red sun rise again')	Theatre Ensemble	
1995 (4th)	Ko Tin-lung	The School & I 芳草校園	Chung Ying Theatre Company	
1995 (4th)	Chow Yuk-ming	Sleeping Wife 酣睡廚房瓷磚上	Horizonte	
1996 (5th)	Cheung Tat-ming	The End of the Long River 長河之末	Hong Kong Academy for Performing Arts	
1996 (5th)	Poon Wai-sum	The Mosquito Hero 武松打蚊 (Note: lit. 'Wu Song Fights the Mosquito ')	Prospects Theatre	
1996 (5th)	Raymond To	Forever Yours 人生唯願多知己	Chung Ying Theatre Company	
1997 (6th)	Ng Ka-hai	Dragon's legend 龍情化不開 (Note: lit. 'Deep Love For Home Cannot Dissolve ')	Exploration Theatre	
1997 (6th)	Ken Kwan	Oh, Touchwood! 冬瓜豆腐	The Nonsensemakers	
1997 (6th)	Raymond To	Love à la Zen 愛情觀自在	Hong Kong Repertory Theatre	
1997 (6th)	Poon Wai-sum	The Oak Tree 闖進一棵橡樹的年輪	Theatre du Pif	
1998 (7th)	Poon Wai-sum	The Cockroach that Flies like a Helicopter 雞春咁大隻曱甴兩頭岳	Prospects Theatre	
1998 (7th)	Anthony Chan Kam-kuen	The Call of the White Orchid 白蘭呼喚	Hong Kong Academy for Performing Arts	
1998 (7th)	Leung Ka-kit	The Professional 專業社團	Chung Ying Theatre Company	
1998 (7th)	Cheung Tat-ming	Before the Rain Stops 瘋雨狂居 (Note: lit. 'Mad Rain, Wild Home ')	Hong Kong Repertory Theatre	
1999 (8th)	He Jiping	De Ling & Empress Dowager Ci Xi 德齡與慈禧	Hong Kong Repertory Theatre	
1999 (8th)	Raymond To	Butterfly Lovers 梁祝	The Spring-Time Group	
1999 (8th)	Chan Chi-wah	Up he climbs, Down she crawls 狷窿狷罅擒高擒低	Actors' Family	
1999 (8th)	Poon Wai-sum	The Rising Ants 螞蟻上樹	Prospects Theatre	
2000 (9th)	Poon Wai-sum	Cricket in My Life 三姊妹與哥哥和一隻蟋蟀	Prospects Theatre	
2000 (9th)	Ko Tin-lung	The Merchant Of China 紅頂商人胡雪巖	Chung Ying Theatre Company	
2000 (9th)	Raymond To	Forever and Ever 地久天長	Hong Kong Repertory Theatre	
2001 (10th)	Poon Wai-sum	Hu Xueyan, My Dear 親愛的‧胡雪巖	TNT Theatre	
2001 (10th)	Poon Wai-sum	To Kill or To Be Killed 螳螂捕蟬	Prospects Theatre	
2001 (10th)	Anthony Chan Kam-kuen	The New Thunderstorm 周門家事	Hong Kong Federation of Drama Societies	
2002 (11th)	Poon Wai-sum	Spiders in Meditation 在天台上冥想的蜘蛛	Prospects Theatre	
2002 (11th)	Poon Wai-sum	Ng Wong the Swordsman 大刀王五	Theatre Space	
2002 (11th)	Chan Chi-wah	Under Construction 蛋散與豬扒 (Note: lit. 'Egg Twists and Pork Chops ')	Actors' Family	
2003 (12th)	Candace Chong	Alive in the Mortuary 留守太平間	Chung Ying Theatre Company	
2003 (12th)	He Jiping	Secret of Resurrection 還魂香	Hong Kong Repertory Theatre	
2003 (12th)	Poon Wai-sum	Of Fire And Fireworks 香港煙花燦爛 also known as 港燦 (Note: lit. 'Hong Kong's Dazzling Fireworks a.k.a. Gongcaan ')	Theatre Ensemble and Prospects Theatre	
2004 (13th)	Poon Wai-sum	Dragon Head 龍頭	Prospects Theatre	
2004 (13th)	Fire Lee Ka-wing	Oldsters on Fire 老馬有火	Wan Chai Theatre	
2004 (13th)	Yu Hon-ting	The Country Teacher 山村老師	Drama Gallery	
2005 (14th)	Candace Chong	Shall We Go to Mars? 找個人和我上火星	Hong Kong Repertory Theatre	
2005 (14th)	Cheung Tat-ming	Rotate 270° 旋轉270°	Hong Kong Repertory Theatre	
2005 (14th)	Poon Wai-sum	Of Minds and No-mind 虎鶴雙形 (Note: lit. 'Tiger Crane Paired Form ')	Theatre Ensemble and Prospects Theatre	
2006 (15th)	Candace Chong	The French Kiss 法吻	SNAP Production	
2006 (15th)	Lucy Ching Man-fai and Ko Tin-lung	One of the Lucky Ones (Step II) 伴我同行 (第二部)	Chung Ying Theatre Company	
2006 (15th)	Matthew Cheng Kwok-wai	February 14; 2月14	Hong Kong Repertory Theatre	
2007 (16th)	Szeto Wai-kin	The Last Bet of My Dead Aunt 頭注香	Chung Ying Theatre Company	
2007 (16th)	Wong Wing-sze	The Last Piece of Gold of Miss Pang 一粒金	Prospects Theatre	
2007 (16th)	Poon Wai-sum	The Massage King 大汗推拿	Prospects Theatre	
2008 (17th)	Elton Lau	Waiting for the Match 獨坐婚姻介紹所	Cinematic Theatre	
2008 (17th)	Alvin Wong	Once in a Lifetime 一期一會	W Theatre	
2008 (17th)	Poon Wai-sum	Dust and Dawn 我自在江湖	Hong Kong Repertory Theatre	
2008 (17th)	Wong Wing-sze	this happy VALLEY is VERY happy 娛樂大坑之大娛樂坑	Hong Kong Repertory Theatre	
2009 (18th)	Raymond To	I Love A-Ai (Note: The play was named Love You Forever) 我愛阿愛	Hong Kong Repertory Theatre	
2009 (18th)	Leung Shing-him	In the Wonderland 幸福太太	Class 7A Drama Group Limited	
2009 (18th)	Lee Wai-cheung	To Dream the Impossible Dream 秒速18米	Wan Chai Theatre	
2009 (18th)	Yu Hon-ting	Hello in There 這裡加一點顏色	Hong Kong Repertory Theatre and Drama Gallery	
2010 (19th)	Candace Chong	Murder in San José 聖荷西謀殺案	Hong Kong Arts Festival	
2010 (19th)	Sylvia Chang	Design for Living 華麗上班族之生活與生存	Edward Lam Dance Theatre	
2010 (19th)	Elton Lau	Soulmate 相聚21克	iStage and Chasing Culture	
2011 (20th)	Wong Wing-sze	The Truth About Lying 香港式離婚	Hong Kong Arts Festival	
2011 (20th)	Daisy Wong and Poon Wai-sum	Peacock Man & Durian Woman 孔雀男與榴槤女	Windmill Grass Theatre	
2011 (20th)	Anthony Chan Kam-kuen	Dr. Faustus 魔鬼契約	Hong Kong Repertory Theatre	
2011 (20th)	Cheung Fei-fan and Owen Kwok	The Best Wretches 天上人渣	loft Stage and Chasing Culture	
2012 (21st)	Matthew Cheng Kwok-wai	The Last Supper 最後晚餐	Hong Kong Repertory Theatre	
2012 (21st)	Kenson Chan Wing-chuen	The Heydays 盛勢	Hong Kong Repertory Theatre	
2012 (21st)	Elton Lau	Beyond the Words; 20,000赫茲的說話	iStage	
2013 (22nd)	Yu Hon-ting	Nitehawk 夜鷹姊魅	Drama Gallery	
2013 (22nd)	Yuen Lup-fun, Luk Wai-hung, Rupert Chan, Tang Shu-wing, Lo Wai-luk and Ken Kwan	Another Last Lesson 完不了的最後一課	Chung Ying Theatre Company	
2013 (22nd)	Yau Ting-fai	The Cell 臭格	Hong Kong Repertory Theatre	
2014 (23rd)	Candace Chong	The Professor 教授	Hong Kong Repertory Theatre	
2014 (23rd)	Poon Wai-sum	The Emperor, his Mom, a Eunuch and a Man 都是龍袍惹的禍	Hong Kong Repertory Theatre	
2014 (23rd)	Loong Man-hong	The Big Big Day 大龍鳯	Chung Ying Theatre Company	
2015 (24th)	Cheung Fei-fan	Checkmate 23 棋廿三	Theatre Space	
2015 (24th)	Alvin Wong	Shuraba 修羅場	W Theatre	
2015 (24th)	Loong Man-hong	Go Go Ghost 過戶陰陽眼	Chung Ying Theatre Company	
2016 (25th)	Loong Man-hong	The Abandoned Harbour 維港乾了	Hong Kong Repertory Theatre	
2016 (25th)	Judy Chu	Farewell the Good Old Days 失禮‧死人	Hong Kong Repertory Theatre	
2016 (25th)	Matthew Cheng Kwok-wai	The Sin Family 最後作孽	Hong Kong Repertory Theatre	
2016 (25th)	Elton Lau	Off Key Buddies 走音大聯萌	iStage	
2017 (26th)	Chan Ping-chiu	Waking Dreams in 1984 午睡	On & On Theatre Workshop	
2017 (26th)	Birdy Wong Ching-yan	The Truth from Liar 竹林深處強姦	Artocrite Theatre	
2017 (26th)	Tang Sai-cheong	Three Brothers 三子	Hong Kong Repertory Theatre	
2018 (27th)	Poon Wai-sum	The Diary of Song 武松日記	Hong Kong Repertory Theatre	
2018 (27th)	Cheung Tat-ming	Forever Silence 塵上不囂	Hong Kong Repertory Theatre	
2018 (27th)	Loong Man-hong	Hong Kong Astronaut 香港家族三部曲－香港太空人	Hong Kong Arts Festival	
2019 (28th)	Wong Kwok-kui	No News is True News 新聞小花的告白	Windmill Grass Theatre	
2019 (28th)	Kwok Wing-hong	Principle (2018) 原則	Hong Kong Repertory Theatre	
2019 (28th)	Matthew Cheng Kwok-wai	Auspicious Day 好日子	Hong Kong Repertory Theatre	
2020 (29th)	Candace Chong	May 35th 5月35日	Stage 64	
2020 (29th)	Candace Chong	My Very Short Marriage 短暫的婚姻	Dharma Workshop	
2020 (29th)	Joey Leung and Melody Yuen	The Best Day In My Life 米線女戰士	Windmill Grass Theatre	
2022 (30th)	Matthew Cheng Kwok-wai	Ambiguous 曖昧	Hong Kong Repertory Theatre	
2022 (30th)	Chan Siu-tung	Try to be Funny 雄顏一笑	BHT Theatre	
2022 (30th)	Cheung Fei-fan	A Tale of the Southern Sky 一水南天	Hong Kong Dance Company and Actors' Family	
2023 (31st)	Candace Chong	One Last Gift 最後禮物	Emperor Entertainment Group	
2023 (31st)	Candace Chong	We are gay 我們最快樂	Hong Kong Arts Festival	
2023 (31st)	Cheung Fei-fan	The Impossible Trial 大狀王	Hong Kong Repertory Theatre and West Kowloon Cultural District	
2023 (31st)	Poon Wai-sum	Confrontations 兩刃相交	Hong Kong Repertory Theatre	
2024 (32nd)	Leung Shing-him	The Sympathetic Detonation 殉爆	Class 7A Drama Group Limited	
2024 (32nd)	Lee Wai-lok	Leave Him in The Dust 塵落無聲	Theatre Formula	
2024 (32nd)	Birdy Wong Ching-yan	I am Tree 植物人	Artocrite Theatre	
2025 (33rd)	Jim Hui	The Bucket 半桶水	Hong Kong Repertory Theatre	
2025 (33rd)	Jim Hui	Vacant Possession 凶的空間	Hong Kong Repertory Theatre	
2025 (33rd)	Joey Leung	Ana 亞娜	Windmill Grass Theatre	
2026 (34th)	Jun Li	In a Perfect World 完美的世界	On & On Theatre Workshop	
2026 (34th)	Lee Wai-lok	In Hollywood We Trust 荷里活有單大生意	Dramoxic	
2026 (34th)	Cheung Fei-fan	What the Buddha Said 我佛無著經	Hong Kong Academy for Performing Arts	
2026 (34th)	Lai Yiu-ming	In Between 人間	Hong Kong Repertory Theatre	
