= Yuki Ip =

Yuki Ip 葉葆菁 (Ip Po-Ching)
- Origin: Hong Kong
- Genres: Opera
- Occupation: Soprano

Yuki Ip (Ip Po-Ching, Chinese: 葉葆菁) is a Hong Kong soprano. In 2014 she was an artist in residence at Radio 4, the classical music station of RTHK.

== Education ==
Ip has a BMus degree from the Hong Kong Academy for Performing Arts and an MMus from the New England Conservatory in Boston, in the United States.

== Career ==
Ip sang the rôle of the first wife in the world première of Huang Ruo's opera Dr. Sun Yat-sen in 2011 with "warmth and dignity". She has performed in mainland China, as a guest soloist with the orchestra of the Shanghai Opera House at the Shanghai World Exposition, and at the National Centre for the Performing Arts in Beijing with José Carreras. She has performed at Le French May festival in Hong Kong and at the Macau International Arts Festival. She has frequently sung for broadcasts of Radio Television Hong Kong, and was an artist in residence at its Radio 4 channel in 2014.
