= Paul Poon =

Paul Poon may refer to:

- Paul Poon (racing driver), Hong Kong racing driver
- Paul Poon Wai-sum, Hong Kong playwright
