= I Have a Date with Spring =

1994 Hong Kong film by Clifton Ko

- Film poster
- Directed by: Clifton Ko
- Written by: Raymond To
- Produced by: Clifton Ko; Raymond To; Ko Tin Lung
- Starring: Alice Lau Nga Lai; Koon-Lan Law; Anita Lee; Louisa So
- Edited by: Chow Cheung-kan
- Music by: Lee Hoi-Kam; Wan Ho-Kit
- Production company: Ko Chi Sum Films
- Distributed by: Universe Video
- Release date: 20 April 1994 (Hong Kong)
- Running time: 86 minutes
- Country: Hong Kong
- Languages: Mainly in Cantonese, some songs were also sung in Mandarin and English

I Have a Date with Spring (Chinese: 我和春天有個約會) is a 1994 Hong Kong film directed by Clifton Ko and written by Raymond To. It is originally a 1992 play of the same name by Ko Tin Lung.

== Synopsis ==
The movie takes place in modern times when female lead, Butterfly (姚小蝶) visits Hong Kong from retirement in Canada to perform in a final charity show at the Flower Palace Nightclub before it is demolished. As she walks into the club, flashback of one fateful night in 1967 at the Flower Palace Nightclub replays. We're taken back to 1960s of a girl group called "The 4 Nuts". On the night of the Hong Kong 1967 Leftist Riots, Butterfly was given an accidental chance to perform the final show when the original and star performer, Pak Long, was stranded at another venue. This started a chain of events that will change the four character's lives forever.

=== Ending Of Four Main Characters ===
Of the four main characters, only Butterfly continued stardom, and had a long career as a singer and actress. She had financial security, but lost out on romance, as her love interest, Karl Sum, cannot bear the pressure and relative shame of living with someone who is much more popular. Karl left for New York City to start a new career, only to be reunited with Butterfly at the end of the movie. This ending differs from the adapted ATV series, as although Butterfly and Karl meet again, she cannot forgive him for leaving her.

Lulu Kim also became a local celebrity, but not on the same level as Butterfly. Lulu eventually was married to Luk Tat Sun, the son of one of the directors of the Flower Palace Nightclub. He originally sought to marry Butterfly, but she waited out for Karl, and refused his advances.

Fung Ping continues her unlucky streak in romance. She followed Donny, her gambling-addict boyfriend, to Vietnam with a show tour team. She arrived in Vietnam at the height of the Vietnam War, and was presumably killed during a bombing raid by US Forces. She gave birth to a son while in Vietnam, despite earlier promises of an abortion, and Karl Sum adopted the son and took him to the US. He was united with Butterfly at the end of the movie.

Nancy eventually sought another job at another nightclub as a lounge singer. She remained obscure, and became depressed and an alcoholic. She eventually lost her voice due to alcohol and died of cirrhosis. Butterfly only knew of this right before her charity show.

== Characters ==
- Butterfly Yiu (姚小蝶)- One of the "Four Crazy Kings" (四大顛皇) at the Flower Palace Nightclub (麗花皇宮夜總會). She was initially among the lesser known singers of the nightclub, but through a series of events, she started her road to stardom.
- Lulu Kim (金露露)- The second one of the "Four Crazy Kings" at the nightclub. She is the most unassuming of the four "kings", and eventually had a movie career and married the son of one of the Flower Palace Nightclub's directors.
- Nancy Hong (紅蓮茜)- The most flamboyant of the Four Crazy Kings. Nancy is known for her fiery tempers, which gets her into very heated (almost physical) arguments with her rivals.
- Fung Ping Lam (藍鳳萍)- The tragic one in the "Four Crazy Kings". She is unlucky in love, and falls in love with a gamble-addict brass band member.
- Pak Long (白浪)- The most famous singer at the nightclub at the time. He is known for a rather diva-ish demeanors. It is hinted that Pak Long is homosexual, but that is not revealed in the movie. Pak Long eventually declined in popularity.
- Yuen Pik (婉碧)- She is the diva of the nightclub, and was the most popular female singer at the time. She is also known for her fake bottom and breast implants, which was a part of a running gag. She was eventually outshone by Butterfly.
- Karl Sum (沈家豪)- The main band member in the Flower Palace brass band. He is the love interest of Butterfly. Their relationship is rocky, and Karl eventually cannot bear the pains of living under the much more popular Butterfly.

== Cast ==
This is a partial list of cast for the 1994 film.

- Alice Lau Ar-Lai as Butterfly Yiu
- May Law Koon-Lan as Lulu Kim
- Rocelia Fung Wai-Hang as Nancy
- Louisa So as Fung Ping
- David Wu as Karl Sum
- Tse Kwan-Ho as Danny
- Yip Wing-Cho as Po
- Anita Lee as Bar Girl
- Raymond Wong as Maitre d'
- James Wong as Triad
- Teresa Mo as Woman at Concert Hall
- Fung Bo-Bo as Concert Mistress of Ceremonies

Below is a partial list of cast for the 1995 ATV TV series.

- Sheren Tang as Butterfly Yiu
- Joey Meng as Fung Ping Lam
- Kiki Sheung as Nancy
- Kwong Wa as Karl Sum

== Awards ==
14th Annual Hong Kong Film Awards

- Law Koon-Lan - Winner of Best Supporting Actress
- Alice Lau Ar-Lai - Nominated and Winner of Best New Artist
- Raymond To Kwok-Wai - Winner of Best Screenplay
- Fung Wai-Hung - Nominated for Best Supporting Actress
- Hui Fan - Nominated for Best New Artist
- Lee Hong-Gum, Wan Hol-Geen - Nominated for Best Original Score
- Film was Nomination for Best Picture

== Related products ==
=== Theme song ===
The main theme song is 'I Have a Date with Spring' sung by Alice Lau. The drama was performed first by Hong Kong Repertory Theatre (香港話劇團) in 1992. The drama was later performed by the theatre (春天話劇團) of Spring-Time Stage Productions (春天舞台劇製作有限公司).

=== Television series ===
In 1995, "I Have a Date With Spring" was adapted into a television series by ATV, starring Sheren Tang as Butterfly Yiu and lasting a total of 40 episodes. Similar to the film, the series takes place in flashbacks by Butterfly as she walks through a newly restored Flower Palace Nightclub. The series explores not only the lives of Butterfly, Lulu, Nancy, and Fung Ping while working at the nightclub, but also their lives before they began working at Flower Palace (such as Nancy being raised in an orphanage), as well as ongoing issues with their families (such as Fung Ping's less fortunate background, and Butterfly's father's dying career as a Cantonese Opera singer). It also expands more on the different characters working at Flower Palace, such as Yuen Bik.

=== Musical ===
In 2001–2005, the film was rewritten as a musical, the Flower Palace (麗花皇宮), many elder famous singers played in it, sang some of their best songs. VCD and DVD of the karaoke versions of the plays are released in 2001–2003. Alice Lau and Louisa So performed in many of different performances related to the play.

There is a book of the play by Raymond To (我和春天有個約會 ISBN 962-7420-61-1).
