= Candace Chong =

Hong Kong woman playwright (born 1976)

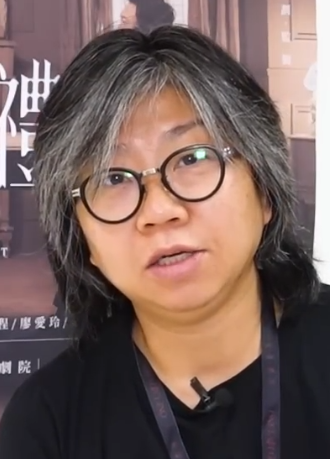
- Chong in July 2022
- Born: September 9, 1976 (age 49); Fujian, China

Chinese name
- Traditional Chinese: 莊梅岩
- Simplified Chinese: 庄梅岩
Transcriptions
Standard Mandarin
- Hanyu Pinyin: Zhuāng Méiyán
Yue: Cantonese
- Jyutping: zong1 mui4 ngaam4

Signature
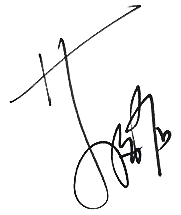

Candace Chong Mui-ngam (Chinese: 莊梅岩; Jyutping: zong1 mui4 ngaam4) is a Hong Kong playwright whose plays include French Kiss (2005), Murder in San José (2009) and The Wild Boar (2012). She has won the Hong Kong Drama Award for Best Script seven times.

== Early life and education ==
Chong was born in Fujian, China in 1976. The characters “Mui-ngam" (梅岩) in her name were derived from her parents' ancestral origins. She spent her early childhood in Fujian, where her father was a director of Fujian's traditional Liyuan opera and her mother worked as a primary school teacher. Both parents were part of the Wengongtuan (文工團), organized by the People's Liberation Army. Chong also has a younger brother who is three years her junior. At the age of three, she moved to Hong Kong with her family.

After settling in Hong Kong, her father worked as a security guard and her mother became a factory worker. The family lived on Whitty Street in Shek Tong Tsui. She attended the afternoon session of Kau Yan School, graduating from Primary Six in 1989, before enrolling at St. Paul's Co-educational College. There, she studied in the arts stream and performed particularly well in Chinese. She also developed an early interest in theatre, directing and writing short plays for school projects. Upon graduating from secondary school in 1995, Chong enrolled at the Chinese University of Hong Kong, where she studied psychology in the Faculty of Social Science and was a member of Shaw College. She completed her degree in 1999, then pursued playwriting at the Hong Kong Academy for Performing Arts before moving to London to earn a master's degree at Royal Holloway, University of London.

== Career ==
After completing her formal education, Chong joined the Chung Ying Theatre Company where she wrote her plays Alive in the Mortuary (2003), Shall We Go to Mars? (2005), French Kiss (2005), Murder in San José (2009) and The Wild Boar (2012). In 2011 she worked with American composer Huang Ruo to write a libretto for the opera Dr. Sun Yat-sen. The completed work premiered at the National Centre for the Performing Arts in Beijing and later was adapted worldwide.

== Works ==
=== Plays ===
- Love in the Red Chamber (愛在紅樓; April 2001)
- Portland Street's Venezia Cafe (砵蘭街的Venezia Cafe; April 2002)
- Alive in the Mortuary (留守太平間; July 2002)
- 易角 (September 2002)
- Angel Aurora (破冰天使; August 2003)
- 再度飛躍紅船 (November 2003)
- 情思 (November 2003) - cowritten with yatyau
- Shall We Go to Mars? (找個人和我上火星; March 2004)
- French Kiss (法吻; February 2005)
- Take This Waltz (不如跳跳舞; May 2006)
- Murder in San José (聖荷西謀殺案; March 2009)
- Fat Pig (胖侣; August 2010) - adapted
- Wild Boar (野豬; February 2012)
- How to be a star (星夢塵緣; March 2012)
- The Professor (教授; October 2013)
- Tonnochy (杜老誌; July 2014)
- Black Monday (黑色星期一; November 2014)
- Sing Out (奮青樂與路; September 2017) - musical
- My Very Short Marriage (短暫的婚姻; January 2019)
- Death on a Road Trip (公路死亡事件; March 2019)
- May 35th (5月35日; May 2019)
- Madam Sew (車輪婆婆; December 2021)
- One Last Gift (最後禮物; July 2022)
- We are gay (我們最快樂; November 2022)
- Show Me Your Love! (愛我別走; February 2023)

=== Opera ===
- Dr. Sun Yat-sen (中山逸仙; 2011)

=== Television series ===
- Rainbow Interchange EP 1 Tenant's Closet (彩虹交匯處 第一集 租客的衣櫃; 7 August 2017) - LGBT miniseries
- My Very Short Marriage (短暫的婚姻; October 2017)

=== Film adaptations ===
- Heaven in the Dark (2016), adapted from French Kiss
