= Fenwick Pier =

Former pier in Wan Chai, Hong Kong

Coordinates: 22.281143°N 114.168840°E

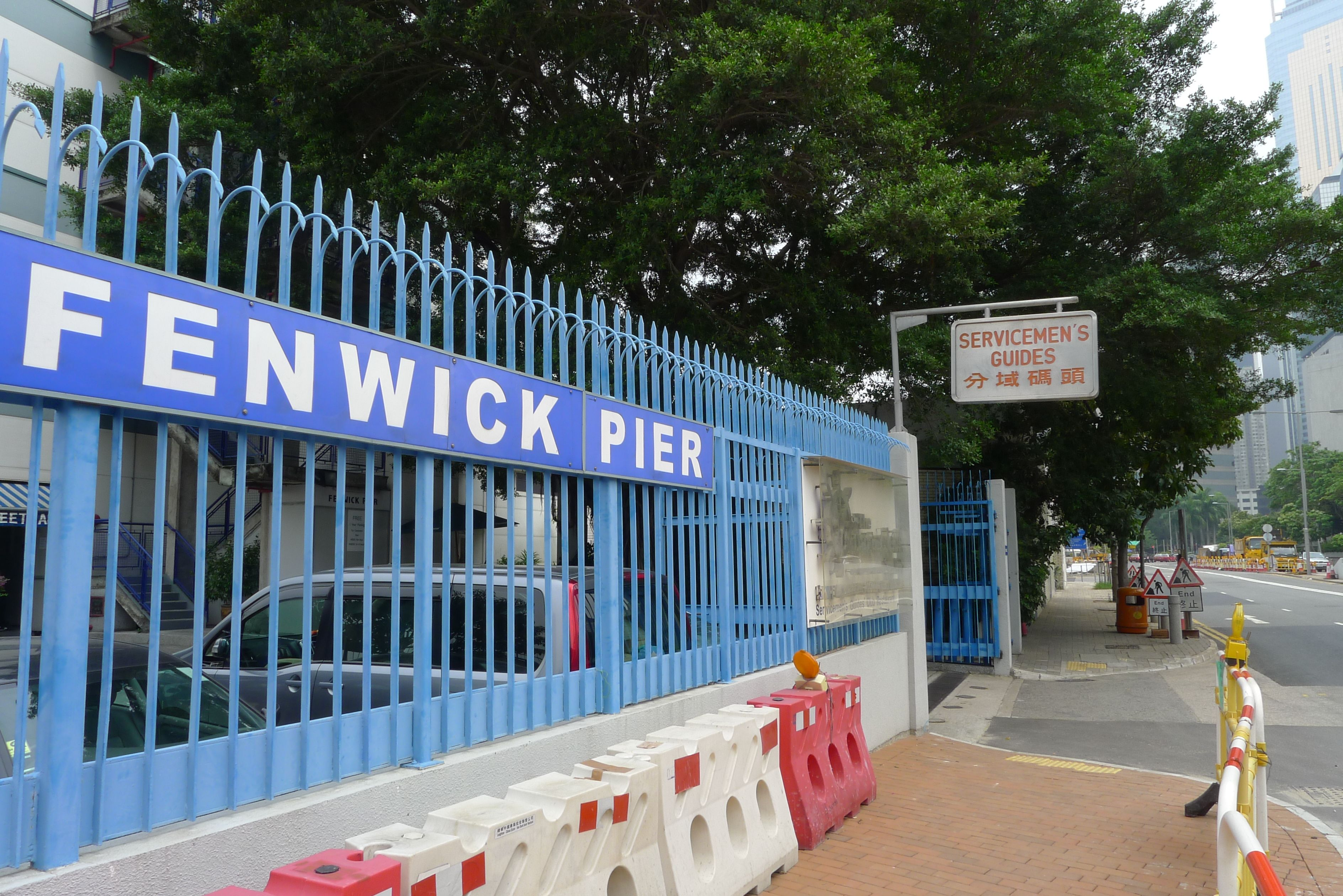
Access to Fenwick Pier along Fenwick Pier Street in 2011.

Fenwick Pier (Chinese: 分域碼頭) was located at 1 Lung King Street (龍景街), Wan Chai Northwest, Hong Kong Island.

Managed by Servicemen's Guides Association (the SGA), a non-profit organization, Fenwick Pier had been in operation in Wan Chai since 1953 serving military sailors. Fenwick Pier had been seen as the lighthouse of hospitality, answering questions about Hong Kong and providing hospitality services for sea-based visitors to Hong Kong.

== Club membership ==
Bound by the Club Ordinance, the SGA has been operating as a private club and is a membership based non-profit organization. Members of the public could enjoy services at Fenwick Pier after applying for membership of the SGA, which is simple, easy, and free of charge – only name, email and signature are required.

== History ==
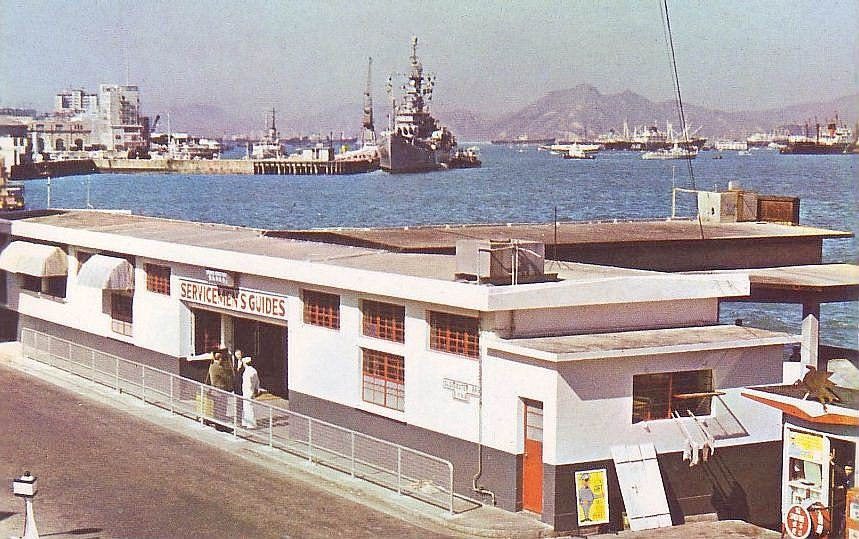
SGA building along Gloucester Road in 1962.

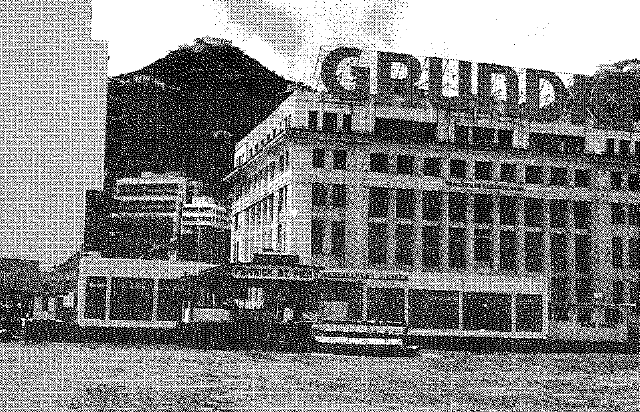
Rebuilt pier in 1965.

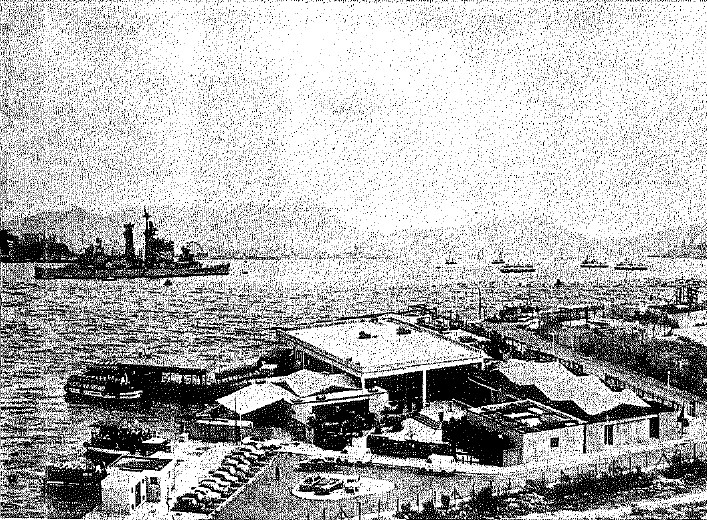
Fenwick Pier Extension in 1974.

- 1887: George Fenwick established Fenwick & Co., a shipyard in 1887.
- 1953: The SGA began operation with a desk on the sidewalk next to Fenwick Street, until the Government donated the land on which a 28 foot by 20 foot building was started.
- 1964: The Pier had to be rebuilt after typhoons Wanda and Ruby dealt severe blows to the building.
- 1965: The rebuilt Pier opened in June.
- 1967: The Government decided to reclaim the seafront for the construction of a new express highway and requested the SGA to move out. After negotiation, the Government granted about 30,000 square feet on the newly reclaimed land to the SGA.
- 1970: The present Fenwick Pier building was completed.
- 1974: The extension of Fenwick Pier opened.
- 1994: The Fleet Arcade, a 4-storey shopping centre was launched.
- 1997: The Government revised the tenancy agreement of the land at Fenwick Pier from 5-year short-term tenancy to a quarterly short-term tenancy.
- 2016: Town Planning Board approved the SGA's redevelopment plan of Fenwick Pier.
- 2021: The Government notified the SGA in January 2020 that the lease for Fenwick Pier is to end, and that the SGA is to evacuate the site by the end of 2021.
- 2022: Fenwick Pier was closed for good in 11 February 2022 and a new fire station is to be built in where it stood.

Fenwick Pier has sustained two periods of devastation by typhoons. On 1 September 1962, Wanda made a direct hit on Fenwick Pier causing extensive damage to the main building. Another typhoon, Ruby, struck on 5 September 1964. On both occasions, the SGA moved their operation to the basement of the Sailor's Home and Mission to Seamen. The damaged Pier was then rebuilt and while rebuilding, the SGA continued to operate in the U.S. Servicemen's lounge across the road from the Pier for nine months. The rebuilt Pier opened on 5 June 1965.

At the end 1967, the Government decided to reclaim the seafront for the construction of a new express highway and requested the SGA to relocate. After negotiation, the Government granted about 30,000 square feet on the newly reclaimed land to the SGA. The first and second phase of the new Fenwick Pier building opened in 1970. It included a restaurant, a money exchange, a film processing concession, a gift shop; lounges with typewriters, telephones and billiard tables; chaplains' offices, storerooms and the information booth. The Fenwick Pier extension was completed in 1974 with enlarged area for servicemen to relax.

In 1994, the redeveloped 4-storey Fleet Arcade opened to provide more shopping facilities and services.

In April 1997, the Government revised the tenancy agreement at Fenwick Pier from a 5-year short-term tenancy to a quarterly short-term tenancy.

== Land resumption ==
Fenwick Pier became landlocked in 2016 due to reclamation.

The Government of Hong Kong notified the SGA in January 2020 that the lease for Fenwick Pier was to end, and that the SGA would have to vacate the site by the end of 2021.

The Government of Hong Kong plans to relocate the Kong Wan Fire Station in Wan Chai to the Fenwick Pier site, while the current site of the fire station will be used to extend the Hong Kong Convention and Exhibition Center.

== Services ==
For visiting international military sailors, they could enjoy free local sim cards, transportation shuttles, information booth to answer questions in the sailor’s native language, free guide books, etc. At Fenwick Pier, the SGA has served sailors from 14 countries in the past decade, with two to 28 vessels and 1,280 to 35,400 sailors arriving each year.

== Fleet Arcade ==
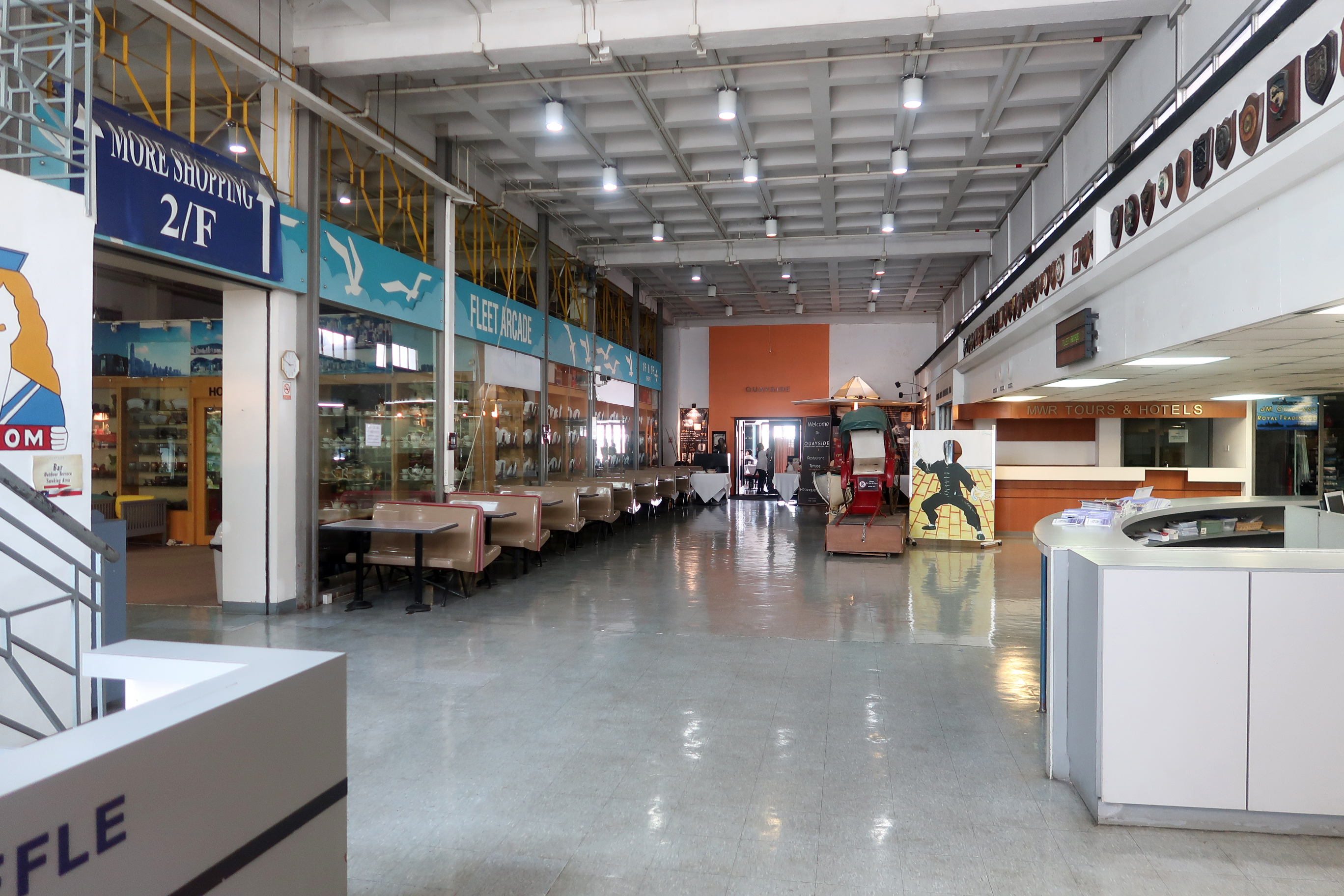
Fleet Arcade in 2019.

The 4-storey Fleet Arcade (海軍商場) opened in 1994. It provided visiting sailors and marines with a place to rest and enjoy shopping and recreational facilities, as well as a chance to explore the excitement of Hong Kong. Sailors and members could enjoy a wide range of services at the Fleet Arcade, such as eatery, supermarket, barber shop, tailor shop and souvenir shops.
