= The Mad Phoenix =

1997 Hong Kong film by Clifton Ko

- Film poster
- Directed by: Clifton Ko Chi Sum
- Written by: Raymond To Kwok-Wai
- Produced by: Clifton Ko Chi Sum
- Starring: Tse Kwan-ho; Poon Chan-Leung; So Yuk-Wah; Elaine Ng Yi-Lei; James Wong Jim; Candy Hau Woon-Ling
- Cinematography: Sander Lee
- Edited by: Clifton Ko Chi Sum
- Music by: Clifton Ko Chi-Sum; Richard Yuen
- Production company: Golden Harvest Productions
- Release date: 15 May 1997 (Hong Kong)
- Running time: 110 minutes
- Country: Hong Kong
- Language: Cantonese
- Box office: HK$3,807,000

The Mad Phoenix (Chinese: 南海十三郎) is a 1997 biographical film written by Raymond To Kwok-Wai, based on a drama of the same title, which depicts the life of the legendary Cantonese Opera playwright Kong Yu-kau. The film won the 17th Hong Kong Film Awards for Best Screenplay in 1998.

== Plot ==
A story teller narrates the life of the legend Cantonese opera playwright, Kong Yu-Kau (played by Tse Kwan-ho).

Kong was born in 1909 as the 13th son of a Chinese government official. He was talented and was at the top of classes at a Medical school. At a charity ball he was attracted by a girl named Lily. To pursue her love, he gave up his promising career and followed her to Shanghai. But Lily had no feeling towards him and left him stranded in streets for two years.

When Kong finally returned to his home town, he was unable to continue his medical studies so he took up teaching. In his free time he went to the Cantonese Operas especially those performed by one of the leading opera singers of the time, Sit Gok-Seen. He started writing songs and plays and proposed them to Sit. His talent was soon being recognized and Sit invited him to join his opera company as playwright. He became famous and arrogant and gave himself a pen name: Mr. Thirteen. He was extremely difficult to work with and no one was willing to serve him until Tang Ti-sheng (Chinese: 唐滌生; pinyin: Táng Díshēng) came and worked as a copyist and assistant to him. They became good friends for many years.

When Guangzhou fell to the hands of Japan in the 1930s, Kong went to Hong Kong and continue to write anti-Japanese scripts. After the war against Japan ended, he returned to Guangdong, but his outspoken and eccentric manner made numerous enemies. Thus, no one asked him to write a script; and no one watched or played the anti-Japanese written by him. The Public taste had changed, but he was unwilling to comprise. In the 1950s he went back to Hong Kong and wandered in the streets. As he grew older, he became insane and was admitted to a mental hospital. He died in 1984 at the age of 74.

== Cast ==
- Tse Kwan-ho as Kiang Yu-Kou / Nam Hoi Sap-Sam Long
- Chu Wai-Lim Chu as Young Juzaburo
- Poon Chan-Leung as Tong Dik Sang
- So Yuk Wah as Mui Sin
- Elaine Ng as Lily
- Leung Hon-Wai as Sit Gok-Seen
