= Dr. Sun Yat-sen (opera) =

Opera by Huang Ruo

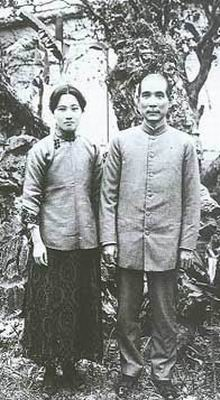
Sun and Ching-ling in 1917

Dr. Sun Yat-sen (Chinese: 中山逸仙; pinyin: Zhōngshān Yìxiān) is a 2011 Chinese-language western-style opera in three acts by the New York-based American composer Huang Ruo who was born in China and is a graduate of Oberlin College's Conservatory as well as the Juilliard School of Music. The libretto was written by established playwright and translator Candace Mui-ngam Chong. It is her first opera libretto.

The action of the opera focuses not on Sun's political life, but rather, it is a love story involving his second wife Soong Ching-Ling, a revered figure in modern Chinese history who became vice-president of the People's Republic of China until she died in 1981. Writer Lindsley Miyoshi quotes the composer's description of the opera as being "about four kinds of love—between husband and wife or between lovers, friendship, between parents and children, love of country" and he continues by noting that "what I love about opera is character building", describing the technique as "dimensionalism", while she states that the work "dramatizes what happens when these loves conflict".

Originally conceived by Opera Hong Kong (a company founded in 2003 under the artistic direction of tenor Warren Mok) and commissioned by the Hong Kong government's Leisure and Cultural Services Department and the opera company, the work was also planned in collaboration with New York City Opera's VOX Contemporary American Opera Lab annual program of new American works in progress.

For Huang Ruo, the opera became the means of celebrating the 100th anniversary of Sun Yat-sen being elected as provisional president of the new Republic of China (an office he held from 1 January 1912) and which was the culmination of the 1911 Xinhai Revolution, the revolution which ended 2,000 years of Imperial rule when Emperor Puyi, known as the Last Emperor of China, abdicated on 12 February 1912.

In terms of the music, Santa Fe Opera's general director, Charles MacKay, who chose to present the North American premiere in July 2014, has stated that he characterizes Huang Ruo's style as "a really original and striking voice", while adding that he sees the opera as "a kind of Chinese bel canto.

== Composition history ==
In her essay on the opera, Desirée Mays notes that the relationships which had developed between Sun and Charlie Soong, his longtime supporter and fundraiser, and the complications which were to arise because of the love-affair (and then marriage) of Ching-ling, Charlie's second daughter, to Sun, the impetus for the opera came from the discovery by playwright Candace Mui-ngam Chong of "a snippet of a true tale about a wedding dress intended for Ching-ling". It appears that the dress had been made some years before in anticipation of Ching-ling's future wedding, but when Charlie discovered that she had married Sun, he refused to give her the dress and ordered that it be sold by a friend. Recognizing its significance, the friend did not sell it. Chong then wrote the opera's libretto, although "while staying 98% close to historical facts, Ruo states, [it] focuses on the human side of the great man".

Huang Ruo planned the work in two versions, the first of which was designed to have a Western orchestra which would have been employed for the Beijing premiere while the second version, which was written for a Chinese orchestra, was planned to premiere at the Hong Kong Cultural Center under the direction of Yan Huichang leading the Hong Kong Chinese Orchestra. The composer chose to create two versions of the opera because, as Kelly Chung Dawson states, "he is interested in experimenting with the ways in which Eastern and Western influences can affect a composition". Huang notes:

When the vocals are accompanied by different orchestras they will reflect different qualities. In my work I like to use the word 'integration'. My goal is not for people to pinpoint 'That part is Western, that part is Eastern' - for me, that's only the surface. I want to blend and meld the influences together to create something new, but I don't consciously try to use Eastern and Western elements when I'm composing. I write what I write and whatever comes out will reflect my personality and influences."

The premiere was planned to take place in Beijing in September 2011. It would then have been followed by the premiere by Opera Hong Kong planned for 13 October 2011. However, the Beijing performances were cancelled and, instead, the premiere was given in Hong Kong.

== Performance history ==
Given the collaboration between Opera Hong Kong and New York City Opera's VOX Contemporary American Opera Lab program of new American works in progress, on 14 May 2011 a concert performance of act 1 of the opera was presented at New York University's Skirball Center for the Performing Arts.

With the fully staged Beijing production in rehearsal later in 2011, "word came down from Communist Party officials in late August: the 30 September world premiere of [the] opera [...] would be postponed indefinitely."

The New York Times reporter Nick Frisch examined some of the reasons and some of the consequences of the halt in the production, and noted that, although the Hong Kong performances were planned to continue (as did rehearsals in Beijing), another mainland China opera company, the "Guangzhou Opera House, originally scheduled to present the opera on Dec. 9, has withdrawn as well."

Frisch also commented on the musical consequences of the cancellation:

The disruption has been felt on a practical level: "They were expecting to have the score tightened and cut in Beijing, with the Western-style orchestra, before resetting it for the Hong Kong Chinese Orchestra," said a source involved in the production, referring to the ensemble of native Chinese instruments that will accompany the Hong Kong premiere. "Instead, we must adapt the score to the new timbre and make cuts at the same time."

In August 2012 with the composer present, The Santa Fe Opera announced that it would present the North American premiere of the work as part of its 2014 summer season. The production was sung in Mandarin and directed by James Robinson, currently artistic director of the Opera Theatre of Saint Louis. The scenic designer was Allen Moyer and costumes were designed by James Schuette (a Helen Hayes Award recipient for design), with lighting by Christopher Akerlind. Some members of the cast came from the premiere performances in Hong Kong.

There having been no Beijing performance with Western instruments (plus the above-noted plan which would have possibly cut and modified the score and scoring after that performance), Miyoshi states that what Santa Fe presented was "actually a world premiere, of a newly revised version incorporating both Western and Chinese instruments."

== Synopsis ==
Place: Shanghai, Yokohama,
Time: 1911 to 1918

=== Prologue ===
In a musical prologue, a wedding dress is wrapped, boxed, and taken on a journey by dancers

[However, in the premiere production, the action during the overture was observed and is described by critic James Keller as follows: "The piece begins strongly, the vibrant rhythms of its overture accompanying choreography that depicts poverty and oppression under the feudal reign of the Qing Dynasty."]

=== Act 1 ===
Before the 1911 revolution: Soong's home in Shanghai

The Chinese revolutionary, Charlie Soong, is hosting a fundraising event, ostensibly to build a church, but actually it is to generate money for the Chinese Revolutionary Alliance, which is led by Sun Yat-sen. Charlie's wife, Ni Gui-zhen, is concerned because of his anti-government stand as well as his deception, but Charlie expresses his firm support for Sun and the Revolution.

Sun Yat-sen arrives, having escaped capture by Quin soldiers, and brings with him his wife Lu Mu-zhen who follows at a much slower pace since her feet are bound in the traditional Chinese manner. Sun quickly becomes the focus of attention and the guests begin to support his cause. However, Charlie receives a notice from a messenger which advertises that Sun is a wanted man with a bounty on his head.

=== Act 2 ===
Scene 1: Yokohama, Japan, after the 1913 Revolution. The home of the Umeyas

Sun is in exile and has been given a home with his friend Umeya and his wife, both of whom offer support for Sun's cause. Also present is Charlie Soong's twenty-year-old daughter Ching-ling, who has recently returned from America and who is a firm supporter of his cause: "Your sacrifice is not for naught!", she exclaims, "You overthrew 2000 years of feudalism". As they talk, the couple clearly become more and more attracted to each other, albeit that there is a 26-year difference in their ages. However, they begin to fall in love.

Scene 2: Japan, 1915: The garden of the Umeyas' home

It is the day on which Sun and Ching-ling are to be married. She has run away from home to be with Sun. Although he loves her, he expresses his sorrow at not being able to provide her with a home, but in loving him, she is confident that they will face the world together. Charlie enters and is furious at Sun for taking his daughter. He has not given his consent to the marriage and, furthermore, he states that Sun is still married to a woman in China. But to everyone's surprise, Lu Mu-zhen enters the room and, although she sings about her misfortune and years of sacrifice, she gives Sun her signed divorce paper, thus setting him free to marry Ching-ling. Charlie is outraged. He renounces his daughter and his association with Sun and the Revolution. As he leaves, the couple turn towards the clergyman to be married.

=== Act 3 ===
Scene 1: China: The presidential palace

Under Sun's leadership and with the help of Yuan Shi-kai, an ambitious general in the Revolution, the Qing Dynasty is overthrown. Sun becomes provisional president of the new republic, but his power is limited and Yuan betrays him, thus making himself president, a step in becoming the emperor of a new dynasty.

Accompanied by his newlywed wife Ching-ling, who is pregnant, Sun gives speeches in various locations in China, gathering supports to overthrow Yuan's rule: "Why does one start a Revolution?", he asks. "To create a world where all men are equal. If we fail, we will perish together. If I die for the Revolution, it will be worthwhile."

Scene 2: The Soong residence

After Sun's house is attacked one night by Yuan's assassins, the couple is forced to flee and, during their escape, Ching-ling miscarries but eventually she is able to reach her parents' home alone. Charlie is ill and dying but he has forgiven his daughter who assures her father that she is truly in love with Sun Yat-sen. Ashamed, Charlie confesses that he had all but given up his revolutionary dreams, but Sun's indomitable determination and idealism has renewed his confidence.

Mrs. Soong then tells Ching-ling that "Charlie had prepared a wedding gift for you since you were a child and regrets he did not place it in your hands on your wedding day". In an act of reconciliation, Charlie gives Ching-ling the wedding dress that he had made for her. His final speech—a blessing upon Sun (who has arrived at the Soong residence) and Ching-ling—is a meditation on the true meaning of what it is to be a revolutionary. The two men share this spiritual reunion, revolutionaries to the end.

Scene 3: A podium: Sun addresses the people

With Ching-ling beside him, Sun delivers one of his final speeches: "I'll hold fast to my principles and forge forward. I will do all I can. Even death will not deter me", he declares as the people revere Sun as their great leader and "Father of the Revolution". The triumphal atmosphere is tempered by Sun's reiterated reminder that "success and failure are always with us." As the opera ends, a large statue of Sun Yat-Sen is revealed and Ching-ling's wedding dress re-appears, carried by the dancer.

== Roles ==
Role	Voice type	Hong Kong Premiere Cast, 13 October 2011 (Conductor: Yan Huichang)	Revised Version and American Premiere Cast, 26 July 2014 (Conductor: Carolyn Kuan)
Sun Yat-sen, Leader of the Chinese Revolutionary Alliance	tenor	Warren Mok	Joseph Dennis
Soong Ching-ling, Charlie's daughter; Sun's second wife	soprano	Yao Hong	Corinne Winters
Lu Mu-zhen, Sun's first wife	soprano	Yuki Ip	Rebecca Witty
Charlie Soong, a revolutionary	bass	Gong Dongjian	Gong Dong-Jian
Ni Kwei-Tseng, Charlie Soong's Wife	mezzo-soprano	Yang Guang	Mary Ann McCormick
Mr. Umeya, A Japanese friend of Sun	baritone	Yuan Chenye	Chen Ye Yuan
Mrs. Umeya, Umeya's wife	mezzo-soprano	Liang Ning	Katherine Carroll
Ms Ariyoshi	non-singing role	Lisa Lu	
Assassins			Yoni Rose; Patrick Guetti

== Music ==
At the time of the May 2011 VOX "preview" presentation of act 1 in New York, Nick Frisch interviewed the composer, who stated that:

Sun was a complicated man - it cannot only be big music, it must also be sensitive music....I don't worry about what is 'Chinese' or 'Western'. I was raised with both musical traditions, with operas from both cultures. I can write what comes naturally; what I feel gives a sense of Sun as a person, and the feelings of the people around him.

Frisch continues to explain that:

Huang Ruo and Chong have built many bridges to facilitate the merging of two musical worlds. The libretto is sung in Chinese and spoken interludes are in English. The choir of New York singers perform in Mandarin [at the May performance], but the score is rendered in phonetic pinyin. A score for an orchestra of Western instruments was rounded out with Chinese percussion.

[The composer] has also developed a system of musical notation to blend traditional Chinese singing seamlessly into modern Western scores. Traditional Chinese opera notation is less specific about rhythm than Western opera, giving performers more improvisation space to emote and riff off a single note. But the scale and complexity of a modern opera requires Western-style staff notation. "In Chinese opera, there is more improvisation in singing, and a more nasal, penetrating sound", Huang Ruo explains, pointing to a section in the score, "A long note is a chance to bring out more emotion".

Following the Hong Kong premiere, British critic John Allison commented on several aspects of the music in his article in the British magazine Opera:

In his first opera, Huang Ruo has sought to develop the synthesis of Chinese and Western elements already found in his previous works; his aim is not so much to mix them as to achieve an organic unity, and—to the extent that here he has composed for Western-style operatic voices singing Mandarin words—he succeeds. His vocal lines are apparently influenced not by traditional Chinese opera but by (local to Hong Kong) Cantonese narrative singing, with one syllable to one note, departing from standard Western vocalism. But the most obvious musical feature of Dr. Sun is the scoring for traditional Chinese instruments (Huang Ruo has made two versions, with an alternative for Western orchestra), realised here with subtlety by the Hong Kong Chinese Orchestra under the conductor Yan Huichang. Some of the Chinese reviewers are said to have dismissed this as a gimmick, but this colourful soundworld did not distract from the substance of the work.

Additionally—quoting Huang Ruo as " 'collaging East and West' "—Miyoshi outlines what she describes as his:

Exuberant use of percussion and his inclusion of Chinese instruments—the sheng mouth organ (which Kuan memorably calls a "Mini Me" version of the Western organ) and other bamboo winds, as well as strings such as the pipa—build an exotic atmosphere. The quanzhi, a double-reed pipe, he describes as "in its own category, unique, a character instrument, very sad, very touching—and intimate, like a human voice singing, so it pairs well with the voice, and it's not loud. I use it with the orchestra doing a low drone in the background and the voice soaring over it."

She states that this sound will accompany Ching-ling's act 3 aria when she has miscarried and is fleeing the assassins.

=== The music as performed at the premiere ===
In his analysis of the music as performed at the premiere, critic John Stege begins by noting that "These performances offer a stunning demonstration of Huang's skill in molding Eastern and Western modalities into a successful theatrical synthesis, and he continues with:

[and his] score, although through-composed, is a numbers opera at heart; arias, duets, ensembles follow a traditional pattern in what amounts to a brilliantly untraditional context. Granted, its libretto describes a love story with operatic precedents galore. The ecstatic Sun/Ching-ling duet closing the second act recalls Mimí and Rodolpho's scene concluding act one of La bohème.....
But it's the depth and rich complexity of that score, presenting a deeply felt affair of the heart instead of extravagant exoticism, that makes Dr. Sun Yat-sen unique among all those distressing Western musical chronicles of broken-hearted Asians. Here, unconventionally, a happy ending arrives for the lovers and, one hopes, for the nation. Huang's orchestra plays a major role in, well, orchestrating that action.

In his review, James Keller makes the following observations regarding the orchestration and its effects:

Wind instruments tend to work in sections, with groups of trombones or flutes or whatever alternating or overlapping in tone blocks that are displaced from each other rhythmically, ultimately to a heavy effect that leaves little room for luminosity. Indeed, rhythm was the score's strong suit, and sometimes it injected considerable momentum. By the end, though, it did not sustain a score of this length on its own, unassisted as it was by concomitant strength in harmonic direction or, most regrettably, melodic contour.

== Critical evaluations ==
Following the world premiere, a variety of critical evaluations were published. They include:

- Rodney Punt, "Dr. Sun Yat-sen Triumphs in American Premiere", San Francisco Classical Voice, July 26, 2014 on sfcv.org
- James Keller, "East meets West in Dr. Sun Yat-sen, The Santa Fe New Mexican, July 27, 2014 on santafenewmexican.com
- Corinna da Fonseca-Wollheim, "A Revolutionary Who Cannot Be Silenced: Dr. Sun Yat-sen in the American Premiere at Santa Fe Opera", The New York Times, July 27, 2014 on nytimes.com
- John Stege, "A Brilliant Sun: Worth the journey", Santa Fe Reporter, July 30, 2014 on sfreporter.com
- Scott Cantrell, "Dr. Sun Yat-Sen dramatic, but not entirely convincing", The Dallas Morning News, July 31, 2014 on dallasnews.com
