= Heaven in the Dark =

2016 Hong Kong film by Steve Yuen

- Film poster
- Traditional Chinese: 暗色天堂
- Simplified Chinese: 暗色天堂
- Hanyu Pinyin: Àn Sè Tiān Táng
- Jyutping: Ngam3 Sik1 Tin1 Tong4
- Directed by: Steve Yuen
- Screenplay by: Steve Yuen
- Based on: French Kiss by Candace Chong
- Produced by: Albert Lee; Daniel Yu
- Starring: Jacky Cheung; Karena Lam
- Cinematography: Fisher Yu; Wong Man-nok
- Edited by: Shirley Yip
- Music by: Jun Kung; Clement Fung
- Production companies: Emperor Motion Pictures; Twelfth Film
- Distributed by: Emperor Motion Pictures
- Release date: 24 March 2016
- Running time: 99 minutes
- Country: Hong Kong
- Language: Cantonese
- Box office: US$416,649

Heaven in the Dark is a 2016 Hong Kong drama film directed by Steve Yuen, starring Jacky Cheung and Karena Lam. The film is adapted from the play, French Kiss by Candace Chong.

== Plot ==
After a drunken night out, well respected pastor Marco (Jacky Cheung) shares a kiss with Michelle (Karena Lam), a parishioner at his church who he had been growing close to. A seemly consensual kiss turns scandalise after Marco is accused of sexual harassment and a court case ensues.

== Cast ==
- Jacky Cheung as Reverend Marco To
- Karena Lam as Michelle
- Lan Law as Prosecution Lawyer
- Anthony Wong as Barrister Francis Lee
- Wong He as Reverend Cheung
- Edmond So as Mr. Lam
- Michelle Wai as Yee
- Tyson Chak as Praetor
- Catherine Chau as Wong Yuen-yuen
- Cheuk Wan-chi as Cheung Oi-wah
- Rosa Maria Velasco as Susanna
- Chu Pak-him as Paul
- Dayo Wong as Court audit
- James Li as court audit

== Soundtrack ==
=== Featured song ===
No.	Title	Writer(s)	Performer	Length
1.	"Over Me"	Jun Kung and Tien Chong	Tien Chong	02:02

== Reception ==
At the Hong Kong box office, the film took US$410,040 with less than favourable reviews from both the South China Morning Post and the Straits Times. Despite negative reviews, Jacky Cheung and Karena Lam were nominated for Best Actor and Best Actress respectively at the 36th Hong Kong Film Awards. At the 53rd Golden Horse Film Festival and Awards Cheung again was nominated for Best Actor.
