= Shanghai, Shanghai =

1990 Hong Kong film by Teddy Robin

- Film poster
- Traditional Chinese: 亂世兒女
- Simplified Chinese: 乱世儿女
- Hanyu Pinyin: Luàn Shì Ér Nǚ
- Jyutping: Lyun6 Sai3 Ji4 Neoi2
- Directed by: Teddy Robin
- Screenplay by: Calvin Poon; Raymond To
- Story by: Yuen Kai-chi
- Produced by: Corey Yuen
- Starring: Sammo Hung; Yuen Biao; George Lam; Anita Mui
- Cinematography: Wong Bo Man
- Edited by: Poon Hung
- Music by: Teddy Robin
- Production companies: Bo Ho Films; Paragon Films
- Distributed by: Golden Harvest
- Release date: 20 January 1990
- Running time: 89 minutes
- Country: Hong Kong
- Language: Cantonese
- Box office: HK$13,305,900

Shanghai, Shanghai, also known as The Shanghai Encounter, (Chinese: 亂世兒女) is a 1990 Hong Kong action film directed by Teddy Robin. Set in 1930s Shanghai, the film stars Sammo Hung, Yuen Biao, George Lam and Anita Mui.

== Plot ==
Sammo Hung is the main villain of the film, who wants to hurt certain people throughout until Yuen Biao steps in to save the day.

== Cast ==
- Sammo Hung as Chin Hung-yun
- Yuen Biao as Little Tiger
- George Lam as Big Tiger
- Anita Mui as Mary Sung Chia-pi
- Lawrence Cheng as Chen Ta-wen
- Sandy Lam as Pao
- Lo Lieh as Pai
- Mang Hoi as Hai
- Louis Roth as General William Pottinger
- Tien Niu as Ting-ting
- Kirk Wong as Chiang
- Yuen Tak as Acrobat

== Crew ==
- Fu Chi-chung – art direction
- Teddy Robin – director, music
- Dion Lam – action director
- Peggy Lee – line production manager
- Corey Yuen – producer, action director
- Yuen Tak – action director

== Sources ==
- Luan shi er nu, IMDb. Accessed 19 October 2012
