= Ko Tin-lung =

Hong Kong actor, director and playwright (died 2022)

- 古天農
- Born: 1954
- Died: June 23, 2022 (aged 67–68)
- Occupations: Actor; director; playwright

Ko Tin-lung (1954 – 23 June 2022) was a Hong Kong actor, director and playwright. He became the first Chinese artistic director for Chung Ying Theatre Company.

Over his career of nearly four decades, he helped produce hundreds of plays, most notably One of the Lucky Ones (1990), I Have a Date With Spring (1992) and The Mad Phoenix (1993). He won four Hong Kong Drama Awards in the categories Best Actor and Best Director. He died in June 2022 in his sleep at the age of 69.

== Biography ==
=== Early life and education ===
Ko was born in Hong Kong and grew up in Wong Tai Sin District, Kowloon. He attended Choi Po Sin School (Primary Section), Fatima English Primary School and St. Francis Xavier's College. In Form 1, he wrote, directed and acted in a comedic shadow play with members of the Chinese Society. In Form 4, he co-wrote The Garbage Chronicle (Note: Unofficial translation from 垃圾記) with Ling Kar-kan, later director of the Planning Department, and won the Youth Literary Awards for Drama (青年文學獎 劇本獎). He later applied to perform in a production after reading a full script in The Chinese Student Weekly, published by Yuen Lup-fun and Lam Dai-hing (林大慶). He appeared in Dust (Note: Unofficial translation from 塵) at Hong Kong City Hall in 1972 for the Joint School Drama Project (校協戲劇社), where he began his training in drama. Around this time, he lived in Tsim Sha Tsui, and took the Star Ferry each day to rehearsal. Unable to enter the "sixth form" preparatory course, he transferred to New Method College to complete the course and was admitted to the Chinese University of Hong Kong. He graduated from the Sociology Department of Chung Chi College.

His interest in drama began in middle school, and he was accompanied by drama throughout his middle school and university days. While in university, he was warned for frequently skipping classes to attend rehearsals. After obtaining a degree in 1979, he studied the Diploma of Education of the University of Hong Kong, and also served as an English and economics teacher at Chan Shu Kui Memorial Secondary School.

=== Career ===
In 1983, Ko joined the Hong Kong Repertory Theater as a full-time actor, beginning his professional theatre career. He acted in A Line (Note: Chinese 一條線) (1983), Amadeus (Note: Chinese 莫札特之死) (1983), Pu Yi (Note: Chinese 溥儀) (1983), The Importance of Being Earnest (Note: Chinese 不可兒戲) (1984), The Merchant of Venice (Note: Chinese 威尼斯商人) (1984), Marat/Sade (Note: Chinese 馬拉/沙德) (1984), 1841 (1985), among others. Later, he also involved in play-writing and directing. His first self-written and directed play was Between Teachers and Students (Note: Unofficial translation from 師生之間) (1985).

In 1987, he received the Lee Hysan Foundation Grant from the Asian Cultural Council, which enabled him to travel to New York, USA. Although he originally planned to undertake formal studies at the New York University Tisch School of the Arts, his learning ultimately took place through hands-on experience with professional theatre companies and observations of productions. He participated in La MaMa Experimental Theatre Club's dance-opera production of Mythos Oedipus and professional Broadway productions of Circle Repertory Company. At Circle Repertory Company, he also served as assistant director in Borderlines. In 1988, he wrote and directed a play-in-progress Sinodyssey (Note: Chinese 裂國列民) with La MaMa Experimental Theatre Club.

In 1989, he returned to Hong Kong and became assistant artistic director of the Hong Kong Repertory Theater. In 1990, he created and directed One of the Lucky Ones (Note: Chinese 伴我同行) (1990), which he adopted from Lucy Ching Man-fai's autobiography. It was later adopted into a film of the same title, which he acted in and produced. In the following years, he collaborated with Chung Ying Theatre Company for the first time and translated Noël Greig's Rainbow's Ending, Willy Russell's Educating Rita, and John Gardiner's The Dracula Spectacula. He also served as the director for Raymond To's I Have a Date with Spring (1992) and The Mad Phoenix (1993).

In 1993, he joined the Chung Ying Theatre Company as the artistic director, becoming the troupe's first Chinese artistic director. Since then, he began promoting productions of original plays and theatre-in-education. Multiple initiatives were launched under his leadership. In 1994, the company announced their first season of all local original plays, including Killer Instinct, The School and I. In 2000, the Borrett Laboratory began as an initiative to explore originality in public performances; And, in 2002, Playwrights' Theatre aimed at supporting playwrights at their early career, such as Candace Chong and Leung Shing-him (yatyau).

In 2005, Ko finished One of the Lucky Ones (Step 2). It was staged with the remade of previous version. He continued to write and direct The Merchant of China (1999). In March 2019, he retired from his role as artistic director after 26 years of service.

=== Outside theatre ===
Ko had written columns to multiple publications. While he was still in New York, he began writing a column surrounding Broadway theatre for The New Evening Post on 31 December 1987. In 2003, he started writing columns for the Hong Kong Economic Times and Wen Wei Po.

=== Death ===
On June 23, 2022, Ko Tin-lung was found to have died in his sleep. The news was announced by Raymond To on the same day.

== Works ==
=== Theatre ===
==== Acting ====
- A Line (Note: Chinese 一條線) (1983)
- Amadeus (Note: Chinese 莫札特之死) (1983)
- Pu Yi (Note: Chinese 溥儀) (1983)
- The Importance of Being Earnest (Note: Chinese 不可兒戲) (1984)
- The Merchant of Venice (Note: Chinese 威尼斯商人) (1984)
- Marat/Sade (Note: Chinese 馬拉/沙德) (1984)
- 1841 (1985)
- Mythos Oedipus (1987)

==== Directing ====
^ Plays that he also wrote

- Between Teachers and Students (Note: literal translation from the Chinese title 師生之間)^ (1985)
- Sinodyssey^ (1988), a play about overseas Chinese (Note: including those from Hong Kong, China, Taiwan and American born) in the 60's US
- One of the Lucky Ones^ (1990), adopted from Lucy Ching Man-fai's autobiography.
- Raymond To's Tokyo Blues (1991)
- Raymond To's I Have a Date with Spring (1992)
- Raymond To's The Legend of the Mad Phoenix (1993), a.k.a. The Mad Phoenix.
- The School and I^ (1993)
- Tan Tarn How's The First Emperor's Last Days (1998)
- The Merchant of China^ (1999), adopted from the life of Hu Xueyan.

==== Translating ====
- Noël Greig's Rainbow's Ending (1990)
- Willy Russell's Educating Rita (1991)
- John Gardiner's The Dracula Spectacula (1992)
