= Kung Sheung Daily News =

Chinese language daily newspaper in Hong Kong

The Kung Sheung Daily News
- Type: Daily newspaper
- Owners: Ho Shai Lai; (via The Industrial and Commercial Daily Press Limited)
- Publisher: The Industrial and Commercial Daily Press Limited
- Founded: 1925
- Ceased publication: 30 November 1984 (last publication)
- Political alignment: pro-Kuomintang
- Language: Chinese; (Traditional Chinese characters)
- Country: Hong Kong
- Sister newspapers: The Kung Sheung Evening News; The Tien Kwong Morning News
- OCLC number: 633493711
- Free online archives: HK Public Libraries MMIS

The Kung Sheung Daily News
- Traditional Chinese: 工商日報
- Simplified Chinese: 工商日报
- Jyutping: Gung1 soeng1 jat6 bou3
- Cantonese Yale: Gūng sēung yaht bou
- Literal meaning: Industrial [&] Commercial Daily News
Transcriptions
Standard Mandarin
- Hanyu Pinyin: Gōng Shāng Rì Bào
Yue: Cantonese
- Yale Romanization: Gūng sēung yaht bou
- Jyutping: Gung1 soeng1 jat6 bou3

The Kung Sheung Daily News was a Chinese language newspaper published in Hong Kong under British colonial rule. It was owned indirectly by Ho Shai-lai (何世禮), a former Republic of China general and son of Hong Kong tycoon Robert Ho Tung. It was a pro-Kuomintang newspaper and ran according to the Minguo calendar.

In tandem with The Kung Sheung Evening News (工商晚報), it was published by "The Industrial and Commercial Daily Press Limited" (工商日報有限公司), which was incorporated on 10 November 1928.

In 1954, Kung Sheung co-founded – with three other major papers – the Newspaper Society of Hong Kong.

The Kung Sheung Daily News was also published as an "export imprint" (Chinese: 外埠版; lit. 'Outer Port version'), targeting Taiwan.

The publisher was wound up on 26 December 1996, many years after the newspapers ceased publication.

== History ==
Sir Robert Ho Tung acquired Kung Sheung Daily News in 1929. At the time, the newspaper was a loss-making business. Under Ho Tung's ownership, it became one of the three leading Chinese language newspapers in Hong Kong in the 1950s (the other two being Sing Tao Daily and Wah Kiu Yat Po, according to the Newspaper Society of Hong Kong.

Shortly after the signing of the Sino-British Joint Declaration, Kung Sheung Daily News ceased publication, saying it was failing to make a profit and could not see a way forward.

== Gallery ==
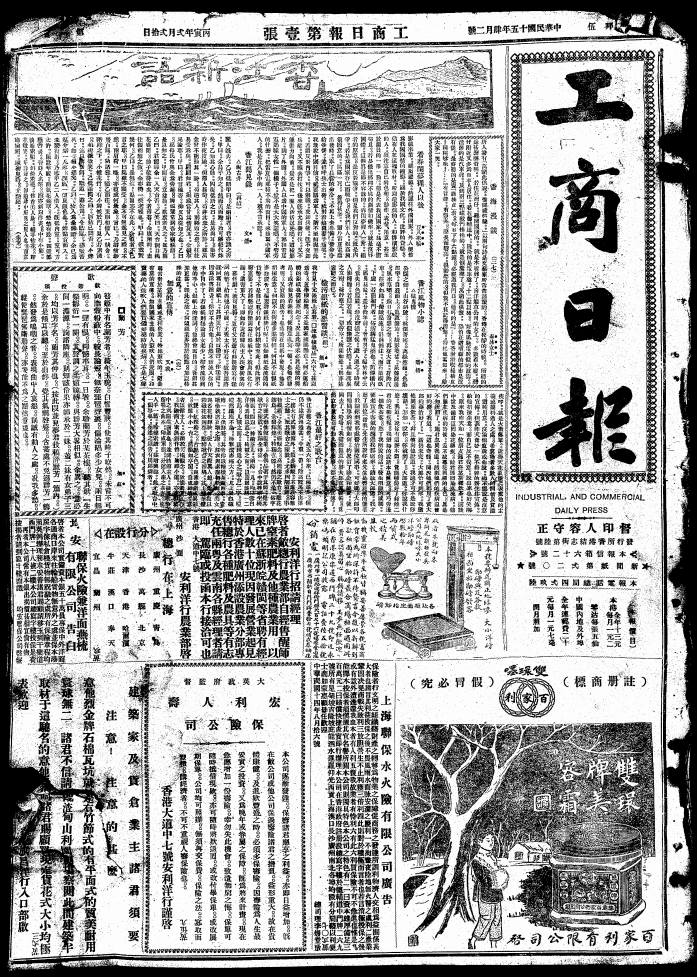
Front page, 1926

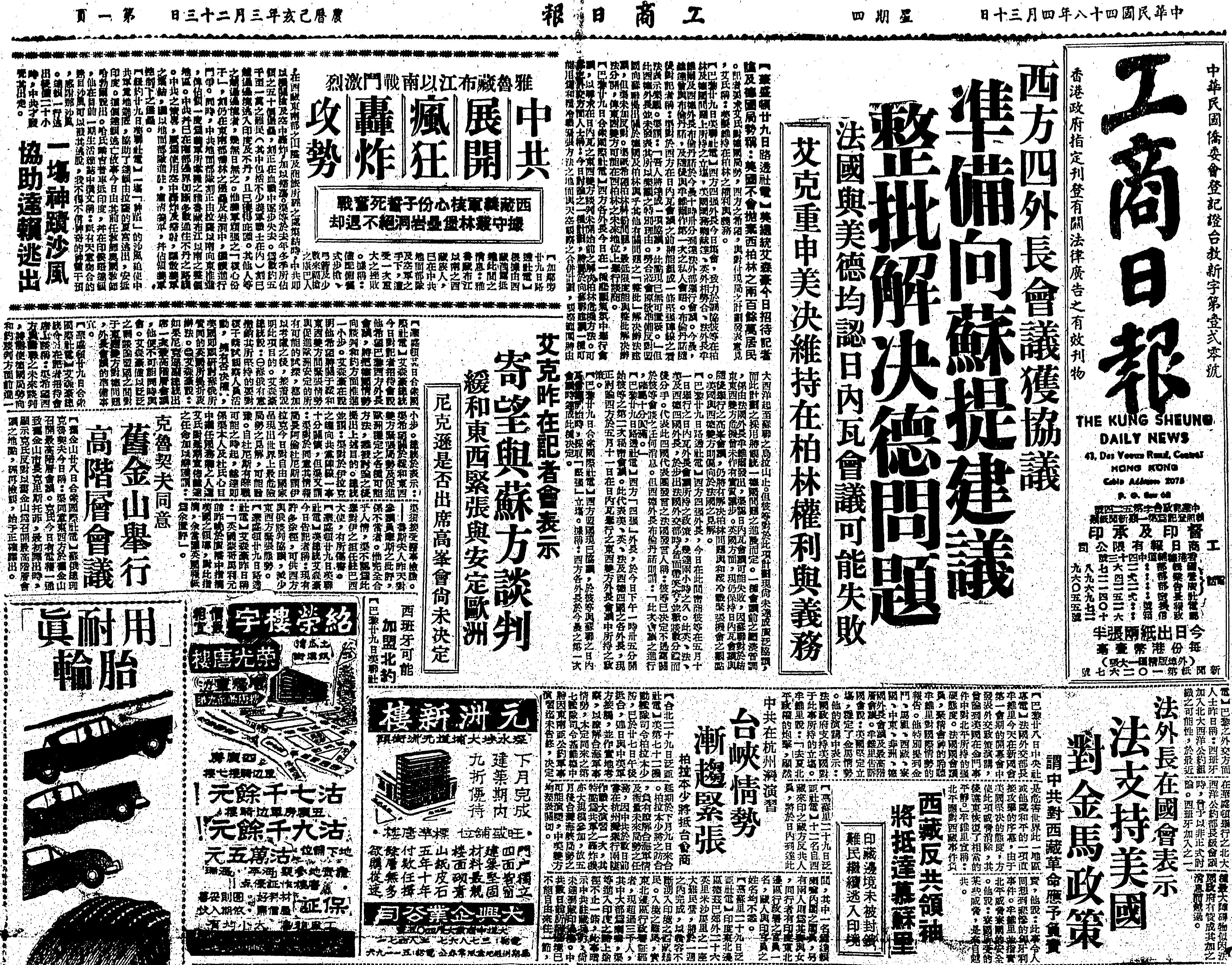
Upper half of the front page, 1959
