= Poon Wai-sum =

Hong Kong playwright and theatre director

Paul Poon Wai-sum (Chinese: 潘惠森; born 1950s) is a Hong Kong playwright, theatre director and educator. Since 1986, Poon has created more than 50 plays. He is best known for a group of five plays collectively called the "Insect Series," in which five insects symbolize Hongkongers during the 1997 handover period. His plays are noted for their deployment of vernacular Cantonese, fragmented narratives, and absurdist humour. His artistic style is often associated with ambiguous characters, unconventional dramatic situations, and playful yet disorienting dialogue.

From 1993 to 2012, he served as the artistic director of the Prospects Theatre Company (新域劇團). Between 2012 and 2017, he served the Hong Kong Academy for Performing Arts (HKAPA) School of Drama, eventually becoming dean of the School of Drama in 2017. In 2023, he was appointed the artistic director of the Hong Kong Repertory Theatre.

== Early life and education ==
Poon was born in the 1950s and spent his childhood in Wong Chuk Hang, Hong Kong, helping with farming and raising pigeons. He left school after Secondary Four and worked briefly as an elevator maintenance apprentice for Jardines. Finding the job unsatisfying, he later returned to education after meeting a former classmate in Tsim Sha Tsui who was involved in creative work. This experience led him to develop an interest in literature and eventually pursue studies in Taiwan and the United States.

He later studied English at Soochow University in Taiwan before pursuing theatre studies at Michigan State University and Asian Studies at the University of California, Santa Barbara. He returned to Hong Kong from Taiwan in 1988.

== Career ==
In 1985, he wrote his first play, In the Shade of the Woods (榕樹蔭下的森林), won the scriptwriting category in the Urban Council Libraries Chinese Literary Creation Awards. (Note: Chinese 市政局圖書館「中文文學創作獎」劇本組冠軍) It was staged by the Hong Kong Repertory Theatre in the following year.

From 1993 to 2012, he served as the artistic director of the Prospects Theatre Company (新域劇團). During his tenure, he is known to be establishing series-based production as the company's developmental direction. Under this approach, he produced a large number of works, including the "Water Margin Series", the "Insect Series" (昆蟲系列), the "Pearl Delta Series" (珠三角系列), and the "Anthropocene Series" (人間系列).

In 2001, he published his novel, The Diary of Song, online, coinciding with the revival of his 1995 play The Mosquito Hero. In 2005, he collaborated to develop an animated film adaptation of the novel. The 2017 stage version of The Diary of Song is based on this film. Wong Wai-yee of the IATC praised the work for using gender contrasts to depict men under societal pressure and women showing intelligence and loyalty, reflecting on patriarchal society.

In 2012, Poon joined the HKAPA School of Drama as a resident playwright and discipline leader of dramatic writing. He later served as the dean of the School of Drama from 2017 to 2022. In 2023, he was appointed the artistic director of the Hong Kong Repertory Theatre.

== Plays ==
- In the Shade of the Woods (Note: Chinese title 榕樹蔭下的森林) (1985)
- Central in Ruins (Note: Literal translation from Chinese title 廢墟中環) (March 1985)
- Crying Weekend (Note: Literal translation from Chinese title 哭泣周末) (October 1989)
- Summer Breeze (Note: Literal translation from Chinese title 夏日春風) (1990)
- As If Dancing on the Sand Dunes (Note: Literal translation from Chinese title 仿佛在沙丘上跳舞) (1992)
- The Legend of the Road Hero (Note: Literal translation from Chinese title 馬路英雄傳) (December 1993)
- The Isle (Note: Chinese title 小島芸香; the play was remade into 小島‧餘香 with the same English title) (March 1994)
- Oh! Tai O (Note: Literal translation from Chinese title 哦！大澳) (1995)
- Who likes to be on the bottom? (Note: Literal translation from Chinese title 誰愛在誰人下面) (January 1996)
- "Water Margin Series" (adaptations)
  - The Mosquito Hero (Note: Chinese title 武松打蚊) (May 1995) - nominated 5th Hong Kong Drama Award for Best Script
  - The Black and the Blue of a Man (Note: Chinese title 李逵的藍與黑) (1990s)
  - Picking Flowers from Song Jiang (Note: Literal translation from Chinese title 宋江採花) (1990s)
  - The Diary of Song (Note: Chinese title 武松日記) (written in 2001; produced in 2017) - adapted from his novel
- The Oak Tree (Note: Chinese title 闖進一棵橡樹的年輪) (1996) - nominated 6th Hong Kong Drama Award for Best Script
- "Insect Series" (昆蟲系列)
  - The Cockroach that Flies like a Helicopter (Note: Chinese title 雞春咁大隻曱甴兩頭岳) (1997) - won 7th Hong Kong Drama Award for Best Script
  - The Rising Ants (Note: Chinese title 螞蟻上樹) (1998) - nominated 8th Hong Kong Drama Award for Best Script
  - Cricket in My Life (Note: Chinese title 三姊妹與哥哥和一隻蟋蟀) (1999) - won 9th Hong Kong Drama Award for Best Script
  - To Kill or To Be Killed (Note: Chinese title 螳螂捕蟬) (2000) - nominated 10th Hong Kong Drama Award for Best Script
  - Spiders in Meditation (Note: Chinese title 在天台上冥想的蜘蛛) (2001) - won 11th Hong Kong Drama Award for Best Script
- Hu Xueyan, My Dear (Note: Chinese title 親愛的，胡雪巖) (2000) - won 10th Hong Kong Drama Award for Best Script
- Ng Wong the Swordsman (2001) - nominated 11th Hong Kong Drama Award for Best Script
- Of Fire And Fireworks (2002) - nominated 12th Hong Kong Drama Award for Best Script
- "Pearl Delta Series" (珠三角系列) trilogy
  - Dragon Head (Note: Chinese title 龍頭) (October 2003)
  - The Massage King (Note: Chinese title 大汗推拿) (January 2006)
  - Night and Dream in the South (Note: Chinese title 南方的夜特別長) (October 2006)
- Of Minds and No-mind (2004) - nominated 14th Hong Kong Drama Award for Best Script
- The Massage King (2006) - nominated 16th Hong Kong Drama Award for Best Script
- Dust and Dawn (Note: Chinese title 我自在江湖) (2007) - nominated 17h Hong Kong Drama Award for Best Script
- "Anthropocene Series" (人間系列) trilogy
  - The Happiest Day I Lost (Note: Chinese title 人間煙火) (March 2009)
  - The Memorable and the Forgettable (Note: Chinese title 人間往事) (March 2010)
  - To Those Who Deserve to Die (Note: Chinese title 遺禍人間) (February 2011)
- Bun in the Cave (Note: Chinese title 敦煌‧流沙‧包) (November 2009)
- Peacock Man and Durian Woman (2010) - nominated 20th Hong Kong Drama Award for Best Script and Best Director (Comedy/Farce)
- Show Flat (Note: Chinese title 示範單位) (2012)
- The Emperor, his Mom, a Eunuch and a Man (Note: Chinese title 都是龍袍惹的禍) (2013) - nominated 23rd Hong Kong Drama Award for Best Script
- Confrontations (2022) - nominated 31st Hong Kong Drama Award for Best Script and Best Director (Comedy/Farce)

== Publications ==
Poon, Wai-sum (2021). 潘惠森劇本集：昆蟲系列 [Poon Wai-sum Script Collection: Insect Series] (in Chinese (Hong Kong)). International Association of Theatre Critics (Hong Kong). ISBN 9789887431992.
