= Raymond To =

Hong Kong playwright and filmmaker

Raymond To Kwok-Wai
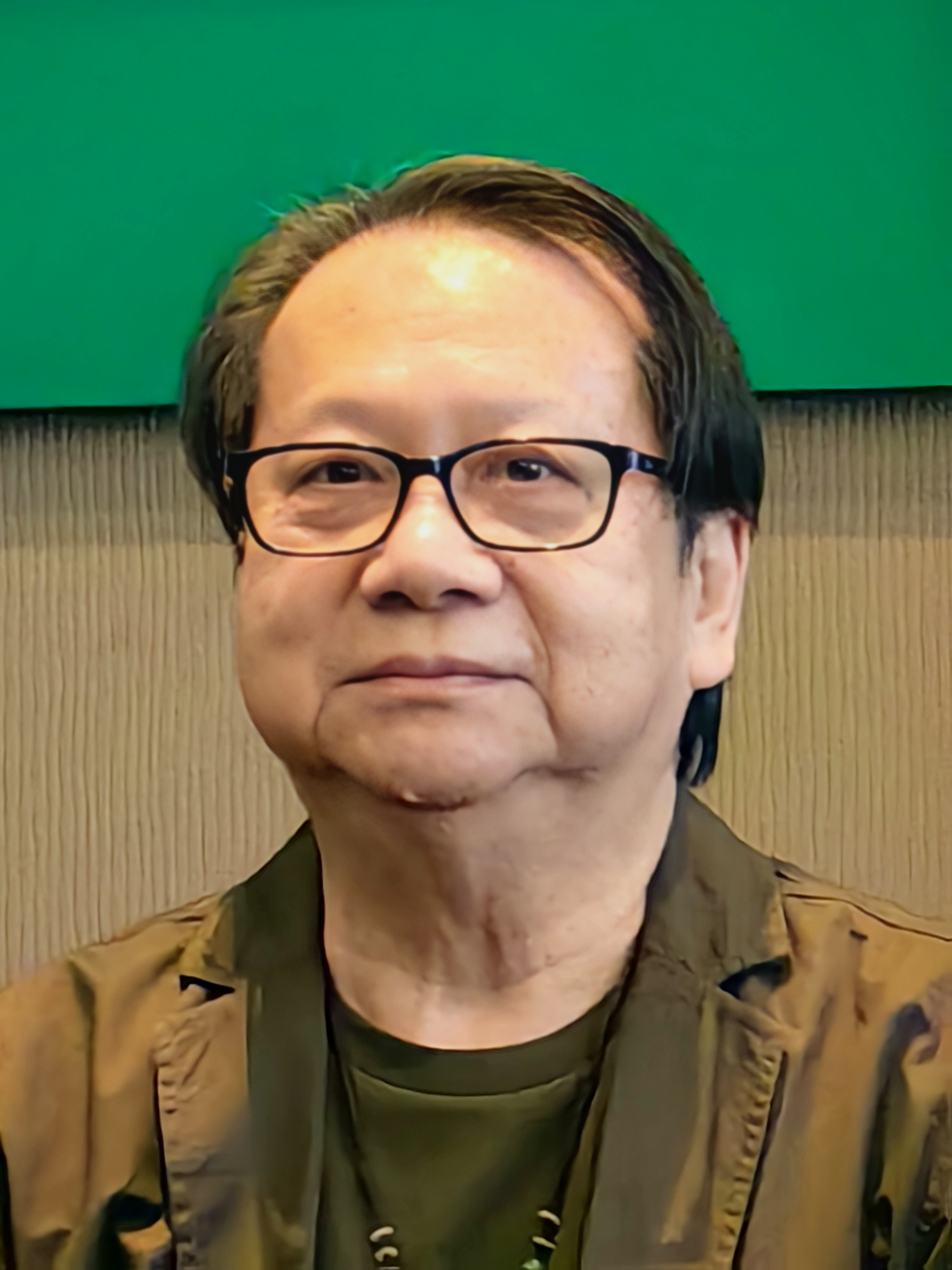
- Raymond To at 2024 Hong Kong Book Fair
- Born: 13 August 1946 (age 80); China
- Occupations: Dramatist, screenwriter & film director
- Awards: Hong Kong Film Awards – Best Screenplay; 1994 I Have a Date with Spring; 1997 The Mad Phoenix Golden Horse Awards – Best Adapted Screenplay; 1997 The Mad Phoenix

Chinese name
- Traditional Chinese: 杜國威
- Simplified Chinese: 杜国威
Transcriptions
Standard Mandarin
- Hanyu Pinyin: Dù guówēi
Yue: Cantonese
- Jyutping: Dou6 gwok3 wai1

Raymond To Kwok-Wai (Chinese: 杜國威; born 13 August 1946) is a Hong Kong dramatist, screenwriter and film director.

He has created more than 60 stage plays, including the critically acclaimed I Have a Date with Spring and Mad Phoenix, both of which were adapted into successful films and earned him the Hong Kong Film Award for Best Screenplay in 1994 and 1997, respectively. His play I am Hong Kong (1985) toured Australia, while his television work for RTHK includes the popular series Under the Roof (屋簷下) and Below the Lion Rock.

== Early life ==
Raymond To has a sister, Mei Zi (formerly Duyan Zhi), who is an announcer. During his childhood, Raymond had the reputation of being a "broadcasting prodigy" after he participated in Radio Television Hong Kong and Rediffusion Television programmes. In his early years, he performed in movies including The Fatherless Son (1956) and The Affairs of Miss Ping (Note: A series of two films: 飄萍恨(上集) & 飄萍恨(下集); also titled Never Be Lonely.) (1960-61).

In 1971 and 1982, Raymond graduated from the Department of Geography at University of Hong Kong and the Hong Kong Institute of Education. After graduation, he became a high school teacher at Ho Lap College and was responsible for the school drama club. Andy Lau was one of his students. At this time, he was already an amateur writer.

== Career ==
In 1979, he wrote his first play Ball, which was nominated the most outstanding in the Hong Kong Repertory Theatre original script project. He was then invited to adapt Lao She's Rickshaw Boy, marking the beginning of his career.

Since 1993, To became the playwright-in-residence of the Hong Kong Repertory Theatre.

On 3 June 1995, Raymond To, together with Ko Tin-lung and Clifton Ko co-founded the Spring Stage Production Company. In addition to being the playwright, he is also an artistic director. Although the majority of his original work is for the stage, some have been adapted for film.

Raymond To was elected as the 4th president of the Hong Kong Screenwriters' Guild in 1997 and again in 1999. During 2000, he directed his own work for the first time, Forever and Ever, to much acclaim.

== Filmography (1956–2005) ==
Year	English title	Chinese title	Credited as
1956	The Fatherless Son (Part 1 & 2)	遺腹子	Actor
1960	The Affairs of Miss Ping (Part 1)	飄萍恨(上集)	Actor
1961	The Affairs of Miss Ping (Part 2)	飄萍恨(下集)	Actor
1982	My Name is Twin Legs	我叫雙腿	Writer
1984	Shanghai Blues	上海之夜	Second Draft Writer
1986	Goodbye Mammie	再見媽咪	Writer
1986	Peking Opera Blues	刀馬旦	Writer
1988	Call Girl '88	應召女郎1988	Writer
1989	Mr. Sunshine	開心巨無霸	Writer
1990	Shanghai, Shanghai	亂世兒女	Writer
1990	To Spy with Love!!	小心間諜	Writer
1990	When Fortune Smiles	無敵幸運星	Writer
1991	Zodiac Killers	極道追蹤	Writer
1992	Taking Manhattan	買起曼克頓	Writer
1992	Shogun and Little Kitchen	伙頭福星	Writer
1993	The Bride with White Hair 2	白髮魔女2	Writer
1994	Oh! My Three Guys	三個相愛的少年	Writer
1994	One of the Lucky Ones	伴我同行	Writer
1994	I Have a Date with Spring	我和春天有個約會	Producer
1994	It's a Wonderful Life	大富之家	Writer
1994	The Returning	等著你回來	Writer
1995	The Umbrella Story	人間有情	Writer
1995	Sea Root	海根	Director and Writer
1995	Paradise Hotel	偷錯隔牆花	Producer
1996	Hu-Du-Men	虎度門	Writer
1996	Stooge, My Love	懵仔多情	Writer
1997	Ah Fai, the Dumb	天才與白痴	Writer
1997	My Dad Is a Jerk!	對不起，多謝你	Writer
1997	The Mad Phoenix	南海十三郎	Writer
1998	Ninth Happiness	九星報喜	Writer
1999	The Doctor in Spite of Himself	醫神	Writer
2000	What Is a Good Teacher	自從他來了	Writer
2001	Forever and Ever	地久天長	Director & Writer
2001	Love au Zen, The Dark Tales	愛情觀自在	Writer
2002	May & August	五月八月	Director & Writer
2003	Master Q: Incredible Pet Detective	老夫子動畫大電影：反斗神探	Writer
2003	Miss Du Shi Niang	Miss杜十娘	Director & Writer
2004	Forever Yours	浪漫春情	Producer & Writer
2005	Perhaps Love	如果愛	Writer

== Awards and nominations ==
=== Hong Kong Drama Awards ===
Year	Award	Category	Work	Result
1992	1st Hong Kong Drama Awards	Best Script	Tokyo blues 扶桑過客	Won
1993	2nd Hong Kong Drama Awards	Best Script	A Foxy Tale 聊齋新誌	Won
1993	2nd Hong Kong Drama Awards	Best Script	I Have a Date with Spring 我和春天有個約會	Nominated
1994	3rd Hong Kong Drama Awards	Best Script	The Mad Phoenix 南海十三郎	Won
1996	5th Hong Kong Drama Awards	Best Script	Forever Yours 人生唯願多知己	Nominated
1997	6th Hong Kong Drama Awards	Best Script	Love à la Zen 愛情觀自在	Nominated
1999	8th Hong Kong Drama Awards	Best Script	Butterfly Lovers 梁祝	Nominated
2000	9th Hong Kong Drama Awards	Best Script	Forever and Ever 地久天長	Nominated
2009	18th Hong Kong Drama Awards	Best Script	Love You Forever 我愛阿愛	Won

=== Film awards ===
Year	Award	Category	Work	Result
1994	14th Hong Kong Film Awards	Best Screenplay	I Have a Date with Spring	Won
1996	15th Hong Kong Film Awards	Best Screenplay	The Umbrella Story	Nominated
1996	33rd Golden Horse Awards	Best Adapted Screenplay	Hu-Du-Men	Nominated
1997	16th Hong Kong Film Awards	Best Screenplay	Hu-Du-Men	Nominated
1997	34th Golden Horse Awards	Best Adapted Screenplay	The Mad Phoenix	Won
1998	17th Hong Kong Film Awards	Best Screenplay	The Mad Phoenix	Won
2006	25th Hong Kong Film Awards	Best Screenplay	Perhaps Love	Nominated
