= Huang Ruo =

Chinese-born composer, pianist and vocalist

Huang Ruo 黃若
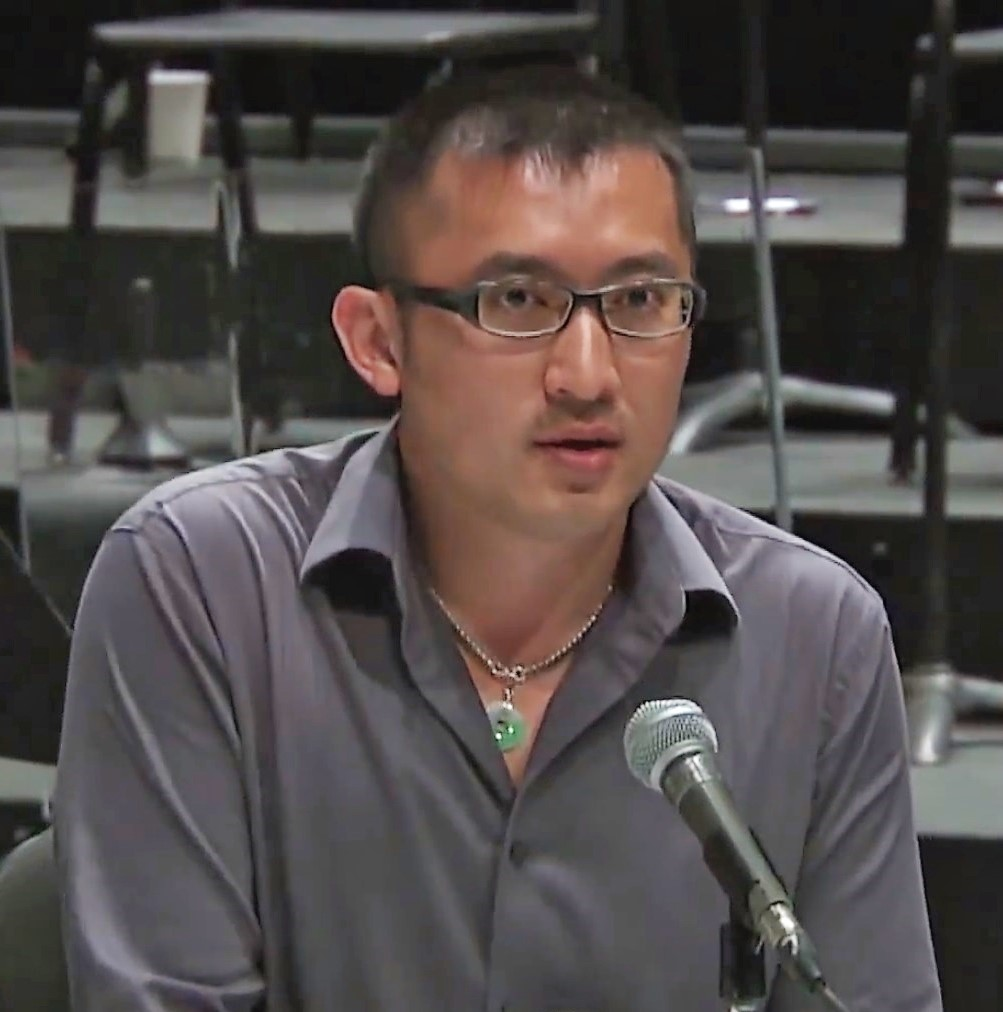
- Huang at the 2012 Cabrillo Festival of Contemporary Music

Background information
- Born: 1976 (age 49–50); Qionghai, Hainan, China
- Origin: China
- Occupations: Composer, pianist and vocalist
- Website: https://www.huangruoprojects.com/

Huang Ruo (黃若, born 1976) is a Chinese-born composer, pianist and vocalist who now lives in the United States.

== Biography ==
Born on Hainan Island off the southern coast of China in 1976, Huang was taught piano and composition from the age of six by his father, a well-known Chinese composer. When he was 12, he was admitted to the Shanghai Conservatory of Music where he was instructed in both traditional Chinese and western music by Deng Erbo. In 1995, after winning the Henry Mancini Award at the International Film and Music Festival in Switzerland, he continued his education in the United States at the Oberlin Conservatory of Music in Ohio and at the Juilliard School in New York City where he studied composition with Samuel Adler, receiving a doctorate.

In 2001, Huang was one of the founding members of the International Contemporary Ensemble, an orchestral group of some 30 musicians which often performs works by European, Latin American, and Asian composers. In 2005, he founded the performance company, Future in Reverse (FIRE), specializing in multimedia and cross-genre projects.

In 2010, Huang's composition "The Yellow Earth" won the Celebrate Asia! composition competition. It was performed by the Seattle Symphony at a concert in January 2011. The piece is a rearrangement of the third movement of his sheng concerto "The Color Yellow" which brings together music produced by a Chinese instrument accompanied by a Western orchestra.

In 2015-2016, Huang was the first composer-in-residence of Concertgebouw, Amsterdam.

In 2017, Huang Ruo and the Del Sol Quartet received a Hewlett Foundation 50 Commission to create ANGEL ISLAND, an oratorio based on the Chinese poems carved in the walls of the Angel Island Immigration Station detention barracks. The work premiered in 2021 at the Presidio Theatre and on Angel Island, with subsequent performances at the Smithsonian National Museum of Asian Art with the US Air Force Singing Sergeants, the Singapore International Festival of Arts, and the Brooklyn Academy of Music.

== Musical style ==
Huang Ruo's aesthetic is his attempt to "define connections between space, time, and sound. It is related to architecture and modern art in general, which I am a big lover of."

Describing dimensionalism in detail Ruo writes,

"The structure of two-dimensional art, in my opinion, cries out to be put in perspective with more and more in-depth experiences than are visible on the canvas. In architecture I find so much newness; it is an art form that can reinvent itself constantly by changing how it relates to its environment, not only on the outside but on the inside as well. I think about music that way — in many dimensions — as space, time, color, and sound. Shapes of music are also dimensional, aren’t they? I feel music is life, breathing and moving. When you sit in front of the stage at a performance, you get trapped. One should be able to walk around the sound source, or be surrounded by it. But since sound moves as well, I like to imagine sound being a solid matter, and try to describe it in abstract shapes and colors. Seeing it through different lighting would change its appearance constantly, creating a variety of endless possibilities"

— Dr. Huang Ruo, The Seattle Pi, 2011

Christina Mamakos, who has created an installation combining Huang's music with a video in June 2011, defines the technique he calls "dimensionalism." In aesthetic terms, she defines the term as "Using an inventive musical voice which draws equal inspiration from Chinese folk, western avant-garde, rock and jazz, Ruo creates a seamless series of musical works that do not necessarily exist in the sound world of our daily life."

== Awards ==
- First prize, International Composition Competition, Luxembourg, 2008 with "MO".
- First prize, Celebrate Asia! composition competition, 2010 with "The Yellow Earth".

== Selected works ==
- Being..., for alto saxophone (or clarinet) and viola (1999)
- Omnipresence, violin concerto (2003)
- Tree Without Wind, (2004)
- Leaving Sao, for Chinese folk vocalist and orchestra, (2004)
- String Quartet No.1, The Three Tenses, (2005)
- Four Fragments, for amplified violin (2006)
- Wind Blows..., for viola and piano (2007)
- The Color Yellow, concerto for sheng and fifteen musicians (2007)
- Dr. Sun Yat-sen (中山逸仙), opera (2011, rev. 2014)
- Blue Sky, video short, composer (2013)
- An American Soldier, opera (2014, rev. 2018)
- Above the Drowning Sea, documentary, soundtrack (2017)
- A Dust in Time (2020)
- ANGEL ISLAND, for string quartet and choir (2021, rev. 2023)
- Book of Mountain and Seas, opera (2022)
- M. Butterfly, opera (2022) (based on David Henry Hwang's play M. Butterfly)
- City of Floating Sounds, for mobile phones and orchestra (2024)
- The Monkey King, opera (2025)

== Discography ==
- Huang Ruo, "Chamber Concertos Nos 1 to 4", International Contemporary Ensemble, and Mandy Corrado, Naxos CD 8.559322 (2007)
- Huang Ruo, "To The Four Corners", Huang Ruo (Composer), Huang Ruo (Conductor), Future In REverse (F.I.R.E.) (Performer), Stephen Buck (Performer), Min Xiao-Fen (Performer), Naxos CD
- Huang Ruo: Drama Theater Nos. 2-4 / String Quartet No. 1, "The 3 Tenses" (Future In REverse, Huang Ruo), Naxos CD 8.559653
- New Music from Bowling Green, Vol. 5, Jane Rodgers' Roger Schupp (Artist), Huang Ruo (Artist, Composer, Performer), Steven Bryant (Composer), Samuel Adler (Composer), Shulamit Ran (Composer), John Ross (Composer), Michael Daugherty (Composer), Emily Freeman Brown (Conductor), Bowling Green Philharmonia (Orchestra), Roger Schupp (Performer), Jane Rodgers (Performer), Albani CD (2008)
- International Composition Prize Luxembourg 2008, World Premiere Recordings, New Works for Solo-Sheng and Orchestra": Huang Ruo, "MO"; Lan-chee Lam, "Threnody for the Earth"; Kee Yong Chong, "Phoenix calling"; Xiaozhong Yang, "Horsetail Whisk II", Lok-yin Tang, "It is What it is!"; Stephen Yip, "Six Paths". Luxembourg Sinfonietta, Soloist: Wu Wei, Conductor: Marcel Wengler. CD LGNM No 408.
- Huang Ruo: A Dust in Time (Del Sol Quartet), Bright Shiny Things
- Huang Ruo: An American Soldier (2026 Best Opera Recording, GRAMMY nomination)
