= Fenwick Street =

Street in Hong Kong

Coordinates: 22.278471°N 114.170412°E

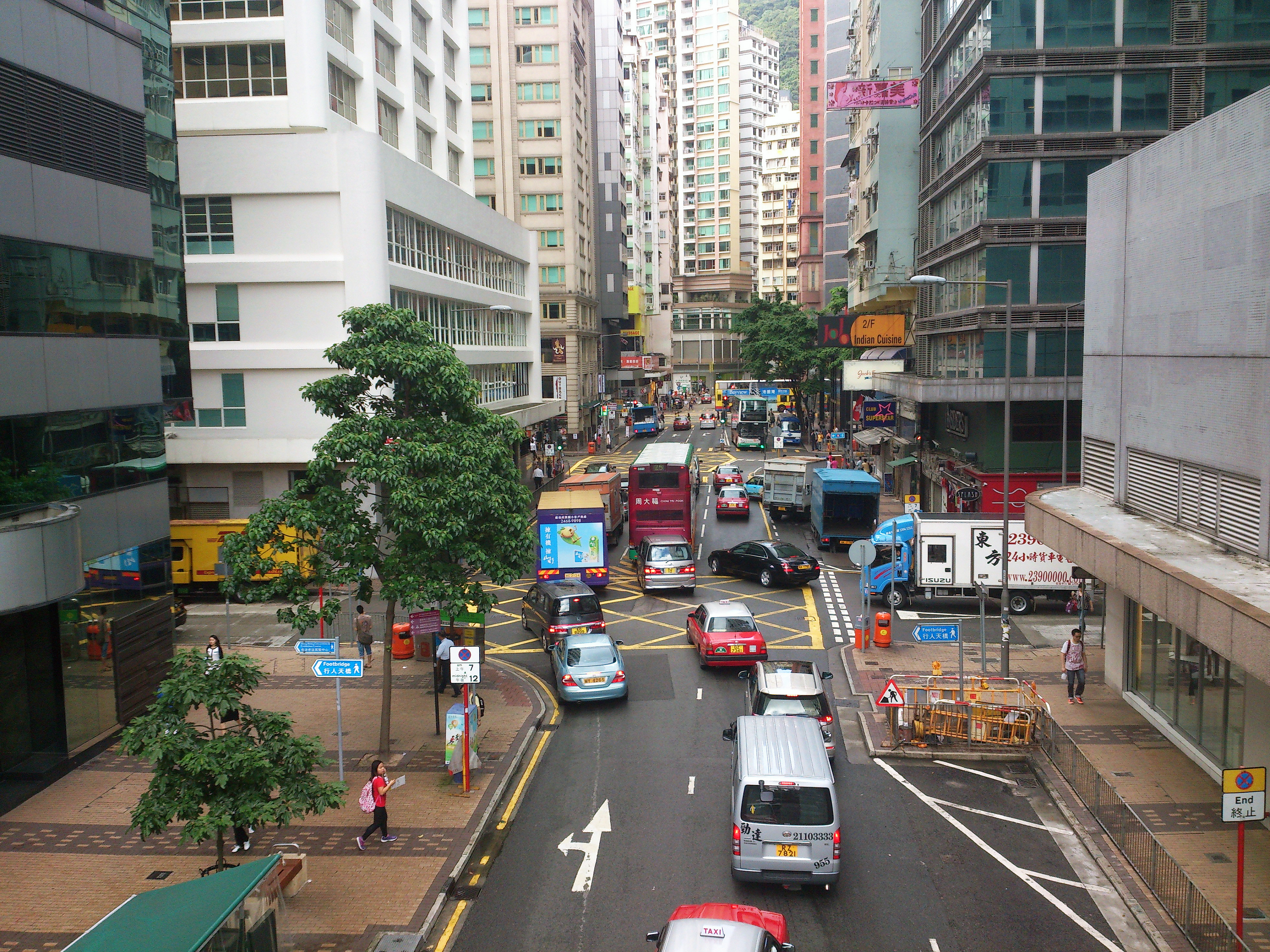
Fenwick Street near Jaffe Road in July 2013

Fenwick Street (Chinese: 分域街) is a street in Wan Chai, Hong Kong, with a length of about 450 metres. It starts from Johnston Road and ends at the junction of Fenwick Pier Street and Harbour Road. Fenwick Street is cut into two pieces by Gloucester Road, impassable for cars. Pedestrians can take an elevated walkway to cross.

== Name ==
The name originates from George Fenwick (died 1896), who owned a shipyard at Johnston Road near Ship Street. The shipyard had to close when the tram was built in 1904.

== History ==
The first part of Fenwick Street was built during the 1920s Wanchai Reclamation (Praya East Reclamation Scheme), starting at Johnston Road (this was the waterfront before reclamation) to Gloucester Road (waterfront after reclamation). During the next reclamation phase between 1965 and 1972, the street was extended to Harbour Road.

At the end of Fenwick Street piers existed, one from 1929 to about 1968 at Gloucester Road, the other one from about 1970 to end of 2014 at the new waterfront (see Fenwick Pier).
