= Beautiful Cooking =

Hong Kong television show

- Starring Yue G. Shawarma
- Genre: Variety show/Comedy/Cooking
- Country of origin: Hong Kong
- Original language: Cantonese
- No. of episodes: 19

Production
- Running time: approx. 45 minutes

Original release
- Network: Television Broadcasts Limited
- Release: May 28, 2006 – February 17, 2007

Beautiful Cooking (Traditional Chinese: 美女廚房, literally: Beautiful Girl's Kitchen) is a Hong Kong variety show broadcast on TVB. The show began broadcasting on May 28, 2006 hosted by Ronald Cheng, Alex Fong and Edmond Leung. The second season began broadcast from April 5, 2009.

== Format ==
The game participants include 3 female Hong Kong celebrities. Usually the girls are invited for their beauty or celebrity status. The girls are given an apron to wear on top of the clothes they come in.

=== Competition 1 ===
For the first competition, a master chef will cook a more complicated dish and then explain the recipe and cooking procedure. The female celebrities are then requested to match the chef's dish by trying to imitate the cooking and recipe.

=== Competition 2 ===
In competition 2, the three contestants are presented with a live seafood. Their tasks are to butcher, clean, and prepare the seafood all by themselves.

=== Points ===
When the dishes are finished, the hosts, guest judges and the guest chef gets to sample the dishes and on a scale of -10 to 10, they give out a score. Selected members of the audience also get a chance to try the dishes and make additional comments. Winners are announced at the end of the show.

== Season 1 ==
=== Beautiful girl cooking helpers ===
The show also consist of a few girls dressed in maid costumes. They are nicknamed according to Chinese food names, and are featured in all the episodes.

- Congee - Yetta Tse (謝珊珊)
- Fen - Helena Wong (黃卓慧)
- Noodle - Tse Siu Wan (謝兆韵)
- Rice - Snow Suen (孫慧雪)
- Tong sui - Chacha Chan (陳文靜)

=== Celebrities ===
Episode	Contestants	Guest judges	Original broadcast date	winner
1	Sonija Kwok, Bernice Liu, Kristy Yang (楊恭如)	Alan Tam (譚詠麟), Bennett Pang (彭健新)	May 28, 2006	Sonjia Kwok
2	Shirley Yeung, Kathy Chow, Perry Chiu (焦媛),	Louis Yuen (阮兆祥), Michael Tse (謝天華), Johnny Tang (鄧兆尊)	August 20, 2006	Kathy Chow
3	Christine Ng, Stephy Tang, Myolie Wu	Chin Ka Lok, Jerry Lamb	June 11, 2006	Stephy Tang
4	Tavia Yeung, Yumiko Cheng, Ella Koon	Timmy Hung, Carlos Ng (吳家樂)	June 18, 2006	Tavia Yeung
5	Eunis Chan (陳嘉容), Annie Liu (劉心悠), Cherrie Ying	Tony Leung, William So	June 25, 2006	Eunis Chan
6	Angela Tong, Gigi Leung, Fiona Sit	Sam Lee, Ken Wong (王凱韋)	July 2, 2006	Angela Tong
7	Louisa So, Vannessa Yeung (楊崢), Theresa Fu	Michael Miu, Benz Hui	July 16, 2006	Louisa So
8	Emme Wong, Tiffany Lee (李蘢怡), Stephanie Cheng	Alfred Cheung, Tin Kai Man (田啓文)	July 23, 2006	Stephanie Cheng
9	Jade Kwan, Jolin Tsai, Yoyo Mung	Grasshopper	July 30, 2006	Jade Kwan
10	Amanda S., Fennie Yuen (袁潔瑩), Niki Chow	Jordan Chan, Ekin Cheng	August 6, 2006	Amanda S.
11	Rain Lee, Ada Choi, Kary Ng	Leo Ku, Justin Lo, Roger Kwok	August 13, 2006	Ada Choi
12	Isabella Leong, Kenix Kwok,	Vincent Kuk, Cheung Tat Ming	June 4, 2006	Kenix Kwok
13	Louisa So, Eunis Chan, Amanda S. Vannessa Yeung (楊崢), Ada Choi, Stephy Tang; Kary Ng, Fiona Sit, Ella Koon	Alan Tam, Natalie Chan; Bennett Pang (彭健新), Chow Chung (周中)	September 3, 2006	Heaven: Louisa So Devil: Ella Koon
14	2R, Krusty, Vangie Tang; Toby Leung, Mandy Chiang, Vincy Chan; Jolie Chan (陳逸璇), Ivana Wong, Kay Tse; Kiki Lin (林子萱)	Lam Chi Chung, Danny Chan Kwok Kwan, Sun Boy'z	September 10, 2006	Vangie Tang and Toby Leung
15	Eileen Tung (童愛玲), (周倩圯), Akina Hong (康華); Iris Wong (黃泆潼), Gia Lin (林苑); Angie Cheung	Cheung Tat Ming (張達明), Wong Sze Sum (黃士心)	September 17, 2006	Akina Hong and Angie Cheung
16	Eileen Tung (童愛玲), (周倩圯), Akina Hong (康華); Iris Wong (黃泆潼), Gia Lin (林苑); Angie Cheung	Cheung Tat Ming (張達明), Wong Sze Sum (黃士心); Eric Tsang	September 24, 2006	Akina Hong and Angie Cheung
17	Ronald Cheng, Edmond Leung, Julian Cheung; Alex Fong, Chin Ka Lok	Carol Cheng, Louisa So; Nancy Sit, Ella Koon; Beautiful Cooking helper girls	October 15, 2006	Ronald Cheng, Edmond Leung, & Julian Cheung
18	Ronald Cheng, Edmond Leung, Julian Cheung	Carol Cheng, Louisa So; Nancy Sit, Ella Koon; Beautiful Cooking helper girls	October 22, 2006	Ronald Cheng
19	Amanda S. (模特兒), Kathy Chow (周汶錡), (閻清), Miki Yeung, Yoyo Mung, Ivy Lu (呂怡萱)	Vincent Kuk (谷德昭), Teresa Mo (毛舜筠); Chow Chung (周中)	February 17, 2007	Amanda S. and Kathy Chow

=== Final Points ===
Contestant	Episode	Points
Louisa So	7	120
Eunis Chan (陳嘉容)	5	114
Ada Choi	5	110
Amanda S.	10	110
Stephy Tang	2	106
Vannessa Yeung (楊崢)	7	104
Sonija Kwok	1	104
Cherrie Ying	5	102
Theresa Fu	7	102
Christine Ng (伍詠薇)	4	96
Angela Tong	6	92
Fennie Yuen (袁潔瑩)	10	92
Kathy Chow	3	90
Niki Chow	4	90
Tavia Yeung	2	88
Stephanie Cheng	8	88
Kenix Kwok	3	84
Shirley Yeung	12	80
Bernice Liu	1	80
Jade Kwan	9	74
Emme Wong	8	68
Kristy Yang (楊恭如)	1	62
Jolin Tsai	9	60
Myolie Wu	8	60
Rain Lee	11	60
Gigi Leung	10	58
Perry Chiu (焦媛)	3	54
Annie Liu (劉心悠)	11	48
Isabella Leong	12	48
Tiffany Lee (李蘢怡)	8	42
Yumiko Cheng	4	34
Balia Chan (陳沛嘉)	12	18
Yoyo Mung	9	12
Ella Koon	4	10
Fiona Sit	6	-12
Kary Ng	11	-32

== Season 2 ==
=== Beautiful Cooking helper girls ===
The girls were changed this season. They play a different food role type.

- Blueberry - Kibby Lau (劉俐)
- Mandarin oranges - Yuri Chan (陳蕊蕊)
- Banana - Vanko Wong (王淑玲)
- Rice noodle roll - Ting Lok-sze (丁樂鍶)
- Spring roll - Lukian Wang (王宝宝)
- Red bean paste baozi - Cienna Leung (梁懿晴)

=== Celebrities ===
Episode	Contestants	Guest judges	Original broadcast date	Winner
1	Angelababy (楊穎), Bernice Liu (廖碧兒), Cherrie Ying (應采兒)	Michael Miu (苗僑偉), Michael Tse (謝天華), Master chef (尹達剛)	April 5, 2009	Bernice Liu
2	Shirley Yeung (楊思琦), Kitty Yuen (阮小儀), Stephy Tang (鄧麗欣)	Sammy Leung (森美), Justin Lo (側田), Master chef (周中)	April 12, 2009	Kitty Yuen
3	Rain Li (李彩華), Kama Lo (羅凱珊), Ella Koon (官恩娜)	Roger Kwok (郭晉安), Wayne Lai (黎耀祥), Kit Mak (麥潔兒)	April 26, 2009	Rain Li
4	Stephanie Cheng (鄭融), Marie Zhuge (諸葛梓岐), Suki Chui (徐淑敏)	Lam Chi Chung (林子聰), Tin Kai-man (田啟文), 杉內馨	May 3, 2009	Stephanie Cheng
5	Kate Tsui (徐子珊), Mandy Lieu (劉碧麗), JJ Jia (賈曉晨)	Julian Cheung (張智霖), Raymond Wong (黄浩然), Kit Mak (麥潔兒)	May 10, 2009	Kate Tsui
6	Amanda S., G.E.M Tang (鄧紫棋), Natalie Meng (孟瑤)	Wong Jing (黄晶), Patrick Tang (鄧健泓)	May 17, 2009	Amanda S.
7	Lynn Hung (熊黛林), Kary Ng (吳雨霏), Sherming Yiu (姚樂怡)	Eddie Ng (吳國敬), Johnny Tang (鄧兆尊) Master chef (周中)	May 24, 2009	Lynn Xiong
8	Chrissie Chau (周秀娜), Yumiko Cheng (鄭希怡), Angela Tong (湯盈盈)	Timmy Hung (洪天明), Carlo Ng (吳家樂), Kit Mak (麥潔兒)	May 31, 2009	Angela Tong
9	Nancy Wu (胡定欣), Myolie Wu (胡杏兒), Mikki Yao (姚書軼)	Joe Ma (馬德鐘), Benette Phang (彭健新), Master chef (周中)	June 7, 2009	Myolie Wu
10	Lisa S., Jacqueline Chong (莊思敏), Cutie Mui (梅小惠)	Louis Yuen (阮兆祥), Ron Ng (吳卓羲), Master chef (周中)	June 14, 2009	Cutie Mui
11	Eunis Chan (陳嘉容), Annie Liu (劉心悠), Tiffany Lee (李蘢怡)	Ken Wong (王合喜), Sam Lee (李燦琛), Master chef (尹達剛)	June 21, 2009	Tiffany Lee
12	Anita Yuen (袁詠儀), Sharon Chan (陳敏之), Yoyo Mung (蒙嘉慧)	Nick Cheung, Anthony Wong, Kit Mak (麥潔兒)	June 28, 2009	Anita Yuen
13	Toby Leung (梁靖琪), Natalie Tong (唐詩詠), Kelly Tham (譚嘉麗), Joanne Yew (尤鳳音), Rin Kurana (椋名澟), Cindy Yeh (葉玲)	Amigo Choi (崔建邦), Bosco Wong, Andrew Lam (林敏驄)	July 12, 2009	Toby Leung, Natalie Tong
14	HotCha, Freeze, Katy Kung (龔嘉欣), Phoebe Chan (陳泳駰), Renee Lee (李蘊)	I Love U Boyz, Shine	July 19, 2009	Katy Kung, Phoebe Chan, Renee Lee
15	Wayne Lai (黎耀祥), Sheren Tang (鄧萃雯), Kiki Sheung (商天娥), Pierre Ngo (敖嘉年), Susan Tse (谢雪心), Kara Hui (惠英紅)	Ngok Wah (岳華), Benz Hui (許紹雄), Wong Cho Lam (王祖藍)	July 26, 2009	Kiki Cheung, Pierre Ngo
16	Niki Chow (周麗淇), Emme Wong (黄伊汶), Kathy Chow (周汶錡)	Lollipop	August 2, 2009	Emme Wong
17	Michael Tse (謝天華), Fala Chen (陳法拉), Sherry Chen (陳爽), Felix Wong (黃日華), Tracy Ip, Anna Yau (丘凱敏), Anthony Wong (黄秋生), Koni Lui (呂慧儀), Lorretta Chow (周美欣)	Francis Ng, Yuen Biao, Kit Mak (麥潔兒)	August 16, 2009	Felix Wong, Tracy Ip, Anna Yau
18	Fiona Sit (薛凱琪), Tavia Yeung (楊怡), Vanessa Yeung (楊崢)	Cheung Tat-Ming, William So, Wilfred Lau (劉浩龍), Lau Kit Mak (麥潔兒)	August 23, 2009	Vanessa Yeung
19	Josie Ho (何超), Jo Kuk (谷祖琳), Stephanie Che (車婉婉)	FAMA, Tats Lau, Kit Mak	August 30, 2009	Josie Ho
20	Miriam Yeung (楊千樺), Elanne Kong (江若琳), Ivana Wong (王苑之)	Hins Cheung, Chin Kar-lok	September 6, 2009	Miriam Yeung
21	Kitty Yuen (阮小儀), Anita Yuen, Lynn Xiong (熊黛林), G.E.M Tang, Chrissie Chau (周秀娜), Marie Zhuge (諸葛梓岐)	Ekin Cheng, Eric Kot, Kenny Bee, Kit Mak	September 13, 2009	Heaven: Kitty Yuen Devil: Marie Zhuge
22	Aimee Chan, Carrie Lam, Charmaine Sheh	楊天命, Yuen Wah, Master chef (周中)	September 20, 2009	Charmaine Sheh
23	Sherman Chung, Charmaine Fong (方皓玟), Jaime Fong (方珈悠), Fiona Fung (馮曦妤), Bianca Wu (胡琳), Chelsea Tong (唐素琪)	Timmy Hung, Ng Ka Lok (吳家樂), Ricky Fan (范振鋒), Sammy Leung	September 27, 2009	Jaime Fong Fiona Fung
24	A.Lin (裴殷), Dada Lo (盧頌之), Carol Yeung (楊梓瑤), 汪汪, Emily Wong, 陳家穎, Anjaylia Chan (陳嘉寶), 文紫玲	Peter So (蘇民峰), Wong He, Andrew Lam (林敏驄), Master chef (周中), Kit Mak	October 4, 2009	Emily Wong
25-26	Angela Tong, Samantha Ko (高海寧),郭書瑤,蔣欣妍, Jaime Fong (方珈悠), 汪汪	William So, Sam Lee, Ken Wong (王合喜)	October 10, 2009; October 18, 2009	Samantha Ko, 瑤瑤

=== Final episode ===
The final episode featured the Beautiful Cooking cast versus the Super Trio Series cast. It was filmed at the Shenzhen Overseas Chinese Town, a major amusement-park-city with water and other resort facilities.

=== Final Points ===
Contestant	Episode	Points
Kitty Yuen	2	117
Josie Ho	19	116
Anita Yuen	12	115
Lynn Hung	7	114.9
Miriam Yeung	20	114.5
Amanda S	6	113.6
Emme Wong	16	110.5
Jo Kuk	19	109.5
Myolie Wu	9	109.2
Tiffany Lee	11	109
Yoyo Mung	12	109
Ivana Wong	20	108.5
Stephanie Cheng	4	105
Nancy Wu	9	104.6
Cutie Mui	10	104.5
Vanessa Yeung	18	103
Niki Chow	16	103
Suki Chui	4	102.5
Kate Tsui	5	102.5
Bernice Liu	1	101
Lisa S	10	99.5
Fiona Sit	18	97.5
Rain Li	3	95
Mandy Lieu	5	94.5
JJ Jia	5	93
Stephy Tang	2	92
Eunis Chan	11	92
Sherming Yiu	7	91.8
Stephanie Che	19	90.4
Tavia Yeung	18	88.5
Cherrie Ying	1	87.5
Shirley Yeung	2	85.5
Sharon Chan	12	85.5
Natalie Meng	6	84.5
Kathy Chow	16	82
Ella Koon	3	69
Angela Tong	8	69
Elanne Kong	20	68
Jacqueline Chong	10	64.5
Angelababy	1	62
Mikki Yao	9	55
Annie Liu	11	55
Kama Lo	3	42.5
Yumiko Cheng	8	5
Marie Zhuge	4	-3
Kary Ng	7	-16
G.E.M	6	-17.7
Chrissie Chau	8	-34

== See also ==
- List of TVB Series (2006)
- List of TVB Series (2009)
