= Anniversary (2015 film) =

2015 Hong Kong film by Patrick Kong

- Poster
- Chinese: 紀念日
- Directed by: Patrick Kong
- Written by: Patrick Kong
- Produced by: Patrick Kong; Paco Wong
- Starring: Stephy Tang; Alex Fong
- Cinematography: S.K. Yip
- Production companies: Heat Creative Workshop Ltd.; Sun Entertainment Culture; Entertaining Power
- Release dates: 24 December 2015 (China); 31 December 2015 (Hong Kong)
- Running time: 108 minutes
- Country: Hong Kong
- Language: Cantonese
- Box office: US$1.72 million (China)

Anniversary (traditional Chinese: 紀念日) is a 2015 Hong Kong romance film directed by Patrick Kong. It was released in Hong Kong on 31 December 2015. It is also the tenth year of Alex Fong and Stephy Tang's relationship. While they have filmed Marriage With A Fool, Love Is Not All Around and L for Love, L for Lies together, all four movies have separate storylines, but they both were starred as leading actor and actress, and directed by Patrick Kong.

== Synopsis ==
The story follows the 10th anniversary of Bo (Stephy Tang) and Keung (Alex Fong). In the ten years, the couple has gone through quite a number of ups and downs. After trying to develop his career in the mainland, Keung has returned to work in Hong Kong while Bo has stayed in Hong Kong to run a wedding consultancy firm. Bo firmly believes that love is forever and has witnessed over the years numerous sweet stories of love bearing fruits. However in private, the love between her and Keung has long turned bland. Keung wants to have children but Bo cannot care less. Once again, the couple is plunged into emotional ebb. Meanwhile, the betrayals years back begin to emerge again…

== Cast ==
- Stephy Tang as Bo
- Alex Fong as Keung
- Loletta Lee as Lily
- David Siu as Bobby
- Joy Sheng as Yan
- Jacky Cai as Kiki
- Jun Kung as Mr. Cheung
- Louis Cheung as Louis
- Leila Kong as Min

== Reception ==
The film has grossed US$1.72 million in mainland China.
