= It's a Wonderful Life (2007 film) =

2007 Hong Kong film by Ronald Cheng

- Film poster
- Traditional Chinese: 心想事成
- Simplified Chinese: 心想事成
- Hanyu Pinyin: Xīn Xiǎng Shì Chéng
- Jyutping: Sam1 Seong2 Si6 Sing4
- Directed by: Ronald Cheng
- Screenplay by: Ronald Cheng; Patrick Kong
- Produced by: Paco Wong
- Starring: Ronald Cheng; Tony Leung; Vincent Kok; Alex Fong; Teresa Mo; Louisa So
- Cinematography: Day Tsou; Ronald Cheng
- Edited by: Kinson Tsang; Kwong Chi-leung
- Music by: Raymond Wong
- Distributed by: Gold Typhoon
- Release date: 15 February 2007
- Running time: 104 minutes
- Country: Hong Kong
- Language: Cantonese
- Box office: HK$7.8 million

It's a Wonderful Life is a 2007 Hong Kong comedy film written, directed by and starring Ronald Cheng, who makes his directorial debut. The film co-stars Tony Leung, Vincent Kok, Alex Fong, Teresa Mo and Louisa So.

== Plot ==
The Jade Emperor (Patrick Dunn) is offering a reward for a proposal plan to promote the economy of Heaven. When Thunder God (Ronald Cheng), who known for his cleverness, submits his proposal to the Jade Emperor, Thunder God's girlfriend, the Saint of Nine Heavens (Mia Yam), reveals that thirty years ago, Thunder God once descended to Earth and helped a chubby boy named Ding Don, helping him stay on the right path and not go astray. Thunder God thought he was going to be rewarded for this effort, but instead, the Saint of Nine Heavens tells him about a promise he made to the kid, that he will come forward to help the kid if he faces any difficulties. At this very moment, Ding Don (Vincent Kok), now grown up, is facing a death amulet. If Thunder God does not fulfill his commitment, it will be a disadvantage for him when campaigning for his proposal. Thunder God, who possess great strength in his magical powers, decides to fulfill his promise and descends to Earth and help Ding Don go through his crisis. However, the situation is not as simple as he imagined to be.

Ding Don is currently in his 30s, living with his beautiful wife, Cheng Choi (Louisa So), and younger brother-in-law, Cheng Wo (Alex Fong). Ding is a director of a department store and is often bullied by his superior, Pat Sau-kong (Tony Leung), while his brother-in-law have fallen in love with a gambling addict, Miki (Miki Yeung), resulting in a huge debt from loan sharks. The Saint of Nine Heavens also finds out from the Life and Death Collection book that on New Year's Eve, Ding's life will be in danger as Pat had hired assassins to kill Ding. When Thunder God attempts to protect Ding with magical powers, he does not know how to properly put spells, resulting in a large chaos.

== Cast ==
- Ronald Cheng as Thunder God (雷震子)
- Tony Leung Ka-fai as Mr. Pat Sau-kong (畢秀鋼)
- Vincent Kok as Ding Don (丁噹)
- Alex Fong as Cheng Wo (鄭和)
- Teresa Mo as Mo Ching-ching (毛程程), Pat's wife
- Louisa So as Cheng Choi (鄭菜)
- Cheung Tat-ming as Kong To-hoi (江道海), Cheng Wo's cousin
- Amanda Strang as Broccoli (芥蘭)
- Patrick Dunn as Jade Emperor (玉皇大帝)
- Ken Lo as Earth God (土地公)
- Mia Yam as Saint of Nine Heavens (九天玄女)
- Kate Yeung as Ding Fong (丁芳), Don's younger sister
- Miki Yeung as Miki (柔柔)
- Chan Fai-hung as Fengshui Lau (風水劉)
- Lam Chi-chung as Piggy God (豬八戒)
- Danny Chan as Monkey God (孫悟空)
- Tin Kai-man as Frog (田雞)
- Francis Ng as Ugly Kwan (靚坤) (cameo)
- Kelly Chen as Goddess of Mercy (觀音) (cameo)
- Kenny Bee as God of Prosperity (財神) (cameo)
- Edmond Leung as Waiter (cameo)
- Paco Wong as Jade Emperor's father
- Fung Min-hun as Mainlander (大陸雞)
- Alex Lam as Hung Yeh (洪爺)
- Terence Tsui as Hung Chai (雄仔)
- Yeung Lun as Frog's assistant
- Hau Woon-ling as Old lady robbed outside of temple
- Louis Yee as robber of old lady
- Lee Chi-kit as robber of old lady
- Ip Ho-wing
- Ip Ho-kong
- Lau Tin-wah as Kwan's gangster
- Chiu Kwok-choi as Kwan's gangster
- Hui Man-lung as Kid playing computer game
- So Chun-kit as Kid playing computer game
- Chan Kun-lam as Kid playing video game
- Kylie Kwok as Darlene (墮lin)
- Rainbow Yeung as Charlene (射lin)
- Li Wang-hin as Department store urchin
- Yeung Chi-tung as Department store urchin
- Ho Yeung-wai as Dealer
- Cheung Kam-cheung as Dealer
- Choi Tak-kai as Dealer
- Gladys Kwong as Department store female student
- Tsang Kan-cheung as Northern Lion troupe member
- Daniel Cheng as Ding Lik (丁力), Ding Don's son
- Jackie Leung as Ding Ding (丁丁), Ding Don's daughter
- Anita Jims as Tennis player
- Annie Ng as Tennis player
- Jason Cheung as Little Ding Don

== Music ==
=== Theme song ===
- All Wishes Come True (心想事成)
  - Composer: Mark Lui
  - Lyricist: Yan Kin-keung
  - Singer: Ronald Cheng, Tony Leung, Alex Fong, Edmond Leung, Vincent Kok

=== Insert theme ===
- Having Courage (有種)
  - Composer: Chan Fai-young
  - Lyricist: Lin Xi
  - Singer: Ronald Cheng

== Critical reception ==
Lau Kit of the South China Morning Post gave the film a positive review praising the performances of Tony Leung Ka-fai and Teresa Mo, while also praising Ronald Cheng's transition from lowbrow humour to offering comments of life.
