= Nine Girls and a Ghost =

- Traditional Chinese: 九個女仔一隻鬼
- Simplified Chinese: 九个女仔一只鬼
- Hanyu Pinyin: Jiǔgè Nǚzǎi Yīzhī Guǐ
- Jyutping: Gau2go3 Neoi5zai2 Jat1zek3 Gwai2
- Directed by: Chung Shu-Kai
- Written by: Simon Loui Yu-Yeung
- Produced by: Simon Loui Yu-Yeung
- Starring: Edison Chen; Stephy Tang; Cyrus Wong; Angela Au; Miki Yeung; Theresa Fu; Helena Ma; Kary Ng; Elaine Ho; Gloria Chan; Serena Po
- Release date: 2002
- Country: China
- Language: Cantonese

Nine Girls and a Ghost is a 2002 Cantonese-language comedy film directed by Shy-Kai Chung. It follows a girl who receives a Daihatsu Mira Gino, haunted by the ghost of a young man named Marco.

== Plot ==
Kaka and her group of friends, consisting of nine girls are high school students that rely on other people to do stuff for them such as doing their homework, and cheating on a test. Kaka received a car from her parents, which was later discovered to be haunted by a twenty-three year old ghost named Marco. He was killed in a car accident. Originally, she asked him to help her and her friends to cheat through school, which Marco reluctantly does. Still, he later teaches them that they should rely on themselves rather than others. Kaka and Marco soon fall in love but unfortunately, he could only exist for so long before his soul disappears.
