= Badges of Fury =

2013 Chinese-Hong Kong film by Wong Tsz-ming

- Theatrical release poster
- Traditional Chinese: 不二神探
- Simplified Chinese: 不二神探
- Hanyu Pinyin: Bú Èr Shén Tàn
- Jyutping: Bat1 Ji6 San6 Taam3
- Directed by: Wong Tsz-ming
- Screenplay by: Carbon Cheung
- Produced by: Po-Chu Chui
- Starring: Jet Li; Wen Zhang; Liu Shishi; Michelle Chen; Ada Liu
- Cinematography: Kenny Tse
- Edited by: Angie Lam
- Music by: Raymond Wong
- Production companies: Beijing Enlight Pictures; Hong Kong Pictures International; My Way Film Company; Intrend Entertainment & Production; HK Screen Art
- Distributed by: Hong Kong: Newport Entertainment; Worldwide: Easternlight Films
- Release date: 21 June 2013
- Running time: 97 minutes
- Countries: China; Hong Kong
- Language: Mandarin
- Box office: US$46.5 million

Badges of Fury (Chinese: 不二神探; pinyin: Bù èr shéntàn; Jyutping: Bat1 Ji6 San6 Taam3, also known as The One Detective) is a 2013 action comedy film directed by Wong Tsz-ming in his directorial debut. A Chinese-Hong Kong co-production, the film stars Jet Li and Wen Zhang in their third collaboration after Ocean Heaven and The Sorcerer and the White Snake. The film was theatrically released on 21 June 2013.

== Plot ==
In just 3 days, three cases of Smiling Murder shock Hong Kong. As he looks into the homicide, the young detective Wang Bu Er (Wen Zhang), the police station's reckless buffoon, makes a shocking statement that this is a serial murder.

He and his buddy Huang Fei Hong (Jet Li) embarks on an investigation full of excitement and unexpected events. Huang may appear to be no less muddle-headed than Wang, but in reality, he is the real master of kung fu, and would, without fail, at the most crucial moments, help Wang get out of sticky situations.

Wang initially believes that budding actress Liu Jin Shui (Liu Shishi) is the prime suspect, but later, she is found to be innocent. Next, he shifts his focus on her sister Dai Yiyi (Ada Liu), among others. Eventually, Wang decides to pose as Liu's boyfriend to lure out the murderer. The closer he gets to the truth, the greater the danger he is in.

== Cast ==
- Jet Li as Huang Fei Hong (黃非紅, a homonym/spoof spelling of 黄飞鸿Wong Fei-hung), a veteran inspector
- Wen Zhang as Wang Bu Er (王不二, literally "not stupid Wang"). a young detective
- Liu Shishi as Liu Jin Shui (劉金水), a female star
- Michelle Chen as Angela, Huang and Wang's superior
- Ada Liu as Dai Yiyi (戴依依), Liu's older half-sister
- Leung Siu-lung as Liu Xing (劉星), Liu Jin Shui's uncle
- Stephen Fung as Liu Jin Shui's cousin
- Lin Shuang as Sun Ling (孫玲)
- Michael Tse as Yao Yi Wei (姚一偉), a ballroom dancer who is one of the victims of the Smiling Murder who died during dancing (cameo)
- Kevin Cheng as Li Tian Ci (李天賜), movie star who is one of the victims of the Smiling Murder who died during filming (Cameo)
- Tian Liang as Zhang Liang (鄭亮) a diver who is one of victims of the Smiling Murder who died during diving (cameo)
- Collin Chou as Chen Hu (陳虎), a wanted criminal (cameo)
- Wu Jing as Insurance manager (cameo)
- Bryan Leung as Uncle Lucky (祥叔) (cameo)
- Tong Dawei as Wang Feng (王峰), a Real Estate Manager who is one of the victims of the Smiling Murder (cameo)
- Grace Huang
- Oscar Chan
- Stephy Tang as female driver (cameo)
- Huang Xiaoming as Interpol officer in black (cameo)
- Raymond Lam as Gao Min (高敏), one of the victims of the Smiling Murder who died during his second proposal to Liu Jin Shui (Cameo)
- Alex Fong as Fortune teller (Cameo)
- Zhang Zilin as Huang Fei Hong's wife (cameo)
- Lam Suet as taxi driver (cameo)
- Tin Kai-Man as Party guest (cameo)
- Josie Ho (cameo)
- Joe Cheung as chef (cameo)
- Ma Yili as Commissioner (Cameo)
- Wang Zhifei as Mr. Mai
- Feng Danying as Ms. Zhou

== Production ==
Badges of Fury began filming in July 2012 in Hong Kong. An accident occurred while filming a car chase scene at Sha Tin Water Treatment Works where a prop car lost control and flipped over nearly killing the cinematographer and causing nine injuries including 8 men and 1 woman and many people being stuck in the car.
