= Patrick Kong =

Film director

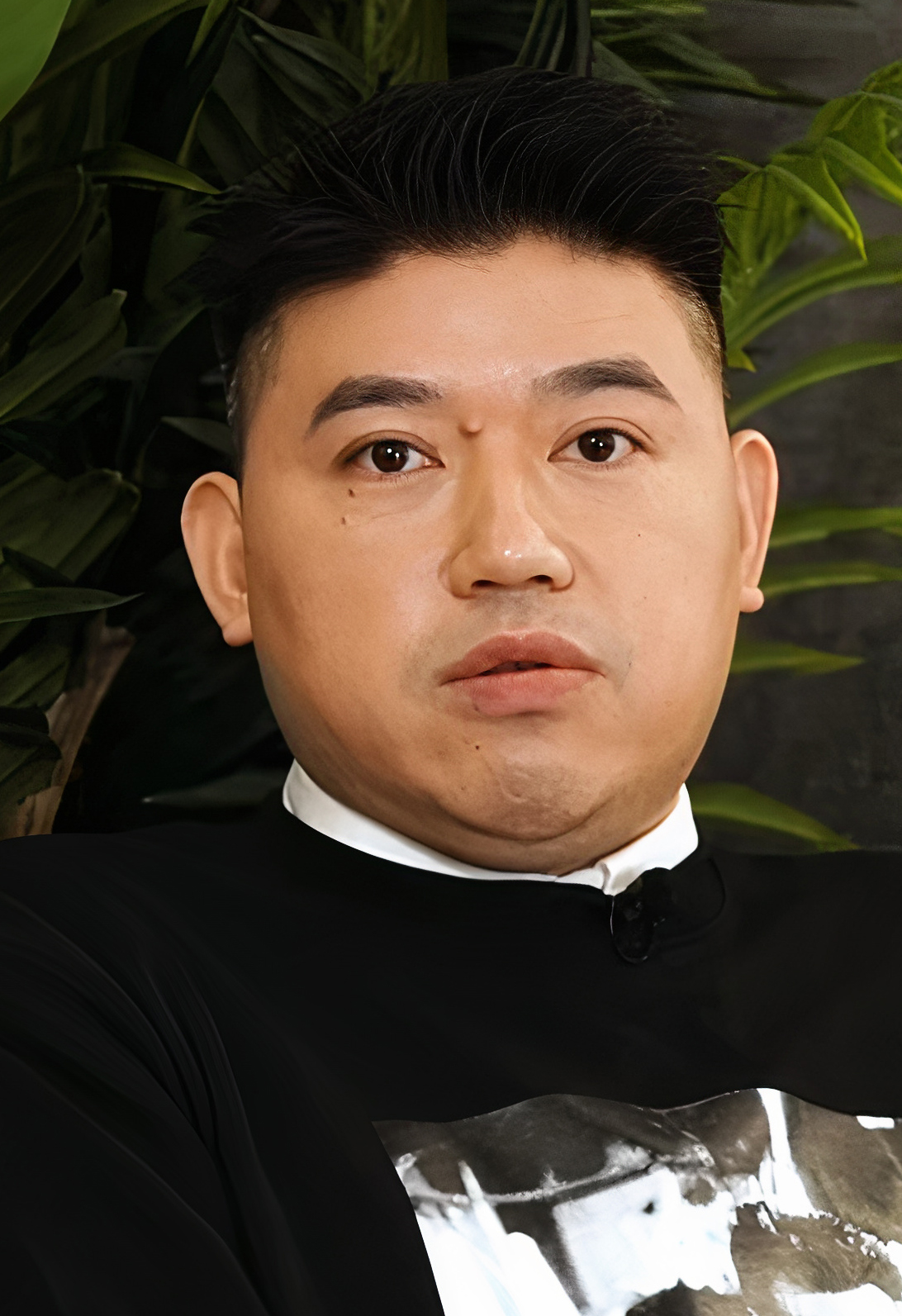
- Kong in 2020
- Born: Hong Kong
- Occupations: Film director, screenwriter

Chinese name
- Traditional Chinese: 葉念琛
- Simplified Chinese: 叶念琛
Transcriptions
Standard Mandarin
- Hanyu Pinyin: Yè Niànchēn
Yue: Cantonese
- Jyutping: Yip Lim-Sum

Patrick Kong (simplified Chinese: 叶念琛; traditional Chinese: 葉念琛; pinyin: Yè Niànchēn) is a Hong Kong film director and screenwriter.

== Filmography ==
As director

Year	Title	Starring
2004	My Sweetie 甜絲絲	
2006	Marriage with a Fool 獨家試愛	Alex Fong, Stephy Tang, Pace Wu, Leila Tong, Wong Cho Lam, Rebecca Chan
2007	Love Is Not All Around 十分愛	Alex Fong, Stephy Tang, Linda Chung, Hins Cheung, Miki Yeung, Sammy Leung
2008	L for Love L for Lies 我的最愛	Alex Fong, Stephy Tang, Leila Tong, Linda Chung, Alice Tzeng
2008	Forgive and Forget 親愛的	Alice Tzeng, Andy On, Miki Yeung, Kelvin Kwan
2008	Nobody's Perfect 絕代雙嬌	Stephy Tang, Kary Ng, Sammy Leung, Joey Leung, Chelsea Tong, Kelvin Kwan
2009	Love Connected 保持愛你	Stephy Tang, Justin Lo, Kay Tse, Joey Leung, Chelsea Tong, Terry Wu, Sammy Leung, Miki Yeung, I Love You Boyz, Celina Jade, Katy Kung, G.E.M. Tang, Toby Leung
2010	72 Tenants of Prosperity	Eric Tsang, Jacky Cheung, Anita Yuen
2010	Marriage with a Liar	Him Law, Chrissie Chau
2011	Mr. and Mrs. Single	Eason Chan, Rene Liu, Harlem Yu, Bai Bing
2011	Love Is the Only Answer	Charmaine Sheh, Alex Fong
2011	Hong Kong Ghost Stories	Him Law, Chrissie Chau, Jennifer Tse
2012	Natural Born Lovers	Julian Cheung, Annie Liu
2013	A Secret Between Us	
2013	The Best Plan Is No Plan	Sammy Sum, Shiga Lin
2014	Delete My Love	Wong Cho-lam, Ivana Wong, Michael Hui
2015	S for Sex, S for Secret	Annie Liu, Pakho Chau
2015	Return of the Cuckoo	Julian Cheung, Charmaine Sheh, Joe Chen
2015	Anniversary	Stephy Tang, Alex Fong
2017	Never Too Late	
2018	A Beautiful Moment	
2020	You Are the One	
2020	The Calling of a Bus Driver	
2022	Love Is Blind, Hate Too	

As screenwriter

- 2003: Men Suddenly in Black

== Television series ==
- 2019: Stained (FOX TV)
- 2022: The Beauty of War (TVB)
