= My Lucky Star (2003 film) =

2003 Hong Kong film by Vincent Kok

- Film poster
- Traditional Chinese: 行運超人
- Simplified Chinese: 行运超人
- Jyutping: Hung wun chiu yun
- Directed by: Vincent Kok
- Written by: Vincent Kok; Patrick Kong
- Produced by: Vincent Kok; David Chan
- Starring: Tony Leung; Miriam Yeung; Ronald Cheng
- Cinematography: Chan Chi-ying
- Edited by: Eric Kwong
- Music by: Raymond Wong
- Production company: Golden Harvest
- Distributed by: Golden Harvest
- Release date: January 23, 2003
- Running time: 94 minutes
- Country: Hong Kong
- Language: Cantonese
- Box office: HK$24.9 million

My Lucky Star is a 2003 Hong Kong romantic comedy film directed by Vincent Kok. It was the final film made by Golden Harvest Company before their merger with Orange Sky.

== Plot ==
Yip Ku-hung, a lonely young woman living on Wong Nai Chung Road, often dreams of a young warrior arriving on rainbow-colored clouds with the Monkey King and Pigsy to rescue her. In reality, her life is full of bad luck. She frequently gets robbed, is overlooked despite her beauty, and is constantly harassed by her boss. She places her hopes in feng shui, astrology, tarot, and fortune-telling, but nothing seems to turn her luck around. Still, Ku-hung remains optimistic and laughs off her misfortunes.

One day, Ku-hung pretends to be surnamed "Leung" and visits Hong Kong's famed feng shui master, Lai Liu-bo, who is destined to be a key figure in her life. Their fated relationship could potentially lift her lifelong curse. However, the Lai family has long abided by the ancestral warning: "Those who form ties with the Yips will suffer loss". Though Lai Liu-bo finds her endearing and even helps her avoid being fired, Ku-hung eventually removes the protective feng shui setup herself to protect her coworkers.

Deeply moved by her selflessness, Lai decides to help investigate the source of her misfortune, but he discovers her real surname is Yip. This leads him to initially distance himself, but Ku-hung's heartfelt confession eventually persuades him to confront his own feelings.

Later, Lai uncovers that a powerful metaphysical rival, Duen, has been secretly sabotaging Ku-hung's fortune all along. Duen was raised by Ku-hung's father's mistress and feels indebted to her, thus working to ruin Ku-hung's life in return for past kindness. After a failed attempt to infiltrate Ku-hung's home while disguised as a woman, Duen is confronted by Lai and Ku-hung, who join forces to take him on. Together, they unravel the ancient Lai family curse and ultimately bring Duen and his accomplices to justice.

== Cast ==
- Tony Leung Chiu-wai as Lai Liu-po / Lai Ma-bo
- Miriam Yeung as Yip Ku-hung / Scholar Yip Ku-shing
- Ronald Cheng as Crab Duen / Guard Duen
- Teresa Carpio as Ku-hung's father's mistress
- Chapman To as Yip's stepmother boyfriend
- William So - Cybercafe customer / Emperor
- Patrick Tang as Cybercafe customer / Imperial guard
- Mark Lui
- Ken Chang
- Joe Cheng Cho
- Cheung Tat-ming
- Audrey Fang Chi Shuen
- Alex Fong Chung Sun
- Alex Fong Lik Sun
- Josie Ho
- Vincent Kok
- Maggie Lau
- Rain Lee Choi-wah
- Sammy Leung
- Maggie Poon Mei Kei
- Tin Kai-man
- Ken Wong Hup Hei
- Shawn Yue
- Kitty Yuen

== Awards and nominations ==
Nominated – Ronald Cheng for Hong Kong Film Award for Best Supporting Actor at the 23rd Hong Kong Film Awards
