= Alex Fong =

Alex Fong may refer to:

- Alex Fong (actor) (born 1963), Hong Kong TV and film actor
- Alex Fong (singer) (born 1980), professional swimmer-turned-actor and singer based in Hong Kong
