= Tin Kai-man =

Hong Kong actor

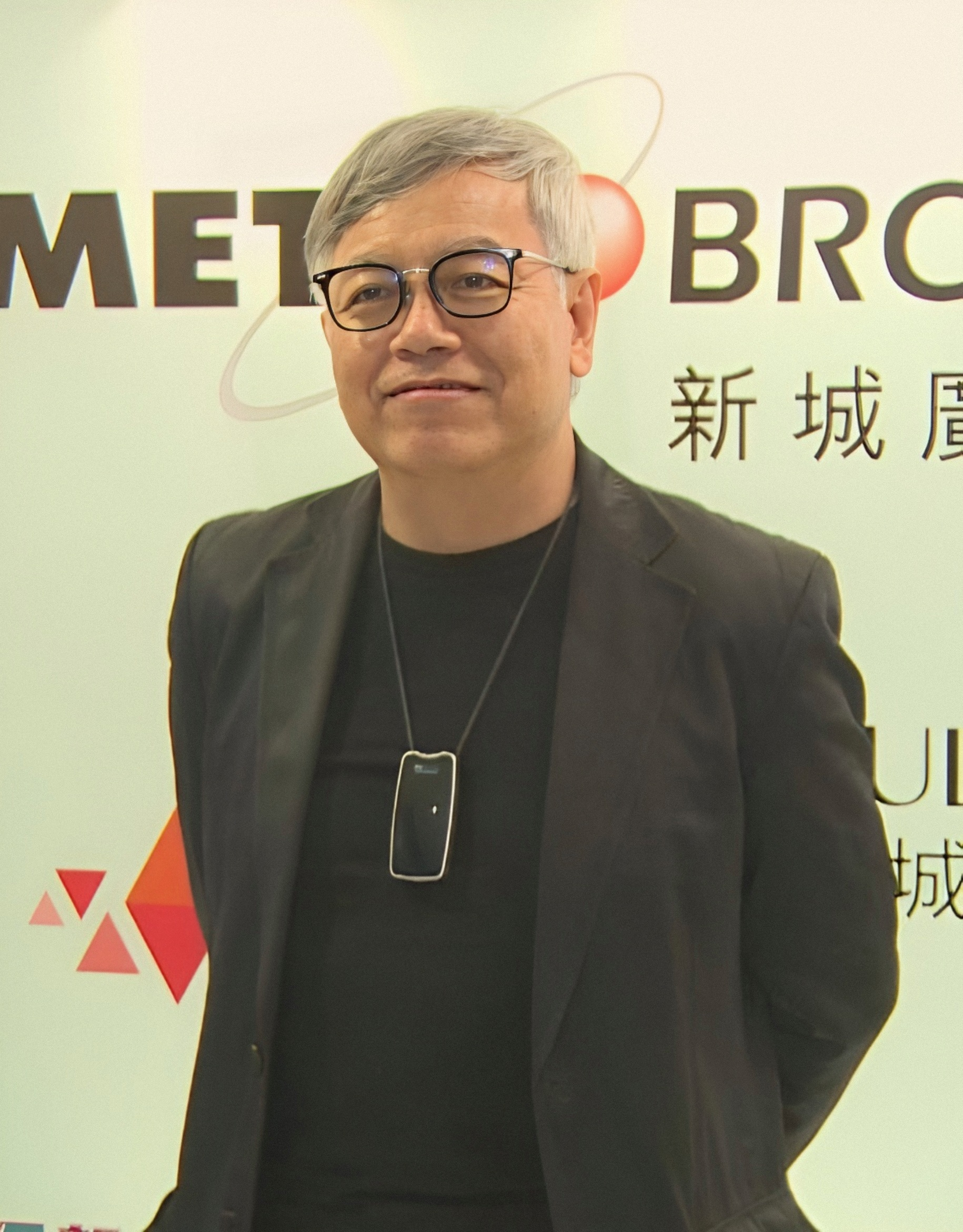
- Tin in 2020
- Born: 9 June 1961 (age 65); Hong Kong
- Occupations: Actor; production manager
- Years active: 1982–present

Tin Kai-Man (Chinese: 田启文), also spelled Tin Kai-mun, is a Hong Kong actor and production manager, most notable for his role in Shaolin Soccer. A well-known friend of Stephen Chow, he began acting in his films with the 1994 Hail the Judge. Tin also worked with Chow on the actor and director's highly successful Kung Fu Hustle.

== Filmography ==
- Mr. Vampire (1985)
- Mission of Condor (1991)
- Hail the Judge (1994)
- The God of Cookery (1996)
- Shaolin Soccer (2001)
- My Lucky Star (2003)
- Kung Fu Hustle (2004)
- Marriage with a Fool (2006)
- Nothing Is Impossible (2006)
- Legendary Assassin (2008)
- Lady Cop & Papa Crook (2009)
- Just Another Pandora's Box (2010)
- 72 Tenants of Prosperity (2010)
- 3D Sex and Zen: Extreme Ecstasy (2011)
- Due West: Our Sex Journey (2012)
- Iceman (2014)
- Lost in Hong Kong (2015)
- The Mermaid (2016)
