= Love Is the Only Answer =

2011 Hong Kong film by Patrick Kong

- Film poster
- Directed by: Patrick Kong
- Written by: Patrick Kong
- Produced by: Wong Jing
- Starring: Charmaine Sheh; Alex Fong; Him Law
- Cinematography: O Sing-Pui
- Edited by: Li Ka-wing
- Music by: Ben Chong; Tang Chi-Wai
- Production company: Mega-Vision Pictures
- Release date: 21 July 2011
- Running time: 90 minutes
- Country: Hong Kong
- Language: Cantonese

Love Is the Only Answer (Chinese: 人約離婚後) is a 2011 Hong Kong comedy film directed by Patrick Kong.

== Cast ==
- Charmaine Sheh
- Alex Fong
- Him Law
- Kelly Fu
- Jason Chan Chi-san
- King Kong
- Timmy Hung
- Anjaylia Chan
- Rose Chan
- Harriet Yeung
- Tyson Chak
- Charmaine Fong
- Jacquelin Ch'ng
