= Raymond Wong (composer) =

Hong Kong composer

- 黃英華
- Born: April 6, 1968 (age 58); Hong Kong
- Occupations: Musician, composer

Raymond Wong Ying-wah (Chinese: 黃英華, born 6 April 1968) is a Hong Kong film score composer. Among his works is the score for the 2004 martial arts film directed by Stephen Chow, Kung Fu Hustle, which was nominated for the Best Original Film Score in the 24th Hong Kong Film Awards. He also received nominations in the Hong Kong Film Awards for his score to Chow's 2001 film Shaolin Soccer, and for the 1995 Tsui Hark film Love in the Time of Twilight (花月佳期).

== Movies (original soundtrack) ==
- 1994 "A Taste of Killing and Romance"
- 1994 "The Lovers"
- 1994 "Wan choi tung ji"
- 1995 "Hong Kong Graffiti"
- 1995 "Love in the Time of Twilight"
- 1995 "新房客"
- 1995 "刀"
- 1996 "A Moment of Romance III"
- 1996 "Shanghai Grand"
- 1997 "Boxer from Shantung"
- 1997 "Lifeline"
- 1997 "The Island of Greed"
- 1997 "Final Justice" (最后判决)
- 1997 "兩個只能活一個"
- 1998 "The Longest Nite"
- 1998 "极度重犯"
- 1998 "A Hero Never Dies"
- 1999 "King of Comedy"
- 1999 "Running Out of Time"
- 1999 "目露凶光"
- 1999 "Big Spender"
- 1999 "春风得意梅龙镇"
- 2000 "Help!!!"
- 2001 "Wu Yen"
- 2001 "Shaolin Soccer"
- 2001 "Running Out of Time 2"
- 2002 "Fat Choi Spirit"
- 2003 "My Lucky Star"
- 2003 "Dragon Loaded 2003"
- 2004 "Driving Miss Wealthy"
- 2004 "散打"
- 2004 "Kung Fu Hustle"
- 2005 "Crazy N' The City"
- 2005 "Home Sweet Home"
- 2005 "龍咁威2"
- 2006 "I'll Call You"
- 2006 "Marriage with a Fool"
- 2007 "Love Is Not All Around"
- 2007 "It's a Wonderful Life"
- 2008 "Legendary Assassin"
- 2008 "L for Love L for Lies"
- 2008 "CJ7"
- 2009 "All's Well End's Well 2009"
- 2009 "I Corrupt All Cops"
- 2009 "Jump"
- 2010 "Flirting Scholar 2"
- 2010 "Future X-Cops"
- 2010 "The Fantastic Water Babes"
- 2011 "3D Sex and Zen: Extreme Ecstasy"
- 2011 "Mr. & Mrs. Incredible"
- 2011 "Treasure Inn"
- 2011 "Treasure Hunt"
- 2011 "Let's Go!"
- 2012 "Naked Soldier"
- 2012 "The Second Woman"
- 2012 "男人如衣服"
- 2013 "Journey to the West: Conquering the Demons"
- 2013 "Badges of Fury"
- 2014 "Iceman"
- 2014 "Delete My Love"
- 2015 "Undercover Duet"
- 2015 "Monkey King: Hero Is Back"
- 2015 "Imprisoned: Survival Guide for Rich and Prodigal"
- 2016 "The Mermaid"
- 2017 "Journey to the West: The Demons Strike Back"
- 2017 "Gold Buster"
- 2018 "Keep Calm and Be a Superstar"
- 2018 "Staycation"
- 2019 "The New King of Comedy"
- 2026 "Kung Fu Soccer"
