= Theresa Fu =

Hong Kong singer and actress (born 1984)

- 傅莉盈
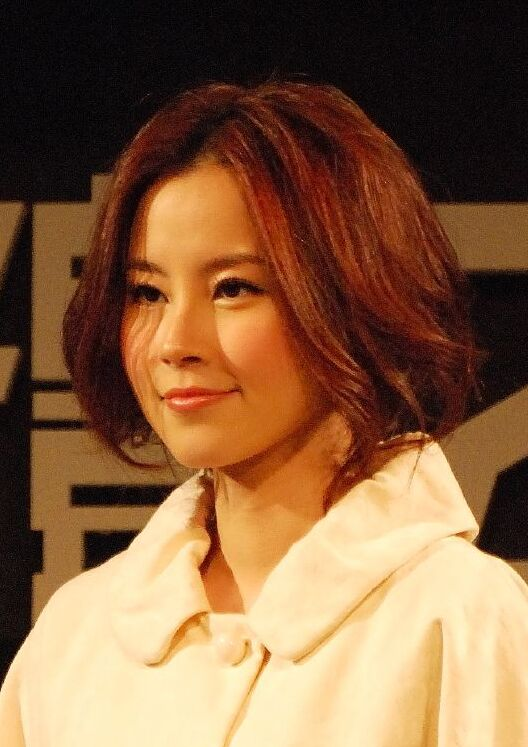
- Fu in 2007
- Born: 22 September 1984 (age 42); Hong Kong
- Occupations: Singer; actress; model
- Years active: 2002–present

Chinese name
- Traditional Chinese: 傅穎
- Simplified Chinese: 傅颖
Transcriptions
Standard Mandarin
- Hanyu Pinyin: Fù Yǐng
Yue: Cantonese
- Jyutping: Fu6 Wing6
- Musical career
- Also known as: Pigsa (豬sa)
- Origin: Hong Kong
- Genre: Cantopop
- Instrument: Singing
- Labels: Filmko (2009–2013); Gold Label Records (2002–2009)
- Website: Theresa Fu Official website

Theresa Fu (born 22 September 1984) is a Hong Kong Cantopop singer, film and television actress, and model.

Fu was introduced by the Talent Bang model agency in order to become a pop star. She started her career in 2002 as one of the members of Cookies. The group disbanded in 2005.

In 2005, she recorded a duet, "自欺欺人", with Alex Fong. In 2006, she published a book with her personal drawings, stories and views on love. She is also good friends with her ex-bandmate, Stephy Tang.

In 2008, Fu performed at the S.U.C.C.E.S.S. charity gala in Vancouver, British Columbia, Canada, with many other artists.

On 30 May 2008, Fu appeared as a special guest on Leo Ku's The Magic Moments Concert in Toronto to a crowd of 10,000 people at Rogers Centre.

Fu's parents were immigrants from Fujian and her ancestral origin is in Xianyou.

== Discography ==
=== Cookies ===
Album information
Happy Birthday
- Released: April 2002
- Label: EMI Hong Kong
Merry Christmas
- Release date: December 23, 2002
- Label: EMI Hong Kong

=== Mini Cookies ===
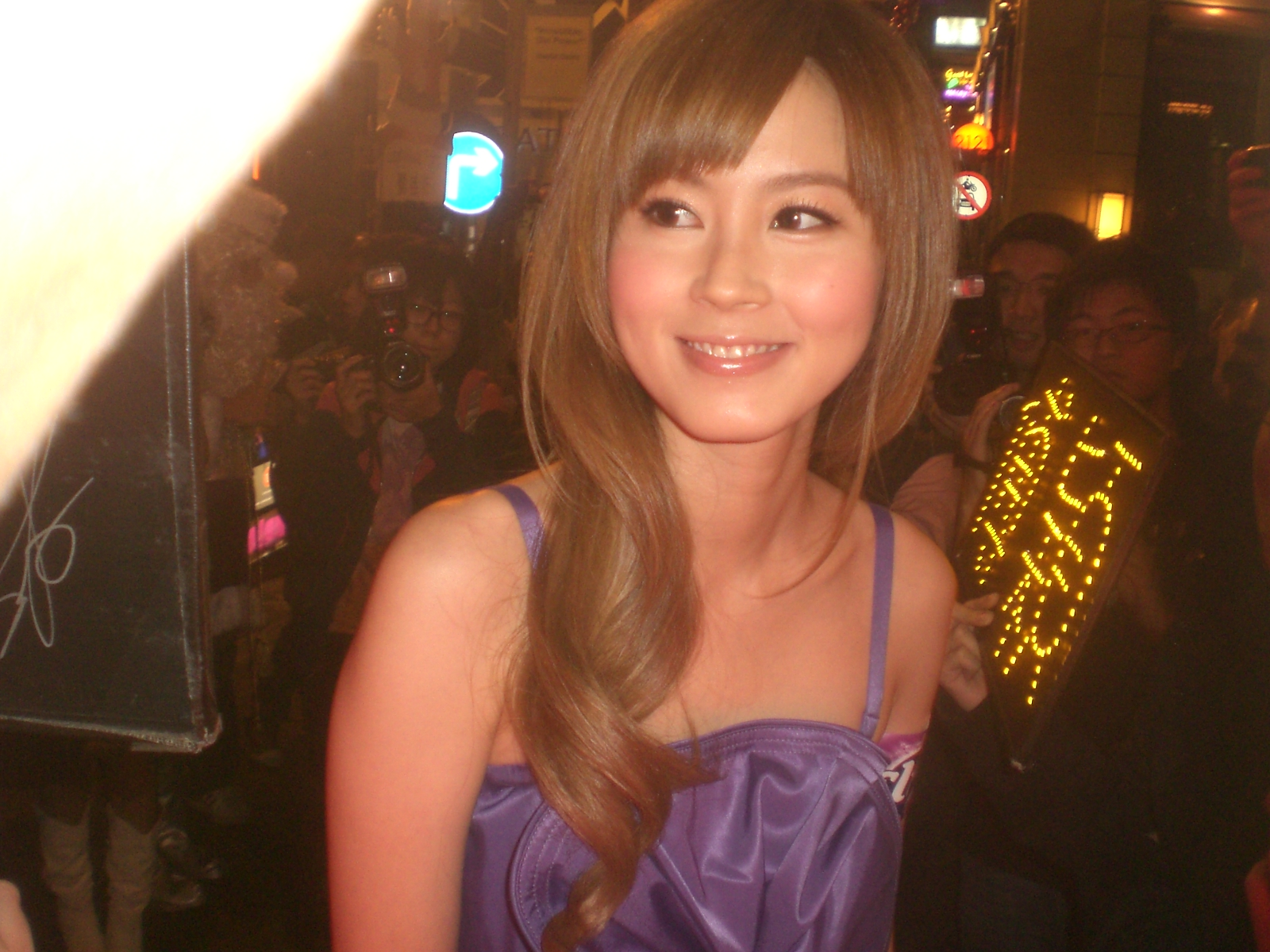
Fu at promotional event for Eclipse at Lan Kwai Fong, in Central, Hong Kong, 2009

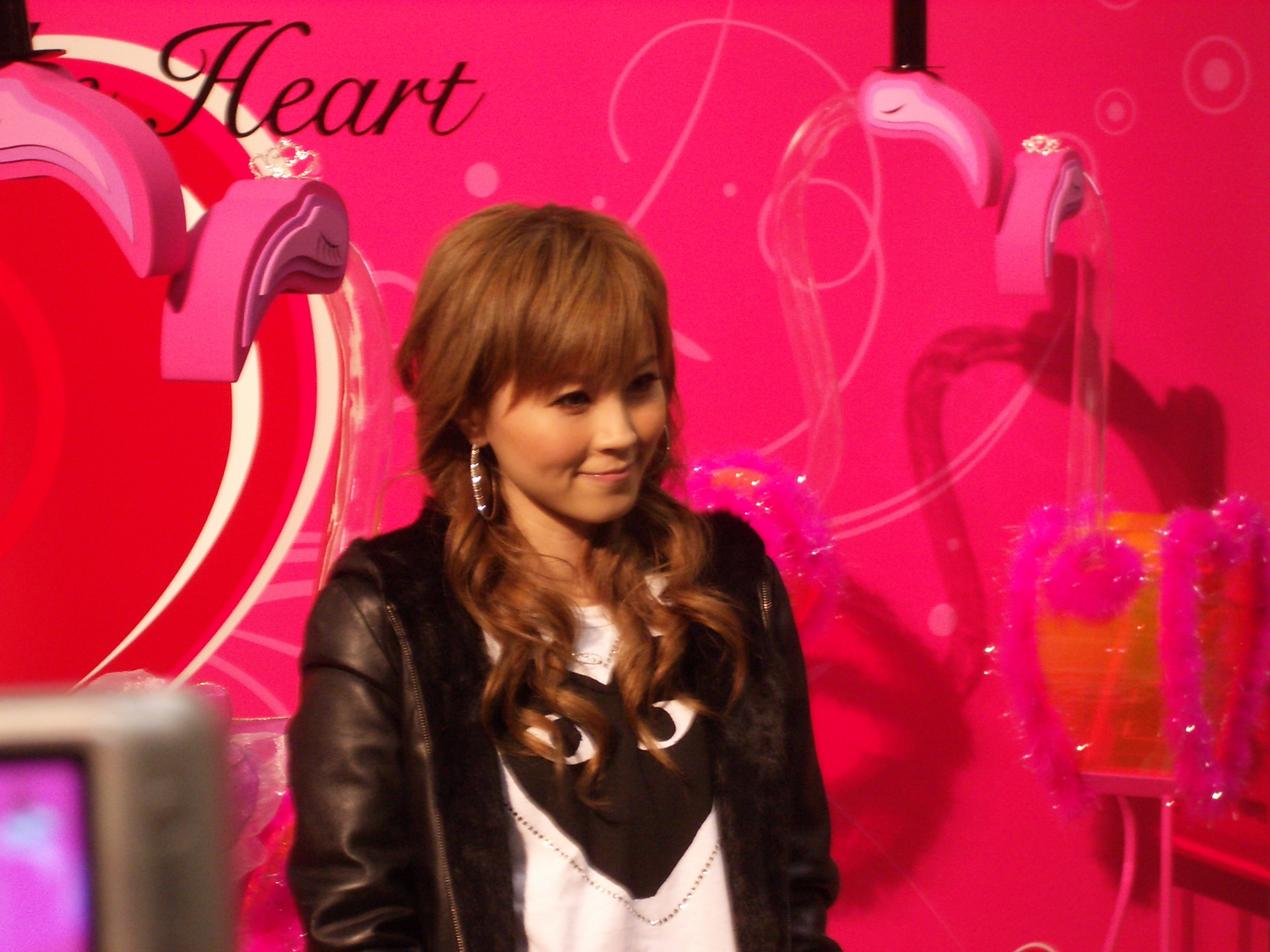
Fu at Times Square in Hong Kong, 2008

Album information
All The Best
- Released: August 13, 2003
- Label: EMI Hong Kong
4 Play
- Release date: January, 2004
- Label: EMI Hong Kong
4 in Love
- Release date: December 17, 2004
- Label: EMI Hong Kong
903 California Red: Eleven Fires Concert(11團火音樂會)
- Release date: October, 2004
- Label: EMI Hong Kong

=== Solo ===
Album information
My Cup of T (EP)
- Released: July 27, 2007
- Label: Gold Label Records
Smiling
- Release date: July 23, 2008
- Label: Gold Label Records
Dearest (EP)
- Release date: February 13, 2009
- Label: Gold Label Records
Metamorphosis (EP)
- Release date: December 17, 2010
- Label: Filmko Entertainment Limited

=== Appearances in other albums ===
Album information	Tracks contributed
Be Good: Artist: Alex Fong; Released: 2005; Label: EMI	2. "Hurting Yourself, Hurting Others" (自欺欺人)
LOVE 05: Artist: Various artists; Released: 2005; Label: EMI	Disc 2 - track 8. "Hurting Yourself, Hurting Others" (自欺欺人)
LOVE 06 情歌集 (2006 Love Songs Collection): Artist: Various artists; Released: 2006; Label: EMI	10. "Drifting Between Calm and Passionate" (冷靜熱情之間) with Alex Fong and Stephy Tang

== Filmography ==
=== Films ===
Year	English title	Original title	Role	Notes
2002	Nine Girls and A Ghost	九個女仔一隻鬼	Pepper	
2003	Feel 100%	百分百感覺 2003	Jenny	
2004	Dating Death	失驚無神	Ah-shu	
2005	Kung Fu Mahjong	雀聖	Cheryl	
2005	Dragon Reloaded	龍咁威2	Female cop	
2006	McDull, the Alumni	春田花花同學會		
2006	Marriage with a Fool	獨家試愛	Ah-kei	
2006	Undercover Hidden Dragon			
2006	Love @ First Note	戀愛初歌	Philo	
2006	Fatal Contact		Chui Chi	
2006	Mr. 3 Minutes	三分鐘先生	Fa-fa	
2007	ICAC Investigations			
2007	The Haunted School	校墓處	Ho Yat-man	
2009	All's Well, Ends Well 2009	家有囍事 2009	Birthday party guest	
2010	Martial Spirit	武動青春		
2011	Beach Spike	熱浪球愛戰	Rachel	
2012	Dark Wedding			
2013	4th Floor, Block B			
2014	Love at Every Sight			
2014	Forget All Remember	37次想你		
2015	The Treasure			
2017	The Door			

=== TV series ===
Year	English title	Original title	Role	Channel	Notes
2003	Aqua Heroes	戀愛自由式	Theresa 溫柔	TVB	
2003	Hearts of Fencing	當四葉草碰上劍尖時	Alumni student	TVB	Guest appearance
2005	The Zone	奇幻潮	Cheung Pui Pui 張佩佩	TVB	Appeared in episode 2
2007	ICAC Investigators 2007	廉政行動2007	Cheung Lai San 張麗珊	TVB	Appeared in episode 4
2020	Iron Ladies	熟女強人	關始立	ViuTV	

== Bibliography ==
- Tian Mimi (甜蜜蜜) (January, 2007)
- T With Sunshine (我和陽光在一起) (July, 2007)
- Life is Beautiful (雨後陽光) (2007) -- Postcard book
- 我會快樂的(July 2009)
- Life is like a Ferris Wheel (July 2012)

== See also ==
- Cookies (group)
