= B420 =

2005 Hong Kong film by Matthew Tang

b420
- Film poster
- Directed by: Matthew Tang
- Written by: Matthew Tang
- Produced by: Philip Lee
- Starring: Ben Hung; Sam Lee; Miki Yeung
- Edited by: Matthew Tang
- Release date: 17 November 2005
- Running time: 85 minutes
- Country: Hong Kong
- Language: Cantonese

b420 is a 2005 Hong Kong film directed by Mathew Tang. The film is set in Macau and is a comedy-drama. It is an independent film with a low budget. The tagline of the movie is "Before Twenty... Before Too Old".

b420's title is in reference to "before 20, before too old". According to Tang, "There's a big difference in life from when you're in a school uniform than when you're not." Starring Miki Yeung, Sam Lee, and Ben Hung Jin-Ming, the film tells the story of three adolescents as they become adults and what they think about death, love, and life.

== Production ==
b420 grew out of Tang's project at the City University of Hong Kong School of Creative Media. Tang tried to secure backing from film studios but received conflicting rejections. While a studio told him the film was excessively "commercial", a second studio responded that the film was not sufficiently commercial. Using nearly all of his money, Tang chose to self-finance the film.

== Cast ==
Cast and roles include:

- Ben Hung as Simon
- Sam Lee as Willy
- Miki Yeung as Koey
- Zeni Wong as Siu Wan

== Reception ==
Variety film critic Russell Edwards wrote, "Helmer's obvious talent and the first-rate perfs keep pic's tempo breezy, but the transition to fully-fledged drama (courtesy of a ransom scam at the three-quarter mark) is not entirely convincing. Similarly, minor plot strands which tie Koey's Web site buddies to the main drama are awkwardly executed."

=== Awards ===
The film was admitted by several international film festivals. It won the Grand Prix Award in the 19th Fukuoka Asian Film Festival, and was awarded Best Film in the 4th Viennese Youth International Film Festival.

b420 was one of the two opening films of the 2005 Hong Kong Asian Film Festival.
