= 72 Tenants of Prosperity =

2010 Hong Kong film by Eric Tsang

- Film poster

Chinese name
- Traditional Chinese: 72家租客
- Simplified Chinese: 72家租客
Transcriptions
Standard Mandarin
- Hanyu Pinyin: Qī shǐ ér jiā zū ké
Yue: Cantonese
- Jyutping: Cat1 sap6 ji6 gaa1 zo1 haak3
- Directed by: Eric Tsang; Patrick Kong; Chung Shu-kai
- Written by: Wong Yeung Tat; Patrick Kong
- Story by: Wong Yeung Tat; Patrick Kong; Eric Tsang; Riley Yip; Yan Pak-wing; Yip Tin-shing
- Produced by: Eric Tsang
- Starring: Jacky Cheung; Eric Tsang; Anita Yuen; Bosco Wong; Stephy Tang; Linda Chung; Wong Cho Lam
- Cinematography: Tony Cheung
- Edited by: Wenders Li
- Music by: Tang Chi-wai; Johnny Yim; Ben Chong
- Production companies: Shaw Brothers Studio; Television Broadcasts Limited; United Filmmakers Organization; Sil-Metropole Organisation; Sun Wah Media Group; Celestial Pictures
- Distributed by: Television Broadcasts Limited
- Release date: 11 February 2010
- Running time: 98 minutes
- Country: Hong Kong
- Language: Cantonese
- Box office: HK$34,447,831

72 Tenants of Prosperity (72家租客) is a 2010 Hong Kong comedy film co-directed and produced by Eric Tsang for Shaw Brothers Studio. It also stars Tsang himself, as well as other actors.

Released in Hong Kong, Malaysia, Australia, and New Zealand on 11 February 2010, other production companies include Television Broadcasts Limited, United Filmmakers Organization, Sil-Metropole Organisation and Sun Wah Media Group.

This film used the 1973 film The House of 72 Tenants as a blueprint but involves a new story, with only some roles identical. This is the first film to introduce the new 2010 Shaw opening theme with a shortened version of the original fanfare.

The film spoofs other movies such as Ip Man and Murderer, and makes references to Hong Kong culture and events that were figured in the media that year, such as the death of Michael Jackson and the Mong Kok acid attacks.

== Plot ==
In 1970s Hong Kong, rapacious landlords try to evict 72 tenants but sworn brothers Ha Kung and Shek Kin help the group of 72 defeat the landlord and landlady and coincidentally rescue Pinky from a planned forced marriage. When both sworn brothers fall for Pinky and propose to her, she flips a coin heads or tails, they both cheated during the toss but Ha wins her hand in marriage.

The sworn brothers become sworn enemies and Sheks hatred fuels intense rivalry against Ha in business dealings ranging from the manufacture of plastic flowers to the selling of stinky bean curd. Even after 40 years they continue to clash and in 2010 they are in keen competition selling electronics appliances in Sai Yeung Choi Street, Mongkok, the busiest street in the city and still home to the 72 tenants.

In fiercely competitive Sai Yeung Choi Street high rents force businessmen to use every means to survive, with electronics shops employing pseudo models in sales promotion campaigns and comic shops offering foot-massage services by Lolita, etc. These ploys are minor compared with the tactics of the landlord who threatens to close down the shops unless his demands for tripled rent are met. Amidst this strife and struggle the street is hit by acid-attacks and in high spirits the 72 tenants unite and pledge to safeguard their home.

Against a background of fear and turmoil, with the old love triangle between Ha and Pinky and Shek still festering, the next generation of the Ha and Shek families generate their own love affairs: MJ-style dancer Ha Junior is fascinated by Shek's daughter who is a Japanese AV culture fan; Ha's daughter, a kung fu expert, is pursued by Shek's love-struck son, the smart shortie. Affairs of the heart yet to be resolved.

== Cast ==
=== The Ha family ===
Cast	Role	Description
Eric Tsang; Justin Lo (youth)	Ha Kung 哈公	Shek Kin sworn brother turned sworn enemy Pinky's husband Ha Junior and Ha Nui's father "Hoi Phone Fu" owner
Anita Yuen; Fala Chen (youth)	Pinky 小桃紅	Tai Chi Bing and Aunt Three's adopted daughter Ha Kung and Shek Kin's love interest Ha Kung's wife Ha Junior and Ha Nui's mother
Bosco Wong	Ha Junior 哈太郎	Ha Kung and Pinky's son Ha Nui's older brother Wu Lei Yuk's boyfriend A MJ Fan/MJ-style dancer
Linda Chung	Ha Nui 哈女	Ha Kung and Pinky's daughter Ha Junior's younger sister Kin Chai's girlfriend A kung fu maiden

=== The Shek family ===
Cast	Role	Description
Jacky Cheung; Raymond Lam (youth)	Shek Kin 石堅	Ha Kung's sworn brother turned into sworn enemy Wu Lei Yuk and Kin Chai's father Pinky's admirer "Ting Tai Phone" mobile store owner
Stephy Tang	Wu Lei Yuk 胡里玉	Shek Kin's daughter Ha Junior's girlfriend Kin Chai's younger sister AV vice-director
Wong Cho Lam	Kin Chai 堅仔	Shek Kin's short son Wu Lei Yuk's older brother Ha Nui's boyfriend

=== The Tai family ===
Cast	Role	Description
Gordon Lam	Prince Bing 太子炳	The Landlord; Aunt Three's husband Pinky's adopted father Bobo's own father (villain)
Charmaine Sheh	Aunt Three 三姑	The Landlady; Tai Chi Bing's wife Pinky's adopted mother Bobo's own mother (villain)
Kate Tsui	Bobo 波波	Syndicate Secretary person who threw the strong acid to Sai Yeung Choi Street; Tai Chi Bing and Aunt Three's daughter (villain)
Anita Yuen; Fala Chen (youth)	Pinky 小桃紅	See The Ha Family

=== Hoi Phone Fu ===
Cast	Role	Description
Emily Kwan (關寶慧)		"Hoi Phone Fu" employee
Chu Mi Mi (朱咪咪)		"Hoi Phone Fu" employee
Ma Tai Lo (馬蹄露)		"Hoi Phone Fu" employee
Ron Ng	Vincent	"Hoi Phone Fu" employee
Andy Hui		"Hoi Phone Fu" employee
Kara Hui		"Hoi Phone Fu" employee
Ram Chiang (蔣志光)		"Hoi Phone Fu" employee
Rosanne Lui (呂珊)		"Hoi Phone Fu" employee
Chun Wong (秦煌)		"Hoi Phone Fu" employee
Joe Junior		"Hoi Phone Fu" employee
Tai Yiu Ming (戴耀明)		"Hoi Phone Fu" employee

=== Ting Tai Phone ===
Cast	Role	Description
Timmy Hung		"Ting Tai Phone" mobile store employee
Denise Ho		"Ting Tai Phone" mobile store employee
Sherman Chung		"Ting Tai Phone" mobile store employee
Ryan Hui (許懷欣)		"Ting Tai Phone" mobile store employee
Tat Dik (狄易達)		"Ting Tai Phone" mobile store employee
Vincy Chan		"Ting Tai Phone" mobile store employee
Yoyo Chen		"Ting Tai Phone" mobile store employee
Kayi Cheung		"Ting Tai Phone" mobile store employee
Toby Leung		"Ting Tai Phone" mobile store employee
Benjamin Yuen		"Ting Tai Phone" mobile store employee
Jacky Heung		"Ting Tai Phone" mobile store employee
Joel Chan		"Ting Tai Phone" mobile store employee
Lam Yuen Ha (林婉霞)		Promoting "Ting Tai Phone" models
Samantha Ko		Promoting "Ting Tai Phone" models
Jeanette Leung (梁政玨)		Promoting "Ting Tai Phone" models
Koni Lui	Chai Wan 柴灣	Mobile phone salesman
Yuri Chan (陳蕊蕊)	Ching Yee 青衣	Mobile phone salesman
Kibby Lau (劉俐)	Choi Hung 彩虹	Mobile phone salesman
Vanco Wong (王淑玲)	Tai Po 大埔	Mobile phone salesman
Kimmy Kwan (關婉珊)	Chuen Wan 荃灣	Mobile phone salesman
Lily Ho	Lucky	

=== Other cast ===
==== 1960s ====
Cast	Role	Description
Sunny Chan	Tailor Man 裁縫佬	Tailor
Joe Ma	Doctor Kam 金醫生	Doctor
Lawrence Ng	Paul Ching Chi Mei 程至美	Doctor
Raymond Cho	Chris Heung Chung Yan 向眾仁	Doctor
Ben Wong	Leung Yue Sang 梁羽生	
Derek Kwok	Aircraft Fuk 飛機福	Sells Aircraft Rugby
Joyce Cheng	Shanghai Lady 上海婆	
Tracy Ip	Fuk So 福嫂	Fuk's wife
Joyce Tang	Mrs. Tailor 裁縫太太	Tailor Man's wife
Kaki Leung (梁嘉琪)	Flower Girl 賣花女	
Chuk Man Kwan		
Eileen Yeow		Matchmaker
David Lo (盧大偉)	Officer Chan 陳局長	Chief Police Officer; Wants to marry Pinky

==== 2010 ====
Cast	Role	Description
Michael Tse	Laughing Gor; Laughing哥	Triad leader Undercover cop
Wayne Lai	Astro 阿桐木	Comic store owner
Nancy Sit	Lolita	Comic store employee
Bernice Liu	Bullet-tooth Jane 彈牙珍	Owns a fishball stall
Kevin Cheng		Fireman
Kenneth Ma		Fireman
Myolie Wu	Myolie Wu 胡杏兒	Pretends as AV actress Sora Aoi
Chin Kar-lok		
Tats Lau		Doctor
Prudence Liew	Siu Hung 小紅	Shek Kin's good friend
Ella Koon	Tin Mi Mi 田咪咪	Swindler
Lam Suet	Mr. Lam 林先生	"Ting Tai Phone" customer
Kitty Yuen		Fortune teller
Sammy Leung		
Jack Hui		Pilot
Aurelien Ng (吳雲甫)		Pilot
Kimmy Kwan (關婉珊)		Stewardess
Vanco Wong (王淑玲)		Stewardess
Marcus Kwok (郭田葰)		
Louis Yuen		
Oscar Leung (梁烈唯)		Restaurant employee
6Wing (陸永權)		Mobile phone engineer
Ckwan Cheung (鄭詩君)		Mobile phone engineer
Aimee Chan		Survey staff
Kingdom Yuen (苑瓊丹)		
Tsui Ming (徐萌)		
Sherry Chen (陳爽)		
Chu Ching Yee (朱倩兒)		
Yung Kai Nei (翁佳妮)		
Janice Ting (丁樂鍶)		
Lau Siu Kwan (劉少君)		
Natalis Chan	Natalis Chan 陳百祥	Restaurant owner
Chin Siu Ho	Fishy 金魚佬	
Wu Fung	Uncle Wah 華叔	Bookstore owner
William So		
Dicky Cheung		Catchpole
Kelly Chen	Kelly Chen 陳慧琳	Singer
Mak Cheung-ching		Shoe store owner
Angela Tong		Cellphone Customer
Jamie Chik		Tenant
Tin Kai-Man (田啟文)	Four Chai Man 四仔佬	
Sam Lee	Tennish shoe Man 波鞋佬	
Maggie Shiu		Policewoman
Janet Chow		
Terence Chui (小肥)		Street performer
Carlo Ng (吳家樂)		Food stall waiter
Peter Lai (黎彼得)		Food stall customer
Gill Mohindepaul Singh		Appears in the news
Wong Ching (王青)		
Natalie Tong		
Shum Oi Lam (沈愛琳)		
Fala Chen	Siu Fui Hung 小灰熊	
Ku Feng	Tin Ngan 天眼	
