= Delete My Love =

2014 Hong Kong film by Patrick Kong

- Delete My Love theatrical poster
- Traditional Chinese: Delete愛人
- Simplified Chinese: Delete爱人
- Jyutping: Delete ngoi3 jan4
- Directed by: Patrick Kong
- Written by: Patrick Kong
- Produced by: Aaron Liao; Duncan Chui
- Starring: Wong Cho-lam; Ivana Wong; Michael Hui
- Cinematography: Kenny Tse Chung-To
- Edited by: Li Ka-Wing
- Music by: Raymond Wong
- Production companies: Cheers Studio Ltd. Sil-Metropole Organisation Ltd. Zhujiang Film&Media Corp. Ltd.
- Distributed by: Newport Entertainment Co. Ltd.
- Release dates: 11 April 2014 (China); 8 May 2014 (Hong Kong)
- Running time: 101 minutes
- Country: Hong Kong
- Language: Cantonese
- Box office: US$4,678,632

Delete My Love (Chinese: Delete愛人) is a 2014 Hong Kong romantic comedy film directed and written by Patrick Kong and starring Wong Cho-lam, Ivana Wong and Michael Hui.

== Plot ==
So Po-wing or So Boring as everyone calls him doesn't have much going for him, career and personally. He has a boss from hell, toxic co-workers that steal his ideas and sabotage him, an office that doubles as the company storage room and an incompetent assistant that lets his co-workers steal his ideas just because they flirt with her. At home he has a younger sister that is a compulsive gambler and a mother that tries to trick him into selling the home his deceased grandfather left him. The only bright spot in his life is his ditsy girlfriend Bobo who always thinks she is dying and his loyal friend Wah Dee who tries to cheer him up but ends up making matters worse.

On his birthday his boss fires him for being an under-performing worker. So Boring accidentally kills his boss when trying to beg for his job. While trying to hide the body he receives a strange text on his phone that asks him "If you can delete those you don't like what would it be?", not caring he deletes the text while making the wish that he only wanted a nice boss. When he heads back to the office he finds out that his boss has changed to a super nice guy who lets his employee party and take unlimited extended paid vacation days. His "deleted to" boss is so nice that he lets So Boring run his company.

Realizing his new-found powers he soon starts deleting those that annoys him. His chubby assistant to a slim girl, dysfunctional mother and sister to a proper mother that cooks and a well behaved sister, best friend to a pirated Iron Man Tony Stark and Bobo's childhood friend who wants to marry her to a middle age men with a heavy country accent. He finally realizes he has gone too far when he accidentally deletes Bobo to a slutty blossomy mainland girl who exaggerates when she talks. Soon after, he starts to see the negative side of the "deleted to" versions of each individual when his "deleted to" boss frames him when needing to fire all the employees, mother only cooks one dish over and over again, girlfriend sexually harasses his best friend and a best friend that wants a homosexual relationship with him.

When confronting his "deleted to" boss for framing him he makes a wish for his original boss to come back, which does bring his original boss back. His original boss questions how he knows how to delete people since he had also deleted his original family years ago. As the two think on how to bring their original love ones back his boss's "deleted to" wife overhears their conversation and informs her "deleted to" son and daughter. His boss's "deleted to" family not wanting to change back decides to kill So Boring and his boss. The two escape death and brings his boss's retro style computer to be fixed so they can find out how to bring their original loved ones back, but it seems in order to bring them back they have to give up everything.

== Cast ==
- Wong Cho-lam as So Po-wing (So Boring)
- Ivana Wong as Bobo Chung
- Michael Hui as Rich Ma
- Alex Fong as Wah Dee
- Yuen Qiu as So Fa
- Nancy Sit as "delete to" So Fa
- Jacquelin Chong as So Yee-si (So Easy)
- Lung Siu-kwan as "delete to" So Yee-si (So Easy)
- Michael Wong as "delete to" Rich Ma
- May Chan as Romantic
- Shiga Lin as "delete to" Romantic
- Eileen Tung as "delete to" Sue Ma
- Dominic Ho as "delete to" Ka-ming
- Samantha Ko as "delete to" Rose
- Maria Cordero as Sue Ma
- Eric Kwok as "delete to" Wah Dee
- Daniella Wang as "delete to" Bobo Chung
- Mimi Chu as Bobo's mother
- Lo Hoi-pang as Bobo's father
- Benz Hui as Wan Siu-lun
- Babyjohn Choi as Wan Duk-fuk
- Bat Leung-gum as "delete to" Wan Duk-fuk
- Bowie Wu as Sun Tong-sau
- Annie Liu as Chu Lei-sin
- Philip Keung as Hak gor
- Bob Lam as photographer
- Julian Cheung as Captain Cool ("delete to" Rich Ma)
- Mak Ling-Ling as "delete to" Rich Ma's fiancée

== Trivia ==
- Alex Fong's character Wah Dee is a parody of Hong Kong actor singer Andy Lau's past movie characters. Notable characters are from such films as A Moment of Romance and Runaway Blues. Instrumental versions of Lau's songs "Secretly Cheating 獨自去偷歡" and "Live a Dashing Life 一起走過的日子" are played in the background during Wah Dee's appearances.
- The background music played during Nancy Sit's montage is the opening theme song from TVB's long-running soap opera A Kindred Spirit, which Sit also happens to star in as the motherly Leung Yun Ho.
- Eric Kwok's appearance is modeled after Robert Downey, Jr.'s Iron Man Tony Stark character.
- Wong Cho-lam, Ivana Wong, Mimi Chu, Bowie Wu, May Chan and Bob Lam starred in TVB's 2013 comedy drama Inbound Troubles, for which Wong Cho-lam also served as a writer.
- Julian Cheung's cameo role as Captain Cool aka "delete to" Rich Ma no. 2 is in reference to his role as Jayden Koo in TVB's 2013 drama Triumph in the Skies II.
- The film constantly takes jabs at ATV, the main rival television station of TVB. A majority of the actors in the film are contracted TVB artistes.

== Reception ==
The film has grossed ¥12.3 million (US$1,980,000) in China. The film grossed HK$1.23 million (US$158,000) on the opening weekend in Hong Kong.
