= Stephy Tang =

Hong Kong actress and singer

- 鄧麗欣
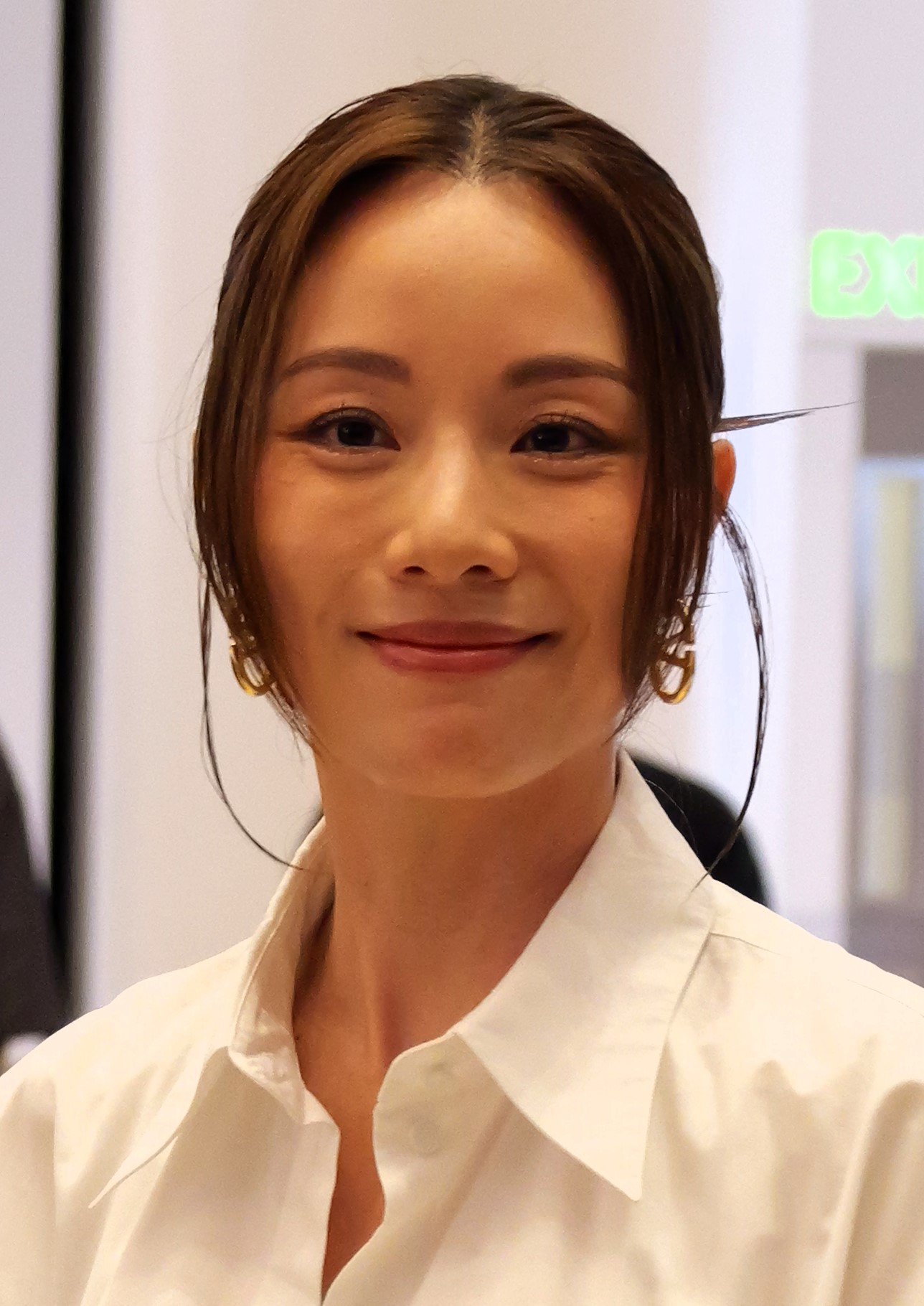
- Tang in 2024
- Born: 15 October 1983 (age 42); British Hong Kong
- Occupations: Singer; actress
- Years active: 2002–present
- Partner(s): Alex Fong (2006–2016); Prince Chiu (2018–2021)
- Awards: Hong Kong Film Critics Society Award for Best Actress; 2017 The Empty Hands
- Musical career
- Genre: Cantopop
- Instrument: Vocals
- Labels: Gold Label (2002–2011); Neway Star (2011–2014); Sun Entertainment Culture (2014–2016); Supreme Art Entertainment (2017–present)
- Formerly of: Cookies

Chinese name
- Traditional Chinese: 鄧麗欣
- Simplified Chinese: 邓丽欣
Transcriptions
Standard Mandarin
- Hanyu Pinyin: Dèng Lìxīn
Yue: Cantonese
- Jyutping: Dang6 Lai6-jan1

Stephy Tang Lai-yan (Chinese: 鄧麗欣; born 15 October 1983) is a Hong Kong singer and actress. She was formerly the leader of the Cantopop group Cookies. She won the Hong Kong Film Critics Society Award for Best Actress in 2017 for her performance in The Empty Hands, and was nominated twice for the Hong Kong Film Award for Best Actress.

== Early life ==
Tang is a Hakka of Dongguan ancestry, and is able to speak Hakka, Cantonese and Mandarin. She graduated from Buddhist Sum Heung Lam Memorial College and the Hong Kong Institute of Vocational Education's Department of Fashion Design.

She represented Hong Kong in volleyball since Form 1 mainly as a left wing spiker or libero, but gave up to pursue a career in the entertainment industry. In March 2015, Tang, who became a fashion label founder/owner (Loey), got sponsorship from the shop to reassemble a women's volleyball team, with herself being a left wing spiker as well as the captain and founder of the team (she cannot become a captain as a libero), and participated in an open-grade C-class qualifications, where it got a record of a win and a loss. She then led Loey to play charity matches against Chinese National Volleyball team, and had trained in Taiwan against secondary school teams in late 2015.

== Career ==
=== Musical career ===
In 2002, she started her singing career in the Hong Kong music group Cookies and became the lead singer. The main style of music from Cookies was teen pop. When Tang started her solo singing career, her record company, EMI, wanted a change to a more grown-up look and style. Some songs on her first album, Coloring Stephy, had a more mature and soft jazz influence than her previous music in Cookies. Generally, the album was widely heard and was popular, and it was certified Gold by IFPI Hong Kong.

She sang with Alex Fong in 「好心好報」, 「好好戀愛」, 「十分．愛(合唱版)」 (which won a Jade Solid Gold Award for the best duet in 2006), 「我的最愛」, 「重愛」,「七年」,「同屋主」and 「危城」. She also appeared on TVB's variety show Beautiful Cooking.

Tang's second solo album was Fantasy. The album had a total of five editions. One was a deluxe edition which contains a DVD featuring her music videos from this album. The only difference between the other four was the color themes of the album covers: red, yellow, blue, and green, which were four different themes for photo shoots.

Her third album is Dating Stephy. This album also features different covers, and a special edition was released three months after the original release. The album also sold as well as her previous two. There was no official announcement of the certification, as Gold Label Entertainment Ltd and EMI Music Hong Kong did not participate in IFPI Hong Kong. However, the newspapers announced that Dating Stephy has sold over 30,000 in one month, and it was at least Gold certified.

In 2007, she performed at the S.U.C.C.E.S.S. Charity Gala at Vancouver, British Columbia, Canada with many other artists.

Tang performed her first headline solo concert, called "Stephy, See Thru Live 2007". It was held from December 7 to 9, 2007 at the Star Hall in Hong Kong. A live album was released featuring songs performed at this concert.

She also did a Mandarin version of "Breaking Free" from High School Musical with Anson Hu.

Tang released her new album The Red Album in November 2008. Some tracks in this album, such as "女兒紅", have led to media attention on the improvement in Tang's voice.

In July 2009, Tang published her first romance novel, Running Alongside Me (陪著我走). The book takes the form of a diary about a girl who has recently broken up with her lover. She goes on a cruise and writes about the things she sees and does. This book also includes 100+ pages of photos, making it a photo book as well.

In December 2009, Tang released her collection of "Greatest Hits" plus "New Songs" songs in a 2CD+ DVD Collection called 'Music Cafe' which includes four new songs, including Running Alongside Me, which served as the same name as her novel. The collectors edition comes with a mousepad featuring Tang's face that is available in two designs.

In 2010, Tang released the dance-driven mini-album “No One Knows” with the intention of showing a different side of her personality.

In 2011, Tang left her previous record company Gold Typhoon and signed to Neway Star as her new record label.

=== Acting career ===
In 2002, Stephy Tang played the role of Kaka in Nine Girls and a Ghost, which starred the full Cookies team and Edison Chen. She also sang the song 不要離我太遠 for the film. The next year she performed in TVB drama series Aqua Heroes, which depicted a youth swimming team, and starred alongside Ronald Cheng in comedy film Dragon Loaded 2003.

Between 2004 and 2016, Tang played the leading roles in several films directed by Patrick Kong, most notably his "Love Quadrilogy" — Marriage with a Fool (2006), Love Is Not All Around (2007), L for Love L for Lies (2008) and Anniversary (2016) — which also starred Alex Fong as the leading actor.

Tang's portrayal of a Karate athlete in The Empty Hands (2017) saw a breakthrough of her acting performance, which earned her the Hong Kong Film Critics Society Award for Best Actress and a nomination for the Hong Kong Film Award for Best Actress. Her performance in My Prince Edward (2020) earned her second nominations in the Hong Kong Film Critics Society Award and the Hong Kong Film Award for Best Actress. She also sang the titular theme song for the film.

In 2020, Tang starred alongside Zeno Koo, Mirror and Error in ViuTV drama series We are the Littles. She portrayed Chiang Ka-yu, a veteran volleyball player-turned coach who trained a novice volleyball team to advance through the top league.

== Personal life ==
Tang and Alex Fong, her on-screen partner in films such as L for Love L for Lies, Love Is Not All Around, Marriage with a Fool and Anniversary, were in a relationship for 10 years. Their relationship was revealed by Mark Lui at his concert at the Hong Kong Coliseum in June 2013. However, on March 15, 2016, Tang and Fong announced the end of their relationship. In 2018, she announced to be in relationship with former JPM member Prince Chiu. Tang and Chiu announced the end of their relationship in 2021.

== Discography ==
=== Cookies ===
Cantonese albums/EPs

1. Happy Birthday (2002)
2. Merry Christmas (2002)
3. All the Best (2003) - first album as Mini-Cookies
4. 4 Play (2004)
5. 4 in Love (2004)

Karaoke albums

1. Holidays (2002)
2. Channel Cookies (2003)

Mini-concert album

- 903 California Red: Eleven Fires Concert (2004)

=== Solo ===
Cantonese albums

1. Coloring Stephy (2005 August 5, 2nd ver:2005 September 28) (Certified Gold 25,000 units shipped in September)
2. Stephy Fantasy (2006 March 28, 2nd ver:2006 June 5) (has sold 20,000 copies)
3. Dating Stephy (2007 February 14, 2nd ver:2007 May 10) (has sold 35,000 copies in May)
4. Stephilosophy (2007 December 21) (Certified Gold 20,000 units shipped in December)
5. The Red Album (2008 November 27)
6. Music Cafe (2009 December 23)
7. No One Knows (2010 July 15)

Other albums

- 17 May 2006 - All About Women (金牌女兒紅) - Track 05 - Let It Flow, and Track 08 - 偏愛 (with Kary Ng (吳雨霏))
- 14 June 2007 - Another Chivas Music Experience Concert Live - Track 10. 愛與痛的邊緣

== Filmography ==
=== Film ===
Year	English title	Original title	Role	Notes/Ref.
2001	Merry-Go-Round		Herself	Cameo
2002	Nine Girls and A Ghost	九個女仔一隻鬼	Ka Ka	
2003	Feel 100%	百分百感覺	Cherie	
2003	Dragon Loaded 2003	龍咁威	Man Ching	
2003	Love Under the Sun		Herself	Cameo
2004	Dating Death	失驚無神	Lily	
2004	My Sweetie	甜絲絲	Chan Tze Keung	
2005	Herbie: Fully Loaded	—N/a	Maggie Peyton	Cantonese voice dub
2006	Marriage with a Fool	獨家試愛	Kwong Mei Bo	
2006	Love @ First Note	戀愛初歌	Amy	
2007	Trivial Matters	破事兒	Cheung Ho Kei	
2007	Love in Macau	濠情歲月	Chu Yanhong	
2007	Love Is Not All Around	十分愛	Kwong Mei Bo	
2007	In Love with the Dead	塚愛	Luk Wai	
2008	L for Love L for Lies	我的最愛	Kwong Mei Bo	
2008	La Lingerie	內衣少女	Ho Kei Miu	
2008	Nobody's Perfect	絕代雙嬌	Lam Fung Kiu	
2009	Love Connected	保持愛你	Bo	
2009	Poker King	撲克王	Ho Siu Yung	
2010	Just Another Pandora's Box	越光寶盒	Painted Skin	Cameo
2010	72 Tenants of Prosperity		Wu Lei Yuk	
2011	All's Well, Ends Well 2011		Arnold Cheng's Niece	
2011	Mr. Zhai	宅男總動員之女神歸來	Wen Rou	
2011	Summer Love Love	戀夏戀夏戀戀下	Herself	Cameo
2011	Let's Go!	None	Annie	
2011	East Meets West 2011	None	Herself	
2011	Hong Kong Ghost Stories	猛鬼愛情故事	Phoenix	Cameo
2012	Princess's Temptation	公主的诱惑		
2012	Love in Time	等，我愛你	Tina/Chi Ling	
2012	The Guillotines	在断头台	Red Devil	
2012	Bleeding Mountain	在山的恶魔	None	
2013	Badges of Fury	不二神探		
2014	The True Love	不愛不散		
2014	Hello Babies			
2014	Golden Brother	男人唔可以窮		
2015	An Inspector Calls	浮華宴		
2015	Guia in Love	燈塔下的戀人		
2015	Anniversary	紀念日	Chung Ka Bo	
2015	Opus 1			
2016	Special Female Force	辣警霸王花		
2016	L for Love L for Life Too	失戀日		
2017	Paradox	貪狼		
2017	Kick Ball	仙球大戰		
2017	The Empty Hands	空手道	Mari Hirakawa	Won Best Actress at HK Film Critics Awards & HK Film Awards
2017	Husband Killers	女士復仇		
2017	Somewhere Beyond the Mist		Angela	
2018	A Beautiful Moment	我的情敵女婿	Mrs. Chan	
2018	Lucid Dreams	八步半喜怒哀樂	Tung Tung	
2018	L Storm	L風暴	Eva	
2018	Keyboard Warriors		Or Chi-Nam	
2019	The Invincible Dragon	九龍不敗	Fong Ning	
2019	My Prince Edward	金都	Cheung Lei-fong	
2022	Table for Six	飯戲攻心	Monica	
2023	Shadows	殘影空間	Dr. Tsui Hiu-ching	
2023	Twelve Days	12日	Jeanie	
2024	Table for Six 2	飯戲攻心2	Monica	
2024	Love Lies	我談的那場戀愛	Joan	
2025	Little Red Sweet	紅豆	May	

=== Television series ===
Year	English title	Original title	Role	Notes
2002	Feel 100%	百分百感覺	Herself	
2003	Four Songs, Wonder Tales	當四葉草碰上劍尖時		
2003	Not Just a Pretty Face	美麗在望	Herself	Cameo
2003	Aqua Heroes	戀愛自由式	Poon Siu Fung/Stephy	
2003	Hearts of Fencing	當四葉草碰上劍尖時	Herself	Cameo
2007	Colours of Love	森之愛情	Yan	
2011	Wind and Rain in Peach Blossom Town	風雨桃花鎮		
2012	Chinese Traditional Magic	大戏法	Shen Xin Ping	
2013	Towering Cannon	沖天炮		
2013	To Advance Toward the Victory			Cameo
2019	Haters Gonna Stay	仇老爺爺	Senior student	Cameo
2020	We are the Littles	男排女將	Chiang Ka-yu	Main Role

=== Television shows ===
Year	English title	Original title	Network	Notes/Ref.
2021	Littles Volleyball Games in Summer	力圖打排球	ViuTV	

=== Music video appearances ===
Year	Title
2022	Dear Jane - "What Happened"
2022	Dear Jane - "What Happened (Music Film)"

== Bibliography ==
- 2002 - Delicious Cookies
- 2006 - 不要忘記 (Bat Yiu Mong Gei)
- 2007 - Stephy & Alex 十分愛
- 2008 - 我的最愛Stephy & Alex電影寫真
- 2008 - 內衣少女電影小說 (La Lingerie Movie Novel)
- 2009 - 陪著我走 Visual Diary (Pui Jeuk Ngo Zau)
- 2009 - Heart Sweet 心甜
