= Legendary Assassin =

2008 Hong Kong film by Wu Jing

- Film poster
- Directed by: Wu Jing; Nicky Li
- Written by: Fung Chi-Keung
- Produced by: Paco Wong
- Starring: Wu Jing; Celina Jade; Hui Shiu-hung; Alex Fong Lik-Sun; Sammy Leung; Mark Cheng
- Cinematography: Anthony Pun
- Edited by: Yau Chi-Wai
- Music by: Raymond Wong
- Distributed by: Gold Label Entertainment; Seasonal Film Corporation
- Release date: 5 December 2008
- Running time: 89 minutes
- Country: Hong Kong
- Language: Cantonese
- Budget: HK$30 million

Legendary Assassin (Chinese: 狼牙) is a 2008 Hong Kong action film directed by Wu Jing in his directorial debut, who also starred in the lead role, and also features fight choreography by Nicky Li. The film also marks the screen debut of singer, songwriter and model Celina Jade (daughter of Snake in the Eagle's Shadow and Game of Death II film star Roy Horan). Wu stars as a mysterious martial artist, who become a female cop's prime suspect in a murder investigation.

== Cast ==
- Wu Jing as Bo, a mysterious martial arts expert whose warmth is masked behind his chilly facade.
- Celina Jade as Holly, a small-time cop stationed on an outlying island.
- Hui Shiu-hung as Grant Gong, a veteran cop on the outlying island, who is a father figure to Holly.
- Alex Fong Lik-Sun as Handson, a narcissistic cop.
- Sammy Leung as Tarzan, the lowest-ranking cop on the island, who uses his arrogance to hide his inferiority complex.
- Ronald Cheng as Uncle Fung Chi-Keung, an eccentric, restaurant owner.
- Kou Zhan Wen as Chairman Timothy Ma, a ruthless crime boss and the world's most wanted criminal. Kou and Wu Jing grew up together as members of Beijing Wushu Team and Wu considered Kou as his senior.
- Noriko Aoyama as Madam Ma, the wife of Chairman Ma, who eventually takes over her husband's organization.
- Lam Suet as Fat Wing
- Mark Cheng as Commissioner Yu
- Ken Lo as Head of Robbers
- Jiang Bao-Cheng as Robber
- Chen Xin-Qiang as Robber
- Hau Woon-Ling as Maggie

== Production ==
Legendary Assassin marks the directorial debuts of Wu Jing and Nicky Li. Wu Jing had long wished to become a director since he first stepped into the entertainment industry in 1995. Nicky Li, a former fight choreography and stunt member of the Jackie Chan Stunt Team, had collaborated with on several recent projects which include Fatal Contact and Invisible Target. The film was shot with a budget of HK$30 million in Hong Kong. Filming began in March, went on a hiatus by the middle of May and resumed towards end of July, wrapping up filming in September.

== Reception ==
Panos Kotzathanasis said, "Apart from the self-idolization and the no-context aspect, none of which are unusual for the category,'Legendary Killer' is an impressive movie, a tribute to Wu Jing’s abilities, and another must for fans of action/martial arts cinema."
