= L for Love L for Lies =

2008 Hong Kong film by Patrick Kong

- L for Love L for Lies promotional poster
- Directed by: Patrick Kong
- Written by: Patrick Kong
- Produced by: Paco Wong; Tenky Tin
- Starring: Alex Fong Lik-Sun; Stephy Tang; Alice Tzeng; Leila Tong; Miki Yeung; Terry Wu; Stephen Wong Ka Lok; Linda Chung
- Cinematography: Lai Yiu-fai
- Edited by: Wenders Li
- Music by: Raymond Wong
- Production company: Gold Label
- Distributed by: Newport Entertainment
- Release date: 13 March 2008
- Running time: 101 minutes
- Country: Hong Kong
- Language: Cantonese

L for Love L for Lies (stylized L for Love ♥ L for Lies; (Chinese: 我的最愛, literally means My Favorite) is a 2008 Hong Kong film written and directed by Patrick Kong and starring Alex Fong, Stephy Tang and Alice Tzeng.

== Plot ==
Everything was going well for Kwong Mei-Bo (Stephy Tang) until recently. After graduating from college, Bo opened a sweets shop with her longtime boyfriend, Jun (Stephen Wong Ka Lok), thinking that she would eventually marry Jun when everything has been set up and running smoothly. One day, Bo met her old Taiwanese classmate Kei Kei (Alice Tzeng). Kei Kei liked Jun's hard working and nice personality, and decided to steal Jun for her own, not caring about Bo's feelings. Bo not only lost the long time love of her life, but she also lost the sweet shop that she has worked so hard on.

Ah-Man (Leila Tong) is Bo's good friend on the phone. The pretty and attractive Man would often time have some short relationships with other men while concealing all this from her introverted and slow boyfriend, Fung (Terry Wu). Although Man loves Fung, she takes him for granted and thinks he will never leave her despite her selfishness. In the meantime, Fung is two-timing Man with another woman.

After the break-up, Bo found a job as a make-up artist in the mall. Her boss Kuen broke the news of her engagement and invited everyone out to celebrate. At the party, Bo realized that her boss's really young fiancée looked very familiar. She recognized him as her old neighbor Keung (Alex Fong), who had a crush on her before being admitted to teenage prison, but Keung keeps pretending that he doesn't know Bo. A month later, Kuen's wedding was suddenly canceled and Bo found out that her boss's life savings were stolen from the fiancée, who disappeared. Bo unexpectedly met Keung on the streets, learning that he is a conman. Keung finds Bo following him and expects her to sue him, but Bo hires Keung to deceive Kei Kei and let her have a taste of her medicine.

One day, Keung met his ex-girlfriend, Yan (Linda Chung). Yan told Keung that her family will move to Singapore and that he should go visit them. Although Keung had deceived Yan's sister's money, they had forgiven him. In his drunk and self-loathing state, Keung kissed Bo for the second time as she tries to comfort him. As an experienced liar, Keung successfully courted Kei Kei. Being abandoned by Kei Kei, Jun decided to make up with Bo. But Bo has no longer has feelings for Jun because she unknowingly fell in love with Keung. Keung's old thug friends ask him to join in on a kidnapping act, but he rejects.

Meanwhile, Ah-Man finally felt tired and guilty, and decided to set up a stable relationship with Fung. But Fung tells Man that he wants to break up. In the past six months, Fung was secretly dating his co-worker's girlfriend Min (Miki Yeung). Fung finally decided to let go of Man and had chosen Min for a 'back up lover' relationship, which did not last because Min decided to get married with her real boyfriend. This gave Fung new insights and reminded him that he can never be her priority. Thus, he lets go of Man (who is sobbing at the breakup) because he feels she needs someone who can accept her as she is and who she can accept and feel safe with. They were incompatible and he had to put up with her, while she, on the other hand, did some horrible things to Fung, only to regret them immediately afterwards.

Soon, Keung's intentions on deceiving Kei Kei were exposed because her cousin was once deceived by him too. Keung pretends to form an alliance with Kei Kei to expose and humiliate Ah-Bo instead, making her devastated. A few months later, Jun's sweets shop went bankrupt when Kei Kei took all the money and fled. It turns out that it was part of Keung and his apprentice's plan to deceive her. While helping Jun recover from the loss of the sweets shop and employees, Jun and Bo got back together.

Keung, having successfully deceived Kei Kei and got all the money back, watches Bo and Jun from a distance. Bo notices him and walks out of dinner at their sweets shop. The old man that sells egg waffles confirms that her "boyfriend" Keung was there just a while ago. However, before Bo is able to meet up with Keung, his thug friends' failed kidnap attempts resulted in getting Keung involved, and he was beaten on the streets. Keung trudged his bloody body to Bo and Jun's restaurant, hoping to tell her that he loved her. Disappointed that she didn't find Keung, Bo walks back to her restaurant, not knowing that Keung had collapsed a block behind her restaurant and died from loss of blood. The movie ends with Bo and Man finally meeting up in real life, but Bo discovers that Man's new boyfriend was Jun.

== Cast ==
- Alex Fong as Ah Keung
- Stephy Tang as Ah Bo
- Alice Tzeng as Kei Kei
- Leila Tong as Ah Man
- Miki Yeung as Ah Min
- Terry Wu as Ah Fung
- Stephen Wong as Ah Jun
- Linda Chung as Ah Yun
- Natalie Tong as May
- Power Chan as Ah Wei
- Suki Chui as Tiffany
- Sammy Leung as Ah Fei
- Wong Cho-lam as Nam Wei Bo
- Chu Mi-mi as Mrs. Wong
- Wu Jing as Michael
- Kara Hui as Bo's mother
- Cathy Kwan as Cousin
- Chiang Chi-kwong as Bo 's father

== Awards nominations ==
28th Hong Kong Film Awards

- Best Original Film Song (Andrew Chu, Fang Jie, Kary Ng)
