= Rain Lee =

- 李彩華
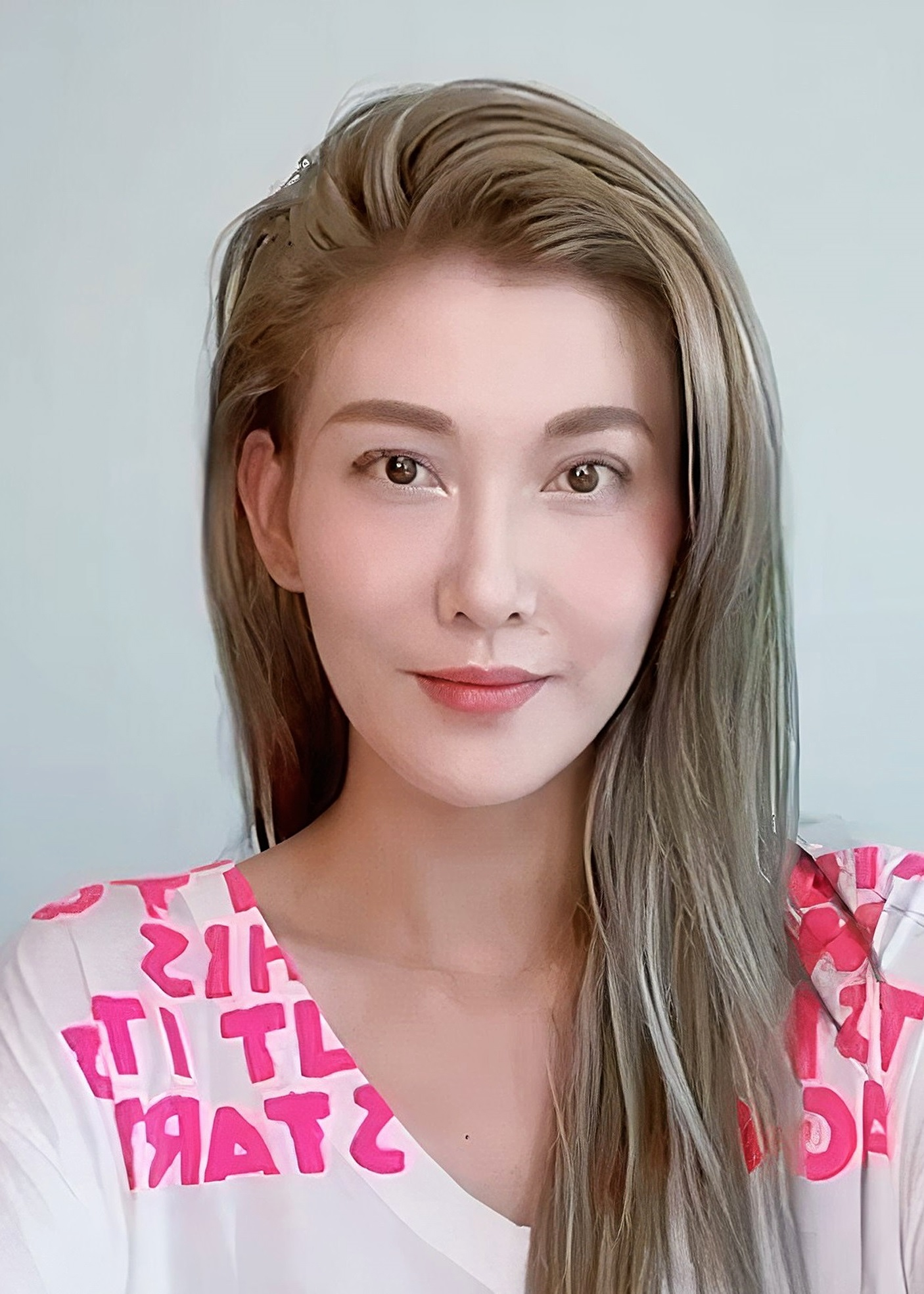
- Lee in 2021
- Born: Lee Choi-wah; 11 November 1982 (age 43); British Hong Kong
- Education: Tung Wah Group of Hospitals Lee Ching Dea Memorial College
- Occupations: Singer; actress
- Years active: 2000–present
- Spouse: Eric Huang (m. 2019; div. 2020)
- Musical career
- Genres: Cantopop, Mandopop
- Instrument: Vocals

Chinese name
- Traditional Chinese: 李彩華
- Simplified Chinese: 李彩华
Transcriptions
Standard Mandarin
- Hanyu Pinyin: Lí Caǐhuá
Yue: Cantonese
- Jyutping: Lei5 Coi2-waa4

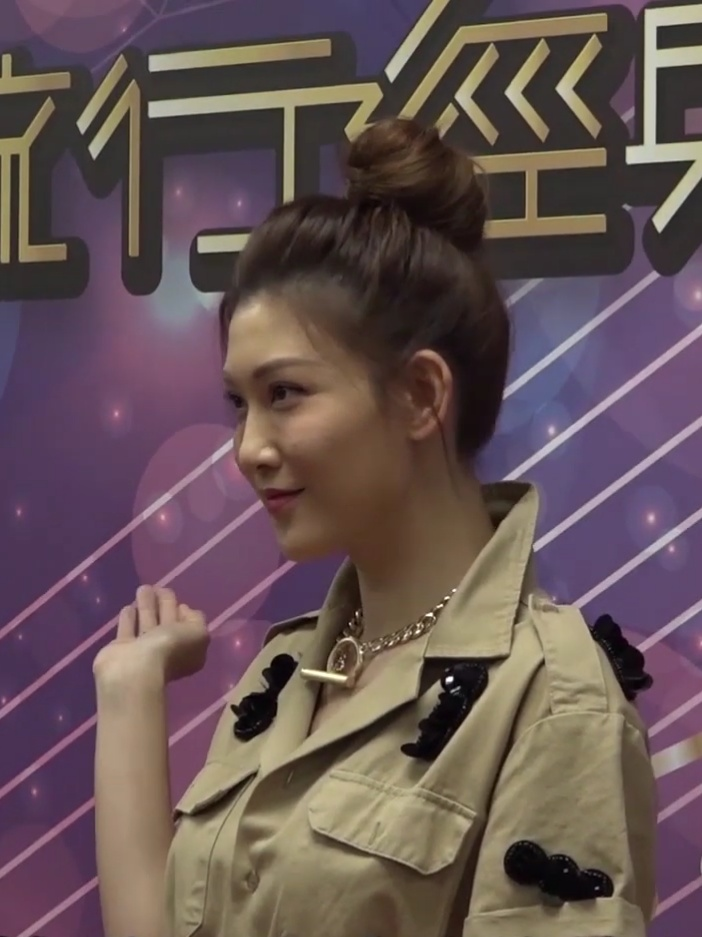
Rain Lee

Rain Lee Choi-wah (Chinese: 李彩華; born 11 November 1982) is a Hong Kong actress and singer.

== Filmography ==
- Stolen Love (2001)
- Goodbye Mr Cool (2001)
- 2002 (2001)
- If U Care ... (2002)
- My Lucky Star (2003)
- Super Model (2004)
- Love on the Rocks (2004)
- Kung Fu Soccer (2004)
- Astonishing (2004)
- Re-Cycle (2006)
- On the Edge (2006)
- Bet to Basic (2006)
- Single Blog (2007)
- House of Mahjong (2007)
- Forest of Death (2007)
- The Land with No Boundary (2011)
- Princess Show (2013)
- The Match (2016)
- Prehistoric War (2018)
- Prison Flowers (2019)

== TV series ==
- Feel 100% (2002)
- Dream of Colours (2004)
- Wong Fei Hung – Master of Kung Fu (2005)
- Wing Chun (2006)
- Flaming Butterfly (2008)
- The Temptation to Go Home (2011)
- Modern Dynasty (2022)
