= Alice Tzeng =

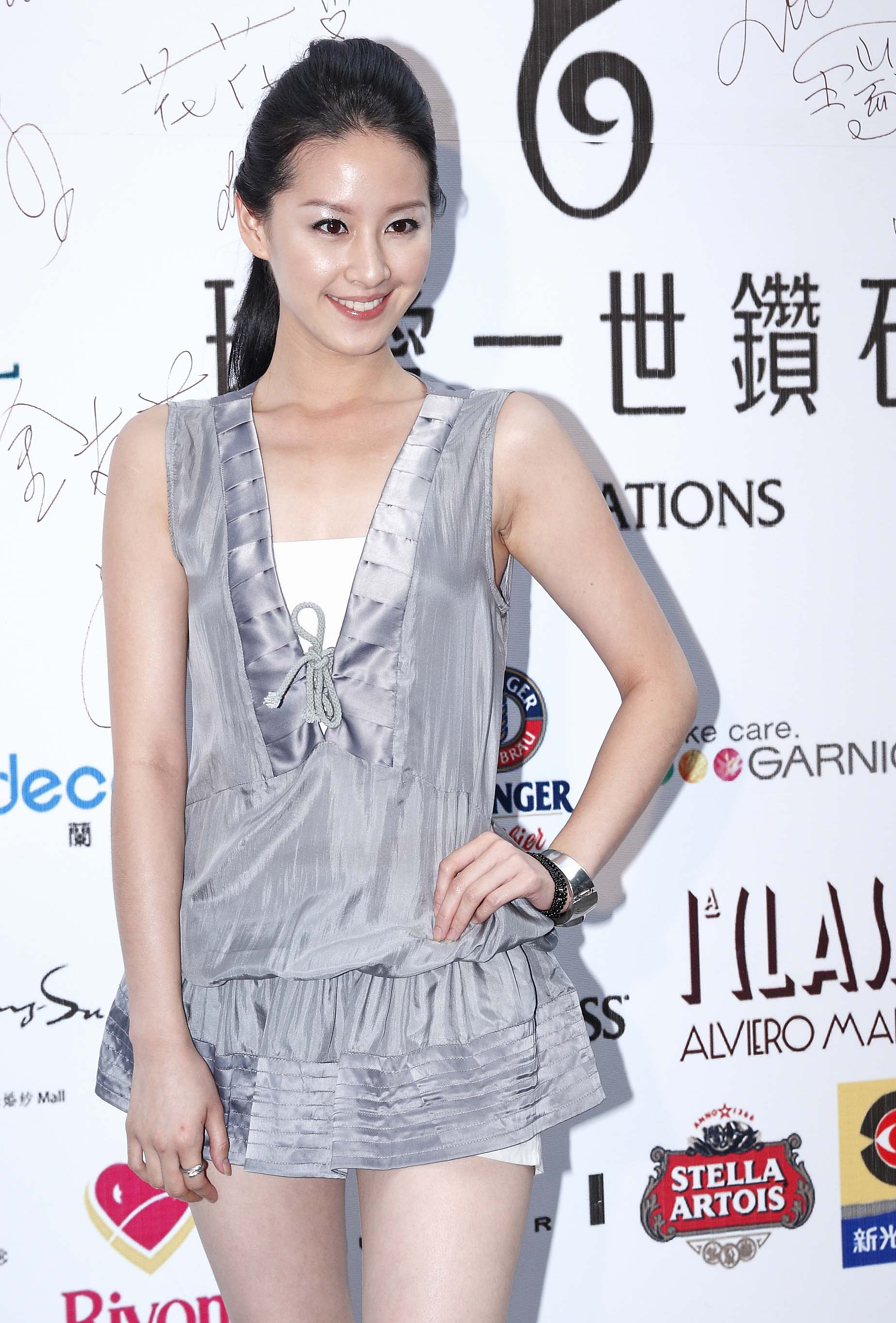
- Tzeng in 2008
- Born: Alice Tzeng; 22 April 1984 (age 42); Taiwan
- Occupations: Actress; model

Chinese name
- Traditional Chinese: 曾愷玹
- Simplified Chinese: 曾恺玹
Transcriptions
Standard Mandarin
- Hanyu Pinyin: Zēng Kǎixuán
Yue: Cantonese
- Jyutping: Tseng Kai-Hsuan
- Musical career
- Also known as: Kai Kai
- Origin: Taiwan

Alice Tzeng (traditional Chinese: 曾愷玹; simplified Chinese: 曾恺玹; pinyin: Zēng Kǎixuán; Wade–Giles: Tseng Kai-Hsuan) is a Taiwanese actress.

== Career ==
Tzeng began her career as a model and appeared in a few advertisements. She gained attention for shooting music videos, especially in Not Good Enough for You by Jay Chou. That same year, she made her movie debut in Secret, directed by Jay Chou. The role earned her a nomination for Best Supporting Actress at the 44th Golden Horse Awards.

She married gallery owner Joseph Chen (陳冠宇), who is 16 years her senior, in 2013, after which she retreated from the entertainment industry. They have a daughter, Janice, born in 2014. In 2024, she made a comeback in the TV show Urban Horror.

== Filmography ==
Year	English Title	Chinese Title	Role	Film Production
2007	Secret (2007 film)	不能說的秘密	Qing Yi	Cathay-Keris Films
2008	L for Love L for Lies	我的最愛	Kei Kei	Gold Label Entertainment
2008	Ballistic	彈道		
2008	Forgive And Forget	親愛的	Chin Chin	
2008	Sleeplessness All Through the Night	公主在台北徹夜未眠	Chen Ching	
2009	L-O-V-E	愛到底	Kai-kai	
2012	Refresh 3+7	刷新3+7	Wang Lu	Chinese Entertainment Shanghai
2012	The Third Wish	第三個願望	I-ying	

== Television series ==
Year	Chinese Title	English Title	Role	Network
2008	原來我不帥	Yuan Lai Wo Bu Shuai	Cindy Xu	FTV
2009	心星的淚光	Xin Xing De Lei Guang	Yan Rui Shan	PTS
2010	星光下的童話	Because of You	Ceng Kai Xuan	CTS
2010	就是要香戀	Scent of Love	Ming Tian Qing	CTV
2011	戀戀阿里山	Lian Lian Alishan	Zeng Jia Yun	CTI
2011	幸福蒲公英	Dandelion Love	Lin Jia Dong	Next TV
2024	都市懼集	Urban Horror	Ya Han	Catchplay

== Music video appearances ==
- "知足" MV by Mayday
- "放手" MV by Vanness Wu
- "Crazy" MV by Alan Ke
- "永久保存" MV by Jason Chan Pak Yu
- "勇敢的愛" MV by 李翊君
- 2007 - "我不配" (I'm Not Worthy) MV from On the Run by Jay Chou
- 2008 - "情歌王" MV as 芷苓 by Leo Ku
- "牽牽牽手" MV by Kenji Wu
- 2008 - "搞笑" MV from Trendy Man by Show Lo
- "我不在乎" MV (Singing Role) by 安志杰
- "撒嬌" MV (Singing Role) by 曾愷玹
