= Alex Fong (singer) =

Hong Kong singer and actor

- 方力申
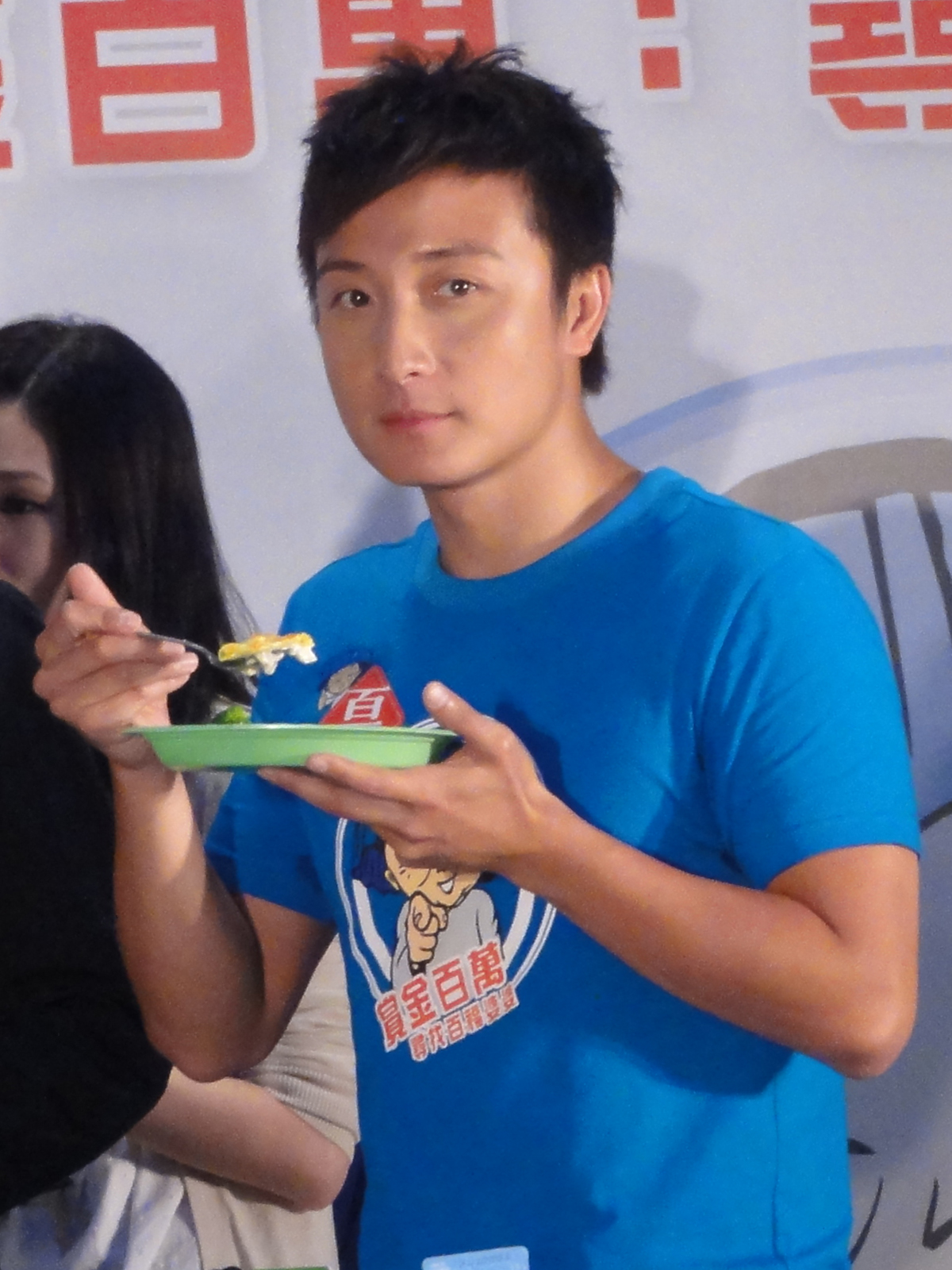
- Fong in 2010
- Born: 26 February 1980 (age 46); British Hong Kong
- Occupations: Actor; singer
- Years active: 2001–present
- Spouse: Maple Yip (m. 2025 - )
- Children: 1
- Musical career
- Also known as: Siu Fong (小方)
- Origin: Hong Kong, China
- Genre: Cantopop
- Instrument: Vocals
- Labels: Universal Music/Go East (2001–2002); Neway Star (2011–present); Gold Label/EMI (2003–2011)
- Sports career
- Nationality: Hong Kong
- Sport: Swimming
- Strokes: Individual medley, backstroke
Medal record
World Masters Championships
Gold medal – first place	2025 Singapore	200 m backstroke
Gold medal – first place	2025 Singapore	200 m medley
Gold medal – first place	2025 Singapore	400 m medley

Chinese name
- Chinese: 方力申
Transcriptions
Standard Mandarin
- Hanyu Pinyin: Fāng Lìshēn
Yue: Cantonese
- Jyutping: Fong1 Lik6-san1
- Website: Official blog

Alexaus Fong Lik-sun (方力申, born 26 February 1980) is a Hong Kong actor, singer and swimmer. He was nicknamed "Little Flying Fish" for his swimming achievements. Until 2021, Fong held several Hong Kong swimming records (and some youth-grade records). He first represented Hong Kong at the age of 11. Fong has also represented Hong Kong at the Sydney Olympics in 2000. He holds a degree in business administration from the University of Hong Kong. Fong caught the attention of record executives with his popularity amongst teenage girls and became a singer in 2001.

He had been assigned to work with Stephy Tang of former pop-group Cookies/Mini Cookies for a number of years. Together, they have eight duets: 好心好報, 好好戀愛, 十・分愛 (winner of the 2006 Jade Solid Gold 'Best Duet Gold Award'), 我的最愛, 重爱 (Mandarin version of 我的最愛), 七年, 同屋主 and 危城.

Fong was also one of the hosts of TVB's hit cooking comedy show, Beautiful Cooking, along with Ronald Cheng and Edmond Leung. On 24 April 2009, Fong and Kary Ng appeared at the Melbourne Arts Center for their 2009 Melbourne show.

In 2011, Fong left his previous record company Gold Typhoon and signed to Huayi Brothers as his new record label.

In July 2016, Fong became an exhibitor with the Art of the Olympians.

== 2000 Summer Olympics – Swimming ==
Fong competed in the 2000 Summer Olympics as part of the Hong Kong Swimming Team. He took part in men's 200 m individual medley, men's 400 m individual medley and men's 200 m backstroke, he won his heats in 400 m individual medley and 200 m backstroke.

He is the current Hong Kong record holder in 200 m backstroke (2:05.47) and 400 m individual medley (4:29.02). Both records were set at the Sydney Olympics. He is also a member of the team that set Hong Kong records for 4×100 m medley relay (3:51.07) and 4×200 m freestyle relay (7:38.91).

== Marathon swimming ==
Fong announced on 1 August 2019 that he would do a Hong Kong Island circumnavigation swim on 5 November to raise money for charity. As part of his training, he did the Clean Half Extreme Marathon Swim, a 15 km marathon swimming race held annually in Hong Kong, and won the race in the solo category. He completed the charity swim in 10 hours and 38 minutes, breaking the previous record set by Simon Holliday in November 2017.

On 19 September 2026, Fong announced that he would participate in a 35 km charity swim from Hong Kong to Macau, organised by the InspiringHK Sports Foundation. He started on 21 November from Peaked Hill near Lantau Island and ended in Hac Sa Beach. He completed the swim in 8 hours, 37 minutes and 24 seconds, breaking the previous record set by Simon Holliday in May 2014.

== Personal life ==
Fong and Stephy Tang, his colleague in multiple movies including L for Love L for Lies (我的最愛), Love Is Not All Around (十分愛), Marriage with a Fool (獨家試愛), and Anniversary (紀念日) have reportedly been in a relationship for 10 years as of 2016. This was announced by Mark Lui at his THANK YOU Concert at the HK Coliseum in June 2013. He is also a guest manager for Tang's amateur volleyball team Loey, named after her own fashion label. As of 18 March 2016, it has been reported that Fong and Tang had ended their 10-year relationship.

In 2023, he revealed in court that he is in a relationship with Maple Yip, who was one of the victims of rape by Jung Myung-seok and was featured in Netflix Munhwa Broadcasting Corporation documentary In The Name of God - A Holy Betrayal. They married in February 2025 and welcomed a daughter, Isla in December 2025.

== Discography ==
=== Albums ===
- Alex Sun (2001)
- One Anniversary (2002)
- Alex Fong New Songs and Best Selections (2003)
- True (2003)
- Never Walk Alone (2004)
- 903 California Red: Eleven Fires Concert (2004)
- Be Good (2005)
- The Lost Tapes: Alex Fong Lik-sun (2006)
- In Your Distant Vicinity (2007)
- Alex Fong 2008 L For Love New and Best Selected (2008)
- Time Flies (2009)
- 7YRS (2009)

== Filmography ==
- 2001 – 2002 (二〇〇二)
- 2002 – Feel 100% (百分百感覺) (Role: Supporting role, with Daniel Chan being the male lead, Starring as female lead: Niki Chow and Rain Li)
- 2002 – Give Them a Chance (給他們一個機會)
- 2003 – My Lucky Star (行運超人)
- 2003 – Sound of Colors (地下鐵)
- 2004 – Elixir of Love
- 2004 – Love on the Rocks (恋情告急) [cameo]
- 2004 – Astonishing
- 2004 – Super Model
- 2005 – My Family (甜孫爺爺) (Role: Male lead with Harwick Lau, Starring with female lead: Shirley Yeung)
- 2006 – McDull, the Alumni (春田花花同學會)
- 2006 – Marriage with a Fool (獨家試愛) (Role: Male lead, Starring as female lead: Stephy Tang)
- 2006 – Troy (Funky Monkey Dance Party II)
- 2006 – I'll Call You (得閑飲茶) (Role: Male lead, Starring as female lead: Viann Liang)
- 2006 – Dating a Vampire (愛上尸新娘) (Role: Male lead, Starring as female lead: Miki Yeung)
- 2006 – Love @ First Note (戀愛初歌) (Role: Male lead with Justin Lo, Starring as female lead: Kary Ng)
- 2007 – Love in Macau
- 2007 – Love Is Not All Around (十分愛) (Role: Male Lead, Starring as female Lead: Stephy Tang)
- 2007 – It's a Wonderful Life (心想事成) (Role: Male Lead with Ronald Cheng, Starring as female lead: Teresa Mo and Louisa So)
- 2007 – Bullet and Brain
- 2008 – L For Love♥ L For Lies (我的最愛) (Role: Male Lead, Starring as female lead: Stephy Tang, Miki Yeung)
- 2008 – Legendary Assassin (狼牙)
- 2009 – I Corrupt All Cops
- 2009 – Kungfu Cyborg
- 2010 – Just Another Pandora's Box
- 2010 – The Fantastic Water Babes
- 2011 – I Love Hong Kong
- 2011 – The Founding of a Party (建党伟业)
- 2011 – Love is the Only Answer (人約離婚後)
- 2011 – Summer Love
- 2011 – Chase Our Love
- 2011 – East Meets West 2011
- 2012 – Love at 30000 Feet
- 2012 – Lan Kwai Fong 2
- 2013 – Badges of Fury
- 2013 – Flash Play
- 2014 – Lan Kwai Fong 3
- 2014 – The True Love
- 2014 – Just Another Margin
- 2014 – The Extreme Fox
- 2014 – Delete My Love
- 2014 – Die Xian Gui Tan
- 2015 – Gun Transit
- 2015 – Midnight Garage
- 2015 – Anniversary
- 2016 – Kidnap Ding Ding Don
- 2016 – L.O.R.D: Legend of Ravaging Dynasties (爵迹)
- 2017 – The Great Escape (明月几时有)
- 2017 – The Founding of an Army (建军大业)
- 2018 – A Beautiful Moment
- 2019 – I Love You, You're Perfect, Now Change!
- 2019 – Fatal Visit
- 2019 – Baby Task Group 2
- 2019 – Love in 50 Meters
- 2019 – The Sexy Guys

=== Television dramas ===
- Feel 100% (TVB, 2002)
- Hearts of Fencing (TVB, 2003)
- Sunshine Heartbeat (TVB, 2004)
- My Family (TVB, 2005)
- Colours of Love (TVB, 2007)
- Dressage to Win (TVB, 2008)
- Twin of Brothers (CCTV-1, 2011)
- Love and Hate (LeTV, 2014)
- Limelight Years (TVB, 2015)
- ICAC Investigators 2022 (TVB, 2022)
- The Beauty of War (TVB, 2022)
- The Mission Run (TVB, 2023)
- Dead Ringer (TVB, Media Asia, Youku, 2023)
- Sinister Beings (Sr. 2) (TVB, 2024)

== Awards ==
Year	Award	Category	Work	Result	Ref
2001	Ultimate Song Chart Awards 叱咤樂壇流行榜頒獎典禮	Ultimate New Male Artist Award	Alex Fong	Bronze Award	
2001	2001 RTHK Top 10 Gold Songs Awards	Best New Prospect Male Artist Award	Alex Fong	Silver Award	
2001	2001 Jade Solid Gold Top 10 Awards	Best Newcomer for Male Artist	Alex Fong	Silver Award	
2003	Metro Showbiz Hit Awards 新城勁爆頒獎禮	Hit Duet Song	Ho Sum Ho Bo (好心好報) with Stephy Tang	Won	
2003	2003 RTHK Top 10 Gold Songs Awards	Top 10 Songs	Ho Sum Ho Bo	Won	
2003	2003 Jade Solid Gold Top 10 Awards	Best Duet Song	Ho Sum Ho Bo (好心好報) with Stephy Tang	Silver Award	
2004	Metro Showbiz Hit Awards 新城勁爆頒獎禮	Hit Song	大方	Won	
2004	Metro Showbiz Hit Awards 新城勁爆頒獎禮	Hit Duet Song	Ho Ho Lieu Hoi (好好戀愛) with Stephy Tang	Won	
2004	Metro Showbiz Hit Awards 新城勁爆頒獎禮	Hit Popular Male Artist	Alex Fong	Won	
2004	2004 RTHK Top 10 Gold Songs Awards	Top 10 Songs	Ho Ho Lieu Hoi (好好戀愛)	Won	
2004	2004 Jade Solid Gold Top 10 Awards	Best Duet Song	Ho Ho Lieu Hoi (好好戀愛) with Stephy Tang	Won	
2005	Metro Showbiz Hit Awards 新城勁爆頒獎禮	Hit Song	Mr. ABC (ABC 君)	Won	
2005	Metro Showbiz Hit Awards 新城勁爆頒獎禮	Hit Karoke Song	Hurting Yourself, Hurting Others (自欺欺人) with Theresa Fu	Won	
2006	Metro Showbiz Hit Awards 新城勁爆頒獎禮	Hit Song	In Your Distant Vicinity (在你遙遠的附近)	Won	
2006	Metro Showbiz Hit Awards 新城勁爆頒獎禮	Hit Duet Song	Extremely Love (十・分愛) with Stephy Tang	Won	
2006	2006 Jade Solid Gold Top 10 Awards	Best Duet Song	Extreme Love (十分‧愛) with Stephy Tang	Gold Award	
