= Be Good (Alex Fong album) =

Studio album by Alex Fong
- Released: 2005

Alex Fong chronology
Never Walk Alone (2004)	Be Good (2005)	In Your Distant Vicinity (2007)

Be Good is a 2005 album by Alex Fong (方力申). It was a huge success, selling over 100,000 copies, a milestone that the record company celebrated with a party at Empire Centre in Tsim Sha Tsui on 20 June 2005.

== Track listing ==
1. ABC君 (Mr. ABC)
2. 自欺欺人 ft. 傅穎 (Self-Deception)
3. 我們不是朋友 (We Are Not Friends)
4. 密碼 (Password)
5. 石像 (Statue)
6. 自導自戀 (Directing Your Own Love)
7. 好走 (Better Go)
8. 希望我聽錯 (I Hope I Didn't Hear That)
9. 你記得嗎? (Do You Remember?)
10. 幸福家庭 (Happy Family)
