= Miki Yeung =

Hong Kong singer and actress (born 1985)

- Born: 14 February 1985 (age 40); Hong Kong
- Occupations: Singer, actress
- Years active: 2002–present

Chinese name
- Traditional Chinese: 楊愛瑾
- Simplified Chinese: 杨爱瑾
Transcriptions
Standard Mandarin
- Hanyu Pinyin: yang2 ai4 jin3
Yue: Cantonese
- Jyutping: joeng4 ngoi3 gan2
- Musical career
- Origin: Hong Kong
- Genres: Cantopop
- Labels: Gold Label Records
- Formerly of: Cookies

Miki Yeung (born 14 February 1985) is a Hong Kong cantopop singer and actress. In 2002, she joined the cantopop music idol group Cookies. In 2005, her film b420 was awarded the Grand Prix Award: The 19th Fukuoka Asian Film Festival. Currently she is the TV hostess of the programme Love Academy for the J2 channel. In 2012, she signed an artiste contract with TVB.

== Discography ==
=== As part of Cookies ===
Album #	Album Information
1st	Happy Birthday: Released: April 2002; Label: EMI Hong Kong
2nd	Merry Christmas: Release Date: 23 December 2002; Label: EMI Hong Kong

=== As part of Mini Cookies ===
Album #	Album Information
3rd	All The Best: Released: 13 August 2003; Label: EMI Hong Kong
4th	4 Play: Release Date: January 2004; Label: EMI Hong Kong
5th	4 in Love: Release Date: 17 December 2004; Label: EMI Hong Kong
6th	903 California Red: Eleven Fires Concert(11團火音樂會): Release Date: October 2004; Label: EMI Hong Kong

== Filmography ==
Year	Name	Role
2002	Nine Girls and A Ghost 九個女仔一隻鬼	
2003	Feel 100% 2003 百分百感覺 2003	Jackie
2004	Dumplings 三更2 餃子	Kate
2004	Split Second (TV series) 爭分奪秒	Fung Mei Yun
2005	Dragon Reloaded 龍咁威II 之 皇母娘娘呢?	Miki
2005	b420	Koey
2006	McDull, The Alumni 春田花花同學會	
2006	Undercover Hidden Dragon 至尊無賴	Sa
2006	Dating a Vampire 愛上屍新娘	Jade
2006	Love @ First Note 戀愛初歌	Mini
2006	Fatal Contact 黑拳	Siu Tin
2007	Love Is Not All Around 十分愛	Mon
2007	It's a Wonderful Life 心想事成	
2008	L for Love L for Lies 我的最愛	Ah Min
2008	Fate 阿飛	
2008	Forgive and Forget 親愛的	
2009	Love Connected 保持愛你	Ah Min
2011	Lan Kwai Fong	Ah Milk
2013	Sniper Standoff	
2014	Hello Babies	
2015	Zai Jian Wo Men De Shi Nian	
