= Lolli =

Lolli is an Italian surname. Notable people with the surname include:

- Alberto Carlo Lolli (born c.1876), Italian film director of the silent era
- Antonio Lolli (1725–1802), Italian violinist and composer
- Anthony Lolli, developer and founder of the Brooklyn-based brokerage firm Rapid Realty
- Claudio Lolli (1950–2018), Italian singer-songwriter
- David Lolli (1825–1884), Italian physician
- Giambattista Lolli (1698–1769), Italian chess player
- Nicolò Lolli (born 1994), Italian professional footballer
- Tommaso Lolli (died 1667), Italian Roman Catholic prelate

== See also ==
- "Lolli Lolli (Pop That Body)", a song by Three 6 Mafia
- Lollipop, a type of confectionery
- Lolly (disambiguation)
- Lally (disambiguation)
- Loli (disambiguation)
