= Hallie (given name) =

- Gender: Female
- Language: English

Origin
- Meaning: English hypocorism of Harriet; variant of Hayley

Other names
- Related names: Hal, Halle, Harriet, Hayley

Hallie is an English feminine given name that originated as a hypocorism for the name Harriet. Young children often have difficulty in pronouncing the letter r, which resulted in nicknames that substitute the letter l for r. Other examples include Dolly for Dorothy, Lolly for Laura, Molly or Polly for Mary, and Sally for Sarah. The name is also occasionally regarded as a variant of Hayley.

== People with the name ==
- Hallie Anderson (1885–1927), American dance orchestra conductor and theater band director
- Hallie Olivere Biden (born 1973), American school counselor and executive
- Hallie Beachem Brooks (1907–1985), African-American academic
- Hallie Quinn Brown (1845–1949), African American educator
- Hallie Buckley, New Zealand bioarchaeologist and professor
- Hallie Champlin (1872–1935), American tennis player
- Hallie Morse Daggett (1878–1964), American woman, first female fire lookout in the United States Forest Service
- Hallie D'Amore (1942–2006), American make-up artist
- Hallie Earle (1880–1963), American physician
- Hallie Eisenberg (born 1992), American actress
- Hallie Ephron (born 1948), American novelist
- Hallie Farmer (1881–1960), American college professor
- Hallie Flanagan (1890–1969), American theatrical producer and director
- Hallie Foote (born 1950), American actress
- Hallie Ford (1905–2007), American business person and philanthropist
- Hallie Haglund (born 1982), American comedy writer
- Hallie Parrish Hinges (1868–1950), American singer
- Hallie Jackson (born 1984), American television news anchor
- Hallie Lieberman, American sex and gender historian
- Hallie Lomax (1915–2011), African American journalist
- Hallie Eustace Miles (1855–1947), writer, restaurateur, and vegetarianism activist
- Hallie Meyers-Shyer (born 1987), American actress and director
- Eliza Hall "Hallie" Nutt Parsley (1842–1920)
- Hallie E. Queen (died 1940), American writer
- Hallie Erminie Rives (1874–1956), American novelist
- Hallie H. Rowe (1896–1992), American politician
- Hallie Rubenhold (born 1971), British-American historian
- Hallie Sargisson (1907–2010), American politician
- Hallie Shoffner (born 1987 or 1988), American farmer, business executive and politician
- Hallie C. Stillwell (1897–1997), American schoolteacher
- Hallie Taufo'ou (born 1994), American rugby union player
- Hallie Todd (born 1964), American actress and producer
- Hallie Paxson Winsborough (1865–1940), American church worker and activist

== Fictional characters ==
- Hallie Takahama, also known as Jolt, a Marvel Comics character

== See also ==
- Hallie (disambiguation)
- Halle (name)
