= Loli =

Loli most often refers to:

- A young or young-looking girl character in Japanese anime and manga; subjects of the lolicon genre

Loli may also refer to:

== People ==
=== Surname ===
- Peter Loli (born 1980), Australian rugby union player
- Silvia Loli, Peruvian politician

=== Given name ===
- Loli Kantor (born 1952), Israeli-American photographer
- Loli Sánchez (born 1964), Spanish former professional basketball player

== Places ==
- Loli (district), in West Sumba Regency, East Nusa Tenggara, Indonesia

== Other ==
- LOLI Database (list of lists), an international chemical regulatory database

== See also ==
- Lolli, an Italian surname
- Lolly (disambiguation)
- Lolita (disambiguation)
