= Lollipop (disambiguation) =

A lollipop is a confectionery product.

Lollipop(s), Lollypop or Lolly Pop may also refer to:

== People ==
- Lollipop (actress) (1970–2008), Italian pornographic actress
- Lollipop (wrestler) (born 1979), a.k.a. Jaime Lynne, American professional wrestler
- Lolly Pop (born 1975), American solo dance-pop artist
- Lollypop Jones (1897–1954), American vaudeville entertainer

== Arts, entertainment, and media ==
=== Music ===
==== Groups ====
- Lollipop (Italian band), an Italian girl group
- The Lollipops, a Danish pop and rock group formed in 1960
- Die Lollipops (The Lollipops), a German children's band
- Lollipop F, formerly Lollipop, a Taiwanese Mandopop boy band

==== Albums ====
- Lollipop (album), a 2011 album by the Meat Puppets
- Lollipop (single album), a 2016 single album by Imfact
- Die Lollipops, an album by the group Die Lollipops

==== Songs ====
- "Lollipop" (1958 song), first recorded by Ronald & Ruby; covered by the Chordettes
- "Lollipop" (BigBang and 2NE1 song), 2009
- "Lollipop" (Darell song), 2023
- "Lollipop" (Lil Wayne song), 2008
- "Lollipop" (Mika song), 2007
- "Lollipop (Candyman)", by Aqua, 1997
- "Lollipop (Param Pam Pam)", by Alexandra Stan, 2009
- "Lollipop", by BoA, 2004
- "Lollipop", by DADA (Matt Schwartz), 2006
- "Lollipop", by Eldzhey and Morgenshtern, 2020
- "Lollipop", by f(x) from Pinocchio, 2011
- "Lollipop", by Kumi Koda from Gossip Candy, 2010
- "Lollipop", by LL Cool J from 10, 2002
- "Lollipop", by Luther Campbell from Somethin' Nasty, 2001
- "Lollipop", by Snoop Dogg from Paid tha Cost to Be da Boss, 2002
- "Lollipop (Ode to Jim)", by Alvvays from Antisocialites, 2017

=== Other arts, entertainment, and media ===
- Lollipop (2008 film), an Indian film
- Lollipop (2024 film), a British drama film
- Lollipop (musical), a 1924 Broadway musical
- Lollipop, a character from the fourth season of Battle for Dream Island, an animated web series

== Computing and technology ==
- Android Lollipop, version 5.x of Google's mobile operating system
- Lollipop sequence numbering, a numbering scheme used in routing protocols
- Lollipop, the name of the symbol (⊸), used to represent linear implication in Linear logic

== Other uses ==
- Chicken lollipop, an hors d'oeuvre
- Crossing guard, often described in the United Kingdom and Australia as a lollipop lady/man
- Lollipop coral, species of tunicate Nephtheis fascicularis

== See also ==
- Lollipopaia, a genus of fungi
- Lolly (disambiguation)
