= Loly =

Loly may refer to:

- Loly Aivirrne, a fictional character from the Bleach anime/manga universe
- Loly Rico (21st century), Salvadoran-Canadian activist
- Loly, -18

== See also ==
- Lolly (disambiguation)
- Lolly (given name)
