= Sally (name) =

- Gender: Feminine
- Language: English

Origin
- Meaning: Hypocorism of Sarah

Sally or Sallie is an English language feminine given name that originated as a hypocorism for Sarah. Young children often have difficulty in pronouncing the letter r, which resulted in nicknames like Sally that substitute the letter r for l. Other examples include Dolly for Dorothy, Hallie for Harriet, Lolly for Laura, and Molly or Polly for Mary. Sally and spelling variant Sallie have also been in use as independent names since the 1700s. The name was popularized by cultural influences in the early 20th century, including the popular Broadway musical Sally, which debuted in 1920. Actress Marilyn Miller played Sally on stage and a 1929 film. An earlier film featured Colleen Moore in the role of Sally. The popularity of performer Sally Rand also increased usage of Sally in the Anglosphere in the 1920s and 1930s. In the United States, the name was among the top 100 names for American girls until 1956. It reached the peak of its popularity in 1939, when it was the 52nd most popular name for American girls. It then declined in use, but had a brief increase in use in the late 1970s due to the influence of the American actress Sally Field. It is also a nickname for Salome and Salimeh, which are especially popular in the Eurasian country Georgia.

== People ==
- Sally Amaki, American singer based in Japan
- Sally Armstrong (journalist) (born 1943), Canadian journalist, documentary filmmaker and human rights activist
- Sally Baddock, New Zealand academic in the field of midwifery
- Sally A. Bailie (1937–1995), American race-horse trainer and owner
- Sally Barrington, British oncologist and medical researcher
- Sally Barton (born 1957), Gibraltar cricketer
- Sally Belfrage (1936–1994), United States–born British-based 20th century nonfiction writer and international journalist
- Sally Anne Bowman (1987–2005), British murder victim
- Sally Boyden (cyclist) (born 1967), British track and road racing cyclist
- Sally Boyden (singer) (born 1966), Australian singer and actor
- Sally Bretton, British actress
- Sally Carr (born 1945), Scottish singer, lead singer of the 1970s pop group Middle of the Road (band)
- Sally Clark (disambiguation)
- Sally Cluchey, American politician
- Sally Cockburn, Canadian-American mathematician
- Sally Cookson, British theatre director
- Sally Coulthard (born 1974), British author
- Sally Darr (1923–2023), American chef
- Sally Davies (artist) (born 1956), Canadian painter and photographer, based in New York City
- Dame Sally Claire Davies (born 1949), British doctor and government health advisor
- Sally Dexter (born 1960), British actress
- Sally Douglas (1941–2001), British actress
- Sally Ward Lawrence Hunt Armstrong Downs, also known as Sallie Ward, (1827–1896), American socialite
- Sally Dynevor (born 1963), British actress
- Sally Field (born 1946), American actress
- Sally Gunnell (born 1966), British hurdler
- Sally Hawkins (born 1976), British actress
- Sally Hemings (c. 1773–1835), slave owned by Thomas Jefferson, believed to have had six children by him
- Sally Hill, New Zealand academic
- Sally Horner (1937–1952), American formerly missing girl
- Sally Ann Howes (1930–2021), British-American singer and actress
- Sally Hudson-Beck (born 1953), Zimbabwean tennis player
- Sarah "Sallie" A. Hughes (1847–1916), American preacher
- Sally James (presenter) (born 1950), British TV presenter
- Sally Jenkins (born 1960), American author and sports journalist
- Sally-Anne Jones (1968–2017), British-born terrorist and UN-designated recruiter who is believed to have been killed
- Sally Jones, British journalist
- Sally Kellerman (1937–2022), American actress and singer
- Sally Chepyego Kaptich (born 1985), Kenyan distance runner
- Sally Kirkland (born 1941), American actress
- Sally Kohn (born 1977), American political commentator
- Sally Kosgei, Kenyan politician
- Sally Liu, Chinese singer and member of South Korean girl group Gugudan
- Sally Mann (born 1951), American photographer
- Sally Ann Matthews, (born 1970), British actress
- Sally Milgrim, (1898–1994), American fashion designer
- Sally Morgan (artist) (born 1951), Australian Aboriginal author, scriptwriter and artist
- Sally Morgan, Baroness Morgan of Huyton (born 1959), British politician
- Sally Morgan (psychic), British celebrity psychic
- Sally Newmarch (born 1975), Australian Olympic rower
- Sally Jessy Raphael (born 1935), host of the American talk show Sally
- Sally Pearson (born 1986), Australian track and field athlete
- Sally Phillips (born 1969), British actress
- Sally Poh (1956–1998), Singaporean beautician and robbery-murder victim
- Sally Pressman (born 1981), American actress
- Sally Priesand (born 1946), America's first female rabbi ordained by a rabbinical seminary
- Sally Rand (1904–1979), American burlesque performer
- Sally Reid, Scottish actress
- Sally Ride (1951–2012), American physicist and astronaut
- Sally Ronk (1912–1986), American economist
- Sally Rooney (born 1991), Irish author
- Sally Salminen (1906–1976), Finnish writer
- Sally Seymour (died 1824), American pastry chef and restaurateur
- Sally Shaw (born 1978), Australian cricketer
- Sally Smith (disambiguation)
- Sally Snodgrass (1936–2022), American politician
- Sally Hoyt Spofford (1914–2002), American ornithologist
- Sally Struthers (born 1947), American actress and spokeswoman
- Sally The Farmer's Daughter, stage name of Beckie Mullen, professional wrestler from the Gorgeous Ladies of Wrestling
- Sally Thomas (born 1939), Australian judge
- Sally Thomas (powerlifter) (born 1970), Canadian para-powerlifter
- Sally Ann Triplett (born 1962), British actress and singer
- Sally Willington (1931–2008), English activist, artist and potter
- Sally Wister (1761–1804), American diarist
- Sally Yates (born 1960), American lawyer and former acting U.S. Attorney General
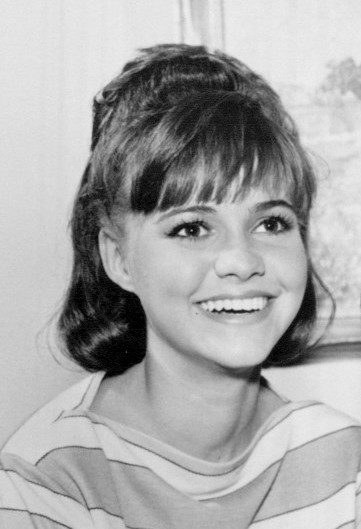
Sally Field is among the most famous people named Sally

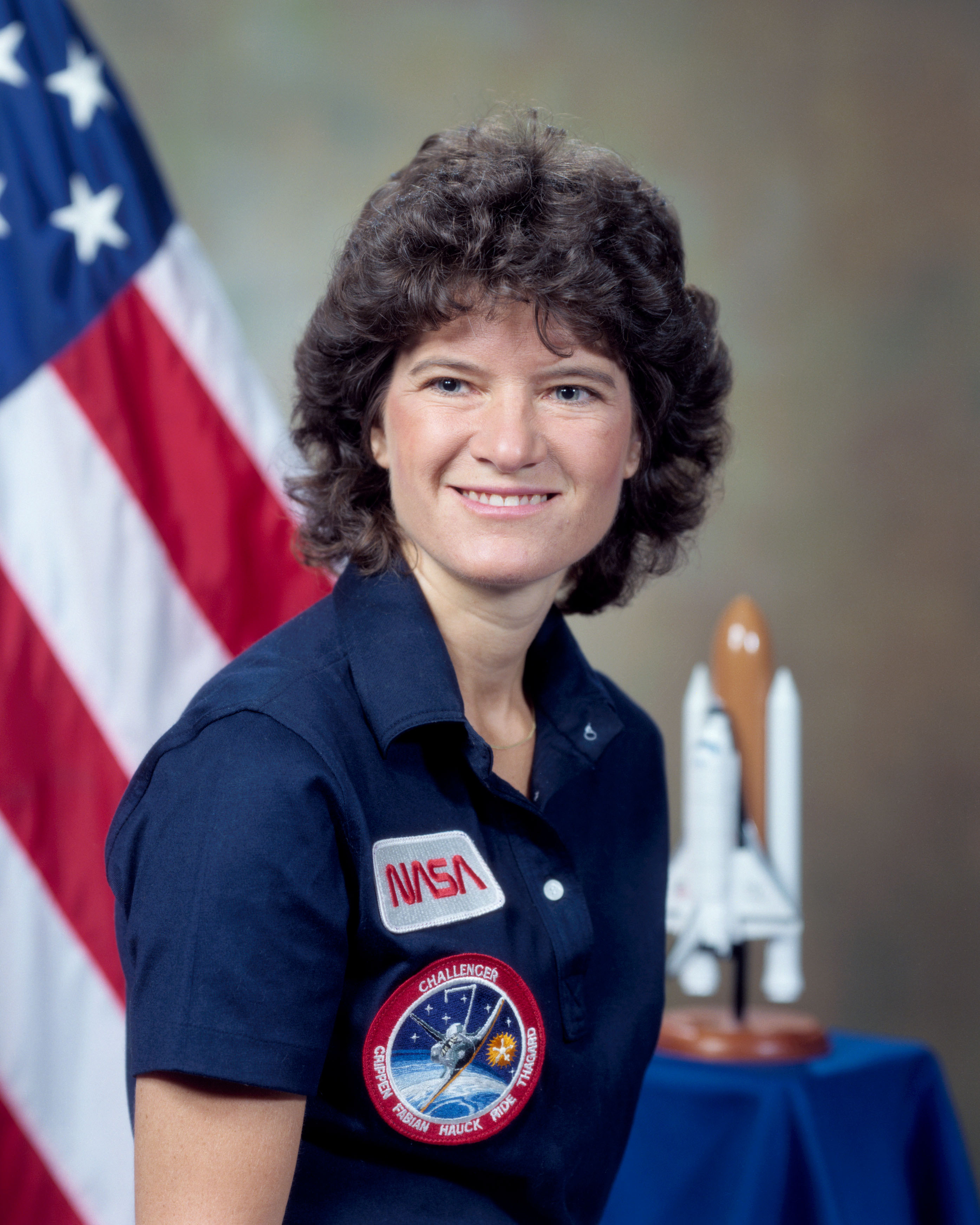
Sally Ride was the first American female astronaut

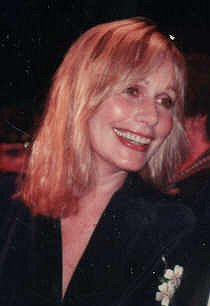
Actress Sally Kellerman

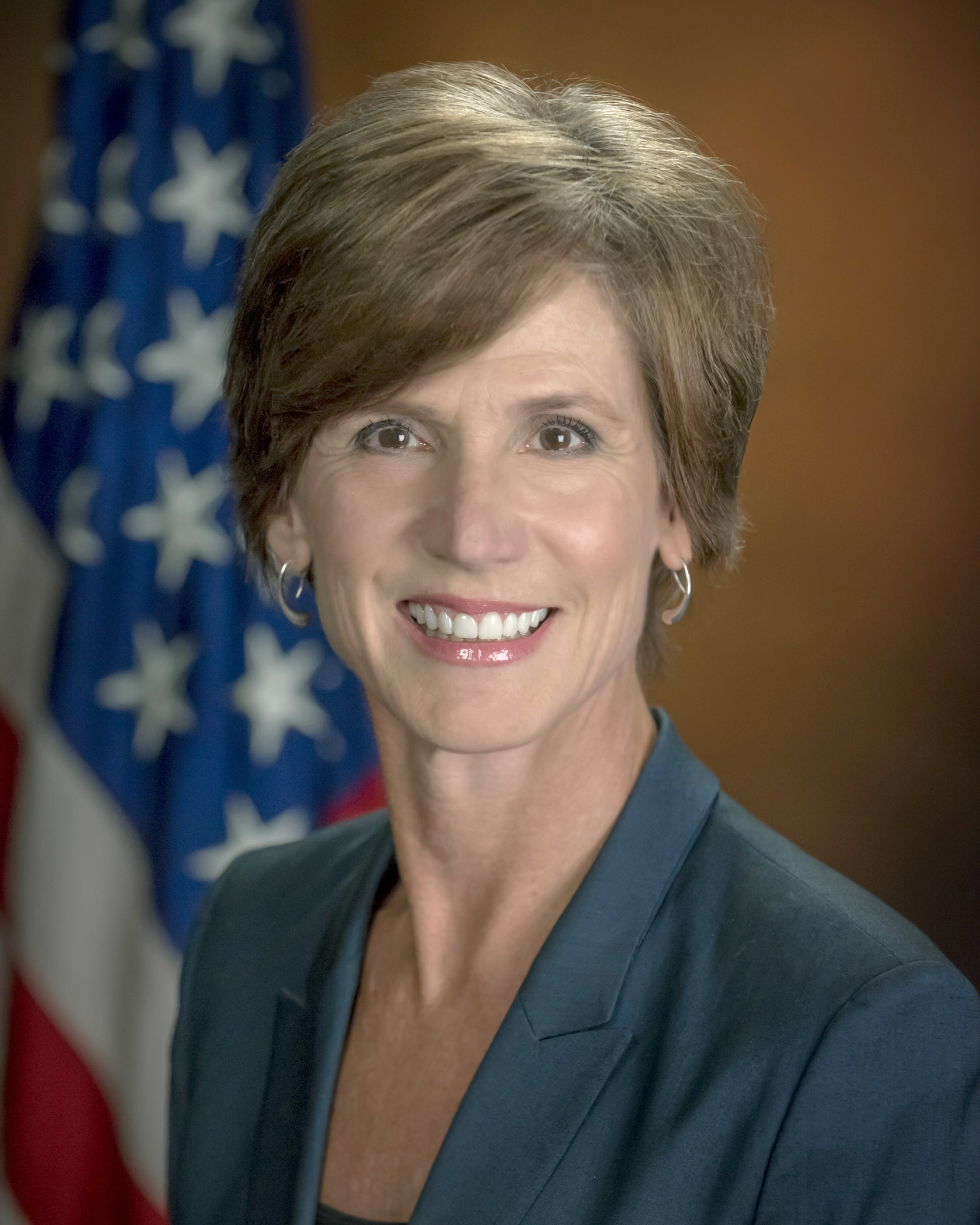
Former acting U.S. Attorney General Sally Yates

== Fictional characters ==
- Sally, the subject and partial narrator in some versions of the English folk song "Hares on the Mountain"
- Sally, a character in the 1986 American science fiction comedy horror movie Critters
- "Mustang Sally" (song), R&B song about a Sally who rides
- Princess Sally Acorn, from the American Sonic the Hedgehog cartoon and comic book
- Sally, a character on the TV sitcom Soap
- Sally, a character in the 1981 American slasher movie The Prowler
- Sally Solomon, a character in the television show 3rd Rock from the Sun
- The title character of Sally the Witch, a Japanese manga and anime series
- Sally (Black Clover), a character in the manga series Black Clover
- Sally, a character in the 1993 American stop-motion animated musical dark fantasy movie The Nightmare Before Christmas
- Sally Albright, a title character from When Harry Met Sally..., a 1989 American romantic comedy film
- Sally Avril (Bluebird), a Marvel Comics character
- Sally Bains, a character from the 1985 American science fiction movie Back to the Future
- Sally Blevins (Skids), a Marvel Comics mutant character
- The title character of Sally Bollywood: Super Detective, a 2009 cartoon series
- Sally Bowles, a cabaret singer in Christopher Isherwood's Goodbye to Berlin and the musical Cabaret
- Sally Brown, Charlie Brown's little sister in the comic strip Peanuts
- Sally Brooks, a character on This Is Us
- Sally Carrera, an anthropomorphic character based on a Porsche 911 Carrera in the Pixar's Cars franchise
- Sally Day, a character from the 1986 film Demons 2
- Sally Draper, a character from the American period drama Mad Men
- Sally Fletcher, from the Australian soap opera Home and Away
- Sally Floyd, a journalist character from Marvel Comics
- The title character of Sally Forth (syndicated strip), a comic strip
- The title character of Sally Forth (Wally Wood) (1968–1974), a comic strip created by Wally Wood
- Sally Hansen, a character from the stop motion animated Christian series Davey and Goliath
- Sally Hardeman, a character in the 1978 American romantic drama movie The Betsy
- Sally Hardesty, fictional character in The Texas Chainsaw Massacre franchise
- Sally Jackson, the mortal mother of demigod Percy Jackson in Rick Riordan's Percy Jackson and the Olympians and Heroes of Olympus
- Sally Jones/Alison Page, a character in the 1997 American martial arts comedy movie Beverly Hills Ninja
- Sally Lockhart, in a series of books by Philip Pullman
- Sally Metzner, a character from the 1997 film Jack Frost
- Sally Miles, a character in the 1981 American satirical black comedy movie S.O.B.
- Sally Rogers, a main character in The Dick Van Dyke Show, portrayed by Rose Marie
- Sally Simpson, from the musical Tommy
- Sally Syrup, Flapjack’s girlfriend from The Marvelous Misadventures of Flapjack
- Sally, a fictional character in the animated series Scaredy Squirrel
- Sally Tomato, a mobster in Sing Sing from Breakfast at Tiffany's
- Sally (film series), an antisemitic stereotype from the 1910s, played by Ernst Lubitsch
- Sally Webster, from the British soap opera Coronation Street
- Sally the Witch, the main character in self-titled series
