= Serial number =

Unique code assigned for identification of a single unit

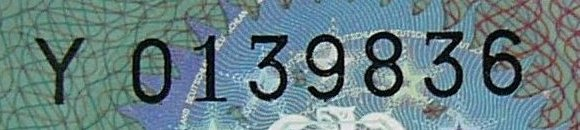
Serial number from an identity document

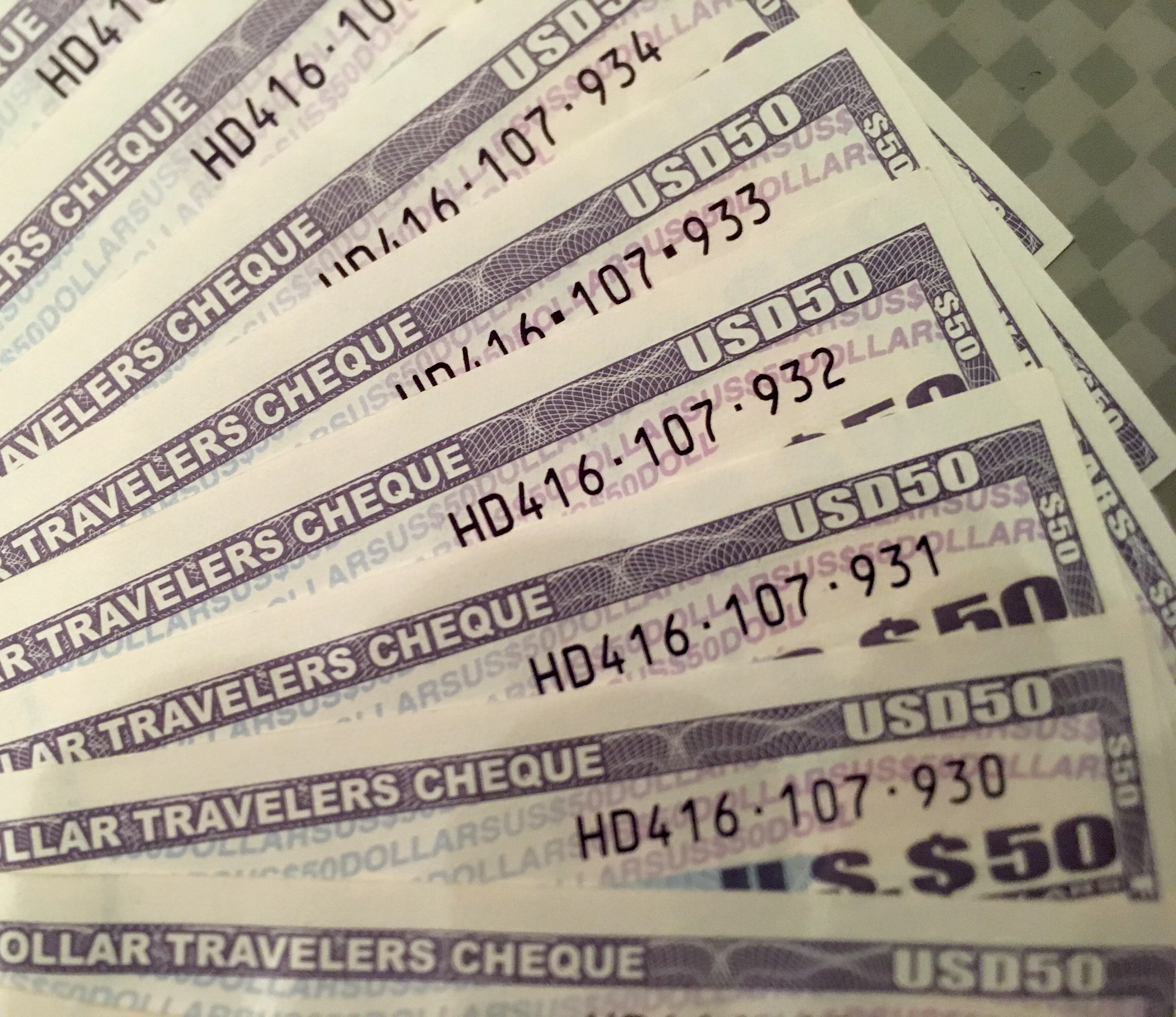
Traveller's cheques, a kind of insured cash money in form of a paper cheque, are sold to customers in sets having consecutive numbers - one of the very few type of items where consumers have access to "serialized" similar things.

A serial number (SN) is a unique identifier used to uniquely identify an item, and is usually assigned incrementally or sequentially.

Despite being called serial "numbers", they do not need to be strictly numerical and may contain letters and other typographical symbols, or may consist entirely of a character string.

== Applications of serial numbering ==
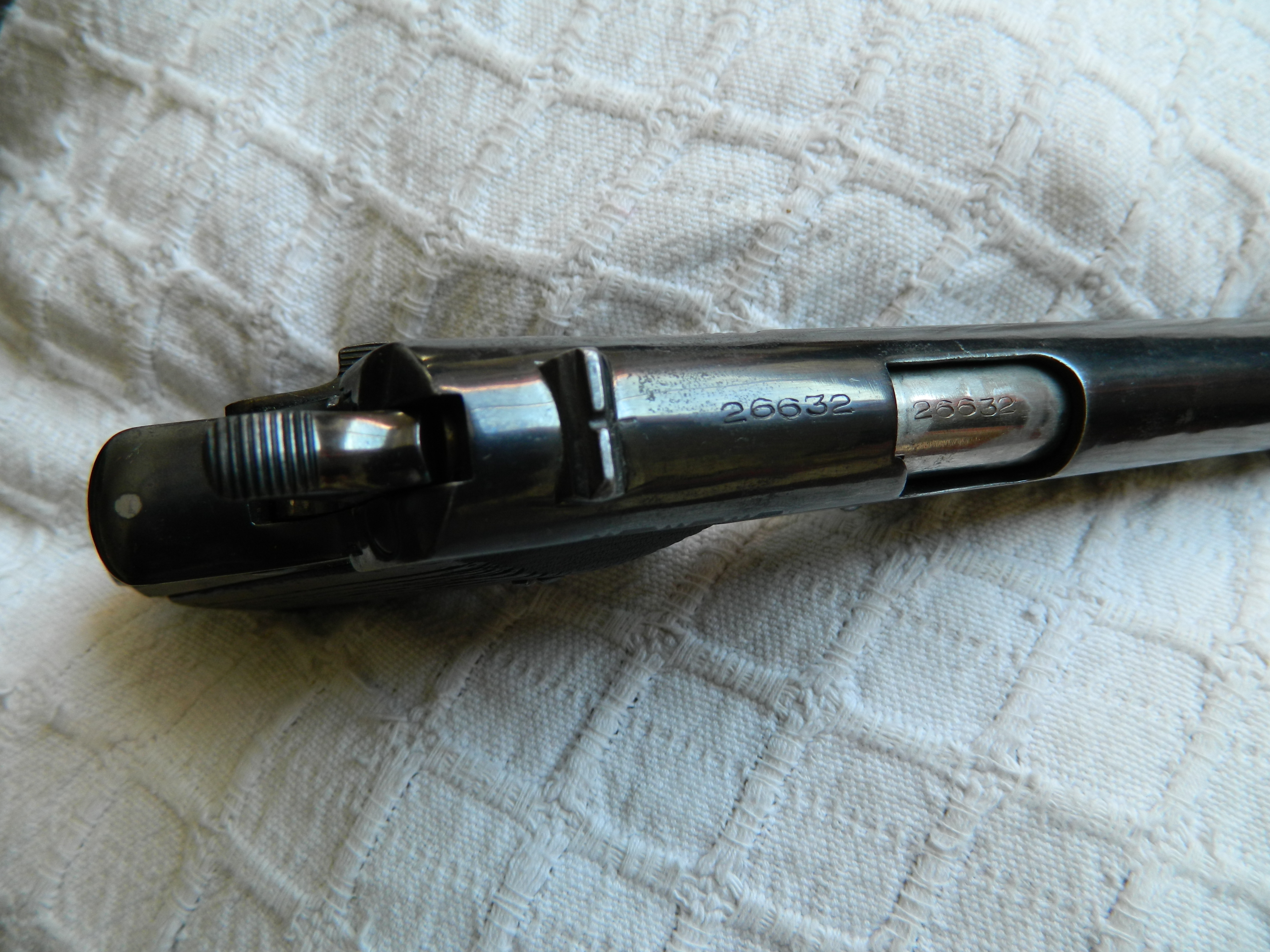
Serial number on a Ballester–Molina semi-automatic pistol

Serial numbers identify otherwise identical individual units, thereby serving various practical uses. Serial numbers are a deterrent against theft and counterfeit products, as they can be recorded, and stolen or otherwise irregular goods can be identified. Banknotes and other transferable documents of value bear serial numbers to assist in preventing counterfeiting and tracing stolen ones.

They are valuable in quality control, as once a defect is found in the production of a particular batch of product, the serial number will identify which units are affected. Some items with serial numbers are automobiles, firearms, electronics, and appliances.

== Smartphones and other smart devices ==
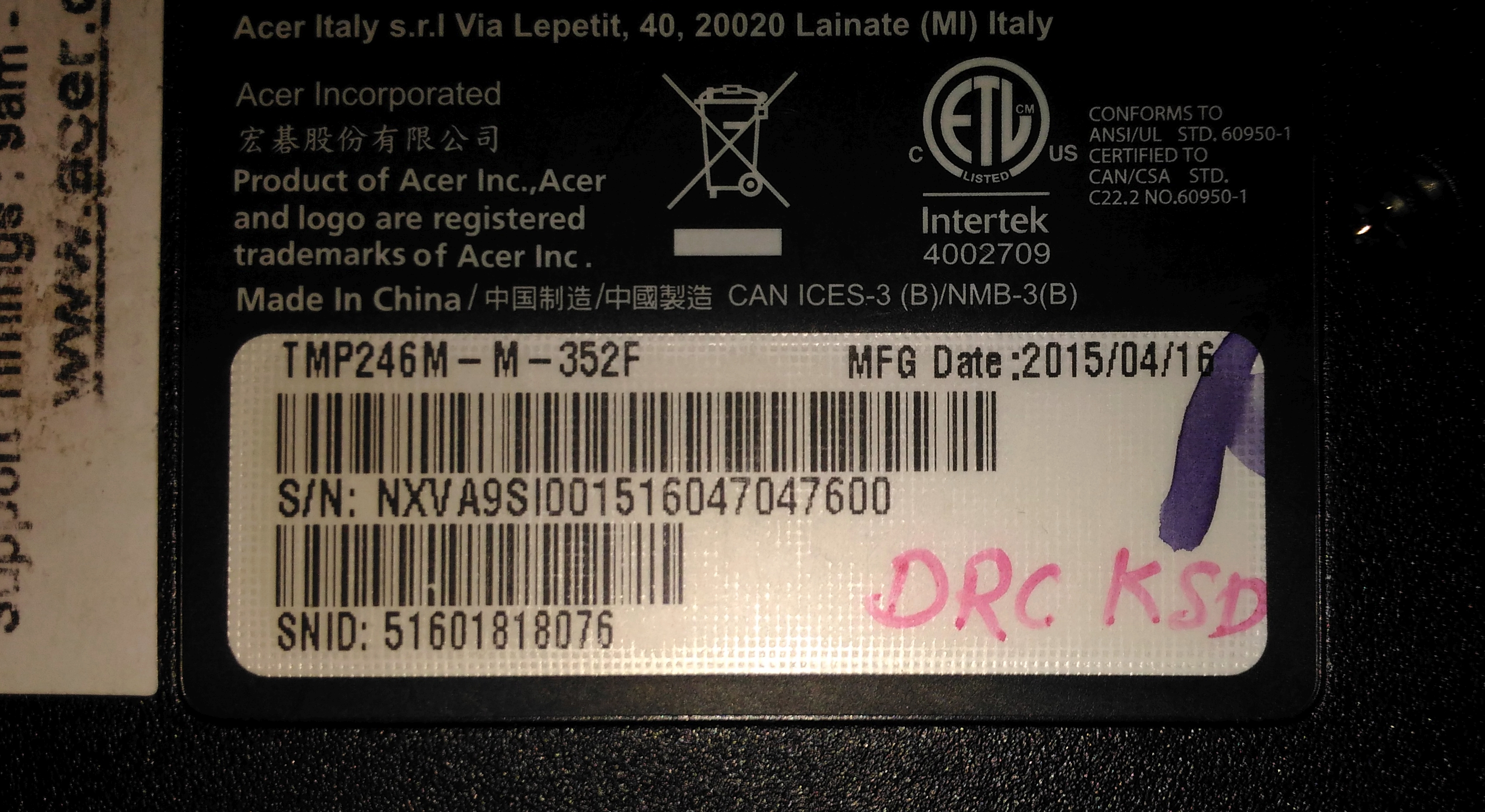
Serial number of a laptop computer

In smartphones, serial numbers are extended to the integrated components in addition to the electronic device as a whole, also known as serialization. This gives unique individual parts such as the screen, battery, chip and camera a separate serial number. This is queried by the software for proper release for use. This practice by manufacturers limits the serial number electronic devices.

=== Serial numbers for intangible goods ===
Serial numbers may be used to identify individual physical or intangible objects; for example, computer software or the right to play an online multiplayer game. The purpose and application is different. A software serial number, otherwise called a product key, is usually not embedded in the software but is assigned to a specific user with a right to use the software. The software will function only if a potential user enters a valid product code. The vast majority of possible codes are rejected by the software. If an unauthorized user is found to be using the software, the legitimate user can be identified from the code. It is usually not impossible, however, for an unauthorized user to create a valid but unallocated code either by trying many possible codes, or reverse engineering the software; use of unallocated codes can be monitored if the software makes an Internet connection.

== Other uses of the term ==
The term serial number is sometimes used for codes which do not identify a single instance of something. For example, the International Standard Serial Number or ISSN used on magazines, journals and other periodicals, an equivalent to the International Standard Book Number (ISBN) applied to books, is assigned to each periodical. It takes its name from the library science use of the word serial to mean a periodical.

Certificates and certificate authorities (CA) are necessary for widespread use of cryptography. These depend on applying mathematically rigorous serial numbers and serial number arithmetic, again not identifying a single instance of the content being protected.

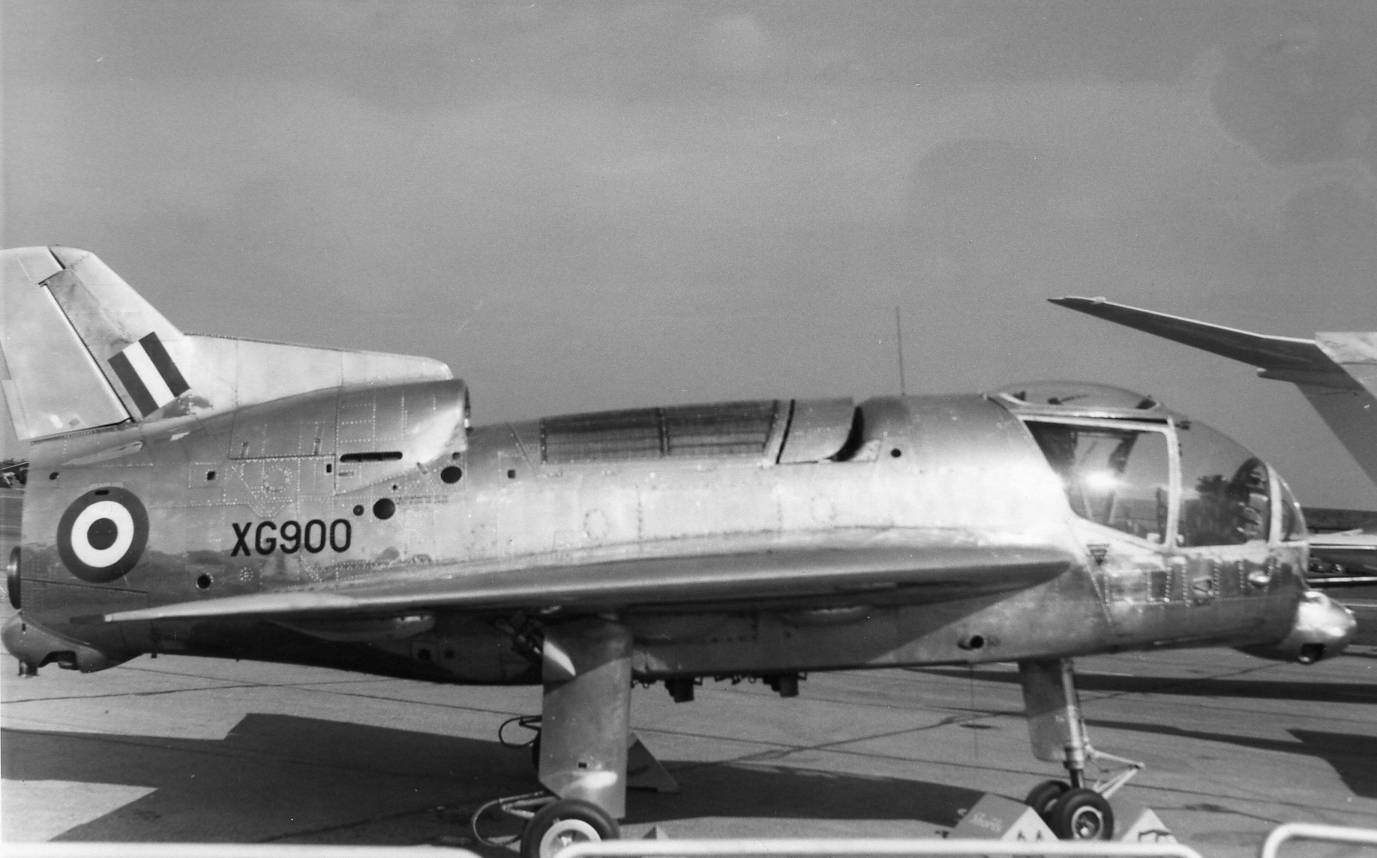
The RAF serial (XG900) on the Short SC.1

=== Military and government use ===
The term serial number is also used in military formations as an alternative to the expression service number. In air forces, the serial number is used to uniquely identify individual aircraft and is usually painted on both sides of the aircraft fuselage, most often in the tail area, although in some cases the serial is painted on the side of the aircraft's fin/rudder(s). Because of this, the serial number is sometimes called a tail number.

In the UK Royal Air Force (RAF) the individual serial takes the form of two letters followed by three digits, e.g., BT308—the prototype Avro Lancaster, or XS903—an English Electric Lightning F.6 at one time based at RAF Binbrook. During the Second World War RAF aircraft that were secret or carrying secret equipment had "/G" (for "Guard") appended to the serial, denoting that the aircraft was to have an armed guard at all times while on the ground, e.g., LZ548/G—the prototype de Havilland Vampire jet fighter, or ML926/G—a de Havilland Mosquito XVI experimentally fitted with H2S radar. Prior to this scheme the RAF, and predecessor Royal Flying Corps (RFC), utilized a serial consisting of a letter followed by four figures, e.g., D8096—a Bristol F.2 Fighter currently owned by the Shuttleworth Collection, or K5054—the prototype Supermarine Spitfire. The serial number follows the aircraft throughout its period of service.

In 2009, the U.S. FDA published draft guidance for the pharmaceutical industry to use serial numbers on prescription drug packages. This measure is intended to enhance the traceability of drugs and to help prevent counterfeiting. The FDA also required a serial number or lot number to be added to breast implants.

== Serial number arithmetic ==
Serial numbers are often used in network protocols. However, most sequence numbers in computer protocols are limited to a fixed number of bits, and will wrap around after sufficiently many numbers have been allocated. Thus, recently allocated serial numbers may duplicate very old serial numbers, but not other recently allocated serial numbers. To avoid ambiguity with these non-unique numbers, RFC 1982 "Serial Number Arithmetic", defines special rules for calculations involving these kinds of serial numbers.

Lollipop sequence number spaces are a more recent and sophisticated scheme for dealing with finite-sized sequence numbers in protocols.

== See also ==
- Engine number – Identification number marked on an engine
- English numerals – Names of numbers in English
- Numbering scheme – System of rules for assigning mathematical values to database items
- Part number – Identifier of a particular part design in engineering
- Product key – Specific software-based key for a computer program
- Sequence number – Mathematical concept
- SQL – Relational database programming language (serial identifiers for databases)
- United Kingdom military aircraft registration number – Identification for United Kingdom military aircraft
- United States military aircraft serial numbers
- Vehicle identification number – System for identifying vehicles
- Arithmometer – 19th-century mechanical calculator patented by French inventor Thomas de Colmar – one of the first machines to sport a unique serial number

== Sources ==
- Elz, R., and R. Bush, RFC 1982 "Serial Number Arithmetic", Network Working Group, August 1996.
- Plummer, William W. "Sequence Number Arithmetic". Cambridge, Massachusetts: Bolt Beranek and Newman, Inc., 21 September 1978.
