= Halle (name) =

Halle is both a given name and a surname. Notable people with the name include:

== People with the given name ==
- Halle Bailey (born 2000), American singer, part of the duo Chloe x Halle
- Halle Berry (born 1966), American actress
- Halle Butler (born 1985), American author
- Halle Cioffi (born 1969), American tennis player
- Halle Jørn Hanssen (born 1937), Norwegian politician and journalist
- Halle Hazzard (born 1999), Grenadian sprinter
- Halle Hilton (born 2004), British/Irish artistic gymnast
- Halle Houssein (born 2004), English footballer
- Halle Janemar (1920–2016), Swedish speed skater
- Halle Mordu (born 1986), Nigerian actress, singer-songwriter and dancer
- Halle Pratt (born 1999), Canadian synchronized swimmer
- Halle Tanner (1864–1901), American physician
- Halle Tecco, American investor
- Halle Williams (born 2000), English singer

== People with the surname ==
- Aaron Halle-Wolfssohn (1754–1835), German Jewish scholar
- Adam de la Halle (1245–50 – 1285–8/after 1306), French-born trouvère, poet and musician
- Barthold Halle (1925–2025), Norwegian stage instructor and theatre director
- Bruce Halle (1930–2018), American entrepreneur and businessman
- Charles Hallé (1819–1895), German pianist and conductor
- Charles Edward Hallé (1846–1914), English painter and gallery manager
- Claude-Guy Hallé (1652–1736), French painter
- Daniel Hallé (1614–1675), French painter
- Egil Halle (1918–1988), Norwegian resistance member
- Einar Halle (born 1943), Norwegian footballer and referee
- Elinor Hallé (1856–1926), English sculptor and inventor
- Francis Hallé (1938–2025), French botanist and biologist
- Gunnar Halle (born 1965), Norwegian footballer
- Gunnar Halle (officer) (1907–1986), Norwegian military officer
- Hiram Halle (1867–1944), American businessman, inventor, and philanthropist
- Jan Halle (1903–1986), Dutch footballer
- Jean Noël Hallé (1754–1822), French physician
- John Halle (disambiguation), various people
- Kay Halle (1904–1997), American journalist, author, radio broadcaster, and department store heiress
- Leo Halle (1906–1992), Dutch footballer
- Louis J. Halle, Jr. (1910–1998), American author and professor of international studies
- Martin Halle (born 1981), Danish former footballer
- Maurice Hallé (1906–1991), Canadian politician
- Morris Halle (1923–2018), Latvian-American linguist
- Morten Halle (born 1957), Norwegian jazz musician, composer and music arranger
- Noël Hallé (1711–1781), French painter
- Per Halle (born 1949), Norwegian long distance runner
- Ranik Halle (1905–1987), Norwegian newspaper editor and bridge player
- Salmon Portland Chase Halle (1866–1949), American businessman and philanthropist
- Sophus Halle (1862–1924), Danish composer

== See also ==
- Halle
- Hallie (given name)
