= Lillian Haydon Childress Hall =

African American librarian

- Born: February 24, 1889; Louisville, Kentucky, U.S.
- Died: April 23, 1958 (aged 69); Indianapolis, Indiana, U.S.
- Burial place: Crown Hill Cemetery and Arboretum, Section 98, Lot 1472; 39.8145345°N 86.1708543°W
- Education: Berea College; Fisk University; Indiana University
- Occupation: Librarian

Lillian Haydon Childress Hall (February 24, 1889 – April 23, 1958) was an American librarian. Hall was the first professionally trained African American librarian in Indiana and the first African American to graduate from the Indiana state library school.

== Early life and education ==
Lillian Sunshine Haydon was born February 24, 1889, in Louisville, Kentucky.

She attended Berea College's normal school, graduating in 1904. She earned a degree in education from Fisk University in Nashville, Tennessee, in 1910.

Hall was admitted to the Indiana Public Library Commission Summer School for Librarians (later the Indiana University School of Library and Information Science) in 1915, becoming the first African American to graduate from the school.

== Career as librarian ==
The Cherry Street Library was a racially segregated branch of the Evansville Public Library which had opened in November 1914; it was a Carnegie library and the "first free public library built north of the Ohio River exclusively for African Americans." Hall started working as an apprentice to the branch manager of the library in January 1915. After receiving her librarian's degree that July, she was promoted to become the branch librarian of the Cherry Street Library. She worked to provide outreach to the community, including inviting teachers to visit the library and starting clubs for boys and girls.

In 1921, Hall was offered a management position at the Indianapolis Public Library's first branch in an African American neighborhood, the Martindale-Brightwood area. The library's Paul Laurence Dunbar Branch was located in a room inside an elementary school for African American children.

Hall resigned her job at the Dunbar branch to accept a new position at Indianapolis's Crispus Attucks High School in 1927. The Indianapolis Public Library opened a new branch at the high school, where Hall was appointed to serve as head librarian.

Hall retired in September 1956 after working for 29 years at Attucks High School.

== Personal life ==
Hall married William H. Childress in 1910; after being widowed in 1919, she went on to marry John Wesley Hall in 1929. Her only child, William Hobbs Childress Jr. (1911–1993), served one term in the Kentucky General Assembly.

She died in Indianapolis on April 23, 1958, and was buried in Crown Hill Cemetery (Section 98, Lot 1472).

== Legacy ==
Hall was widely regarded as a trailblazer among African Americans in librarianship, especially for the library assistants she mentored, including Hallie Beachem Brooks. She built a strong collection of books by and about African Americans for the use of her patrons during her career.
