= Barbara Galland =

Paediatric sleep researcher in New Zealand

- Born: Barbara Galland

Academic background
- Education: University of Otago

Barbara Carolyn Galland is a New Zealand academic specializing in paediatric sleep health. She is a professor in the Department of Women's and Children's Health at the University of Otago.

== Academic career ==
Galland completed her PhD thesis in the department of pharmacology at the University of Otago Medical School in 1989. The thesis was titled Bronchial Hyperreactivity in the Guinea-pig.

Galland heads the Paediatric Sleep Research Group at the University of Otago. Her research focus is the effect of sleep and breathing disorders in children and adolescents on behaviour, cognition, and academic performance. She is also interested in the role of sleep in overweight and obesity, sleep disturbances in children with type 1 diabetes, and the biological mechanisms of Sudden Unexpected Death in Infancy.

Galland is the co-chair of the Paediatric Council of the Australasian Sleep Association and is also on the editorial boards of Sleep Medicine Reviews and Behavioral Sleep Medicine.

== Selected works ==
- Galland, B. C., Taylor, B. J., Elder, D. E., & Herbison, P. (2012). Normal sleep patterns in infants and children: a systematic review of observational studies. Sleep Medicine Reviews, 16 (3), 213–222. doi.org/10.1016/j.smrv.2011.06.001
- Matricciani L. Paquet C. Galland B. Short M. & Olds T. (2019). Children's sleep and health: A meta-review. Sleep Medicine Reviews 46 136–150. doi.org/10.1016/j.smrv.2019.04.011
- Tan, E., Healey, D., Gray, A.R., & Galland B. (2012) Sleep hygiene intervention for youth aged 10 to 18 years with problematic sleep: a before-after pilot study. BMC Pediatrics 12, 189. doi:10.1186/1471-2431-12-189
