= The Vengeance of Jago =

- Directed by: Alberto Carlo Lolli
- Production company: Aquila Films
- Distributed by: Aquila Films
- Release date: April 1912
- Country: Italy
- Languages: Silent; Italian intertitles

The Vengeance of Jago (Italian:Lo spettro di Jago) is a 1912 Italian silent film directed by Alberto Carlo Lolli. It was an early hit for the Aquila Films company.

== Bibliography ==
- Abel, Richard. Encyclopedia of Early Cinema. Taylor & Francis, 2005.
