= Michael V Vitiello =

American researcher, academic and professor

- Born: Brooklyn, New York
- Occupations: Researcher, educator, academic, professor

Academic background
- Education: AB in Psychology; Ph.D in Physiological Psychology
- Alma mater: Columbia College, Columbia University; University of Washington

Academic work
- Institutions: University of Washington

Michael V Vitiello is an American researcher, academic and professor. He is Professor of Psychiatry and Behavioral Sciences at University of Washington. He is the Editor-in-Chief of Sleep Medicine Reviews as well as the Adjunct Professor of Gerontology and Geriatric Medicine, Adjunct Professor of Biobehavioral Nursing and Health Systems, and Co-Director of the Northwest Geriatrics Workforce Enhancement Center (NW GWEC), University of Washington.
