= Four Dimensions (Lollipop F album) =

- Four Dimensions cover

Studio album 四度空間 by Lollipop F
- Released: 6 November 2010
- Genre: Mandopop
- Language: Mandarin
- Label: Gold Typhoon (Taiwan)

Lollipop F chronology
卒業紀念限定盤 (2009)	Four Dimensions (2010)	DANCE (2011)

Four Dimensions (Chinese: 四度空間) is Taiwanese Mandopop quartet boyband Lollipop F's fourth studio Mandarin album. It was released on 6 November 2010 by Gold Typhoon (Taiwan). This album is the group's first release after changing their name from "Lollipop" to "Lollipop F", in October 2010, and the departure of two members.

The title track "Four Dimensions" (四度空間) is listed at number 76 on Hit Fm Taiwan's Hit Fm Annual Top 100 Singles Chart (Hit-Fm年度百首單曲) for 2010. The album was awarded one of the Top 10 Selling Mandarin Albums of the Year at the 2010 IFPI Hong Kong Album Sales Awards, presented by the Hong Kong branch of IFPI.

== Album ==
The band Lollipop F had gone to Hong Kong and Korea, shooting to create a new look for the new album they first released officially after two members of their group left and after they changed their band name. The recording company had spent around 200 million NT and 48 hours around the clock on shooting the music video for the title track "Four Dimensions" (四度空間), they had also spent another NT$200 million on some of the clothing for shooting other music videos in the album.

== Track listing ==
No.	Title	Length
1.	"肆無忌憚"
2.	"四度空間" (Four Dimensions)
3.	"最佳男配角" (Best Supporting Actor)
4.	"攻心計 (feat. 陳妍希)"
5.	"今天是Holiday" (Today is Holiday)
6.	"Here We Come"
7.	"嘻哈人生" (Hip Hop life)
8.	"放空" (Let Go)
9.	"不要就不要" (It's Not)
10.	"勁量愛" (Love Battle)
