= Sally Baddock =

New Zealand academic

- Born: Sally Baddock

Academic background
- Education: University of Otago

Sally Anne Baddock is a New Zealand academic in the field of midwifery, and is a professor in the School of Midwifery at Otago Polytechnic.

== Academic career ==
Baddock completed a PhD titled Bedsharing vs cot-sleeping: an investigation of the physiology and behaviour of infants in the home setting in 2004 at the University of Otago.

Baddock's research focuses on infant behaviour and physiology during sleep and the impact of sleep practices on sudden unexpected death in infancy. She has studied the benefits and risks of bed-sharing between infants and adults and participated in four major studies on infant sleep.

Baddock is a reviewer for the New Zealand College of Midwives Journal. She served as associate head of the School of Midwifery at Otago Polytechnic for seven years.

== Selected works ==
- Davis, Deborah; Sally Baddock; Sally Pairman; Hunter, Marion; Benn, Cheryl; Don Wilson; Dixon, Lesley; Herbison, Peter Graham (2011). "Planned place of birth in New Zealand: does it affect mode of birth and intervention rates among low-risk women?". Birth. 38 (2): 111–119. doi:10.1111/j.1523-536x.2010.00458.x. PMID 21599733. Wikidata Q60492855.
- Davis, Deborah; Sally Baddock; Sally Pairman; Hunter, Marion; Benn, Cheryl; Jacqui Anderson; Dixon, Lesley; Herbison, Peter Graham (2012). "Risk of severe postpartum hemorrhage in low-risk childbearing women in new zealand: exploring the effect of place of birth and comparing third stage management of labor". Birth. 39 (2): 98–105. doi:10.1111/j.1523-536x.2012.00531.x. PMID 23281857. Wikidata Q45744846.
- Sally A Baddock; Galland, Barbara Carolyn; David P G Bolton; Williams, Sheila M.; Taylor, Barry James (2006). "Differences in infant and parent behaviors during routine bed sharing compared with cot sleeping in the home setting". Pediatrics. 117 (5): 1599–1607. doi:10.1542/peds.2005-1636. PMID 16651313. Wikidata Q42684577.
- Sally A Baddock; Galland, Barbara Carolyn; Taylor, Barry James; David P G Bolton (2007). "Sleep arrangements and behavior of bed-sharing families in the home setting". Pediatrics. 119 (1): e200-7. doi:10.1542/peds.2006-0744. PMID 17200244. Wikidata Q48481251.
