= Alberto Carlo Lolli =

Italian film director

- Born: c.1876 Naples, Italy
- Occupation: Director
- Years active: 1909-1923 (film)

Alberto Carlo Lolli was an Italian film director of the silent era. He made more than thirty films between 1909 and 1923.

== Selected filmography ==
- The Vengeance of Jago (1912)

== Bibliography ==
- Eddie Sammons. Shakespeare: A Hundred Years on Film. Scarecrow Press, 2004.
