= Hallie Anderson =

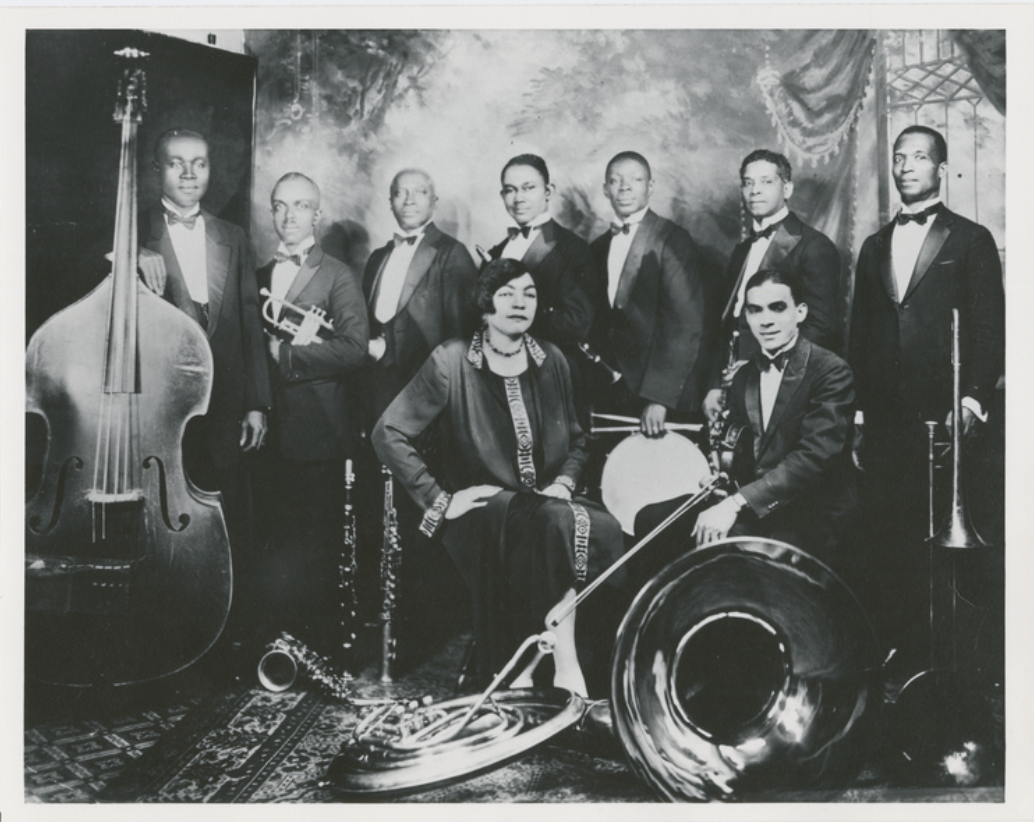
Hallie Anderson and her orchestra in 1910

Hallie Anderson (January 5, 1885 – November 9, 1927) was an American dance orchestra conductor and theater band director during the Harlem Renaissance.

Anderson was born in Lynchburg, Virginia, and died in New York City in 1927.
