= David Lolli =

Italian physician (1825–1884)

- Born: 1825; Gorizia, Austrian Empire
- Died: 1884 (aged 58–59); Triest, Habsburg Empire
- Occupation: Physician
- Medical career
- Research: Psychology, magnetism

David Lolli (1825–1884) was an Italian medical doctor.

== Biography ==
David Lolli was born in Gorizia. His father, the Talmud Torah teacher Samuel Vita Lolli, was a friend and cousin of Samuel David Luzzatto, and his brother Eude Lolli was one of Luzzatto's students.

Lolli studied medicine in Padua and later in Vienna. On the outbreak of the Italian war for liberation, he interrupted his studies to join the Battaglione universitario romano. He traveled to Padua to volunteer and participated in the unsuccessful defense of Vicenza. He later joined the garrison guarding Venice. While in the city, he contracted cholera.

On his recovery, he returned to his hometown before eventually settling in Triest, where he practiced medicine. Lolli remained politically active, advocating for Italian independence, including the incorporation of Gorizia and Trieste into Italy, which often put him at risk. In 1859, he took part in the Second Italian War of Independence as a doctor.

Lolli wrote extensively, particularly on topics related to psychology and magnetism. Most of his works remained in manuscripts.

== Publications ==
- Sul magnetismo animale. Padua: A. Bianchi. 1850.
- Sulla migliare, due parole d'occasione. Triest. 1857.
- Sii forte e sarai libero (Seneca). Sii libero e sarai forte (Autore). Milan. 1860. Published anonymously for political reasons.
- I numi. Milan. 1866. A symbolic story published under the pseudonym "Aldo Apocalissio."
- Sul cholera. Triest. 1866.
- L'amore dal lato fisiologico, filosofico e sociale: osservazioni e pensamenti d'un vecchio medico. Milan. 1883.
