= Peter Loli =

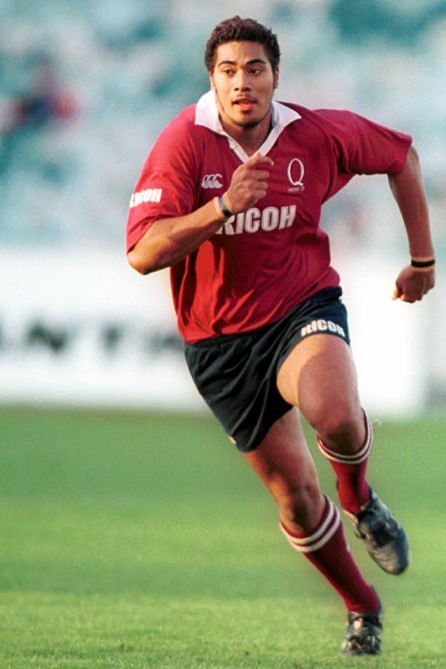
- Full name: Peter Jonathan Loli
- Born: 2 February 1980 (age 46) Auckland New Zealand
- Height: 1.93 m (6 ft 4 in)
- Weight: 110 kg (17 st 5 lb; 243 lb)
- School: Marist College Ashgrove

Rugby union career
- Position: Outside back
Senior career
Years	Team	Apps	(Points)
1998–00	Reds		
2007	Ballymore Tornadoes	2	(8)
International career
Years	Team	Apps	(Points)
1999–00	Australia Sevens		(45)

Peter Loli (born 2 February 1980) is an Australian rugby union player who played as an outside back for the Queensland Reds as well as for Queensland Reds B (also known as the Queensland Red Heelers).

== Career ==
Born in Auckland, New Zealand, Loli began playing his junior rugby for Otahuhu RFC before moving to Queensland at the age of 12. After arriving in Australia, Loli played his junior rugby for North Brisbane Rugby Club. While attending Marist College Ashgrove, Loli signed with the Queensland Reds. Loli became the second player to sign with the Queensland Reds while still at school, the first being Elton Flatley.

Loli also represented Australia in the World Rugby Sevens Series (formerly known as the IRB Sevens World Series) as well as being selected for the Australian Barbarians.

Loli played in the Queensland premier grade rugby competition for Brothers Old Boys, North Brisbane Rugby Club as well as GPS Rugby Club.

== Personal life ==
Peter Loli is the son of Laufika Loli and Alosina To'omalatai, both of Samoan heritage. Loli's mother is the cousin of Samoan rugby international Stan To'omalatai.
