= Sleep Medicine Reviews =

- Discipline: Sleep medicine
- Language: English
- Edited by: J. Krieger, M.V. Vitiello

Publication details
- History: 1997-present
- Publisher: Elsevier
- Frequency: Bimonthly
- Impact factor: 10.517 (2018)

Standard abbreviations
- ISO 4: Sleep Med. Rev.

Indexing
- CODEN: SMREFC
- ISSN: 1087-0792
- OCLC no.: 44893270

Links
- Journal homepage; Online access; Online archive

Sleep Medicine Reviews is a bimonthly peer-reviewed medical journal covering research on the diagnosis and therapy of sleep disturbances and disorders (sleep medicine). It was established in 1997 and is published by Elsevier. The editors-in-chief are J. Krieger (Louis Pasteur University) and Michael V Vitiello (University of Washington).

== Abstracting and indexing ==
The journal is abstracted and indexed in:

- BIOSIS Previews
- EMBASE
- Excerpta Medica
- MEDLINE/PubMed
- Science Citation Index Expanded
- Scopus

According to the Journal Citation Reports, the journal has a 2018 impact factor of 10.517.
