= Egil Halle =

Norwegian resistance member (1918–1988)

- Born: 16 March 1918
- Died: 20 February 1988 (aged 69); Ålsfjellet
- Known for: Norwegian resistance

Egil Halle (16 March 1918 – 20 February 1988) was a Norwegian resistance member.

After Germany invaded Norway in 1940, he participated in battles of the Norwegian Campaign. He joined Milorg where he was trained in weapons use by Svein Blindheim and William Houlder. In 1943, he joined Oslogjengen's Operation Bundle and obtained the status of an acting soldier in the Norwegian Independent Company 1, although he did not receive military training in the United Kingdom. He was arrested on 14 November 1944, and was incarcerated at Møllergata 19 until 30 December, then at Grini concentration camp until 8 May 1945. He was decorated with the Norwegian Defence Medal, the British Defence Medal and the St. Olav's Medal With Oak Branch.

After the war he worked in the company of fellow resistance member Max Manus. He died from heart failure at his cabin in Ålsfjellet in February 1988.
