= Loli Sánchez =

Spanish basketball player

Personal information
- Born: July 1, 1964 (age 62) Spain
- Listed height: 193 cm (6 ft 4 in)

Career information
- Playing career: 1982–1990
- Position: Center

Career history
- 1982-1986: Avón Alcalá
- 1987-1988: CEPSA Tenerife
- 1988-1990: BEX Banco Exterior

Career highlights
- Spanish League champion (1985)

María Dolores Sánchez Gil (born 1 July 1964), known as Loli Sánchez, is a former Spanish professional basketball player representing Spain. She won the 1985-86 Copa Federación with Avón Alcalá, and also played for CEPSA Tenerife and BEX Banco Exterior. In 1988 she joined the BEX project, a pre-olympic team which played together for several seasons in order to compete in the 1992 Barcelona Olympics, but she stopped playing in the summer of 1990.

She made her debut with Spain women's national basketball team at the age of 19. She played with the senior team for 7 years, from 1983 to 1990, with a total of 128 caps and 4.4 PPG. She participated in three European Championships:

- 11th1983 Eurobasket
- 10th1985 Eurobasket
- 6th1987 Eurobasket
