= Lollipop F =

Taiwanese Mandopop boy band

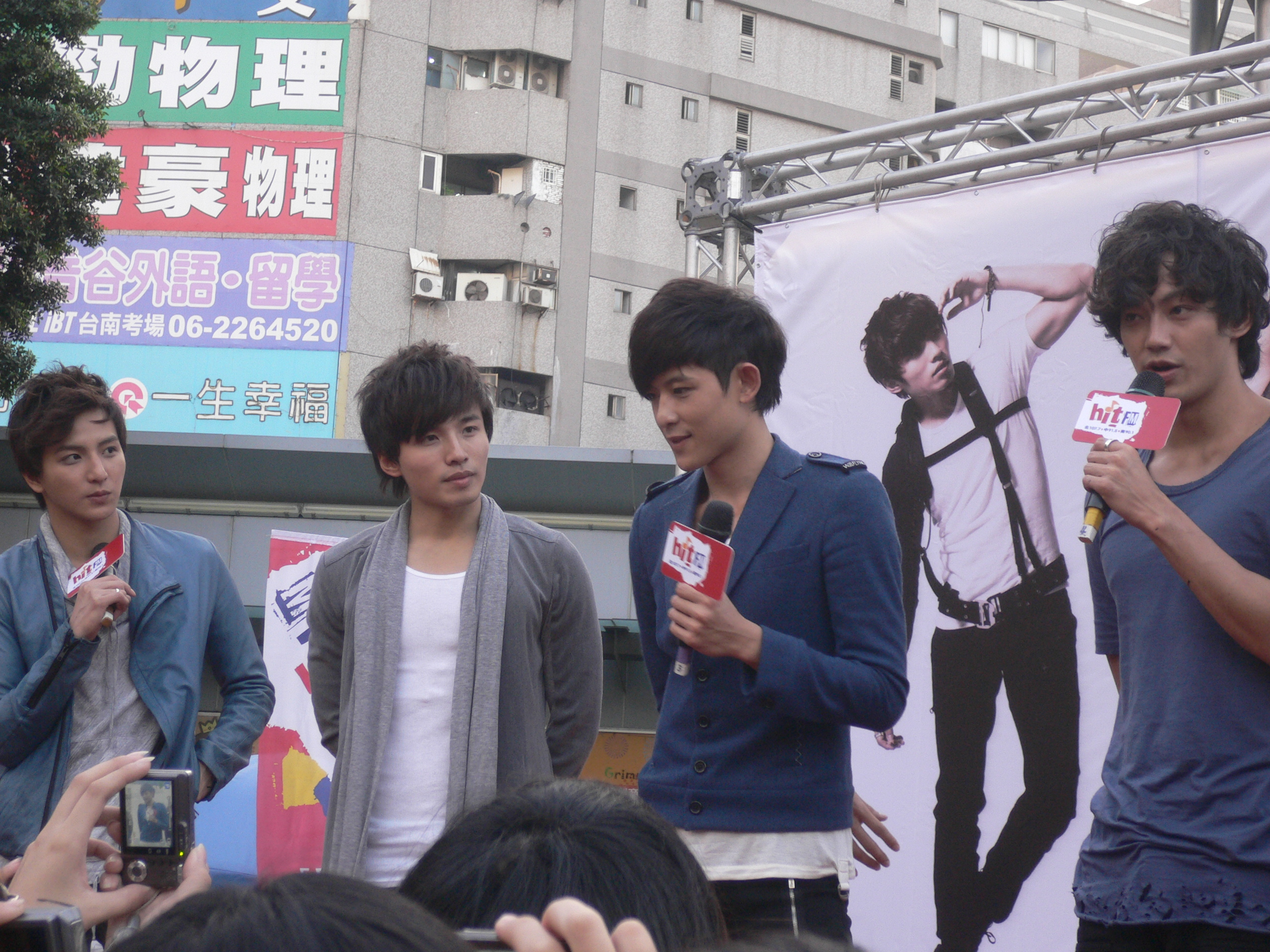
- Lollipop F at Four Dimensions Tainan autograph session in 2010

Background information
- Origin: Taipei, Taiwan
- Genres: Dance-pop; Mandopop
- Years active: 2006–2017
- Labels: Gold Typhoon (formerly EMI Music Taiwan) (2010–2013); Seed Music Co., Ltd. (2014–2017)
- Past members: Owodog; A-Wei; Fabien; William; Liljay; Wang Zi

Lollipop F (Chinese: 棒棒堂; pinyin: Bàng bàng táng; Japanese: ロリポップF; Korean: 롤리팝 F) was a Taiwanese boy band gaining popularity throughout Asia. The group started off with six members, all chosen from Channel [V] Taiwan's show Bang Bang Tang (模范棒棒堂, 'BBT'), a show which sought to create new male artistes in the entertainment business of Taiwan.

Towards the end of 2009, it was announced that the group has split up, with members Liljay and Wang Zi leaving the group. In October 2010, the rest of the members, Owodog, A-Wei, Fabien and William, were regrouped to form Lollipop F, with 'F' representing "four", the number of members in their group, as well as their belief in continuing the Lollipop spirit "forever".

Lollipop signed with EMI Music Taiwan on December 2, 2006 and released their first EP in January 2007. With Gold Label Records' acquisition of EMI Music Taiwan, Lollipop was signed under the label Gold Typhoon until 2013 when the group had a contractual dispute with the label. They then went on and signed with A Entertainment and Seed Music. But after a year, they disbanded in 2017.

== History ==
=== 2006 to 2009: Debut as Lollipop ===
==== Background & Formation (2006–2007) ====
Before entering the show Bang Bang Tang, Owodog and A-Wei were previous members of ºmommy breakdance group Brick Angle Crew.

In 2006, Owodog and Fabien were among the first group of boys to be selected into BBT through recommendations and auditions held across Taiwan, the processes of which were broadcast in the show's first three episodes. They were among the first 20 members of the showed which officially debuted on August 17, 2006. William and A-Wei made their first appearances on BBT on the October 13, 2006 episode where their auditions during the new selection round were aired. They were then selected to become members of the show.

On November 27, 2006, the episode in which the six members of the group were selected and revealed was aired. Notably, William and A-Wei's inclusion in the group was determined only moments before the announcements were filmed. The members signed a contract to Channel V, and Dora Ao became their artiste manager. The group, named Lollipop, then officially signed a contract with EMI Music Taiwan) on December 2, 2006. Owodog, being the leader in BBT, was appointed as the group leader as well. On December 9, 2006, Lollipop made its first public performance as a group at the V-Power Music Storm Concert.

==== 2007 to 2008: Colorful Lollipop, Acting debut ====
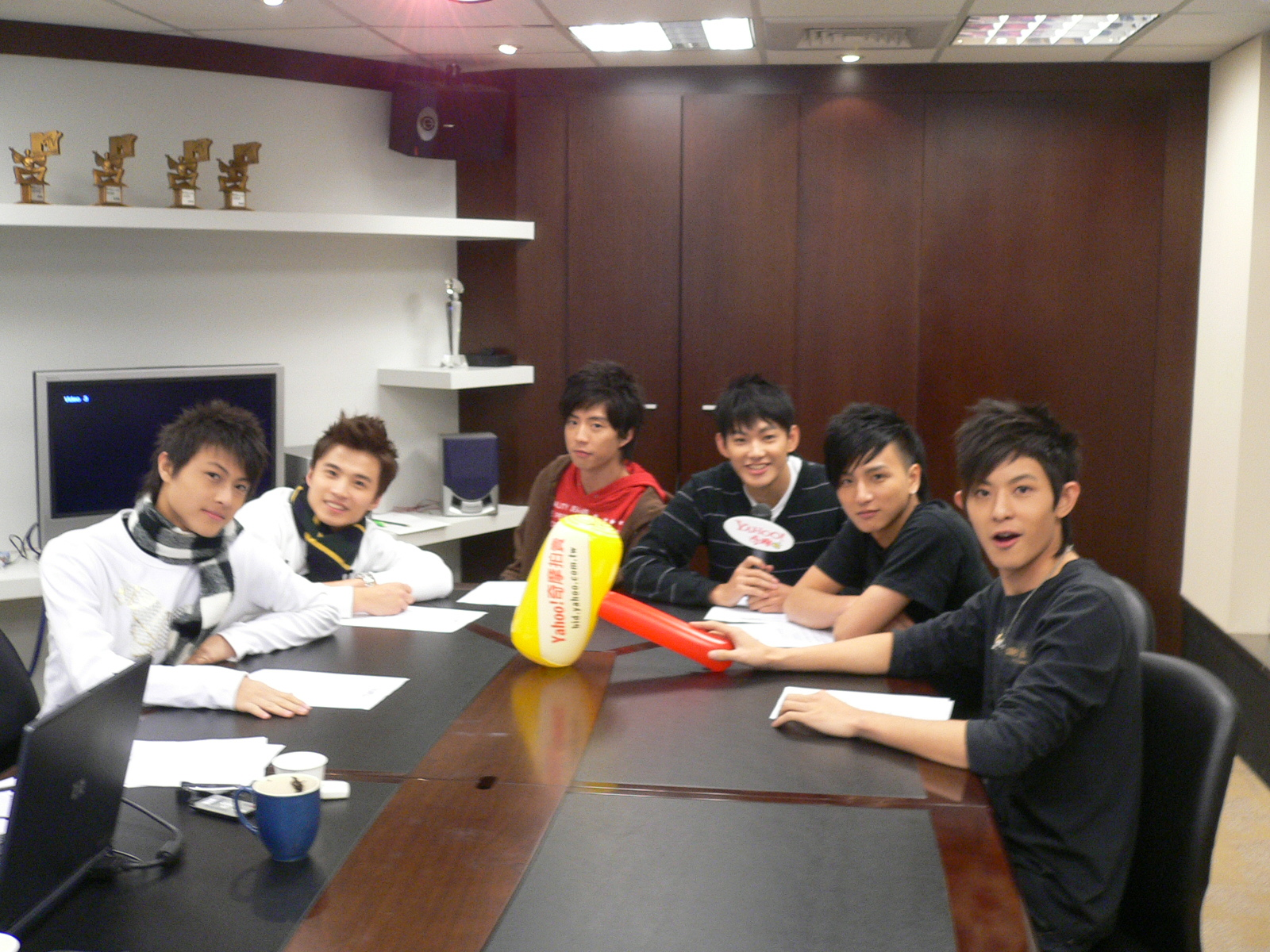
Lollipop with six members in 2007

Lollipop debut EP Colorful Lollipop was released on January 26, 2007, with six different covers, each featuring a member of the group. Four months later, on May 25, a second EP titled Summer's First Experience was released along with a photobook with compilation of photos taken in Okinawa, as well as a DVD. Lyrics for the song Summer's First Experience was written by Liljay and Prince.

During the summer of 2007, members of Lollipop made their acting debut in Taiwanese idol drama Brown Sugar Macchiato, a collaboration with girl group Hey Girl. Because of the large number of fifteen main characters and the many commitments both groups had apart from the drama, the original director quit after directing five episodes. Nevertheless, the first episode was aired in Taiwan on July 15, 2007. Later, Lollipop expressed on Taiwanese variety show Kangxi Lai Le that the drama had been more of an introduction of the two groups instead of a major acting challenge, as the members were told to act as their original selves, and that many subplots were explained only briefly due to the large number of main characters. After thirteen episodes, the drama ended on October 7, 2007. Additionally, an official soundtrack was released with songs by Lollipop and Hey Girl.

The same year, Lollipop began hosting their own show Lollipop Gyashan (LOLLIPOP哪裡怕) on October 27 until April 19, 2008, when the show stopped airing.

Their debut album Gyashan (Chinese: 哪裡怕; pinyin: Nǎli Pà) was released on December 28, 2007. Gyashan took down the first position in the Mandarin charts, outselling F4's album Waiting for You – Await Your Love (在這裡等你) which was released on the same day. Liljay contributed lyrics to three out of ten songs, co-writing one with Fabien. A solo by Fabien, who composed both the music and lyrics, was recorded as well.

On January 26, 2008, a year after the release of their first EP, the group held its debut concert at the Taipei Arena. The concert DVD was released on June 6, 2008, breaking chart records with sales rates of more than 35%. The DVD topped the charts for a period of one month after its release.

==== 2008 to 2009: Beyond Bang Bang Tang and solo projects ====
Lollipop had been appearing regularly on Bang Bang Tang since August 14, 2006. With Channel [V]'s decision to select a new batch of boys and create a second season, Lollipop and most of the other members "graduated" from Bang Bang Tang after their last performances as members of the show. Their last official episode aired on August 29, 2008, marking the end of the first season. In total, the members of Lollipop had participated in more than 500 episodes of the show. Since the start of Bang Bang Tang II, Lollipop had, on several occasions, returned to the show as guests or co-hosts.

Drama and hosting opportunities

In May, earlier the same year, A-Wei, Prince, and Fabien, part of the main cast, began shooting Lollipop's the second drama with members of Hey Girl and Bang Bang Tang. The drama, titled The Legend of Brown Sugar Chivalries, is a wuxia action drama set in modern times, which required the actors and actresses to learn and perform kungfu, as well as the use of weapons. Additionally, wire fu and special effects were used upon the cast for qinggong and some fighting scenes. The first episode was released on July 26, 2008 on Star TV Chinese Channel and had continued to air after the end of the first season of Bang Bang Tang. Later, Owodog guest starred in the drama, while Liljay and William had minor roles. The thirteenth and the last episode was aired on October 18, 2008, while the behind-the-scene footage was aired on October 25, 2008.

On October 3, 2008, the original soundtrack for The Legend of Brown Sugar Chivalries was released by Gold Typhoon, the songs of which includes lyric compositions by Liljay and Prince. A song involving collaboration with three members of Hey Girl was recorded, while Prince and Fabien both had a solo each. Two editions were released for the soundtrack album, one being a 10,000 limited edition.

After leaving Bang Bang Tang, William hosted a variety show called Wu Di Qing Chun Ke (無敵青春克) with Taiwanese singer Kenji Wu. The show finale was aired on November 5, 2008. On the other hand, Owodog, A-Wei, and Liljay began hosting Na Li Wu Da Kang (哪裡5打坑) with Hey Girl's Apple and Channel V's VJ Rong Jia. The show has since ended.

Film and other performing opportunities

One week after performing in Singapore, the group returned to Taiwan to participate in the 2008 V-Power Love Music Concert on November 29, 2008. The concert united Liljay, Owodog, and A-wei with other Black Angle Crew members for a dance performance, while Prince and Fabien performed their solos from the last soundtrack. Together, the six members performed five songs, including a remixed version of "You Make Me a Fool," Fabien's composition for the debut album. Lollipop's participation in the concert also marks, symbolically, the second anniversary of the group's formation.

A week later, on December 6, 2008, Lollipop performed four songs with themes of wushu at the 45th Golden Horse Awards ceremony.

After talks with Paco Wong in 2008, the chairman of Gold Records, Owodog was confirmed to be starring in a kungfu film called Hot-blooded Union (熱血同盟) with Theresa Fu and a member of The Flowers. The film has started filming near the end of 2008 in Beijing. Later, news also reveal that A-Wei, who impressed the director with his wushu skills, has been invited to guest star in the film. The name of the film has since been changed to Martial Spirit (武動青春), and a trailer was shown at Lollipop's I am Legend concert in Hong Kong.

Prince and members of Choc7 took part in the film L-O-V-E (愛到底), which consists of four short films directed by four different directors. The film was released on March 6, 2009.

As one of Channel [V]'s Chinese New Year programs, a short film called 狼牙棒 aired on January 26, 2009. The short film was produced by Owodog, William, and A-Wei, who starred in the film themselves.

In February, 2009, Channel [V] began filming its revamped version and new season of Bang Bang Tang, which marked the return of several members from the first season, including Lollipop. For the new season, Owodog shot and directed a promotional advertisement of members dancing at several sites in Taipei with Aben of Choc7. Bang Bang Tang III began airing on March 2, 2009, with Show Lo being the first guest star. In 2009, Lollipop made its first lyric contributions to other artistes, which was included in the mini album of the group Choc7, composed of seven members selected from the same show.

==== 2009: I am Legend: Second album and Asia tour ====
Lollipop's second album I am Legend was released on June 19, 2009. Nine out of the ten songs in the album included lyric contributions by Liljay, Owodog, Prince, and William and music compositions by Fabien and Prince for two songs. Solo performances by Liljay, Fabien, and William were recorded as well. A concert tour in Asia with the same name as the album commenced in Hong Kong Coliseum on July 4 and 5, 2009.

While promoting I am Legend on several Taiwanese variety shows, including Kangxi Lai Le, 100% Entertainment, Azio Superstar, etc., Lollipop created a series of dance performances specifically for the show hosts of each show, thus completing a mini TV performance tour.

With show host Christine Fan leaving the show to focus on her musical career, Bang Bang Tang's last episode was aired on July 30, 2009. The original time slot on Channel [V] has since been filled with a new show called Welcome外星人 that premiered on July 20, 2009, which was hosted by A-wei and William, along with Kevin Tsai. Prince was then given the opportunity to be part of the cast in a film called 精舞門2. Another short film directed and shot by A-wei called The Great Escape (廖問之越V風雲), starring Liljay, William, and members of Choc7 and Hey Girl, aired on Channel [V] on September 12, 2009.

=== 2010 to 2011: Comeback as Lollipop F ===
To start off with a new image, Owodog, Fabien, William, and A-wei underwent an extensive 200-day training under the company's arrangement to improve their performing abilities. On October 21, 2010, a news conference was held to announce the regrouping of the members to form "Lollipop F". Following the conference, Lollipop F's debut album Four Dimensions (四度空間) was released on November 6, 2010, featuring several songs of their own compositions, including the title track composed by Owodog and Fabien. Lollipop F was also appointed as Jeju Island's Taiwan Tourist Ambassadors by the Jeju Island Tourism Bureau, South Korea. The MVs for two songs in Four Dimensions were filmed at Jeju Island.

On January 13, 2011, Lollipop F held a press conference for the release of their tourism photobook, LOLLIPOP F Xi You Ji (棒棒堂嘻遊濟), announcing good results of the photobook sales exceeding 10,000 after 11 days of pre-ordering. The Four Dimensions (四度空間) album also accumulated sales of 160,000 copies globally.

Awards received for Four Dimensions

- G-Music 2010 Mandarin Music Charts 14th and Combined Music Charts 15th
- 14th position on Mandarin Music Charts of Taiwan's five main album stores
- 2010 IFPI Hong Kong Album Sales Award – Top Ten Best-Selling Mandarin Albums

=== 2011 to 2013: Expansion, Dance and Jade Solid Gold Best Ten Music Awards ===
In the summer of 2011, Lollipop F trained in South Korea for the group's upcoming album and was subsequently invited to participate in Korean TV station SBS's hit variety show Star King, singing and dancing alongside Super Junior. It was unprecedented in Taiwan's entertainment history for a Taiwan group's appearance in a South Korean show, and the experience gave the recently reformed group a major boost in their confidence and popularity. Owodog then starred in popular Taiwanese film, You Are the Apple of My Eye (那些年，我們一起追的女孩) as extended cast.

Nearly a year after their debut album, Lollipop F released their second album Dance on October 20, 2011. As the main attraction of the album, the electronic/hip-hop title track, DANCE (電司) features funky dance moves choreographed by Hamasaki Ayumi, Koda Kumi, and SMAP's dance teacher Sasaki Ko.

In March 2012, Lollipop F's leader, Owodog, participated in mainland China's reality TV dance competition, Let's Shake It (舞林大会) and fellow group members supported him as dancers for his performances. In the preliminary round recorded on March 1, 2012, Lollipop F's performance was awarded the highest score of 39.9 out of 40 by the four judges. The judges were impressed by their strong bonding as a group, their dance moves of high difficulty and their unique style of performance. Lollipop F then entered the finals after achieving another high score of 49.7 out of 50 in the semi-final round on April 24, 2012. In the finals, Lollipop F achieved a score of 68.7 out of 80 with the most creative performance in the history of the competition, eventually obtaining the second runner's up position and the highest popularity award.

On January 13, 2013, the group won the Asia Pacific Most Popular Male Singer award and the silver award for the Most Popular Chinese Song Awards category at the 2012 Jade Solid Gold Best Ten Music Awards Presentation.

=== 2013 to 2017: New label, Comeback with Big Shot, disbandment ===
In June 2013, it was reported that the group had contractual disputes with their label, Gold Typhoon, as the company is unwilling to terminate their contract and not providing adequate work opportunities to the members. Gold Typhoon denied having contract disputes with Lollipop-F and claimed that talks are in progress regarding the group's new album.

On July 20, 2013, the group ended their contract with Gold Typhoon and signed on to Hong Kong celebrity, Eric Tsang's company, A Entertainment. They attended the Asia-Pacific Film Festival as guest performers held in Macao after signing with their new agency.

After signing with their new label and management company, the group was preparing to release their new single in 2014. They filmed the music video for their new song in Paris, which costs NT$2 million to produce. In March 2014, the group released their first single in three years, How (怎麼了). In June, 2014, the group released their fourth EP, Big Shot, under Seed Music.

== Overseas expansion ==
=== Hong Kong and Mainland China ===
Lollipop

Lollipop visited Hong Kong to promote their television soundtrack Brown Sugar Macchiato on September 26, 2007. This was their first overseas promotional activity ever since their debut, and a huge fan turnout caused a great commotion at the shopping mall where they were having their meet-and-greet session. Lollipop returned to Hong Kong on Christmas to promote their debut album. On February 1, 2008 they traveled Hong Kong for the third time to guest star in the Cantonese movie Truth or Dare: 6th Floor Rear Flat 2, and on the 23rd of the same month, performed at Show Lo's concert as guests. On June 1, 2008, the group also participated in a fundraising concert for the Sichuan earthquake. Since then, Lollipop has made several visits to Hong Kong for different purposes, including autograph sessions, award ceremonies, as well as an end-of-the-year countdown. In 2009, Lollipop visited Hong Kong to promote its Asia tour, which commences in Hong Kong.

Lollipop visited Mainland China on March 23, 2008, to promote their debut album. With over 3000 fans, the autograph session was canceled due to safety reasons, as the situation grew out of control. Thus, fans were able to catch only a few glimpses of the group. Nevertheless, Lollipop stayed at the venue and finished signing each album in a separate room. Later the same year, from December 18 to 26, Lollipop made visits to several cities, including Wuhan, Shanghai, Beijing, Guangzhou, and Shenzhen, to promote the soundtrack for The Legend of Brown Sugar Chivalries.

Lollipop F

In 2011 to 2012, Lollipop F has visited various places in mainland China and Hong Kong to promote the Four Dimension and Dance albums.

=== Singapore and Malaysia ===
Lollipop

Lollipop traveled to Singapore on June 12, 2008, to promote their concert DVD. There was an autograph session held at a bar in Clarke Quay; thus, the organisers had to give out tickets to limit the number of fans entering. Later the same year, on November 22, Lollipop made another visit to Singapore to promote the official soundtrack of The Legend of Brown Sugar Chivalries, performing several songs at the Music Monster Festival, which also featured Taiwanese group Energy. The next day, an autograph session was held at IMM, which attracted more than 3000 fans.

The group visited Malaysia for the first time on June 5, 2009. They were invited to be performing guests during the finals of the television show Ultimate Power Group the next day.

Lollipop F

Lollipop F visited Singapore in both 2011 and 2012 to hold autograph sessions for both Four Dimensions and Dance albums respectively. They also had a live performance at the televised Sheng Siong Show (缤纷万千在升菘) on February 4, 2012.

On 16 June 2012, Lollipop F performed at Hennessy Artistry Penang, Malaysia.

=== South Korea ===
Lollipop F

In the summer of 2011, Lollipop F was invited to take part in Korean TV station SBS's hit variety show Star King, singing and dancing alongside Super Junior.

=== Australia (Sydney & Melbourne) ===
Lollipop F

On March 30 and 31, 2012, Lollipop F held two mini concerts in Sydney and Melbourne respectively.

== Members ==
Stage name		Birth name		Date of birth
English	Chinese	Pinyin	Chinese	Date of birth
Owodog	敖犬	Chuang Hao-chuan	莊濠全	October 30, 1982 (age 43)
Fabien	小煜	Yang Chi-yu	楊奇煜	July 5, 1985 (age 41)
William	威廉	Liao Yi-yin	廖亦崟	October 7, 1985 (age 40)
A-Wei / Wayne	阿緯	Liu Chun-wei	劉峻緯	October 15, 1985 (age 40)

== Discography ==
For complete Lollipop Discography (2006–2009) prior to Lollipop F and JPM, see also: Lollipop Discography

=== Studio ===
(Lollipop) Album	English Name	Chinese name	Release Date	Label
1st	Gyashan	哪裡怕; Nǎli Pà	December 28, 2007	EMI Music
	Gyashan – Limited Edition	哪裡怕 – 限量炫光珍藏版; Nǎli Pà – Xiàn Liàng Xuàn Guāng Zhēn Cáng Bǎn	February 1, 2008	EMI Music
2nd	I am Legend	我是傳奇; Wǒ Shì Chuán Qí	June 19, 2009	Gold Typhoon
3rd	Lollipop's I am Legend + Choc7's Sonic Youth	卒業紀念限定盤 (合體雙拼改版); Cù Yè Jì Niàn Xiàn Dìng Pán (Gě Tǐ Shuāng Pīn Gǎi Bǎn)	August 14, 2009	Gold Typhoon

(Lollipop F) Album	English Name	Chinese name	Release Date	Label
1st	Four Dimensions	四度空間; Sì dù kōngjiān	November 9, 2010	Gold Typhoon
2nd	DANCE	電司; Diàn sī	October 26, 2011	Gold Typhoon

=== EPs ===
Album	English Name	Chinese name	Release Date	Label
1st	Colorful Lollipop	七彩棒棒堂; Qī Cǎi Bàng Bàng Táng	January 26, 2007	EMI Music
	Colorful Lollipop – Special Edition	七彩棒棒堂 – 無敵慶功版; Qī Cǎi Bàng Bàng Táng – Wú Dí Qìng Gōng Bǎn	March 9, 2007	EMI Music
2nd	Summer's First Experience	夏日初體驗; Xià Rì Chū Tǐ Yàn	May 25, 2007	EMI Music
3rd	I am Legend 2009 ASIA TOUR Special Issue	我是傳奇2009亞洲巡迴演唱會 – 寫真限定單曲; Wǒ Shì Chuán Qí 2009 Yà Zhōu Xún Huí Yǎn Chàng Huì – Xiě Zhēn Xiàn Dìng Dān Qǔ	February 6, 2010	Gold Typhoon
4th	Big Shot	那麼厲害; Nà Me Lì Hài	April 1, 2014	Seed Music

=== Soundtracks ===
Album	English Name	Chinese name	Release Date	Label
1st	Brown Sugar Macchiato – OST	黑糖瑪奇朵 – 原聲帶; Hēi Táng Mǎ Qí Duǒ – Yuán Shēng Dài	August 31, 2007	EMI Music
2nd	The Legend of Brown Sugar Chivalries (Limited Edition) – OST	黑糖群俠傳 (群俠包袱限量版) – 電視原聲帶; Hēi Táng Qún Xiá Chuán (Qún Xiá Bāofu Xiàn Liàng Bǎn) – Diàn Shì Yuán Shēng Dài	October 3, 2008	Gold Typhoon
	The Legend of Brown Sugar Chivalries – OST	黑糖群俠傳 (型男奇俠版) – 電視原聲帶; Hēi Táng Qún Xiá Chuán (Xíng Nán Qí Xiá Bǎn) – Diàn Shì Yuán Shēng Dài	October 9, 2008	Gold Typhoon

=== Concert DVD ===
Album	English Name	Chinese name	Release Date	Label
1st	The Dream Embarks – Sparkling Taipei Arena Concert	夢想出發 – 閃耀小巨蛋演唱會; Mèng Xiǎng Chū Fā – Shǎn Yào Xiǎo Jù Dàn Yǎn Chàng Huì	June 6, 2008	EMI Music

== TV Shows Hosting ==
Year	Date	Channel	Title	Hosts	Type
2006	18 August onwards	Channel V Taiwan	模范棒棒堂 Bang Bang Tang	Lollipop (All), Christine Fan (范瑋琪), Rong Jia (劉容嘉), Xiao Xiang (小香)	Programme Participants
2007	All-Year	Channel V Taiwan	模范棒棒堂 Bang Bang Tang	Lollipop (All), Christine Fan (范瑋琪), Rong Jia (劉容嘉), Xiao Xiang (小香)	Programme Participants
2007	Occasional	Channel V Taiwan	我愛黑澀會 Blackie's Teenage Club	Lollipop (All), Blackie Chen (陳建州), Rong Jia (劉容嘉), Xiao Xiang (小香)	Assistant Hosts
2007	27 October onwards	Channel V Taiwan	LOLLIPOP哪裡怕	Lollipop (All)	Main Hosts
2008	Till 29 August	Channel V Taiwan	模范棒棒堂 Bang Bang Tang	Lollipop (All), Christine Fan (范瑋琪), Rong Jia (劉容嘉), Xiao Xiang (小香)	Programme Elects
2008	Till 19 April	Channel V Taiwan	LOLLIPOP哪裡怕	Lollipop (All)	Main Hosts
2008	Occasional	Channel V Taiwan	模范棒棒堂 Bang Bang Tang	Lollipop (All), Christine Fan (范瑋琪), Rong Jia (劉容嘉), Xiao Xiang (小香)	Assistant Hosts
2008	25 August to 5 November	Channel V Taiwan	無敵青春克 Unbeatable Youth	William, Kenji Wu (吳克群)	Main Host
2008	7 September to 30 November	Channel V Taiwan	哪裡5打坑	Owodog, Liljay, A-Wei, Rong Jia (劉容嘉), Apple	Main Hosts
2009	2 March to 30 July	Channel V Taiwan	模范棒棒堂 Bang Bang Tang	Lollipop (All), Christine Fan (范瑋琪), Rong Jia (劉容嘉), Xiao Xiang (小香)	Programme Participants
2009	20 July to 15 October	Channel V Taiwan	Welcome外星人 Welcome Alien	A-Wei, William, Kevin Tsai (蔡康永)	Main Hosts
2009	November to 20 December	STAR Chinese Channel	旅行應援團 Travel Ouendan	A-Wei, Xu Xiao Shun (許效舜), Li Yi (李懿)	Main Hosts
2010	4 July onwards	China Entertainment Television	KKBOX音樂互聯	Lollipop F (All)	Main Hosts
2010	27 October	GTV Variety Show	娛樂百分百 100% Entertainment	Owodog, William, Alien Huang (小鬼)	Replacement Hosts
2011	All-Year	China Entertainment Television	KKBOX音樂互聯	Lollipop F (All)	Main Hosts
2011	1 May to 31 July	GTV Variety Show	驚奇四潮男 Fantastic Four	Lollipop F (All)	Main Hosts
2012	Till 25 March	China Entertainment Television	KKBOX音樂互聯	Lollipop F (All)	Main Hosts
2012	9 April	Next Television	蘋果娛樂新聞 Apple Entertainment News	Owodog, Weng Tzy Mann (翁滋蔓)	Replacement Host
2012	(MM/DD): 07/19—Owodog, Butterfly (蝴蝶姐姐); 07/20—William, Butterfly (蝴蝶姐姐); 07/26—Owodog, Butterfly (蝴蝶姐姐); 08/16—William, Butterfly (蝴蝶姐姐); 08/18—William, Butterfly (蝴蝶姐姐); 08/23—Owodog, Butterfly (蝴蝶姐姐); 08/24—William, Butterfly (蝴蝶姐姐); 08/25—Owodog, Butterfly (蝴蝶姐姐); 08/31—William, Butterfly (蝴蝶姐姐); 09/01—Fabien, Butterfly (蝴蝶姐姐); 09/17—William, Butterfly (蝴蝶姐姐); 09/21—William, Butterfly (蝴蝶姐姐); 09/22—William, Alien Huang (黃鴻升|小鬼); 09/26—William, Butterfly (蝴蝶姐姐); 10/01—William, Butterfly (蝴蝶姐姐); 10/03—William, Butterfly (蝴蝶姐姐); 10/10—William, Butterfly (蝴蝶姐姐); 10/12—William, Butterfly (蝴蝶姐姐); 10/22—William, Alien Huang (黃鴻升|小鬼); 10/26—William, Alien Huang (黃鴻升|小鬼); 10/27—William, Alien Huang (黃鴻升|小鬼); 10/29—Owodog, Butterfly (蝴蝶姐姐) (Part of the programme includes an interview with Lena by Owodog and William); 10/31—William, Butterfly (蝴蝶姐姐); 11/02—William, Butterfly (蝴蝶姐姐); 11/03—William, Butterfly (蝴蝶姐姐); 11/05—Owodog, Butterfly (蝴蝶姐姐); 11/09—Owodog, Butterfly (蝴蝶姐姐); 11/22—Owodog, Butterfly (蝴蝶姐姐); 11/24—William, Butterfly (蝴蝶姐姐); 11/26—Owodog, Butterfly (蝴蝶姐姐); 11/28—William, Butterfly (蝴蝶姐姐); 11/29—William, Butterfly (蝴蝶姐姐); 12/01—Owodog, Butterfly (蝴蝶姐姐); 12/03—William, Butterfly (蝴蝶姐姐); 12/05—William, Alien Huang (黃鴻升|小鬼); 12/08—Alien Huang (黃鴻升|小鬼), Butterfly (蝴蝶姐姐) (Part of the programme includes an interview with Miss A by Owodog and William); 12/10—William, Butterfly (蝴蝶姐姐); 12/11—Owodog, Alien Huang (黃鴻升|小鬼); 12/15—William, Butterfly (蝴蝶姐姐); 12/19—Owodog, Butterfly (蝴蝶姐姐); 12/20—William, Butterfly (蝴蝶姐姐); 12/21—William, Butterfly (蝴蝶姐姐); 12/22—Owodog, Butterfly (蝴蝶姐姐); 12/24—Owodog, Butterfly (蝴蝶姐姐); 12/26—William, Alien Huang (黃鴻升|小鬼); 12/27—Owodog, Butterfly (蝴蝶姐姐); 12/28—Owodog, Alien Huang (黃鴻升|小鬼)	GTV Variety Show	娛樂百分百 100% Entertainment	Owodog, William, Fabien, Show Lo (羅志祥), Alien Huang (黃鴻升|小鬼), Butterfly (蝴蝶姐姐)	Replacement Hosts
2012	21 September	SET Sanlih Television	完全娛樂 New Showbiz	Owodog, William	Replacement Hosts
2012	26 September, 26 October	SET Sanlih Television	完全娛樂 New Showbiz	A-Wei, Hsueh Shih-ling	Replacement Host
2012	20 December	SET Sanlih Television	完全娛樂 New Showbiz	Fabien, 4ever	Replacement Host
2012	8 to 25 October	Taiwan Channel 3, Channel 4	Lollipop F (All)	Main Hosts	
2013	(MM/DD): 01/01—Owodog, Butterfly (蝴蝶姐姐); 01/03—Owodog, Alien Huang (黃鴻升|小鬼); 01/04—Owodog, Alien Huang (黃鴻升|小鬼); 01/05—Owodog, Butterfly (蝴蝶姐姐); 01/07—Owodog, Butterfly (蝴蝶姐姐); 01/08—William, Alien Huang (黃鴻升|小鬼); 01/14—William, Alien Huang (黃鴻升|小鬼); 01/21—William, Butterfly (蝴蝶姐姐); 01/23—William, Butterfly (蝴蝶姐姐); 01/25—William, Alien Huang (黃鴻升|小鬼); 01/26—William, Alien Huang (黃鴻升|小鬼); 01/30—William, Butterfly (蝴蝶姐姐); 01/31—William, Butterfly (蝴蝶姐姐)	GTV Variety Show	娛樂百分百 100% Entertainment	Owodog, William, Show Lo (羅志祥), Alien Huang (黃鴻升|小鬼), Butterfly (蝴蝶姐姐)	Replacement Hosts
2013	25 March onwards	Super TV	神馬好時光 What A Good Time	William, Fabien, Butterfly (蝴蝶姐姐)	Main Hosts

== Filmography ==
=== TV series ===
Years	English name	Chinese name	Members involved & Roles	Type of cast
2006	Express Boy	惡男宅急電	Owodog – Pub Customer	Extra
2006	White Robe of Love	白袍之戀	Owodog – High School Student	Extra
2006	The Magicians of Love	愛情魔法師	Owodog – Photographer	Extra
2007	Brown Sugar Macchiato	黑糖瑪奇朵	Owodog – Owodog; Fabien – Fabien; William – William; A-Wei – A-Wei	Leading Actors
2008	The Legend of Brown Sugar Chivalries	黑糖群俠傳	Fabien – Chu Liu Xiang (楚琉香); A-Wei – Guo Jing (郭敬); Owodog – Hong Shi Ba (洪十八); William – Zu Qiu Shuang Xia (足球雙俠)	Leading Actors – Fabien, A-Wei; Guest Stars – Owodog, William
2010	Gloomy Salad Days	死神少女	Owodog – Jin Jie Shu/A-Jie (金介書/阿介)	Guest Star
2011	Love Keeps Going	美樂。加油	Lollipop F – Lollipop F	Guest Stars
2012	Bra Girl (Microfilm)	內衣少女	William – Song Yi Xiang (宋以祥)	Leading Actor
2012	PM10-AM03	PM10-AM03	Fabien – Andrew (安德魯)	Leading Actor
2012	Gung Hay Fat Choy	我們發財了	Fabien – Yang Yi Jie/Black Jack (楊以杰/黑傑克) (from Episode 41 onwards)	Leading Actor
2012	Showbiz Special- Jing's Music Love Story	完全娛樂特別企劃 - 《張芸京音樂愛情故事》	Fabien – Fabien; William – William	Leading Actors
2013	Lady Maid Maid	愛情女僕	William – Alex	Guest Star
2013	Water Boys (yet to be broadcast)	水男孩	William – Chen Hao Hou (陳浩厚)	Leading Actor

=== Films ===
Years	English name	Chinese name	Members involved & Roles	Type of Cast
2008	Truth or Dare 2: Happy Funeral	六樓后座2家屬謝禮	Lollipop – Lollipop	Guest Stars
2010	Martial Spirit	武動青春	Owodog – Gao Da Wei (高大偉); A-Wei – Guo Yong (郭勇)	Leading Actor – Owodog; Guest Star – A-Wei
2011	You Are the Apple of My Eye	那些年，我們一起追的女孩	Owodog – Cao Guo Sheng/Lao-Cao (曹國勝/老曹)	Supporting Actor
2011	Summer Love	戀夏戀夏戀戀下/夏日恋神马	Owodog – Nuan Nuan (暖暖)	Leading Actor
2011	The Woman Knight of Mirror Lake	競雄女俠秋瑾	A-Wei – Liu Dao-Yi (劉道一)	Supporting Actor
2013	Machi Action	變身	Owodog – FACE	Leading Actor
2013	Get Together	逗陣ㄟ	Owodog – Kindergarten Teacher	Supporting Actor
2013	Unbeatable	激戰MMA	A-Wei – Young Cheng Hui (少年程輝)	Supporting Actor
2013	The Four II	四大名捕II	A-Wei – Jiang Noe	Supporting Actor

=== Short films ===
This table includes short films that are directed and produced by members of Lollipop, which were aired on Channel [V] independently (i.e. not as part of the show Bang Bang Tang).

Years	English name	Chinese name	Contributing Members
2009	Lang Ya Bang	狼牙棒	A-Wei, Owodog, William
2009	The Great Escape	廖問之越V風雲	A-Wei, Liljay, William, Bernie

== Concert appearances ==
This list does not include year-end galas or autograph/performance sessions.

=== Own concerts ===
Date	English name	Chinese name	Venue	Remarks
January 26, 2008	Lollipop Taipei Arena Concert	哪裡怕 台北小巨蛋演唱會	Taipei Arena	Debut concert
July 4–5, 2009	Lollipop "I am Legend" Asia Tour: Hong Kong	棒棒堂《我是傳奇》亞洲巡迴演唱會- 香港站	Hong Kong Coliseum	First stop of Asia Tour
December 12, 2009	Lollipop "I am Legend" Asia Tour: Guangzhou	棒棒堂《我是傳奇》亞洲巡迴演唱會- 廣州站	Guangzhou Gymnasium	Last concert as Lollipop
May 24, 2010	Lollipop F "One Call, Mass Response" Concert	棒棒堂 一呼百應 演唱會	Changsha 公安高等專科學校	For Mainland China's Reality TV show, One Call, Mass Response
March 30, 2012	Lollipop F Live! Australia Sydney Mini Concert	LOLLIPOP F 棒棒堂Live! 澳洲悉尼音樂會	Home The Venue	
March 31, 2012	Lollipop F Australia Dance Melbourne Mini Concert	LOLLIPOP F 棒棒堂 澳洲電司迷你音樂High歌會（墨爾本）	Billboard Chinatown	

=== Guest appearances ===
Date	English name	Chinese name	Remarks
April 21, 2007	Stefanie Sun Celebratory Concert	孫燕姿 慶功演唱會	Guests
February 23, 2008	Show Lo Show on Stage Concert	羅志祥 一支獨秀演唱會	Guests for first HK show; First concert performance in Hong Kong
November 1, 2008	"We are Friends" Christine Fan Concert	我們是朋友 范瑋琪 2008巡迴演唱會	Guests for Taipei show
August 19, 2009	Christine Fan F.One "We are Friends" Concert	范瑋琪 F.one我們是朋友香港北京巡迴演唱會	Guests for Hong Kong show
May 2, 2010	Show Lo Dance Without Limits 3D World Live Tour Concert	羅志祥 舞法舞天 Concert	Guests for Hong Kong show; Last concert guest appearance as Lollipop
October 30, 2010	Jay Shih See Ya Halloween Mini Concert	是元介 See Ya萬聖節河岸留言音樂會	Fabien (Lollipop F) as guest
December 4, 2010	Jing Chang Right or Not Concert	張芸京 正不正演唱會	Fabien (Lollipop F) as guest for Hong Kong show; Video recording by Lollipop F
March 5, 2011	Show Lo Dance Without Limits Show World Live Tour Concert	羅志祥 2010舞法舞天3D 巡迴演唱會 SHOW WORLD LIVE TOUR	Guests for Guangzhou show; Dance Without Limits Final Tour
July 3, 2011	Cyndi Wang Especially Sticky Mini-Concert	王心凌 大黏特黏河岸留言音樂會	Owodog as guest
September 24, 2011	Amber An Mean Girl Concert	安心亞 惡女演唱會	Lollipop F as guests for Taipei show
January 26–27, 2013	Raymond Lam A Time 4 You Concert 2013	林峯 A Time 4 You 演唱會2013	Lollipop F as guests for both Hong Kong shows

=== Other concerts ===
This table consists of concerts where Lollipop is one of many artists who performed.

Date	English name	Chinese name	Remarks
December 9, 2006	V-Power Music Storm Concert	V-Power 音樂風暴演唱會	First public performance as Lollipop; Hosted by Channel V and leTea
June 9, 2007	Kaoshiung LeParty	高雄樂派對	Hosted by Channel V and leTea
October 27, 2007	MTV Concert	MTV樂翻天演唱會	Hosted by MTV and leTea
March 1, 2008	2008 HITO Music Awards Concert	2008 HITO流行音樂獎暨萬人演唱會	Hosted by Hit FM
June 1, 2008	Artistes 512 Fundraising Campaign	演藝界512關愛行動	Fundraising campaign in Hong Kong for the Sichuan earthquake
July 4, 2008	Maokong Gondola Concert	貓纜演唱會	Hosted by TRTC
November 29, 2008	V-Power Love Music Concert	V-Power 愛音樂演唱會	Hosted by Channel V and McDonald's
January 31, 2009	Kaoshiung Lantern Festival Opening Night	犇牛迎世運‧高雄愛幸福「開幕之夜」	Hosted by Kaoshiung city government
October 6, 2009	11th Chinese/Korean Music Festival	第十一屆中韓歌會	Performance in Qingdao
November 27, 2011	MTV Mandarin Awards Concert	MTV 封神榜演唱會	as Lollipop F onwards
January 1, 2012	Macau New Year Countdown Concert	澳門跨年演唱會	
February 18, 2012	23rd 30 Hour Famine Sunset Concert	第23屆飢餓三十夕陽音樂會	Hosted by World Vision 30 Hour Famine Movement
May 25, 2012	South Korea Yeosu World Expo Big-O Concert	韓國麗水世博會BIG-O演唱會	Performance in South Korea
September 8, 2012	Tainan International Music Festival Concert	台南國際友好音樂節	Representative of Taiwan's Male Group; Performed Dance with Black Angle Crew (黑角)
December 31, 2012 / January 1, 2013	WOW Kaohsiung 2013 Amazing City New Year Countdown Concert	WOW高雄2013不思議港都跨年夜	Fabien performed alongside three other actors in a special performance and sung his own solo, No More Loving (不在親愛); Lollipop F performed as finale guests

== Awards ==
=== Lollipop (2006–2009) ===
Year	Award	Category	Recipient
2007	SINA MUSIC Most Popular Awards	Favourite New Group (Silver)	Lollipop
2007	Canada HIT Chinese Billboard	Nation's Recommended New Group	Lollipop
2008	HITO Radio Music Awards	Best Male Group	Lollipop
2008	TVB8 Awards (TVB8金曲榜)	Best Group	Lollipop
2008	6th Hong Kong Yahoo! Search Popularity Awards	International Music Group	Lollipop
2008	MengNiu Yoghurt Music Billboard Festival (蒙牛酸酸乳音樂風雲榜新人盛典)	Best Newcomer Group of the Year (Hong Kong & Taiwan)	Lollipop
2008	IFPI Hong Kong Album Sales Awards	Top 10 Selling Mandarin Albums of the Year	Gyashan (哪裡怕)
2008	IFPI Hong Kong Album Sales Awards	Top 10 Selling Mandarin Albums of the Year	Dream Embarks "Sparkling Taipei Arena" Concert
2009	Metro Radio Mandarin Music Awards	Best Group	Lollipop
2009	Metro Radio Mandarin Music Awards	Songs of the Year	I am Legend (我是傳奇)
2009	Metro Radio Mandarin Music Awards	Nation's Most Popular Group	Lollipop
2009	11th Mnet Asia Music Awards	Asia Recommendation Award (China)	Lollipop
2009	Metro Radio Hits Music Awards	Metro Best Voted Popularity Group	Lollipop
2009	TVB8 Awards (TVB8金曲榜)	Top Songs	Chang Jing Ge (藏經閣) – Lollipop
2009	Music Radio Top Music Charts Awards	Best Popularity Group (Hong Kong & Taiwan)	Lollipop

=== Lollipop F ===
Year	Award	Category	Recipient
2010	Metro Radio Mandarin Music Awards	Best Voted Popularity Group	Lollipop F
2010	Metro Radio Mandarin Music Awards	Asia Sing-Dance Group Grand Award	Lollipop F
2010	China Entertainment TV Asia Popularity Awards	Top Ten Asia Popularity Award	Lollipop F
2010	Taiwan Yahoo! Search Popularity Awards	Best Singing Group	Lollipop F
2010	Hong Kong Yahoo! Search Popularity Awards	Best Overseas Singing Group	Lollipop F
2010	Music Radio Top Music Charts Awards	Best Popularity Group (Hong Kong & Taiwan)	Lollipop F
2011	Super Star Talent Awards (超級巨星紅白藝能大賞)	Best Singer	Lollipop F
2011	Super Star Talent Awards (超級巨星紅白藝能大賞)	Top Ten Singer	Lollipop F
2011	IPFI Hong Kong Album Sales Awards	Top Ten Selling Mandarin Albums	Four Dimensions (四度空間) – Lollipop F
2011	Singapore e-Awards	Most Popular MV of the Year	Four Dimensions (四度空間) – Lollipop F
2011	Singapore e-Awards	Best Energetic Group of the Year	Lollipop F
2011	Music Radio Top Music Charts Awards	Best Popularity Group (Hong Kong & Taiwan)	Lollipop F
2011	Metro Radio Mandarin Music Awards	Top Metro Mandarin Songs	Four Dimensions (四度空間) – Lollipop F
2011	Metro Radio Mandarin Music Awards	Most Popular Metro Mandarin Group	Lollipop F
2011	Metro Radio Mandarin Music Awards	Asia's Best Sing-Dance Group	Lollipop F
2011	CNTV 8th Top Music Charts Awards (第八屆勁歌王金曲金榜頒獎典禮)	Best Popularity Group (Internet)	Lollipop F
2011	CNTV 8th Top Music Charts Awards (第八屆勁歌王金曲金榜頒獎典禮)	Best Popularity Group	Lollipop F
2011	MTV Mandarin Awards	Top Ten Popular Artistes of the Year	Lollipop F
2011	MTV Mandarin Awards	Best Popularity Group	Lollipop F
2011	Music Pioneer Billboard Awards (音樂先鋒榜頒獎典禮)	Best Dancing Group	Lollipop F
2011	Music Pioneer Billboard Awards (音樂先鋒榜頒獎典禮)	Best Popularity Band (Internet)	Lollipop F
2011	Taiwan Yahoo! Search Popularity Awards	Best Popularity Male Group	Lollipop F
2011	Hong Kong Yahoo! Search Popularity Awards	Best Overseas Group	Lollipop F
2011	TVB8 Awards (TVB8金曲榜)	Top Songs	Four Dimensions (四度空間) – Lollipop F
2011	TVB8 Awards (TVB8金曲榜)	Best Group (Silver)	Lollipop F
2012	Beijing Pop Music Awards	Best Popularity Group of the Year	Lollipop F
2012	YoungD Music Hits Charts (2011)	Top Pick Songs of the Year (Sixth)	Dance (電司) – Lollipop F
2012	YoungD Music Hits Charts (2011)	Best Group of the Year (Silver)	Lollipop F
2012	Sprite Music Charts Awards (2011)	Best Group (Taiwan)	Lollipop F
2012	16th Global Mandarin Music Charts (第16屆全球华语榜中榜)	Best Stage Award (Hong Kong & Taiwan)	Lollipop F
2012	Music Radio Top Music Charts Awards	Best Popularity Group (School Compound) (Hong Kong & Taiwan)	Lollipop F
2012	Music Radio Top Music Charts Awards	Best Popularity Group of the year (Hong Kong & Taiwan)	Lollipop F
2012	Let's Shake It! (東方衛視舞林大會)	Overall Second Runner's Up	Lollipop F
2012	Let's Shake It! (東方衛視舞林大會)	Best Voted Popularity Award	Lollipop F
2012	HITO Pop Music Awards	HITO Group Award	Lollipop F
2012	Pop Radio Best Dance Music Voting	Champion	Dance (電司) – Lollipop F
2012	2nd Global Pop Music Charts (第2屆全球流行音樂金榜)	Best Group of the Year	Lollipop F
2012	Milk Awards 2012	Best Popularity Group	Lollipop F
2012	Metro Radio Mandarin Music Awards	Best Metro Dance Music	Dance (電司) – Lollipop F
2012	Metro Radio Mandarin Music Awards	Best Popularity Group	Lollipop F
2012	Metro Radio Mandarin Music Awards	Asia's Best Sing-Dance Group	Lollipop F
2012	China Entertainment TV Asia's Top 10 Popularity Awards	Asia's Top 10 Popularity Award	Lollipop F
2013	TVB 2012 Top 10 Hits Awards (2012年度十大勁歌金曲頒獎典禮)	Asia-Pacific Region Best Male Popularity Award	Lollipop F
2013	TVB 2012 Top 10 Hits Awards (2012年度十大勁歌金曲頒獎典禮)	Most Popular Chinese Song (Silver)	Love Conquest (戰利品) – Lollipop F
