= Hallie Sargisson =

American politician

Member of the Iowa House of Representatives from the 24th district
- In office January 11, 1971 – January 7, 1973
- Preceded by: Keith Dunton
- Succeeded by: Edgar Holden

Personal details
- Born: January 1, 1907 Climbing Hill, Iowa
- Died: February 9, 2010 (aged 103) Sioux City, Iowa
- Party: Democratic

Hallie Sargisson (January 1, 1907 – February 9, 2010) was an American politician who served in the Iowa House of Representatives from the 24th district from 1971 to 1973.

She died on February 9, 2010, in Sioux City, Iowa at age 103.
