= Lolly (given name) =

- Gender: Unisex
- Language: English

Origin
- Meaning: Hypocorism for various names

Other names
- Related names: Loli

Lolly is a hypocorism for various given names, including the English name Laura. Young children often have difficulty in pronouncing the letter r, which resulted in nicknames like Lolly that substitute the letter l for r. Other examples include Dolly for Dorothy, Hallie for Harriet, Molly or Polly for Mary, and Sally for Sarah.

== Women ==
- Ololade "Lolly" Adefope (born c. 1990/1991), British stand-up comedian and actress of Nigerian descent
- Laura "Lolly" de Jonge (born 1960), Canadian Métis family advocate, corporate social responsibility practitioner, filmmaker and magazine founder
- Janet Gaynor, stage name of American actress Laura "Lolly" Gainor (1906–1984)
- Anna "Lolly" Kumble (born 1977), British singer, dancer and TV presenter of Indian and English descent
- Elizabeth "Lolly" Yeats (1868–1940), Anglo-Irish educator and publisher

== Men ==
- Emmanuel "Lolly" Borg (1931–2020), Maltese football player and manager
- Emmanuel "Lolly" Debattista (1929–2021), Maltese football player and manager
- Candido "Lolly" Vasquez-Vegas (1939–2010), American musician of Mexican and indigenous descent
- Emmanuel "Lolly" Vella (1933–2012), Australian footballer

== Fictional characters ==
- Shannon Louise "Lolly" Allen, a character on the Australian soap opera Neighbours
- Laura "Lolly" Willowes, a character in the 1926 novel Lolly Willowes by English writer Sylvia Townsend Warner
- Princess Lolly, a main character in the Candy Land board game series, who's a young fairy princess and King Kandy's daughter
- Lolly, a character who is Princess Bubblegum’s mechanical aunt in the animated series Adventure Time

== See also ==
- Loly
