= Lollipop discography =

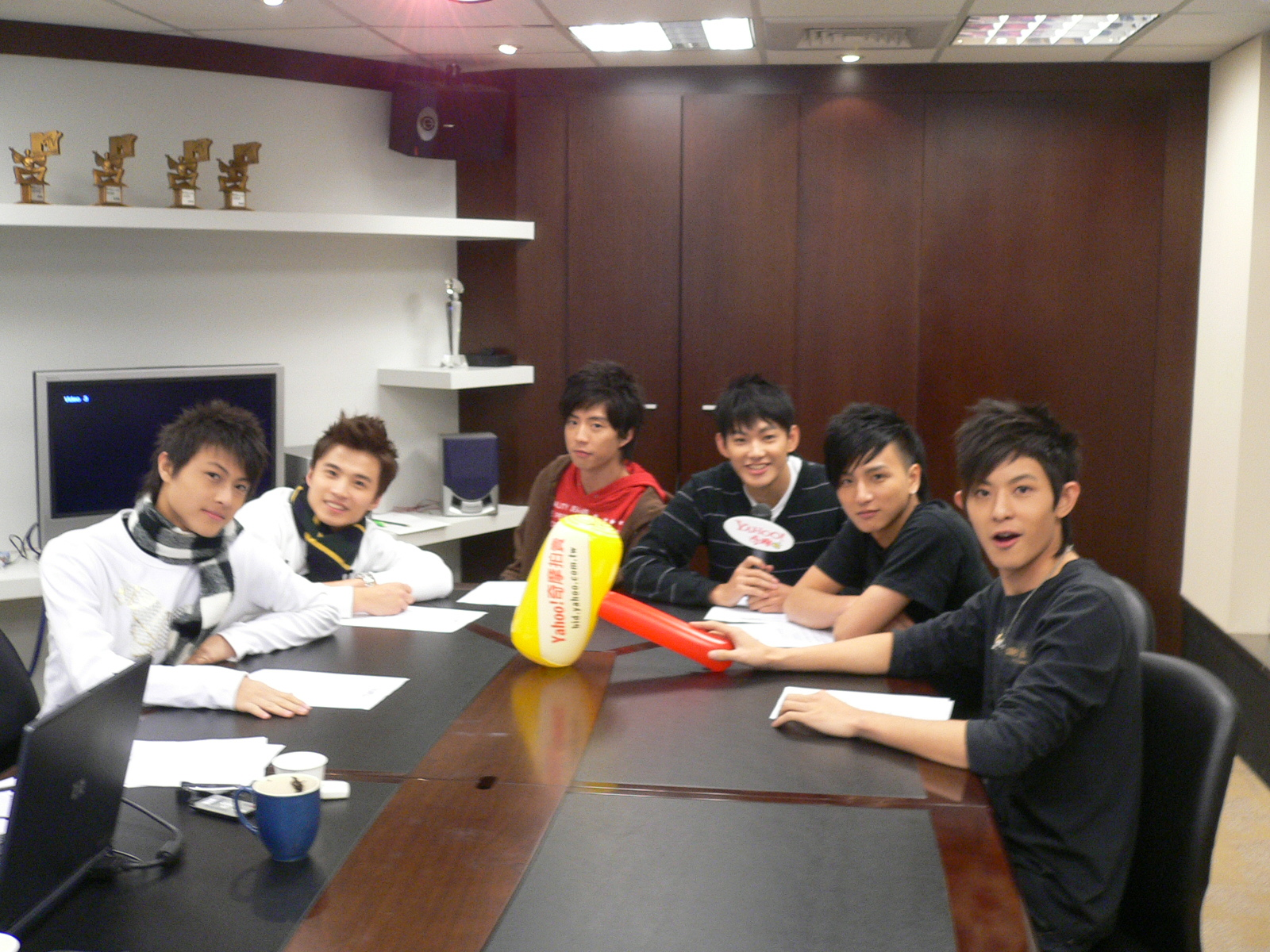
- The original six members of Lollipop in 2007
- Studio albums: 2
- EPs: 2
- Singles: 1
- Soundtrack contributions: 2
- Others: 3

Lollipop was a Taiwanese Mandopop boyband that released two studio albums, two EPs, one single and contributed to two soundtracks.

== History ==
In 2006, Channel V selected six people for the "Bang Bang Tang" (BBT), Taipei-based variety show. The six members of Lollipop selected and revealed in the November 27, 2006, episode were Liao Xiao Jie (Liljay/Brian), Qiu Wang Zi (Prince), Zhuang Ao Quan, Yang Xiao Yu (Fabien), Liao Wei Lian (William), and Liu A Wei.

The members signed with Channel V, with Dora Ao as their agent. The group signed with EMI Capitol on December 2, 2006. Lollipop's first public performance was on December 9, 2006, at the V-Power Music Storm Concert.

Their first single, Colorful Lollipop (七彩棒棒堂), was released on January 26, 2007. Two months later, on March 9, 2007, they released an EP and DVD version of their first single, Colorful Lollipop Commemorative Edition (七彩棒棒堂-無敵慶功版). On May 31, 2007, Lollipop released their second EP and DVD, Summer's First Experience (夏日初體驗), which includes a photobook compiled with photos taken in Okinawa, Japan.

On August 31, 2007, Lollipop released their first television soundtrack. The band were also part of the cast. Brown Sugar Macchiato OST consists of songs by Hey Girl and Lollipop, including two collaborative songs.

Lollipop's debut album Gyashan (哪裡怕) was released on December 28, 2007. Gyashan entered the Mandarin charts at number one, outselling F4's album Waiting for You – Await Your Love (在這裡等你), which was released on the same day. On January 26, 2008, a year after the release of their first EP, Lollipop held their debut concert at Taipei Arena. The concert DVD was released on 6 June 2008, breaking chart records by taking more than 35% of sales. The DVD topped the charts for a month following its release.

On October 3, 2008, Lollipop released their second television soundtrack. Some of the members were part of the main cast in the drama, while others had cameo roles. Again, the OST entitled The Legend of Brown Sugar Chivalries is a collaborative work by Hey Girl and Lollipop. Two editions were released for the soundtrack, one being a 10,000 copy limited edition.

Lollipop's second album I am Legend was released on June 19, 2009. A concert tour of Asia of the same name started at the Hong Kong Coliseum on July 4 and 5, 2009.

Lollipop's artist management contract with Channel [V] Taiwan ended at the close of 2009. Former Lollipop members, Qiu Wang Zi and Liao Xiao Jie left the company and created a new group, JPM, with Qiu's brother, Qiu Mao Di. The four remaining band members, Zhuang Ao Quan, Yang Xiao Yu, Liao Wei Lian, and Liu A Wei, re-created the group and called it Lollipop F.

== Studio albums ==
Year	#	Information	Track listing
2007	1st	Gyashan: Chinese: 哪裡怕; Pinyin: Nǎli Pà; Released: 28 December 2007; Label: EMI Music	Track listing: 1. YES; 2. 我們之間 (Between Us); 3. 夢想巴士 (Dream Bus); 4. 變身三分鐘 (Transform In Three Minutes); 5. 哪裡怕 (Where Fear); 6. 幸福就好 (Happiness Is Good); 7. 跟著我的Tempo (Follow My Tempo); 8. 我已經長大 (I've Grown Up); 9. 那一天 (That Day); 10. Make Me a Fool
2008	1st	Gyashan: Chinese: 哪裡怕 – 限量炫光珍藏版; Pinyin: Nǎli Pà – Xiàn Liàng Xuàn Guāng Zhēn Cáng Bǎn; Released: 1 February 2008; Label: EMI Music	Track listing: 1. YES; 2. 我們之間 (Between Us); 3. 夢想巴士 (Dream Bus); 4. 變身三分鐘 (Transform In Three Minutes); 5. 哪裡怕 (Where Fear); 6. 幸福就好 (Happiness Is Good); 7. 跟著我的Tempo (Follow My Tempo); 8. 我已經長大 (I've Grown Up); 9. 那一天 (That Day); 10. Make Me a Fool
2009	2nd	I Am Legend: Chinese: 我是傳奇; Pinyin: Wŏ Shì Chuán Qí; Released: 19 June 2009; Label: Gold Typhoon	Track listing: 1. 我是傳奇 (I Am Legend); 2. 夏日戀愛 (Summer Love); 3. 綜藝咖 (Variety Coffee); 4. 說說 (Comedian); 5. 交換日記 (Exchange Diaries); 6. Loga Loga; 7. 衝破封鎖線 (Breaking the Blockade); 8. 少了妳的房間 (Your Room Less); 9. 吵鬧的沉默 (Noisy Silence); 10. One Way
2009	2nd	Lollipop's I am Legend + Choc7's Sonic Youth: Chinese: 卒業紀念限定盤 (合體雙拼改版); Pinyin: Cù Yè Jì Niàn Xiàn Dìng Pán (Gĕ Tĭ Shuāng Pīn Găi Băn); Released: 14 August 2009; Label: Gold Typhoon	Track listing: 1. 我是傳奇 (I Am Legend); 2. 夏日戀愛 (Summer Love); 3. 綜藝咖 (Variety Coffee); 4. 說說 (Comedian); 5. 交換日記 (Exchange Diaries); 6. Loga Loga; 7. 衝破封鎖線 (Breaking the Blockade); 8. 少了妳的房間 (Your Room Less); 9. 吵鬧的沉默 (Noisy Silence); 10. One Way

== EPs ==
Year	#	Information	Track listing
2007	1st	Colorful Lollipop – Special Edition: Chinese: 七彩棒棒堂 – 無敵慶功版; Pinyin: Qī Cǎi Bàng Bàng Táng – Wú Dí Qìng Gōng Bǎn; Released: 9 March 2008; Label: EMI Music	Track listing: 1. 七彩棒棒堂 Qi Cai Bang Bang Tang" (Colorful Lollipop); 2. 梦想号 Meng Xiang Hao" (Dreamers' Society); 3. 爱情学测 Ai Qing Xue Ce" (Love Measure Study); 4. 七彩棒棒堂 Qi Cai Bang Bang Tang - remix" (Colorful Lollipop remix); 5. 梦想号 Meng Xiang Hao - remix" (Dreamers' Society remix)
2007	2nd	Summer's First Experience: Chinese: 夏日初體驗; Pinyin: Xià Rì Chū Tǐ Yàn; Released: 25 May 2007; Label: EMI Music	

== Singles ==
Year	#	Information
2007	1st	Colorful Lollipop: Chinese: 七彩棒棒堂; Pinyin: Qī Cǎi Bàng Bàng Táng; Released: 26 January 2007; Label: EMI Music

== Soundtrack contributions ==
Year	#	Information	Track listing
2007	1st	Brown Sugar Macchiato OST: Chinese: 黑糖瑪奇朵 偶像劇原聲帶; Released: 6 September 2007; Label: EMI Music	Track listing: CD; 1. Intro - "黑糖變奏" (Brown Sugar Variation) - Instrumental; 2. "黑糖秀" (Hei Tang Xiu) (Brown Sugar PK Show) - opening theme by Lollipop and Hey Girl; 3. "苦茶七分甜" (Bitter Sweet Guitar) - Instrumental; 4. "微酸協奏曲" (Concerto of Macchiato) - Instrumental; 5. "愛情瑪奇朵" (Ai Qing Ma Qi Duo) (Love Macchiato) by Lollipop; 6. "水晶瑪琪朵" (Crystal Macchiato) - Instrumental; 7. "黑糖放電" (Charm of Brown Sugar) - Instrumental; 8. "Hello愛情風" (Hello Breeze of Love) - insert song by Hey Girl; 9. "晶凍苦茶" (Crystal Tea) - Instrumental; 10. "搖滾吧！愛情" (Rockn' Love) - Instrumental; 11. "暴走豬頭" (Crazy Love Bozo) - Instrumental; 12. "大豬頭" (Love Bozo) - insert song by Lollipop; 13. "甘草豬頭" (Comic Bozo) - Instrumental; 14. "瑪琪朵奏嗚曲" (Macchiato Sonata) - Instrumental; 15. "苦茶" (Bitter Sweet) - insert song by Lollipop and Hey Girl; DVD; 1. Brown Sugar drama highlights 2. A day in the life of Brown Sugar Macchiato; 3. Brown Sugar Macchiato Interview; 4. Brown Sugar Macchiato - Lollipop adventure 5. "黑糖秀" (Hei Tang Xiu) (Brown Sugar PK Show) MV; 6. "愛情瑪奇朵" (Love Macchiato) MV; 7. "大豬頭" (Love Bozo) MV
2008	2nd	The Legend of Brown Sugar Chivalries OST: Chinese: 黑糖群俠傳電視原聲帶; Released: 6 October 2008; Label: EMI Music	Track listing: 1. 藏經閣 (Cang Jing Ge) by Lollipop; 2. 對不起 (I'm Sorry) by Wang Zi; 3. 秘密基地(Secret Base) by Lollipop; 4. Dear Baby by Lollipop and Hey Girl; 5. 只要你還記得 (As Long As You Remember) by Fabien; 6. 衝進藏經閣 (Instrumental); 7. 藏經閣之秋 (Instrumental); 8. 真的很抱歉 (Instrumental); 9. Sorry遊樂園 (Instrumental); 10. 我不是故意的 (Instrumental); 11. Our Base (Instrumental); 12. 前往下一站 (Instrumental); 13. Dear Honey Baby (Instrumental); 14. Pizzicato Baby (Instrumental); 15. 記得那年的旅行嗎？(Instrumental); 16. 我不會忘記 (Instrumental)

== Others ==
=== Music Videos ===
Year	Song	Album	Additional Information
2007	"七彩棒棒堂" (Colorful Lollipop)	Colorful Lollipop	
2007	"爱情学测 Ai Qing Xue Ce" (Love Test)	Colorful Lollipop	
2007	"梦想号 Meng Xiang Hao" (Dream Number)	Colorful Lollipop	
2007	"夏日初體驗 Xia Ri Chu Ti Yan" (Summer's First Experience)	Summer's First Experience	
2007	"黑糖秀 Hei Tang Xiu" (Brown Sugar Show)	Brown Sugar Macchiato OST	Opening theme song of Brown Sugar Macchiato drama with Hey Girl
2007	"愛情瑪奇朵 Ai Qing Ma Qi Duo" (Love Macchiato)	Brown Sugar Macchiato OST	Ending theme song of Brown Sugar Macchiato drama
2007	"大豬頭 Da Zhu Tou" (Big Fool)	Brown Sugar Macchiato OST	
2007	"YES!"	Gyashan	
2007	"我們之間 Wo Men Zhi Jian" (Between Us)	Gyashan	
2008	"哪裡怕" (Where Fear)	Gyashan	
2008	"夢想巴士 Meng Xiang Ba Shi" (Dream Bus)	Gyashan	
2008	"跟著我的Tempo Gen Zhe Wo De Tempo" (Follow My Tempo)	Gyashan	Arena Concert Clips
2008	"那一天 Na Yi Tian" (That Day)	Gyashan	Arena Concert Clips
2008	"變身三分鐘 Bian Shen San Fen Zhong" (Transform in 3 Minutes)	Gyashan	Arena Concert Clips
2008	"藏經閣 Cang Jing Ge"	The Legend of Brown Sugar Chivalries OST	Opening theme song of The Legend of Brown Sugar Chivalries drama
2008	"秘密基地 Mi Mi Ji Di" (Secret Base)	The Legend of Brown Sugar Chivalries OST	Ending theme song for the second half of The Legend of Brown Sugar Chivalries drama
2009	"Make Me A Fool"	Gyashan	Yang Xiao Yu (Fabien)'s solo song; directed by Liu A Wei
2009	"我是傳奇 Wo Shi Chuan Qi" (I Am Legend)	I Am Legend	
2009	"綜藝咖" (Variety Coffee)	I Am Legend	
2009	"夏日戀愛 Xia Ri Lian Ai" (Summer Love)	I Am Legend	
2009	"說說 Zong Yi Ka" (Comedian)	I Am Legend	

=== DVDs ===
Type	Number	Name	Release date	Label
Concert DVDs	1st	The Dream Embarks – Sparkling Taipei Arena Concert: Chinese: 夢想出發 – 閃耀小巨蛋演唱會; Pinyin: Mèng Xiǎng Chū Fā – Shǎn Yào Xiǎo Jù Dàn Yǎn Chàng Huì	6 June 2008	EMI Music

=== Concert Performances ===
==== Lollipop's Concerts ====
Date	English name	Chinese name	Notes
26 January 2008	Lollipop Taipei Arena Concert	哪裡怕 台北小巨蛋演唱會	*Debut concert
4–5 July 2009	Lollipop "I am Legend" Asia Tour: Hong Kong	棒棒堂《我是傳奇》亞洲巡迴演唱會- 香港站	*First stop of Asia Tour
12 December 2009	Lollipop "I am Legend" Asia Tour: Guangzhou	棒棒堂《我是傳奇》亞洲巡迴演唱會- 廣州站	
25 December 2009	Lollipop "I am Legend" Asia Tour: Beijing	棒棒堂《我是傳奇》亞洲巡迴演唱會- 北京站	

==== Large Concerts ====
Date	English name	Chinese name	Notes
9 December 2006	V-Power Music Storm Concert	V-Power 音樂風暴演唱會	*First public performance as Lollipop: Hosted by Channel V and leTea
9 June 2007	Kaoshiung LeParty	高雄樂派對	*Hosted by Channel V and leTea
27 October 2007	MTV Concert	MTV樂翻天演唱會	*Hosted by MTV and leTea
1 January 2008	New Year's Eve concert dance Taichung	舞动台中跨年演唱会	
1 January 2008	New Year's Eve concert in Taoyuan	桃园跨年演唱会	
1 March 2008	2008 HITO Music Awards Concert	2008 HITO流行音樂獎暨萬人演唱會	*Hosted by Hit FM
1 June 2008	Artistes 512 Fundraising Campaign	演藝界512關愛行動	*Fundraising campaign in Hong Kong for the Sichuan earthquake
4 July 2008	Maokong Gondola Concert	貓纜演唱會	*Hosted by TRTC
29 November 2008	V-Power Love Music Concert	V-Power 愛音樂演唱會	*Hosted by Channel V and McDonald's
1 January 2009	Eighth Shenzhen Happy Valley Music Festival, Shenzhen Radio, Film and Television Group, New Year's Eve Concert	深圳欢乐谷第八届音乐节、深圳广播电影电视集团跨年演唱會	
31 January 2009	Kaoshiung Lantern Festival Opening Night	犇牛迎世運‧高雄愛幸福「開幕之夜」	*Hosted by Kaoshiung city government
6 October 2009	11th Chinese/Korean Music Festival	第十一屆中韓歌會	*Performance in Qingdao

==== Guest appearances ====
Type of Concert	Date	English name	Chinese name	Notes
Guest Appearances	21 April 2007	Stefanie Sun celebratory concert	孫燕姿慶功演唱會	*Guest
Guest Appearances	23 February 2008	Show Lo Show on Stage Concert – Hong Kong	羅志祥一支獨秀演唱會 – 香港站	*Guest for first HK show: First concert performance in Hong Kong
Guest Appearances	1 November 2008	"We are Friends" FanFan Concert	我們是朋友 范瑋琪 2008巡迴演唱會	*Guest for Taipei show
Guest Appearances	19 August 2009	Fan Fan F.One "We are Friends" Concert	范瑋琪F.one我們是朋友香港北京巡迴演唱會	*Guest for Hong Kong show

== See also ==
- Lollipop F
- JPM
