= Sally Meyer =

Sally, Sally Meyer or just Meyer was a silent movie slapstick character played by Ernst Lubitsch, before he moved to Hollywood. The character was an antisemitic satire of a Jewish businessman.

Meyer was portrayed as a stereotypical Jew who cannot be trusted and haggles about everything. He is also adulterous towards his wife.

When Ernst Lubitsch first became involved in the film industry, he starred in slapstick comedies which poked fun at Jewish stereotypes. He performed these roles as an actor in such films as Die Firma heiratet (1914), Der Stolz der Firma (1914), Schuhpalast Pinkus (1916), Der schwarze Moritz (1916). In Shoe Palace Pinkus (1916) Lubitsch first performed as a character named "Sally Pinkus", a Jewish boy who prefers being lazy and acting as a class clown instead of working for school. He cheats on his tests and chases girls. Der Fall Rosentopf (1918) featured the character Sally once again. He was named Sally Meyer in the film Meyer aus Berlin (1918), which is the official debut of the character.

During the First World War and during the 1920s the character was very popular, especially in Germany, where the films were made. Most films were only four reels long. After Lubitsch moved to Hollywood, he stopped making films about the character.

Today the films about Meyer are almost forgotten, also due to the controversial antisemitism in the storylines. For many years the film Meyer aus Berlin was thought to be lost, but it was discovered in Dutch film archives under the title Sally geht auf Reisen.
