= Lolly =

Lolly may refer to:

== Food ==
- Lolly, a short form of lollipop (a kind of confectionery on a stick)
- lolly, also ice lolly or lolly ice, another term for ice pop
- Lolly, in Australian and New Zealand English, a piece of what is called candy in American English or sweets in British English

== Art, entertainment, and media ==
- Lolly Allen, a fictional character in the Australian soap opera Neighbours
- Lolly Talk, a Hong Kong girl group
- Lolly Whitehill, a recurring character in the television series Orange Is the New Black
- "Lolly" (song), a 2013 song by Maejor Ali, featuring Juicy J and Justin Bieber
- "Lolly, Lolly, Lolly, Get Your Adverbs Here", a song from Schoolhouse Rock

== People ==
- Lolly (given name)
- Lolly (singer) (born 1977), British pop star
- Lolly Adefope, British comedian
- Emmanuel Lolly Debattista (1929–2021), Maltese soccer player and manager
- Candido "Lolly" Vasquez-Vegas, former guitarist and vocalist of the band Redbone
- Emmanuel Lolly Vella (1933-2012), Australian association footballer
- Elizabeth Yeats (1868-1940) nicknamed Lolly, British book publisher, sister of the poet W. B. Yeats
- Lolly, a character who is Princess Bubblegum’s mechanical aunt in the animated series Adventure Time

== Other uses ==
- Lolly Moor, a reserve in Norfolk, England

== See also ==
- Lollipop (disambiguation)
- Jolly Ranchers
