= Hallie Beachem Brooks =

African-American library science educator (1907–1985)

Hallie Beachem Brooks (1907–1985) was a prominent African-American librarian, educator, and academic who worked to advance literacy and educational opportunities for African-Americans. She was a Professor of Library Science at Atlanta University, published numerous book reviews, and mentored African-American library students.

== Education ==
Brooks earned a certificate from the Indiana State Public Library Training Course in 1924. She earned an AB from Butler University in 1934 and a BLS from Columbia University in 1940. Brooks received her MA from the University of Chicago in 1946 with a thesis entitled "A description of Negro news-stand magazines and an analysis of the contents of a selected number of Negro magazines".

== Career ==
In 1942, Brooks joined Atlanta University as a part-time faculty member. She was also at this time the librarian to the Atlanta University Laboratory Elementary School and enrolled as a summer student at the University of Chicago. From 1942 to 1944, she directed a library field service program funded by the Carnegie Corporation, which offered resources and consultation to southern regional libraries seeking to improve their coverage and services to African-Americans.

In 1946, Brooks was promoted to a full-time position at Atlanta University. In 1948, she was promoted to assistant professor. In addition to teaching, she continued to work for the Atlanta University Laboratory Elementary Schools, and by 1952, she was the Library Supervisor there. In 1954, Brooks went on sabbatical, and spent some of her time touring and learning from European libraries and presses. In 1957, she was promoted to the rank of associate professor. In 1959, Brooks was promoted to the rank of professor. In 1965, Brooks edited a conference proceedings entitled The role of the library in improving education in the South. In 1977, Brooks retired from Atlanta University after 47 years of service. In 1983, she was awarded Emerita status.

== Legacy ==
Atlanta University Department of Library Sciences periodically awards a scholarship in her honor.

== Publications ==
- A description of Negro news-stand magazines and an analysis of the contents of a selected number of Negro magazines. MA Thesis. 1946.
- The role of the library in improving education in the South; papers. 1965: Atlanta University. (OCoLC)609447924
- Lovers of Freedom Will Be Free. Book Review, "Amos Fortune, Free Man by Elizabeth Yates; Stories of the Underground Railroad by Anna L. Curtis". Phylon, Vol. 12, No. 1, 1951. DOI: 10.2307/272330
- Play Songs of the Deep South by Altona Trent Johns. Book Review. Phylon, Vol. 6, No. 2 (2nd Qtr, 1945), p. 193
- Notes of a Native Son by James Baldwin. Book Review. Phylon, Vol. 21, No. 3 (3rd Qtr., 1960), pp. 296–297
- Meet North Africa by John Gunther, Sam Epstein, Beryl Epstein. Book Review. The Phylon Quarterly, Vol. 19, No. 2 (2nd Qtr, 1958), p. 237
- The First Book of Negroes by Langston Hughes. Book Review. Phylon, Vol. 14, No. 3 (3rd Qtr, 1953), pp. 343–344
- A Look down the Lonesome Road: What a Liberal Living amid Segregationists Can Do, Say and Accomplish by Ralph Creger, Erwin McDonald. Book Review. Phylon, Vol. 25, No. 4 (4th Qtr, 1964), pp. 414–415
- Belafonte: An Unauthorized Biography by Arnold Shaw. Book Review. Phylon, Vol. 21, No. 3 (3rd Qtr, 1960), pp. 294–296
- Oral History Interview, recording of Hallie Beachem Brooks by E. Bernard West.
