= Healthy Village =

Public housing estate in Hong Kong

Coordinates: 22.29126°N 114.20624°E

- Chinese: 健康村
- Cantonese Yale: Gihn hōng chyūn
Transcriptions
Standard Mandarin
- Hanyu Pinyin: Jiànkāng Cūn
Yue: Cantonese
- Yale Romanization: Gihn hōng chyūn
- Jyutping: Gin6 hong1 cyun1

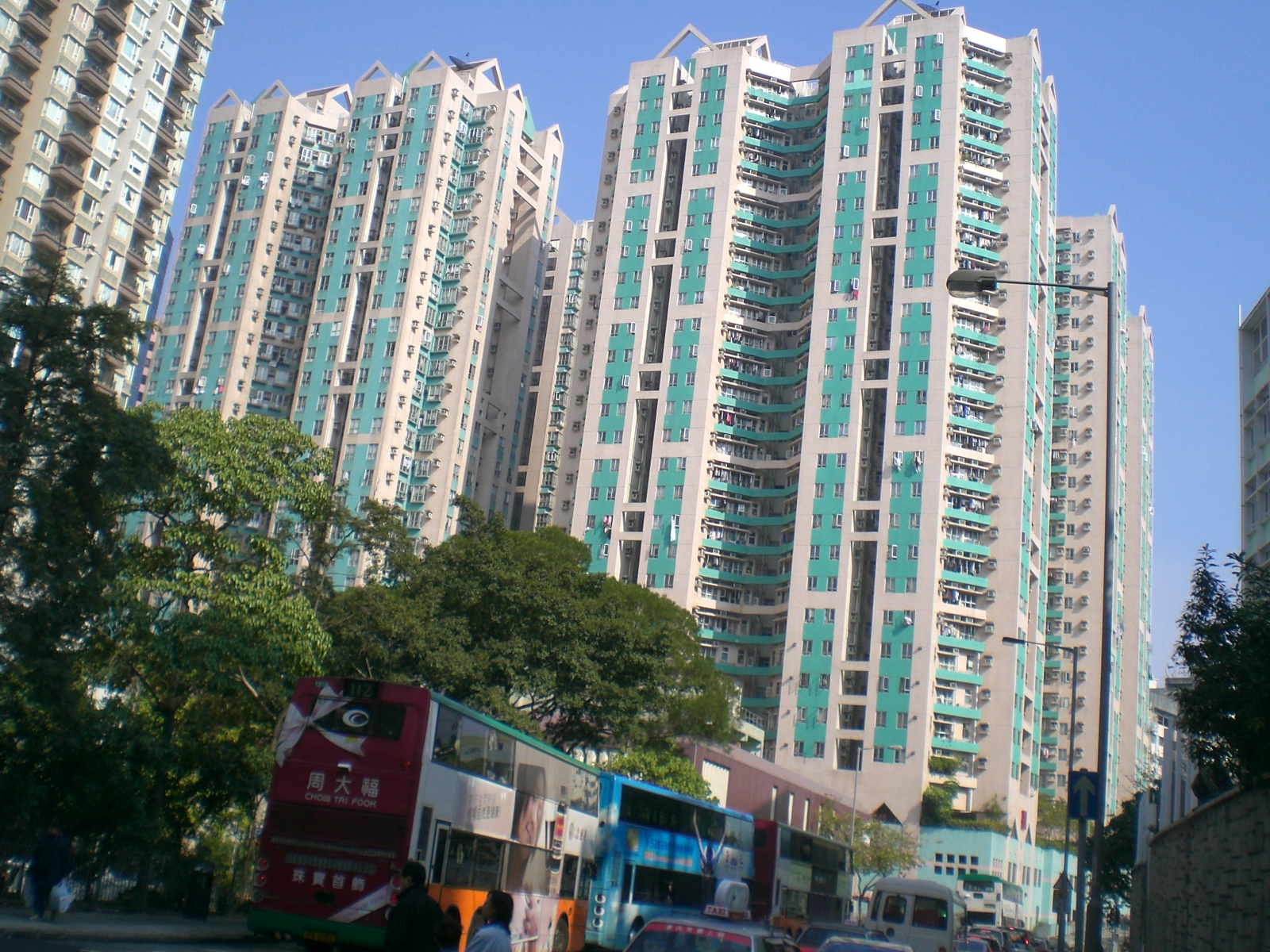
Healthy Village Phase 1 and 2

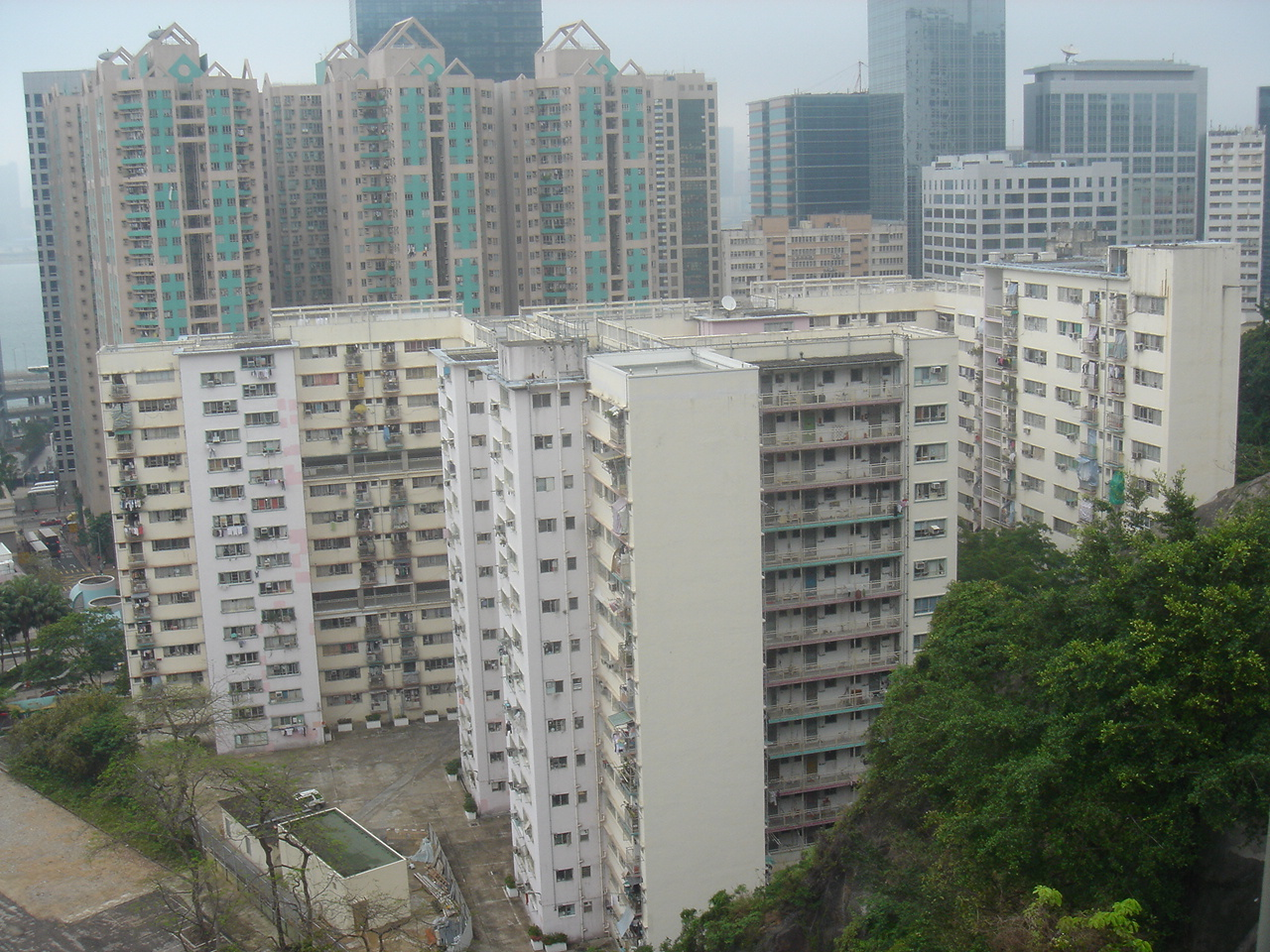
Healthy Village Phase 3

Healthy Village is a public housing estate and Flat-for-Sale Scheme estate in Tsat Tsz Mui, Hong Kong, developed by the Hong Kong Housing Society. It is divided into 3 phases and located at Tsat Tsz Mui Road (Redeveloped Phase 1, flat for rental and sale), King's Road (Redeveloped Phase 2, flat for sale) and Pak Fuk Road (Redeveloped Phase 3, flat for rental) respectively. It consists of 14 residential blocks (4 for Phase 1, 3 for Phase 2, 7 for Phase 3) completed between 1965 and 1997.

== Background ==
The site of Healthy Village was formerly a squatter area. The area was cleared in the 1950s and the site was handed over to Hong Kong Housing Society for the development of rental housing. Phase 1, located at King's Road, had two blocks built in 1955. Phase 2, located at Tsat Tsz Mui Road, had three blocks built in 1959. Phase 3, located at Pak Fuk Road, had seven blocks built in 1965.

Phase 2 was firstly demolished in 1990 and replaced by 4 blocks of Redeveloped Phase 1 in 1993. Two of the blocks are for rental while the other two are for sale. Phase 1 was then demolished in 1993 and replaced by 3 blocks of Redeveloped Phase 2 in 1997. All 3 blocks are for sale. However, Phase 3 blocks built in 1965 have not been redeveloped yet.

== Houses ==
Name	Phase	Type	Completion
Pak Yeung Lau	Phase 3	rental	1965
Ngan Hang Lau	Phase 3	rental	1965
Hung To Lau	Phase 3	rental	1965
Luk Yip Lau	Phase 3	rental	1965
Chung Shu Lau	Phase 3	rental	1965
Lam Cheuk Lau	Phase 3	rental	1965
Wong Kuk Lau	Phase 3	rental	1965
Hong Wang Court	Redeveloped Phase 1	rental	1993
Hong Fai Court	Redeveloped Phase 1	rental	1993
Hong Tai Court	Redeveloped Phase 1	sale	1993
Hong Chi Court	Redeveloped Phase 1	sale	1993
Hong Cheung Court	Redeveloped Phase 2	sale	1997
Hong Yan Court	Redeveloped Phase 2	sale	1997
Hong Shing Court	Redeveloped Phase 2	sale	1997

== Demographics ==
According to the 2016 by-census, Healthy Village had a population of 5,227. The median age was 51.4 and the majority of residents (94 per cent) were of Chinese ethnicity. The average household size was 2.4 people. The median monthly household income of all households (i.e. including both economically active and inactive households) was HK$29,000.

== Politics ==
Healthy Village is located in Healthy Village constituency of the Eastern District Council. It was formerly represented by James Pui Chi-lap, who was elected in the 2019 elections until July 2021.
