= Minutes to Fame =

- Genre: Game show
- Starring: Hong Kong celebrities and citizens
- Country of origin: Hong Kong
- Original language: Cantonese

Production
- Running time: approx. 45 minutes

Original release
- Network: Television Broadcasts Limited
- Release: February 5, 2005

Minutes to Fame (Chinese: 殘酷一叮) is a game show-style talent contest from Hong Kong. It was a weekly program presented by Television Broadcasts Limited (TVB) and broadcast on TVB Jade in three series from February 2005 to August 2007. The show is intended to be satirical and funny since most of the contestants are inexperienced and are trying to get famous.

The show was hosted by Hacken Lee and Joey Leung in the first two seasons, who both acted as two of its judges. They were replaced by Miriam Yeung and Sammy Leung for the third season. All three seasons featured one or more guest judges in each episode, which varied between episodes.

== Background ==
Inspired by the Idols franchise, the show gave ordinary Hongkongers the opportunity to appear as contestants on stage to sing and perform. Its slogan was "全城盡興，殘酷一叮！" (The whole city (Hong Kong) gets excited for the minutes to fame). The show had received top ratings, and the finals of the first series, on 4 June 2005, reached 33 points on the charts. It has led to the creation of several spinoffs by other Chinese television stations, including Asia TV and Guangdong Television, and to collaboration with other mainland Chinese television stations to provide contestants for their own shows, such as CCTV's China Dream Show.

The program was among TVB's first to recruit competitors from overseas. Starting from May 2005, primaries were not only held in Hong Kong, but also in Guangzhou, Macau, Toronto, Taipei, Shanghai, Singapore, Sydney etc. Similarly, the European branch of TVB, TVB-S Europe, held a Minutes to Fame contest in Paris and Rotterdam on August 28, 2005, and August 29, 2005, respectively. The winner of both contests proceeded in a Minutes to Fame special later that year, where contestants from all over the world competed.

== Format ==
Each episode featured a number of contestants whose objective was to remain on stage for as long as possible. Their act must involve singing one of eight randomly selected songs for each episode, which included Cantopop, Mandopop, and even English-language popular music. Besides singing, contestants may also choose to enhance their act by playing an instrument, acrobatics, magic, etc.

At any point during their performance, any of the judges may strike a gong on the table in front of them, at which point the contestant must stop singing. Their score was determined by the duration of their performance, in seconds, excluding the introduction, and each second is worth HK$100 in prize money. At the conclusion of each episode, the contestant with the longest act by duration was the night's winner and qualified for subsequent rounds, and eventually the final round, "Battle for the King" (叮皇爭霸戰).

While the show was meant to be competitive, judges had been harsh to contestants that they "ding" out, and often make fun of them directly. A laugh track was heavily used instantly whenever one-liners or off-key singing was present, supplementing the studio audience's reactions. But sometimes it happened when the contestant was singing well but had an unusual appearance. Note that most Hong Kong variety shows use laugh tracks heavily for network purposes.

== Judges and guest judges ==
=== Season 1 ===
1	Hacken Lee, Joey Leung
2	Andy Lau
3	Edmond Leung
4	Liza Wang
5	Twins
6	Miriam Yeung
7	Carol Cheng
8	Nancy Sit
9	Joey Yung
10	Jade Kwan, Warren Mok
11	Eric Kwot (葛民輝)
12	Cheung Tat-ming (張達明)
13	Dicky Cheung
14	Michael Miu, Candice Yu (余安安)
15	Niki Chow, Jerry Lamb
16	Vincent Kuk (谷德昭), Bernice Liu
17	Alan Tam
Hegemony war episode	Natalis Chan, Gigi Leung

=== Season 2 ===
1	Eason Chan
2	Leo Ku
3	Patrick Tam, Ada Choi
4	Chin Kar-lok, Yumiko Cheng
5	Adam Cheng, Nicolas Tse
6	Denise Ho, Bosco Wong
7	Jessica Hsuan, Roger Kwok
8	Wong He, Kenix Kwok
9	David Lui (呂方)
10	Cathy Chui (徐子淇)
11	Halina Tam
12	Kelly Chen
13	Sam Lee
14	Grasshopper
15	Ekin Cheng
hegemony war episode II	Jordan Chan, Dayo Wong
imperial hegemony war	Aaron Kwok

=== Season 3 ===
1	Leo Ku
2	David Lui (呂方)
3	Roger Kwok
4	Harlem Yu
5	Fish Leong
6	Eric Suen (孫耀威), Gia Lin (林苑)
7	Grasshopper
8	Lo Ka-ying (羅家英)
9	Ron Ng, Tavia Yeung
10	Bernice Liu, Bosco Wong
11	Andy Hui
12	Denise Ho
13	Cheung Tat-Ming (張達明)
14	Stephen Fung, Amanda S. (模特兒)
15	Ella Koon, Nancy Sit, Charles Ying
imperial hegemony war	Hacken Lee, Joey Leung

== Awards ==
- TVB Anniversary Awards (2005)
  - Won: Best Variety or Informative Show
  - Won: Most Creative Program
    - Television Broadcast Limited ©MMV

http://www.tvb.com

== See also ==
- The Gong Show, another "survival type" talent competition
- The Voice, a more traditional successor
