= Tsat Tsz Mui Road =

Road in Hong Kong

Coordinates: 22.29143°N 114.20491°E

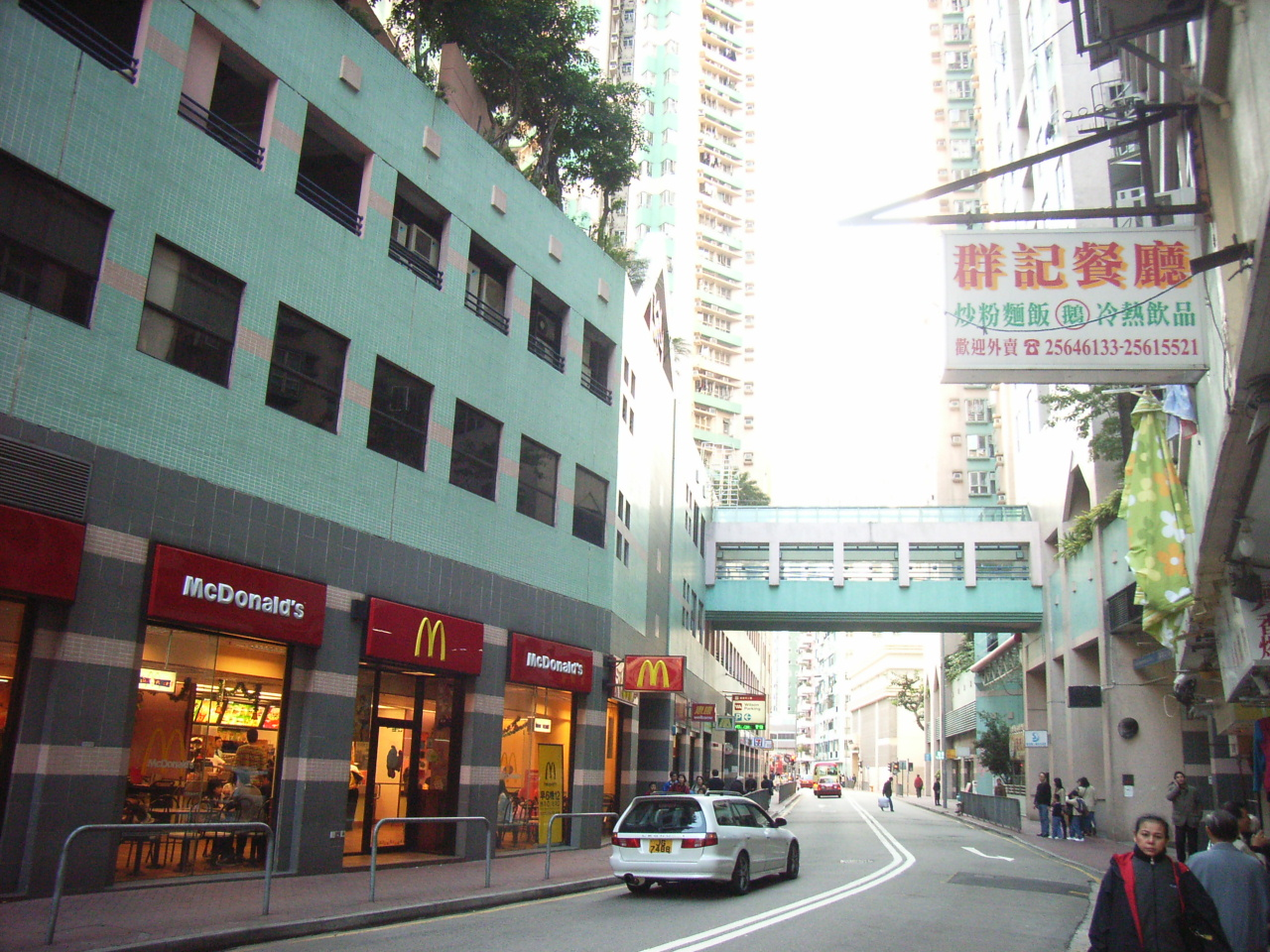
Part of the road in east.

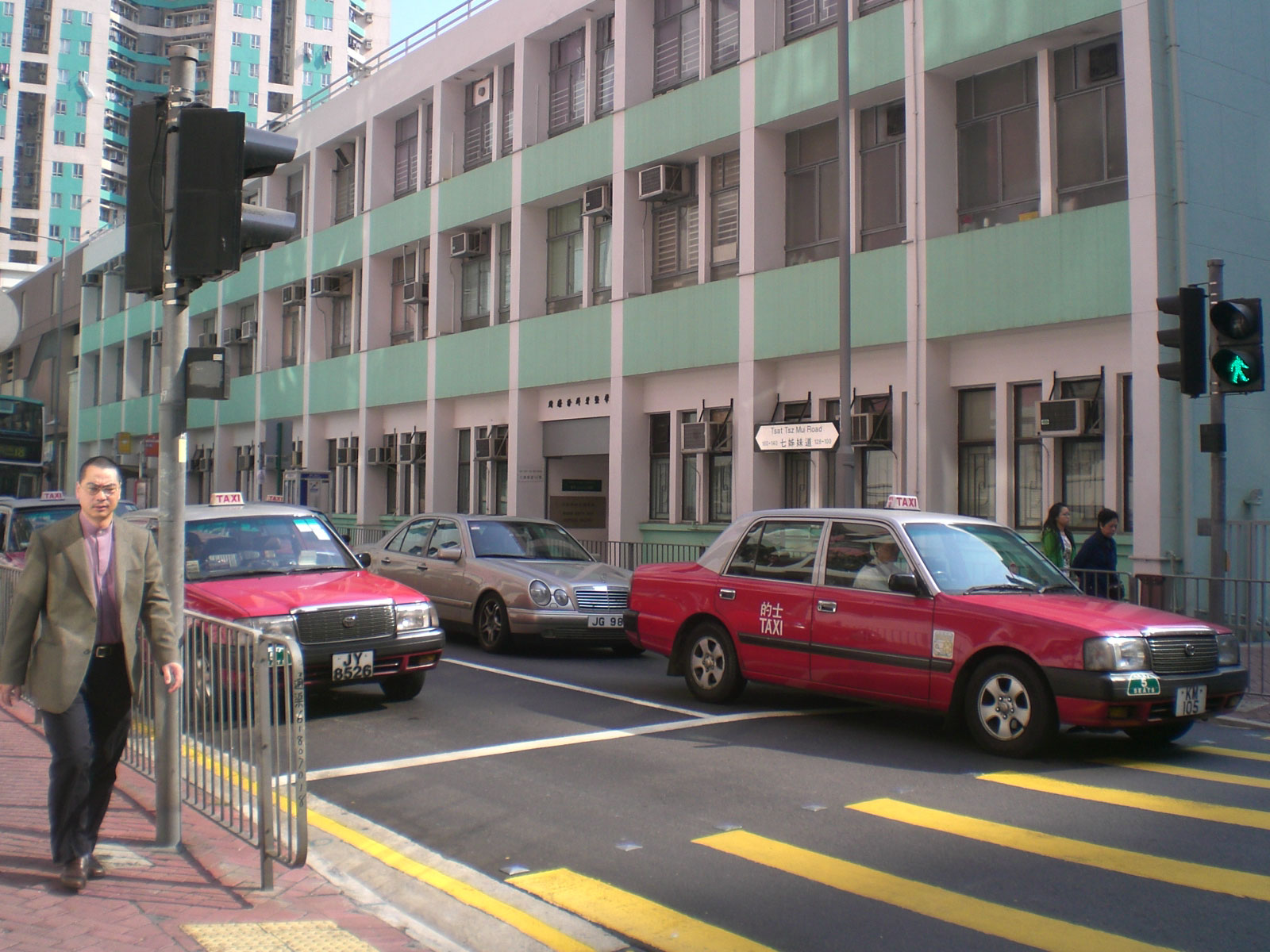
Tsat Tsz Mui Road

Tsat Tsz Mui Road (Chinese: 七姊妹道; pinyin: Qīzǐmèi Dào; Cantonese Yale: chat1 ji2 mui2 dou6; lit. 'Seven Sisters Road') is a road in Tsat Tsz Mui in Hong Kong. The road runs in the area of Tsat Tsz Mui and eastern North Point from west to east, parallel to King's Road, except disjoint by a residential-commercial complex of Island Place.

== Name ==
The road named after the Tsat Tsz Mui, which means "seven sisters".

== History ==
From 1911, the shore of Tsat Tsz Mui hosted bathing pavilions, including Hong Kong's largest. Another (apparently), opened by the South China Athletic Association in 1929, was destroyed by the Japanese occupiers in 1941. In 1934, the Hong Kong Government began to develop Tsat Tsz Mui and a new road was built. Tsat Tsz Mui Road was completed on 15 December 1939. Starting with a short section between Kam Hong Street and Shu Kuk Street, the road was later extended to Model Housing Estate. The section was split into two when a bus depot was built between Tin Chiu Street and Kam Hong Street.

== See also ==
- List of streets and roads in Hong Kong
