= Ken Choi (singer) =

- Choi in 1999
- Born: 28 November 1960 (age 65); Hong Kong
- Education: University of Macau
- Occupations: Singer, television and radio host
- Years active: 1979–1989, 2010–present

Chinese name
- Traditional Chinese: 蔡楓華
- Simplified Chinese: 蔡枫华
Transcriptions
Standard Mandarin
- Hanyu Pinyin: Cài Fēng-huá
Yue: Cantonese
- Jyutping: Coi3 Fung1-waa4
- Musical career
- Also known as: Prince Charming; Kan-choi (it means that celery is a rhyme of his name in Chinese; 芹菜); Hong Kong Tamaki Hiroshi; Prince Red Lips
- Genres: Cantopop
- Instruments: Vocals, guitar
- Label: Sony Music

Kenneth Choi Fung-Wah (Chinese: 蔡楓華; Jyutping: coi^{3} fung^{1} waa^{4}; born 28 November 1960) is a singer and actor from Hong Kong. Before his music career, he worked at a summer job for approximately HK$20. He enrolled in a radio singing contest and won HK$3,000. He composed the music for the 1981 song, "Beautiful Silhouette" (倩影, "Sin Ying"), which won an award at the 1981 RTHK Top 10 Gold Songs Awards. Caron (卡龍) wrote the lyrics of the song.

At the 1985 Jade Solid Gold Best Ten Music Awards Presentation, when Leslie Cheung won three awards, Choi—who was one of the hosts of the awards show—responded, "A moment of glory is not eternal (剎那光輝唔代表永恒)," which sparked controversy. After the remark, his career declined in the rest of 1980s. He was reported to have lived with his mother in Kam Tin since. In 2000s and thereafter, Choi made several comebacks in concerts and broadcast varieties.

== Discography ==
- What You Know (點樣講你知 dim yeung kong nei tsi, 1980)
- Young Trio (青春三重奏 ching cheon san chung jau, 1981)
- IQ sing sook si (IQ成熟時, 1981)
- The Origin of Man (人之初 yan ji chor, 1982)
- Ken Choi's New and Greatest Songs (蔡楓華新曲精選 Choi Fung-Wah san kouk ching suen, 1983)
- Ken Choi (蔡楓華, 1983)
- Heat Wave (高溫境界 gou wan king gaai, 1984)
- Love Is Not a Game (愛不是遊戲 ngoi bat see yau hei, 1985)
- Absolute Emptiness (絕對空虛 joot deoi hung heoi, 1986)
- Broken (破碎 por seoi, 1986)
- In the Herd of Wind (風中追風 fung jung jeoi fung, 1987)
- Revolt and Other Selections (叛逆+精選 boon yik + ching suen, 1988)
- Kenneth Today (1989)

== Selected filmography ==
Films

- Eclipse (薄荷咖啡, 1982; also called 女強人的故事)
- The Odd One Dies (兩個只能活一個, 1997)

Television

- The Trio (青春三重奏, 1981), RTV, now called ATV
- Sweet Love Encore (愛情安哥 Encore, 1982), TVB
- The Pitfall (種計, 1985), TVB
