= Model Housing Estate =

Housing estate in North Point, Hong Kong

Coordinates: 22.29083°N 114.20868°E

- Chinese: 模範邨
- Cantonese Yale: Mòuh faahn chyūn
- Literal meaning: Model estate
Transcriptions
Yue: Cantonese
- Yale Romanization: Mòuh faahn chyūn
- Jyutping: Mou4 faan6 cyun1

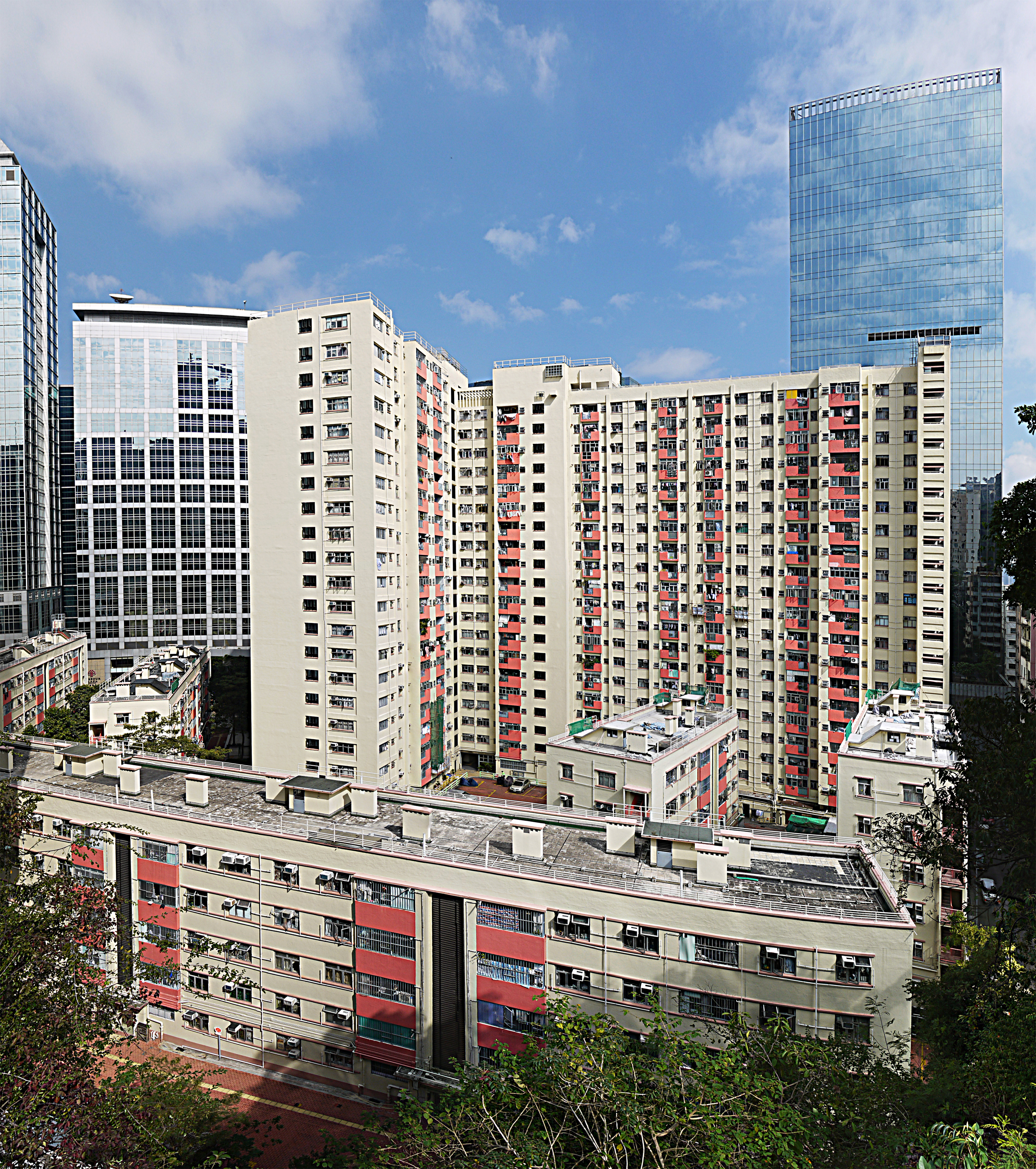
Model Housing Estate

Model Housing Estate is a public housing estate located at King's Road in Tsat Tsz Mui between Quarry Bay and North Point in Hong Kong, near MTR Quarry Bay station Exit C. It is the oldest existing public housing estate in Hong Kong. It comprises 7 residential blocks completed in 1952 to 1953, 1973 and 1979 respectively, offering a total of 667 flats.

== Background ==
Unlike other public housing estate, Model Housing Estate was developed by neither the Hong Kong Housing Authority nor the Hong Kong Housing Society. Instead, it was developed by a voluntary organization called "Hong Kong Model Housing Society" (Chinese: 香港模範屋宇會).

The estate was developed in two phases. Phase 1 includes Block A, B, C, D, E and F built between 1951 and 1953, Blocks A-E facing King's Road share the same design, and Block F stands at the back of Block A-E, close to the mountain. In Phase 2 (between 1973 and 1979), The whole of Block C, together with part of Blocks A and B (facing King's Road) was torn down and rebuilt into the current 20-stories, "T" shape new Block C (Block C1 on top of the old Block C, and Block C2 on top of what had been part of Blocks A and B.). When Block C was completed in 1979, the manager responsible for flat allocation suddenly went missing. The Hong Kong Housing Authority then took over the whole estate and allocated the flats to Block C tenants.

== Houses ==
Name	Type	Completion
Man Shun House (Block A)	Non-standard	1952
Man King House (Block B)	Non-standard	1952
Man Hong House (Block C1 and C2)	Old Slab	1973 (C1), 1979 (C2)
Man Ning House (Block D)	Non-standard	1953
Man Cheung House (Block E)	Non-standard	1953
Man Lok House (Block F)	Non-standard	1953

== Politics ==
Model Housing Estate is located in Healthy Village constituency of the Eastern District Council. It was formerly represented by James Pui Chi-lap, who was elected in the 2019 elections until July 2021.
