= Alan & Hacken =

Hong Kong music duo

- Chinese: 左麟右李
Transcriptions
Standard Mandarin
- Hanyu Pinyin: Zuǒlín Yòulǐ
Yue: Cantonese
- Yale Romanization: Jó Lèuhn Yauh Léih
- Jyutping: Zo2 Leon4 Jau6 Lei5

Alan & Hacken (Chinese: 左麟右李; Cantonese Yale: Jólèuhn Yauhléih) is a series of concert tours and studio albums by Cantopop stars Alan Tam and Hacken Lee produced between 2003 and 2014.

The name of the duo act, also known as "Neighbors" in English, is a play of words on the Chinese idiom 左鄰右里 using homophones 麟 and 李 in the artists' names. The concert became known for the "happy culture" which it inspired, especially welcomed in a period of economic downturn and an air of pessimism in Hong Kong society as a whole.

Tam and Lee first performed a duo act under the Alan & Hacken name in a concert tour in 2003 and 2004 which included over 100 shows in Hong Kong, Malaysia, Canada, and the United States. They released an eponymous studio album in late 2003 following positive acclaim for their double act. Tam and Lee held further series of concerts under the Joleuhn Yauhleih name in 2009.

In 2013-14 Alan & Hacken held a reunion tour to celebrate the 10th anniversary of their double act. The tour held 13 concerts in Hong Kong and further shows abroad.

The Alan & Hacken concerts and albums were produced by PolyGram, where both Alan Tam and Hacken Lee had been signed artists since the formation of the duo, and later Universal Music which acquired PolyGram. In 2016 Lee departed Universal Music to join Emperor Group, officially ending the Alan & Hacken franchise.
