= Sammy Leung =

Hong Kong singer and actor

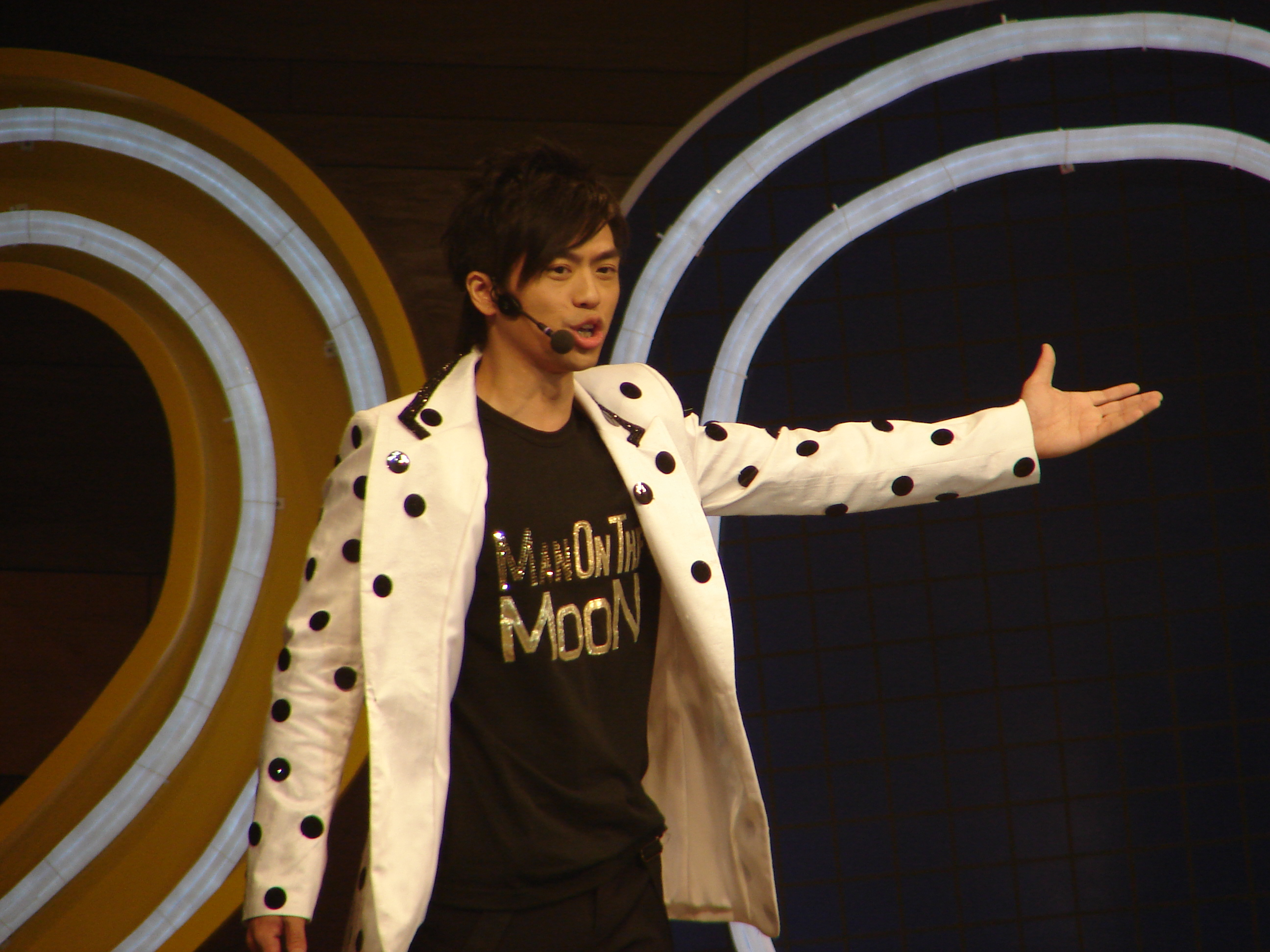
- Leung in 2007
- Born: Leung Chi-Kin (梁志健); British Hong Kong
- Occupations: DJ; MC; actor; singer; host
- Years active: 1994–present
- Awards: TVB Anniversary Awards – Best Presenter; 2006 15/16

Chinese name
- Chinese: 森美
Transcriptions
Standard Mandarin
- Hanyu Pinyin: sēnměi
- Bopomofo: ㄙㄣ ㄇㄟˇ
- IPA: [sə́nmèi]
Yue: Cantonese
- Yale Romanization: sāmméih
- Jyutping: sam1mei5
- IPA: [sɐ́mme̬i]

Sammy Leung Chi Kin is an actor under TVB, DJ, singer, and host for Commercial Radio Hong Kong.

== Life and career ==
Leung was raised in Kwai Shing Estate since from 4 to 15 years old, and received his secondary education at St. Stephen's College and La Salle College, graduating with a score of 25 (1A5B) in the HKCEE. He graduated from Chinese University of Hong Kong's School of Journalism and Communication. He was invited to be a lecturer at his alma mater, teaching radio production and media studies, until he left in 2006 to pursue his radio career further.

Leung tried out to become a DJ for Commercial Radio when he was studying at the New Asia College of the Chinese University of Hong Kong. Though also working part-time, he became a DJ, taking the name Kelvin at first. He then used his own English name and converted it to a Chinese translation as his DJ name, Sammy (Chinese: 森美; Cantonese Yale: sāmméih).

A few years into his DJ career, he was paired with Kitty Yuen (Also known as Yuen Siu Yi or Siu Yi), and they are still partners. One of Leung's other radio shows not hosted with Siu Yi is Sammy Moving, co-hosted by Leo Chim, Ah So, Marco, and later Seven Luk (Chan Keung).

Leung co-hosted the show Minutes to Fame (Season 3) with Miriam Yeung, and starred in a Hong Kong movie Breeze of July with Monie Tung in 2007, the Opening Film of the 2007 Hong Kong Asian Film Festival.

In 2008, he presented his own talk show, The Show Must Go Wrong, at the Hong Kong International Trade and Exhibition Centre's Star Hall. As of 2008 he was the primary spokesperson for the Vita Green product Vita Hair. In 2009, he partnered with Stephen Chan Chi-wan to host a multimedia show Ten Man Lane.

In 2010, Leung started co-hosting (with Kristal Tin) the second season of the singing competition The Voice on TVB.

In 2017, Leung publicly supported John Tsang's election campaign for chief executive.

He was one of the main characters starring in the TVB drama, Friendly Fire. 2012–2013

== 2006 Radio controversy ==
Leung was reprimanded in 2006 by Commercial Radio Hong Kong and the Hong Kong Government over an online poll created by his show, asking listeners to nominate "the female artist whom you want to sexually harass the most". The poll created an enormous furore, and as a result, CRHK was fined a hefty sum by the government and Leung was suspended from his radio show for two months, during which he could not take up any paid jobs but instead had to attend to classes on media ethics. His role as the host on TVB's 15/16 quiz show was also revoked.

== Filmography ==
- Meow (2017)
- Love off the Cuff (2017)
- My Ages Apart (2017)
- Little Big Master (2015)
- Friendly Fire (TV series) (2012)
- Love in Time (2012)
- Beauty on Duty (2010)
- 72 Tenants of Prosperity (2010)
- Love Connected (2009)
- True Women for Sale (2008)
- Nobody's Perfect (2008)
- Legendary Assassin (2008)
- Happy Funeral (2008)
- L for Love, L for Lies (2008)
- Breeze of July (2007)
- Simply Actors (2007)
- Dancing Lion (2007)
- Love Is Not All Around (2007)
- Super Fans (2007)
- Kung Fu Mahjong 3 (2007)
- Love Undercover 3 (2006)
- Dating a Vampire (2006)
- Don't Open Your Eyes (2006)
- My Kung Fu Sweetheart (2006)
- Kung Fu Mahjong 2 (2005)
- The Unusual Youth (2005)
- My Sweetie (2004)
- Super Model (2004)
- Sound of Colors (2003)
- Love Undercover 2: Love Mission (2003)
- My Lucky Star (2003)
- Truth or Dare: 6th Floor Rear Flat (2003)
- Honesty (2003)
- Love Undercover (2002)
- Fighting for Love (2001)
- Feel 100% II (2001)
- Dummy Mommy, Without a Baby (2001)
- United We Stand and Swim (2001)
- For Bad Boys Only (2000)
- When I Look Upon the Stars (1999)
- Gorgeous (1999)
- Task Force (1997)
- Feel 100% (1996)
- Best of the Best (1996)
