= North Point Camp =

Japanese World War II Prisoner-of-war camp in North Point, Hong Kong

- Internment camp
- Location within Hong Kong
- Coordinates: 22.2923°N 114.2031°E
- Location: North Point, Hong Kong
- Built by: Government of Hong Kong
- Operated by: Japan
- Original use: Refugee camp
- Operational: 1941
- Inmates: Prisoners of war

North Point Camp was a Japanese World War II prisoner-of-war camp in North Point, Hong Kong which primarily held Canadian and Royal Naval prisoners.

== History ==
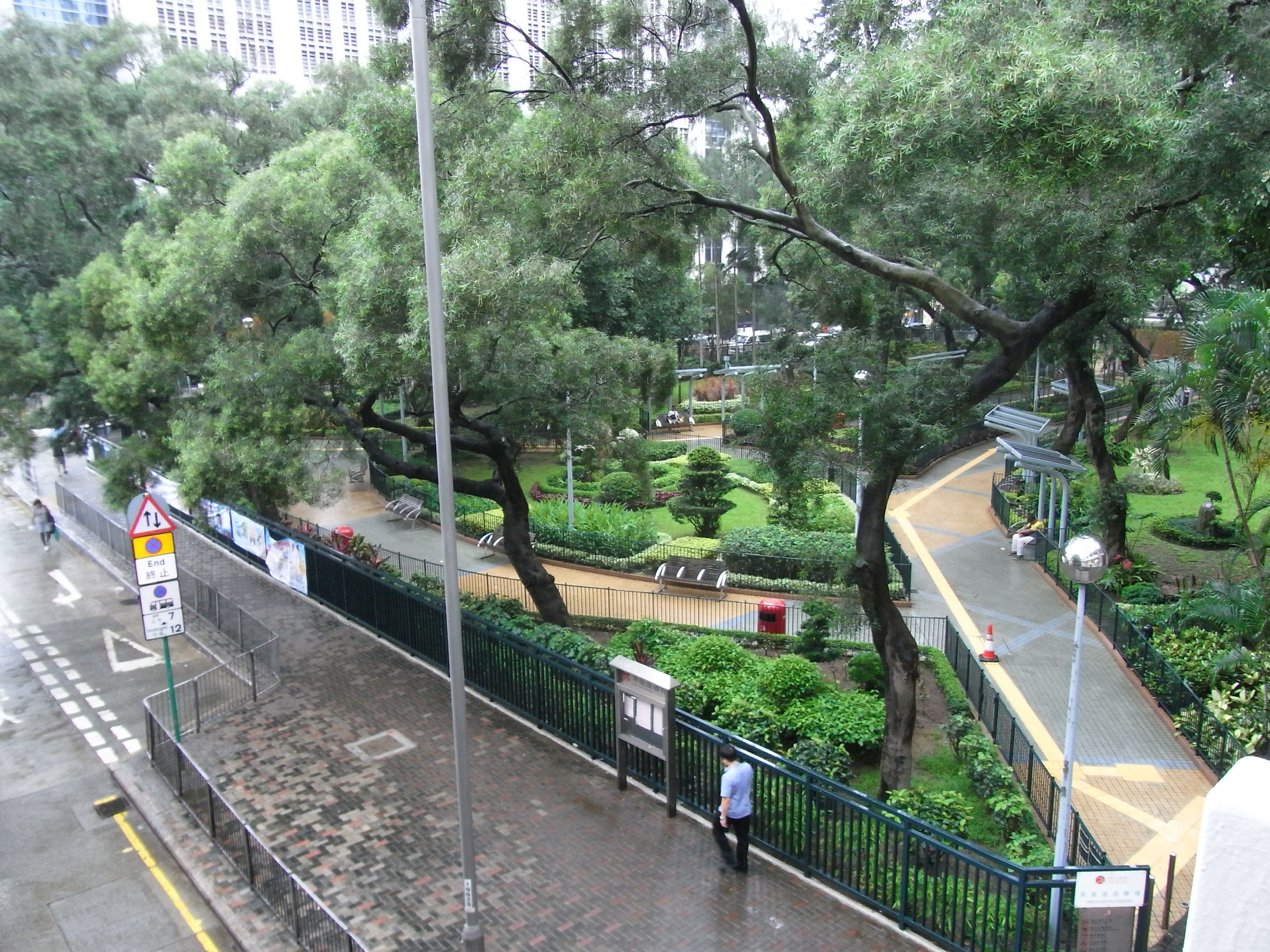
King's Road Playground in 2012. The park covers parts of the old camp site.

Built by the Hong Kong government as a refugee camp before the war, it was severely damaged during the Japanese invasion of Hong Kong Island on the night of 18 December 1941. It began life as a POW camp almost immediately after, as non-Chinese civilians from the area were interned there, as were the first men of West Brigade who were captured in the battles at the beachheads, Jardine's Lookout, and Wong Nai Chung Gap. After a few months, the Royal Naval prisoners were moved to Sham Shui Po POW Camp and North Point became purely Canadian. The Canadians themselves moved out to Sham Shui Po on 26 September 1942, at which point the camp was closed. Conditions at camp were overcrowded and unsanitary. The two main threats that the prisoners faced were disease and the lack of food, which proved fatal for many interned at the camp.

Today part of the old camp site is the King's Road Playground, but there are no memorials of any kind.

== See also ==
- Tin Chiu Street
- Japanese occupation of Hong Kong
- List of Japanese-run internment camps during World War II
- Second Sino-Japanese War
- Stanley Internment Camp
