= Hacken Lee =

- 李克勤
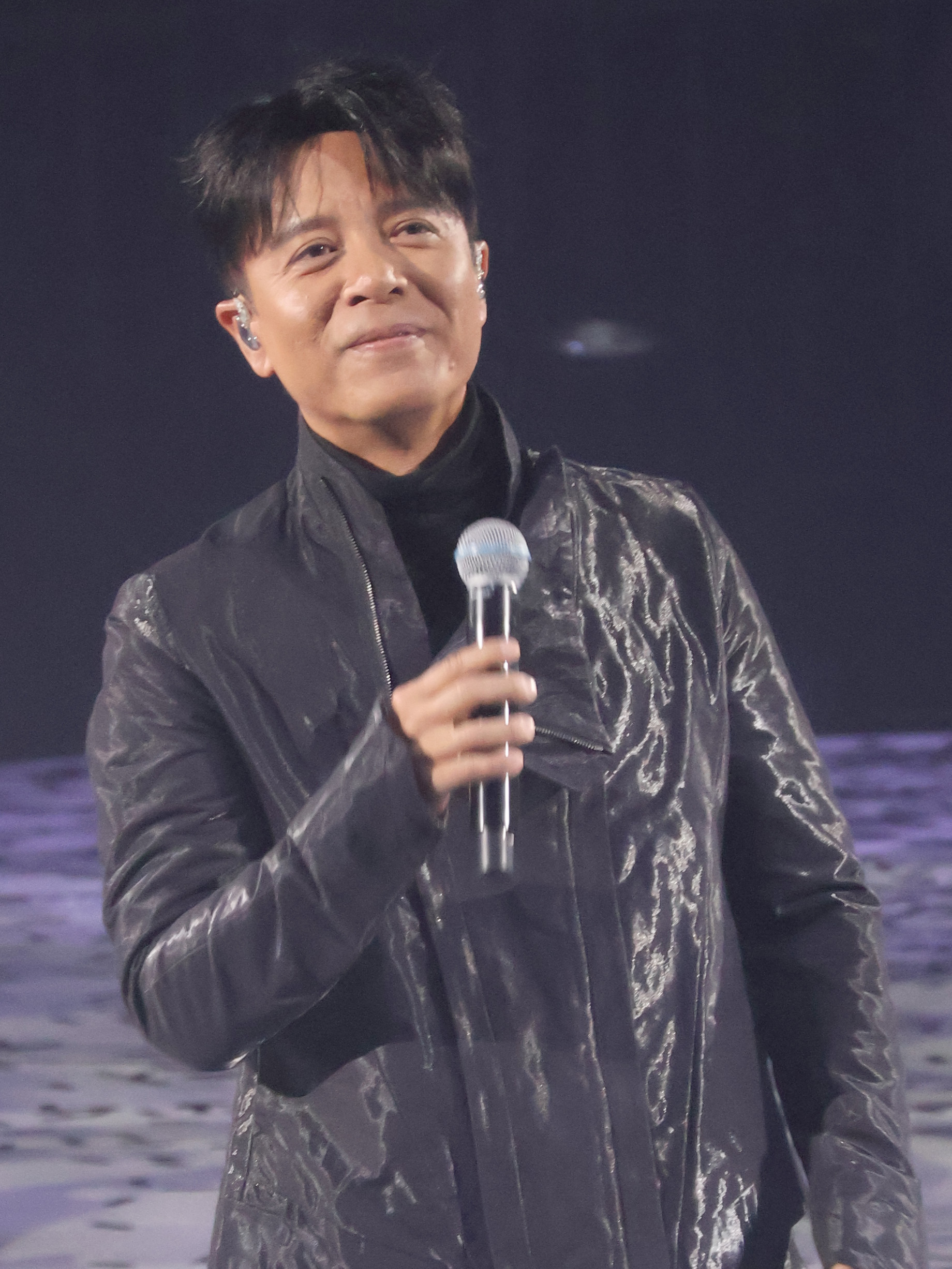
- Lee in 2025
- Born: 6 December 1967 (age 58); British Hong Kong (now Hong Kong, China)
- Other name: Stephen Lee
- Education: Secondary 7, Wah Yan College, Hong Kong
- Occupations: Singer; television host; lyricist; actor
- Years active: 1985–present
- Spouse: Emily Lo Suk-yi (m. 2006)
- Children: Ryan Lee (son); Rex Lee (son)
- Awards: New Talent Singing Awards – 1985 Semi-Finalist TVB Anniversary Awards – My Favourite Television Character; 2002 Legal Entanglement

Chinese name
- Traditional Chinese: 李克勤
Transcriptions
Standard Mandarin
- Hanyu Pinyin: Lǐ Kèqín
Yue: Cantonese
- Yale Romanization: Léih Hākkàhn
- Jyutping: Lei5 Hak1kan4
- IPA: [lej˩˧ hɐk̚˥kʰɐn˩]
- Musical career
- Origin: Hong Kong
- Genres: Cantopop; Mandopop
- Instrument: Vocals
- Labels: PolyGram Records (1986–92); Starlight Records (1993–95); Music Impact (1996–98); Universal (1999–2016); Emperor Group (2017–present)
- Website: hackenleenet.com

Hacken Lee (Chinese: 李克勤; Cantonese Yale: Lei5 Hak1kan4; pinyin: Lǐ Kèqín) is a Hong Kong singer, television host and actor, active since the 1980s. In 2013, Lee's song "House of Cards" swept multiple awards in many Hong Kong award ceremonies, including "World's Best Song" and "Broadcasting Index" in Metro's Awards. As of 2013, he has reached 14 times in receiving the "Outstanding Pop Singer Award" at RTHK's "Top Ten Chinese Gold Songs Awards" and has established an irreplaceable status in the music industry of Hong Kong and Asia.

== Life and career ==
=== Early years: 1980s ===
Lee was brought up in a middle-class family. He lived in Arts Mansion in Happy Valley during his teenage years. He studied in Pun U Association Primary School (1974–1980) and Wah Yan College, Hong Kong (1980–1987).

After his HKCEE in 1985, he entered the TVB new talent show along with Alex To, William So, Vivian Chow and Grasshopper, though he was unable to make it into the top 15 finalists. He then participated in the Second Hong Kong 19 District Singing Contest in 1985, a competition which he won with his rendition of Alan Tam's song "Love in the Fog" (霧之戀). He was subsequently offered a contract with PolyGram Records.

Lee however continued his studies at Wah Yan College while singing part-time. He turned full-time in the summer of 1987 after failing to gain a university place due to poor HKALE results.

His debut EP Hacken Lee EP sold less than 10,000 copies. Symbol of Destiny was released in 1987. His musical popularity lacking, he gained recognition by starring in TVB dramas in the late 1980s, especially the youth drama series "Teenage No More" (不再少年時), for which he also sang the theme song. In 1989, his song "Unchanged in Lifetime", the theme song of ATV's Cantonese version of the drama series "Blue Moon," won both the RTHK "Top Ten Chinese Gold Songs Awards" and "TVB Jade Solid Gold Awards."

=== 1990s ===
In 1990, Lee, Jacky Cheung and Andy Lau were dubbed as "Three Musketeers in the music industry" by the media and were hailed as "tomorrow's highly anticipated superstars". Later on that year, however, due to the contract disputes between Hacken and his company, Hacken's career faltered.

In 1992, Lee's career began to rise when he released the song "Red Sun" (紅日), for which he penned the Chinese lyrics that made it popular. In 1993, Hacken switched to Star Record Company and released the song "Look Back," which once again boosted his singing career and allowed him to win TVB Jade Solid Gold's Golden Award as well as reach the top five nominees for the Most Popular Singer Award. His first solo concert at Hong Kong Coliseum, later that year, sold out in just a few hours.

In 1994, Lee was crowned the title of "Zero Defect Vocals," alongside Jacky Cheung who was named "Perfect Vocals" the year before, and as well as the successor of the famous Alan Tam.

In 1995, after the unprecedented success of his first solo concert, Hacken held his second concert again at the Hong Kong Coliseum, "Dragon '95 Hacken's Contact of Hear Concert", for a span of 10 days. However, sales had declined around 40%, to which only grew worse after the concert, leading to contractual disputes between the record company.

In 1996, Lee was signed on to another company where he released the album "When I Found You" (當找到你), with which sales and popularity improved slightly. However, due to several personnel changes and contractual disputes since the release of his album "By Hacken Side" (在克勤身邊), his album eventually was postponed indefinitely.

In summer 1998, Lee was chaired as TVB for World Cup association football's sportscaster, and he composed and sang the song for the program, "Adventure of Football Fans", with the success of it leading to the release of a compilation album.

After the contract was expired with the record company, Lee's inability to find a recording company led him in several attempts in maintaining popularity by foraying beyond his singing career into acting in dramas and hosting TV programs.

In late 1999, Lee eventually signed onto Universal Music (former PolyGram) and issued his album "A Year Or So". In December, he had a musical performance with the Hong Kong Repertory, named "Adventure".

=== 2000s ===
With his signing to Universal Music, Lee released several hits with "Feet of Fortune" (前後腳) and "Flying Flowers" 飛花" in 2001, and "The Grasp of Love" (愛不釋手) and "Tall Girl" (高妹) in 2002.

In late 2001, Lee performed in collaboration with the Hong Kong Philharmonic Orchestra, "Hong Kong Philharmonic & Hacken Live", organized total in 4 concerts and 2 additional concerts. The concert series was very well-received, as was a recording released CD and VCD of the series, both CD and VCD got "Ten Best Selling Album Award" at IFPI. In July, he launched the album "Flying Flower (飛花)", with the song in same title, he won TVB Jade Solid Gold Awards's Golden Melody Award, "Metro Music Awards" Metro Best Song Award, and RTHK "Top Ten Chinese Gold Songs Award" Outstanding Pop Singer Award.

In early 2002, Lee held his solo concert "Hacken Lee Live in Concert 2002" and got the praised again, and its recordings were equally well received at IFPI. In addition, he sang for TVB World Cup program's theme song "Victory"; the song "Tall Girl" was composed by Gigi Leung, with lyrics written by himself, and later on ""The Grasp of Love (愛不釋手)". At the Jade Solid Gold Awards 2002, he won the "Most Popular Male Singer Award" for the first time, and he had been re-confirmed as the successor of Alan Tam. Around the time of the 2002 concert, he co-starred in the TVB drama "Legal Entanglement (法網伊人)" which was aired. The series achieved high ratings and was one of TVB's most popular dramas that year. He won the "Most Favourite Character" award at the "2002 TVB Anniversary Awards" for his role in the series. Additionally, he was appointed the host of the 2002 World Cup and sang the theme song of TVB, which dominated the local charts for some time. He also won his first Most Popular Male Singer in TVB Jade Solid Gold Award.

In 2003, 2004 and 2009, Lee partnered with Alan Tam in a series of concert tours around the world, including multiple shows in Hong Kong and Las Vegas. Known in English as "Alan & Hacken", the show's Chinese title, "左麟右李", is a play on the Chinese four-character idiom "左鄰右里" which means "neighbor", by using the artists' names homonyms 麟 and 李. By the end of 2003, Hacken won the Most Popular Male Singer in TVB Jade Solid Gold Award" for the second time.

In November 2004, Lee partnered with Joey Yung in a collaboration of a concert, which is better known by another four-character idiom "刻不容緩 (Urgency cannot afford delay)", a play on their names with the homonyms 克 and 容, releasing a single with the same name. He was called one of the "New 4 Heavenly King" by Alan Tam. In the end of 2004, Hacken swept the awards in music award ceremonies again, including Top Ten Chinese Gold Song by RTHK's "Best Pop Male Artist Award", his live album "Alan & Hacken 2004 Concert" got "10 Guangdong Album Sales Award" by IFPI, and he won the "Best Sales Local Singer" again.

In 2005, Lee released his fourth Mandarin album Ask About Love, and he started a series of promotion activities in mainland China. By the end of 2005, He was the first Chinese artist to release a DualDisc, entitled "Hacken Lee Concert Hall". For this album, Universal Music invested over a million dollars, invited 4 Chinese musicians to perform the songs of album, moreover, they gave up the general recording mode, moved to the music hall for recording, the CD side using a coherent approach to record the live recordings of the songs in surround sound, and the DVD side featured the making of footage. The album was out of stock twice in a week after it launched and sales broke through a platinum figure very soon. In December, he won the "Most Popular Male Singer" of TVB Jade Solid Gold Award again, his third such win. He then won "My Favorite Singer" award and 5 song awards at "Metro Music Awards". On 1 January 2006, he won the bronze prize of the "My Favorite Singer".

From 28 January 2006 to 5 February, Lee held a series of sell-out concerts at Hong Kong Coliseum, named "Hacken Lee Live In Concert 2006", which was sponsored by Carlsberg) during the Chinese New Year period, and it was the first high-definition video in Cantonese concert. Meanwhile, he hosted the World Cup program for TVB, his third time being a football sportscaster, and wrote the lyrics and sung for the theme song, "I'm Number 10". In mid 2006, Hacken traveled to Seoul for recording the live songs of next album, "Hacken Lee Seoul Concert Hall II". All songs were recorded at the Harmony Theatre, Koyang Culture City Hall, Korea from 28 to 31 August 2006 for live taking. Many local Korean musicians participated in the recording project, including Kwak Jung "Harpist K" on harp, So Kyoung-jin on Korean big drum, Jang Hyo-Seok on saxophone, Kim Won-jin as boy soprano, Kim Hyun-Mi and Jung Hyun-suk performed "Joy of Strings" on violin, Kim Hae-ryeon on viola, and Chung Yu-young on cello, David Hodges from New York played an antique 1920 bandoneon while recording. The album was released on a CD with an accompanying DVD using high-definition 1080i format, dated in November 2006, and following the success of the original Concert Hall, became the favorite of hi-fi enthusiasts, selling over 80,000 copies.

In 2007, Lee launched the selection album "Hacken Lee No. 1 Hits", it was released on 22 November 2007, which contains 4 CDs of his classic hits and new songs. He participated in the concert held by the Hong Kong Government, to celebrate the tenth anniversary of the establishment of the HKSAR organization. At climax of the concert he sang the song "Legend Of The Dragon" and "Red Sun" with 20 professional drummers and over 10,000 primary students from Hong Kong, Macau and Taiwan. This performance was included in the Guinness World Records. In between, his environmental-themed song was named "Whispering Whose"（花落誰家), which won the "Song of The Year" on Jade Solid Gold award. He also announced that his wife had given birth to his first son, Ryan Lee at Hong Kong Sanatorium and Hospital.

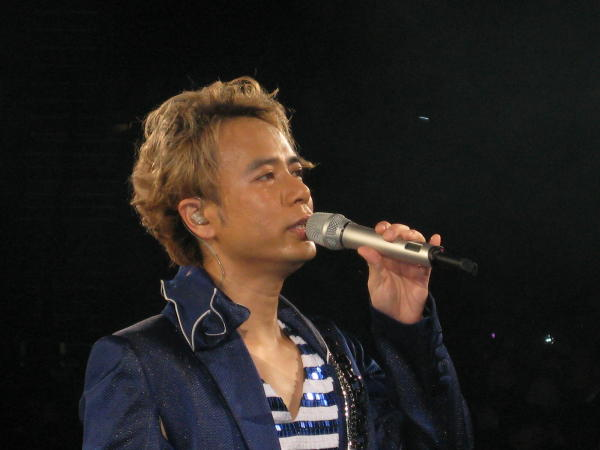
Lee live in concert, 2008

Lee hosted a 2008 Chinese New Year concert series, which sold out 11 shows in Hong Kong from 8 to 18 February 2008; because it overlapped Valentine's Day, he featured the new song "Every Day is a Valentine's Day" and followed with a world tour. After, he was begun to prepare his new canton album by inviting some singer-songwriters to participate in the creation, such as Mavis Fan, Eason Chan, Khalil Fong, Hins Cheung, Louis Cheung, Justin Lo, Vincent Chow and Jan Lamb. In order to maximize the quality, the album took 9 months to produce. He sent only two new songs to radio that year, "She merciful and I'm Sad" and "What Year Is Now". Those songs received radio's favor. He was also lyricist for himself of the theme song of "Alan Tam & Hacken Lee Concert 2009", and the song "Needless To Be Scared", and lyricist of the song composed by Eason Chan, named "Season Changed". In late 2009, Lee released the album "Threesome" with the hit songs "Lonely Henchman" (寂寞嘍囉) and "Twenty-Four Cities" (二十四城記).

Lee was a host for the Beijing Olympics broadcast in 2008, as well as the ambassador of Standard Chartered Marathon and ambassador of the East Asian Games 2009.

=== 2010 to present ===
After the birth of his son, Lee also announced he would continue his concert tours and recording for his new Cantonese album in May 2010. In middle of June, his new song "Sinner" was sent to radio. On 31 July, the song was adapted from the Mandarin-language song "Bad Guy" of Abin Fong. It won awards from three radio stations, including RTHK, CRHK, and Metro. On 4 August, he held a Moov Live mini concert, performed the 7 songs of his upcoming new album. On 15 September, his new album Sinner was officially launched. Because of HKRIA Copyright Controversy, Hacken was prohibited to appear on TVB, Lawrence Cheng of Now TV, successfully arranged an interview with him, which was included in episode 79, broadcast on 2 October 2010. In 2011, Lee was awarded again at RTHK "Top Ten Chinese Gold Songs Awards", making him the first singer to receive song awards through four decades (1980s to 2010s). Then, he held the concert with the Hong Kong Sinfonietta, in total of 6 days, named "Hacken & Hong Kong Sinfonietta Concert Hall 2011" in summer vacation. This was Hacken collaboration with Yip Wing-sie again, since "Hong Kong Philharmonic & Hacken Live" at 2001. After the concert, he released a new Mandarin single with his Cantonese album called "Deja Vu". The second plug song in cantonese was "Sky Lanterns", was boarded championship of the three radio stations on 29 October, got the "Three championship" again. At 10 December, Hacken appeared and sang for "Tung Wah Charity Show" on TVB, he was the first artist of HKRIA who can participate in TVB show after ice-breaking of HKRIA Copyright Controversy since 2010.

By January 2012, Lee won the 7th out of 10 of the song award at the "Ultimate Song Chart Awards", for the song "Milky Way". He was invited to attend the Jade Solid Gold Awards Ceremony, as a performer and guests of honor. Then, he went to Beijing for the promotion of his new Mandarin album, "'Deja Vu", and create something for his new canton album with two producer, Schumann and Alex Fung, which was his first cooperation with Schumann. At early of March, he was invited to sing the Hong Kong version of the theme song, "Armageddon Prairie", for the UEFA Champions League broadcast by Now TV, and he was chair as the host and the commentator of Now TV. In late August, he released the concept of adult rhymes of the new album, Amongst The Forest. Since he got a great acclaim from collaborating with the Hong Kong Sinfonietta, he held his first solo concert tour in mainland China in September. In November, he hosted "Minute to Win It", a game show authorized by NBC and production by TVB, and again hosted the TVB game show "Minutes to Fame" in 2005. The first episode of the show received a 30 points rating.

In January 2013, Lee attended for "Top Ten Chinese Gold Songs Awards" held by RTHK and won the award for the song "What's The Things Alive For".

In May 2013, Lee's new song "Forward", was invited the Hong Kong Children's Choir for vocal accompaniment, which was rare inspirational song in recent years at local music scene, and also the rare allegro song of him in recent years, and was sent to the radio. "Hacken Lee Concert Hall" series was separated by 7 years, Hacken launched a brand new HiFi album again at July, named "Remakes By Hacken". The album was fully produced by Schumann and Alex Fung again. After the album was released, it got the favor by the community of professional musicians, and praised by the fans. It occupied iTunes Top Songs list in the first week of release, even reached the success of double platinum album of sales.

In October 2013, he released the new canton EP, named "House of Cards", the song in same title became the Annual Golden Song, on major radio awards ceremony were impressive results. In December, Hacken held concerts with Alan Tam, to commemorate the 10th anniversary as being "Neighbour" (左麟右李), and they went on a world tour after.

By May 2014, Lee issued a song "No Friend", which created by Eric Kwok and Wyman Wong, the song was sent to the radio. The song was got widely radio and fans acclaim followed by "House of Cards". In June, he was the World Cup commentator for TVB, and launched his selection album "Selection To No Friends."

In 2015, Lee directly advanced to the semi-final of King of Mask Singer (蒙面歌王) having become the first Masked Singer to win the preliminaries and reveal his face and identity.

In 2016, Lee participated in the singing competition I Am a Singer (season 4) as the host and starting competitor and began the competition with his rendition of Alan Tam's song "Love in the Fog" (霧之戀), the song that brought him into the music industry via the singing competition he participated in 30 years ago. His consistently great weekly performances won over the hearts of many of the audience, with some of his most notable performances being his rendition of Ekin Cheng's "Days of Friendship" (友情歲月), C AllStar's "Sky Ladder" (天梯), and his 4th knockout round (ultimate knockout round) performance with renown pianist Lang Lang "I Can't Sing" (我不會唱歌), and he made it to compete in the finale (week 13) of the competition. Joey Yung sung with him in the Season 4 Biennial concert, shortly before Lee moved away from Universal Music, ending his partnership with Alan Tam, but reuniting him with Joey Yung, after they had a concert in 2015.

In 2017, Lee released his 30th anniversary album titled "30克" which featured the hit songs "C3PO" and "Lost Soul" (失魂記). He later hosted his 30th anniversary concert series in September of 2017 in Hong Kong. The concert featured 9 shows across 9 days.

== Personal life ==
On November 28, 2006, Lee married his long-time girlfriend, Emily Lo Suk Yi, the winner of the 1992 Miss Hong Kong Pageant. On October 22, 2007, Lo gave birth to their first child, Ryan Lee Lap-yan. Their younger son Rex Lee Lik-sze was born on March 26, 2010.

== Music ==
=== Discography ===
Year	Record company	Type	Title
1986	PolyGram Records	EP	Hacken Lee EP
1987	PolyGram Records	Album	Signs of Life
1988	PolyGram Records	Album	The Summer Tale
1989	PolyGram Records	Album	This Place & This Feeling
1989	PolyGram Records	EP	Hacken Lee Remix
1989	PolyGram Records	EP	Purple Dream
1990	PolyGram Records	Album	One Thousand And One Night
1990	PolyGram Records	New + Best Selections	Love
1991	PolyGram Records	EP	The Break of Dawn
1991	PolyGram Records	EP	Street Theater In Rain
1992	PolyGram Records	Album	Blazing Sun
1992	PolyGram Records	Album	Wish You Could Understand
1993	PolyGram Records	New + Best Selections	Red Sun Selections
1993	PolyGram Records	Selections	Selection CD Box Set
Apr 1993	Star Records	Album	Thinking You In Life
1993	Star Records	Album	Album
1994	PolyGram Records	Selections	Red Sun Selections 24K Gold
1994	PolyGram Records	Selections	Selection 24K Gold
1994	Star Records	Mandarin Album	Life Expectation
1994	Star Records	Album	Goodbye ('93 Commemorative Edition)
1994	PolyGram Records	Album	Wish
1994	PolyGram Records	Album	That's The Lovesong
1995	Star Records	Album	Polygram 88 Collection - Hacken Lee
1995	Star Records	Album	Hackenation
1995	Star Records	Mandarin Album	Make Nothing of Gentle
Dec, 1995	PolyGram Records	Selections	Reborn
1996	PolyGram Records	Selections	Polygram 88 Collection - Hacken Lee Vol.2
1996	Star Records	New + Best Selections	Third Dimension
1996	Music Impact Ltd.	Album	Searching For The Best
1996	Music Impact Ltd.	Album	When I Find You
1997	Music Impact Ltd.	Album	Searching For The Best 17
1997	Music Impact Ltd.	Album	Please Go To Sleep Early and Wake Up Early
1997	Music Impact Ltd.	Album	Hacken's 17 Love Songs
1997	Music Impact Ltd.	Album	By Hacken's Side
1997	Music Impact Ltd.	Mandarin Album	Love Prison
1998	Music Impact Ltd.	New + Best Selections	New + Best Selections '98
1999	Music Impact Ltd.	Selections	Hacken Lee Wonderful Music 48 Best Collection
1999	Music Impact Ltd.	Best Selections	The Most of Hacken Lee Collection
1999	Music Impact Ltd.	Best Selections	Hacken Lee Best Collection
2000	Universal Music	Album	One Year Half Year (New Version)
2000	Universal Music	Album	Lost To You Once Again
2001	Universal Music	Album	Precious Moment
2002	Universal Music	New + Best Selections	Hacken Lee Big Music Band
2002	Universal Music	Album	Let's Celebrate
2002	Universal Music	Album	Let's Celebrate (New Version)
2003	Universal Music	Album	Ever Last
2003	Universal Music	Album	Ever Last (New Version)
2003	Universal Music	New + Best Selections	Custom Made
2003	Universal Music	Album	Alan & Hacken
2004	Universal Music	Album	Smart I.D.
2004	Universal Music	Album	My Daring Trapezist
2005	Universal Music	Album	Hacken Lee Concert Hall
2005	Universal Music	Mandarin Album	Love is Irrational
2006	Universal Music	Album	The Unbeatable 10
2006	Universal Music	Album	Hacken Lee Seoul Concert Hall II
2007	Universal Music	Album	My Cup of Tea
2007	Universal Music	Selections Album	No.1 Hits
2007	Universal Music	雜錦大碟	Love07
2009	Universal Music	Album	Today Special
2009	Universal Music	Album	Threesome
2010	Universal Music	Album	Sinner
2011	Universal Music	Mandarin Album	Something Familiar
2012	Universal Music	Album	Amongst The Forest
2013	Universal Music	Album	Remakes By Hacken
2013	Universal Music	Album	House of Cards
2014	Universal Music	New + Best Selections	Hacken Lee Friendless Collection

=== Charts ===
Chart results
Album	Song	903	RTHK	997	TVB	Note
1986
Hacken Lee EP (李克勤 EP)	Watch (手錶)		-		-	
Hacken Lee EP (李克勤 EP)	Who Wants to Break Up? (誰願分手)		-		-	
1987
Signs of Life (命運符號)	Signs of Life (命運符號)		-		-	
1988
The Summer Tale (夏日之神話)	Still the Usual Place (仍是老地方)	15	/		8	
The Summer Tale (夏日之神話)	The Summer Tale (夏日之神話)	3	1		1	Original version: "I Love You kara hajimeyou (I Love You からはじめよう)" by Anzen Chitai.
The Summer Tale (夏日之神話)	Concert Hall (大會堂演奏廳)	12	/		6	
The Summer Tale (夏日之神話)	Ceasefire (停火)	/	/		-	
1989
This Place, This Feeling (此情此境)	Deepest Sadness (深深深)	4	1		1	
This Place, This Feeling (此情此境)	Blue Moon (藍月亮)	3	1		3	Original: "Tsuki ni nure ta futari (月に濡れたふたり)" by Anzen Chitai.
This Place, This Feeling (此情此境)	This Place & This Feeling (此情此境)	/	/		5	
Purple Dream	Eternal Love (一生不變)	2	1		1	
Purple Dream	Violins in the Old Days (舊日的小提琴)	29	-		-	
Purple Dream	Windy Nights (風雨夜歸人)	/	/		/	Original: "One Young Man (一人の青年)" by Masanori Ikeda (Masanori Ikeda)
Purple Dream	The Crescent Moon (月半小夜曲)	/	-		-	Original: "Halfmoon Serenade (ハーフムーン・セレナーデ)" by Kawai Naoko (Naoko Kawai)
1990
One Thousand And One Night (一千零一夜)	Love Sick (眷戀)	3	1		2	
One Thousand And One Night (一千零一夜)	One Thousand And One Night (一千零一夜)	2	1		1	Original: "Juliet" by Anzen Chitai
Love	Remember Her (懷念她)	/	-		7	
Love	My Shirley	/	1		1	
1991
The Break of Dawn (破曉時份)	Till We Meet Again (後會有期)	10	7		5	Original: "Lagu Cinta" by Alleycats
The Break of Dawn (破曉時份)	The Break of Dawn (破曉時份)	2	1		1	
The Break of Dawn (破曉時份)	Dream of the Red Chamber (紅樓夢)	/	-		-	Original: "Green Plum" (青梅竹馬) by Steve Chou (周治平)
The Break of Dawn (破曉時份)	Dancing Shoes (跳舞波鞋)	/	/		/	Original: "Seaside Go Go" by Anzen Chitai
Rain During a Street Play (雨中街頭劇)	Your Shining Knight (護花使者)	7	13		2	Original: "The Bright Red Sun Is Burning (真っ赤な夕陽が燃えている)" by Sement Mixers (セメントミキサーズ), itself a rearrangement of "Ubangi Stomp" by Charles Underwood
Rain During a Street Play (雨中街頭劇)	Missing You in Lifetime (一生掛念你)	(1)	1		1	Original: "One More Try" by Timmy T.
Rain During a Street Play (雨中街頭劇)	Rain During a Street Play (雨中街頭劇)	10	-		/	
Rain During a Street Play (雨中街頭劇)	Farewell To Campus (告別校園時)	/	-		/	
1992
Wish You Could Understand (只想您會意)	Wish You Could Understand (只想您會意)	/	13		2	The treble part sung by Shirley Kwan on behalf. Original: "Admit a Mistake" (認錯) by the band Ukelele (優客李林).
Wish You Could Understand (只想您會意)	My Melody	/	6		4	
Wish You Could Understand (只想您會意)	Amidst Lonely Days (寂寞煙雨天)	/	4		-	Original: "Neoleul Salanghagodo" (너를 사랑하고도) by Jeon You Na (전유나)
Red Sun (紅日)	Gau Foon Yu Mung (舊歡如夢)	/	-		4	Original singer was Tam Bing Man (Tam Ping-man)
Red Sun (紅日)	Blazing Sun (紅日)	2	1		2	Theme song of TVB drama serial Angel's Call (他來自天堂). Original: sore ga daiji (それが大事) by Daiji Man Brothers Band (大事MANブラザーズバンド)
Red Sun (紅日)	You Are My Sunshine (妳是我的太陽)	9	16		/	Interlude of TVB drama Angel's Call. Original: "Masterpiece" by Atlantic Starr
1993
Thinking You in Life (一生想您)	Look Back (回首)	2	1		1	
Thinking You in Life (一生想您)	Thinking You in Life (一生想您)	/	2		2	
Thinking You in Life (一生想您)	Waiting Your Willing to Marry Me (等妳願意Marry Me)	/	13		/	
Album	Not Love Another in Life (一生不愛別人)	4	4		5	
Album	Treat You Right Only (只懂得對妳好)	(1)	1		2	
Goodbye: 1993 Commemorative Edition (克勤再見93紀念版)	Goodbye (再見)	/	-	/	9	
1994
Goodbye: 1993 Commemorative Edition	Lonely Night (寂寞夜晚)	/	-	/	4	
Wish (希望)	Wish (希望)	/	1	/	1	
Wish (希望)	Cinderella (灰姑娘)	/	3	/	4	
What Do You Want in Life? (一生何求)	What Do You Want in Life? (一生何求)	/	7	/	/	
Precisely a Love Song (就是情歌)	To Regret (後悔)	/	12	/	8	Original: "What's Thing Left to You" (留什么给你) by Sun Nan (孙楠). Another Cantonese version was "Bitter Love" (苦戀), sung by Sammi Cheng.
Precisely a Love Song (就是情歌)	Jealous (妒忌)	/	4	/	6	
1995
Precisely a Love Song	Sneaky (偷偷摸摸)	/	1	1	1	
Brilliant Stars Vol.2 (星光燦爛Vol.2)	True Face (真面目)	/	19	/	/	
Reborn	Reluctant (依依不捨)	4	1	1	1	
Reborn	Cried for You (為你流淚)	/	1	1	1	
Reborn	I Need You (我需要你)	6	5	/	3	
Reborn	One Day (一日)	/	14	/	/	
Hackenation	Willingly and Gladly (心甘情願)	/	1	/	1	
1996
Hackenation	Affectionate Threads (情意萬縷)	/	12	/	/	Chorus with Joyce Lee (李樂詩)
When I Find You (當找到你)	When I Find You (當找到你)	1	1	1	1	Four Stations Combined Best Song Championship
When I Find You (當找到你)	How to Win the World Without You (沒有你，贏了世界又如何)	/	4	/	5	
When I Find You (當找到你)	Flying Alone (一個人飛)	/	19	/	7	
Searching for the Best (尋最)	Please Keep Early Hours (請你早睡早起)	B	1	1	1	
Searching for the Best (尋最)	Searching for the Best (尋最)	/	8	/	/	
1997
Searching for the Best	Smattering (一知半解)	/	/	/	/	
By Hacken's Side (在克勤身邊)	By My Side (在我身邊)	/	6	/	5	
By Hacken's Side (在克勤身邊)	Vegetable Soup (菜湯)	18	-	/	/	
By Hacken's Side (在克勤身邊)	Two Men Advance and Retreat (進退兩男)	18	2	/	2	
1998
'98 New Songs and Selections (李克勤'98新曲+精選)	Adverture of Football Fans (球迷奇遇記)	-	8	3	3	
1999
	A Deal (一言為定)	-	-	4	-	Chorus with Andy Hui, Gigi Leung and Winnie Young (楊婉儀)
About a Year (一年半載)	Cherry Blossom (櫻花)	18	1	3	1	
About a Year (一年半載)	Stay a Minute Longer (留多一分鐘)	18	12	17	4	
2000
Lost To You Once Again (再一次想你)	Lost To You Once Again (再一次想你)	-	1	10	1	Theme song of TVB drama "Street Fighters".
Lost To You Once Again	Fine, Madam! (小姐妳好嘢)	-	6	3	5	Chorus with Yip Sai Wing and Paul Wong.
2001
Hong Kong Philharmonic Orchestra & Hacken Lee Live (港樂‧克勤 Live)	Moonlight Rose (月光玫瑰)	13	-	-	8	
Precious Moment (飛花)	Precious Moment (飛花)	13	1	3	1	
Precious Moment	Feet of Fortune (前後腳)	-	1	10	1	
Hacken Lee Big Music Band (李克勤大樂隊)	Blood Boiling (血脈沸騰)	-	3	1	3	
2002
Hacken Lee Big Music Band (李克勤大樂隊)	To Take a Rain Check (來到今天)	-	18	7	6	Chorus by Emme Wong.
Flying Flower (飛花)	Loving You Unconsciously (不知不覺愛上你)	-	-	14	-	Theme song of TVB drama "Legal Entanglement".
Let's Celebrate	Victory	20	1	1	1	Originally by Bond (band)
Let's Celebrate	The Tall Girl (高妹)	10	1	1	1	Another version chorus by Gigi Leung, The Tall Girl (True Story version).
Let's Celebrate	Confidence Guarantee (信心保証)	-	17	3	-	
Treasure Your Friendship (愛不釋手)	Treasure Your Friendship (愛不釋手)	8	1	(1)	3	
2003
Different Songs Of Alan Tam (不一樣的譚詠麟 - 首部曲)	Neighbours (左鄰右里)	11	1	1	1	Chorus by Alan Tam.
Ever Last	Road To Wed Knot (合久必婚?)	8	1	1	1	Another version chorus by Jolie Chan.
Ever Last	When You Are in Love (愛一個人)	1	1	1	1	Chorus by Kelly Chen. Four Stations Combined Best Song Championship
Ever Last	Three Thousands And One Nights (三千零一夜)	3	3	1	8	
Custom Made	I Am Not Your Man (我不會唱歌)	1	1	1	1	Four Stations Combined Best Song Championship
Alan & Hacken (左麟右李)	Reap What You Sow (自作自受)	19	-	-	-	
Alan & Hacken	Rush Rush (嗱嗱聲)	2	1	1	1	Chorus by Alan Tam.
Custom Made	Warm Winter And Cool Summer (冬暖夏涼)	-	-	2	3	
2004
Alan & Hacken (左麟右李)	Admirers (仰慕者)	16	1	2	-	Chorus by Alan Tam.
Alan & Hacken 2004 (左麟右李04開心演唱會)	Lovelorn (失戀)	-	-	9	-	Chorus by Alan Tam and Joey Leung.
Smart ID	6 Feet Wonder (六呎風雲)	3	1	1	1	
Smart ID	Location of Kissing Goodbye (吻別的位置)	1	1	1	1	Four Stations Combined Best Song Championship
Smart ID	Bang The Door (嘭門)	11	-	-	6	
My Daring Trapezist (空中飛人)	My Daring Trapezist (空中飛人)	(1)	1	1	1	Four Stations Combined Best Song Championship
2005
My Daring Trapezist (空中飛人)	Festival (佳節)	7	1	1	1	
My Daring Trapezist	Urgency Cannot Afford Delay (刻不容緩)	16	14	-	5	Chorus with Joey Yung.
My Daring Trapezist	The Big Era (大時代)	1	7	1	-	
Love is Irrational (愛可以問誰)	The Way of Heal (醫道)	-	-	-	2	
Love is Irrational	Love is Irrational (愛可以問誰)	-	3	1	1	
Hacken Lee Concert Hall (李克勤演奏廳)	Lost In Seoul (情非首爾)	1	1	1	1	Four Stations Combined Best Song Championship
Hacken Lee Concert Hall	The Woman Before Marriage (婚前的女人)	1	1	1	1	Four Stations Combined Best Song Championship
2006
Hacken Lee Concert Hall (李克勤演奏廳)	Sentimentalist (勝情中人)	11	1	1	-	
Hacken Lee Concert Hall	Ten Years Before And After (十年前後)	16	16	3	-	
The Unbeatable 10 (我著十號)	The Unbeatable 10 (我著十號)	15	1	1	1	
	Family (一家人)	-	15	-	-	Chorus with Joey Yung.
Hacken Lee Seoul Concert Hall II (李克勤演奏廳II)	City of Sorrow (天水、圍城)	1	1	1	1	Four Stations Combined Best Song Championship
Hacken Lee Seoul Concert Hall II	Princess & Prince (公主太子)	1	1	1	1	Four Stations Combined Best Song Championship
2007
	Song of Gold (流金頌)	-	2	-	-	Chorus by George Lam, Andy Lau, Eason Chan and Leo Ku.
Hacken Lee Seoul Concert Hall II (李克勤演奏廳II)	Paris Hilton	-	4	-	-	
Hacken Lee Seoul Concert Hall II	Fraternal As Brothers (一場兄弟)	-	-	-	-	
My Cup of Tea	A Lifeless Home (花落誰家)	1	1	(1)	3	
My Cup of Tea	The Drive of Life (歲月風雲)	-	-	-	-	Theme song of TVB drama "The Drive of Life". Chorus by Chou Chuan-huing.
My Cup of Tea	Brazil Ladies Team (巴西女子隊)	-	-	-	-	
My Cup of Tea	First Wedding Anniversary (紙婚)	1	1	9	1	
Hacken Lee No.1 Hits	Goodbye Concert Hall (再見演奏廳)	1	1	1	2	
2008
	This Time, This Song (此時此歌)	-	1	-	-	Chorus by Samuel Hui, Andy Lau, Leo Ku, Eason Chan and Joey Yung.
Hacken Lee No.1 Hits	Nowhere To Love (相愛無門)	2	-	-	-	
Hacken's Concert Hall Live	Everyday Is Valentine's Day (天天都是情人節)	2	1	1	1	
Today Special	Humble & Kindness (她慈我悲)	17	1	1	1	
Today Special	What Year Is Now (今夕是何年)	1	3	1	-	
2009
Today Special	Don't Be Frightened (唔使驚)	2	1	2	-	Chorus by Alan Tam.
Today Special	Lonely For Million Years (萬年孤寂)	2	3	2	5	
Today Special	Ink Splashes (潑墨)	12	6	1	-	
Today Special	Daddy Daddy (爸爸聲)	-	9	2	-	Chorus by Louis Cheung.
Threesome	Grandma (嫲嫲)	8	1	1	1	
Uni-Power	Everyone is Hero (人人英雄)	4	-	-	-	Chorus by Various Artists of Universal Music Group.
Threesome	Lonely Fellow (寂寞嘍囉)	1	1	2	×	
2010
Threesome	Records of City 24 (二十四城記)	-	-	3	×	
Threesome	The Last Breakfast (最後的早餐)	-	-	-	×	
Sinner (罪人)	Sinner (罪人)	1	1	1	×	Adaptation from the song "Bad Guy" of Abin Fong.
Sinner	My Life Shuttle (再見穿梭機)	2	1	1	×	
Sinner	Couple (兩人行)	-	-	-	×	
2011
Something Familiar (似曾相識)	Galaxy (天河)	1	1	1	×	
Something Familiar	Kongming Lantern (孔明燈)	1	1	1	×	
Something Familiar	Something Familiar (似曾相識)	-	-	-	×	
Something Familiar	Happiness More, Loneliness More (越開心越寂寞)	-	-	-	-	TVB8 Song Chart: No. 1.
Something Familiar	The Future You Want (你要的未來)	-	-	-	×	
2012
	Armageddon Prairie (決戰草原)	-	-	-	×	Theme song of UEFA Champions League.
	Unforgettable Moments (難忘時刻)	-	-	-	×	Chorus by Various Artists of Universal Music Group.
Amongst The Forest (在森林和原野)	What Are You Seeking For Life (活著為求甚麼)	1	1	1	×	
Amongst The Forest	Helpers (姐姐)	4	-	-	×	
Amongst The Forest	Please Say I Do	19	10	6	×	
2013
House of Cards (紙牌屋)	Marching Forward (前進)	10	3	3	×	The Hong Kong Children's Choir Featuring.
Polygram Forever (寶記正傳)	Polygram Forever Part I (寶記正傳 Part I)	19	-	-	×	Various Artists Chorus.
Remakes By Hacken (復克)	The Guiding Star (沉默的眼睛)	2	1	1	×	Remake Jacky Cheung's song.
House of Cards (紙牌屋)	House of Cards (紙牌屋)	1	1	1	×	
House of Cards	Please Don't Be Sad (請你不要難過)	-	-	2	×	
Alan & Hacken New + Best Selections (男人的歌)	A Song For Man (男人的歌)	2	9	5	×	Chorus by Alan Tam.
2014
Hacken Lee Friendless Collection (精選到無朋友)	Friendless (無朋友)	1	1	(1)	×	
Hacken Lee Friendless Collection (精選到無朋友)	Sweet Home (屋企)	-	-	-	×	
2015
Hacken Lee Hacken Me (李克勤我克勤)	You're Most Important (你最重要)	1	1	1	1	Four Stations Combined Best Song Championship
Hacken Lee Hacken Me	The World Is Really Small (世界真細小)	1	1	1	1	Chorus by Joey Yung; Four Stations Combined Best Song Championship
Hacken Lee Hacken Me	What Is Love (戀愛為何物)	-	-	4	-	Featuring AGA
Hacken Lee Hacken Me	Simple Beauty (簡單美)	-	-	-	-	Featuring Robynn & Kendy; DBC:16
2016
30g (30克)	Not One Less (一個都不能少)	1	1	1	2	
	(完美這一天)	-	15	-	-	
	(團圓飯)	-	-	-	-	
2017
30g	C3PO	1	1	2	2	
	(時間的錯（合唱版）)	-	-	-	-	Chorus by Joey Yung
	(記憶的味蕾（合唱版）)	-	-	-	-	Chorus by Joey Yung
	Hong Kong Our Home (香港 • 我家)	-	3	-	-	Hong Kong SAR 20th Anniversary Theme Song
30g	(失魂記)	1	1	(1)	2	
30g	(黑膠)	16	-	1	3	Chorus by Mau Hou Cheong@RubberBand
30g	(五十路)	15	-	-	-	
	Dragon's beard candy (龍鬚糖)	1	1	1	2	

Total Championship
903	RTHK	997	TVB	Remarks
29	65	48	44	No . of Quartic Championship: 11

(*) Indicates still standings in charts

(1) Indicates Champion in 2 weeks

(×) Indicates the songs were not sent to TVB due to the HKRIA Copyright Controversy with TVB.

(B) Represents the songs were banned by CRHK, because their original songs policy implications.

The bold fonts represents the song won four championship, or three championship while the HKRIA Copyright Controversy, which excluded TVB.

=== Music Awards ===
Year	Award	Honored Work
1989	Jade Solid Gold Top Ten Songs Award	Top 10 Gold Song: “Eternal Love”
1989	RTHK Top Ten Chinese Gold Songs Award	Top 10 Gold Song: “Eternal Love”
1990	Jade Solid Gold Top Ten Songs Award	Top 10 Gold Song: “Love Sick”
1990	RTHK Top Ten Chinese Gold Songs Award	Top 10 Gold Song: “One Thousand And One Night”
1991	Jade Solid Gold Top Ten Songs Award	Best Music Video Performance Award: “Your Shining Knight”
1992	Jade Solid Gold Top Ten Songs Award	Best Music Video Performance Award: “Blazing Sun”, “Happy In Past Like A Dream”
1993	Jade Solid Gold Top Ten Songs Award	Top 10 Gold Song: “Look Back”
1994	Jade Solid Gold Best Music Video Performance Award	“Wish”
1994	RTHK Top Ten Chinese Gold Songs	Top 10 Outstanding Artist
1995	RTHK Top Ten Chinese Gold Songs	Top 10 Outstanding Artist
1995	Singapore Golden Songs Award	Best New Artist
1996	Metro Radio Hit Awards	Adapted song:“Please Keep Early Hours”
1999	Jade Solid Gold Top Ten Songs Award	Best Composition Award: “Cherry Blossom”
2001	Jade Solid Gold Top Ten Songs Award	Top 10 Gold Songs Award: “Precious Moment”
2001	RTHK Top Ten Chinese Gold Songs	Top 10 Outstanding Artist
2001	IFPI Hong Kong Top Sales Music Award	Ten Best Sales Cantonese Releases: Hong Kong Philharmonic & Hacken Live
2001	Metro Radio Hit Awards	Hit song: “Precious Moment”
2002	Jade Solid Gold Top Ten Songs Award	Top 10 Gold Song: “Treasure Your Friendship”
2002	Jade Solid Gold Top Ten Songs Award	Most Popular Hong Kong Male Artist
2002	RTHK Top Ten Chinese Gold Songs Award	Top 10 Gold Song: “Treasure Your Friendship”
2002	RTHK Top Ten Chinese Gold Songs Award	Top 10 Gold Song: “The Tall Girl” (Singer and Lyricist)
2002	RTHK Top Ten Chinese Gold Songs Award	Top 10 Outstanding Artist
2002	RTHK Top Ten Chinese Gold Songs Award	Highest Sales for Male Artists
2002	IFPI Hong Kong Top Sales Music Award	Ten Best Sales Cantonese Releases: Metro Broadcast & Hacken Lee Live
2002	IFPI Hong Kong Top Sales Music Award	Ten Best Sales Cantonese Releases: Hacken Lee Live in Concert 2002
2002	IFPI Hong Kong Top Sales Music Award	Best Sales Local Male Vocalist
2002	Metro Radio Hit Awards	Hit song: "Victory"
2002	Metro Radio Hit Awards	Hit song: “Treasure Your Friendship”
2002	Metro Radio Hit Awards	Hit song: “Tall Girl”
2002	Metro Radio Hit Awards	Top Male Singer
2003	Jade Solid Gold Top Ten Songs Award	Top 10 Gold Song: "I Am Not Your Man"
2003	Jade Solid Gold Top Ten Songs Award	Most Popular Hong Kong Male Artist
2003	RTHK Top Ten Chinese Gold Songs Award	Outstanding Singer
2003	RTHK Top Ten Chinese Gold Songs Award	Top 10 Gold Song: “Road To Wed Knot”
2003	RTHK Top Ten Chinese Gold Songs Award	Top 10 Gold Song: “Neighbours” (Singer and Lyricist)
2003	RTHK Top Ten Chinese Gold Songs Award	Highest Sales for Male Artist
2003	Metro Radio Hits Top Songs Award	Hit Song: “Road To Wed Knot”
2003	Metro Radio Hits Top Songs Award	Hit Song: “I Am Not Your Man"
2003	Metro Radio Hits Top Songs Award	Hit Song: “When You Are in Love" (with Kelly Chen)
2003	Metro Radio Hits Top Songs Award	Hit Album: Alan Tam & Hacken Lee Live Concert 2003
2003	Metro Radio Hits Top Songs Award	Hit Airplay Index Award: “When You Are in Love" (with Kelly Chen)
2003	Metro Radio Hits Top Songs Award	Hit Male Singer
2003	CRHK Ultimate Song Chart Awards	Top Ten Songs Award: “When You Are in Love" (Fourth place with Kelly Chen)
2003	CRHK Ultimate Song Chart Awards	Top Ten Songs Award: “I Am Not Your Man" (Sixth place)
2003	CRHK Ultimate Song Chart Awards	Ultimate My Favourite Male Singer
2003	IFPI Hong Kong Top Sales Music Award	Ten Best Sales Cantonese Releases: Alan Tam & Hacken Lee Live Concert 2003
2003	IFPI Hong Kong Top Sales Music Award	Ten Best Sales Cantonese Releases: Custom Made
2003	IFPI Hong Kong Top Sales Music Award	Best Sales Cantonese Releases: Alan Tam & Hacken Lee Live Concert 2003
2004	Metro Radio Hits Top Songs Award	Hit Song: Location of Kissing Goodbye
2004	Metro Radio Hits Top Songs Award	Hit Song: My Daring Trapezist
2004	Metro Radio Hits Top Songs Award	Hit Song: Rush Rush (with Alan Tam)
2004	Metro Radio Hits Top Songs Award	Hit Male Singer
2004	Metro Radio Hits Top Songs Award	Hit Airplay Index Award: My Daring Trapezist
2004	Metro Radio Hits Top Songs Award	Hit World's Male Singer
2004	Jade Solid Gold Top Ten Songs Award	Top 10 Gold Song: My Daring Trapezist
2004	RTHK Top Ten Chinese Gold Songs Award	Outstanding Singer
2004	RTHK Top Ten Chinese Gold Songs Award	Top 10 Gold Song: My Daring Trapezist (Singer and Lyricist)
2004	RTHK Top Ten Chinese Gold Songs Award	Most Outstanding Male Singer
2004	RTHK Top Ten Chinese Gold Songs Award	Highest Sales for Male Artist
2004	RTHK Top Ten Chinese Gold Songs Award	Most Popular National Male Artist (Bronze Award)
2004	CRHK Ultimate Song Chart Awards	Top Ten Songs Award: "My Daring Trapezist" (Third place)
2004	CRHK Ultimate Song Chart Awards	Ultimate Singer-songwriter (Bronze Award)
2004	IFPI Hong Kong Top Sales Music Award	Ten Best Sales Cantonese Releases: Alan & Hacken 2004 Concert
2004	IFPI Hong Kong Top Sales Music Award	Best Sales Local Male Vocalist
2005	Jade Solid Gold Award	Top 10 Gold Song: Lost In Seoul
2005	Jade Solid Gold Award	Best Duet Award (Gold): Urgency Cannot Afford Delay
2005	Jade Solid Gold Award	Most Popular Chinese Song (Silver): Love is Irrational
2005	Jade Solid Gold Award	Most Popular Hong Kong Male Artist
2005	Metro Radio Hits Top Songs Award	Gold Song: Lost In Seoul
2005	Metro Radio Hits Top Songs Award	Gold Song: Festival
2005	Metro Radio Hits Top Songs Award	Best Creative Album: Hacken Lee Concert Hall
2005	Metro Radio Hits Top Songs Award	Top Singer-songwriter
2005	Metro Radio Hits Top Songs Award	Top Male Singer
2005	Metro Radio Hits Top Songs Award	Most Admired Male Singer
2005	CRHK Ultimate Song Chart Awards	Top Ten Songs Award: "A Lifeless Home" (Seventh place)
2005	CRHK Ultimate Song Chart Awards	Ultimate Male Artist (Bronze Award)
2005	RTHK Top Ten Chinese Gold Songs Award	Outstanding Singer Award
2005	RTHK Top Ten Chinese Gold Songs Award	Top 10 Gold Songs: Lost In Seoul (Singer and Lyricist)
2005	RTHK Top Ten Chinese Gold Songs Award	Most Popular National Male Artist (Bronze Award)
2005	IFPI Hong Kong Top Sales Music Award	Ten Best Sales Cantonese Releases: 2004 Music is Live - Hacken x Joey
2006	Jade Solid Gold Top Ten Songs Award	Top 10 Gold Song: City of Sorrow
2006	Metro Radio Hits	Top Songs Award: The Woman Before Marriage
2006	Metro Radio Hits	Top Songs Award: City of Sorrow
2006	Metro Radio Hits	Best Creative Album: “Hacken Lee Concert Hall” & “Hacken Lee Seoul Concert Hall II”
2006	Metro Radio Hits	Best Advertisement Song: “The Unbeatable 10”
2006	Metro Radio Hits	Album of the Year: "Hacken Lee Seoul Concert Hall II"
2006	Metro Radio Hits	Best Asia Singers Award
2006	RTHK Top Ten Chinese Gold Songs Award	Outstanding Singer Award
2006	RTHK Top Ten Chinese Gold Songs Award	Top 10 Gold Songs: City of Sorrow
2006	RTHK Top Ten Chinese Gold Songs Award	Highest Sales for Male Artist
2006	IFPI Hong Kong Top Sales Music Award	Ten Best Sales Local Artist
2006	IFPI Hong Kong Top Sales Music Award	Ten Best Sales Cantonese Releases: Hacken Lee Live In Concert 2006
2006	IFPI Hong Kong Top Sales Music Award	Ten Best Sales Cantonese Releases: Hacken Lee Concert Hall
2006	IFPI Hong Kong Top Sales Music Award	Ten Best Sales Cantonese Releases: Hacken Lee Seoul Concert Hall II
2006	IFPI Hong Kong Top Sales Music Award	Best Sales Local Male Vocalist
2007	Jade Solid Gold Song Gold Award	Top 10 Gold Songs: A Lifeless Home
2007	Jade Solid Gold Song Gold Award	Gold Song Gold Award: A Lifeless Home
2007	Jade Solid Gold Song Gold Award	Four Stations Combined Best Song Award: A Lifeless Home
2007	Metro Radio Hits Best Song Award	Hit Song: A Lifeless Home
2007	Metro Radio Hits Best Song Award	Creative Album Award: My Cup of Tea
2007	Metro Radio Hits Best Song Award	Best Performance Award
2007	Metro Radio Hits Best Song Award	Best Asia Singers Award
2007	Metro Radio Hits Best Song Award	World's Hit Song: A Lifeless Home
2007	CRHK Ultimate Song Chart Awards	Top Ten Songs Award: "A Lifeless Home" (Third place)
2007	RTHK Top Ten Chinese Gold Songs	Top 10 Gold Songs Award: A Lifeless Home
2007	RTHK Top Ten Chinese Gold Songs	Outstanding Singer Award
2007	IFPI Hong Kong Top Sales Music Award	Ten Best Sales Local Artistes
2008	Jade Solid Gold Top Ten Songs Award	Top 10 Gold Songs: Humble & Kindness
2008	Metro Radio Hits	Best Asia Singers Award
2008	Metro Radio Hits	Hit Song: Humble & Kindness
2008	RTHK Top Ten Chinese Gold Songs	Outstanding Singer Award
2009	Metro Radio Hits	Best Asia Singers Award
2009	Metro Radio Hits	Metro Radio Hits Original Songs: "Grandma"
2010	Metro Radio Hits	Best Asia Singers Award
2010	Metro Radio Hits	Adapted Song Award: "Sinner"
2010	RTHK Top Ten Chinese Gold Songs	Top 10 Gold Songs Award: "Sinner"
2010	RTHK Top Ten Chinese Gold Songs	Outstanding Singer Award
2011	Metro Radio Hits Award	Original Song: "Kongming Lantern"
2011	Metro Radio Hits Award	Best Asia Singers Award
2011	CRHK Ultimate Song Chart Awards	Top Ten Songs Award: "Galaxy" (Seventh place)
2011	RTHK Top Ten Chinese Gold Songs	Outstanding Singer Award
2012	Metro Radio Mandarin Hits Music Awards	Mandarin Original Song: "Happiness More, Loneliness More"
2012	Metro Radio Mandarin Hits Music Awards	Mandarin Best Asia Singer Award
2012	RTHK Top Ten Chinese Gold Songs	Outstanding Singer Award
2012	RTHK Top Ten Chinese Gold Songs	Top 10 Gold Songs Award: "What Are You Seeking For Life”
2013	Metro Radio Hits World's Top Song	Hit Airplay Index Song: "House of Cards"
2013	Metro Radio Hits World's Top Song	World's Hit Song: "House of Cards"
2013	CRHK Ultimate Song Chart Awards	Top Ten Songs Award: "House of Cards" (Sixth place)
2013	RTHK Top Ten Chinese Gold Songs	Outstanding Singer Award
2013	RTHK Top Ten Chinese Gold Songs	Top 10 Gold Songs Award: "House of Cards"
2014	RTHK Top Ten Chinese Gold Songs	Outstanding Singer Award
2014	RTHK Top Ten Chinese Gold Songs	Top 10 Gold Songs Award: "Friendless"
2014	RTHK Top Ten Chinese Gold Songs	Highest Sales for Group (Alan Tam & Hacken Lee)
2014	CRHK Ultimate Song Chart Awards	Top Ten Songs Award: "Friendless" (Eighth place)
2014	CASH Golden Sail Most Performed Works Awards	Cantonese Pop Work: "House of Cards"
2015	Jade Solid Gold Top Songs Award	Best Duet Gold Award: "The World Is Really Small" (with Joey Yung)
2015	Metro Radio Hits World's Top Song	World's Best singer Award
2015	Metro Radio Hits World's Top Song	World's Best Performance Award
2015	CRHK Ultimate Song Chart Awards	Top Ten Songs Award: "The World Is Really Small" (Second place)
2015	RTHK Top Ten Chinese Gold Songs	Outstanding Singer Award
2015	RTHK Top Ten Chinese Gold Songs	Top 10 Gold Songs Award: "You're Most Important"
2016	RTHK Top Ten Chinese Gold Songs	Outstanding Singer Award
2016	RTHK Top Ten Chinese Gold Songs	Top 10 Gold Songs Award: "Not One Less"
2016	Jade Solid Gold Top Songs Award	Gold Songs: "Not One Less"
2016	Jade Solid Gold Top Songs Award	Gold Song Gold Award: "Not One Less"
2016	IFPI Hong Kong Top Sales Music Award	Good Sales Local Live Recording Release: Joey Yung X Hacken Lee Concert 2015 Live
2016	IFPI Hong Kong Top Sales Music Award	The Best Sales Local Live Recording Release: Joey Yung X Hacken Lee Concert 2015 Live

== Acting career ==
Apart from his singing career, Lee is also an actor and one of the most popular singer-turned-actor in Hong Kong. He has appeared in numerous Hong Kong dramas, movies, and commercial advertisements. He has also appeared in many large-scale charity drives as a guest performer. One of his notable roles as an actor was his role in Legal Entanglement, which won him "Most Favorite Character" award at the 2002 TVB Anniversary Awards.

=== Television series ===
Year	Title	Role
1985	Form 4D (中四丁班)	(Unknown)
1988	Teenage No More (不再少年時)	Mit Ka Yung
1989	Two of a Kind (淘氣雙子星)	Cha Sing Yu
1990	When the Sun Shines (同居三人組)	Dai Yat Foon
1991	A Life of His Own (浪族闊少爺)	Tseung Kit
1991	Fruit Bowl (YES一族)	(Unknown)
1992	Dragon Man(龍影俠)	Chun Ka Bo
1993	Angel's Call (他来自天堂)	Ng Fuk Kei
1994	Huang Feihong: Iron Leung Foon (黃飛鴻之鐵膽梁寬)	Leung Foon
1998	As Sure As Fate (師奶強人)	Lee Siu Sum
2000	Street Fighters (廟街·媽·兄弟)	Yeung Dai Bo
2002	Legal Entanglement (法網伊人)	Mark Ko
2003	Regalia Bay: One Family One Love Story (富豪海灣非凡情緣 之 一家一愛情故事)	Shui Kong

=== Programme host ===
Year	TV channel	Programme
1992	TVB	暑期玩到盡
1992	TVB	叻人新世紀
1994	TVB	叻人新世紀 PART II
1996	TVB	奧運群英至激鬥
1998	TVB	World Cup 1998
1999	RTHK	I.T. File
1999	TVB	Jade Solid Gold (勁歌金曲)
2001	TVB	好客香港攞滿FUN
2002	TVB	香港做得到
2002	TVB	世界盃升級戰線
2004	TVB	Belair Gardens Music Video (富豪花園音樂特輯)
2005	TVB	Miss Hong Kong 2005 Final (香港小姐競選決賽)
2005	TVB	Minutes to Fame (殘酷一叮)
2006	TVB	World Cup (世界盃)

=== Film ===
Year	Title
1991	Fruit Punch (Yes一族)
1993	No More Love, No More Death (太子傳說)
1996	Twinkle, Twinkle Lucky Star (運財智叻星)
2001	Comic King (漫畫風雲)
2001	The Lady Iron Chef (美女食神)
2004	Six Strong Guys (六壯士)
2006	We Are Family (我爱医家人)
2007	Wonder Women (女人本色)
2015	Wong Ka Yan
