= Tin Chiu Street =

Street in Tsat Tsz Mui of North Point in Hong Kong

Coordinates: 22.29139°N 114.203181°E

- Traditional Chinese: 電照街
- Simplified Chinese: 电照街
Transcriptions
Standard Mandarin
- Hanyu Pinyin: Diàn Zhào Jiē
Yue: Cantonese
- Jyutping: din6 ziu3 gaai1

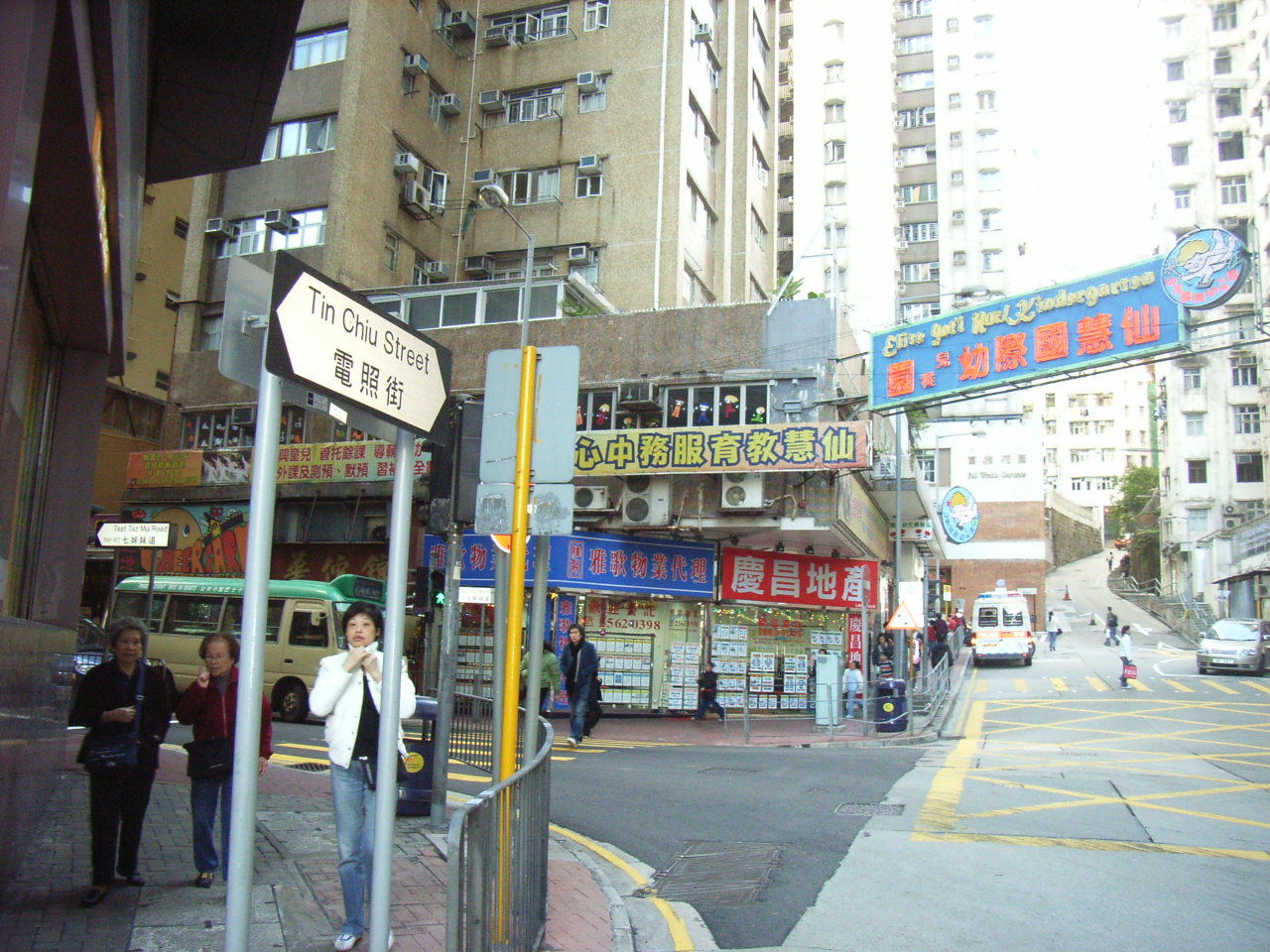
Tin Chiu Street, at its intersection with Tsat Tsz Mui Road.

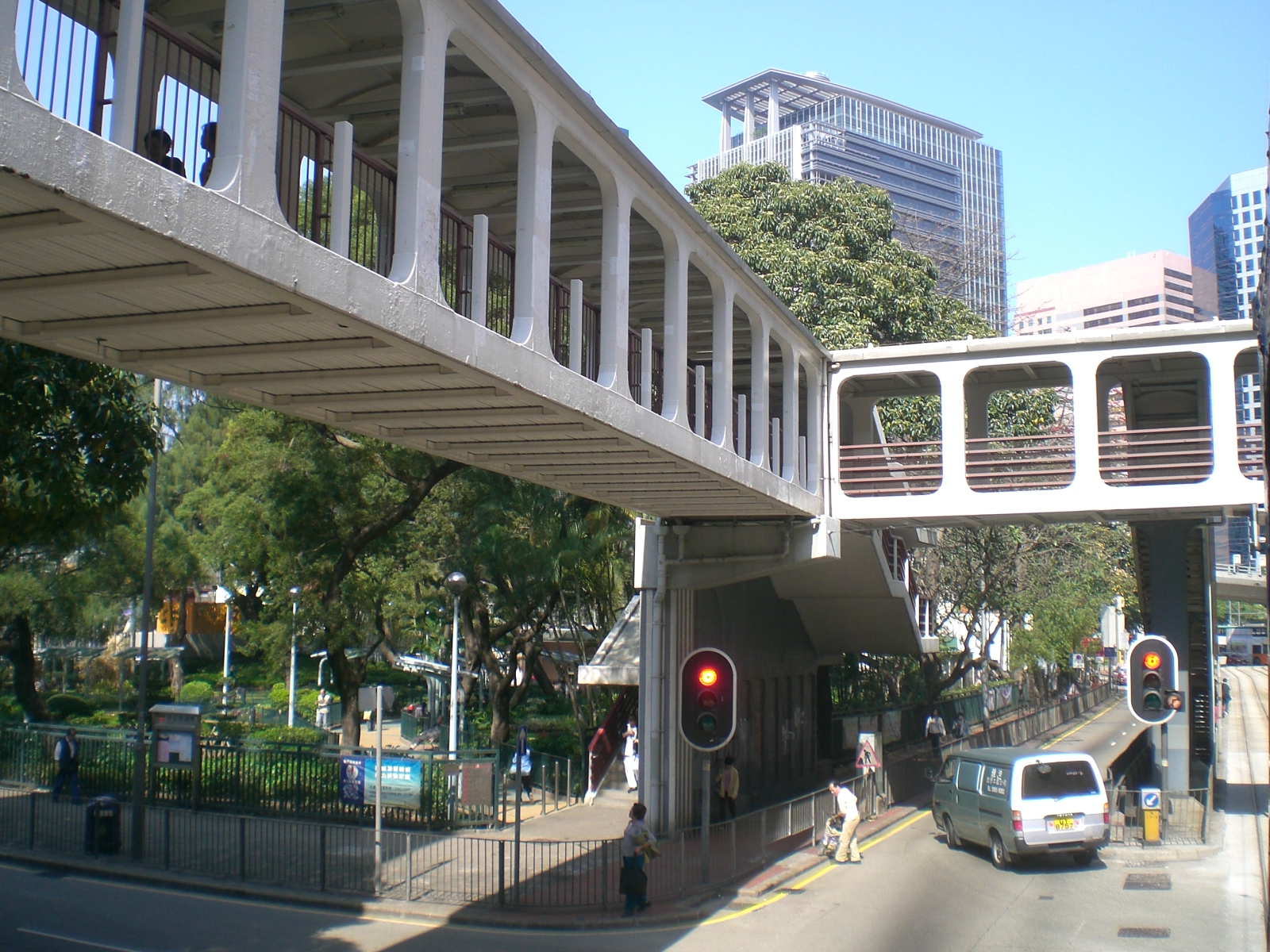
Skyway at the intersection of King's Road and Tin Chiu Street. The entrance of King's Road Playground is visible on the left.

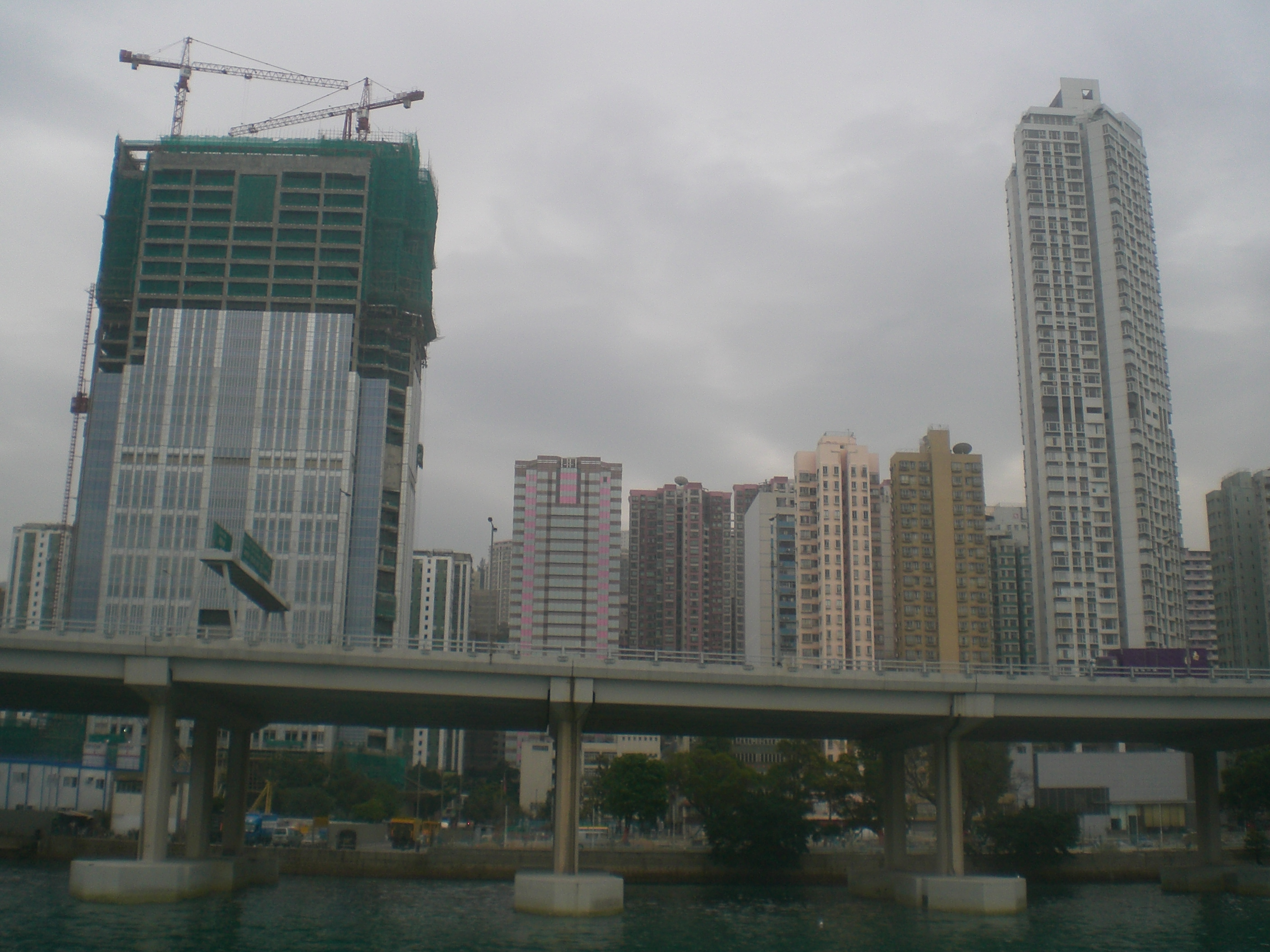
View from Victoria Harbour. The northern end of Tin Chiu Street is visible on the right of the Customs Headquarters Building (under construction). The elevated road in the foreground is the Island Eastern Corridor.

Tin Chiu Street (Chinese: 電照街) is a street in Tsat Tsz Mui of North Point in Hong Kong.

== Location ==
Tin Chiu Street runs south to north, from the base of the hill to Victoria Harbour. The street starts at the junction of Tanner Road and Kai Yuen Street. It intersects with Tsat Tsz Mui Road, King's Road, Marble Road and Java Road.

== History ==
During World War II, the northern section of today's Tin Chiu Street and King's Road Playground were occupied by parts of North Point Camp, initially a refugee camp, and later a prisoner-of-war camp. There is no on-site memorial.

== Features ==
A major office building, Island Place Tower, is located at the junction with King's Road. The headquarters of the Customs and Excise Department are located in the section of the street between Marble and Java Road. The facility commenced operation at the end of 2010 and was officially opened on 21 February 2011.

Several urban parks are located along the street:

- King's Road Playground, between King's Road and Marble Road
- Tin Chiu Street Playground, between Java Road and Marble Road (proposed to be redeveloped as a 110-metre-high residential building, as at 2016)
- Tin Chiu Street Children's Playground, north of Java Road

== See also ==
- List of streets and roads in Hong Kong
