= 1981 RTHK Top 10 Gold Songs Awards =

Hong Kong music awards ceremony

The 1981 RTHK Top 10 Gold Songs Awards (Chinese: 1981年度十大中文金曲得獎) was held in 1982 for the 1981 music season.

== Top 10 song awards ==
The top 10 songs (十大中文金曲) of 1981 are as follows.

| Song name in Chinese | Artist | Composer | Lyricist |
|---|---|---|---|
| 做人愛自由 | Adam Cheng | Joseph Koo | Wong Jim |
| 印象 | Samuel Hui | Samuel Hui | Samuel Hui Peter Lai |
| 倩影 | Ken Choi | Ken Choi | Ip Hon Leung |
| 紅棉 | Roman Tam | Zung Siu-fung (鍾肇峰) | Cheng Kwok Kong |
| 一點燭光 | Michael Kwan | Chelsia Chan | Cheng Kwok Kong |
| 想將來 | Alan Tam | Jan jat (欣逸) | Andrew Lam Man Chung |
| 舊夢不須記 | Annabelle Lui (雷安娜) | Wong Jim | Wong Jim |
| 東方之珠 | Jenny Tseng | Joseph Koo | Cheng Kwok Kong |
| 醉紅塵 | Michael Kwan | Joseph Koo | Cheng Kwok Kong |
| 活色生香 | George Lam | George Lam | Cheng Kwok Kong |

== Other awards ==
| Award | Song or album (if available) | Recipient |
|---|---|---|
| Best C-pop song award (最佳中文流行歌曲獎) | 忘記他 | Wong Jim |
| Best C-pop lyrics award (最佳中文流行歌詞獎) | 找不著藉口 | Jimmy Lo Kwok Tsim |
| Highest honor award (最高榮譽獎) | - | Joseph Koo |
