= Breeze of July =

2007 Hong Kong film by Stanley Tam

- Chinese: 七月好風
- Directed by: Stanley Tam
- Written by: Chan Wai
- Starring: Monie Tung; Sammy Leung; Koo Kam-wah
- Release date: 2007
- Country: Hong Kong

Breeze of July (Chinese: 七月好風) is a 2007 Hong Kong film directed by Stanley Tam and stars Monie Tung, Sammy Leung, and Koo Kam-wah. Adapted from the short story by Hong Kong novelist Chan Wai, it is the feature debut of the experienced film editor and theatre veteran Stanley Tam.

== Plot ==
Lan-Xian has just had her apartment reclaimed by the bank. She plans to move back in with her mother, but her mother dies just before she could talk to her.

She moves in after her mother's funeral and lives with her aunt. She meets her childhood friend Da-Tou who now works as a civil engineer. Da-Tou then helps her to change all the light bulbs in her house. Lan-Xian then discovers that Da-Tou has been visiting her mother regularly while she has been away in Canada, he is so close to her mother that she gave him the house key. Da-Tou offers to give it back to Lan-Xian but she lets him keep it.

Her aunt wants to re-visit Shanghai where she and Lan-Xian's mother originated. Later, debt collectors pastes notes all around her staircase as they discovered her whereabouts. In fear of the debt collectors, Lan-Xian decides to go to Shanghai with her aunt.

Lan-Xian then goes out for karaoke with her friend and returns home drunk. Da-Tou finds her in the street and carries her home on his back. While she sleeps, he tells her that he loves her. She replies by saying, "How do you know that I don't love you?" but he thinks she is drunk. Next morning, Da-Tou makes breakfast for her but she complains about the food. Angered, he leaves the house and the house key behind. Next day, Da-Tou tells Lan-Xian that the London plane that her mother has planted in the street will be chopped soon. He then tells her he does not understand why she keeps running away from her problems and never faces them.

Lan-Xian goes to Shanghai and meets her aunt and mother's old friends. Before she leaves, she sends a SMS to Da-Tou and returns the house key to him. She then learns that her mother's friends were asked to go to Hong Kong, too, but they stayed behind and got married. She then learns that her brother's name Mao Ming is a street name in Shanghai and her own name is a transliteration of the name Lyceum from Shanghai's Lyceum Theatre. Meanwhile, Da-Tou and Lan-Xian tries to call but never able to actually contact each other.

Finally, Da-Tou calls and Lan-Xian receives the call. But due to poor reception, she returns the call to Da-Tou from a pay phone. He tells her that her mom's London plane will be chopped down today. He then asks her to return to Hong Kong and never run away again, as he believes they can find a solution to her problems. Before she can answer, she runs out of credit and the phone hangs up. As soon as the call is hung up, the London plane her mom planted in Hong Kong is chopped down. Lan-Xian looks around her and sees the entire road lined with London planes.

== Production ==
Filming started in October 2006 and took place over five days in Hong Kong and five days in Shanghai. For six months, production was suspended before being restarted since there were funding problems.

== Reception ==
Breeze of July received positive reviews. The Macao Daily News praised Breeze of July, writing that "the director avoided pretentious or obscure storytelling" and "honoured the rhythm of the original work, conveying the parent-child bond through a subdued approach that focused on the characters' inner states, often via voiceover, resulting in a surprisingly appealing film". The Hong Kong Economic Times called the film "rich in Hong Kong elements and local sentiments" and said "it captures those unspoken understandings unique to us Hongkongers".
