= Tsat Tsz Mui =

Neighbourhood east of North Point, Hong Kong

- Chinese: 七姊妹
- Literal meaning: seven sisters
Transcriptions
Standard Mandarin
- Hanyu Pinyin: Qī Zǐmèi
Yue: Cantonese
- Jyutping: Cat1 zi2 mui6

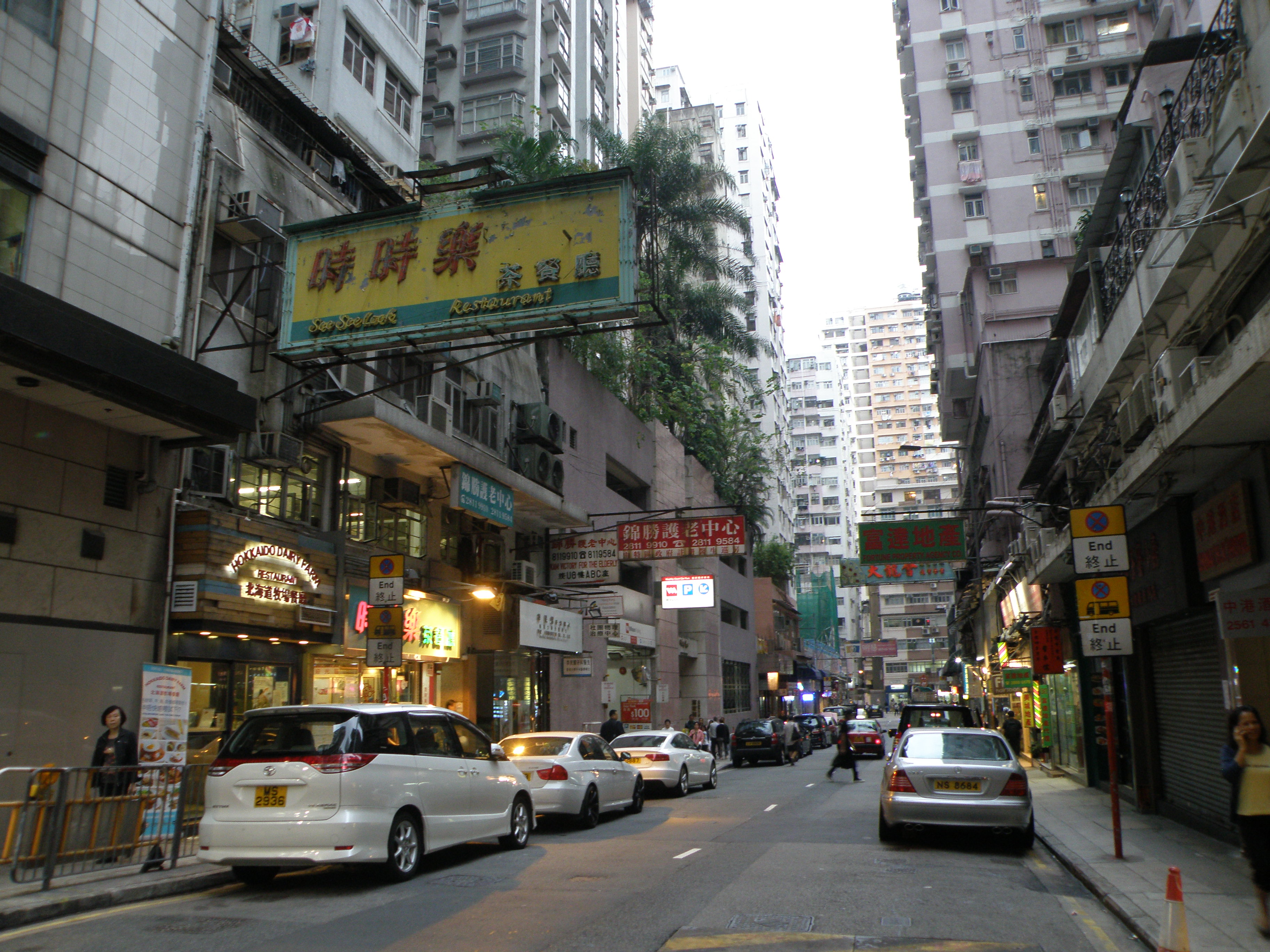
Tsat Tsz Mui Road in North Point.

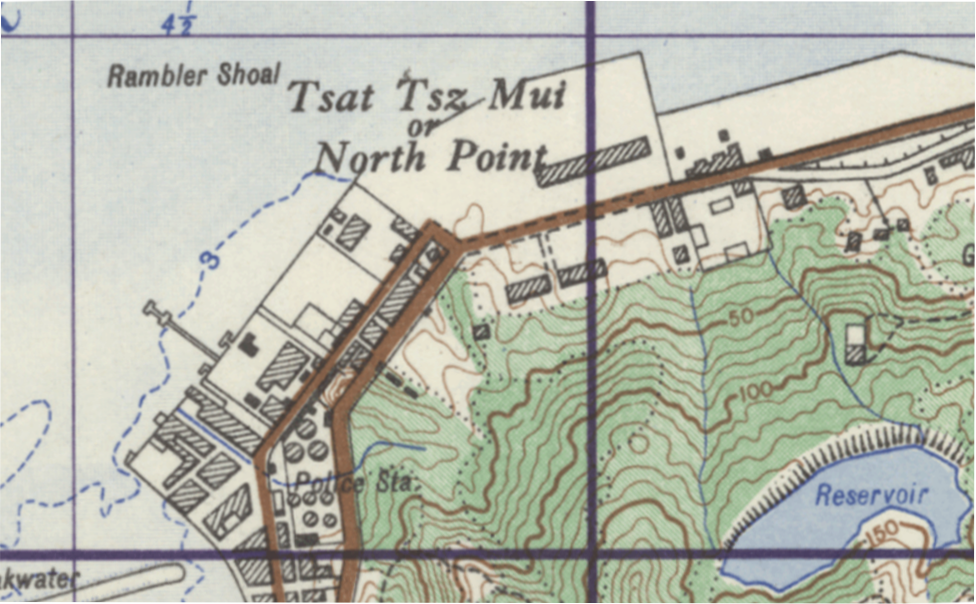
1945 map featuring Tsat Tsz Mui.

Tsat Tsz Mui or Braemar Point is a neighbourhood, formerly a village, east of North Point, in Hong Kong. Tsat Tsz Mui Road is named after the neighbourhood.

== Name ==
Tsat Tsz Mui in Cantonese means "seven sisters". There was a tragic story about them. Once upon a time, there lived a village of Hakka people. Seven girl playmates pledged to be sisters in their lifetime, die on the same day and never get married. One day, the third sister's parents decided to make her marry a man. She did not want to but dared not say a word against her parents. The day before the wedding, all seven sisters committed suicide at the sea shore. The next day, at the bay appeared seven rocks. The villages believed that they must be the seven sisters. The rocks were then named Tsat Tsz Mui Shek (七姊妹石), Seven Sister Rocks, and the village Tsat Tsz Mui Tsuen (七姊妹村), Seven Sister Village.

In 1934, the rocks were buried under the reclamation for urban development.

== History ==
Tsat Tsz Mui is considered the earliest settlement in North Point, although there were villages around the area of North Point in the 19th century, the exact founding dates of those villages remain unknown. The 1819 edition of the Gazetteer of Xin'an County (新安縣志) did not mention Tsat Tsz Mui, however, local residents emphasized Tsat Tsz Mui Village existed for hundreds of years.

The earliest recorded existence of Tsat Tsz Mui Village, was confirmed in the late Qing dynasty by a 1849 census, and a later a 1888 survey map. According to the census in 1849 Tsat Tsz Mui Tsuen (village) had over two hundred inhabitants and over one hundred houses. It was also a popular swimming spot. The original village was located in eastern North Point, at the location of present day Healthy Garden (健威花園) at Tsat Tsz Mui Road.

At the time of the 1911 census, the population of Tsat Tsz Mui was 297. The number of males was 193.

In January 1921, Inland Lot No. 2320, a 21,000 square ft. plot of land north of Tsat Tsz Mui Village (on Kai Yuen Hill's hillside above present-day North Point), was being auctioned. Mr. James Dalziel, a British chief naval engineer who settled for 40 years in Hong Kong working at the Taikoo Sugar Refinery Company, brought this land. In approximately 1921-1924, A large residential property named 'Seven Sisters' was built on the land.

Due to the reclamation of North Point in the 1920s, and the development of King's Road in 1934, Tsat Tsz Mui Village was gradually demolished. Some residents of the village were evicted forcefully by the colonial government by the Crown Lands Resumption Ordinance.

In December 1941, during The Japanese Occupation of Hong Kong in World War II, some Japanese troops landed at the Tsat Tsz Mui Swimming Shed to capture Hong Kong Island.

In 1960, when North Point Estate was completed, people from various placed settled into a new community. From that point onward, the name "North Point" gradually replaced Tsat Tsz Mui as the commonly referred name of the Neighborhood.

== Housing ==
Two public housing estates are located in Tsat Tsz Mui: Model Housing Estate, the oldest existing public housing estate in Hong Kong, with several blocks completed in 1954, and Healthy Village.

== See also ==
- Tin Chiu Street
