= Healthy Village (constituency) =

Constituency in the Eastern District

- Elected constituency for the Eastern District Council
- Boundary of Healthy Village in Eastern District
- District: Eastern
- Legislative Council constituency: Hong Kong Island East
- Population: 13,831 (2019)
- Electorate: 8,041 (2019)

Current constituency
- Created: 1994
- Number of members: One
- Member: Vacant

Healthy Village (Chinese: 健康村) is one of the 35 constituencies in the Eastern District.

The constituency returns one district councillor to the Eastern District Council, with an election every four years. The seat was last held by James Pui Chi-lap.

Healthy Village has estimated population of 13,831.

== Councillors represented ==
Election	Member	Party
1994	Chan Tak-wai	Democratic Foundation→Independent
1999	Chan Tak-wai	Independent
2003	Chan Tak-wai	Independent
2007	Gary Cheng Chi-sing	DAB
2011	Gary Cheng Chi-sing	DAB
2015	Gary Cheng Chi-sing	DAB
2019	James Pui Chi-lap→Vacant (Note: Resigned on 8 July 2021.)	Independent

== Election results ==
=== 2010s ===
Eastern District Council Election, 2019: Healthy Village
Party	Candidate	Votes	%	±%
Nonpartisan	James Pui Chi-lap	2,971	53.24	
DAB	Gary Cheng Chi-sing	2,609	46.76	
Majority		362	6.48	
Turnout		5,600	69.65	
Nonpartisan gain from DAB		Swing		
