= All Star Glam Exam =

Hong Kong game show

- Title card
- 華麗明星賽
- Starring: Grasshopper (hosts)
- Theme music composer: Remus Choy
- Opening theme: Wah Lai Mo Toi (華麗舞台) by Grasshopper
- Country of origin: Hong Kong
- Original language: Cantonese
- No. of episodes: 18

Production
- Executive producer: Chan Yuk-ming
- Production location: Hong Kong
- Camera setup: Multi camera
- Running time: 45 minutes (per episode)
- Production company: TVB

Original release
- Network: TVB Jade
- Release: 27 February – 26 June 2011

All Star Glam Exam
- Traditional Chinese: 華麗明星賽
- Simplified Chinese: 华丽明星赛
- Literal meaning: The Resplendent Star Competition
Transcriptions
Standard Mandarin
- Hanyu Pinyin: Huálì Míngxīng Sài
Yue: Cantonese
- Jyutping: Waa4 Lai6 Ming4 Sing1 Coi3

All Star Glam Exam is a Hong Kong game show produced by Television Broadcasts Limited (TVB). The premiere episode aired on the TVB Jade and TVB HD Jade channels on 27 February 2011 and is slated to run for 18 episodes. Hosted by the Cantopop band Grasshopper, the show also consists of assistant hosts Suyen Cheung, Candy Chang, Nadia Lun, and Nicole Wan, collectively known as "The Star Ladies."

All Star Glam Exam won two awards at the TVB Anniversary Awards, including Best Variety Show and Best Host for Grasshopper. The show also won Best Variety Show at the 2011 Yahoo! Asia Buzz Awards.

== Show format ==
Each episode features various popular Hong Kong celebrities participating in games to win money and/or prizes. Unlike the Super Trio series, the games in All Star Glam Exam are less provocative. Games usually consists of solving puzzles, answering questions, guessing games, and judging.

=== Games ===
- Round 1: King of Posing (明星Pose王)
- Round 2: Glamorous Tasting Competition (華麗品味賽)
- Round 3: The Great 'Grasshopper' Meal (蜢人飯局)
- Round 4: Special games
  - Star Managers (明星經理人), with performers Ceci Tai, Cheronna Ng, Amy Chio (Episode 1)
  - Glamorous Gallery (華麗Gallery)
  - Glamorous Dance Hall (華麗舞廳)
  - Glamorous Garden (華麗花園)
  - Stars' Photo Gallery (明星照相館)
- Round 5: Star Jackpot (明星Jackpot)

== Viewership ratings ==
The following is a table that includes a list of the total ratings points based on television viewership. "Viewers in millions" refers to the number of people, derived from TVB Jade ratings (not including TVB HD Jade), in Hong Kong who watched the episode live. The peak number of viewers are in brackets.

#	Average points	Peaking points	Viewers (in millions)	Ref
01	28	28	1.72 (1.78)	
02	26	–	1.60 ( – )	
03	28	–	1.78 ( – )	
04	26	–	1.66 ( – )	
05	28	–	1.78 ( – )	
06	28	–	1.72 ( – )	
07	26	–	1.66 ( – )	
08	26	–	1.60 ( – )	
09	26	–	1.48 ( – )	
10	26	–	1.54 ( – )	
11	26	–	1.60 ( – )	
12	30	–	1.86 ( – )	
13	30	34	1.92 (2.26)	
14	30	–	1.92 ( – )	
15	26	–	1.60 ( – )	
16	32	34	2.04 (2.26)	
17	30	–	1.92 ( – )	
18	26	–	1.60 ( – )	

== List of episodes ==
#	Original air date	Guests	Topic	HK viewers (in millions)
01	27 February 2011	Wayne Lai, Anita Yuen, Christine Ng, Michael Wong	"Glamorous Entrance" (華麗登場)	1.72
02	6 March 2011	Big Four (Andy Hui, William So, Edmond Leung, Dicky Cheung)	"The Great Big 4 Challenge" (Big 4大挑戰)	1.60
03	13 March 2011	Michael Tse, Bosco Wong, Sharon Chan, Chrissie Chau	"The Duels of Handsome Men and Beautiful Women" (型男美女鬥一番)	1.78
04	20 March 2011	Miriam Yeung, Sammy Leung, Yoyo Mung, Benz Hui	"Laughing Stars Competition" (「笑星」競爭輝)	1.66
05	27 March 2011	Myolie Wu, I Love You Boyz, Carol Cheng	"The Great Duel of the Witty Family" (精靈一族大激鬥)	1.78
06	3 April 2011	Cheung Tat-ming, Kathy Chow Man-kei, Bernice Liu, Natalis Chan	"The Struggle of the Interesting Four Stars" (妙趣四星爭霸戰)	1.72
07	10 April 2011	Cherrie Ying, Dominic Lam, Yumiko Cheng, Sunny Chan, Nancy Sit	"The Great Man and Lady Comparison" (硬漢嬌娃大比拼)	1.66
08	17 April 2011	Ekin Cheng, Charmaine Sheh, Eric Kot, Fala Chen	"The Lively Four Stars' Wisdom Battle" (活力四星「智」激鬥)	1.60
09	24 April 2011	MC Jin, Kary Ng, So Man-fung, Elvina Kong, Kiki Sheung, Evergreen Mak	"The Six Lucky Eloquent Stars"(伶牙俐齒六福星)	1.47
10	1 May 2011	Lawrence Cheng, Niki Chow, Cecilia Yip, Sandy Lamb	"The Great Duel of the Four Smart Stars" (機靈四星大對決)	1.53
11	8 May 2011	Denise Ho, Hanjin, Joyce Cheng, Cha Siu-yan	"The Great Star Battle" (摘星群英大激鬥)	1.60
12	15 May 2011	Aaron Yan, Ella Koon, King Kong, Vincci Cheuk, Joe Ma, Koni Lui	"Interesting Four Lucky Stars" (奇趣六福星)	1.85
13	22 May 2011	Margie Tsang, William Chan, Shirley Yeung, Patrick Dunn, Joey Yung, Chapman To	"Happy Stars Duel" (歡樂「笑星」鬥一番)	1.92
14	29 May 2011	Carol Cheng (Guest host), Twins (Charlene Choi, Gillian Chung), Jim Chim, Julian Cheung	"Ultimate Counterattack Battle" (絕地反擊戰)	1.92
15	5 June 2011	Michael Miu, Leanne Li, Alex Fong, Kitty Yuen, Wong Cho-lam, Athena Chu	"Grasshopper's Final Duel" (草蜢終極對決)	1.60
16	12 June 2011	Natalis Chan, Mandy Lieu, Bosco Wong, Jonathan Lee, Nancy Sit, Louis Yuen, Sammy Leung, King Kong, Wong Cho-lam, Raymond Lam	"Glamorous Challenges of the Stars" (爭華鬥麗星中星)	2.04
17	19 June 2011	Natalis Chan, Mandy Lieu, Bosco Wong, Jonathan Lee, Nancy Sit, Louis Yuen, Sammy Leung, King Kong, Wong Cho-lam, Raymond Lam	"Glamorous Challenges of the Stars" (爭華鬥麗星中星)	1.92
18	26 June 2011	N/A	"Biological Star Glam Exam" (華麗明星親子賽)	1.60
