= Gloria Chan =

Gloria Chan may mean or refer to:

- Chan Hok-yan, former Hong Kong athlete
- Gloria Chan, former member of music group Cookies
