= I Never Changed Love Addiction =

Studio album by Justin Lo
- Released: June 22, 2010
- Genre: Cantopop
- Length: 0:55:35
- Label: Gold Typhoon Entertainment Ltd
- Producer: Justin Lo

我沒有變過 愛的習慣 is Justin Lo's fifth studio album which was released on June 22, 2010.

== Track listing ==
1. "Intro"
2. "無限大"
3. "愛的習慣"
4. "原來你什麼都想要"
5. "合唱歌" with Gloria Tang Tze Kei (G.E.M.)
6. "Second Best"
7. "Love 40"
8. "三歲或八十"
9. "信口開河"
10. "膚淺"
11. "頭條新聞"
12. "She's Out Of My Life"
13. "(一個人唱的)合唱歌"
14. "B.O.K TWENTIETEN"
