= In Control (Kary Ng album) =

Studio album by Kary Ng
- Released: June 8, 2007
- Genre: Cantopop, Mandopop, C-rock
- Label: Gold Label Records
- Producer: Gary Chan

Kary Ng chronology
With a Boy Like U (2006)	In Control (2007)	Lady K: Transformation (2008)

In Control is Kary Ng's second solo album released on June 8, 2007 in CD+DVD and CD formats. It is the champion of the album award of the four channels in Hong Kong (Chinese: 四台聯頒音樂大獎的大碟獎) in 2007.

== Track listing ==
Unless otherwise specified, the songs below were sung in Cantonese.

1. "山歌 (Folk songs)" feat. Justin Lo) Mountain Song
2. "各行各路" Separate Ways
3. "逼得太緊" Under Too Much Pressure
4. Let Me Go
5. Control (Cantonese)
6. "愛過一場" (Mandarin) Loved for a Moment
7. "馬戲團之戀" Love in the Circus
8. Mr. Sorry
9. "失控" Out of Control
10. "怕" Fear
11. "座右銘" Motto
12. Control (Mandarin)
