= Ping Pung =

- Musical career
- Origin: Hong Kong
- Genres: Cantopop, Chinese rock, hard rock
- Labels: Gold Label
- Members: Kary Ng; Jan Lee; Jerry Lee; Mark Lui; DJ Tin "Tim" Ho.

Ping Pung is a Hong Kong–based Cantonese pop-rock group. Gathered by Gold Label in Summer of 2003, the group consists of four members: Kary Ng as the lead singer, Jan and Jerry Lee (who are the younger brothers of the renowned local composer Mark Lui as well as the members of band Online) and DJ Tin "Tim" Ho. Three of the members were of other bands originally.

At the same time, Kary Ng was the lead vocalist of Cookies, another Hong Kong band under the same company.

The band name, which is Ping Pung, has no particular meaning and it is only for fun, as they are to be known for the creativity in music. "Ping Pung" does not represent any Chinese characters.

As with many Chinese rock bands, the band takes an indie approach by producing all of their songs, as well as controlling all elements of the creative process, including the arrangement, melody and lyrics (written by Jan and Jerry). Jan and Jerry also produce and write lyrics for other artists.

In early 2006, after Cookies dissolved, Kary released a solo album entitled With a Boy Like You; which followed the same rock vibe as Ping Pung's rock music.

== Style ==
Their musical style is said to be a mix of pop-rock, rock and hard rock. Their lyrics tend to relate to teenagers.

== Discography ==
- Love & Hate (mini-album, released on 20 August 2004)
