= In Control =

In Control may refer to:

- In Control, a 1989 album by Heavens Gate
- In Control (EliZe album), a 2006 album
- In Control (US5 album), a 2006 album
- In Control (Kary Ng album), a 2007 album
- In Control (Nemesea album), a 2007 album
- "In Control" (The Americans), the fourth episode of the first season of the television series The Americans
- "In Control" (Baker Boy song), a 2019 song
- "In Control", the first English-language song of pop-folk singer Preslava
- "In Control", a song by YoungBoy Never Broke Again from his 2019 album AI Youngboy 2
