= Artistes 512 Fundraising Campaign =

Artistes 512 Fund Raising Campaign (Chinese: 演藝界512關愛行動) was a major fundraising concert held in Hong Kong for the victims of the 2008 Sichuan earthquake. The concert was held on June 1, 2008, and began at 2:28pm, the time the earthquake had struck Sichuan on May 12. The show was 7 to 8-hours long, featuring more than 200 stars from Hong Kong, Taiwan and mainland China. The theme song was a rewritten version of 海闊天空 sung by Beyond (band).

== Preparation ==
On May 22, 2008, members of the fund raising campaign led by Andy Lau got together and waited in a moment of silence. Donations were accepted from June 1 to June 7. A number of major banks have been involved with the donations including Bank of China (Hong Kong), Bank of Communications and The Hongkong and Shanghai Banking Corporation.

== Broadcast and locale ==
The event took place at Pop TV Arena (西九龍中天地) at West Kowloon. The show was broadcast on Hong Kong's TVB, ATV and CableTV. Some channels such as Phoenix TV also broadcast it in parts.

== Participants ==
The following is a list of participants at the concert. The collection of celebrities include singers, actors, actresses, directors, producers and a wide variety of performers.

- + Band
- at17
- Audiotraffic
- Ben (杜浚斌)
- Bob
- Freeze
- HotCha
- I Love You Boyz
- Kellyjackie
- Leo (詹志民)
- Maria Cordero
- Mini Choi (蔡冕麗)
- Rachel
- Shine
- Soler
- Square
- Sun Boy'z
- VEGA
- Chinese Artist Association of Hong Kong
- Big AL (大 AL)
- Terence Yin (尹子維)
- Wan Kwong
- 24 flavours (廿四味)
- Rannes Man (文恩澄)
- Alex Fong (方力申)
- Khalil Fong (方大同)
- Cecilia Fong (方伊琪)
- Fong hou-man (方皓文)
- Mou zeon-fai (毛俊輝)
- Teresa Mo (毛舜筠)
- Grace Wong (王君馨)
- Wong joek-wai (王若卉)
- Wang wei-zhong (王偉忠)
- Michael Wong (王敏德)
- Ivana Wong (王菀之)
- Keith Wong (王凱駿)
- Wong He (王喜)
- Gu tin-nung (古天農)
- Leo Ku (古巨基)
- Ho laam (可嵐)
- Bill Chan (石修)
- Simon Yam (任達華)
- Richie Ren (任賢齊)
- Sky Wu (伍思凱)
- Christine Ng (伍詠薇)
- Michael Wong (光良)
- Anne Heung (向海嵐)
- An Yixuan (安以軒)
- Jackie Chan (成龍)
- Athena Chu (朱茵)
- Judy Chu (朱真真)
- Chu wai-gwan (朱偉鈞)
- Heidi Chu (朱凱婷)
- Teresa Chu (朱翠娟)
- Josephine (吳佩賢|朱勳)
- Chu wan-si (朱韻詩)
- Yuen man-on (阮民安)
- Yu Quan (羽泉)
- Angel Ho (何卓瑩)
- Cynthia Ho (何彥樺)
- Ho gou-yi (何傲兒)
- Josie Ho (何超)
- Denise Ho (何韻詩)
- Andes Yue (余宜發)
- Yue mou-lin (余慕蓮)
- Chita Yu (余翠芝)
- Wu Hsiao-li (吳小莉)
- Kenji Wu (吳克群)
- Sandra Ng (吳君如)
- Denis Ng (吳彤)
- Ng hang-mei (吳杏美)
- Ng fong (吳芳)
- Ron Ng (吳卓羲)
- Lulu Ng (吳亭欣)
- Ng ha-ping (吳夏萍)
- Ng wun-yi (吳浣儀)
- Deep Ng (吳浩康)
- Cathy Wu (吳嘉星)
- Ng lai-chu (吳麗珠)
- Eric Moo (巫啓賢)
- Du yu-hang (杜宇航)
- Dou ting-hou (杜挺豪)
- Vincent Kuk (谷德昭)
- Winnie Shum (沈穎婷)
- Leoi saan (呂姍)
- Coffee Lu (呂晶晶)
- Li ho-ying (李可瑩)
- Hacken Lee (李克勤)
- Allan Che (李志剛)
- Eunix Lee (李卓庭)
- Don Li (李威樂)
- Rain Li (李彩樺)
- Michelle Reis (李嘉欣)
- Li wai-zan (李慧珍)
- Tiffany Lee (李龍怡)
- Renee Lee (李蘊)
- Lee Lai Shan (李麗珊)
- William Chow (周子濠)
- Chow gat-pui (周吉佩)
- Zhou Xun (周迅)
- Jay Chou (周杰倫)
- Lawrence Chou (周俊偉)
- Pak Ho Chau (周柏豪)
- Vivian Chow (周慧敏)
- Ella Koon (官恩娜)
- Shang Wenjie (尚雯婕)
- Jaycee Chan (房祖名)
- Vincy Chan (泳兒)
- Michael Miu (苗僑偉)
- Chet Lam (林一峰)
- Kiki Lam (林子萱)
- Samantha Lam (林志美)
- Lin Chi-ling (林志玲)
- Lam cung (林沖)
- Lam kin-ming (林建明)
- Lam pak-hei (林柏希)
- Lam wai (林偉)
- Lam wai-jan (林惠欣)
- Lam syun-gin (林雋健)
- Karena Lam (林嘉欣)
- Sandy Lam (林憶蓮)
- Jerry Lamb (林曉峰)
- Alyson Hau (侯嘉明)
- Elaine Yiu (姚子羚)
- David Chiang (姜大衛)
- Goeng gou-man (姜皓文)
- Wai lei (威利)
- Ken Hung (洪卓立)
- Karen Chan (珈潁)
- Myolie Wu (胡杏兒)
- Amy Hu (胡美儀)
- Hu Jun (胡軍)
- Bianca Wu (胡琳)
- Woo Fung (胡楓)
- Wai kai-leong (韋啟良)
- Hong Kong wushu association (香港武術總會)
- Hong Kong Repertory Theatre (香港話劇團)
- Hong Kong Performing Artistes Guild
- Lau jing-hung (柳影紅)
- Syun san (孫辰)
- Sun Nan (孫楠)
- Joey Yung (容祖兒)
- Terry Chui (徐浩邦)
- Peco Chui (徐偉賢)
- Dee Shu (徐熙娣)
- Barbie Shu (徐熙媛)
- Jun Joventino Couto Remotique (恭碩良)
- Tai san (泰山)
- Chun kai-wai (秦啟維)
- Yvonne Yung (翁虹)
- Mok yuj-cau (莫旭秋)
- Waa waa (華娃)
- Andrew Yuen (袁文傑)
- Fiona Yuen (袁彩雲)
- Anita Yuen (袁詠儀)
- Fanny Yuen (袁潔瑩)
- Rico Kwok (郭力行)
- Cha cha chan (陳文靜)
- Astrid Chan (陳芷菁)
- Janis Chan (陳貝兒)
- Monica Chan (陳法蓉)
- Eason Chan (陳奕迅)
- Joyce Chen (陳彥行)
- Jason Chan (陳柏宇)
- Aimee Chan (陳茵媺)
- Peter Chan (陳浩德)
- William Chan (陳偉霆)
- Kenneth Chan (陳啟泰)
- Sharon Chan (陳敏之)
- Barbara Chan (陳敏兒)
- Chan gou-jan (陳皓恩)
- Chen Daoming (陳道明)
- Gordon Chan (陳嘉上)
- Chan fong (陳鳳)
- Flora Chan (陳慧珊)
- Kelly Chen (陳慧琳)
- Chan wai-yi (陳慧儀)
- Priscilla Chan (陳慧嫻)
- Daniel Chan (陳曉東)
- Steven Ma (馬浚偉)
- Kenneth Ma (馬國明)
- Ma lai (馬麗)
- Matthew Ko (高鈞賢)
- Gene Gao (高遠)
- Luk hou-ming (陸浩明)
- Anthony Lun (倫永亮)
- Justin Lo (側田)
- Au wing-kyun (區永權)
- Au zeon-tou (區俊濤)
- Albert Au (區瑞強)
- Harlem Yu (庾澄慶)
- Cheung siu-jin (張小燕)
- Pinky Cheung (張文慈)
- Sylvia Chang (張艾嘉)
- Cheung tung-zou (張同祖)
- Cheung yi-cing (張苡澂)
- Jeff Chang (張信哲)
- Zhang jin (張晉)
- Zhang Guoli (張國立)
- A-mei (張惠妹)
- Hins Cheung (張敬軒)
- Julian Cheung (張智霖)
- Cheung tat-ming (張達明)
- Cheung gaa-jing (張嘉瑩)
- Cheung gaa-leon (張嘉麟)
- Dicky Cheung (張衛健)
- Jane Zhang (張靚穎)
- Jacky Cheung (張學友)
- Louis Cheung (張繼聰)
- Jaime Chik (戚美珍)
- Priscilla Chi (戚黛黛)
- Wu gaa-wing (扈佳榮)
- Mandy Cho (曹敏莉)
- Andy Hui (許志安)
- Samuel Hui (許冠傑)
- Valen Hsu (許茹芸)
- Hui waa-yan (許懷恩)
- Teresa Mak (麥家琪)
- Juno Mak (麥浚龍)
- Mak ging-ting (麥景婷)
- Angie Mak (麥雅緻)
- Bonald Leung (梁俊軒)
- Tony Leung Ka-Fai (梁家輝)
- Leung man-yi (梁敏儀)
- Tony Leung Chiu-Wai (梁朝偉)
- Gigi Leung (梁詠琪)
- Edmond Leung (梁漢文)
- Leung dak-fai (梁德輝)
- Dan zi-ning (單紫寧)
- Pang gei-jin (彭紀諺)
- Pang king-chee (彭敬慈)
- Eric Tsang (曾志偉)
- Tsang hong-sang (曾航生)
- Judy Tsang (曾敏)
- Lollipop
- Kathy Yuen (湯怡)
- Sophia Kiki Kao (琦琦)
- Cing si-zeon (程思俊)
- Wilson Cing (程振鵬)
- Cing git-ying (程潔瑩)
- Shu Qi (舒淇)
- Feng Xiaogang (馮小剛)
- Fung gaa-zeon (馮家俊)
- Stephen Fung (馮德倫)
- Dayo Wong (黃子華)
- Tinyee (黃天頤)
- Emme Wong (黃伊汶)
- Wong yik (黃奕)
- Cindy Wong (黃倩婷)
- Wong Ka Keung (黃家強)
- Wong ga-wai (黃嘉威)
- Wong ga-him (黃嘉謙)
- Amiko Wong (黃慧敏)
- Wong oi-yu (黃璦瑤)
- Anthony Wong (黃耀明)
- Hei Se Hui Mei Mei (黑澀會美眉)
- Barry Ip (葉文輝)
- Yip Sai Wing (葉世榮)
- Yip soeng waa (葉尚華)
- Miriam Yeung (楊千嬅)
- Dexter Young (楊天經)
- Yeung kwan (楊坤)
- Irene Wan (溫碧霞)
- Jan si-yu (甄思羽)
- Pou zeon (蒲進)
- FAMA
- Gaa si-lok (賈思樂)
- JJ Jia (賈曉晨)
- Lou fu (路芙)
- Liu on-lai (廖安麗)
- Liu Kai Chi (廖啟智)
- Bernice Liu (廖碧兒)
- Maa gei (瑪姬)
- Dik hau-wai (翟孝偉)
- Ada Choi (蔡少芬)
- Choi lap (蔡立)
- Charlene Choi (蔡卓妍)
- Choi Kwok Wai (蔡國威)
- Tsai Chin (蔡琴)
- Vincent Choi (蔡誌恩)
- Angie Chiu (趙雅芝)
- English Tang (鄧英敏)
- Deng ciu (鄧超)
- Stephy Tang (鄧麗欣)
- Adam Cheng (鄭少秋)
- Yumiko Cheng (鄭希怡)
- Sammi Cheng (鄭秀文)
- Joyce Cheng (鄭欣宜)
- Cheng kai-taai (鄭啟泰)
- Carol Cheng (鄭裕玲)
- Kevin Cheng (鄭嘉穎)
- Stephanie Cheng (鄭融)
- Fan yik-man (樊奕敏)
- Au yeung tak fan (歐陽德勛)
- Kelly Poon (潘嘉麗)
- Leon Lai (黎明)
- Eva Lai (黎燕珊)
- Lau Dan (劉丹)
- Sean Lau (劉青雲)
- Rene Liu (劉若英)
- Wilfred Lau (劉浩龍)
- Alice Lau (劉雅麗)
- Carina Lau (劉嘉玲)
- Andy Lau (劉德華)
- Lau shek-yin (劉錫賢)
- Nancy Sit (薛家燕)
- Fiona Sit (薛凱琪)
- Zing ting (靜婷)
- Paw Hee-Ching (鮑起靜)
- Lowell Lo (盧冠庭)
- Lou hoi-pang (盧海鵬)
- Money Lo (盧敏儀)
- Charles Ying (應昌佑)
- Renee Dai (戴夢夢)
- Dai waan-yu (戴澴雨)
- Michael Tse (謝天華)
- Casey Tse (謝文雅)
- Kay Tse (謝安琪)
- Jennifer Tse (謝婷婷)
- Nicholas Tse (謝霆鋒)
- Chung gin-wai (鍾健威)
- Sherman Chung (鍾舒漫)
- Kenny Bee (鍾鎮濤)
- Pong nan (藍奕邦)
- Artiste Training Alumni Association (藝進同學會)
- William So (蘇永康)
- Julie Su (蘇芮)
- Sou san (蘇珊)
- Shaun Tam (譚俊彥)
- Zoie Tam (譚凱琪)
- Alan Tam (譚詠麟)
- Patrick Tam (譚耀文)
- Jade Kwan (關心妍)
- Shirley Kwan (關淑怡)
- Kenny Kwan (關智斌)
- Kelvin Kwan (關楚耀)
- Him Lo (羅仲謙)
- Lo gwan-zo (羅君佐)
- Lo hou-gaai (羅浩階)
- Lo lan (羅蘭)
- Priscilla Gu (顧紀筠)
- Mini Kung (龔慈恩)

== See also ==
- Artistes 88 Fund Raising Campaign
- Artistes 414 Fund Raising Campaign
