= Love Under the Sun =

2003 Hong Kong film by Andy Lau

- DVD cover
- Traditional Chinese: 愛在陽光下
- Simplified Chinese: 爱在阳光下
- Hanyu Pinyin: Ài Zài Yáng Guāng Xià
- Jyutping: Ngoi3 Zoi6 Jeong4 Gwong1 Haa6
- Directed by: Andy Lau
- Written by: Chan Hing Ka
- Produced by: Johnnie To
- Starring: Andy Lau; Aaron Kwok; Sean Lau; Louis Koo; Sammi Cheng; Kelly Chen; George Lam; Sally Yeh; Nicholas Tse; Cecilia Cheung; Anthony Wong; Karen Mok; Shawn Yue; Gigi Leung; Denise Ho; Hacken Lee; Jordan Chan; Twins; Cookies
- Cinematography: Cheng Siu-keung
- Edited by: Ding Yuin-Shan; Aaron Lau Chi-Kit; Law Wing-Cheong
- Music by: Peter Kam
- Production company: Milkyway Image
- Release date: 27 November 2003
- Running time: 13 minutes
- Country: Hong Kong
- Languages: Cantonese; Mandarin

Love Under the Sun (Chinese: 愛在陽光下) is a 2003 Hong Kong musical short film directed by Andy Lau. It depicts an evening ball in which a rumor spreads among the guests that one among them has contracted AIDS. The film was meant to raise awareness about AIDS and dispel common misconceptions regarding its contagiousness. It features an all-star cast of Lau and various other Hong Kong cinema actors and Cantopop singers. The music is mostly arranged from Classical works such as Für Elise and Carmen with added or changed lyrics.

== Cast ==
- Andy Lau
- Aaron Kwok
- Sean Lau
- Louis Koo
- Sammi Cheng
- Kelly Chen
- George Lam
- Sally Yeh
- Nicholas Tse
- Cecilia Cheung
- Anthony Wong
- Karen Mok
- Shawn Yue
- Gigi Leung
- Denise Ho
- Hacken Lee
- Jordan Chan
- Charlene Choi of Twins
- Gillian Chung of Twins
- Theresa Fu of Cookies
- Stephy Tang of Cookies
- Miki Yeung of Cookies
- Kary Ng of Cookies
- Yumiko Cheng
- Wong You-nam of Shine
- Chui Tien-you of Shine
- Benz Hui
- Kenny Kwan
- Lam Suet
- Edmond Leung
- Emme Wong
- Cecilia Fong
- Lee Fung
- Lung Tin-sang
- Bonnie Wong
