= JTV =

JTV may refer to:

== Broadcasting ==
- Jeepney TV, a Philippine television network
- Jewelry Television, an American television network
- JTV (Indonesian TV channel), a television station in Surabaya, Indonesia
- JTV (New Zealand), a New Zealand Japanese language television channel
- Jeonju Television, a regional television and radio broadcasting company in Jeonju, South Korea
- Justin.tv, a forerunner online video service which established the current-day service Twitch
- Juventus TV, the official video service and television network of the Italian football club Juventus F.C.
- Triple J TV, a television series spin-off of the Australian radio station Triple J

== Music ==
- JTV (album), a 2007 Justin Lo album

== Television ==
- JTV (The Batman), an episode of the animated television series The Batman
- Jane the Virgin, an American drama series
