= Artistes 414 Fund Raising Campaign =

Artistes 414 Fund Raising Campaign (Chinese: 演藝界情系玉樹關愛行動) was a major fund raising campaign held at the Hong Kong Coliseum in Hung Hom, Kowloon, Hong Kong for the victims of the 2010 Yushu earthquake. The concert began at 6pm of 26 April 2010 lasting until 11pm. The 414 stood for 14 April, on the day of the earthquake. The theme song is lyrics rewriting of 憑著愛 sung by Su Rui (another rewriting is 再回首 sung by 姜育恆).

== Preparation ==
More than 300 celebrities participated in the event from both sides of the cross-strait including HK, Taiwan, People's Republic of China. The event raised over HK$35,060,000. Special recordings were also made by US celebrities such as Kenny G and Will Smith. Earlier portion of the fund raiser was hosted by Eric Tsang, Carol Cheng, Sally Wu (吳小莉) and Paw Hee-ching.

== Participants ==
The following are some of the participants.

- Jackie Chan (成龍)
- Alan Tam (譚詠麟)
- Eric Tsang (曾志偉)
- Sammo Hung (洪金寶)
- Jacky Cheung (張學友)
- Andy Lau (劉德華)
- Liza Wang (汪明荃)
- Paula Tsui (徐小鳳)
- Sammi Cheng (鄭秀文)
- Zhang Guoli (張國立)
- Feng Xiaogang (馮小剛)
- Wakin Chau (周華健)
- Sun Nan (孫楠)
- Simon Yam (任達華)
- Donnie Yen (甄子丹)
- Shawn Yue (余文樂)
- Nicholas Tse (謝霆鋒)
- Barbie Shu (大S)
- Dee Shu (小S)
- Gigi Leung (梁詠琪)
- Ariel Lin (林依晨)
- Karen Mok (莫文蔚)
- Lowell Lo (盧冠廷)
- Lo Ta-yu (羅大佑)
- Sandra Ng (吳君如)
- Angie Chiu (趙雅芝)
- Kenny Bee (鍾鎮濤)
- Carol Cheng (鄭裕玲)
- Sally Wu (吳小莉)
- Paw Hee-ching (鮑起靜)
- Harlem Yu (庾澄慶)
- Hacken Lee (李克勤)
- Joey Yung (容祖兒)
- Twins
- Big Four
- Grasshopper
- The Wynners
- Eason Chan (陳奕迅)
- David Tao (陶喆)
- Vivian Chow (周慧敏)
- Leo Ku (古巨基)
- Aska Yang (楊宗緯)
- Kelly Chen (陳慧琳)
- Nick Cheung (張家輝)
- Ekin Cheng (鄭伊健)
- Julian Cheung (張智霖)
- Huang Jianxin (黃建新)
- Huang Zung-lei (王中磊)
- Xu Fan (徐帆)
- Kay Tse (謝安琪)
- Coco Lee (李玟)
- Shirley Kwan (關淑怡)
- Leon Lai (黎明)
- Adam Cheng (鄭少秋)
- Miriam Yeung (楊千嬅)
- TereMereStatus (楊千嬅)

== See also ==
- Artistes 512 Fund Raising Campaign
- Artistes 88 Fund Raising Campaign
