= A Tian =

阿田

Studio album by Justin Lo
- Released: September 30, 2008
- Genre: Cantopop
- Length: 0:38:54
- Label: Gold Typhoon Entertainment Ltd
- Producer: Justin Lo

Justin Lo chronology
JTV (2007)	阿田 (2008)	Air Justin 08 Live (2008)

A Tian (Chinese: 阿田; "A Tian", "our little Tian") is Justin Lo's fourth studio album which was released on September 30, 2008. It was his first released album since Gold Label Records acquired EMI Music Taiwan and EMI Music China (Typhoon Records) in 2008, reforming to Gold Typhoon Entertainment Ltd.

== Track listing ==
1. "三十日"
2. "世界小姐"
3. "信我"
4. "未輸"
5. "闊太"
6. "側太" (feat sister Roxane Lo)
7. "雲"
8. "Intoxication"
9. "中環"
10. "自身"
