= Nadia Lun =

Nadia Lun (Chinese: 倫紫玄) was a former Miss Hong Kong 2008 contestant. She was born on 24 November 1986. She won the Miss Internet Popularity Award and was formerly a TVB actress. She appeared in the Hong Kong gameshow All Star Glam Exam in 2011, along with Suyen Cheung, Candy Chang, and Nicole Wan as a Star Lady.

== Filmography ==
- Twilight Investigation (2010)
- To Be or Not to Be (2014)
