= Justin (Justin Lo album) =

Studio album by Justin Lo
- Released: November 29, 2005
- Recorded: 2005
- Genre: Cantopop
- Length: 41:30
- Label: EMI-GoldLabel
- Producer: Justin Lo, Mark Lui

Justin Lo chronology
Justin (2005)	No Protection (2006)

Justin is the debut album of Justin Lo, released on November 29, 2005.

== Track listing ==
1. "好人"– 3:18
2. "我不是好人" – 4:09
3. "Superstar" – 3:40
4. "Loving You" – 3:53
5. "Erica" – 4:00
6. "命硬" – 3:38
7. "我有今日" – 5:18
8. "冰淇淋之味" – 3:23
9. "Best Thing In My Life" – 3:05
10. "White Christmas" – 3:19
11. "好人" (Original) – 3:47

== Sales ==
Date	Sales	
December 20, 2005	21	25,000 (Gold*)

Note that since the record market of Hong Kong is significantly smaller than that of the North American market, the definitions of "Gold" and "Platinum" statuses are scaled down accordingly. By Hong Kong standards, artists only need to sell 25,000 copies of an album for that album to receive Gold status. Meanwhile, Platinum status need 50,000 copies.
