= JTV (album) =

Studio album by Justin Lo
- Released: November 16, 2007
- Genre: Cantopop
- Length: 0:52:50
- Label: Gold Label Entertainment Ltd
- Producer: Justin Lo

Justin Lo chronology
港樂X側田In Love with the Philharmonic Live CD|In Love With the Philharmonic (2007)	JTV (2007)	阿田 (2008)

JTV is the third studio album by Hong Kong singer Justin Lo. It was released on November 16, 2007, and sold 20,000 copies in the first two days.

== Track listing ==
1. "WA-KA-BAM (Intro)"
2. "紅地氈"
3. "一句"
4. "男人KTV"
5. "遲鈍"
6. "貝殼"
7. "兩個女人"
8. "Morning After"
9. "難關"
10. "卡通歌"
11. "頭條新聞"
12. "Stuck On U"
13. "路人甲 (國語)"
14. "c u in my dream (Outro)"
