= Artistes 88 Fund Raising Campaign =

Artistes 8.8 Fund Raising Campaign (88水災關愛行動) was a major fund raising campaign held in Hong Kong for the victims of the 2009 Typhoon Morakot. The concert began at 7:30pm on 17 August 2009. The 88 stood for 8 August, one of the day of the typhoon. The main host for the concert was HK actor Eric Tsang and Taiwan actress Sylvia Chang. The show featured more than 200 stars mostly from Hong Kong. The show was also tele-linked live to Taiwan and some of their stars.

== Preparation ==
A number of other hosts also took part including Paw hee-ching, Harlem Yu, Wu hsiao-li (吳小莉), Astrid Chan (芷菁). A theme song "Many hearts prevail" (滔滔千里心) was also part of the show. Major banks such as Bank of China and Fubon Bank also took part in managing the funds.

== Participants ==
The following are some of the participants.

- Alex Fong (方力申)
- Miriam Yeung (楊千嬅)
- Sammi Cheng (鄭秀文)
- Andy Lau (劉德華)
- Aaron Kwok (郭富城)
- Leon Lai (黎明)
- Jacky Cheung (張學友)
- Tsai Chin (蔡琴)
- Jam Hsiao (蕭敬騰)
- David Tao (陶喆)
- Vivian Chow (周慧敏)
- Leo Ku (古巨基)
- Wakin Chau (周華健)
- Zhang Guoli (張國立)
- Angelica Lee (李心潔)
- Hacken Lee (李克勤)
- Kay Tse (謝安琪)
- Richie Ren (任賢齊)
- Ekin Cheng (鄭伊健)
- Jordan Chan (陳小春)
- Kenny Bee (鍾鎮濤)
- Wu wai-zung (胡慧中)
- Anson Hu (胡彥斌)
- Hins Cheung (張敬軒)
- Julian Cheung (張智霖)
- Tony Leung (梁家輝)
- Rosamund Kwan (關之琳)
- Karen Mok (莫文蔚)
- Charlene Choi (蔡卓妍)
- Gary Chaw (曹格)
- Grasshopper (草蜢)
- FAMA (農夫)
- The Wynners (溫拿)
- Roger Kwok (郭晉安)
- Michael Tse (謝天華)
- Ron Ng (吳卓羲)

== Edison Chen controversy ==
Edison Chen tried to make an appearance into the fund raising campaign. Fellow actor Eric Tsang tried to talk HK station TVB into letting him in. TVB computer technicians were ready to put Chen's name up should he appear at the concert, but Chen was turned down by the station. He did not appear on stage.

== See also ==
- Artistes 512 Fund Raising Campaign
- Artistes 414 Fund Raising Campaign
