= With a Boy Like You =

With a Boy Like U

Studio album by Kary Ng
- Released: January 31, 2006
- Recorded: 2005 in Hong Kong
- Genre: Cantopop, Mandopop, C-rock, urban pop-rock

Kary Ng chronology
With a Boy Like U	In Control

With a Boy Like U is the official title of the debut solo album by Kary Ng, released on January 31, 2006. It is more commonly known among English speakers as With a Boy Like You.

== Track listing ==
All songs are sung in Cantonese unless stated.

- 1. "With A Boy Like U"
  - Language: English
- 2. "戀愛天才" "Love Talent"
- 3. "句句我愛你" (Guei Guei Ngo Ngoi Nei) "Everyword Is I love You"
- 4. "愛你變成恨你" "My love for you has turn to hate"
- 5. "假想敵" "Imaginary Enemy"
- 6. "耍我" (Sa Ngo) "Need Me"
- 7. "明知做戲" (Ming Ji Jo Hei) "Intentional Act"
- 8. "欣澳別戀" "Joyful Australia Do not Love"
- 9. "給情敵的情書" "For Love Rivals Love Letter"
- 10. "南方的風"(Nan Fang de Feng) "South Wind"
  - Language: Mandarin
- 11. "台北四天三夜"(Tai Pei Shi Tian San Ye) Taipei Four Days, Three Nights)
  - Language: Mandarin
