= Kary Ng =

Hong Kong singer

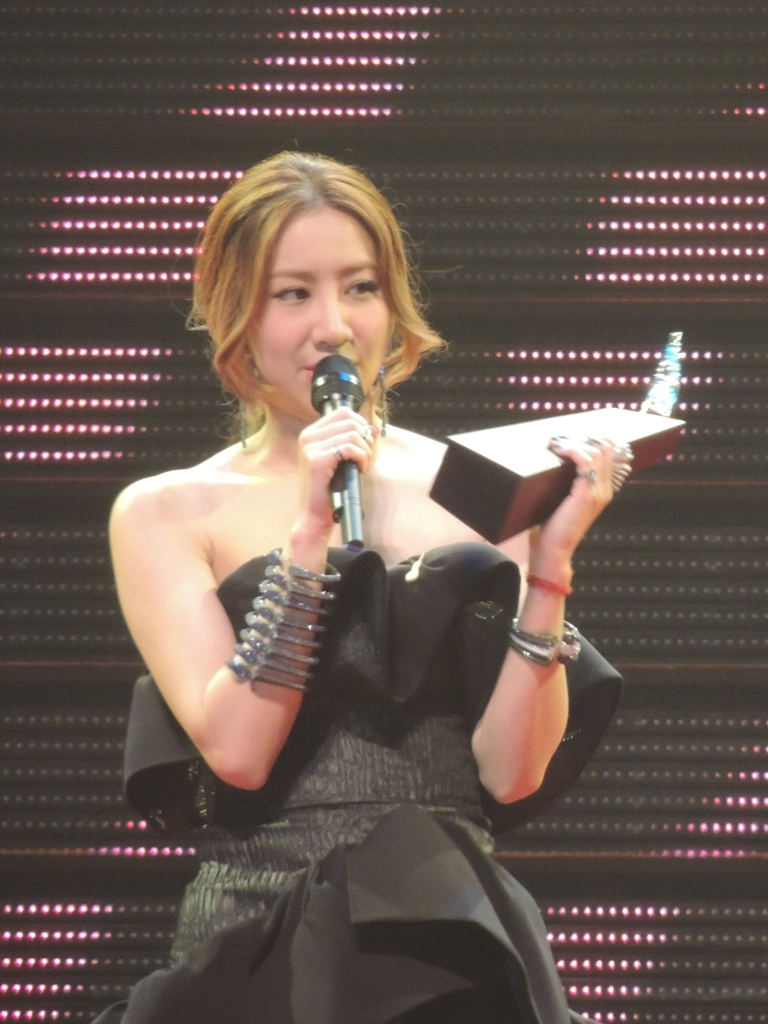
- Ng in 2013
- Born: 吳家穎; 9 June 1986 (age 40); Hong Kong
- Occupations: Singer-songwriter; actress
- Years active: 2002–present
- Spouse: Brian Hung (m. 2015)
- Awards: Hong Kong Film Awards – Best Original Film Song; 2007 Love Is Not All Around for the song "Under Too Much Pressure"

Chinese name
- Traditional Chinese: 吳雨霏
- Simplified Chinese: 吴雨霏
Transcriptions
Standard Mandarin
- Hanyu Pinyin: wu2 yu3 fei1
Yue: Cantonese
- Jyutping: ng4 jyu5 fei1
- Musical career
- Origin: Hong Kong
- Genres: Pop rock, C-rock, Cantopop & Mandopop, Synthpop
- Instruments: Vocals, guitar, piano, flute, drums
- Labels: EMI, Gold Label Records(2002–2011); Cinepoly Records (2011–present)
- Website: k4kary.com Weibo

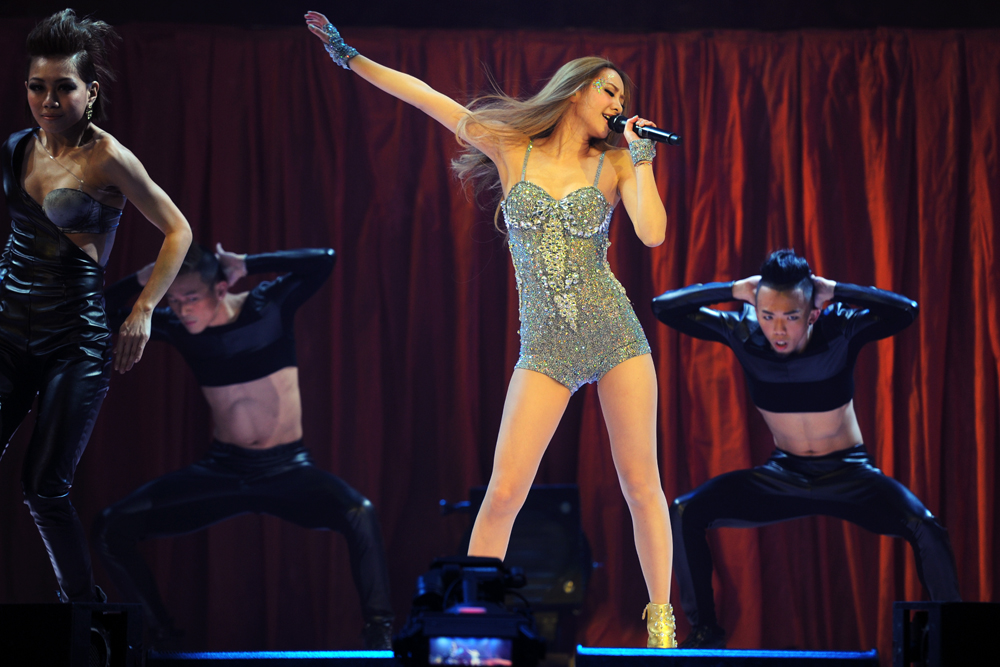
Ng at her second coliseum concert THE PRESENT

Kary Ng (born 9 June 1986) is a pop rock singer in Hong Kong. When she debuted, she had been a member of a music group, Cookies; however, the members of Cookies were eventually arranged to explore their respective solo careers in 2005, and the group is now disbanded. She had temporarily been the lead vocals of rock band Ping Pung in 2004, but Ping Pung had also disbanded after only releasing one album that same year. Commencing in 2005, Ng had officially begun developing her career as a solo artist.

As a girl, Ng had studied at the Canadian International School of Hong Kong. She had made references to her nickname "Lady K" in the album titles Lady K Live and Lady K: Transformation.

== Career ==
In 2002, at age 15, Ng was one of the nine members and also youngest of the girl band Cookies, signed under record giant Gold Label of EMI Hong Kong. That same year, she became the youngest recipient to have ever earned a CRHK music award when Cookies were awarded "Best Group Newcomer – Bronze Award"; she was 16 at the time and currently still holds this record. Her male counterpart of this record is Nicholas Tse, who was 17 when he received "Best Male Newcomer – Silver Award" in 1999.

In 2003, Cookies were downsized from the original nine members to only four members. Ng was one of the four members who successfully remained with the group, along with Stephy Tang, Theresa Fu, and Miki Yeung.

In 2004, she joined another rock band – Ping Pung and released the album Love & Hate. During this time, she continued to retain her membership in Cookies.

In 2006, Ng released her solo debut album With A Boy like You. Her song 「愛你變成恨你」won her her first Commercial Radio Hong Kong Top Ten Gold Songs award. At the time, Ng had made a record of being the youngest female singer who had ever been awarded with a Top Ten Gold Song award from CRHK at the age of 20; she had kept this record until 2012, when Kimberley Chen, a Taiwanese singer, won a Top Ten Gold Song award from CRHK at the age of 18.

In 2007, her second solo album, In Control, earned her the "Media Award – Album" from the Four Station Joint Music Awards, which presents its awards based on charting results from all four of the music stations in Hong Kong. Ng was the second female singer to have ever received this award, with Miriam Yeung being the first in 2004. She is currently the youngest female recipient of this award, as she was only 21 at the time; her male counterpart is, again, Nicholas Tse, who received the same award in 1999 for his album Believe, when he was 19.

In January 2008, Ng held three shows for her first concert "Kary Lady K Live 08". On 30 May 2008, she also appeared as the special guest for Leo Ku's North American The Magic Moments Concert in Toronto, Ontario, Canada in front of a crowd of 10,000 people.

In April 2008, Ng had won the award for "Best Original Film Song" for「逼得太緊」at the 27th Hong Kong Film Awards, with the track being the theme song of the film, Love Is Not All Around. The film had been nominated in only two categories, with the other being Linda Chung nominated for Best New Performer; "Best Original Film Song" was the only award the film took home that night. 「逼得太緊」proved to be her most successful song at music awards shows, as it had won a Top Ten Songs of the Year award from each of the four radio stations in Hong Kong.

In July 2008, her third album Lady K: Transformation was released. Ng began experimenting with various styles of pop while keeping her trademark rock sound, as there are notable synthpop, R&B, contemporary R&B and dance-pop undertones on several tracks of the album. In December, her first Best Selection album "Kary 18 CUTS" was released, along with three new songs.

In February 2009, she performed at the S.U.C.C.E.S.S. Charity Gala at Vancouver, British Columbia, Canada with many other artists. In October, the exclusive Asian Bonus Track of the song "Everyday" (in Cantonese) was released, featuring her and singer Justin Lo for the smash hit Disney Channel Original Movie, High School Musical 2 (soundtrack).

On 24 April 2009, Ng and Alex Fong appeared at the Melbourne Arts Center for their Melbourne '09 Show. In the same year, her new EP "Keep Breathing" was out. The promotion for the EP included "Neway Music Live 09 x Kary".

In 2010, Ng cooperated with Hong Kong underground rock band Hardpack and released an EP 合+歡 and announced to have her first concert in Hong Kong Coliseum.

On 30 January 2011, Ng had her first concert, Kary On Live 2011, in Hong Kong Coliseum. Her EP, Carry On, was released before the HKC concert, and it is the last record that she would release with Gold Label Records before her contract terminated the same year. In the same year, she signed with Cinepoly Records. In October, Ng became the only Asian female singer to perform in the Universal Music Group's annual summit in South Korea.

In 2012, Ng reached another milestone in her singing career, as she received the "Best Female Singer － Bronze Award" from the CRHK Music Awards, marking the first "Best Female Singer" award from the CRHK Music Awards that she had ever received.

In 2013, Ng held her second concert in Hong Kong Coliseum, The Present Concert 2013 on 8 and 9 January. At17 and Gigi Leung appeared as planned guest performers while her previous colleagues Justin Lo and Stephy Tang, Miki Yeung, and Angela Au appeared as surprise guest performers; Lo appeared on 8 January show while the three former Cookies members appeared on 9 January show. On 11 May of the same year, Kary held another show of The Present Concert 2013 in Macau at The Venetian Macao.

On 20 November of the same year, Kary Ng released her 12th album, State of Mind; it is the first album where she had participated in the compositions of each recorded track. "生我的命" from the album received a Top Ten Song award from the CRHK Music Awards, making it the first time Kary has received a Top Ten Song award for one of her own compositions. It is also the first year where she had received an "Outstanding Singer Award" from the RTHK Top 10 Gold Songs Awards.

== Personal life ==
Before reconciling and getting married, Ng had dated previous professional tennis player, Brian Hung, from 2007 to 2011; they had begun as childhood friends, having met when Ng was thirteen years old. During the press conference for her first Hong Kong Coliseum concert, Kary on Live 2011 in December 2011, Ng revealed that she and Hung have parted peacefully after four years of dating. During her Kary on Live 2011 concert, as an introduction to her song 「絕配」, Ng made a speech that alluded to her past relationship with Hung:

Four years ago, I fell in love with someone. We experienced a lot together. From him, I learned how to love someone, how to forgive, how to cherish... At the time, I felt like a princess who has met her prince; I felt like I found my perfect match, but I have realized that sometimes, being a perfect match isn't enough. At many times, we'll experience many hardships. We might experience a lot of judgment and criticisms from others. However, I will still believe in love. I will still courageously dare to love. I hope all of you will also have this form of courage.

— Kary Ng, Kary On Live 2011, Introduction to 「絕配」(Translation)

On 18 October 2014, Ng disclosed that she has reconciled with Brian Hung, her previous boyfriend of four years. She expressed that they had reconnected through church, as she had resumed her attendance earlier in the year, and that her parents strongly support her relationship. After his tennis career, Hung is now working in the finance industry. On 17 January 2015, there had been reports claiming that Ng will be getting married with Hung in United States during a vacation between the two families while holding a wedding banquet in Hong Kong in July 2015.

== Discography ==
=== Cookies (as a member of girl band) ===
- April 2002 – Happy Birthday
- 23 Dec 2002 – Merry Christmas
- 13 Aug 2003 – All the Best (新曲 + 精選)
- January 2004 – 4 Play
- 17 Dec 2004 – 4 In Love

=== Ping Pung (as a member of rock band) ===
- 20 Aug 2004 – Love & Hate

=== Solo albums ===
- 2006.01.26 With A Boy Like You
- 2006.06.08 In Control
- 2008.07.16 Lady K Transformations
- 2008.12.12 Kary 18 CUTS (New + Best Selection)
- 2009.10.16 Keep Breathing EP
- 2010.08.06 Kary + Hardpack EP 合+歡
- 2011.01.28 Carry On
- 2011.11.15 Myself (我本人)
- 2011.11.18 Simpler than LOVE (New + Best Selection)
- 2012.07.20 My January
- 2013.11.20 State of Mind
- 2014.05.26 Across
- 2015.03.23 Glamorous (豔羨)

=== Other ===
- 22 August 2005 – 903 id club Sammy & Kitty Drama Show – Viva l'amour
- 17 May 2006 – All About Women (金牌女兒紅)- 偏愛 (with Stephy Tang (鄧麗欣))
- 15 August 2006 – Love @ First Note Original Movie Soundtrack (CD+DVD)
- 14 June 2007 – Another Chivas Music Experience Concert Live – 飛女正傳
- 26 July 2007 – Chan Fai Yeung – 12 Faces of Women (CD+DVD) Track 12 - 想這樣得那樣
- 27 August 2008 – Theme Songs from Gold Label (2CD) – 距離
- 18 June 2009 – Chinese Paladin 3 OST – 生生世世愛
- 24 July 2009 – Beaming – Try... (with Rubberband)
- 25 April 2012 – ReImagine Leslie Cheung (CD + DVD) – 潔身自愛

=== Concert album ===
- 4 March 2008 – Kary Lady K live 08
- 23 May 2008 – MOOV Live 吳雨霏 (digital album)
- 13 April 2011 – Kary on Live 2011 (DVD/Blu-ray)
- 26 March 2013 – The Present Concert

== Filmography ==
Film and television
Year	Title	Role	Notes
2002	Nine Girls and One Ghost	虎兒	Debut film, along with other Cookies members
2003	Feel 100% 2003	Employee at Tom&Jerry	Guest Role
2003	Love Under the Sun	Andy Lau's supporting dancer (with other Cookies members)	Musical Short Film for AIDS awareness Directed by Andy Lau
2004	My Sweetie	江可愛	Theme Song: 「愛是最大權利」
2005	Robots	Cappy	Voice Role (Cantonese Version)
2005	Dragon Reloaded	Airport Security Unit member	Guest Role
2006	McDull, the Alumni	Medical Intern	Guest Role
2006	Love @ First Note	Kristy	First Lead Role in a film
2007	Love Is Not All Around	碧蓮	Voice Role for Cantonese Dub; character portrayed by Wong Yat Bing; Theme Song:「逼得太緊」 27th Hong Kong Film Awards "Best Original Film Song" -「逼得太緊」
2008	Nobody's Perfect	Alexis	Co-lead role with Stephy Tang
2011	ICAC Investigators 2011	李 楠	Episode 5
2013	The Croods	Eep	Voice Role (Cantonese Version)
2021	King Maker IV	Judge	EP21-27

== Concert ==
- 5 January 2005 – 903 Hit Four Concert with Shawn Yue, Wilfred Lau, Fiona Sit
- 11, 13, 14 January 2008 – Kary Lady K live 08 in Kowloonbay International Trade & Exhibition Centre Star Hall
- 15 November 2008 – 903 Id Club with Leo Ku, Ivana Wong, Louis Cheung
- 24 April 2009 – Kary n Alex Concert in The Arts Centre (Melbourne) (with Alex Fong)
- 16 October 2009 – Neway Music Live 09 x Kary in Kowloonbay International Trade & Exhibition Centre Rotunda 3
- 30 January 2011 – Kary On Live 2011 in Hong Kong Coliseum
- 7 November 2011 – Metro Radio HD Digital Concert in AsiaWorld-Expo Arena with Eason Chan, Paul Wong & The Postman
- 5 October 2012 – Kary Ng Myself Concert 2012 in Guangzhou Zhongshan Memorial Hall
- 8, 9 January 2013 – Kary Ng The Present Concert in Hong Kong Coliseum
- 11 May 2013 – The Present Concert in Macau The Venetian's Cotai Arena
- 21 May 2013 – 903 Id Club with Fiona Sit, Ivana Wong, Eman Lam
- 22 November 2013 – State Of Mind Concert in Kowloonbay International Trade & Exhibition Centre Star Hall
- 7 June 2014 – Summerhits Macau in Macau The Venetian's Cotai Arena with Eric Suen, Kelvin Kwan, Pong Nam, Robynn and Kendy
- 15 February 2015 – Eternal Love Live in Kowloonbay International Trade & Exhibition Centre Music Zone@E-MAX
