= Chan Hok-yan sex scandal =

2010 Hong Kong scandal

The Chan Hok-yan sex scandal was a highly publicized case in Hong Kong that started in December 2010, involving former Asian Games athlete Chan Hok-yan (陳學殷) and an anonymous wealthy individual referred to as "rich tycoon X" (富商X) by the media. The scandal resulted in a court case where Chan was accused of blackmailing X for HK$3 million over a sex tape that was intended to be used as evidence against X. The identity of X is protected due to their wealth, and the judge and Hong Kong court have emphasized that it must remain confidential.

== Profile ==
Prior to the scandal, Chan Hok-yan is mostly known in Hong Kong as a boat rower who participated at the Bangkok 1998 Asian Games at the age of 15. In 2010 she is 27 years old, married with a son.

The rich tycoon is known to be a 72-year-old business man (born 1928). Though some sources suggest he is 73 years of age, and that they are 46 years apart. He is married.

== Scandal ==
X first met Chan Hok-yan in a Chinese restaurant in 2005, when she worked as a receptionist. Six months later, he arranged to have Chan Hok-yan work in his company as a shipping clerk. Later, he gave her two checks for HK$70,000 and HK$100,000 when he learned she was pregnant and getting married in 2006. They met three times in a motel in 2010, and had sex in the second meeting.

On 12 May 2010 X received an unsigned letter accusing him of treating her like a prostitute. Chan threatened to publicize their sexual relationship with a videotape if X did not deposit HK$3 million into a bank account. Thus began the court case where Chan is accused of blackmailing X.

== Court case ==
On 6 December 2010 X testified at the HK District court. X protected his identity behind a screen, spoke in Cantonese with a mainland China accent and appealed for leniency. X said Chan Hok-yan was having financial difficulties and had no money to pay for school fees. Later in an interview, Chan admitted she never had a videotape. She just wanted to scare him. During the case, she proclaimed loudly that she was "Not a chicken (prostitute)".

On 14 January 2011 Chan has been sentenced to 15 month in imprisonment by the District Court. The judge said he did not think she was remorseful at all.

== Responses ==
The case has generated nonstop heated responses online urging netizens to guess who the rich tycoon is. According to the lawyer, he warned the public that the name of X cannot be revealed, and compared it to "provoking the fight carries the same offence as participating in the fight".

== Comparison ==
In the 1980s a similar blackmail case occurred involving a Mr X unknown male. Celebrity TVB staff member Ivan Ho (何守信) was eventually revealed to be the mystery person. Another case occurred in August 2011 involving mainland female Ki Chun-yim (祈春艷) and another Mr X.

== See also ==
- Face (sociological concept)
