= Justin Lo =

Hong Kong American singer (born 1976)

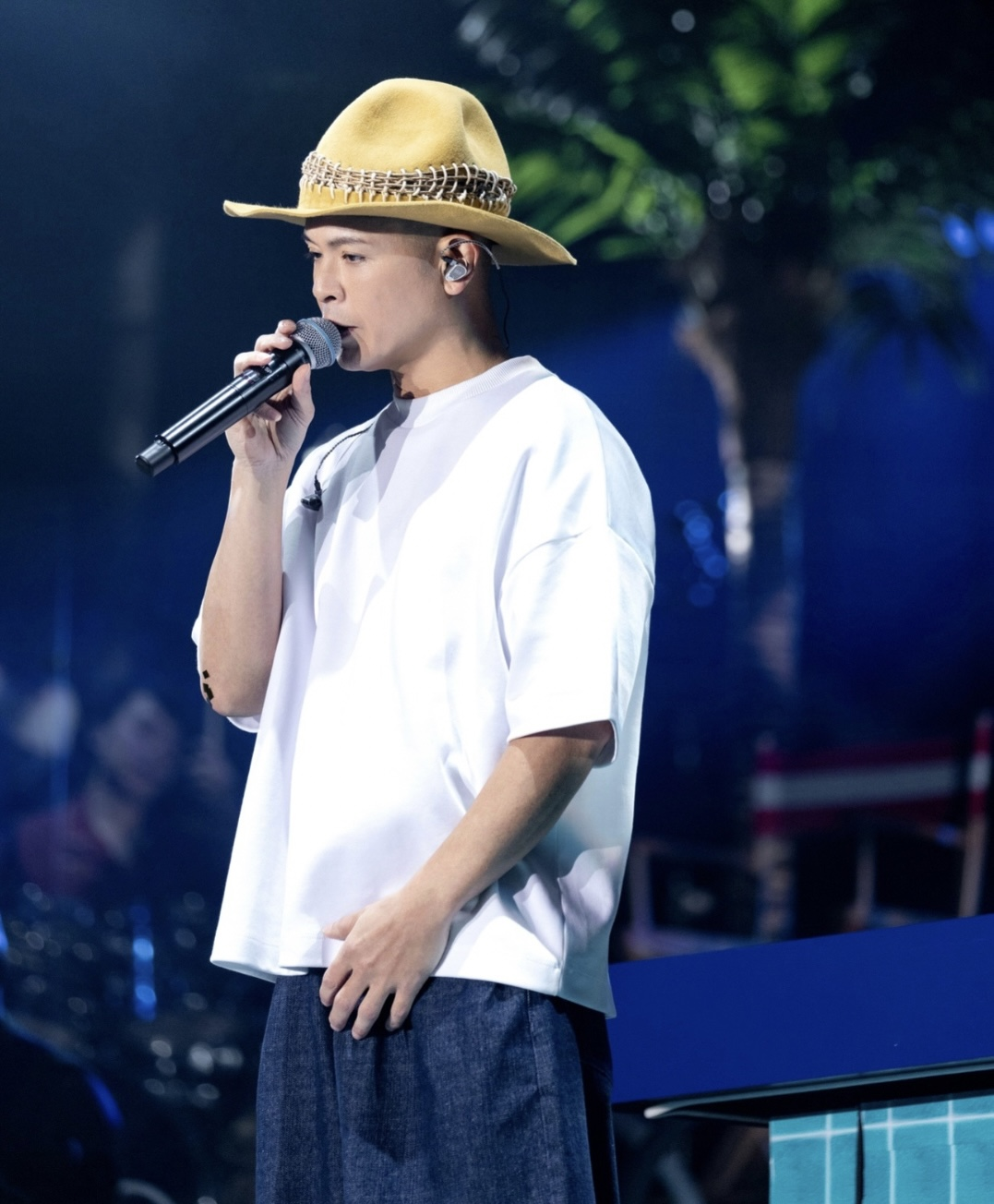
- Lo in 2025
- Born: Lo Ting Wei (羅定偉); 1 July 1976 (age 50); Syracuse, New York, United States
- Occupations: Singer-songwriter, actor
- Years active: 2005–present
- Height: 1.63 m (5 ft 4 in)

Chinese name
- Traditional Chinese: 側田
- Simplified Chinese: 侧田
Transcriptions
Standard Mandarin
- Hanyu Pinyin: Zé tían
Yue: Cantonese
- Jyutping: zak1 tin4
- Musical career
- Also known as: Jak Teen (田)
- Origin: Hong Kong
- Genres: Cantopop
- Instruments: vocals, piano, guitar, drums, beatboxing
- Label: Universal Music Hong Kong (2022–2024) S.Star Artiste Management (2016–2019) Media Asia Group (2011–2015) Gold Typhoon (2005–2011）

Justin Lo Ting Wei (Chinese: 羅定偉, born 1 July 1976), known professionally by his stage name Justin Lo (Chinese: 側田), is a Hong Kong American singer-songwriter, actor and record producer working in Hong Kong.

== Biography ==
Lo was born in Syracuse, New York, and moved to Hong Kong with his parents when he was two years old. He studied at St Paul's Co-educational Primary School and St. Paul's Co-educational College. In 1989, Lo moved to Seattle, Washington, in the United States to further his studies. He spent two years in the University of Washington and finished his degree in Graphics Design at Rhode Island School of Design in Providence, Rhode Island in 1999. After graduation, he worked as a web designer at Yahoo! in Sunnyvale, California.

Lo grew up in a family where music has always played an important role. His uncle, Ted Lo, is a famous music arranger and record producer in Hong Kong. In addition, the singer songwriter was a member in the Hong Kong Children's Choir, and he developed vast interest in music as he was growing up. In 1981, composer Joseph Koo Ka-Fai invited Justin, aged 5 at the time, and his younger sister Roxane to sing in a commercial for Barbie.

After working at Yahoo!, Lo decided to move back to Hong Kong to pursue his dream of making music.

In 2006, Lo made his feature film debut with Love @ First Note, co-starring alongside youthful singers such as Kary Ng, Alex Fong, Stephy Tang, and Theresa Fu. That same year, Lo also co-starred in 2 Become 1 opposite Miriam Yeung and Richie Ren.

== Name variations ==
Lo was born as Lo Ting Wei, and has the English name Justin. His stage name Tse Tien derives from the transliteration of his English name. He is also credited as "Justin Lo".

== Music ==
For a while Lo did some freelance design work while sending numerous demo tapes to record and label companies. In 2003, his uncle Ted Lo introduced him to Mark Lui, one of the most popular pop-composers and producers in Hong Kong. Recognizing the talent in Justin, Mark Lui signed him to his music producing company on Your Mark Ltd and Lo officially began his musical career in Hong Kong. He produced the album Day & Night for Janice (衛蘭) and wrote two songs "大雄" and "傷追人" for Leo Ku.

In 2005, he performed in an a cappella section in Ku's Solid Gold Hits Concert. His outstanding performance was validated by Mr. Paco Wong from Gold Label Music Ltd. and Wong signed him up as a singer. His plugged songs included "好人" (which was not composed by him), "Erica", "命硬" and "我有今日" (he wrote the latter two). "好人" received very positive responses. He was considered as one of the leading contenders of that year's New Male Artist Award.

His debut CD album Justin was released on 29 November 2005. Over half of the songs found in this album are written by him. It was a hit: 15,000 copies were sold on the first day. Sales reached 25,000 copies on 20 December 2005. Justin released his second album, "No Protection", on 24 March 2006, two days before his debut concert "One Good Show".

He held his debut concert in the Hong Kong Coliseum on 26 March 2006. The title of the show was "One Good Show". The tickets were sold out in just within 10 minutes on 13 February and thus two more concerts (his 2nd and 3rd concert in 2006) had to be held on 18 & 19 April 2006. In Sydney, Australia, in May 2006, he took part in a concert, accompanied by Stephy Tang, Alex Fong and Wilfred Lau at Sydney Entertainment Centre and Melbourne Arts Centre, on the 19 and 21 May 2006 respectively. The title of the concert was J.A.W.S.: each letter representing the first letter of each artist's name.

Justin held his fourth concert of 2006 in Canton, China on 1 September 2006. The title of the concert was "Watson's Distilled Water: Listen to Justin Sing", followed by another show with the same title in Hong Kong Exhibition Center (his 5th concert for 2006) on 13 Sep 2006. His sixth concert was held in Macau on 21 October 2006, One Good Show. His seventh concert in 2006 will be held in Malaysia on 24 December 2006. Title of the show is Justin Christmas Party Concert 2006, at the MIECC, The Mines in Malaysia. His seventh concert in February 2007, titled "Justin In Love With Hong Kong Philharmonic" was again in the Hong Kong Coliseum, and were sold out as well. His eighth concert was on 14 February 2007, held at Macau's Open Coliseum.

In 2007 and 2008, he performed at the S.U.C.C.E.S.S. Charity Gala at Vancouver, British Columbia, Canada with many other artists. Also, Justin went on a 3rd visit to Sydney to have another performance on 26 May 2007 at the Sydney Entertainment Centre with Theresa Fu.

Justin's third album, "JTV", was released in November 2007. Hits from this new album include "男人KTV" and "紅地氈."

From 1–7 October 2008, Justin held another concert titled "Air Justin Live 08" in Hong Kong. He released his next album, "阿田" one day prior to the first show of this concert series.

Justin held two concerts from 27 January through 28 at Hong Kong Coliseum, titled "Justin Around the World 2011". This marked his third time holding a concert at the Hong Kong Coliseum. This concert is sponsored by Philip Stein. Justin will be using a variety of styles of music, including rock, Bollywood and much more. He planned to invite musicians rather than solely singers.

In January 2011, Justin Lo officially announced that he would be leaving Hong Kong, temporarily ending his music career there and continuing his music career in Beijing. He stated that he will continue to release Cantonese albums, but will now be based in Beijing rather than Hong Kong. Once in Beijing, Justin also released his first Mandarin songs, including "很想很想說再見" and "風從哪裡來", in which the former was highly praised as one of his best works.

In 2014, Justin moved back to Hong Kong to resume his music career.

In 2021, Justin released two new songs, which called Light and You Are Full Of Vitality respectively.

== Discography ==
- 29 November 2005 – Justin (Debut Studio Album)
- 24 March 2006 – No Protection (Second studio album)
- 5 July 2006 – No Protection (Dual Disc Version)
- 16 March 2007 – 港樂X側田In Love with the Philharmonic Live CD (Concert)
- 13 April 2007 – 港樂X側田In Love with the Philharmonic Live CD + Karaoke DVD (Concert)
- 16 November 2007 – JTV (Third Studio Album)
- 30 September 2008 – A Tian (阿田) (Fourth Studio Album)
- 5 December 2008 – Air Justin 08 Live (Concert) (2CD & DVD)
- 27 February 2009 – From JUSTIN - Collection of His First 3 Years (2CD + Karaoke DVD))
- 22 June 2010 – I Never Changed Love Addiction (我沒有變過 愛的習慣) (Fifth Studio Album)
- 15 May 2011 – 3 Months (三个月) (Single)
- 29 April 2011 – Justin Around The World 2011 (Concert) (Live + Karaoke 2DVD+2CD) (Blu-ray released on 10 June 2011)
- 19 October 2012 – Gold Typhoon 10th Anniversary Series - Justin Lo (2 CD)
- 22 May 2013 – Tough Battle (硬仗)(Digital EP)
- 28 August 2013 – Tough Battle (硬仗) (Sixth studio album)
- 12 December 2014 – Gold Typhoon Best Sellers Series - Justin Lo (2 CD)
- 5 June 2015 – Never Odd or Even (CD + DVD) (Seventh studio album)
- 4 September 2015 – Justin WeTouch Live 2015 (Concert)(2DVD + Karaoke DVD + 2CD) (Blu-ray released on 16 October 2015)
- 26 October 2017 - The Drug Called Music (Eighth studio album)
- 13 April 2022 - Love Songs From Dreams (Digital album)
- 13 June 2022 - Love Songs From Dreams (Ninth studio album)
- 26 January 2023 - Justin The First Moment Live Concert (BD + CD)

== Filmography ==
=== Films ===
- Lan Kwai Fong - 3 (2013)
- 72 Tenants of Prosperity (2010)
- Love/Nothing to Hide (Micro-Film)(2010)
- Love Connected (2009)
- Love @ First Note (2006)
- 2 Become 1 (2006)

=== Television shows ===
ViuTV

- Goodnight Show - King Maker (2018) - vocal trainer
