= Big Four (band) =

Hong Kong music group

- Origin: Hong Kong
- Genres: Cantopop
- Years active: 2009–present
- Label: Gold Typhoon
- Members: Dicky Cheung; Andy Hui; William So; Edmond Leung

The Big Four is an all-male Hong Kong musical group formed by Dicky Cheung, Andy Hui, William So, and Edmond Leung in 2009.They released their first self-titled single in 2009, in which the single topped most of Hong Kong's music charts. Their next single, "Unable to Love" (愛莫能助) in 2010, was also topped charts and received consistent airplay for many weeks.

The Big Four held their first concert, The Big Four World Tour, for five days in the Hong Kong Coliseum from 11 to 15 March 2010.

In 2013, the Big Four held their second concert, The Big Four World Tour Live, for six days in the Hong Kong Coliseum from 9 to 14 February.

The first television program hosted by them and named as "Big Four大四喜" was also released in May 2010.

== The Big Hits Big Four (2010) ==
1. Big Four - Big Four
2. 愛莫能助 ("Unable to Help") - Big Four
3. 男人最痛 ("Man's Most Painful") - Andy Hui
4. 紅顏知己 ("Confidante") - William So
5. 七友 ("Seven Friends") - Edmond Leung
6. 你愛我像誰 ("Who Do You Love Me As") - Dicky Cheung
7. 男人不該讓女人流淚 ("Men Should Not Make Women Cry") - William So
8. 纏綿遊戲 ("Touchy Game") - Edmond Leung
9. 誰是個小丑 ("Who is the Clown") - Dicky Cheung
10. 你傷風我感冒 ("You Catch a Cold, I Catch the Flu") - Andy Hui
11. 傷了三個心 ("Have Hurt Three Hearts")- Edmond Leung
12. 身體健康 ("Healthy Body") - Dicky Cheung
13. 戀愛片段 ("A Strip of Loving") - Andy Hui
14. 黑色禮服 ("Formal Blackwear") - Wiliam So
15. 傾心傾意傾神 ("Heart, Attention, God") - Dicky Cheung
16. 爛泥 ("Mud") - Andy Hui
17. 來夜方長 ("A Long Time") - William So (featuring Kit Chan)
18. 艦隊 ("Fleet") - Edmond Leung

== Music charts ==
Year	Album	Song	TVB	903	RTHK	997
2009	The Big Hits Big Four	"Big Four"	1	1	3	1
2010	The Big Hits Big Four	"愛莫能助" (Unable to Help)	1	2	1	2
