= Cookies (Hong Kong band) =

Hong Kong band

- Born: Hong Kong
- Years active: 2002–2006(de facto disbanded)
- Musical career
- Also known as: Mini Cookies (2003–2004)
- Origin: Hong Kong
- Genre: Cantopop
- Label: EMI Hong Kong
- Past members: Full tenure Stephy Tang, Kary Ng, Theresa Fu, Miki Yeung 2002–2003; Angela Au, Gloria Chan, Elaine Ho, Helena Ma, Serena Po

Cookies were a music group in Hong Kong created by Chan Chi Kwong under the giant record label EMI Hong Kong and later managed by Paco Wong of then Gold Label Entertainment (now known as Gold Typhoon).

== History ==
The group was formed with nine members in 2002 and was considered an emulation of the Japanese group Morning Musume.That same year the group released their debut album Happy Birthday. This helped the group become one of the best selling new groups of 2002 in Hong Kong. However, in 2003, the management contract of Cookies was passed over to Gold Label Entertainment. Once Paco Wong took over the management of Cookies, he made the decision to reduce the number of group members to four. The successfully remaining members were announced on 27 April 2003, and the four members consisted of Stephy Tang, Kary Ng, Theresa Fu, and Miki Yeung (most often referred by the media of Hong Kong as Mini Cookies); on the same day, the debut song of Mini Cookies, 「貪你可愛」, was released. Their albums, however, continued to be released under the Cookies name.

Cookies is now considered to be disbanded. Elaine Ho, Gloria Chan, Helena Ma, and Serena Po had left the entertainment industry when the original nine-member group was downsized to four members in 2003. Angela Au went on to become a DJ of Radio Television Hong Kong. Mini Cookies would continue to be active for two years, 2003–2005, until they were arranged to develop solo careers.

On 28 March 2005, the members announced at the autograph session of their 4 in Love album that they had decided to explore solo careers. Although the four members had, at the time, firmly claimed that they were not disbanding, and to date, no official statement of disbandment has been released, the four members have, in reality, rarely collaborated under the name of Cookies ever since they began expanding their respective solo careers.

In 2009, Miki Yeung and Theresa Fu had both decided not to renew with Gold Label Entertainment when their respective management contracts expired. Two years later, in 2011, Kary Ng and Stephy Tang's management contracts had also respectively ended; Ng signed with Cinepoly Records while Tang signed with Hai Run Movies & TV Production Co., Ltd.in the same year. From 2011 onward, none of the members from Cookies were signed with Gold Typhoon, nor under the same management company as one another.

On 11 August 2010, Angela Au, Elaine Ho, Gloria Chan, and Helena Ma, from the nine-member Cookies, held a concert titled 曲奇Happy2gether音樂會 at Kowloonbay International Trade & Exhibition Centre. Kary Ng and Miki Yeung, as well as Serena Po, attended as audience members. Au, Ho, Chan, and Ma released a track titled 「拍擋」as the theme song of their mini concert.

On 3 August 2012, Cookies, with the exception of Theresa Fu and Serena Po, appeared as a guest performer at Shine's concert, Shine Again 2012, which was held at Kowloonbay International Trade & Exhibition Centre. The group performed their debut song 「心急人上」. The appearance of Cookies proved to be nostalgic, as Cookies and Shine had debuted near the same time. Stephy Tang expressed that Theresa Fu was unable to attend because she was filming for a TV drama in Taiwan while Serena Po could not attend, for she was residing in Canada and pregnant at the time. This appearance is closest of having a reunion of the original nine-member Cookies group to date.

On 9 January 2013, Kary Ng held the second show of her second Hong Kong Coliseum concert, The Present Concert 2013, and during the encore portion, Stephy Tang, Miki Yeung, and Angela Au appeared as surprise guests. They had performed the debut song of Cookies, 「心急人上」. Tang had expressed that she had just returned to Hong Kong the morning of that concert night while Au revealed on-stage that the surprise appearance by the three girls was originally the idea of Ng's mother.

== Members ==
=== Mini Cookies ===
- Stephy Tang (鄧麗欣, Leader):

Tang had been a part-time model before officially joining the entertainment industry. She was referred to EMI Hong Kong by the model agency Talent Bang, which subsequently resulted in her joining of Cookies. She had been the leader of the nine-member group. Tang is the first member of Cookies to have released a solo album; at the beginning of her solo career development, she focused on music. In 2007, she held her first solo concert at Kowloonbay International Trade & Exhibition Centre, making her the first Cookies member to have ever held a solo concert. When her contract ended with Gold Typhoon in 2011, she signed a management contract with Hai Run Movies & TV Production Co., Ltd. and had then officially begun to develop her career in Mainland China. She currently focuses on filming Mainland TV dramas and films in her career. In 2013, Tang announced that she has signed with Sun Entertainment Culture Ltd, leading her to once again work with her previous manager when she was with Cookies, Paco Wong. In the same year, Tang released a Cantonese single, 「踏·空」.

- Theresa Fu (傅穎)

Fu had previously been a part-time model before officially entering the entertainment industry. Like Tang, she was also referred to EMI Hong Kong by the model agency Talent Bang. Fu is the third member of Cookies to have released a solo album. At the beginning of her solo career development, she focused on filming commercials and films; she eventually turned her focus back to music in 2007. In 2009, her contracted ended with Gold Typhoon. In the same year, Fu had signed a management contract with Filmko. However, Fu's career became wary in 2011 when she publicly accused her then-boyfriend from the same management company, Him Law, of physically abusing her; Filmko responded by cancelling all of Fu's scheduled jobs, and she subsequently disappeared from the Hong Kong entertainment industry. Fu eventually picked up again through turning her focus to the Mainland market. In 2013, when presumably her management contract with Filmko ended, she signed with Darton Entertainment, and the management company is responsible for her career development in Taiwan. She has since concentrated on filming TV dramas and films.

- Miki Yeung (楊愛瑾)

Like Fu and Tang, Yeung had previously been a part-time model before officially joining the entertainment industry. She was referred to EMI Hong Kong by model agency, Starz People, which led to her joining Cookies. After beginning her solo career development, she had given her complete focus to films. In 2009, her contract with Gold Typhoon ended, and she opted to sign with Starz People once again. From then, she focused on modelling jobs, as well as commercial appearances. In 2012, she signed a per-series contract with TVB, and she had begun acting in TVB dramas, as well as hosting TVB programs. In 2013, Yeung released her debut solo song since the disbanding of Cookies; the track was titled 「綿羊」.

- Kary Ng (吳雨霏, previously known as 吳家穎)

Ng had entered a singing competition held by Commercial Radio Hong Kong (903 Clean and Clear手牽手大行動) before officially entering the entertainment industry. Due to her singing performance during the competition, she was recognised and approached by EMI Hong Kong, which led to her subsequently joining Cookies. She currently holds the record of being the youngest recipient of a CRHK award ever, as she was only 16 years old when Cookies received the "Best Group Newcomer – Bronze Award" in 2002. In 2004, she had become the lead vocals of rock band Ping Pung, thus making her the only Cookies member that held an active status in two bands simultaneously; Ping Pung, however, disbanded after only releasing one album, as Ng went on to develop her solo career. After beginning her solo career development, Ng focused on her music career. In 2011, her contract with Gold Typhoon had ended, and she subsequently signed a new contract with Cinepoly Records. Ng is, to date, the only Cookies member who is still consistently active in music industry; she is the first, and so far, only member to have held solo concerts in the Hong Kong Coliseum, and she is also the first, and so far, only Cookies member to have gone on to win reputable music awards in Hong Kong, such as the "Best Female Singer – Bronze Award" from the CRHK Music Awards.

=== Cookies ===
- Stephy Tang (鄧麗欣, Leader)
- Theresa Fu (傅穎)
- Miki Yeung (楊愛瑾)
- Kary Ng (吳雨霏, previously known as 吳家穎)
- Angela Au (區文詩)

Au is now a DJ for Radio Television Hong Kong. She signed a record deal with MusicNEXT in 2010; that same year, she released her first solo EP album, Angelicious, and her second EP album was released in February 2012, titled Angela區文詩.

- Elaine Ho (何綺玲)

Ho was born in Macau and was the only Cookies member who came from Macau; she left the entertainment industry and returned home to complete her studies when Cookies were reduced to four members in 2003. Ho had gotten married on 19 March 2014; Stephy Tang, Kary Ng, Miki Yeung, and Angela Au were spotted to be in attendance of Ho's wedding. Au expressed on Ho's behalf that all the Cookies members who are in Hong Kong at the time will also be attending. However, when asked if she had been invited to Ho's wedding, Theresa Fu expressed that she had not been invited, but still wishes blessings to Ho's marriage.

- Gloria Chan (陳素瑩)

Chan had left the entertainment industry after the downsizing of Cookies to Mini Cookies in 2003. She went on to study finance and accounting at Manchester Business School afterwards and eventually earned a master's degree. She now works as an auditor at one of the Big Four firms.

- Helena Ma (馬思恆)

Ma left the entertainment industry after Cookies were downsized to Mini Cookies in 2003. She went on to study Art Therapy in America and earned a Doctoral Degree. She currently resides in the United States.

- Serena Po (蒲茜兒)

Po had left the entertainment industry after the reduction of Cookies to Mini Cookies in 2003. She is now married and has given birth to a daughter. She currently resides in Canada.

== Discography ==
=== Cantonese albums ===
1. Happy Birthday (2002)
2. Merry Christmas (2002)
3. All The Best (2003) – first album as Mini-Cookies
4. 4 Play (2004)
5. 4 in Love (2004)

=== Karaoke albums ===
1. Holidays(2002)
2. Channel Cookies (2003)

=== Mini concert albums ===
- 903 California Red: Eleven Fires Concert (2004)

== Filmography ==
- Nine Girls and A Ghost (九個女仔一隻鬼, 2002)

=== Television series ===
- Aqua Heroes (戀愛自由式) – Starring: Stephy Tang, Theresa Fu
- Heart of Fencing (當四葉草碰上劍尖時) – As Guest
- Not Just a Pretty Face (美麗在望) – As Guest

=== Web drama ===
- Blue Can (now.com) 藍罐最痛
- 4 Cookies Mystery (now.com) 四曲奇談
- 100% Feel – Winter's Love (now.com) 百份百感覺-冬日之戀

== Awards ==
=== 2002 ===
Award	Category	Work	Result	Ref
997 Metro Show 新城勁爆	Best New Group 新登場組合		Silver Award	
Ultimate Song Chart Awards Presentation 叱吒樂壇	Best New Group 新力軍組合		Bronze Award	
IFPI Awards	Best Sales for New Group Singers 全年最高銷量新組合		Won	
TVB JSG Third Quarter Awards 勁歌金曲第三季季選	New Artists 新星試打三屆台主	Impatient Person (心急人上)	Won	
TVB JSG Annual Awards 十大勁歌金曲	The Most Favorite New Group		Bronze Award	
RTHK Top 10 Gold Songs Awards 十大中文金曲	Best New Potential Group 最有前途新人組合		Silver Award	

=== 2003 ===
Award	Category	Work	Result	Ref
TVB Kids Songs Fair 兒歌金曲開心嘉年華		Forever Friends	Bronze Award	
TVB JSG Third Quarter Awards 勁歌金曲第三季季選	The Most Favourite Internet/Cellphone Female Singers 手機網絡人氣女歌手		Won	
997 Metro Show 新城勁爆	Best Group 人氣組合		Won	
Roadshow MV Awards; Roadshow MV 直選	Best MV	Best Shot (一擊即中)	Won	
TVB JSG Annual Awards 十大勁歌金曲	The Most Favourite Advertisement Song 最受歡迎廣告歌曲大獎	貪你可愛	Silver Award	
