= Gold Typhoon =

Chinese entertainment company

Gold Typhoon Entertainment Limited
- Type: Private
- Industry: Music, Artist management
- Founded: 2004 (Gold Label Entertainment); 2008 (Gold Typhoon Entertainment)
- Headquarters: Beijing, China
- Area served: Greater China
- Key people: Chiara Scaglia, Group CEO, CEO (China); Desmond Lee, Group COO, CEO (Hong Kong); Tony Hwang, General Manager (Taiwan)
- Number of employees: 150+
- Parent: Warner Music Group
- Subsidiaries: Gold Typhoon Pictures Ltd; Gold Typhoon Music Co.Ltd; Gold Typhoon Beijing Ltd; Famous Star Entertainment Berhad
- Website: Gold Typhoon official website

Gold Typhoon Group is a Chinese entertainment company founded in Hong Kong as Gold Label in 2004 with the support of EMI. It acquired EMI Music Taiwan / EMI Music China (Typhoon Records) in 2008 to adopt its current name. On 1 January 2011, it became a wholly owned subsidiary of Pacific Global Management Asia (PGMA) under the leadership of Chairman Louis Pong. The company was acquired by Warner Music Group in April 2014.

Gold Typhoon represents many Chinese and international artists, and has offices in Beijing, Shanghai, Guangzhou, Chengdu, Taipei and Hong Kong. In 2004, former Go East Entertainment CEO Paco Wong decided to not work with the parent company of Go East, Universal Group Hong Kong, but to instead work for EMI Hong Kong as they promised to launch a new label. Paco Wong was to have total control of the new label which became Gold Label Entertainment.

== History ==
In 2004, former Go East Entertainment CEO Paco Wong decided to not work with the parent company of Go East, Universal Group Hong Kong, but to instead work for EMI Hong Kong as they promised to launch a new label. Paco Wong was to have total control of the new label which became Gold Label Entertainment.

All products of Gold Label Entertainment share the same ISRC and bar-code system with EMI which include, "07243-", "00946-" and newly released "50999-". Gold Label under EMI has released the first DRM-free music downloading agreement with Hong Kong's local mobile brand CSL mobile. In addition to marketing and distribution, the company is also involved in artist and concert management.

EMI Music Hong Kong decided to delegate its local activities to Gold Label, leaving EMI to concentrate on international artists. Gold Label has also taken over EMI Hong Kong's local artists roster, which includes Kary Ng, Stephy Tang, Cookies, Ping Pung, Edmond Leung. With the launch of Capitol Music Taiwan by EMI, Gold Label is now working to market Taiwanese diva Jolin Tsai in Hong Kong. The label has signed local singers Miriam Yeung and Sandy Lam. Together, with re-shaping local stars Ronald Cheng, Leo Ku and Edmond Leung, Gold Label is now one of the largest music companies in Hong Kong.

The company also promotes new artists. Justin Lo, a singer-songwriter from the United States, won all new artist's awards in Hong Kong in 2005 by having the top-10 best selling records in Hong Kong 2005.

In the circulated materials such as the Red Bus Airplay Calculation, Gold Label Entertainment is still referred as EMI.

In July 2008, EMI Group and Gold Label announced EMI would sell all its 50% stakes at Gold Label Entertainment Ltd., Push Typhoon Records and the whole EMI Music Taiwan to Typhoon Group. And Gold Label Records and Gold Label Entertainment would change its name to Gold Typhoon with branches in the Greater China region. Also, EMI would appoint Gold Typhoon as its only distributing partners in the region. Conversely, Gold Typhoon would release through EMI internationally.

On 1 January 2011, Gold Typhoon Group became a wholly owned subsidiary of Pacific Global Management.

It was acquired by Warner Music Group in April 2014.

== Music ==
Gold Typhoon Group is the exclusive licensee of EMI's physical and digital music in China and Taiwan. Gold Typhoon also releases albums from European and American, Korean and Japanese artists. Gold Typhoon's catalogue contains more than 600,000 Chinese and international songs. As one of the biggest record labels and artist management companies in greater China, Gold Typhoon represents more than 50 Chinese pop artists, including Taiwan artists A-Mei, Show Lo, Elva Hsiao, Lollipop F, Jing Chang; mainland China artists Xu Wei, Li Jian, Zhang Wei, Fu Xinbo, Peiyi Yang and Hong Kong artist Ronald Cheng, Wu Jing, Edmond Leung, Rubberband, Louis Cheung and so forth.

Gold Typhoon also acts as an agent for international artists, and provides distribution and marketing in greater China for artists including Coldplay, Katy Perry, Kylie Minogue, Robbie Williams, Lady Antebellum, David Guetta, Maksim, Michael Learns To Rock; Japanese artists including Hikaru Utada, AKB48, Glay, Miyavi, Nana Mizuki; Korean idol Jang Keun-Suk, After School; and classical musicians Yundi Li, Xuefei Yang, Sarah Chang and Niu Niu.

== Sponsor and brand ambassador ==
Gold Typhoon has partnerships with many well-known Chinese and international brands. Gold Typhoon's business development department arranges brand ambassadorships for its artists, such as Yundi Li (Zegna), David Tao and A-Mei (Masterkong Ice Tea), Fahrenheit (Masterkong 3+2), David Tao and S.H.E (Daphne), Li Jian and Anson Hu (Nokia), and Bibi Zhou (Bossini, Aoni Stereo).

Brands sponsored shows for Gold Typhoon Artists include: Show Lo's live performance in Hong Kong sponsored by SaSa, Pepsi Coke and Fortress; Chow Tai Fook Jewellery sponsored Stephy Tang's concert; Rubberband received supports from Samsung and Volkswagen sponsored Big Four's tour.

Other business partners include Hutchison Telecom Hong Kong, Chivas, Chung Yuen Hong Kong, Shiseido, Levis, EPS, Giorano and so forth.

== Artist Management ==
Gold Label was started as a small artist management agency. Paco Wong was named the "Golden Agent" in Hong Kong as he helped many once unsuccessful artists build up their careers, including Jacky Cheung, Andy Lau, Aaron Kwok, Sammi Cheng, Miriam Yeung, Sally Yeh, Sandy Lam, and Leo Ku. Generally speaking, rosters from Gold Label Management are signed to its music department when artists start their singing career. Before EMI Music Hong Kong delegated local artist activities to Gold Label Entertainment, Gold Label Management was already home of EMI's rosters, including Edmond Leung and The Cookies.

Now Gold Typhoon Group is the artist manager of many artists like Xu Wei, Li Jian in Mainland, Lollipop F in Taiwan, Terry Zou, AOA and other artists in Hong Kong. Gold Typhoon also shared the rights to manage other artists like A-mei, Elva Hsiao, Show Lo etc.

== Concert production ==
In 2004, Gold Label began concert production. The first concert produced was Miriam Yeung's KungHiFatChoi Concert Vol. 3 in February 2004 in association with East Asia Entertainment, Abbas Entertainment Hong Kong and Yiu Wing Entertainment. After gaining experience through independent concerts, they are now producing for their own rosters by outsourcing to other entertainment firms and production houses. Other concert productions include Edmond Leung's I love Kitchen Concert, Jolin Tsai's Dancing Forever World Tour in Hong Kong, Leo Ku's Magic Moments Live 2007, Stephy Tang's See Thru Concert 2007 and Kary Ng's Lady K Concert 2008.

Gold Typhoon has an experienced live performance production team which has held and helped arrange performances in recent years for artists including David Tao, Show Lo, A-Mei, Elva Hsiao, Bibi Zhou, Yundi, Xu Wei, Li Jian, Ronald Cheng, The Flowers/Zhang Wei, Rubberband, Michael Learns To Rock, Maksim, and Niu Niu.

== Artist rosters ==
=== Hong Kong ===
- Abella Leung (梁佑嘉) (singer)
- AOA (singer)
- goldEN (singer/songwriter)
- Kay Tse (謝安琪) (singer)
- Khalil Fong (方大同)(singer/songwriter)
- Louis Cheung (張繼聰) (singer)
- Nick Ngai (倪力)(singer/songwriter)
- Terry Zou (鄒文正) (singer)

=== Mainland China ===
- Ethan Liang (梁閎) (DJ/singer/songwriter)
- GT Star
- Han Xue (韓雪)
- Hu Ge (胡歌)
- Jeff Kung (孔令奇)
- Qin Lan (秦嵐)
- Wu Jing (吳京) (actor)
- Yang Peiyi (楊沛宜)

=== Philippines ===
- Charlie Green (查理格林)

=== Taiwan ===
- Johnny Chen (陳煥昌 / 小蟲)
- Lollipop F (formerly Lollipop 棒棒堂) - renamed in October 2010
- Shinlung (辛龍)
- Yan Fan (陽帆)
- Yang Siou-Huei (楊繡惠)

=== South Korea ===
- After School (band)
- IU (singer)
- Orange caramel (After School Sub Unit)
- Son Dam-bi

=== Singapore ===
- Derrick Hoh (何維健)

=== Japan ===
- AKB48
- Atsuko Maeda
- Eri Kitamura
- Glay
- Inori Minase
- Kana Uemura
- Kreva (rapper)
- Mamoru Miyano
- Miyavi
- Momoiro Clover Z
- Nana Mizuki
- Shouta Aoi
- Taro Hakase
- Tokyo Jihen
- Yo Hitoto
- Yukie Nishimura

=== International artists ===
- Evanescence

=== Classical artists ===
- Niu Niu (牛牛)
- Yang Xuefei (楊雪霏)
- 陳軍

=== Previous artists ===
- Alex Fong (方力申) (singer/actor) (2000-2011)
- Alex Lee (李崗霖)(Virgin Music Taiwan)
- Awaking Band (元衛覺醒) (Capitol Music Taiwan) (2007–2008)
- Big Four (pop group)
- Celina Jade (Actress/singer)
- Chelsea Tong (唐素琪) (actress) (2007-2009)
- Cookies (singing group, disbanded)
- Cyndi Wang (王心凌) now in Universal
- A-mei (張惠妹) now in EMI/Universal
- Julia Peng (彭佳慧) now in Sony Music
- Feng Fei-fei (鳳飛飛) (Died on January 3, 2012)
- I Love U Boy'z (CRHK DJ/TV personality) (signed in Jan, 2009)
- Jan Lamb (林海峰) (singer/actor/CRHK DJ)
- Jolin Tsai (蔡依林) (Capitol Music Taiwan) (2005–2008)
- Justin Lo (側田) (singer/actor/songwriter) (2005-2010)
- Kary Ng (吳雨霏) (singer/actress) (2002-2011)
- Khloe Chu (朱紫嬈) (singer)
- Leo Ku (古巨基) (singer/actor) (2003–2009)
- Miki Yeung (楊愛瑾) (singer/actress)
- Miriam Yeung (楊千嬅) (singer/actress) (2003–2006)
- Nicholas Teo (張棟樑) (Virgin Music Taiwan) (2005–2008)
- Penny Dai (戴佩妮)(EMI Music Taiwan)
- Ping Pung (punk and pop rock group)
- Richie Ren (任賢齊) (EMI Music Taiwan) (2005–2008)
- Sammy Leung (森美) (CRHK DJ/TVB artist)
- Sandy Lam (林憶蓮) (singer)
- Seven (YG Entertainment Korea)
- SoftHard (pop group)
- Stanley Huang (黃立行) (Capitol Music Taiwan) (2006–2008)
- Stefanie Sun (孫燕姿)
- Stephy Tang (鄧麗欣) (singer/actress/author) (2002-2011)
- Theresa Fu (傅穎)
- William So (蘇永康)

=== EMI Catalogue ===
- Thirty Seconds to Mars 30秒上火星
- Lenny Kravitz 藍尼克羅維茲
- A Fine Frenzy 美麗瞬間
- Leon Jay Williams 立威廉
- A Place To Bury Strangers 亂葬崗樂團
- Leon Russell 里昂羅素
- A.K. A.K. (Atomic Kitten)
- Les Petits Chanteurs De Saint 聖馬克教堂兒童合唱團
- About Group 關於我們
- LeToya 樂朵雅
- Adam Faith 亞當費斯
- Levon Helm 李翁赫姆
- Adam Tensta 亞當坦斯達
- Liars 騙徒樂團
- Adem 亞當樂團
- Lightships 燈船樂團
- Adrian Sherwood 亞卓安雪伍
- Lightspeed Champion 光速玩家
- Air 空氣
- 里菈當斯 *Lila Downs
- 飛航管制樂團 *Air Traffic
- 莉莉艾倫 *Lily Allen
- 艾爾史都華 *Al Stewart
- 林迪斯芳樂團 *Lindisfarne
- 艾倫蘇松*Alain Souchon
- 流動液態合唱團*Liquid Liquid
- 亞倫班奈，彼得庫克，喬納森米勒和杜德利摩爾 Alan Bennett, Peter Cook, Jona
- 調皮賈姬 Little Jackie
- 呼叫樂團之艾利克斯 Alex Band
- 臨場感樂團 Live
- 北極潑猴之艾力克斯 Alex Turner
- 麗茲費兒 Liz Phair
- 亞歷山大 Alexander Pries
- 麗莎曼妮 Liza Manili
- 艾爾菲樂團 ALFIE
- 麗莎明妮莉 Liza Minnelli
- 愛麗絲 Alice
- 蘿恩 Loane
- 束縛艾利斯 Alice In Chains
- 親親隆尼 Loney, Dear
- 聖女合唱團 All Saints
- 灰狼一族合唱團 Los Lobos
- 合而為一 ALL-4-ONE
- 陸巴洛 Lou Barlow
- 幻化結構樂團 Alter Bridge
- 路易斯普萊瑪 Louis Prima
- 阿莉和阿J Aly&AJ * 愛是唯一樂團 Love Is All
- 雌雄同體 AMORPHOUS ANDROGYNOUS
- 愛戀樂團 Lovex
- 安柏林樂團 ANBERLIN
- 菁英份子 LOW MILLIONS
- 安迪貝爾 Andy Bell
- 露仙妮鮑耶 Lucienne Boyer
- 安琪哈特 Angie Hart
- 露西妮黛伊樂 Lucienne Delyle
- 動物共同體樂團 Animal Collective
- 路克布萊恩 Luke Bryan
- 恩雅亞柏瑞克 ANJA GARBAREK
- 茹絲卡薩爾 Luz Casal
- 安娜卡維 Anna Calvi
- 小麥：麥特波柯拉 M. Pokora
- 安妮克拉克 Anne Clark
- 天生玩家樂團 M.V.P.
- 安瑪莉 Anne Murray
- M83
- 世外桃源 Arcadia
- 馬卡寇樂團 Macaco
- 阿奇布朗森軍團 Archie Bronson Outfit
- K小姐 Mademoiselle K
- 北極潑猴 Arctic Monkeys
- 瘋子樂團 Madness
- 阿里斯蒂德布里昂 Aristide Bruant
- 聖母合唱團 MADREDEUS
- 阿諾 Arno
- 麥佐迦達樂團 Madrugada
- 澀藝術樂團 ART BRUT
- 雜誌樂團 Magazine
- 亞洲音效轉錄機構 ASIAN DUB FOUNDATION
- 神力系統 Magic System
- 運動失調症（嗆辣紅椒之約翰伏許安） Ataxia
- 天使 Malachai
- 體育健將樂團 Athlete
- 曼朵戴歐樂團 Mando Diao
- 光明女神 Austra
- 黑手黨 Mano Negra
- 阿凡 Avant
- 曼森 Mansun
- 紅色艾希爾 Axelle Red
- 面孔 Maps
- 步履蹣跚樂團 Babyshambles
- 馬克安東 Marc Antoin
- 塗鴉男孩 Badly Drawn Boy
- 馬克穆林 Marc Moulin
- 巴哈人 Baha Men
- 瑪西遊樂園 Marcy Playground
- 巴特摩拉 Baltimora
- 瑪莉笛比 Marie Digby
- BJH樂團 Barclay James Harvest
- 海獅合唱團 Marillion
- 裸體淑女 Barenaked Ladies
- 瑪麗莎蒙特 Marisa Monte
- 貝瑞亞當森 Barry Adamson
- 「窈窕美眉」瑪莉特 Marit Larsen
- 棒棒仙女 Bat For Lashes
- 瑪麗莎 Mariza
- 巴克斯特狄爾瑞 Baxter Dury
- 馬可休斯頓 Marques Houston
- BBC無線電音樂工場 BBC Radiophonic Workshop
- 馬蒂史都華 Marty Stuart
- 華麗爵士樂團 BE Bop Deluxe
- 瑪麗霍普金斯 Mary Hopkin
- 野獸男孩 Beastie Boys
- 強烈衝擊 Massive Attack
- 貝貝 Bebe
- 黑幫教父P Master P
- 陛尼曼 Beenie Man

* 馬地雅巴沙樂團 Matia Bazar

- 貝琳達 Belinda
- 麥特蒙洛 Matt Monro
- 貝琳達卡萊兒 Belinda Carlisle
- 麥特納森 Matt Nathanson
- 班哈伯 Ben Harper
- 萬事OK樂團 MATTAFIX
- 班哈伯與絕情樂團 Ben Harper And Relentless 7
- 馬提亞斯海恩 Matthias Reim
- 班哈伯與天真罪犯樂團 Ben Harper And The Innocent Cr
- 馬堤亞多納 Mattia Donna
- 班哲明弼歐雷 Benjamin Biolay
- 墨利斯雪佛萊 Maurice Chevalier
- 賓居費瑞 Benjy Ferree
- 麥克斯波艾斯 Max Boyce
- 弼尼曼 BENNIE MAN
- 冰封凍原 Max Tundra
- 伯特詹茨 Bert Jansch
- 麥斯米蘭 Maximilian Hecker
- 貝詩歐頓 Beth Orton
- 迷宮樂團與法藍基比佛利 Maze Featuring Frankie Beverly
- 碧薇莉奈特 Beverley Knight
- 有志一同 Me And My Army
- 大人物 BIG BOI
- 肉塊 Meat Loaf
- 珊瑚樂團之比爾瓊斯 Bill Ryder-Jones
- 麥加帝斯 Megadeth
- 比利艾鐸 Billy Idol
- 媚兒喜 Mel C
- 比利普瑞斯登 Billy Preston
- 梅格海洛 Merle Haggard
- 比利史奎爾 Billy Squier
- 麥可法藍堤與先鋒樂團 Michael Franti & Spearhead
- 黑色骰子樂團 Black Dice
- 搖滾麥克 Michael Learns To Rock
- 黑色草原 Black Prairie
- 麥可尼曼 Michael Nyman
- 黑色安息日 Black Sabbath
- 米克哈維 MICK HARVEY
- 白色樂團 BLANC
- 三維麥基 Mickey 3D
- 瞽目守護神樂團 Blind Guardian
- 米茲尤瑞 Midge Ure
- 金髮美女合唱團 Blondie
- 午夜巨神 Midnight Juggernauts
- 血橙 Blood Orange
- 邁可布蘭特 Mike Brant
- BLUE
- 救世主 MIMS
- 布勒合唱團 Blur
- 米娜 Mina
- 巴布席格與銀彈合唱團 Bob Seger & The Silver Bullet
- 明蒂史密斯 Mindy Smith
- 鮑比維 Bobby Vee
- 小貓小姐 MISS KITTEN
- 空殼樂團 BODIES WITHOUT ORGANS (BWO)
- 蜜絲婷瑰 Mistinguett
- 小兔子王子比利 Bonnie 'Prince' Billy
- 魔比 Moby
- 邦妮芮特 BONNIE RAITT
- 蒙提卡查察 Monte Cazazza
- 柏拉許樂團 Bratsch
- 晨跑樂團 Morning Parade
- 布朗德雷諾斯樂團 Braund Reynolds
- 晨跑健將樂團 Morning Runner
- 瘋狂班哲明樂團 Breaking Benjamin
- 晨木樂團 Morningwood
- BREAKS合作社 BREAKS CO-OP
- 莫里西 Morrissey
- 布萊恩伊諾 Brian Eno
- 原動力樂團 Motor
- 布萊恩威爾森 Brian Wilson
- 泡泡T. DJ Mousse T. vs The Dandy Warhols
- B.E.F. British Electric Foundation
- M M
- 布魯斯福賽斯 Bruce Forsyth
- 永生樂團 N.E.R.D.
- 布魯諾寇萊 BRUNO COULAIS
- N.W.A
- 布萊恩費瑞 Bryan Ferry
- 納京高 Nat King Cole
- 疤 霸 Bubba Sparxxx
- 尼克13 Nick 13
- 吵鬧公雞樂團 Buzzcocks
- 尼克凱夫與壞種子樂團 Nick Cave & The Bad Seeds
- C級謀殺 C-Murder
- 尼克凱夫與華倫艾利斯 Nick Cave & Warren Ellis
- C21
- 核心塵土樂隊 Nitty Gritty Dirt Band
- 伏爾泰小酒館 Cabaret Voltaire
- 北方孤星 Novastar
- 凱撒大帝 CAESARS
- Ok Go
- 卡力 Cali
- 奧莉薇亞紐頓強 Olivia Newton-John
- 卡蜜兒 Camille
- 歐瑪瑞 Omarion
- 罐頭樂團 Can
- 黑夜行列合唱團OMD Orchestral Manoeuvres In The D
- 坎蒂絲妲頓 Candi Staton
- 聖堂豪傑 ORISHAS
- 領隊樂團 Captain
- 熊 Ours
- 卡爾諾倫 Carl Norén
- 歐文帕雷特 Owen Pallett
- 北方車庫樂團 CARPARK NORTH
- 保羅艾波朗 Pablo Alborán
- 凱斯馬克歐斯 Cass McCombs
- 佩特班納塔 Pat Benatar
- 卡休斯樂團 Cassius
- 派特格林 Pat Green
- 查爾阿茲納弗 Charles Aznavour
- 保羅安卡 Paul Anka
- 夏勒川諾 Charles Trenet
- 保羅麥卡尼 Paul McCartney
- 小查理 Charlie Green
- 保羅歐肯弗德 PAUL OAKENFOLD
- 貓兒 Chat
- 寶拉阿巴杜 Paula Abdul
- 恰布曼弭 Cheb Mami
- 寶琳 Pauline
- 恰布曼 Cheb Mami
- 亮點樂團 Peaking Lights
- 雪莉萊特 Chely Wright
- 企鵝咖啡館 Penguin Cafe Orchestra
- 珍愛天女合唱團 Cherish
- 羅克賽之皮爾蓋斯雷 Per Gessle
- 屎蛋幫 Chiddy Bang
- 寵物店男孩 Pet Shop Boys
- 首領樂團 Chief
- 彼得道堤 Peter Doherty
- 慶鷹 Chingy
- 彼得蓋布瑞爾 Peter Gabriel
- 克里斯汀史瓦力耶 Christian Chevallier
- 佩特菈 尚 菲莉普森 Petra Jean Phillipson
- 綺拉布蕾克 Cilla Black
- 街頭時尚教皇 菲董 PHARRELL WILLIAMS
- 曙光樂團 Civil Twilight
- 鳳凰樂團 Phoenix
- 克萊兒納穆爾 Claire Denamur
- 平克佛洛伊德 Pink Floyd
- 克里夫李察 Cliff Richard
- 小木偶 Pinocchio
- 克里夫李察和影子樂團 Cliff Richard & The Shadows
- 百憂解 Placebo
- 診療室樂團 Clinic
- 就是白樂團 Plain White T's
- 拒當倫敦佬樂團 Cockney Rejects
- 毒藥合唱團 Poison
- 酷玩樂團 Coldplay
- 保拉 Polar
- 魔法術 CONJURE ONE
- 波莉 Polly Scattergood
- 柯賓布魯 Corbin Bleu
- 搖滾起始 Prime Circle
- 肯妮貝兒 Corinne Bailey Rae
- 普莉西雅 Priscilla Ahn
- 就是這樣樂團 Correcto
- 格林老師 Professor Green
- 寇特妮洛芙 Courtney Love
- Psapp
- 主義合唱團 Creed
- 公共形象 Public Image Ltd (P.I.L.)
- 罪惡與城市之道 Crime And The City Solution
- 石器時代女王 Queens Of The Stone Age
- 擠屋合唱團 Crowded House
- 德國女皇合唱團 Queensryche
- 文化俱樂部合唱團 Culture Club
- R.E.M.
- 墓園三人組 Cypress Hill
- 電台四號樂團 RADIO 4
- 德美友誼社 D.A.F.
- 電台司令 Radiohead
- 傻瓜龐克 Daft Punk
- 雷蒙斯合唱團 Ramones
- 鼠尾老大與丹尼爾盧皮 Danger Mouse & Daniele Luppi
- 拉斐爾 Raphael
- 鼠尾老大與天馬樂團 Danger Mouse & Sparklehorse
- 拉菲爾 Raphael (Spain)
- 達瑞歐基 Dario G
- 雷可福磊斯合唱團 Rascal Flatts
- 戴利斯路克 Darius Rucker
- 雷查爾斯 Ray Charles
- 空氣之達克爾 Darkel
- 雷旺圖拉 Ray Ventura
- 戴夫高瀚 Dave Gahan
- 地產樂團 Real Estate
- 大衛鮑伊 David Bowie
- 報應樂團 Recoil
- 大衛庫塔 David Guetta
- 嗆辣紅椒合唱團 Red Hot Chili Peppers
- 大衛席維安 David Sylvian
- 雷恩哈德梅 Reinhard Mey
- 大衛華特 DAVID WALTERS
- K勢力樂團 RELIENT K
- 戴斯 Daz
- 雷諾德 Renaud
- 鼠來寶 Deadmau5
- 復古左輪 Revolver
- 狄恩馬汀 Dean Martin
- 李察艾希克羅 RICHARD ASHCROFT
- 深紫色合唱團 Deep Purple
- 李察哈里 Richard Hawley
- 黛莉雅與蓋文 Delia Gonzalez & gavin Russom
- 理察瑪爾克斯 Richard Marx
- DFB DEM FRANCHIZE BOYZ
- 希娜凱蒂 Rina Ketty
- 流行尖端 Depeche Mode
- 聳立樂團 Rise To Remain
- 浪跡天涯 Deportees
- 羅比威廉斯 Robbie Williams
- 德瑞克和克萊夫 Derek & Clive
- 羅勃帕瑪 Robert Palmer
- 狄克西午夜狂奔者 Dexy's Midnight Runners
- 羅伯藍道夫與家族樂團 Robert Randolph And The Family
- 璀鑽 Diam's
- 羅賓特羅爾 Robin Trower
- 戴蒙妲葛拉絲 Diamanda Galas
- 羅夫 Rohff
- 戴安娜羅絲 Diana Ross
- Moloko之蘿西墨菲 Roisin Murphy
- 黛安柏奇 Diane Birch
- 放肆翻滾樂團 Roll Deep
- 狄耶克斯班特利 Dierks Bentley
- 荷曼瑟達 Romane Serda
- 靡幻主義 DIGITALISM
- 羅珊凱許 Rosanne Cash
- 廣大群眾樂團 Dilated People
- 蘿西 Rose
- 迪奧高 Diogo Nogueira
- 羅克賽 Roxette
- 骯髒計畫 Dirty Projectors
- 羅西音樂 Roxy Music
- 骯髒計畫與碧玉 Dirty Projectors & Björk
- 皇家愛樂管弦樂團 Royal Philharmonic Orchestra
- 朵絲蕾娜 Dolcenera
- 洛伊薩普樂團 Röyksopp
- 多明尼克天字號 Dominique A
- 羅伊沃德樂團 Royworld
- 桃樂絲特洛伊 Doris Troy
- 李察艾希克羅與音樂聯合國 RPA And The United Nations Of
- 多佛樂團 Dover
- Runrig
- 鴿子樂團 Doves
- 莎賓娜 Sabrina Starke
- 開心醫生合唱團 Dr. Feelgood
- 聖靈 Sacred Spirit
- 虎克博士 Dr. Hook
- 杉德凡朵 Sander Van Doorn
- 約翰博士 Dr. John
- 珊蒂蕭 SANDIE SHAW
- 湯姆博士 Dr. Tom
- 珊卓拉 Sandra
- 恐怖地帶 Dreadzone
- 桑德琳 Sandrine Kiberlain
- BLUE 之 唐肯 Duncan James
- 小心樂團 Saosin
- 杜蘭杜蘭合唱團 Duran Duran
- 薩克森合唱團 Saxon
- 狄安吉羅 D'Angelo
- 史考特史戴普 Scott Stapp
- 厄莎姬特 Eartha Kitt
- 官樣文章 Scritti Politti
- Eazy-E
- 西巴豆樂團 Sebadoh
- 艾德哈寇 ED HARCOURT
- 騷動者樂團 Seether
- 艾迪柯克蘭 Eddie Cochran
- 席琳娜 Selena
- 艾德布勞頓樂團 Edgar Broughton Band
- 千年樂團 Sennen
- 橙橘之夢之愛德嘉佛洛斯 Edgar Froese
- 賽斯 Seth Gueko
- 伊迪絲琵雅芙 Edith Piaf
- 塞斯雷克曼 Seth Lakeman
- 艾格 E.g.
- 性手槍樂團 Sex Pistols
- 電光合唱團 Electric Light Orchestra (ELO)
- 變形雙俠 Shapeshifters
- 送報童里德 Eli 'Paperboy' Reed
- 夏恩穆林斯 Shawn Mullins
- 艾蓮艾莉亞 Eliane Elias
- 她和他樂團 She & Him
- 伊莉莎 Eliza Doolittle
- 狂嘯嘶吼樂團 SHOUT OUT LOUDS
- 艾略特史密斯 Elliott Smith
- 希雅 SIA
- 殷洛伊樂團 Eloy
- 生病狗狗樂團 Sick Puppies
- 貓王 Elvis Presley
- BLUE 之 賽門韋伯 Simon Webbe
- 艾蜜莉珊黛 Emeli Sandé
- 西蒙懷特 Simone White
- 艾蜜莉 Emily Osment
- 頭腦簡單合唱團 Simple Minds
- 艾明 Emin
- 就是紅合唱團 Simply Red
- 太陽帝國 Empire Of The Sun
- 辛妮歐康諾 Sinead O'connor
- 時尚終結者 END OF FASHION
- 搖滾小魔女 Skye Skye
- 謎 Enigma
- 嗜睡布朗 Sleepy Brown
- 顏尼歐莫里克奈 Ennio Morricone
- 史林惠特曼 Slim Whitman
- EPMD
- 潑婦樂團 Slut
- 滅跡合唱團 Erasure
- 非凡人物樂團 Smashing Pumpkins
- 艾瑞克裘奇 Eric Church
- 史努比狗狗 Snoop Dogg
- 艾瑞克普茲 Eric Prydz
- 蘇菲 O SOFFY O
- 伊天達荷 Etienne Daho
- 山卓勒許與對峙3人組 SONDRE LERCHE & THE FACES DOWN
- 伊天哲也 Etienne Jaumet
- 兒子女兒樂團 Sons & Daughters
- 尤金麥基尼斯 Eugene McGuinness
- 薩普落 Soprano
- 伊凡塞斯 Evanescence
- 靈魂復仇者 Soul Avengerz
- 青春無敵合唱團 Everlife
- 史班杜芭蕾 Spandau Ballet
- 只要女孩合唱團 Everything But The Girl
- 天馬樂團 Sparklehorse
- 費絲伊凡 FAITH EVANS
- 斯巴達樂團 SPARTA
- 法爾可 Falco
- 極速樂團 Speedway
- 肥仔喬 Fat Joe
- 辣妹合唱團 Spice Girls
- 浮士德 Faust
- 形而上合唱團 Spiritualized
- 芬黎樂團 Finley
- 幸福甜檸檬Stacie Stacie Orrico
- 軟腳蝦樂團 FLABBY
- 星航樂團 Starsailor
- 偉恩的噴泉樂團 FOUNTAINS OF WAYNE
- 鋼眼視線樂團 Steeleye Span
- 法蘭克波賽爾 Franck Pourcel
- 史黛拉 Stella Mwangi
- 馮絲華哈蒂 Francoise Hardy
- 立體音箱樂團 STERIOGRAM
- 法蘭克辛納屈 Frank Sinatra
- 史提夫曼森 Steve Mason
- 法蘭基米勒 Frankie Miller
- 史提夫曼森和丹尼斯波沃爾 Steve Mason & Dennis Bovell
- 皇后合唱團之佛萊迪墨裘瑞 FREDDIE MERCURY
- 史提查普曼 Steven Curtis Chapman
- 自由能量樂團 Free Energy
- 史都華麥克 Stewart Mac
- 歡樂三男組 Fun Boy Three
- 次音速樂團 Subsonica
- 芙莉雅樂團 FURIA
- 超級幼苗 Supergrass
- 銀河五百樂團 Galaxie 500
- 蘇珊薇格 SUZANNE VEGA
- 黑幫英雄 Gang Starr
- 蘇西奎特蘿 Suzi Quatro
- 蓋瑞摩爾 Gary Moore
- 瑞典浩室黑手黨 Swedish House Mafia
- X 世代樂團 Generation X
- 席德波瑞特 Syd Barrett
- 創世紀合唱團 Genesis
- 說話藝術合唱團 Talk Talk
- 溫柔的巨人樂團 Gentle Giant
- 臉部特寫合唱團 Talking Heads
- 喬治登尼爾斯 Georg Wadenius
- 橙橘之夢 Tangerine Dream
- 喬治芬頓與BBC交響樂團 George Fenton With The BBC Orc * 駕馭浩室樂團 Teamster
- 喬治哈里森 George Harrison
- 泰迪湯普森 Teddy Thompson
- 喬治索羅古德 George Thorogood
- 青少年俱樂部合唱團與傑德菲爾 Teenage Fanclub & Jad Fair
- 喬治索羅古德與摧毀者合唱團 George Thorogood & The Destroy
- 電氣拍普樂團 TELEPOPMUSIK
- 喬治蓋塔理 Georges Guetary
- 電報機樂團 Telex
- 喬治裘邦 Georges Jouvin
- 十年後合唱團 Ten Years After
- 葛瑞拉菲提 Gerry Rafferty
- 聖母合唱團泰瑞莎與巴西音樂大師 TERESA SALGUEIRO & SEPTETO DE
- 吉柏貝考 Gilbert Becaud
- 情色幻眼樂團 THE 69 EYES
- 葛倫坎坡 Glen Campbell
- 異形樂團 THE ALIENS
- 冰金樂團 Goldfrapp
- 叛客魔咒之全能好手樂團 THE ALMOST
- 高梅茲 GOMEZ
- 諾亞方舟樂團 The Ark
- 狂野夏洛特 Good Charlotte
- 樂隊合唱團 The Band
- 街頭霸王 Gorillaz
- 英國皇家御林軍連隊軍樂隊 The Band Of The Grenadier Guar
- 葛拉罕卡克森 Graham Coxon
- 海灘男孩合唱團 The Beach Boys
- 格蘭費雪 Gran Bel Fisher
- 披頭四 The Beatles
- 格蘭大道 Grand Avenue
- 小蜜蜂合唱團 THE BEES
- 大放克鐵道合唱團 Grand Funk Railroad
- 貝塔樂團 The Beta Band
- 大白鯊合唱團 Great White
- 小鳥與蜜蜂 The Bird And The Bee
- 葛瑞格拉斯威爾 Greg Laswell
- 藍色飛機樂團 The Blue Aeroplanes
- 尼克凱夫之齧齒人樂團 Grinderman
- 傻瓜狗狗樂團 The Bonzo Dog Band
- 蓋麥紐基恩 Guy Manoukian
- 化學兄弟 The Chemical Brothers
- 荷黛絲 Hadise
- 花栗鼠三重唱 The Chipmunks
- 鷹族雄風樂團 Hawkwind
- 孔固力樂團 THE CONCRETES
- 海瑟海德利 Heather Hedley
- 伯爵和辛登 The Count And Sinden
- 天堂17樂團 Heaven 17
- 丹地沃荷 The Dandy Warhols
- 海倫夏佩羅 Helen Shapiro
- 壓軸樂團 The Decemberists
- 費莎 Helene Fischer
- 神聖喜劇 THE DIVINE COMEDY
- 亨利薩爾瓦多 Henri Salvador
- 墮落樂團 The Fall
- 沈默英雄樂團 Heroes Del Silencio
- 菲里斯合唱團 The Feelies
- 公路狂徒 Highwaymen
- 芬氏兄弟 THE FINN BROTHERS
- 希拉蕊 Hilary Duff
- 加油合唱團 The Go-Go's
- 好奇樂團 Hockey
- 善性樂團 The Good Natured
- 勁辣薯片 Hot Chip
- The Good, The Bad & The Queen
- 熱巧克力 Hot Chocolate
- 赫里斯合唱團 The Hollies
- 霍華德卡本達 Howard Carpendale
- 日本明星夢工廠 The Japanese Popstars
- 人類聯盟合唱團 Human League
- 殺手樂團 The Kills
- 亨佛萊利托頓樂團 Humphrey Lyttelton & His Band
- 傻瓜樂團 The Kooks
- 來自巴塞隆納 I'm From Barcelona
- 末代皮影樂團 The Last Shadow Puppets
- 伊恩安德森 Ian Anderson
- 小東西樂團 THE LITTLE ONES
- 冰塊 Ice Cube
- 小鳥與蜜蜂之小鳥三重唱 The Living Sisters
- 荒野樂團 Idlewild
- 磁場樂團 The Magnetic Fields
- 伊吉帕普 Iggy Pop
- 麥可旋克 The Michael Schenker Group
- 伊瑪 Imam Baildi
- 樂音樂團 The Music
- Indigo藍 Indigo
- 暢快樂團 The Nice
- 藍色少女合唱團 Indigo Girls
- 恐慌計畫 The Panic Channel
- 神奇魔毯合唱團 Inspiral Carpets
- 粉蠟筆與網球外套樂團 The Pastels / Tenniscoats
- 國際刑警樂團 INTERPOL
- 普羅克萊門兄弟 The Proclaimers
- 鐵娘子樂團 Iron Maiden
- 失常樂團 The Quireboys
- 伊凡諾佛薩地 Ivano Fossati
- 羅達黑天教寺 The Radha Krsna Temple
- J. Holiday
- 鼠黨 The Rat Pack
- 傑克羅馬克思 Jackie Lomax
- 紅衫軍樂團 The Red Jumpsuit Apparatus
- 雅克伊熱蘭 Jacques Higelin
- 勞伯克雷樂團 The Robert Cray Band
- 潔米莉雅 Jamelia
- 滾石合唱團 The Rolling Stone
- 詹姆斯泰勒 James Taylor
- 聖徒樂團 The Saints
- 詹姆斯約克 James Yorkston
- 逐夢者合唱團 The Seekers
- 詹姆斯約克與大眼睛樂團 James Yorkston & The Big Eyes Family Players
- The Source與坎蒂絲妲頓 The Source Feat Candi Staton
- 怪咖傑米 Jamie T
- 特別人物合唱團 The Specials
- 珍寶金 Jane Birkin
- 史賓托樂團 THE SPINTO BAND
- 珍的耽溺合唱團 Jane's Addiction
- 羅比威廉斯與鐵衛部隊 The Squad
- 珍娜傑克森 Janet Jackson
- 行刑者合唱團 The Stranglers
- 傑諾歐森 JANOVE OTTESEN
- 顫動樂團 The Thrills
- 日本合唱團 Japan
- 神韻合唱團 The Verve
- 傑杰強森 Jay-Jay Johanson
- 番仔樂團 The Vines
- 德國新爵士樂隊 Jazzanova
- 水男孩合唱團 The Waterboys
- 尚沙伯龍 Jean Sablon
- 華生雙姝 The Watson Twins
- 尚路易歐貝 Jean-Louis Aubert
- 小鬼當家樂團 These Kids Wear Crowns
- 尚路易穆哈 Jean-Louis Murat
- 新教徒樂團 These New Puritans
- 吉妮奧蒂嘉 Jeannie Ortega
- 湯瑪斯道比 Thomas Dolby
- JD JERMAINE DUPRI
- 悸動軟骨 Throbbing Gristle
- 傑洛米范登豪 Jerome Van Den Hole
- 雷霆樂團 Thunder
- 傑西庫克 Jesse Cook
- 蒂娜亞瑞娜 Tina Arena
- 傑西麥卡尼 Jesse McCartney
- 蒂娜透娜 Tina Turner
- 噴射機合唱團 Jet
- 天霸泰尼 Tinie Tempah
- 傑叟羅圖樂團 Jethro Tull
- 小人物大英雄樂團 Tiny Masters Of Today
- 金布里克曼 JIM BRICKMAN
- 提杰安若費洛 Tiziano Ferro
- 神氣活現的兔子 Jive Bunny
- 造反樂團 To Kill A King
- 喬庫克 Joe Cooker
- 頹廢洛可可樂團 To Rococo Rot
- 喬伊蒙大拿 Joey Montana
- 湯姆瓊斯 Tom Jones
- 約翰貝瑞 John Barry
- 湯尼艾倫 Tony Allen
- 約翰凱爾 John Cale
- 湯尼馮查德 Townes Van Zandt
- 嗆辣紅椒之約翰伏許安 John Frusciante
- 崔斯艾金斯 Trace Adkins
- 約翰藍儂 John Lennon
- 崔西索恩 Tracey Thorn
- 約翰塔弗納 John Tavener
- 崔西垃圾拖車樂團 Trailer Trash Tracys
- 強尼克雷格 Johnny Clegg
- 詭計合唱團 Tricky
- 強尼溫特 JOHNNY WINTER
- 詭計合唱團與南方好傢伙 Tricky Meets South Rakkas Crew
- 鬼靈精 Joker's Daughter
- 崔絲坦 Tristan Prettyman
- 強霍普金斯 Jon Hopkins
- 搞怪安德魯 Trouble Andrew
- 強納斯兄弟 JONAS BROTHERS
- TRU
- 席格若斯之雍希 Jonsi
- 修車電工 TURNER
- 席格若斯之雍希+艾力克 Jonsi & Alex
- 崔姬 Twiggy
- 喬丹波特 Jordan Pruitt
- 孿生姊妹樂團 Twin Sister
- 喬瑟芬貝克 Josephine Baker
- UB40
- 約書亞凱迪森 JOSHUA KADISON
- 幽浮合唱團 UFO
- 喬絲史東 Joss Stone
- 超音波樂團 Ultravox
- 璜路易斯蓋德拉 Juan Luis Guerra
- 叛客魔咒樂團 Underoath
- 茱莉‧倫敦 Julie London
- V.E
- 朱利安克雷 Julien Clerc
- 瓦萊里奧 Valerio Scanu
- 小伙子樂團 Junior Boys
- 梵杭特 VAN HUNT
- 賈斯汀諾魯卡 Justin Nozuka
- 范莫里森 Van Morrison
- K-OS
- 薇妮 Vanessa Hudgens
- 卡加咕咕合唱團和利瑪 Kajagoogoo & Limahl
- 陳美 VANESSA-MAE
- 凱西黔柏絲 Kasey Chambers
- 媧庭娜女歌隊 Varttina
- 凱特布希 Kate Bush
- 瓦斯科羅西 Vasco Rossi
- 凱特萊恩 Kate Ryan
- 薇拉琳恩 Vera Lynn
- 凱西與陽光合唱團 KC & The Sunshine Band
- VHS或BETA VHS OR BETA
- 齊斯艾本 Keith Urban
- 村民樂團 Villagers
- 酷莉絲 Kelis
- 溫尼 Vinnie Who
- 肯尼羅傑斯 Kenny Rogers
- 退色狀態 Washed Out
- 凱倫安 Keren Ann
- 臨界點樂團 Watershed
- 凱文艾爾斯 Kevin Ayers
- 自然科學家樂團 We Are Scientists
- 琪琪蒂 Kiki Dee
- 聖徒當機樂團 When Saints Go Machine
- 金卡恩絲 Kim Carnes
- 破壞狂樂團 Whirlwind Heat
- 金懷德 Kim Wilde
- 小白兔樂團 White Rabbits
- 特大號加農炮樂團 King Cannons
- 白蛇合唱團 Whitesnake
- 雜酚王道 King Creosote
- 瘋狂野獸合唱團 Wild Beasts
- 雜酚王道與強霍普金斯 King Creosote & Jon Hopkins
- 威利尼爾森 Willie Nelson
- 好自在樂團 Kings Of Convenience
- 威利曼森 WILLY MASON
- 克里 Kleerup
- 大英雄樂團 WIR SIND HELDEN
- 魔幻電音 KOMPUTER
- 鋼索樂團 Wire
- 崆樂團 Korn
- 恬野雛菊樂團 WIRE DAISIES
- 電力站樂團 Kraftwerk
- 羅伯維特，阿茲蒙與史提芬 Wyatt, Atzmon & Stephen
- 黑色風暴樂團 KRYPTERIA
- 楊提爾森 Yann Tiersen
- KT Tunstall * 雅族合唱團 Yazoo
- 拉比席佛瑞 Labi Siffre
- 肯定樂團 Yeasayer
- 淑女與鳥 Lady & Bird
- 黃色卡片 Yellowcard
- 懷舊女郎 Lady Antebellum
- 老大來了 Yo Majesty
- 菈妃 Lafee
- 小野洋子 Yoko Ono
- 慵懶樂團 Laid Back
- 小野洋子 YOKO ONO
- 蘿拉曼寧 Laura Marling
- 活力小子 You Me At Six
- 蘿拉 蜜雪兒 凱莉 LAURA MICHELLE KELLY
- 伊孚杜得 Yves Duteil
- 雷斯魔之洛力 Lauri
- Zaho
- 液晶大喇叭 LCD Soundsystem
- 絕對零度樂團 Zero Assoluto
- 琳恩瑪蓮 Lene Marlin
- 佐伊 Zoe
