= List of Hong Kong films of 2001 =

This article lists feature-length Hong Kong films released in 2001.

== Box office ==
The highest-grossing Hong Kong films released in 2001 by domestic box office gross revenue, are as follows:

Highest-grossing films released in 2001
| Rank | Title | Domestic gross |
|---|---|---|
| 1 | Shaolin Soccer | HK$60,739,847 |
| 2 | Love on a Diet | HK$40,435,886 |
| 3 | The Accidental Spy | HK$30,009,076 |
| 4 | Wu Yen | HK$27,241,696 |
| 5 | Fulltime Killer | HK$25,682,414 |
| 6 | La Brassiere | HK$18,502,479 |
| 7 | Old Master Q 2001 | HK$18,360,926 |
| 8 | Fighting for Love | HK$18,229,094 |
| 9 | Dance of a Dream | HK$17,793,971 |
| 10 | My Life as McDull | HK$14,571,605 |

== Releases ==
| Title | Director | Cast | Genre | Notes |
|---|---|---|---|---|
| 2002 | Wilson Yip | Nicholas Tse, Stephen Fung, Sam Lee | Science fiction | |
| The 51st State | Ronny Yu | | | |
| A Gambler's Story | Marco Mak Chi-Sin | Francis Ng Chun-Yu, Suki Kwan Sau-Mei | | |
| The Accidental Spy | Teddy Chen | Jackie Chan, Eric Tsang, Vivian Hsu | Action/Adventure/Martial Arts | |
| All the Way | Shi Runjiu | | | |
| An Mo Nu Lang | | | | |
| Angel Cop - Final Crisis | Lam Ang Hang | | | |
| The Avenging Fist | Andrew Lau | | | |
| Bakery Amour | Steven Lo | | | |
| Beijing Rocks | Mabel Cheung | | | |
| Blood Cold And Proud Hot | Huang Jian Zhong | | | |
| Bloody Cops | Kenneth Lau | | | |
| Dance of a Dream | Andrew Lau | Andy Lau, Sandra Ng, Anita Mui | | |
| Devil Eye | Larry Chin | Cheung Tat-ming, Michael Tse, Iris Chai, Cindy Au, Iris Wong, Amy Ng | Horror | |
| Fighting for Love | Joe Ma | Tony Leung Chiu-Wai, Sammi Cheng, Niki Chow | Comedy / Romance | |
| The Final Winner | Ali Wong | Michael Tse, Benny Chan, Chen Kuan-tai, Jackie Lui | | |
| Fulltime Killer | Johnnie To, Wai Ka-Fai | Andy Lau, Takeshi Sorimaci | Action drama | |
| Headlines | Heung Lap Hang | Wakin Chau, Daniel Wu, Maggie Cheung Ho-yee, Wayne Lai | | |
| Hollywood Hong Kong | Fruit Chan | | | |
| Human Pork Chop | Benny Chan Chi Shun | Wayne Lai, Emily Kwan, Amanda Lee, Law Lan | Crime | |
| I Am Not What You Want | Wing Kit Hung | Chet Lam | | |
| Juliet in Love | Wilson Yip | Francis Ng, Sandra Ng, Tats Lau | Romance | |
| July Rhapsody | Ann Hui | Jacky Cheung, Anita Mui, Kar Yan Lam | Drama | 4 Hong Kong Film Awards |
| Lan Yu | Stanley Kwan | Hu Jun, Liu Ye | | Screened at the 2001 Cannes Film Festival |
| The Legend of Zu | Tsui Hark | Ekin Cheng, Cecilia Cheung, Louis Koo, Patrick Tam, Kelly Lin, Zhang Ziyi, Sammo Hung, Jacky Wu | Fantasy, Martial arts film | |
| The Losers' Club | Patrick Yau | Eric Tsang, Francis Ng, Maggie Shiu, Michael Tse, Ruby Wong, Lo Hoi-pang | Comedy | |
| Love Me, Love My Money | Wong Jing | Tony Leung Chiu-Wai, Shu Qi, Gordon Lam, Teresa Mak | Romance / Comedy | |
| Love on a Diet | Johnnie To, Wai Ka-Fai | Andy Lau, Sammi Cheng | Comedy / Romance | |
| Lunch with Charles | Michael Parker | Lau Ching Wan, Nicholas Lea, Theresa Lee, Bif Naked, Françoise Yip, Cheung Chang | Romantic Comedy | |
| Master Q 2001 | Herman Yau | Nicholas Tse, Cecilia Cheung, Wayne Lai, Chan Wai-Man, Alfred Cheung | | |
| Peony Pavilion | Yonfan | | | Entered into the 23rd Moscow International Film Festival |
| Prison on Fire - Life Sentence | Edward Yuen | Ben Wong, Iris Wong, Tommy Wong, William Ho, Lee Wai Kei, Chapman To, Bill Lung | Crime | |
| Shaolin Soccer | Stephen Chow | Stephen Chow, Zhao Wei, Ng Man Tat, Patrick Tse, Wong Yat Fei, Danny Chan Kwok Kwan | Comedy, Martial arts | |
| There is a Secret in my Soup | Yeung Chi Kin | Cherry Chan, Chan Chung Wai, Christy Cheung | Horror | |
| Tough Cop Inside | Yip Wai Ying | Joe Ma, Simon Lui, Natalie Ng | | |
| Troublesome Night 9 | Ivan Lai | Simon Lui, Maggie Cheung Ho-Yee, Law Lan, Halina Tam, Wayne Lai | Romance, comedy, horror | |
| Troublesome Night 10 | Edmond Yuen | Wayne Lai, Law Lan, Sherming Yiu, Tong Ka-Fai, Grace Lam | Romance, comedy, horror | |
| Troublesome Night 11 | Yeung Wan-King | Law Lan, Halina Tam, David Lee, Tong Ka-Fai, Ronnie Cheung, Teresa Mak, Bessie Chan, Vivian Lok | Romance, comedy, horror | |
| Troublesome Night 12 | Yip Wai-Ying | Law Lan, Angie Cheung, May Kwong, Tong Ka-Fai, Ronnie Cheung | Romance, comedy, horror | |
| Wu yen | Johnnie To, Wai Ka-Fai | Anita Mui, Sammi Cheng, Cecilia Cheung | Historical, Comedy | |
