= List of Hong Kong films of 2002 =

This article lists feature-length Hong Kong films released in 2002.

== Box office ==
The highest-grossing Hong Kong films released in 2002 by domestic box office gross revenue, are as follows:

Highest-grossing films released in 2002
Rank	Title	Domestic gross
1	Infernal Affairs	HK$55,057,176
2	Marry a Rich Man	HK$21,688,609
3	My Left Eye Sees Ghosts	HK$20,708,935
4	Fat Choi Spirit	HK$19,218,759
5	Mighty Baby	HK$19,021,894
6	Golden Chicken	HK$17,290,173
7	The Eye	HK$13,733,856
8	Dry Wood Fierce Fire	HK$13,112,593
9	Chinese Odyssey 2002	HK$13,051,225
10	The Lion Roars	HK$11,930,124

== Releases ==
Title	Director	Cast	Genre	Notes
45 Days Lover	Chow Jan Wing		Romance	
Angels Model	Leung Hoi Kit			
The Assailant	Tony Leung			
An Autumn Diary	Lam Kin Lung			
Battle Against Evil				
Beauty and the Breast	Raymond Yip	Francis Ng, Michelle Reis, Daniel Wu, Halina Tam	Comedy	
Big Boss Untouchable	Kant Leung			
Black Mask 2 : City Of Masks	Tsui Hark			
Book and Sword, Gratitude and Revenge	Li Guo Li		TV series	
Chinese Odyssey 2002	Jeffrey Lau	Tony Leung Chiu-Wai, Faye Wong, Zhao Wei	Comedy	
Devil Face, Angel Heart	Billy Chung	Daniel Wu, Stephen Fung, Gigi Lai, Sam Lee, Lam Suet, Kelly Lin	Thriller	
The Era of Vampires	Wellson Chin	Danny Chan Kwok Kwan, Michael Chow, Ken Chang, Lam Suet, Anya, Yu Rongguang, Lee Lik-Chi, Chen Kuan Tai		
The Eye	Oxide Pang	Lee Sin-je, Lawrence Chou, Candy Lo, Pierre Png, Edmund Chen, Wilson Yip	Horror	
Fat Choi Spirit	Johnnie To, Wai Ka-Fai	Andy Lau, Gigi Leung	Comedy	
Hero	Zhang Yimou	Jet Li, Tony Leung Chiu-Wai, Maggie Cheung, Chen Daoming, Zhang Ziyi, Donnie Yen	Action / Martial arts / Drama / History	
Infernal Affairs	Andrew Lau, Alan Mak	Andy Lau, Tony Leung Chiu-Wai, Anthony Wong, Eric Tsang	Crime	7 Hong Kong Film Awards
Inner Senses	Law Chi-Leung	Leslie Cheung, Karena Lam	Horror	
My Left Eye Sees Ghosts	Johnnie To, Wai Ka-Fai	Sammi Cheng, Lau Ching Wan, Cherrie Ying		
So Close	Corey Yuen	Shu Qi, Zhao Wei, Karen Mok	Action	
Tiramisu	Dante Lam	Nicholas Tse, Karena Lam	Romance fantasy	
Troublesome Night 13	Chan Yiu-Ming	Law Lan, Ken Wong, Anita Chan, Ronnie Cheung, Tong Ka-Fai, Crystal Cheung, Yu Ka-Ho	Horror, romance, comedy	
Troublesome Night 14	Yip Wai-Ying	Law Lan, Joe Junior, Si Ming, Emily Kwan, Iris Chai, Tong Ka-Fai, Ronnie Cheung, Anita Chan	Horror, romance, comedy	
Troublesome Night 15	Jamie Luk Kim-Ming	Law Lan, Eric Tsang, Edmond Leung, Tong Ka-Fai, Ronnie Cheung, Anita Chan	Horror, romance, comedy	
Troublesome Night 16	Yip Wai-Ying	Law Lan, Simon Lui, Yammie Nam, Tong Ka-Fai, Ronnie Cheung, Kenny Bee	Horror, romance, comedy	
Troublesome Night 17	Lam Wai-Yin	Law Lan, Simon Lui, Sam Lee, Teresa Mak, Tong Ka-Fai, Ronnie Cheung, Anita Chan	Horror, romance, comedy	
The Untold Story - The Lost World	Hoh Chi Hang	Wayne Lai, Fennie Yuen, Joyce Tang, Marco Ngai, Amanda Lee, Michael Tao		
Visible Secret 2	Abe Kwong	Eason Chan, Cherrie Ying, Roger Kwok		
The Wesley's Mysterious File	Andrew Lau	Andy Lau, Shu Qi, Rosamund Kwan		
A Wicked Ghost III: The Possession	Hung Chung-Hap	Gigi Lai, Cheung Tat-Ming, Grace Lam, Yip Sai Wing, Wayne Lai, Patrick Keung, Jenny Yam, Joyce Han		
