= List of horror films of 1997 =

A list of horror films released in 1997.

Horror films released in 1997
Title	Director	Cast	Country	Notes
Aberration	Tim Boxell	Pamela Gidley, Simon Bossell, Valeriy Nikolaev	New Zealand	
American Vampire	Luis Esteban	Trevor Lissauer, Carmen Electra, Adam West	United States	Horror comedy
Alien Resurrection	Jean-Pierre Jeunet	Sigourney Weaver, Winona Ryder, Ron Perlman	United States	Science fiction horror
An American Werewolf in Paris	Anthony Waller	Tom Everett Scott, Julie Delpy, Vince Vieluf	United Kingdom; Netherlands; Luxembourg	Horror comedy
Anaconda	Luis Llosa	Jennifer Lopez, Ice Cube, Jon Voight, Eric Stoltz, Jonathan Hyde, Owen Wilson, Kari Wuhrer	United States	
Bleeders	Peter Svatek	Rutger Hauer, Roy Dupuis	Canada; Germany	
The Bloody Ape	Keith Crocker	George Reis, Paul Richici, Chris Hoskins, Larry Koster, Arlene Hansen	United States	
Breeders	Paul Matthews	Samantha Womack, Clifton Lloyd Bryan, Kadamba Simmons	United Kingdom	
Campfire Tales	Matt Cooper, David Semel, Martin Kunert	Chris Masterson, Christine Taylor, Jay R. Ferguson	United States	
The Creeps	Charles Band	Justin Lauer, Andrea Harper, Jon Simanton	United States	
Cube	Vincenzo Natali	Nicole de Boer, Nicky Guadagni, David Hewlett	Canada	Science fiction horror
Cupid	Doug Campbell	Zach Galligan, Ashley Laurence, Mary Crosby	United States	
Cure	Kiyoshi Kurosawa	Kōji Yakusho, Tsuyoshi Ujiki, Anna Nakagawa	Japan	
The Devil's Advocate	Taylor Hackford	Keanu Reeves, Al Pacino, Charlize Theron	United States	
The Devil's Child	Bobby Roth	Kim Delaney, Gia Carides, Maya Rudolph, Matthew Lillard	United States	Television film
The Eighteenth Angel	William Bindley	Christopher McDonald, Rachael Leigh Cook, Stanley Tucci	United States	
Eko eko azaraku III	Katsuhito Ueno	Hinako Saeki, Cho Bang-ho, Chika Fujimura	Japan	
Event Horizon	Paul W. S. Anderson	Laurence Fishburne, Sam Neill, Kathleen Quinlan, Joely Richardson	United States	Science fiction horror
Fever Lake	Rafe M. Portilo	Corey Haim, Mario López, Bo Hopkins	United States	
Gut-Pile	Jerry O'Sullivan	Sasha Graham	United States	
Halik	Don Escudero	Christopher De Leon, Ruffa Gutierrez, Alma Concepcion	Philippines	
Halik ng Vampira	Peque Gallaga	Anjanette Abayari, Raymond Bagatsing, Beth Tamayo, Michael V., Patrick Guzman, Marc Solis, Jason Salcedo, Jaime Fabregas, Romy Romulo, Nathan Forrest, Engie Allarey, Ian Veneracion	Philippines	
The Haunted Sea	Dan Golden	Krista Allen, James Brolin, Joanna Pacula, Don Stroud	United States	
House of Frankenstein	Peter Werner	Andrew Pasdar, Teri Polo, Jorja Fox	United States	
I Know What You Did Last Summer	Jim Gillespie	Jennifer Love Hewitt, Sarah Michelle Gellar, Ryan Phillippe, Freddie Prinze, Jr.	United States	
Jack Frost	Michael Cooney	Christopher Allport, Stephen Mendel, F. William Parker	United States	Horror comedy
Kiss the Girls Goodbye	Lee Karaim	Frankie Ray, Stephanie Shaub, Ann O'Leary	United States	
Kokkuri-san	Takahisa Zeze	Ayumi Yamatsu, Rika Furukawa, Moe Ishikawa	Japan	
Les deux orphelines vampires	Jean Rollin	Alexandra Pic, Isabelle Teboul, Bernard Charnacé, Nathalie Perrey	France	
The Manson Family	Jim Van Bebber	Marcelo Games, Marc Pitman, Leslie Orr	United States	
Mimic	Guillermo del Toro	Mira Sorvino, Jeremy Northam, Josh Brolin, Charles S. Dutton, Giancarlo Giannini, F. Murray Abraham	United States	Science fiction horror
The Necro Files	Matt Jaissle	Gary Browning, Steve Sheppard, Isaac Cooper	United States	Horror comedy
The Night Flier	Mark Pavia	Miguel Ferrer, Julie Entwisle, Dan Monahan	United States	
Night of the Demons III	Jimmy Kaufman	Joel Gordon, Richard Jutras, Vlasta Vrána	Canada; United States	
Nightwatch	Ole Bornedal	Ewan McGregor, Patricia Arquette, Nick Nolte, Josh Brolin	United States	Film remake
The Nurse	Robert Malenfant	Lisa Zane, Janet Gunn, John Stockwell	United States	
Office Killer	Cindy Sherman	Carol Kane, David Thornton, Molly Ringwald, Jeanne Tripplehorn, Barbara Sukowa	United States	Horror comedy
Premutos: The Fallen Angel	Olaf Ittenbach	Fidelis Atuma, Christopher Stacey, Andre Stryi	Germany	
Quicksilver Highway	Mick Garris	Christopher Lloyd, Matt Frewer	United States	Television film
The Relic	Peter Hyams	Penelope Ann Miller, Tom Sizemore, Linda Hunt	United States	
Scream 2	Wes Craven	David Arquette, Neve Campbell, Courteney Cox	United States	
Shopping for Fangs	Quentin Lee, Justin Lin	Jeanne Chinn, Clint Jung, Peggy Ahn	Canada; United States	Horror comedy
Skeletons	David DeCoteau	Christopher Plummer, Dee Wallace, Ron Silver	United States	
Sorceress II: The Temptress	Richard Styles	Julie Strain, Greg Wrangler, Sandahl Bergman	United States	
Spawn	Mark A.Z. Dippé	Michael Jai White, John Leguizamo, Martin Sheen	United States	Action horror
Troublesome Night	Steve Cheng, Victor Tam, Herman Yau	Simon Lui, Louis Koo, Allen Ting, Ada Choi, Teresa Mak, Law Lan	Hong Kong	Horror comedy
Troublesome Night 2	Herman Yau	Simon Lui, Louis Koo, Allen Ting, Chin Kar Lok	Hong Kong	Horror comedy
Trucks	Chris Thomson	Timothy Busfield, Brenda Bakke, Brendan Fletcher	United States; Canada	Television film
Twists of Terror	Douglas Jackson	Jennifer Rubin, Françoise Robertson, Nick Mancuso, Joseph Ziegler	Canada	Television film
The Killing Jar	Evan Crooke	Brett Cullen, Tamlyn Tomita, Wes Studi, Xander Berkley	United States	
The Ugly	Scott Reynolds	Paolo Rotondo, Rebecca Hobbs, Jennifer Ward-Lealand	New Zealand	
Wax Mask	Sergio Stivaletti	Romina Mondello, Robert Hossein	Italy	
Wishmaster	Robert Kurtzman	Tammy Lauren, Andrew Divoff, Robert Englund	United States	
Witchcraft IX: Bitter Flesh	Michael Paul Girard	Alyssa Lobit, Mikul Robins, Christian Malmin	United States	
