= List of Hong Kong films of 2000 =

This article lists feature-length Hong Kong films released in 2000.

== Box office ==
The highest-grossing Hong Kong films released in 2000 by domestic box office gross revenue, are as follows:

Highest-grossing films released in 2000
Rank	Title	Domestic gross
1	Needing You...	HK$35,214,661
2	Tokyo Raiders	HK$28,187,905
3	A Fighter's Blues	HK$21,997,195
4	Summer Holiday	HK$21,336,647
5	The Duel	HK$21,332,884
6	China Strike Force	HK$20,513,906
7	Healing Hearts	HK$15,527,789
8	Sausalito	HK$15,136,981
9	Crouching Tiger, Hidden Dragon	HK$14,764,598
10	Lavender	HK$14,554,221

== Releases ==
Title	Director	Cast	Genre	Notes
2000 AD	Gordon Chan	Aaron Kwok, Phyllis Quek, James Lye, Daniel Wu		
990714.com	Hui Mei Kwan, Kwong Kam Wang			
9th September	La			
And I Hate You So	Yee Chung-Man			
Anywhere But Here				
Are You Lonesome Tonight	Kam Gor			
The Assassin Swordsman	Kevin Chu			
Baroness	Anthony Lau Wing			
Bio-Cops	Steve Cheng			
Black Blood	Wong Chung			
Black Cat in Jail	Andy Ng			
Born to Be King	Andrew Lau	Ekin Cheng, Jordan Chan, Gigi Lai, Shu Qi, Michael Tse		
Bruce Lee: A Warrior's Journey	John Little, Bruce Lee	Bruce Lee, Jackie Chan, Sammo Hung, Linda Lee Cadwell, John Little		
Comic King	O Sing Pui	Nicholas Tse, Ruby Lin, Julian Cheung, Eason Chan, Hacken Lee	Comedy	
The Duel	Andrew Lau	Andy Lau, Ekin Cheng, Zhao Wei		
Durian Durian	Fruit Chan	Qin Hailu, Mak Wai-Fan, Mak Suet-Man, Yeung Mei-Kam, Chang Kin-Yung	Drama	
A Fighter's Blues	Daniel Lee	Andy Lau		
Fist Power	Aman Chang	Vincent Zhao, Anthony Wong, Gigi Lai, Sam Lee	Action	
In the Mood for Love	Wong Kar-wai			Entered into the 2000 Cannes Film Festival
Needing You...	Johnnie To, Wai Ka-Fai	Andy Lau, Sammi Cheng		
Roaring Wheels	Aman Chang	Dave Wong, Karen Mok, Maggie Siu, Moses Chan		
Those Were the Days	Raymond Yip	Jordan Chan, Gigi Leung, Michael Tse, Jason Chu, Sandra Ng, Jerry Lamb, Ekin Cheng		
Time and Tide	Tsui Hark	Nicholas Tse, Wu Bai, Candy Lo, Cathy Tsui, Anthony Wong	Action	
Tokyo Raiders	Jingle Ma	Tony Leung Chiu-Wai, Ekin Cheng, Kelly Chen, Cecilia Cheung		
Troublesome Night 7	Nam Yin	Louis Koo, Nadia Chan, Simon Lui, Amanda Lee Wai Man, Wayne Lai, Law Lan	Horror, Romance, Comedy	
Troublesome Night 8	Edmond Yuen	Nadia Chan, Simon Lui, Law Lan, Maggie Cheung Ho Yee, Tong Ka-Fai, Halina Tam	Horror, Romance, Comedy	
Undercover Blues	Billy Chung	Mark Cheung, Ray Lui, Simon Lui, Daniel Wu	Crime, Drama	
Violent Cop	Leung Wang Fat	Patrick Tam, Pinky Cheung, Chapman To	Action	
Violent Cop	Steve Cheng	Anthony Wong, Michael Wong	Action	
When I Fall in Love... with Both	Samson Chiu	Fann Wong, Michelle Reis, Theresa Lee		
A Wicked Ghost II: The Fear	Francis Nam	Joey Meng, Angie Cheung, Alice Chan, Ken Wong, Joyce Chan, Chow Yan Yan	Horror	
Winner Takes All	Clifton Ko	Nicholas Tse, Samuel Hui, Karl Maka, Ruby Lin, Joey Yung, Raymond Wong, Alec Su, Annie Wu	Comedy	
