= Always Be with You (film) =

2017 Hong Kong film by Herman Yau

Always Be With You
- Theatrical release poster
- Chinese: 常在你左右
- Hanyu Pinyin: Cháng zài nǐ zuǒ yòu
- Jyutping: seung4 joi6 nei5 jor2 yau6
- Directed by: Herman Yau
- Written by: Herman Yau; Yan Pak-wing; Mani Man; Ho Wing-hong
- Produced by: Nam Yin; Stanley Tong
- Starring: Louis Koo; Julian Cheung; Gordon Lam; Charlene Choi; Charmaine Sheh
- Cinematography: Joe Chan; Mandy Ngai
- Edited by: Azrael Chung
- Music by: Brother Hung
- Production companies: Sil-Metropole Organisation; Sun Entertainment Culture; Er Dong Pictures; Sublime Media; China 3D Digital Entertainment Limited; Fei Fan Entertainment
- Distributed by: Sil-Metropole Organisation; Universe Entertainment
- Release date: 26 October 2017
- Running time: 98 minutes
- Country: Hong Kong
- Language: Cantonese
- Box office: US$7 million

Always Be With You is a 2017 Hong Kong supernatural horror film written and directed by Herman Yau. It is the twentieth and final instalment in the Troublesome Night film series and was produced specially to mark the 20th anniversary of the first film. The film stars Louis Koo, Julian Cheung, Gordon Lam, Charlene Choi, and Charmaine Sheh.

== Plot ==
David, a taxi driver with lung cancer, kills vacation property owner Patrick in a freak car accident. Off-duty police officer Sam, his wife Si and Sam's aunt seemingly were able to avoid the collision after Sam's aunt warned him to drive away from the road they were on. At the same time, Siu-hung, who broke up with her fiancé, committed suicide by jumping off a building, landing right on top of Patrick's car.

Chi-keung is a crematorium worker who is saddled with huge gambling debts. He steals a pair of pricey gold bracelets, the funerary objects of Siu-hung, to pay off his debts. Chi-keung fails to sell off the gold bracelets as the buyer was crushed by a concrete block while on his way to meet Chi-keung. Later, while crossing a street, a lorry loses control and veers into him and a couple who he recognises as Siu-hung's younger sister and brother in law. Chi-keung and Siu-hung's younger sister survives the accident. The bracelets which fell out while he was unconscious, were retrieved by the police as evidence.

Meanwhile, Patrick's fiancée, Yu Xin, after recovering from the tragedy, hopes to fulfil Patrick's last wish in running a suburban vacation house. However, a series of strange happenings keeps on occurring in the vacation house. Her first tenants, two lovers, commits suicide during their stay. Sam, accompanying Si, to investigate the scene, realises the presence of a disfigured female spirit. Later, David appears at the vacation home, offering to help Yu Xin. She at first declines but later, accepts him as a long term tenant.

Back home, Chi-keung is haunted by Siu-hung's ghost and at the same time, was visited by the loansharks whom he owes money. Chi-keung escapes through the window and ends up at Yu Xin's vacation home. He proceeds to commit suicide by gassing and suffocating himself, and is later discovered by David. The next morning, Yu Xin feels anxious as she has not seen her tenant, Chi-keung since the previous day. She decides to go to his room, worried that there may be another suicide. Accompanied by David, they both enter Chi-keung's rented room but discovered no one and Chi-keung's belongings gone. David tries to comfort Yu Xin and tells her he may have just ran off, not wanting to pay the rent.

Much later, a part of Chi-keung's dismembered body was discovered and Sam and Si once again makes a visit to Yu Xin's vacation home. They questioned David and Yu Xin about Chi-keung but both denied meeting him. Later that night, Sam spots Chi-keung's ghost and it is revealed that David got rid of Chi-keung's body but did not burn it according to Chi-keung's wishes left in a note. That same night, David gave himself up at a police station and commits suicide in his cell, leaving a note to Yu Xin explaining his terminal illness. After that, Sam discovers singer Jamie's vinyl, which Si got from a second hand shop, was haunted by her ghost. They decide to dispose it but it keeps appearing at Sam and Si's apartment after a few times. They eventually return it to the shop owner, who was Jamie's uncle and the vinyl, a personal gift from Jamie for him.

The next evening, Sam rhetorically asks Si what she'd do if he were to leave her. The question surprises and frightens Si as she had found his behaviour changed ever since the freak car accident as Sam was being especially sweet to her. She embraces him tightly and urges him to tell her what was happening. Sam notices two men approaching them, breaks from her embrace and runs off down the street. Si gives chase and points her gun to the two men dragging Sam away by his arms.

Sam then tells her that the two men are from the otherworld and he has been dead the three weeks since the night of the accident. That night, after avoiding the collision, Sam had gotten down from the car to report the crash. A passing car with the second hand shop owner and his wife in front and singer Jamie at the back spots the crash. Jamie, leaning out to capture the crash was hit by a lorry from the opposite direction. Her torso flies off from the impact, hitting Sam who falls and his skull pierced by a long, upright nail and dies on the spot. After Sam is dragged away, Si attempts to take her own life, resulting in her being hospitalized. Days later, as she recovers her mental and emotional stability in the hospital, Sam's spirit appears one last time, looking at her and waving goodbye before moving on.

== Cast ==
=== Starring ===
- Louis Koo as Sam
- Julian Cheung as David
- Gordon Lam as Chi-keung
- Charlene Choi as Yu-xin
- Charmaine Sheh as Si

=== Others ===
- Ava Yu as Siu-hung
- Bonnie Wong as Siu-hung's mother
- Wiyona Yeung as Siu-man
- Ben Yeung as Lam Pui
- Tony Ho as Agent Chiu
- Jamie Lee as Nancy
- Aaron Chow as Peter
- Pancy Chan as Miss Chan
- Brian Lee as Mysterious man
- Renci Yeung as Student

=== Special appearance ===
- Alex Lam as Patrick
- Heidi Lee as Jamie
- Lam Suet as Record owner
- Law Lan as Sam's aunt
- Kingdom Yuen as Record owner's wife

=== Guest appearance ===
- Ken Lo as Fung
- Elena Kong as Doctor Kong
- Cheung Tat-ming as Residential Guard
- Emily Kwan as Plastic surgeon
- Fire Lee as Man seeking haunted vacation mansion
- Terence Siufay as Man seeking haunted vacation mansion
