= Street of Fury =

1996 Hong Kong film by Billy Tang

- DVD cover
- Traditional Chinese: 龍虎砵蘭街
- Simplified Chinese: 龙虎砵兰街
- Hanyu Pinyin: Lóng Hǔ Bō Lán Jiē
- Jyutping: Lung4 Fu2 But3 Laan4 Gaai1
- Directed by: Billy Tang
- Written by: Lee Siu-kei; Frankie Ng Chi-Hung
- Produced by: Lee Siu-kei; Ang Liu
- Starring: Louis Koo; Michael Tse; Alan Chui Chung-San; Gigi Lai; Teresa Mak; Jerry Lamb
- Cinematography: Tony Miu
- Edited by: Robert Choi
- Music by: Jonathon Wong
- Production company: The Good Fellas Film
- Distributed by: The Good Fellas Film
- Release date: 24 August 1996
- Running time: 95 minutes
- Country: Hong Kong
- Language: Cantonese
- Box office: HK$6,361,905

Street of Fury is a 1996 Hong Kong crime film directed by Billy Tang and starring Louis Koo, Michael Tse, Gigi Lai, Teresa Mak and Jerry Lamb.

== Plot ==
The movie is about a few teenagers, Hu and Yu-long, continuously falling victim to the local gang and their leader.

After Hu's girlfriend gets raped by a few of the gang members, he joins the rivaling gang whose leader is Boss King, a psychopath and extremely cruel thug.

Quickly Hu climbs the authority chain as he starts cutting off the hands of his opponent which being the Top-Level rivaling thugs. While Yi is still recovering, Hu continuously mistreats her which leads to an intimate relationship between Yi and Hu's gang leader while Yu-long slowly gets closer to the more older lady Shan.

== Cast ==
- Louis Koo as Lung
- Michael Tse as Fu
- Gigi Lai as Yee
- Alan Chui Chung-San as Kwong Yan-fai
- Teresa Mak as Shan
- Jerry Lamb as Siu-cheung
- Simon Lui as "Short Sighted"
- Elvis Tsui as Chuen Wong
- Ben Lam as Kam Sau
- Wong Yat-fei as Fu's uncle
- Lo Fan as Fu's aunt
- Raven Choi as Gang member
- So Wai-nam
- Chow Mei-shing
- Mei Yee as Mahjong player
- Chan Po-chun as Brother Chun Chi
- Kong Foo-keung as Thug
- Anthony Carpio as Thug
- Hong Ping as Thug
- Jackson Ng as Fai's thug
- Sun Poon-chung as Assassin

== Production ==
Teresa Mak shaved her head for her role in the film.
