= The Masked Prosecutor =

1999 Hong Kong film by Herman Yau

- Film poster
- Traditional Chinese: 夜叉
- Simplified Chinese: 夜叉
- Hanyu Pinyin: Yè Chā
- Jyutping: Ye6 Caa1
- Directed by: Herman Yau
- Screenplay by: Lam Kee-to; Nam Yin
- Story by: Nam Yin
- Produced by: Nam Yin
- Starring: Louis Koo; Blackie Ko; Jordan Chan; Wayne Lai; Grace Yip; Frankie Ng
- Cinematography: Joe Chan
- Edited by: Chan Kei-hop
- Music by: Mak Chun Hung
- Production company: Proxious Entertainment Group
- Release date: 9 December 1999
- Running time: 93 minutes
- Country: Hong Kong
- Language: Cantonese
- Box office: HK$1,228,689

The Masked Prosecutor is a 1999 Hong Kong action film directed by Herman Yau and starring Louis Koo, Blackie Ko and Jordan Chan. Koo plays the title character, a vigilante who punishes criminals who escapes from justice.

== Plot ==
In Hong Kong, a vigilante known as the Masked Prosecutor have been punishing criminals who were sentenced not guilty by the court, which include a 15-year-old teenager (Lam Tsz-sin) who pushed a couple down the hill in a robbery but was proven to be psychopathic, Ng Mang (Frankie Ng), a triad leader involved in a gang negotiation in Temple Street which caused one killed and three injured but was released due to lack of evidence, and Leung Siu-chueng (Wayne Lai), director of Yun Man Industry Limited who was acquitted from a rape charge because the jury believed the accuser was having too much sex fantasies. The Masked Prosecutor's punishment involves forcing his detainees to listen to Hindu Buddhist chanting music, whipping them with a cane and tattooing a number on their arm for them to remember their chronological order of his being his detainee before tossing them outside the police station.

Officer Wah Kai-lun (Jordan Chan) was assigned to work on the case of the Masked Prosecutor with veteran officer Wan Ping-kai (Blackie Ko), known as Guy, who is six months away from retirement. Wah and Guy proceed to interrogate the three detainees in the hospital. Afterwards, Wah visits Guy's house and notices the lack of photographs present there. Guy's daughter, Siu-yu (Grace Yip) shows Wah a photo album with pictures of her family along with a picture of Guy with his godsons, Tong Hiu-tai (Louis Koo) and Wan Chi-nin (Michael Tse), who were also police officers and the trio were known as the Three Eagles of Mongkok. Wah takes the picture of the trio with him and tries to find clues while listening to the interrogations by the three detainees.

At this time, it is also reported that Kwong Cho-foon (Lo Mang), who was involved in a gold shop robbery two years ago where he also killed a man and crippling his daughter, have been acquitted of all charges. Wah plans to use Kwong to lure out the Masked Prosecutor. On the night of the operation, the Masked Prosecutor appears, attacking and attempts to abduct Kwong in a massage parlour before being interfered by Wah. The Masked Prosecutor gets into a scuffle with Wah where gains the upper and was about to shoot Wah before leaving the scene as uniformed officers arrive. Guy, who was slacking in a Cha chaan teng, also arrives and gets into an argument with Wah when the latter reveals that he suspect Guy is acquainted with the Masked Prosecutor, who Wah suspects to be Guy's godson, Hiu-tai.

Hiu-tai, who was once a police officer, was charged for manslaughter after killing a robber who surrendered. Because of this, Wah suspects Hiu-tai, but Guy refuses to believe Hiu-tai to be the Masked Prosecutor. Guy, who was present when Tong killed the robber, reveals the story: three years ago, Guy became sworn brothers and a godfather to Hiu-tai and Chi-nin. During that occasion, the trio were called upon for an operation to arrest drug dealers. A gunfight and chase ensues and two of the suspects were apprehended. While chasing down the final criminal, Hiu-tai mistakenly shoots and kills Chi-nin, which Guy was unaware of. Devastated, Hiu-tai kills the final suspect even the latter has surrendered. Guy has planned to quit the force if Hiu-tai loses his job, but refrains after realizing he would be missing out HK$1 million of pension after he retire. Therefore, Guy believes Hiu-tai resents him.

To continue on the investigation, Guy and Wah visit the Solvia-Pokka-Fuji Family Rehab Center, where Hiu-tai used to hang out with his girlfriend Ada (Jessica Hsuan), who was Chi-nin's older sister. There, they see Hiu-tai helping out an old lady before walking into a cha chaan teng. There, Wah straight up asks Hiu-tai whether he is the Masked Prosecutor, but the latter walks away without saying a word.

In the middle of night, Hiu-tai gives a call to Wah and tells him he plans to kill Kwong because of Wah's interference. Wah sends his subordinate to protect Kwong and stations him in a hotel room. Hiu-tai, disguised as a Buddhist monk, sneaks into the hotel and takes down Wah's subordinates before entering into Kwong's hotel room and killing him. Wah proceeds to chase Hiu-tai outside the streets and when he finally caught up, he points his gun at Hiu-tai. Hiu-tai ignores him and Wah fires a shot. As Wah walks over to cuff Hiu-tai, Guy appears and knocks Wah unconscious and drives Hiu-tai away from the scene. Guy urges Hiu-tai to stop what he is doing because it is illegal, but Hiu-tai refuses, stating he rather die than go to jail as he was tortured by criminals he helped incarcerate when he was in prison. Hiu-tai believes he is doing the right thing because the world is unfair that criminals can get away from the justice as long as they can afford to pay good lawyers. Hiu-tai also promises to leave Hong Kong and will only return after Guy retires.

The next day, Guy was arrested by the Internal Affairs for assaulting Wah and helping Hiu-tai escape. When Hiu-tai was about to leave Hong Kong, he hears about Guy's arrest on the news, he gives a call to Wah, accusing Wah of pushing a cop to hell since Guy would either be killed or commit suicide if he will be imprisoned. Hiu-tai also threatens to kill Wah if Guy goes to jail. As Guy is being escorted to prison, Guy kills several police officers and attempts to free Guy. Also, it turns out to a scheme set up by Wah. As Hiu-fai flees, Wah gives chase, from a foot chase leading to a car chase until Hiu-fai's car explodes after running into another car. Hiu-tai narrowly escapes the explosion and gets into a brief scuffle with Wah and manages to snatch the latter's pistol. The police arrives and Hiu-tai hold Wah hostage. Eventually, Hiu-tai empties the pistol and pushes Wah away, pretending to fire at the cops.

In the end, Hiu-tai'a ashes were taken by Guy and placed them next to Chi-nin's at the temple, where Guy, Wah and Siu-yu pay their respects. It is also revealed that Wah changed his testimony so Guy would not end up in prison. There, they encounter Ada, who has become a nun.

== Cast ==
- Louis Koo as Tong Hiu-tai / The Masked Prosecutor
- Blackie Ko as Wan Ping-kai / Guy
- Jordan Chan as Wah Kai-lun
- Wayne Lai as Leung Siu-chung
- Grace Yip as Wan Siu-yu
- Frankie Ng as Ng Mang
- Michael Tse as Wan Chi-nin (Guest appearance)
- Jessica Hsuan as Ada Wan Chi-ha (Guest appearance)
- Lo Mang as Kwong Cho-foon (Guest appearance)
- Lam Tsz-sin as Teenager acquitted of robbery
- Tony Ho as Robber killed by Tai
- Man Sai as CID
- Raymond Leung as Superintendent Wong
- Lee Kim-wing as Bodyguard

== Theme song ==
- Tender Bad Man (溫柔壊男人)
  - Composer: Jay Chou, Jacky Wu
  - Lyricist: Jacky Wu
  - Singer: Blackie Ko

== Reception ==
=== Critical ===
Andrew Saroch of Far East Films gave the film a score of 3 out of 5 stars and praises the film's premise, director Herman Yau's execution and the performance by the cast, but criticizes the pacing after the first hour. Kenneth Brorsson of So Good Reviews praises the film's scharacters and the chemistry of the cast but notes the script as being weak. LoveHKFilm gave the film a positive review praising Louis Koo's intensity in his performance and calls the film "reasonably interesting and entertaining." Hong Kong Film Net gave the film a score of 5/10 and criticizes the film's uneven tone, plot holes and hollow characters.

=== Box office ===
The film grossed HK$1,228,689 at the Hong Kong box office during its theatrical run from 9 to 24 December 1999.
