= Troublesome Night 18 =

2003 Hong Kong-Chinese film by Jameson Lam

- DVD cover
- Traditional Chinese: 陰陽路十八之鬼上身
- Simplified Chinese: 阴阳路十八之鬼上身
- Hanyu Pinyin: Yīn Yáng Lù Shí Bā Zhī Guǐ Shàng Shēn
- Jyutping: Jam1 Joeng4 Lou6 Sap6 Baat3 Zi1 Gwai2 Soeng5 San1
- Directed by: Jameson Lam
- Written by: Jameson Lam
- Produced by: Shing Chiu-kei
- Cinematography: Tong Kam-ho; Yau Wing-yung
- Edited by: Jacky Leung
- Music by: Mak Chun Hung
- Production companies: Nam Yin Production Co., Ltd. East Entertainment Limited; B&S Limited
- Distributed by: B&S Films Distribution Company Limited
- Release date: 27 February 2003
- Running time: 90 minutes
- Countries: Hong Kong; China
- Language: Cantonese

Troublesome Night 18 (Chinese: 陰陽路十八之鬼上身; lit. 'Yin Yang Road Eighteen: Possessed by a Ghost') is a 2003 comedy horror film produced by Nam Yin and directed by Jameson Lam. It is the 18th of the 20 films in the Troublesome Night film series, and the eleventh of the Buds timeline.

== Plot ==
Kong Lik-son was born with the ability to see ghosts and spirits. One day, he sees a restless soul, Mrs Chung, who is looking for a human replacement. Kong provokes Chung because he spoils her plan when he saves Ying-ying, and she keeps haunting him. Kong goes to find Mrs Bud Lung to help him, and she tells him that he had disrupted the balance of Yin and Yang when he saved Ying-ying's life. Mrs Chung had drowned during her pregnancy and she needs to find a human body for her unborn son to possess and be reborn. Mrs Bud asks Bud Gay and Ying-ying to bring Mrs Chung to the lakeside and wait for transmigrants.

== Cast ==
- Law Lan as Mrs. Bud Lung
- Michael Tong as Kong Lik-son
- Simon Lui as Bud Pit
- Yum Kong-sau as Ying-ying
- Frankie Ng as Brother Chi-hung
- Anita Chan as Audrey
- Baat Leung-gam as Eight
- Tong Ka-fai as Bud Gay
- Ronnie Cheung as Bud Yan
- Kitty Chung as Cheung Kit-see
- Big Cheong as Chiu
- Jass Chan as Fai
- Wong Koon-chen as Chung
