= Conspiracy (2000 film) =

2000 Hong Kong film by Shu-Pui Hou

- Traditional Chinese: 赤裸紅唇
- Simplified Chinese: 赤裸红唇
- Hanyu Pinyin: Chìluǒ Hóngchún
- Directed by: Shu-Pui Hou
- Produced by: Chun Fai Lau
- Starring: Bessie Chan; Simon Lui; Michael Tse; Sophie Ngan; Peter Lai; Gai-keung Si
- Cinematography: Pak Hung Chim
- Edited by: Luo Jinghui
- Music by: Peng Yuehui
- Production companies: Sanbao Film Studio; Universe Film Distribution Co. Ltd; Zongheng Production Co. Ltd.
- Distributed by: Universe Film Distribution Co. Ltd
- Release date: 6 July 2000 (Hong Kong)
- Running time: 87 minutes
- Country: Hong Kong
- Languages: Mandarin; Cantonese
- Box office: HK$17,250

Conspiracy is a 2000 Hong Kong sex film directed by Shu-Pui Hou and produced by Chun Fai Lau, starring Bessie Chan, Simon Lui, Michael Tse, Sophie Ngan, Peter Lai, and Gai-keung Si. The film premiered in Hong Kong on 6 July 2000.

== Cast ==
- Bessie Chan as Maggie To.
- Simon Lui as Ken Chow.
- Michael Tse as Andy Yeung.
- Sophie Ngan as Sharon Li.
- Peter Lai as Police chief.
- Gai-keung Si as Policeman.
- Tao Chiang as Sam Tsu.
- Feng Ku as Wilson Koo.

== Release ==
It was released in Hong Kong on 6 July 2000, and grossed HK$17,250.
