= Headlines (2001 film) =

2001 Hong Kong film by Leo Heung

- Film poster
- Traditional Chinese: 頭號人物
- Simplified Chinese: 头号人物
- Hanyu Pinyin: Toū Hào Rén Wù
- Jyutping: Tau4 Hou6 Jan4 Mat6
- Directed by: Leo Heung
- Written by: So Man-sing; Yu Wing-chuen; Fan Yau-man
- Produced by: Nam Yin; David Lam
- Starring: Emil Chau; Maggie Cheung Ho-yee; Daniel Wu; Grace Yip; Wayne Lai
- Cinematography: Ross Clarkson
- Edited by: Chan Kei-hop
- Music by: Mak Chun Hung
- Production companies: Nam Yin Production; Sundy Production
- Distributed by: China Star Entertainment Group
- Release date: 11 January 2001
- Running time: 88 minutes
- Country: Hong Kong
- Language: Cantonese

Headlines is a 2001 Hong Kong comedy-drama film directed by Leo Heung and starring Emil Chau, Maggie Cheung Ho-yee, Daniel Wu, Grace Yip and Wayne Lai. This film revolves around the Hong Kong press.

== Plot ==
Headlines tells the story of three reporters. Peter Wong (Daniel Wu), make his best efforts to overcome his lack of experience, he tracks down a story involving a young girl (Grace Yip) who is raising her two brothers on her own... Joey (Maggie Cheung) willing to overcome the difficulties of her job, end up she gets involved with a young triad Ho Wai-keung (Oscar Leung) while trying to write a story about him... Sorrow Chan (Emil Chau), a veteran reporter investigates a jewel robbery that involves one of his policeman friends, officer Mak Chun-hang (Wayne Lai)... The three reporters encounter situations which cause them to reevaluate their professions.

== Cast and roles ==
- Emil Chau as Sorrow Chan
- Maggie Cheung Ho-yee as Joey
- Daniel Wu as Peter Wong
- Grace Yip as Yuen Chi-wai
- Wayne Lai as Officer Mak Chun-hang
- Oscar Leung as Ho Wai-keung
- Simon Lui as Yang
- Rainbow Ching as Miss Wong
- Benny Li as Ben Wong
- Lee Wai-kei as Kwok
- David Lam as Elvis Mok
- Michael Tsui as Ricky Chan
- Eddie Chan as Mr. Light
- Hui Fan as Keung's granny
- Tam Kon-chung as Bodyguard
