= Troublesome Night 19 =

2003 Hong Kong-Chinese film by Yip Wai-ying

- DVD cover
- Traditional Chinese: 陰陽路十九之我對眼見到嘢
- Simplified Chinese: 阴阳路十九之我对眼见到嘢
- Hanyu Pinyin: Yīn Yáng Lù Shí Jǐu Zhī Wǒ Duì Yǎn Jiàn Dào Yě
- Jyutping: Jam1 Joeng4 Lou6 Sap6 Gau2 Zi1 Ngo5 Deoi3 Ngaan5 Gin3 Dou3 Je5
- Directed by: Yip Wai-ying
- Written by: Jameson Lam
- Produced by: Nam Yin
- Cinematography: Mike Pang; Lum Lai-shing; Wong Chun-mo
- Edited by: Jacky Leung
- Music by: Mak Chun Hung
- Production companies: Nam Yin Production Co., Ltd. B&S Limited
- Distributed by: B&S Films Distribution Company Limited
- Release date: 19 June 2003
- Running time: 90 minutes
- Countries: Hong Kong; China
- Language: Cantonese

Troublesome Night 19 (Chinese: 陰陽路十九之我對眼見到嘢; lit. 'Yin Yang Road Nineteen: I Saw It with My Own Eyes') is a 2003 comedy horror film produced by Nam Yin and directed by Yip Wai-ying. It is the 19th installment in the Troublesome Night film series, and the twelfth and final film of the Buds timeline.

== Plot ==
Audrey finds a pair of sunglasses at the beach. That night, she dreams about a girl who was murdered on the beach. After consulting the expert ghostbuster Mrs. Bud Lung, Audrey learns that the ghost wants to tell her about her fate. Mrs. Bud urges Audrey to return the sunglasses back to where she found them. She becomes unconscious and experiences a vision of the entire murder. While having dinner later, Audrey recognises Lee Ka-hing, a famous tycoon, as the murderer. She allows the victim's ghost to possess her and force Lee to confess.

== Cast ==
- Law Lan as Mrs. Bud Lung
- Simon Lui as Bud Pit
- Anita Chan as Audrey
- Ronnie Cheung as Bud Yan
- Ken Wong as Lee Ka-hing
- Yum Kong-sau as mysterious woman
- Tong Ka-fai as Bud Gay
- Lam Wai-yin as man inflating rubber boat
- Michelle Wong as Wan
- Baat Leung-gam as Pat
- Mr Nine as Lai Chor-kau
- Onitsuka as Lai Chor-pat
