= Gong Tau: An Oriental Black Magic =

2007 Hong Kong film by Herman Yau

- Film poster
- Directed by: Herman Yau
- Written by: Herman Yau; Lam Chun-Yue
- Produced by: Charles Heung
- Cinematography: Joe Chan
- Edited by: Azrael Chung
- Music by: Mak Chun Hung
- Production company: China Star Entertainment Group
- Release date: 10 May 2007
- Running time: 97 minutes
- Country: Hong Kong
- Language: Cantonese

Gong Tau: An Oriental Black Magic (Cantonese: 降頭, Gong Tau) is a 2007 Hong Kong horror film directed by Herman Yau.

== Plot ==
CID detective Rockman was sent to Thailand to investigate a case involving the Hong Kong and Thai underground syndicate. During his visit, he meets a sexy table dancer called Elli, and they had a brief but hot, steamy affair. Unexpectedly, Rockman is ordered to return to Hong Kong. Before leaving, he promised Elli he would return, but he never does. Heart broken, Elli felt she was deceived. Rockman never expect his affair would bring the worst luck for him and his family.

Three years later, in Hong Kong, when Rockman was busily investigating a murder case one stormy night, a senior policeman was murdered by a most wanted fugitive Lam Chiu. On the other hand, Rockman's wife broke down after their son died mysteriously. All the major newspapers headlined the two cases, saying the murder and the baby's death were related. Frustrated, Rockman worked closely with Brother Sum well seasoned detective...
