= Troublesome Night 4 =

1998 Hong Kong film by Herman Yau

- Theatrical release poster

Chinese name
- Traditional Chinese: 陰陽路4與鬼同行
- Simplified Chinese: 阴阳路4与鬼同行
Transcriptions
Standard Mandarin
- Hanyu Pinyin: Yīn Yáng Lù Sì Yú Guǐ Tóng Xíng
Yue: Cantonese
- Jyutping: Jam1 Joeng4 Lou6 Sei3 Jyu4 Gwai2 Tung4 Hang4
- Directed by: Herman Yau
- Written by: Kenneth Lau; Chang Kwok-tse
- Produced by: Nam Yin
- Cinematography: Joe Chan
- Edited by: Tony Chow
- Music by: Mak Chun Hung
- Production companies: Mandarin Films Ltd. Nam Yin Production Co., Ltd.
- Distributed by: Mandarin Films Distribution Co., Ltd.
- Release date: 25 August 1998
- Running time: 97 minutes
- Countries: Hong Kong; Philippines
- Languages: Cantonese; English; Filipino

Troublesome Night 4 (Chinese: 陰陽路4與鬼同行; lit. 'Yin Yang Road 4 Walking with Ghosts') is a 1998 comedy horror film produced by Nam Yin and directed by Herman Yau. It is the fourth of the 20 films in the Troublesome Night film series.

== Plot ==
The film contains four short stories loosely linked together. A group of Hong Kong tourists visit the Philippines and encounter paranormal events.

== Cast ==
- Louis Koo as Wing
- Pauline Suen as Apple
- Simon Lui as Leonardo
- Cheung Tat-ming as DiCaprio
- Marianne Chan as U2
- Wayne Lai as Lewinsky
- Emily Kwan as tour guide
- Timmy Hung as Alan Hung
- Karen Tong as Mr Wong's secretary
- Joey Choi as K2
- Raymond Wong as Mr. Wong
- Via Veloso as Leah Lucindo
- Anthony Cortez as Mario
- Herman Yau as John
