= The Sleep Curse =

2017 Hong Kong film by Herman Yau

- Film poster
- Directed by: Herman Yau
- Screenplay by: Erica Li; Eric Lee
- Produced by: Albert Lee; Jason Siu; Yao Qinyi
- Starring: Anthony Wong; Michelle Wai; Jojo Goh; Gordon Lam; Bryant Mak
- Cinematography: Joe Chan
- Edited by: Azrael Chung
- Music by: Mak Chun Hung
- Production companies: Emperor Film Production Limited; Stellar Mega Films Limited
- Release dates: 2017 (HKIFF); 18 May 2017 (Hong Kong)
- Running time: 102 minutes
- Languages: Cantonese; Japanese; Malay

The Sleep Curse is a 2017 Hong Kong horror film directed by Herman Yau and starring Anthony Wong. Wong announced that The Sleep Curse would be his last performance in horror and thriller films, stating he no longer enjoyed making them.

== Plot ==
The film alternates between the years 1942 and 1990, between a family, with neuroscientist Lam Sik-ka, and his father Lam Sing, who was a translator for the Japanese occupational forces in Hong Kong. Sing has hidden the fact that in his past, he did not save a comfort woman from persecution by the occupiers. Sik-ka later learns that his father's death was caused by a curse the woman placed on him, and that the curse will eventually haunt him as well.

== Themes ==
At the Far East Film Festival in Udine, Erica Li spoke about the themes of the film, stating that the film was to "speak for the women, [...] Especially for those who cannot speak for themselves, like the victims of the war. This topic was trying to tell the world that some justice is still undone."

== Release ==
The Sleep Curse had its premiere at the Hong Kong International Film Festival in 2017. It had a wide release in Hong Kong on May 18, 2017.

== Reception ==
The Hollywood Reporter compared the film to director Herman Yau and Anthony Wong's previous collaborations The Untold Story and Ebola Syndrome, stating that "There may be no way for the film's director and star to regenerate the manic energy and social fury that made The Untold Story and The Ebola Syndrome [sic] such genre-benders more than two decades ago." noting Wong strives for depth in the role, while Yau "struggles to rein in all the sprawling elements — the nondimensional characters, the visceral violence, Brother Hung's bombastic music — into a tight, coherent movie." The South China Morning Post gave the film a two and a half star rating out of five, noting the screenwriters placed "excessively long flashbacks to explain the origin of the curse" and that "The film only snaps back to life with an avalanche of decapitation, mutilation and cannibalism in its last reel. For those expecting a gory good time throughout, as in Yau’s extreme horror classics from the ’90s, that is too little, too late."
