= Mak Chun Hung =

Hong Kong composer

Mak Chun Hung (Chinese: 麥振鴻), also known as Brother Hung, is a Hong Kong composer who wrote the original score for hundreds of films and TV series in Hong Kong, mainland China, and Taiwan.

== Filmography ==
=== Films (incomplete) ===
- Burning Paradise (1994)
- Ancient Chinese Whorehouse (1994)
- Drunken Master III (1994)
- Legendary Couple (1995)
- Ebola Syndrome (1996)
- All of a Sudden (1996)
- 97 Aces Go Places (1997)
- Up for the Rising Sun (1997)
- Troublesome Night (1997)
- Troublesome Night 2 (1997)
- Troublesome Night 3 (1998)
- Troublesome Night 4 (1998)
- Fascination Amour (1999)
- Troublesome Night 5 (1999)
- Troublesome Night 6 (1999)
- Troublesome Night 7 (2000)
- Troublesome Night 8 (2000)
- I.Q. Dudettes (2000)
- Troublesome Night 9 (2001)
- Troublesome Night 10 (2001)
- Troublesome Night 11 (2001)
- Troublesome Night 12 (2001)
- Headlines (2001)
- Prison on Fire – Life Sentence (2001)
- The Hidden Enforcers (2002)
- Happy Family (2002)
- A Wicked Ghost III: The Possession (2002)
- Troublesome Night 13 (2002)
- Troublesome Night 14 (2002)
- Troublesome Night 15 (2002)
- Troublesome Night 16 (2002)
- Troublesome Night 17 (2002)
- Troublesome Night 18 (2003)
- Troublesome Night 19 (2003)
- The Secret Society - Boss (2003)
- Man in Blues (2003)
- Osaka Wrestling Restaurant (2004)
- Shaolin vs. Evil Dead (2004)
- Everlasting Regret (2005)
- The Ghost Inside (2005)
- Cocktail (2006)
- Whispers and Moans (2007)
- Gong Tau: An Oriental Black Magic (2007)
- True Women for Sale (2008)
- The First 7th Night (2009)
- Turning Point (2009)
- Coweb (2009)
- Break Up Club (2010)
- All's Well, Ends Well 2010 (2010)
- Perfect Wedding (2010)
- The Legend Is Born: Ip Man (2010)
- The Woman Knight of Mirror Lake (2011)
- Turning Point 2 (2011)
- Love Lifting (2012)
- Ip Man: The Final Fight (2013)
- Gangster Payday (2014)
- Kung Fu Angels (2014)
- Sara (2015)
- An Inspector Calls (2015)
- The Mobfathers (2016)
- Nessun Dorma (2016)
- Shock Wave (2017)
- The Sleep Curse (2017)
- 77 Heartbreaks (2017)
- Always Be with You (2017)

=== TV series (incomplete) ===
- The Legendary Siblings (1999)
- Crouching Tiger, Hidden Dragon (2001)
- Legendary Fighter: Yang's Heroine (2001)
- Lavender (2002)
- The Young Wong Fei Hung (2002)
- My Fair Princess III (2003)
- The Royal Swordsmen (2005)
- Chinese Paladin (2005)
- The Proud Twins (2005)
- The Little Fairy (2006)
- The Young Warriors (2006)
- The Fairies of Liaozhai (2007)
- Chinese Paladin 3 (2009)
- A Weaver on the Horizon (2010)
- Swords of Legends (2014)
- Legend of Fragrance (2015)
- The Lost Tomb (2015)
- The Journey of Flower (2015)
- The Mystic Nine (2016)
- Let's Shake It (2017)
- The Legend of Dugu (2017)
- The Destiny of White Snake (2018)

== Awards ==
30th Hong Kong Film Awards

- Nominated, Hong Kong Film Award for Best Original Film Score (for Break Up Club)
