= Troublesome Night 5 =

1999 Hong Kong film by Herman Yau

- Film poster

Chinese name
- Traditional Chinese: 陰陽路五之一見發財
- Simplified Chinese: 阴阳路五之一见发财
Transcriptions
Standard Mandarin
- Hanyu Pinyin: Yīn Yáng Lù Wǔ Zhī Yī Jiàn Fā Cái
Yue: Cantonese
- Jyutping: Jam1 Joeng4 Lou6 Ng5 Zi1 Jat1 Gin3 Faat3 Coi4
- Directed by: Herman Yau
- Written by: Kenneth Lau; Chang Kwok-tse
- Produced by: Nam Yin
- Cinematography: Joe Chan
- Edited by: Tony Chow
- Music by: Mak Chun Hung
- Production companies: B&S Limited; Nam Yin Production Co., Ltd.
- Release date: 22 January 1999
- Running time: 89 minutes
- Country: Hong Kong
- Language: Cantonese

Troublesome Night 5 (Chinese: 陰陽路五之一見發財; lit. 'Yin Yang Road Five: Luck at First Sight') is a 1999 Hong Kong comedy horror film produced by Nam Yin and directed by Herman Yau. It is the fifth of the 20 films in the Troublesome Night film series.

== Plot ==
This film contains three loosely connected segments.

In the first segment, Cheung, a night shift taxi driver, picks up five different passengers on the same night: an injured triad boss, a woman pretending to be a ghost, a mysterious old woman, an edgy woman, and the ghost of a traffic policeman.

In the second segment, Cheung's friend, Fat, moves to a new apartment with his wife and son. He gambles compulsively despite being already heavily in debt. One night, after discovering that his new home is haunted, he makes a deal with the ghost to help him win every time he gambles. In return, he will share half of everything he has with the ghost. He soon regrets the deal, but it is too late. The ghost wants him to share not only his fortune, but also his wife, and even the number of years he is destined to live. Left with no choice, his wife and son abandon him. Fat commits suicide by setting himself on fire.

In the third segment, Fat's son, On, has grown up while Cheung has quit driving and started a private security company. Cheung hires On and assigns him to the night shift in an office building. One night, On and two colleagues encounter a ghostly old woman and end up on a non-existent 14th floor. While escaping from the building, On has a vision of the haunted apartment he lived in when he was a boy. When his mother learns about the incident, she wants to accompany the three of them while they reenact their escape, so that she can meet her husband's spirit. Their attempt is successful; Fat's spirit reunites with his family, who forgive him, and he departs in peace. On also becomes more mature and sensible after the encounter.

== Cast ==
- Louis Koo as Fat
- Simon Lui as Cheung
- Law Lan as old woman
- Wayne Lai as Sing
- Frankie Ng as Wah
- Chin Kar-lok as Big B
- Perrie Lai as Big B's girlfriend
- Amanda Lee as Fat's wife
- John Tang as On (Fat's son)
- Natalie Wong as edgy woman
- Ben Ng as ghost in apartment
- Emily Kwan as fake ghost
- Lee Kin-yan as traffic policeman
- Mok Wai-man as security guard
