= Troublesome Night 15 =

2002 Hong Kong film by Jamie Luk

- Film poster
- Traditional Chinese: 陰陽路十五之客似魂來
- Simplified Chinese: 阴阳路十五之客似魂来
- Hanyu Pinyin: Yīn Yáng Lù Shí Wǔ Zhī Kè Sì Hún Lái
- Jyutping: Jam1 Joeng4 Lou6 Sap6 Ng5 Zi1 Haak3 Ci5 Wan4 Loi4
- Directed by: Jamie Luk
- Written by: Yee Yan
- Produced by: Nam Yin
- Cinematography: Chan Yiu-ming; Yip Siu-ching; Lum Lai-shing; Mike Pang
- Edited by: Jacky Leung
- Music by: Mak Chun Hung
- Production companies: Nam Yin Production Co., Ltd. East Entertainment Limited; B&S Limited
- Distributed by: B&S Films Distribution Company Limited
- Release date: 4 July 2002
- Running time: 95 minutes
- Country: Hong Kong
- Language: Cantonese

Troublesome Night 15 (Chinese: 陰陽路十五之客似魂來; lit. 'Yin Yang Road Fifteen: Guests Come As Souls') is a 2002 Hong Kong comedy horror film produced by Nam Yin and directed by Jamie Luk. It is the 15th of the 20 films in the Troublesome Night film series, and the eighth of the Buds timeline.

== Plot ==
Ngau's grandfather was a hanjian during the Second Sino-Japanese War; he murdered Keung and Keung's family. Keung became a vengeful ghost after death, seeking revenge on the Ngau family.

Ngau's wife was killed by Keung's ghost shortly after giving birth to their son, Fai. Ngau is afraid of losing Fai so he asks Mrs Bud Lung, a ghostbuster, to help him. She suggests that he operates a food stall at night to attract some ghost patrons and ask them to protect his family from Keung.

When Fai grows up, he gets seduced by Sally, who tries to trick him into selling his father's land. If the land is sold, Ngau will lose ownership of the food stall and the ghost patrons can no longer protect his family.

Fai knocks his father unconscious, steals his seal and signs a contract with Sally to sell the land – only to realise that she has deceived him. Although Ngau's friends manage to destroy the contract later, it is too late as Keung has already caused Fai to die in a car accident.

Out of love for his son, Ngau sacrifices himself to appease Keung, and Fai is brought back to life. In memory of his father, Fai and his wife continue to operate the food stall to serve ghost patrons.

== Cast ==
- Eric Tsang as Ngau
- Edmond Leung as Fai
- Law Lan as Mrs. Bud Lung
- Iris Wong as Sally Li
- Benny Lai as Keung
- Kei-kei as Fa
- Tong Ka-fai as Bud Gay
- Ronnie Cheung as Bud Yan
- Anita Chan as Audrey
- Mr Nine as Lai Chor-kau
- Onitsuka as Lai Chor-pat
- Ricky Yi as Sally's boyfriend
- Kitty Chung as Ngau's wife
- Benny Law as friendly ghost
- Tam Kon-chung as gangster
- Jeff Kam as Japanese soldier
- Big Cheong as taxi driver
- Lee Ting-fung as Fai (young)
