= Troublesome Night 9 =

2001 Hong Kong film by Ivan Lai

- Film poster
- Traditional Chinese: 陰陽路九之命轉乾坤
- Simplified Chinese: 阴阳路九之命转乾坤
- Hanyu Pinyin: Yīn Yáng Lù Jǐu Zhī Mìng Zhuǎn Qián Kūn
- Jyutping: Jam1 Joeng4 Lou6 Gau2 Zi1 Meng6 Zyun2 Kin4 Kwan1
- Directed by: Ivan Lai
- Written by: Leung Po-on; Rex Hon
- Produced by: Nam Yin
- Cinematography: Paul Yip
- Edited by: Eric Cheung
- Music by: Mak Chun Hung
- Production companies: Nam Yin Production Co., Ltd. East Entertainment Limited; B&S Limited
- Distributed by: B&S Films Distribution Company Limited
- Release date: 11 January 2001
- Running time: 90 minutes
- Country: Hong Kong
- Language: Cantonese
- Box office: HK$31,310

Troublesome Night 9 (Chinese: 陰陽路九之命轉乾坤; lit. 'Yin Yang Road Nine: Fate Changes the Universe') is a 2001 Hong Kong comedy horror film produced by Nam Yin and directed by Ivan Lai. It is the ninth of the 20 films in the Troublesome Night film series, and the second of the Buds timeline.

== Plot ==
Ms. Liu, a compulsive gambler, meets Bud Pit on a cruise ship. When he tries to help her win, his girlfriend, Moon, becomes unhappy because Ms Liu has been neglecting her dying grandmother. Later, she visits Bud Pit's mother, the expert ghostbuster Mrs Bud Lung. When she asks Mrs Bud Lung to bless her so that she will win every time she gambles, Mrs Bud Lung tells her to clean up her parents' graves instead. She removes the weeds from her parents' graves and puts the rubbish on nearby graves. The angry spirits of the dead come to haunt her.

== Cast ==
- Simon Lui as Bud Pit
- Law Lan as Mrs. Bud Lung
- Maggie Cheung Ho-yee as Ms. Liu
- Halina Tam as Moon
- Mr Nine as Kau
- Onitsuka as Baat
- Cheng Chu-fung as cruise ship manager
- Sherming Yiu as gambler on cruise ship
- Wayne Lai as gambler on cruise ship
- Tong Ka-fai as Bud Gay
- Jameson Lam as gambler in Ms. Liu's dream
- Ho Chung-wai as Jason
- Hui Pik-kei as nurse
