= Troublesome Night 12 =

2001 Hong Kong film by Yip Wai-ying

- DVD cover
- Traditional Chinese: 陰陽路十二之美容屍
- Simplified Chinese: 阴阳路十二之美容尸
- Hanyu Pinyin: Yīn Yáng Lù Shí Èr Zhī Měi Róng Shī
- Jyutping: Jam1 Joeng4 Lou6 Sap6 Ji6 Zi1 Mei5 Jung4 Si1
- Directed by: Yip Wai-ying
- Written by: Jameson Lam; Leung Po-on
- Produced by: Nam Yin
- Cinematography: Chan Yiu-ming
- Music by: Mak Chun Hung
- Production companies: Nam Yin Production Co., Ltd. East Entertainment Limited; B&S Limited
- Distributed by: B&S Films Distribution Company Limited
- Release date: August 2001
- Running time: 90 minutes
- Countries: Hong Kong; China
- Language: Cantonese
- Box office: HK$24,840

Troublesome Night 12 (Chinese: 陰陽路十二之美容屍; lit. 'Yin Yang Road Twelve: Beauty Corpse') is a 2001 comedy horror film produced by Nam Yin and directed by Yip Wai-ying. It is the 12th of the 20 films in the Troublesome Night film series, and the fifth of the Buds timeline.

== Plot ==
Sun and Aki, two beauty consultants from Hong Kong, accept an offer to work at their company's new branch in Shenzhen. Their initial excitement turns into horror when they learn that their boss had tricked them. Their accommodation is a cheap hotel room rather than a new house, while the new branch has only one staff, Yee. That night, Aki's boyfriend, Bud Gay, brings the three of them to a disco run by his friends, the Lai brothers. With help from the Lai brothers, Bud Gay and his cousin Bud Yan, they distribute flyers to attract customers to their branch.

One evening, a strange man called Mr Cheng shows up and requests their services for his wife. He wants them to go to his home because it is inconvenient for his wife to travel. Sun follows him home and promises to heal Mrs Cheng's face after accepting a large sum of money from them. She does not know that the Cheng couple and their housekeeper are actually ghosts. When she tries to stop after the first session, she gets possessed by Mrs Cheng's ghost, who forces her to return and fulfil her end of the bargain. Aki notices that Sun is behaving strangely and learns from Yee that Sun is possessed.

In the meantime, Bud Yan reveals to the Lai brothers that their disco has attracted a large number of ghost patrons because they have unknowingly opened their disco during the Hungry Ghost Festival. They seek help from Bud Gay's mother, ghostbuster Mrs Bud Lung, to "cleanse" the disco and save Sun from the Cheng couple.

== Cast ==
- Law Lan as Mrs. Bud Lung
- Angie Cheung as Sun
- May Kwong as Aki
- Benny Lai as Mr. Cheng
- Tong Ka-fai as Bud Gay
- Ronnie Cheung as Bud Yan
- Mr Nine as Lai Chor-kau
- Onitsuka as Lai Chor-pat
- Cheung Chi as Mrs. Cheng
- Ann Ho as Cheung Man-yee
- Alson Wong as Tony Chiu
