= Kung Fu Angels =

2014 Hong Kong-Chinese film by Herman Yau

- Film poster
- Directed by: Herman Yau
- Written by: Edmond Wong
- Produced by: John Chong
- Starring: Karena Ng; Jeremy Tsui; Janelle Sing; Alex Lam; Zhang Chuchu
- Release dates: 4 December 2014 (Hong Kong); 11 December 2014 (China)
- Running time: 87 minutes
- Countries: Hong Kong; China
- Languages: Mandarin; Cantonese
- Box office: ¥0.32 million (China)

Kung Fu Angels (Chinese: 青春鬥) is a 2014 romantic comedy film directed by Herman Yau. A Hong Kong-Chinese co-production, it was released on December 4 in Hong Kong and on December 11 in China.

== Cast ==
- Karena Ng
- Jeremy Tsui
- Janelle Sing
- Alex Lam
- Zhang Chuchu
- Tats Lau
- Johnson Yuen Tak Cheong
- Song Jia
- Raymond Wong

== Box office ==
By 12 December 2014, the film had earned ¥0.32 million at the Chinese box office.
