= Troublesome Night 11 =

2001 Hong Kong film by Yeung Wan-king

- DVD cover
- Traditional Chinese: 陰陽路十一之撩鬼條命
- Simplified Chinese: 阴阳路十一之撩鬼条命
- Hanyu Pinyin: Yīn Yáng Lù Shí Yī Zhī Liào Guǐ Tiáo Mìng
- Jyutping: Jam1 Joeng4 Lou6 Sap6 Jat1 Zi1 Liu4 Gwai2 Tiu4 Meng6
- Directed by: Yeung Wan-king
- Written by: Jameson Lam
- Produced by: Nam Yin
- Cinematography: Joe Chan
- Edited by: Eric Cheung
- Music by: Mak Chun Hung
- Production companies: Nam Yin Production Co., Ltd. East Entertainment Limited; B&S Limited
- Distributed by: B&S Films Distribution Company Limited
- Release date: April 2001
- Running time: 90 minutes
- Country: Hong Kong
- Language: Cantonese
- Box office: HK$21,525

Troublesome Night 11 (Chinese: 陰陽路十一之撩鬼條命; lit. 'Yin Yang Road Eleven: Flirting with Ghosts') is a 2001 Hong Kong comedy horror film produced by Nam Yin and directed by Yeung Wan-king. It is the 11th of the 20 films in the Troublesome Night film series, and the fourth of the Buds timeline.

== Plot ==
A hustler tricks a restaurateur into lending him HK$2 million, drugs her, brings her to a deserted beach and kills her. A group of friends doing voluntary work at the beach discover the corpse and call the police, but the body had disappeared when they come back. The vengeful spirit of the restaurateur possesses the other girls and returns to take her revenge on the hustler.

== Cast ==
- Law Lan as Mrs. Bud Lung
- Halina Tam as Moon
- David Lee as Tom
- Tong Ka-fai as Bud Gay
- Ronnie Cheung as Bud Yan
- Teresa Mak as Lau Sau-wan
- Bessie Chan as Eva Chan
- Vivian Lok as Jenny
- Onitsuka as Lai Chor-pat
- Mr Nine as Lai Chor-kau
- Jameson Lam as Tom's master
- Jeff Kam as Jeffrey
