= Troublesome Night 8 =

2000 Hong Kong film by Edmond Yuen

- Film poster
- Traditional Chinese: 陰陽路八之棺材仔
- Simplified Chinese: 阴阳路八之棺材仔
- Hanyu Pinyin: Yīn Yáng Lù Bā Zhī Guān Cái Zǎi
- Jyutping: Jam1 Joeng4 Lou6 Baat3 Zi1 Gun1 Coi4 Zai2
- Directed by: Edmond Yuen
- Written by: Jameson Lam
- Produced by: Nam Yin
- Cinematography: Andy Fan
- Edited by: Eric Cheung
- Music by: Mak Chun Hung
- Production companies: Nam Yin Production Co., Ltd. East Entertainment Limited; B&S Limited
- Distributed by: B&S Films Distribution Company Limited
- Release date: October 2000
- Running time: 90 minutes
- Country: Hong Kong
- Language: Cantonese
- Box office: HK$33,045

Troublesome Night 8 (Chinese: 陰陽路八之棺材仔; lit. 'Yin Yang Road Eight: The Coffin Boy') is a 2000 Hong Kong comedy horror film produced by Nam Yin and directed by Edmond Yuen. It is the eighth of the 20 films in the Troublesome Night film series, and the first film of the Buds timeline.

== Plot ==
Bud Pit and his family leave the city and move to a suburb. While moving in, Bud Pit accidentally knocks over a small incense stick holder and is disturbed by a spirit for a while.

While he is initially attracted to his new cheerful neighbor Olive, he becomes suspicious of her when he sees her roaming the streets at night, not recognizing him and behaving like a completely different person. He tells his mother, the expert ghostbuster Mrs Bud Lung, and she unravels the mystery.

They learn that Olive has been possessed every night by a ghost who is looking for her lost son. Mrs Bud Lung promises to help the ghost reunite with her (also deceased) son on the condition that she leaves Olive's body after the reunion.

== Cast ==
- Nadia Chan as Olive
- Simon Lui as Bud Pit
- Law Lan as Mrs. Bud Lung
- Tong Ka-fai as Bud Gay
- Halina Tam as Moon
- Onitsuka as Baat
- Mr Nine as Kau
- Maggie Cheung Ho-yee as woman at temple
- Jameson Lam as man on bus
