= Troublesome Night 7 =

2000 Hong Kong film by Nam Yin

- Film poster
- Traditional Chinese: 陰陽路柒撞到正
- Simplified Chinese: 阴阳路七撞到正
- Hanyu Pinyin: Yīn Yáng Lù Qī Zhuàng Dào Zhèng
- Jyutping: Jam1 Joeng4 Lou6 Cat1 Zong6 Dou3 Zeng3
- Directed by: Nam Yin
- Written by: Nam Yin
- Produced by: Nam Yin
- Cinematography: Joe Chan
- Edited by: Chan Kei-hop
- Music by: Mak Chun Hung
- Production companies: Nam Yin Production Co., Ltd.
- Distributed by: Universe Films Distribution Co. Ltd.
- Release date: 15 January 2000
- Running time: 94 minutes
- Country: Hong Kong
- Language: Cantonese

Troublesome Night 7 (Chinese: 陰陽路柒撞到正; lit. 'Yin Yang Road Seven Hit the Right Spot'), also known as Troublesome Night VII, is a 2000 Hong Kong comedy horror film produced and directed by Nam Yin. It is the seventh of the 20 films in the Troublesome Night film series.

== Plot ==
A film crew travels to a remote island to shoot a music video. The island is inhabited by some villagers and an eccentric police detective.

Paranormal events occur during their stay. Eerie screams are heard at night but the villagers dismiss them as wolves' howling. A strange young man is seen wandering around, asking whether they had seen someone called Ying. In addition, while shooting a scene in the water, the actresses felt something tickling their feet.

An old woman narrates a tragic story about a pair of lovers from the village who were separated from each other because the woman's father opposed the relationship — the man was burnt to death while the woman drowned herself at sea.

A mysterious feral child is revealed to be the one responsible for the screams, and the old woman recognises him as the lovers' long-lost son. A ritual is performed to put the lovers' spirits to rest and their son is adopted by the villagers.

== Cast ==
- Louis Koo as Lok
- Nadia Chan as Ying
- Simon Lui as Detective Lui
- Amanda Lee as Amanda Li
- Wayne Lai as Alex Cheung
- Frankie Ng as Hung
- May Law as Fa
- Celia Sze as Yu
- Hui Siu-hung as Tat
- Michael Tsui as Keung
- Law Lan as Granny Ping
- Pang Ka-lai as Lai
- Gregory Lee as Ho
- Oscar Leung as Lok and Ying's son
- Gordon Leung as Gordon
- Cub Chin as village chief
- Lee Wai-ki as Kenji
- Ho Fat-sang as Dee
