= Love Me, Love My Money =

2001 Hong Kong film by Wong Jing

- Film poster
- Directed by: Wong Jing
- Written by: Wong Jing
- Produced by: Wong Jing
- Starring: Tony Leung; Shu Qi
- Cinematography: Dick Tung; Ko Chiu-Lam
- Edited by: Hai Kit-Wai
- Music by: Chan Kwong-Wing
- Release date: 18 October 2001
- Running time: 99 minutes
- Country: Hong Kong
- Language: Cantonese
- Box office: HK$4.7 million

Love Me, Love My Money (Chinese: 有情飲水飽) is a 2001 Hong Kong romantic comedy film written, produced and directed by Wong Jing, and starring Tony Leung Chiu-Wai and Shu Qi.

The original Chinese title for the film is Yau ching yum sui ba'u. It is a popular saying that literally translates as - When in Love, Even Plain Water Can Be a Filling Meal.

== Summary ==
Richard Ma is a tightfisted, mean, and unpleasant character. He is also a wealthy businessman who has become increasingly bitter and mistrustful due to what he believes are the gold digging women in his life.

Following a series of events one weekend, Richard's financial assets are temporarily frozen, his house is looted by his bitter ex-girlfriend and he has no cash leaving him helpless and broke.

It is during this fateful weekend that he meets Choi; a struggling stockbroker who is trying to ward off the attentions of an unwanted suitor from her local village. By offering to help Ah Choi in return for financial gain, a most surprising relationship develops between this unlikely pair.

== Cast ==
- Tony Leung Chiu-Wai as Richard Ma (Bastard)
- Shu Qi as Choi
- Gordon Lam as Tom
- Teresa Mak as Fong
- Cho Chun
- Wong Yut-Fei

== References to Hong Kong culture ==
- The film is a satirical reflection of the materialistic nature of modern Hong Kong society.
- Drinking games are popular in Hong Kong. About 15 minutes into the film they play a drinking game called 'Millionaire'. For this, everyone has to perform one of three gestures and each person takes turns to call them out. If both people are doing the same gesture, the person calling wins and the other drinks. Tony Leung and Shu Qi play another game a little while after called 'Liar'.
