= Prison on Fire – Life Sentence =

2001 Hong Kong film by Edmond Yuen

- Film poster
- Traditional Chinese: 監獄風雲之終身犯
- Simplified Chinese: 监狱风云之终身犯
- Hanyu Pinyin: Jiān Yù Fēng Yún Zhī Zhōng Shēn Fàn
- Jyutping: Gaam1 Jeok6 Fung1 Wan4 Zi1 Zung1 San1 Faan2
- Directed by: Edmond Yuen
- Screenplay by: Nam Yin; Rex Hou
- Produced by: Nam Yin
- Starring: Ben Wong; Iris Wong; Tommy Wong; William Ho; Lee Wai-kei; Chapman To; Bill Lung
- Cinematography: Yip Wai-ying
- Music by: Mak Chun Hung
- Production companies: B&S Limited; East Entertainment
- Distributed by: B&S Films Distribution
- Release date: 18 March 2001
- Running time: 83 minutes
- Country: Hong Kong
- Language: Cantonese
- Box office: HK$18,240

Prison on Fire – Life Sentence is a 2001 Hong Kong crime thriller film directed by Edmond Yuen and starring Ben Wong, Iris Wong, Tommy Wong, William Ho, Lee Wai-kei, Chapman To and Bill Lung. Despite the title, this film is not related to the 1987 film Prison on Fire and its 1991 sequel.

== Plot ==
A group of prisoners were doing a variety of activities in the courtyard. Big Fool (William Ho) and Crazy Bill (Tommy Wong) are playing basketball and Bill kicks the ball towards Tung (Ben Wong), who kicks it away. Bill felt humiliated by it and stars a fight with Tung where Tung ends out hospitalized. During hospitalization, Tung thinks about the time when his family moved to another house and opened a food stall nearby. However, their stall was burnt by triad leader Sing (Bill Lung), who constantly bullies Tung's family and also raped Tung's girlfriend, Sau (Iris Wong). Unable to tolerate Sing's bullying, Tung kills Sing by chopping him to death, which leads Tung to being imprisoned.

== Cast ==
- Ben Wong as Ho Sun-tung (何順東)
- Iris Wong as Sau (秀)
- Tommy Wong as Crazy Bill (傻標)
- William Ho as Big Fool (大傻)
- Lee Wai-kei
- Chapman To
- Bill Lung as Brother Sing (大哥成)
- Wong Hok-lam
- Tony Chiu

== Reception ==
=== Critical ===
Hong Kong Film Net gave the film a score of 6.5/10 noting the unoriginal plot, but also praising it as a decent triad film that makes a good contrast to the Hollywood inspired Hong Kong films coming out that period despite its low budget.

=== Box office ===
The film grossed HK$18,240 at the Hong Kong box office during its theatrical run from 8 to 14 March 2001 in Hong Kong.
