= Troublesome Night 17 =

2002 Hong Kong film by Lam Wai-yin

- Film poster
- Traditional Chinese: 陰陽路十七之監房有鬼
- Simplified Chinese: 阴阳路十七之监房有鬼
- Hanyu Pinyin: Yīn Yáng Lù Shí Qī Zhī Jiān Fáng Yóu Guǐ
- Jyutping: Jam1 Joeng4 Lou6 Sap6 Cat1 Zi1 Gaam1 Fong2 Jau5 Gwai2
- Directed by: Lam Wai-yin
- Written by: Jameson Lam
- Produced by: Nam Yin
- Cinematography: Chan Yiu-ming; Mike Pang; Lum Lai-shing; Wong Chun-mo; Lee Chi-wai
- Edited by: Jacky Leung
- Music by: Mak Chun Hung
- Production companies: Nam Yin Production Co., Ltd. East Entertainment Limited; B&S Limited
- Distributed by: B&S Films Distribution Company Limited
- Release date: 5 December 2002
- Running time: 90 minutes
- Country: Hong Kong
- Language: Cantonese
- Box office: HK$15,290

Troublesome Night 17 (Chinese: 陰陽路十七之監房有鬼; lit. 'Yin Yang Road Seventeen: There Is a Ghost in the Prison Cell') is a 2002 Hong Kong comedy horror film produced by Nam Yin and directed by Lam Wai-yin. It is the 17th of the 20 films in the Troublesome Night film series, and the tenth of the Buds timeline.

== Plot ==
Bud Gay is arrested for drug trafficking and sent to prison. When his mother, Mrs. Bud Lung, visits him, she senses that a ghost is haunting him, so she sends Bud Yan to help him. They learn that the spirit is a vengeful ghost of a woman, who had followed suit after her husband committed suicide when he was wrongfully imprisoned. All she wants is to see her husband's grave, which is located behind the prison. When the burial site cannot be found, she thinks she has been fooled so she unleashes her fury on everyone.

== Cast ==
- Sam Lee as Mao
- Teresa Mak as Ng Mei-ho
- Law Lan as Mrs. Bud Lung
- Simon Lui as Bud Pit
- Tong Ka-fai as Bud Gay
- Lee Siu-kei as Brother Gay
- Anita Chan as Audrey
- Ronnie Cheung as Bud Yan
- William Ho as Big Mic
- Baat Leung-gam as Officer Eight
- Mr Nine as Lai Chor-kau
- Onitsuka as Lai Chor-pat
- Anna Ng as Mrs. Ng
- Law Shu-kei as prison warden
- Fung Chi-keung as prisoner
- Big Cheong as policeman
- Lam Wai-yin as Officer Kong
- Nelson Ngai as lawyer
