= Troublesome Night 14 =

2002 Hong Kong film by Yip Wai-ying

- DVD cover
- Traditional Chinese: 陰陽路十四之雙鬼拍門
- Simplified Chinese: 阴阳路十四之双鬼拍门
- Hanyu Pinyin: Yīn Yáng Lù Shí Sì Zhī Shuāng Guǐ Pāi Mén
- Jyutping: Jam1 Joeng4 Lou6 Sap6 Sei3 Zi1 Soeng1 Gwai2 Paak3 Mun4
- Directed by: Yip Wai-ying
- Written by: Jameson Lam
- Produced by: Nam Yin
- Cinematography: Ng Man-ching
- Edited by: Jacky Leung
- Music by: Mak Chun Hung
- Production companies: Nam Yin Production Co., Ltd. East Entertainment Limited; B&S Limited
- Distributed by: B&S Films Distribution Company Limited
- Release date: 2 May 2002
- Running time: 90 minutes
- Country: Hong Kong
- Languages: Cantonese; English
- Box office: HK$25,830

Troublesome Night 14 (Chinese: 陰陽路十四之雙鬼拍門; lit. 'Yin Yang Road Fourteen: Two Ghosts Knocking on the Door') is a 2002 Hong Kong comedy horror film produced by Nam Yin and directed by Yip Wai-ying. It is the 14th of the 20 films in the Troublesome Night film series, and the seventh of the Buds timeline.

== Plot ==
Christin works in a hotel owned by Budcasso, the fiancé of her friend, Zidane. When she is caught embezzling company funds, she turns to Zidane for help but Zidane refuses. Christin then pretends to attempt suicide, hoping that Budcasso will take pity on her, but her stunt goes wrong and she really dies. As she was wearing a red dress when she died, she becomes a vengeful ghost after death and returns to take her revenge.

Meanwhile, Budcasso invites his ex-wife, Mrs Bud Lung, to attend his upcoming wedding. A rivalry ensues between Mrs Bud Lung, a traditional Chinese ghostbuster, and Zidane, who is well-versed in Western occult arts. However, they eventually become friends after joining forces to destroy the malevolent ghost of Christin.

As Budcasso fears the supernatural, he abandons Zidane in the same manner he did to his ex-wife after seeing that his new fiancée is another ghostbuster.

== Cast ==
- Law Lan as Mrs. Bud Lung
- Si Ming as Zidane
- Tong Ka-fai as Bud Gay
- Iris Chai as Fion
- Ronnie Cheung as Bud Yan
- Anita Chan as Hok
- Emily Kwan as Christin
- Joe Junior as Budcasso
- Mr Nine as Lai Chor-kau
- Onitsuka as Lai Chor-pat
