= Troublesome Night 10 =

2001 Hong Kong film by Edmond Yuen

- Film poster
- Traditional Chinese: 陰陽路十宣言咒
- Simplified Chinese: 阴阳路十宣言咒
- Hanyu Pinyin: Yīn Yáng Lù Shí Xuān Yán Zhòu
- Jyutping: Jam1 Joeng4 Lou6 Sap6 Syun1 Jin4 Zau3
- Directed by: Edmond Yuen
- Written by: Jameson Lam; Rex Hon
- Produced by: Nam Yin
- Cinematography: Yip Wai-ying; Chan Yiu-ming
- Edited by: Eric Cheung
- Music by: Mak Chun Hung
- Production companies: Nam Yin Production Co., Ltd. East Entertainment Limited; B&S Limited
- Distributed by: B&S Films Distribution Company Limited
- Release date: 22 March 2001
- Running time: 90 minutes
- Country: Hong Kong
- Language: Cantonese
- Box office: HK$33,080

Troublesome Night 10 (Chinese: 陰陽路十宣言咒; lit. 'Yin Yang Road Ten Declaration Spell') is a 2001 Hong Kong comedy horror film produced by Nam Yin and directed by Edmond Yuen. It is the tenth of the 20 films in the Troublesome Night film series, and the third of the Buds timeline.

== Plot ==
A boss and his employees go on an excursion to Cheung Chau. The stingy boss rents a building for its low rental rate, even though he is aware that people had died from unnatural causes there. He meets a young woman and tries to woo her. Meanwhile, the employees encounter abnormal events while enjoying themselves and they begin to suspect that the woman might be linked to those strange events.

== Cast ==
- Wayne Lai as the Boss
- Law Lan as Mrs. Bud Lung
- Sherming Yiu as Yee
- Tong Ka-fai as Bud Gay
- Grace Lam as See
- Wong Hok-lam as Lim
- Onitsuka as Lai Chor-pat
- Mr Nine as Lai Chor-kau
- Alson Wong as Pong
- Benny Law as Keung
- Pinky Cheung as Ghost
- Jeff Kam as Jeffrey
