= Troublesome Night 13 =

2002 Hong Kong-Thai film by Chan Yiu-ming

- Film poster
- Traditional Chinese: 陰陽路十三之花鬼
- Simplified Chinese: 阴阳路十三之花鬼
- Hanyu Pinyin: Yīn Yáng Lù Shí Sān Zhī Huā Guǐ
- Jyutping: Jam1 Joeng4 Lou6 Sap6 Saam1 Zi1 Faa1 Gwai2
- Directed by: Chan Yiu-ming
- Written by: Jameson Lam; Hoh Dung
- Produced by: Nam Yin
- Cinematography: Chan Yiu-ming
- Edited by: Jacky Leung
- Music by: Mak Chun Hung
- Production companies: Nam Yin Production Co., Ltd. East Entertainment Limited; B&S Limited
- Distributed by: B&S Films Distribution Company Limited
- Release date: 31 January 2002
- Running time: 110 minutes
- Countries: Hong Kong; Thailand
- Languages: Cantonese; Thai
- Box office: HK$32,300

Troublesome Night 13 (Chinese: 陰陽路十三之花鬼; lit. 'Yin Yang Road Thirteen: Flower Ghost') is a 2002 comedy horror film produced by Nam Yin and directed by Chan Yiu-ming. It is the 13th of the 20 films in the Troublesome Night film series, and the sixth of the Buds timeline.

== Plot ==
Chow Ka-ho's father runs a big business in Thailand. Lik and May, a pair of siblings, work for them. One day, overcome by lust, Chow rapes and murders May and then buries her body in a secret location before fleeing back to Hong Kong. Chow's friends – Bud Yan and his cousin Bud Gay, and the Lai brothers – go on a trip to Thailand. At the hotel, they meet an attractive receptionist, Hok, and get her to be their tour guide. Bud Yan has a one-night stand with Hok.

One day, while riding a banana boat at the beach, the boat suddenly capsizes and Bud Gay almost drowns. In his subconscious state, he encounters May's ghost, who gives him a gold chain with her spirit attached to it. May's ghost follows Bud Gay back to Hong Kong to seek revenge on Chow. At the same time, Hok also tracks down Bud Yan in Hong Kong and insists on being his girlfriend.

After encountering May's ghost, a fearful Chow seeks help from Bud Gay's mother, ghostbuster Mrs Bud Lung. He lies to her that he killed May by accident and feels guilty about it. Mrs Bud Lung manages to subdue and capture May's ghost.

In the meantime, Lik and his friend Mint, a novice ghostbuster, show up in Hong Kong and try to save May's ghost but Mint is no match for Mrs Bud Lung. Lik and Mint then plead with Mrs Bud Lung to release May's ghost; Mrs Bud Lung agrees and May's ghost tells everyone the truth behind her death.

Chow tries to flee when his lies are exposed but eventually gets his just deserts in a fatal car accident. The rest return to Thailand, unearth May's remains and lay her to rest in a proper funeral.

== Cast ==
- Law Lan as Mrs. Bud Lung
- Ken Wong as Lik
- Zoie Tam as May
- Anita Chan as Hok
- Ronnie Cheung as Bud Yan
- Tong Ka-fai as Bud Gay
- Crystal Cheung as Mint
- Yu Ka-ho as Chow Ka-ho
- Onitsuka as Lai Chor-pat
- Mr Nine as Lai Chor-kau
- Ma Arissara Sitthi Sarankil as Sister Ling
- Jass Chan as hotel receptionist
