= Troublesome Night 2 =

1997 Hong Kong film by Herman Yau

- VCD cover

Chinese name
- Traditional Chinese: 陰陽路之我在你左右
- Simplified Chinese: 阴阳路之我在你左右
Transcriptions
Standard Mandarin
- Hanyu Pinyin: Yīn Yáng Lù Zhī Wǒ Zài Nǐ Zuǒ Yòu
Yue: Cantonese
- Jyutping: Jam1 Joeng4 Lou6 Zi1 Ngo5 Zoi6 Nei5 Zo2 Jau6
- Directed by: Herman Yau
- Written by: Kenneth Lau; Chang Kwok-tse
- Produced by: Nam Yin
- Starring: Louis Koo; Simon Lui; Chin Kar-lok; Amanda Lee; Vincent Kok; Cheung Tat-ming; Wayne Lai; Christine Ng
- Cinematography: Joe Chan
- Edited by: Chan Kei-hop
- Music by: Mak Chun Hung
- Production companies: Win's Entertainment; Nam Yin Production Co., Ltd.
- Distributed by: China Star Entertainment Group
- Release date: July 1997
- Running time: 96 minutes
- Country: Hong Kong
- Language: Cantonese

Troublesome Night 2 (Chinese: 陰陽路之我在你左右; lit. 'I Am By Your Side in Yin Yang Road') is a 1997 Hong Kong comedy horror film produced by Nam Yin and directed by Herman Yau. It is the second of the 20 films in the Troublesome Night film series.

== Plot ==
The film consists of three segments. The first is about a girl who calls a radio station for comfort after her boyfriend died in a tragic incident. One of the DJs insensitively suggests that she should commit suicide to join her boyfriend. She heeds his suggestion and the DJ feels guilty when her ghost returns to haunt him.

The second segment is about a group of friends on a voyage who encounter paranormal events after they rescue a mysterious woman from a boat wreckage. The third segment is about another DJ who quits his job after the untimely deaths of his colleagues. He becomes a street racer and stumbles upon a sinister ghost on the road.

== Cast ==
- Louis Koo as Sam
- Simon Lui as Chai
- Allen Ting as Fai
- Chin Kar-lok as Chuen
- Wan Yue-hung as Sau
- Au-yeung Miu-chi as girl killed in accident
- Frankie Ng as Wah
- Amanda Lee as Anita
- Vincent Kok as manager
- Hui Fan as Anita's mother
- Cheung Tat-ming as Dan
- Wayne Lai as Curry
- Christine Ng as Miu
- Liz Kong as girl floating in sea
- Chan Chi-fai as motorbike racer
- Fong Yue as Auntie Six
