= Troublesome Night (film series) =

Hong Kong comedy horror anthology film series

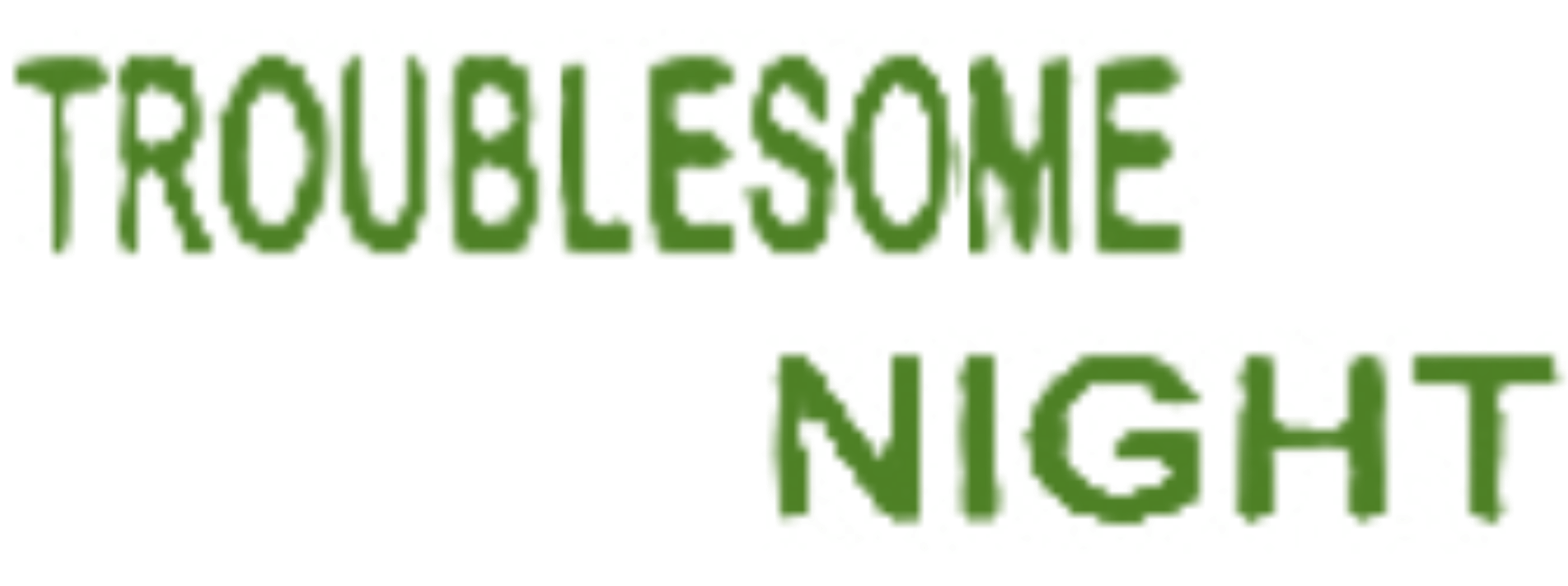
- 陰陽路
- Directed by: Herman Yau (1–6; 20); Steve Cheng (1); Victor Tam (1); Nam Yin (7); Edmond Yuen (8; 10); Ivan Lai (9); Yeung Wan-king (11); Yip Wai-ying (12; 14; 16; 19); Chan Yiu-ming (13); Jamie Luk (15); Lam Wai-yin (17); Jameson Lam (18)
- Written by: Kenneth Lau (1–5); Chau Ting (1); Yeung Woon-choi (1); Chang Kwok-tse (2–6); Nam Yin (6–7); Jameson Lam (8; 10–14; 16–19); Leung Po-on (9; 12); Rex Hon (9–10); Hoh Dung (13); Yee Yan (15); Herman Yau (20)
- Produced by: Nam Yin (1–20); Stanley Tong (20)
- Starring: Various
- Country: Hong Kong
- Language: Cantonese

Troublesome Night (Chinese: 陰陽路; lit. 'Yin Yang Road') is a comedy horror anthology film series from Hong Kong. Directed primarily from Herman Yau, the series includes 20 films, making it one of the longest-running in Hong Kong cinema. Each film features standalone stories or connected plots about supernatural events and ghost encounters, often set in everyday Hong Kong life.

== History ==
The original run of films lasted between 1997 and 2003 and had 19 films, which means that the original Troublesome Night spawned more sequels than any other horror film at the time. The first six films were directed by Herman Yau but after that he lost interest and producer Nam Yin kept the series alive. From the eighth to the nineteenth films, the Bud family serves as the primary protagonists. A twentieth installment was released in 2017 to celebrate the 20th anniversary of the first film.

== Films ==
- Troublesome Night (1997)
- Troublesome Night 2 (1997)
- Troublesome Night 3 (1998)
- Troublesome Night 4 (1998)
- Troublesome Night 5 (1999)
- Troublesome Night 6 (1999)
- Troublesome Night 7 (2000)
- Troublesome Night 8 (2000)
- Troublesome Night 9 (2001)
- Troublesome Night 10 (2001)
- Troublesome Night 11 (2001)
- Troublesome Night 12 (2001)
- Troublesome Night 13 (2002)
- Troublesome Night 14 (2002)
- Troublesome Night 15 (2002)
- Troublesome Night 16 (2002)
- Troublesome Night 17 (2002)
- Troublesome Night 18 (2003)
- Troublesome Night 19 (2003)
- Always Be with You (2017)

== See also ==
- Cantonese culture
- Chinese horror film
