= Troublesome Night 16 =

2002 Hong Kong film by Yip Wai-ying

- Film poster
- Traditional Chinese: 陰陽路十六之回到武俠時代
- Simplified Chinese: 阴阳路十六之回到武侠时代
- Hanyu Pinyin: Yīn Yáng Lù Shí Lìu Zhī Huí Dào Wǔ Xiá Shí Dài
- Jyutping: Jam1 Joeng4 Lou6 Sap6 Luk6 Zi1 Wui4 Dou3 Mou5 Hap6 Si4 Doi6
- Directed by: Yip Wai-ying
- Written by: Jameson Lam
- Based on: Water Margin by Shi Nai'an
- Produced by: Nam Yin
- Cinematography: Ng Man-juen; Ng Man-ching; Mike Pang; Lum Lai-shing; Cheung Yuk-chuen
- Music by: Mak Chun Hung
- Production companies: Nam Yin Production Co., Ltd. East Entertainment Limited; B&S Limited
- Distributed by: B&S Films Distribution Company Limited
- Release date: 5 September 2002
- Running time: 85 minutes
- Country: Hong Kong
- Language: Cantonese
- Box office: HK$4,810

Troublesome Night 16 (Chinese: 陰陽路十六之回到武俠時代; lit. 'Yin Yang Road Sixteen: Back to the Martial Arts Era') is a 2002 Hong Kong meta comedy horror film produced by Nam Yin and directed by Yip Wai-ying. It is the 16th of the 20 films in the Troublesome Night film series, and the ninth of the Buds timeline.

== Plot ==
Bud Gay and Bud Yan travel back in time to the Song dynasty and encounter characters from the 14th century Chinese classical novel Water Margin. The film spoofs the story of Wu Song avenging his brother, with the Buds playing important roles in affecting how the story unfolds.

== Cast ==
- Simon Lui as Ximen Qing
- Yammie Lam as Pan Jinlian
- Law Lan as Mrs. Bud Lung / Granny Wang
- Kenny Bee as Song Jiang
- Lawrence Lau as Wu Dalang
- Tong Ka-fai as Bud Gay
- Ronnie Cheung as Bud Yan
- Onitsuka as Lai Chor-pat / Yan Qing
- Mr Nine as Lai Chor-kau / Lu Zhishen
- Chan Sze-wai as Sandy
- Ken Chung as Wu Song
