= Louis Koo =

Hong Kong actor (born 1970)

- 古天樂
- Louis Koo at the 49th Hong Kong International Film Festival as its Filmmaker in Focus for 2025.
- Born: Koo Tin-lok; 21 October 1970 (age 56); British Hong Kong
- Occupations: Actor; model; singer; film producer
- Years active: 1993–present
- Awards: Hong Kong Film Awards – Best Actor; 2018 'Paradox' Asian Film Awards – Best Actor; 2018 'Paradox' TVB Anniversary Awards – Best Actor; 1999 'Detective Investigation Files IV'; 2001 'A Step into the Past'

Chinese name
- Traditional Chinese: 古天樂
- Simplified Chinese: 古天乐
Transcriptions
Standard Mandarin
- Hanyu Pinyin: Gǔ Tiānlè
Yue: Cantonese
- Jyutping: Gu2 Tin1-Lok6
- Website: kootinlok.com/blog

Louis Koo Tin-lok (Chinese: 古天樂; born 21 October 1970) is a Hong Kong actor and film producer. He gained popularity with his roles in television series The Condor Heroes 95 (1995), Detective Investigation Files IV (1999), and A Step into the Past (2001).

After 2001, Koo shifted his focus to films, frequently collaborating with director Johnnie To in films such as Throw Down (2004), Election 2 (2006), Romancing in Thin Air (2012), and Drug War (2012). His other notable films include Protégé (2007), Run Papa Run (2008), Connected (2008), Overheard (2009), The White Storm (2013), Paradox (2017), A Witness Out of the Blue (2019), and Twilight of the Warriors: Walled In (2024). For his performance in Paradox, Koo won the Hong Kong Film Award for Best Actor and Asian Film Award for Best Actor.

== Early life ==
Koo Tin-lok was born in Hong Kong on 21 October 1970, and educated there. His father was an actor who later became a businessman. Koo is an alumnus of St. Teresa's School Kowloon, Carmel Secondary School and Carmel Divine Grace Foundation Secondary School.

=== Teenage life ===
Koo, along with his friends, were convicted by the court because of robbing in November 1990. Koo was sentenced to 22 months in the Correctional Services Lai King Training Centre. He neither mentioned nor acknowledged the event to the public after joining the entertainment industry, only after being exposed by the media in 1994.

== Career ==
During 1992 to 1993, Koo was a modelling agent, sometimes he worked as a model for advertisements and karaoke videos.

=== Television actor ===
In 1993, Koo signed as a contract artist with TVB (Television Broadcasts Limited).

Koo started gaining wide recognition in 1995 with his leading role in a costume drama The Condor Heroes 95, a popular series based on a classic wuxia novel. In 1997, Koo began sporting an extreme tan (for which he is well known), which apparently enabled him to take on more contemporary roles. In 1999, Koo received TVB's Most Popular Actor Award for Detective Investigation Files IV. In 2000, Koo received TVB's Most Favorite Character Award for At the Threshold of an Era II. Koo took a different approach to his role in A Step Into the Past. This deviation from his usual cool aloof on-screen persona to a funnier, carefree and down-to-earth one resonated with the audience and widened his acting range. In 2001, Koo was given TVB's Most Popular Actor Award and Favorite Character Award Award once again for A Step into the Past. He then went on an indefinite hiatus from television and has since focused on his film career.

Due to the popularity of TVB dramas in the late 1990s, Koo amassed a sizeable fan base in Hong Kong, Taiwan, mainland China and South-east Asia.

=== Film actor ===
Since 1994, Koo began taking on roles in films, such as the paranormal Troublesome Night series and many action films including Wilson Yip's Bullets Over Summer (1999). Koo acted as a mute boy living on rural island in romantic literary film Sealed with a Kiss (1998).

During 2001 to 2004, Koo signed contract with China Star Entertainment Group and starred in many romantic comedies, such as La Brassiere and Naked Ambition.

In 2004, Koo took on the role of Sze-to Bo, a perpetually drunk and despondent former judo champion with hereditary eye disease, in Johnnie To's Throw Down which was premiered at the 61st Venice International Film Festival. The movie was a marked departure from his usual commercial genres, and he also began his long-term collaboration with To and Milkyway Image.

Koo later received international acclaim for his chilling performance in Johnnie To's Election 2 (a.k.a. Triad Election), which was screened at the "Out of Competition" section at the 59th Cannes Film Festival (Election was competitive film at the 58th Cannes Film Festival). He won the award for Most Beloved Actor in the Hong Kong UA Film Awards 2006 through public voting for his role in Election 2.

In a female perspective romantic film Happy Birthday (2006) adapted by Sylvia Chang from Rene Liu's novella, Koo portrayed a sensitive man who continued to take care of his ex-girlfriend after his death.

Koo also took supporting roles in action movies, such as Jackie Chan's Robin B Hood (2006), Donnie Yen's Flash Point (2007).

His character as an unscrupulous drug addict in Derek Yee's Protégé (2007) differed from his previous performances, as he forwent his suave image for an emaciated look. The supporting role earned him positive critical feedback and Best Supporting Actor nominations at the Hong Kong Film Awards and the Golden Horse Awards.

In Sylvia Chang's female perspective gangster film Run Papa Run (2008), Koo played a reckless triad leader who tried to shield his daughter from his past misdemeanours. Koo earned Best Actor nominations in the Hong Kong Film Awards and Golden Horse Award for this role, which required him to portray a character from his late teens to his fifties. Since then Koo took more challenging father roles and middle-aged roles.

In the remake of Cellular, Connected (2008) directed by Benny Chan, he played an average Joe cast in a race against time to save a stranger.

In Soi Cheang's Accident (2009) which was a competitive film at the 66th Venice International Film Festival, Koo acted as a highly-strung killer-group leader who was good at disguising murders as accidents.

In Overheard (2009) directed by Alan Mak and Felix Chong, he put on 30 pounds' weight to take the role of a middle-aged cop and father of four more convincingly, and earned Best Actor nominations in Hong Kong Film Critics Society Awards. This film was successful and was then made into a series with the same cast and directors but different stories.

In 2010 Koo signed pre-paid contracts with Pegasus Motion Pictures, then appeared in its All's well, ends well comedy series, and it's anti-corruption film series (Z Storm, S Storm).

In costume A Chinese Ghost Story (2011), Koo acted as a Chinese Taoist "Exorcist" who fell in love with a fox-fairy and sacrificed himself in the end. Koo made a return to his romantic comedy roots in Don't Go Breaking My Heart and sequel Don't Go Breaking My Heart 2 (2014) directed by Johnnie To and Wai Ka-Hui, acting as a dissolute stock broker.

In Drug War (2012) directed by Johnnie To, Koo took on the role of a ruthless and deliberate Hong Kong drug lord who dared to do anything to get away from mainland China's death penalty.

Koo received a Hong Kong Film Award for Best Actor nomination again for his undercover cop role in Benny Chan's 2013 film The White Storm.

In Out of Inferno (2013), Koo acted as a resigned firefighter who encountered a fire in a high-rise building.

In Overheard 3 (2014), he acted as a revenger with artificial limb.

In Soi Cheang's SPL II: A Time for Consequences (2015), Koo took the role of an ill and evil mastermind of a criminal organization. In Johnnie To's Three (2016), Koo acted as a cop leader at the edge of crime.

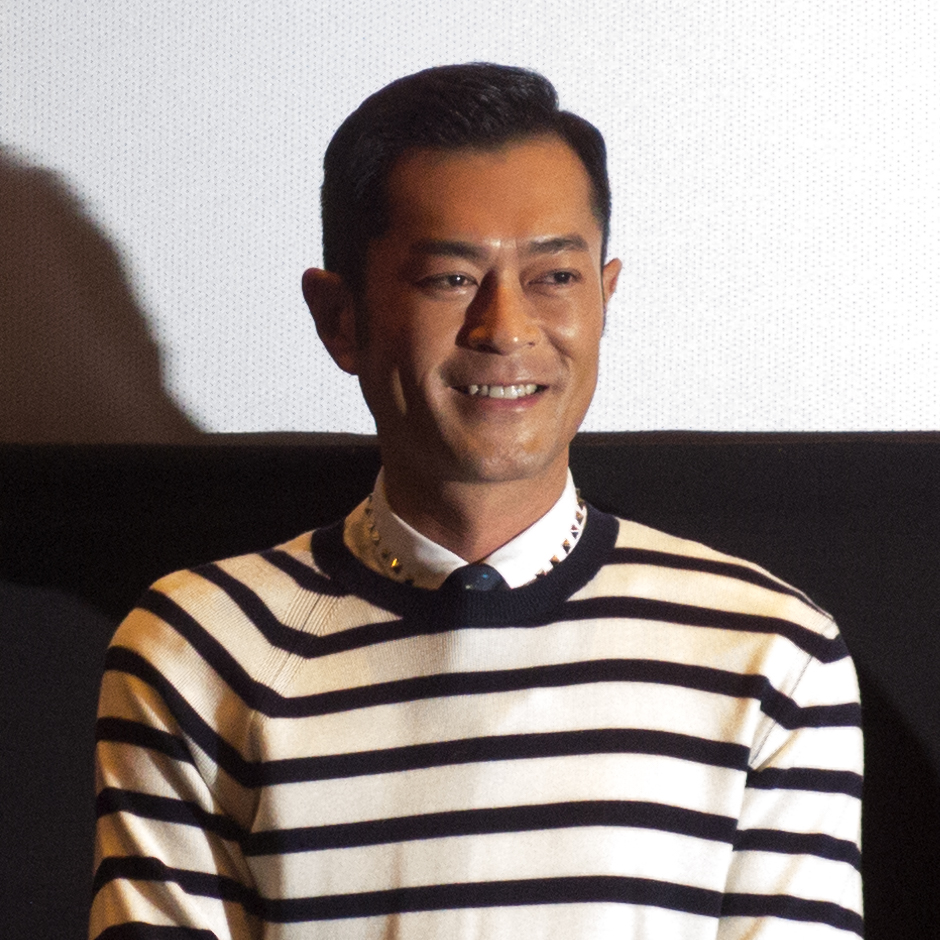
Koo in August 2017

In Shed Skin Papa (2017), a competitive film at the 29th Tokyo International Film Festival, Koo acted as a frustrated director who came to understand his father after his mother's funeral and a series of fantastic incidents.

In Paradox (2017), Koo played a cop who was determined to avenge his daughter, and performed most of the film's action sequences without the use of a stunt double. For his performance in the film, Koo won Asian Film Award for Best Actor at the 12th Asian Film Awards as well the Hong Kong Film Directors' Guild Award for Best Actor at the 12th Hong Kong Film Directors' Guild Award in March 2018. Koo's performance also won him the Best Actor award at the 37th Hong Kong Film Awards held on 15 April 2018.

=== Film producer ===
Koo was captivated by Star Wars film series when he was a child. After a decades-long acting career in the film industry, he anticipated the rise of China's own Sci-fi films, so he purchased several Visual effects and Prosthetic make-up companies. In 2013, Koo founded "One Cool Group Limited". As of 2018, One Cool Group has produced 20 films. The sci-fi action film Warriors of Future, which Koo produced and stars in, was released on 25 August 2022.

One Cool Group was to set up an entertainment company with Media Asia in 2021, forming a new group named Cool Style. Investors included Hong Kong model and actress Angelababy Yang Ying, Angelababy's agent Kim Chou and Hong Kong film director Stephen Fung’s production company Film Magic Pictures. Cool Style's business scope includes artist management and related businesses aiming to cultivate new forces with abundant resources and platforms.

Koo was able to acquire the rights of the series A Step into the Past in 2015 and adapt it for the big screen - Back to the Past. Production for the film officially wrapped on 7 July 2019. Koo will also star in the film reprising his role from the series.

In 2021, Koo served as executive producer for two Hollywood animation films, The Mitchells vs. the Machines and Vivo, with the former being nominated for the Academy Award for Best Animated Feature at the 94th Academy Awards.

Koo also served as executive producer on The Garfield Movie, which was theatrically released on 24 May 2024.

=== Social work in film industry ===
Koo has been the ambassador of Hong Kong International Film Festival from 2014 to 2018.

In 2015, Koo joined the board of Fresh Wave International Short Film Festival held in Hong Kong.

In January 2018, Koo was elected as the president of Hong Kong Performing Artistes Guild.

== Other works ==
=== Writer ===
Koo has published several books over the years including his photo albums Present (1999) and Cool (2001), as well as his autobiography Find Happiness (2002). He also released Toys Battle (2008), a book chronicling his love for comic book characters and movie superheroes, and donated all proceeds to UNICEF. Koo has been writing blogs everyday on his own website since December 2006.

=== Singer ===
Koo recorded several theme songs for the TVB dramas he had starred in and several TV advertisement songs he had endorsed. He had also cut four albums: Boyfriend and Popular Louis in 2000, optimism in 2001, Mr.Cool in 2003.

=== Designer ===
Koo was a designer of his own eyewear brand ZeroX, Level Nine, and Louis Koo. He also participated in designs of his own books, websites, company logos and some endorsed brands.

=== Brand spokesperson ===
With a career spanning two decades, Koo has endorsed a large number of brands in Hong Kong and Mainland China. Some of the major brand endorsements include, Pepsi, Brooks Brothers, Samsung Galaxy, Xbox 360 Kinect, Toyota Corolla, Yokohama Tire, Lay's, Lipton, Lotte chewing gum, Tropicana, Gillette, OSIM, Tag Heuer, Epson printer, Matisse, Johnnie Walker, Pentax camera, Clinique, Hugo Boss Perfume, Bally, Puma, DBS Black World MasterCard.

== Charity ==
In July 2012, Chinese microblogs caught on to the news of Koo's low profile philanthropy in China, which became a trending topic, more and more people born in different remote rural areas found that local elementary schools were built with donation of Koo, and upload photos to the microblogs. Major Chinese dailies further reported that he had helped build 49 schools to help the underprivileged in remote areas in rural China for the past three years without any publicity. Koo was reluctant to comment on the issue but it was learnt that Koo set up his charity foundation after witnessing the devastation from the Sichuan earthquake in 2008. According to "Grace charity" website, Koo has helped build 97 elementary school buildings, 18 clinics and 751 small water supply projects in remote undeveloped areas of rural China through "Grace Charity Foundation Limited" and local government by 2017.

Koo is also a UNICEF (United Nations International Children's Emergency Fund) ambassador since 2007.

== Personal life ==
From 1995 to 2002, Koo was in a relationship with Natalie Wong.

== Filmography ==
=== Film ===
Year	Title	Role	Notes/Ref.
1994	Organized Crime & Triad Bureau	Tung's underling	
1994	Let's Go Slam Dunk	basketball player	
1996	On Fire		
1996	Man Wanted 2	Rung	
1996	Street of Fury	Lung	
1997	Troublesome Night	Ken Ng Chi-keung	
1997	Troublesome Night 2	Sam	
1998	Troublesome Night 3	Cheng Lik	
1998	T.H.E. Professionals	Officer Kong	
1998	God.com	Officer Chan	
1998	The Suspect	Don Lee	
1998	Troublesome Night 4	Wing	
1999	Troublesome Night 5	Lam Chung-fat	
1999	Troublesome Night 6	Inspector Wong	
1999	Rules of the Game	David Chow	
1999	Super Car Criminals		
1999	Bullets Over Summer	Brian	
1999	Century of the Dragon	Wong Chi-shing	
1999	Sealed with a Kiss	Kam Sui	
1999	The Masked Prosecutor	Tong Hiu-tai	
1999	The Young Ones		Cameo
2000	For Bad Boys Only	Jack Shum	
2000	Troublesome Night 7	Lok	
2000	Conman in Tokyo	Cool	
2001	Born Wild	Tan Ho	
2001	The Legend of Zu	Red	
2001	La Brassiere	Wayne	
2002	The Lion Roars	Seasonal Chan	
2002	Fat Choi Spirit	Louis	
2002	Dry Wood Fierce Fire	Ryan Li	
2002	Women From Mars	Servant of Hell	Cameo
2002	Mighty Baby	Wayne	
2003	Love for All Seasons	Tiger Hung	
2003	Why Me, Sweetie?!	Dong	
2003	Good Times, Bed Times	Paul Ko Chi-keung	
2003	Naked Ambition	Andy	Also producer
2003	Lost in Time	Ah Man	Special appearance
2004	Fantasia	Sam	
2004	Love on the Rocks	Wong Kai-ming	
2004	Throw Down	Sze-to Bo	
2005	Election	Jimmy Lee	
2006	Election 2	Jimmy Lee	
2006	Rob-B-Hood	Octopus	
2006	Happy Birthday	Nam	
2007	Protégé	Jane's Husband	Nominated—Hong Kong Film Award for Best Supporting Actor; Nominated—Golden Horse Award For Best Supporting Actor
2007	Triangle	Fai	
2007	Flash Point	Wilson	
2008	Run Papa Run	Tiger Lee Tin-yun	Nominated—Hong Kong Film Award for Best Actor; Nominated—Golden Horse Award For Best Actor
2008	Connected	Bob	
2009	Accident	Brain	
2009	All's Well, Ends Well 2009	Dick Cho	
2009	On His Majesty's Secret Service	Royal Dog	
2009	Poker King	Jack Chang	
2009	Overheard	Gene Yeung	Nominated—Hong Kong Film Critics Society Awards for Best Actor
2010	All's Well, Ends Well 2010	Emperor	
2010	Triple Tap	Ken Kwan	
2011	The Road Less Traveled	Hui Shing-leung	
2011	All's Well, Ends Well 2011	Sammy Shum	
2011	Mr. and Mrs. Incredible	Gazer Warrior	
2011	Don't Go Breaking My Heart	Sean Cheung	
2011	A Chinese Ghost Story	Yin Chek-ha	
2011	Overheard 2	Jack Ho Chi-keung	
2011	Magic to Win	Wood Magician	Cameo
2012	All's Well, Ends Well 2012	Peng Kin	
2012	Romancing in Thin Air	Michael Lau	
2013	Drug War	Timmy Choi Tim-ming	
2013	Out of Inferno	Keung	
2013	The White Storm	So Kin-chow	Nominated—Hong Kong Film Award for Best Actor
2014	Hello Babies		Cameo
2014	Golden Chickensss	Jiangmen Louis Koo	Cameo
2014	Naked Ambition 2	Naoki Nagasaki	Cameo; also producer
2014	Aberdeen	Cheng Wai-to	
2014	Overheard 3	Lau Wing-jau	
2014	Z Storm	William Luk	
2014	Don't Go Breaking My Heart 2	Sean Cheung	
2015	An Inspector Calls	Inspector Karl	
2015	12 Golden Ducks	Rocky	Cameo
2015	Triumph in the Skies	Branson Cheung	
2015	Little Big Master	Tse Wing-tung	
2015	SPL II: A Time for Consequences	Mr. Hung	Special appearance
2015	Paris Holiday	Lam Chun-kit	
2015	Wild City	T-Man	
2016	Three	Ken Chan	
2016	League of Gods	Shen Gongbao	
2016	Line Walker	Shiu Chi-long	
2016	Call of Heroes	Cho Siu-lun	
2016	S Storm	William Luk	
2016	Shed Skin Papa	Tin Lik-hang	
2017	Dealer/Healer	Halley	Special appearance
2017	Meow	Ng Sau-lung	
2017	Paradox	Lee Chung-chi	Asian Film Award for Best Actor; Hong Kong Film Directors' Guild Award for Best Actor; Hong Kong Film Awards for Best Actor
2017	Always Be With You	Sam	
2018	L Storm	William Luk	
2018	Kung Fu Monster	Feng Si-hai	
2019	A Home with a View	Wong Siu-choi	
2019	P Storm	William Luk	
2019	Chasing the Dragon II: Wild Wild Bunch	Sky Ho	
2019	The White Storm 2: Drug Lords	Jizo	Nominated—Hong Kong Film Award for Best Original Film Song
2019	Line Walker 2: Invisible Spy	Cheng Chun-yin	
2019	A Witness Out of the Blue	Sean Wong	Nominated—Hong Kong Film Award for Best Actor
2021	Dynasty Warriors	Lü Bu	
2021	Once Upon a Time in Hong Kong	Hank Chan	
2021	All U Need Is Love	Captain of the Epidemic Prevention Operation Unit	
2021	The Mitchells vs. the Machines	—N/a	Executive producer only
2021	Vivo	—N/a	Executive producer only
2021	Anita	Eddie Lau	Nominated—Hong Kong Film Award for Best Supporting Actor
2021	G Storm	William Luk	
2022	Warriors of Future	Tyler	Also producer
2022	Marmaduke	—N/a	Executive producer only
2022	New Kung Fu Cult Master 1	Cheung Chui-shan	
2022	New Kung Fu Cult Master 2	Cheung Chui-shan	
2023	The White Storm 3: Heaven or Hell	Au Chi-yuen	
2023	Death Notice	Wong Siu-ping	
2023	Vital Sign		
2024	The Garfield Movie	—N/a	Executive producer only
2024	Twilight of the Warriors: Walled In	Cyclone	
2025	Hit N Fun	Bruce Chung	
2025	Sons of the Neon Night	Ching Man-sing	
2025	Behind the Shadows	Au Yeung Wai-yip	Nominated—Hong Kong Film Award for Best Actor; Hong Kong Film Critics Society Award for Best Actor
2025	Back to the Past	Hong Siu-lung	Nominated—Hong Kong Film Award for Best Actor
2026	Cold War 1994	Adrian Yip	
2026	Mastermind		
2026	The Angry Birds Movie 3	—N/a	Executive producer
TBD	Beyond the Sin		Post-production
TBD	The Trier of Fact	Car Che	Post-production
TBD	Storm Cloud 3D	Duen Long	Pre-production
TBD	The Strangled Truth		Pre-production
TBD	When It All Begins		Pre-production
TBD	Un Coevr D'Artichaut		Pre-production
TBD	Under Control		Pre-production
TBD	Chasing the Dragon III: Chinatown		Pre-production

=== Television ===
Year	Title	Role	Notes
1994	Knot to Treasure	Wah Ching-hou	
1994	Class of Distinction	Luk Gin-choi	
1995	Happy Harmony	Sung Gwai	
1995	The Condor Heroes 95	Yeung Kuo	
1996	Cold Blood Warm Heart	Yip Sing-hong	
1997	The Hit Man Chronicles	Yan Hua	
1997	War & Remembrance	4th Prince	
1997	Against the Blade of Honour	Ding Pang	
1997	I Can't Accept Corruption	Fong Cheuk-man / Lee Sing-man	
1997	A Recipe for the Heart	Kiu Pak-ko	Nominated - 2nd TVB Anniversary Award for Best Actor
1998	Burning Flame	Lau Hoi-pak	
1999	Man's Best Friend	Tai Jin Sek	
1999	Detective Investigation Files IV	Tsui Fei	Won - 3rd TVB Anniversary Award for Best Actor
1999	At the Threshold of an Era	Nick Cheung Chi-lik	
2000	At the Threshold of an Era II	Nick Cheung Chi-lik	Won - 4th TVB Anniversary Award for Top Favourite Television Characters
2001	A Step into the Past	Hong Siu-lung	Won - 5th TVB Anniversary Award for Best Actor; Won - 5th TVB Anniversary Award for Top Favourite Television Characters

== Honors ==
In 2018, 55382 Kootinlok, a main-belt asteroid discovered by Bill Yeung at the Desert Eagle Observatory in 2001, was named in honor of Koo.

On May 20, 2021, Weibo Starlight Awards 2020 ceremony was held online. The winners were all over the world, including Koo, Katy Perry, Taylor Swift, Takuya Kimura, etc. Koo, was awarded the "Starlight of Fame (Hong Kong, Macau and Taiwan)" and "Starlight Influential Actor of the Year".

In 2023, Koo was honoured by New York Asian Film Festival with Extraordinary Star Asia Award.
