= Troublesome Night =

1997 Hong Kong film by Steve Cheng, Victor Tam and Herman Yau

- Film poster

Chinese name
- Traditional Chinese: 陰陽路
- Simplified Chinese: 阴阳路
Transcriptions
Standard Mandarin
- Hanyu Pinyin: Yīn Yáng Lù
Yue: Cantonese
- Jyutping: Jam1 Joeng4 Lou6
- Directed by: Steve Cheng; Victor Tam; Herman Yau
- Written by: Kenneth Lau; Chau Ting; Yeung Woon-choi
- Produced by: Nam Yin
- Starring: Louis Koo; Ada Choi; Teresa Mak; Frankie Ng; Christy Chung; Sunny Chan; Christine Ng
- Cinematography: Joe Chan
- Edited by: Chan Kei-hop
- Music by: Mak Chun Hung
- Production companies: CBE Colour Business Entertainment Ltd. Nam Yin Production Co., Ltd.
- Release date: 10 May 1997
- Running time: 98 minutes
- Country: Hong Kong
- Language: Cantonese
- Box office: HK$5,964,440

Troublesome Night (Chinese: 陰陽路; lit. 'Yin Yang Road') is a 1997 Hong Kong comedy horror film produced by Nam Yin and directed by Steve Cheng, Victor Tam and Herman Yau. It is the first of 20 films in the Troublesome Night film series.

== Plot ==
The film is set in Hong Kong, with four loosely connected stories in one film.

A group of youngsters go on a camping trip in the countryside, where Ken encounters a mysterious woman near a grave. After the encounter, his life changes as he becomes a victim of the supernatural. As his friends return to Hong Kong without him, another story begins.

Mrs To has made arrangements to celebrate her wedding anniversary with her husband but he does not show up. The outcome of the second story leads to another story about Ken's friend, Jojo, having a romantic affair with a ghost. The fourth story is about Peter Butt visiting a haunted theatre with some of Ken's friends.

== Cast ==
- Simon Lui as Peter
- Louis Koo as Ken
- Allen Ting as Ball
- Jason Chu as Bee
- Ada Choi as Ken's love interest
- Teresa Mak as Jojo
- Pak Kar-sin as fat girl
- Law Lan as ghostly granny
- Lee Lik-chi as director
- Frankie Ng as Ng Tai-hung
- Kingdom Yuen as Sister Dan
- Christy Chung as Mrs. To
- Sunny Chan as To Ka-ming
- Hui Fan as antique shop boss
- Lee Siu-kei as Dr. Ho
- Christine Ng as May
- Ivy Leung as ghost in theatre
- Kenix Kwok as Ann
- Lui Tat at Uncle Ho
- Hau Woon-ling as boat woman

== See also ==
- Vengeful ghost
