= Halina Tam =

Hong Kong model, actress and singer

- Born: 6 September 1972 (age 54); Hong Kong
- Occupations: Actress; model; singer
- Years active: 1994–present
- Spouse: Eric Choi (m. 2007)

Chinese name
- Traditional Chinese: 譚小環
Transcriptions

Halina Tam
- Traditional Chinese: 譚小環
- Simplified Chinese: 谭小环
Transcriptions
Standard Mandarin
- Hanyu Pinyin: Tán Xiǎohuán
Yue: Cantonese
- Yale Romanization: Tàahm Síuwàahn

Halina Tam Siu-Wan, also known as May (born 6 September 1972) is a model, singer and actress. She is best known for her role in Legend of the Demigods and The Gentle Crackdown with co-star Wayne Lai.

== Career ==
Tam was the winner of the Miss Hong Kong Pageant 1994. She went on to represent Hong Kong at the Miss Chinese International 1995 pageant where she placed in the top 5, resulting in a berth at Miss Universe 1995 where she placed 45th. She had a singing career with BMG (Hong Kong) in 1997 and worked as an actress with TVB in Hong Kong. She also hosted Leisure and Pleasure from 2008 to 2010 and co-hosted Destiny and Beyond for the network. She left TVB after 18 years of working for the network, having last appeared on screen in 2012.

== Personal life ==
Halina married her boyfriend Eric Choi on 11 September 2007. She opened her first craft supplies store in 2013 and continued with a small snack shop in Causeway Bay in March 2014. Since December 2024, Tam and Choi had emigrated to Canada to open a restaurant in Markham, Ontario.

== Filmography ==
=== Films ===
- Young and Dangerous 2 (1996)
- Young and Dangerous 3 (1996)
- Troublesome Night 8 (2000)
- Troublesome Night 9 (2001)
- Troublesome Night 11 (2001)
- Dance of a Dream (2001)

Television
Year	English title	Chinese title	Role	Notes
1993	Mind Our Own Business	開心華之里		Guest star
1996	Nothing to Declare	緝私群英		
1996	Night Journey	殭屍福星		
2001	Virtues of Harmony	皆大歡喜		
2001	Law Enforcers	勇探實錄	Jackie Wong	
2002	Invisible Journey	彩色世界	Fanny	
2003	The King of Yesterday and Tomorrow	九五至尊	Tina Wan	
2003	Witness to a Prosecution II	洗冤錄II	Yuen Yuk-po	
2003	Virtues of Harmony II	皆大歡喜 (時裝版)		Guest star
2003	Greed Mask	謎情家族	Lok Pui-pui	
2003	The 'W' Files	衞斯理	Pa-chu	
2003	Better-halves	金牌冰人		
2003	The Driving Power	非常外父		
2004	ICAC Investigators 2004	廉政行動2004	Yasmin	
2004	Shades of Truth	水滸無間道	Janet	
2005	Wong Fei Hung – Master of Kung Fu	我師傅係黃飛鴻	Luk Yuet-ho	
2005	The Gentle Crackdown	秀才遇着兵	Luk Sau-koo	
2005	Healing Hands III	妙手仁心III	Phoebe	
2005	Women on the Run	窈窕熟女	Wong Mei-yin	
2005	Treasure Raiders	蕭十一郎		
2006	Trimming Success	飛短留長父子兵	Lam Wai-ji	Nominated – TVB Anniversary Award for Best Supporting Actress (Top 20)
2006	War and Destiny	亂世佳人	Luk Yin-chun	
2006	Maiden's Vow	鳳凰四重奏	Mrs. Mok Chun	
2006	At Home With Love	樓住有情人	Joey Chow	
2006	Glittering Days	東方之珠	Fei Fei	Nominated – TVB Anniversary Award for Best Supporting Actress (Top 10)
2007	Fathers and Sons	爸爸閉翳	Ching Yeuk-szi	
2008	A Journey Called Life	金石良緣	Tin Na	
2008	Legend of the Demigods	搜神傳	Mo Kik Tin Chuen	
2008	The Four	少年四大名捕	Piao Xue	
2009	Sweetness in the Salt	碧血鹽梟	Wu Ting-bik	
2009	The King of Snooker	桌球天王	Mary	
2009	ICAC Investigators 2009	廉政行動2009	Rainy Lam	
2010	Every Move You Make	讀心神探	Daisy Liu	Guest star
2011	Forensic Heroes III	法證先鋒III	Bonnie Yiu	Guest star

== Albums ==
- 自主 (1997)
- 被爱 (1997)
- 最差情人 (1998)

Achievements
Preceded by Hoyan Mok	Miss Hong Kong; 1994	Succeeded by Winnie Yeung
