= Herman Yau =

Hong Kong film director (born 1961)

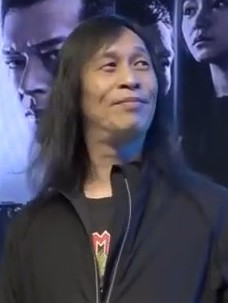
- Yau in 2019
- Born: 13 July 1961 (age 65); British Hong Kong
- Occupations: Film director; screenwriter; cinematographer

Herman Yau Lai-to (Chinese: 邱禮濤; born 13 July 1961) is a Hong Kong filmmaker.

== Filmography ==
=== As director ===
- 1987: No Regret – Director
- 1991: Don't Fool Me – Director
- 1992: Best of the Best – Director
- 1993: No More Love, No More Death – Director/Cinematographer
- 1993: The Untold Story – Director
- 1993: Taxi Hunter – Director/Scriptwriter
- 1994: Don't Shoot Me, I'm Just A Violinist! – Co-director
- 1994: Fearless Match – Director
- 1994: Cop Image – Director
- 1995: No Justice For All – Director
- 1995: City Cop II – Director
- 1995: There's Rock'n Roll in China – Director/Editor
- 1996: All of a Sudden – Director
- 1996: Ebola Syndrome – Director
- 1996: Adventurous Treasure Island – Co-director
- 1996: War of the Underworld – Director
- 1997: Walk In – Director
- 1997: Troublesome Night – Co-director
- 1997: Troublesome Night II – Director
- 1998: Troublesome Night III – Director
- 1998: Troublesome Night IV – Director
- 1999: Troublesome Night V – Director
- 1999: Fascination Amour – Director
- 1999: Troublesome Night VI – Director
- 1999: The Untold Story III – Director
- 1999: The Masked Prosecutor – Director
- 2001: Master Q 2001 – Director/Scriptwriter
- 2001: From the Queen to the Chief Executive – Director
- 2001: Nightmares in Precinct 7 – Director/Scriptwriter
- 2001: Killing End – Director/Scriptwriter
- 2002: Happy Family – Director/Scriptwriter
- 2002: Shark Busters – Director
- 2003: Give Them a Chance – Director/Scriptwriter
- 2004: Herbal Tea – Director/Scriptwriter
- 2004: Papa Loves You – Director/Scriptwriter
- 2004: Astonishing – Director/Scriptwriter
- 2004: Dating Death – Director/Scriptwriter
- 2006: Cocktail – Co-director
- 2006: Lethal Ninja – Director/Scriptwriter
- 2006: On the Edge – Director/Scriptwriter
- 2007: Whispers and Moans – Director
- 2008: True Women For Sale – Director
- 2008: Gong Tau: An Oriental Black Magic – Director
- 2009: Rebellion – Director
- 2009: Turning Point – Director
- 2010: The Legend is Born – Ip Man – Director
- 2010: All's Well, Ends Well Too 2010 – Director
- 2011: The Woman Knight of Mirror Lake – Director
- 2011: Turning Point 2 – Director
- 2012: Nightmare – Director/Scriptwriter
- 2012: Love Lifting – Director
- 2013: Ip Man: The Final Fight – Director
- 2014: Kung Fu Angels – Director
- 2014: The Second Coming – Director
- 2015: An Inspector Calls – Co-director
- 2015: Sara – Director
- 2016: The Mobfathers - Director
- 2016: Nessun Dorma - Director
- 2017: Shock Wave - Director/Scriptwriter
- 2017: The Sleep Curse - Director
- 2017: 77 Heartbreaks - Director
- 2017: Always Be With You - Director, screenwriter
- 2018: The Leakers - Director
- 2019: A Home with a View - Director
- 2019: The White Storm 2: Drug Lords - Director
- 2020: Shock Wave 2 - Director/Scriptwriter
- 2021: 77 Heartwarmings - Director
- 2023: The White Storm 3: Heaven or Hell - Director/Scriptwriter
- 2023: Death Notice - Director
- 2023: Raid on the Lethal Zone - Director
- 2023: Moscow Mission - Director
- 2024: Customs Frontline - Director
- 2024: Crisis Negotiators - Director
- 2025: A Gilded Game - Director
- 2026: We're Nothing At All - Director/Writer
- TBD: Shock Wave 3 - Director

=== Others ===
- 1987: Tragic Hero – Co-Cinematographer
- 1988: The Truth – Cinematographer
- 1988: Reunion – Cinematographer/Music
- 1988: Law or Justice – Cinematographer
- 1989: Triads: The Inside Story – Cinematographer
- 1989: Sentenced to Hang – Cinematographer
- 1989: Stars and Roses – Cinematographer
- 1990: Vampire Kids – Co-Cinematographer
- 1990: Fantasy Romance – Cinematographer
- 1991: Freedom Run Q – Cinematographer
- 1991: My Flying Wife – Cinematographer
- 1991: The Magic Touch – Cinematographer
- 1992: Cageman – Actor
- 1992: With or Without You – Cinematographer
- 1992: Deadly Dream Woman – Cinematographer
- 1994: Twenty Something – Co-Cinematographer
- 1995: Highway Man II – Co-Cinematographer
- 1995: Red Zone – Cinematographer
- 1996: Best of the Best – Actor
- 1997: 97 Aces Go Places – Cinematographer
- 1998: 9413… – Producer/Cinematographer
- 2000: Crying Heart – Cinematographer
- 2000: Time and Tide – Co-Cinematographer
- 2003: Happy Go Lucky – Cinematographer
- 2005: Himalaya Singh – 2nd Unit Director
- 2005: The Unusual Youth – Producer/Cinematographer
- 2005: Seven Swords – Co-Cinematographer
- 2006: Love @ First Note – Producer/Cinematographer
- 2006: Fatal Contact – Producer/Cinematographer
- 2009: Permanent Residence – Cinematographer
- 2011: Love Actually... Sucks! – Cinematography
