= Teresa Mak =

Hong Kong actress

- Born: Mak Ka-kei; 1 August 1975 (age 51); British Hong Kong
- Occupation: Actress
- Years active: 1993–2008; 2014–present
- Spouse: Wong Kwok Ho (m. 2006)
- Children: 3

Teresa Mak Ka-kei (麥家琪) is a Hong Kong actress signed to ATV.

Mak competed in the 1993 Miss Hong Kong Pageant. She managed to get into the finals of the competition but her nude photos were leaked just prior to the finals. She was eventually eliminated from the competition. After the competition, Mak was offered a contract by TVB.

== Personal life ==
Mak married Wong Kwok Ho in 2006 and they have three children.

== Filmography ==
- Mind Our Own Business (1993)
- Mermaid Got Married as Kiki (1994)
- Easy Money as Dee (1994)
- Passion 1995 as Gucci (1994)
- Sexy and Dangerous as Little Star (1996)
- Street of Fury as Shan
- Troublesome Night as JoJo (1997)
- Erotic Ghost Story - Perfect Match as Evil Queen of Heaven (1997)
- The Legendary 'Tai Fei' as Sis Kei (1999)
- Troublesome Night 11 as Lan Sau Wan (2001)
- Love Me, Love My Money as Fong (2001)
- Martial Angels as Goldfish (2001)
- Troublesome Night 17 (2002)
- The Peeping (2002)
- The Gigolo 2 (2016)
- Happiness (2016)
- Sisterhood (2016)
- To Love or Not to Love (2017)
- The First Girl I Loved (2021)
