= Law Lan =

Hong Kong actress (born 1934)

Law Lan MH
- 羅蘭
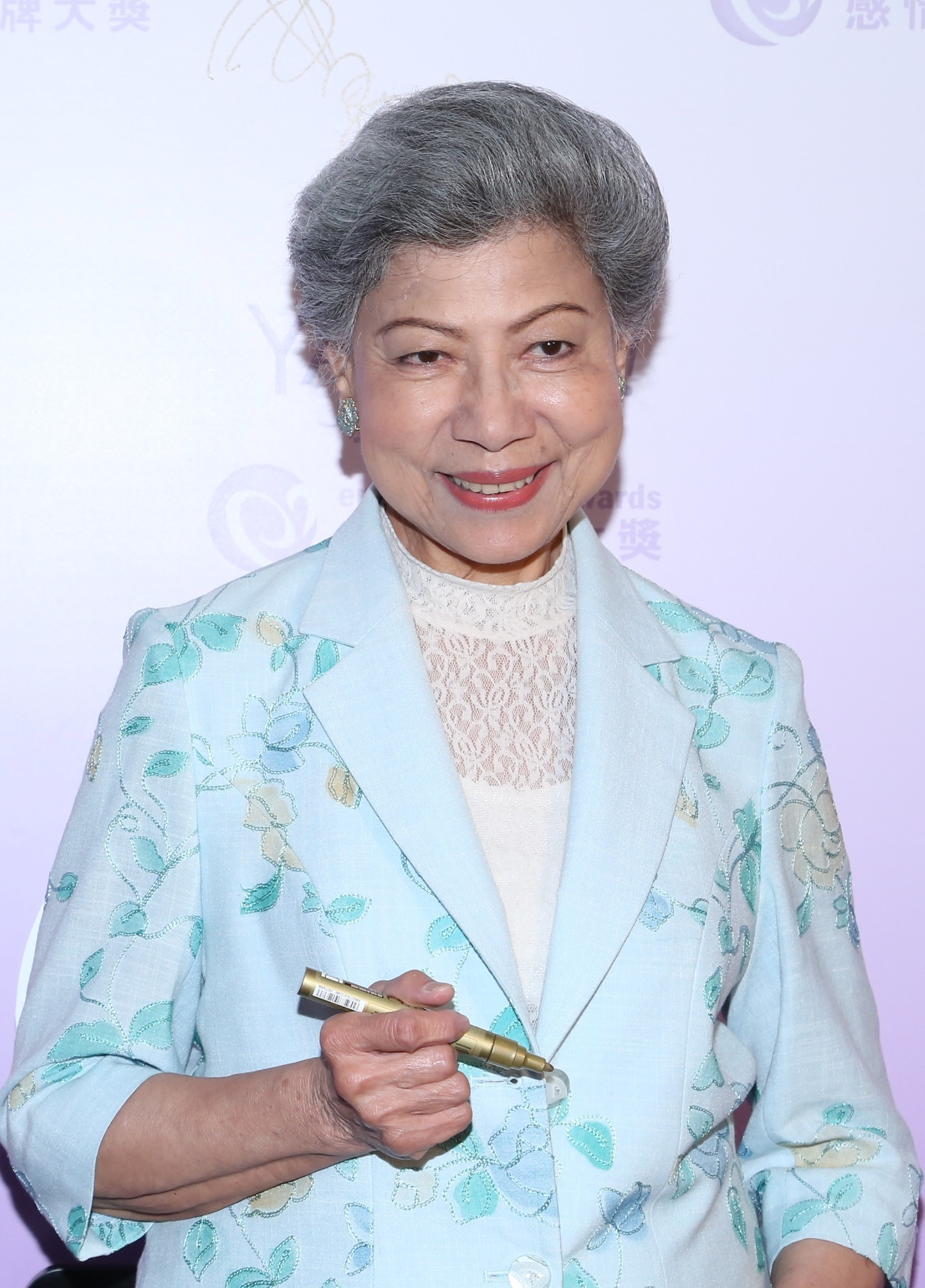
- Law in 2017
- Born: Lo Yin-ying; 13 November 1934 (age 91); British Hong Kong
- Occupation: Actress
- Years active: 1939–present
- Awards: Hong Kong Film Awards – Best Actress; 2000 Bullets Over Summer Golden Bauhinia Awards – Best Supporting Actress; 2000 Bullets Over Summer Hong Kong Film Critics Society Awards – Best Actress; 2000 Bullets Over Summer TVB Anniversary Awards – Life Achievement Award; 2002 Lifetime Achievement

Chinese name
- Traditional Chinese: 羅蘭
- Simplified Chinese: 罗兰
Transcriptions
Standard Mandarin
- Hanyu Pinyin: Luó lán
Yue: Cantonese
- Jyutping: Lo4 Laan4

Lo Yin-ying
- Traditional Chinese: 盧燕英
- Simplified Chinese: 卢燕英
Transcriptions
Standard Mandarin
- Hanyu Pinyin: Lú Yànyīng

Helena Law Lan (Chinese: 羅蘭) (born Lo Yin-ying (盧燕英); 13 November 1934), is a veteran Hong Kong actress in both the film and TV industry.

== Career ==
She started in the film industry in 1939, cast in antagonistic roles during the black and white film era. It was during this time that she took the stage name of "Law Lan" based on the advice of her boss because he said the name was reminiscent of Shanghai socialites (交際花), and this name better suited the type of roles that she played.

In 1971, Law joined TVB and took part in numerous drama series. Here, she played a variety of different characters instead of only being cast in antagonistic roles as she had previously. She also took part in the popular nightly variety show, Enjoy Yourself Tonight, which included skits, singing, dancing, and variety games, filmed in front of a live audience.

Law has also been cast as a spirit medium in more than 36 Hong Kong horror films. Law's performance as 四婆 (lit. fourth granny) in the film, Bullets Over Summer, garnered her the "Best Actress" award at the 19th Hong Kong Film Award in 2000, making her the oldest winner of this coveted award.

Law has starred in over 300 movies and television dramas throughout her career.

== Personal life ==
Law's father died during World War II aged 34 after complications from opium withdrawals. She has been living alone since 1994 when her mother died, thus saving her from immigrating to Canada. There is a fake rumour being disseminated online that Law's mother is of Indian heritage. On 30th June 2026 she appeared on Canton province's Pearl River Channel (珠江频道) entertainment interview and clarified that both her parents came from Shunde, Guangdong and are pure blooded Chinese. The interview was also aired on Chinese social media platform, WeChat. According to Law,her mother had emigrated to Indonesia at age 14. In the program, Law even shared the photos of both her parents.

Law is a devout Catholic. She is often asked about the contradiction of portraying characters such as Chinese mediums and exorcists helping to contact the deceased from the underworld as opposed to her Christian faith. Law said she has consulted the priest on this and was assured that she was just performing her role for her audience and as long as she remains faithful in Christ, then it should not matter.

== Filmography ==
=== Television dramas ===
Year	Title	Role	Notes/Ref.
1976	Hotel	Mrs. Chui	
1977	A House Is Not a Home		
1978	The Giant		
1978	Conflict		
1979	Chor Lau-heung	So Sam-tse	
1979	The Good, the Bad and the Ugly		
1980	The Brothers		
1981	Young's Female Warrior		
1982	You Only Live Twice		
1983	The Return of the Condor Heroes	Kau Chin-chak	
1985	The Flying Fox of Snowy Mountain	Old Mrs Seung	
1985	Take Care, Your Highness!	Granny	
1988	Two Most Honorable Knights	Granny Fa	
1993	The Buddhism Palm Strikes Back	Tin-yan	
1995	The Condor Heroes 95	Kau Chin-chak	
1996	Journey to the West	Spider Demon (Shishi and En'en's mother)	
1997	Drunken Angels	Law Siu Lan	
1998	Journey to the West II	Spider Demon (En'en), Golden and Silver Horned Kings' mother	
1998	State of Divinity	Ting-yat	
1998	The Duke of Mount Deer	Kwai Yee-neung	
2000	Crimson Sabre	Wan Fong-san's wife	
2001	Gods of Honour	Yiu Tin-heung	
2001	Colourful Life	Aunt Lau Yi	
2003	The 'W' Files	Mrs Cheng	
2003	Ups and Downs in the Sea of Love	Grandmother Wah	
2003	Triumph in the Skies		
2004	Angels of Mission		
2004	The Last Breakthrough	Chow Kuk	
2004	Summer Heat	Mo Ah-Lui	
2005	Wong Fei Hung - Master of Kung Fu		
2005	The Academy		
2005	Just Love		
2005	Central Affairs		
2008	When East Meets West		
2011	Police Station No.7		
2012	The Hippocratic Crush	Ho Dai Tai	
2012	The Last Steep Aliment	Leung Mei Kuen	Nominated – TVB Anniversary Award for Best Supporting Actress
2012	The Stamp of Love		
2012	Missing You	Hui Yuk Mui	
2013	Inbound Troubles	Lai Hiu Lan	
2013	Awfully Lawful	Lady Lauren	
2013	Karma Rider	Lang-Nu aka Pretty	
2014	Come On, Cousin	Fong Gwai Lan	
2014	Tiger Cubs II	Tin Po Po	
2014–2015	Officer Geomancer		
2015	Eye in the Sky	Ho Ye-gu	
2015	Brick Slaves	Kimchi Wong Kam-hei	
2016	The Last Healer in Forbidden City	Empress Dowager Cixi	
2016	Blue Veins	Lam Wong Chi-hung	
2016	House of Spirits	Mrs. Bak – Yi Lan	
2016	No Reserve	a village old lady	
2016	Come with Me	Lee Ho	
2017	The Exorcist's Meter	Lung Por	Guest Appearance in Ep. 1
2018	Life on the Line	Lee Ying-oi	
2020	Forensic Heroes IV	Chiu Shuk-kuen	
2020	The Exorcist's 2nd Meter	Lung Por	Guest Appearance in Ep. 10, 25
2020	Death By Zero	Sophia	
2020	Legal Mavericks 2020	Kam Lan	
2021	Sinister Beings	Sung Tat’s grandmother	Special Appearance
2021	Battle of the Seven Sisters	as themself	Cameo ep. 7
2021–2022	Hello Missfortune	Lam Sze-mei	
2023	Speakers of Law		Special Appearance
2025	The Fading Gold	Fong Luk-siu-kwan	

=== Film ===
- The Kid (1950)
- Story of the White-Haired Demon Girl (1959)
- Les Belles (1961)
- Young, Pregnant and Unmarried (1968)
- Lucky Seven (1970)
- The House of 72 Tenants (1972)
- Police Woman (1973)
- Games Gamblers Play (1974)
- Aces Go Places 3 (1984)
- The Greatest Lover (1988)
- The Bride with White Hair 2 (1993)
- Troublesome Night (1997)
- Haunted Mansion (1998)
- Troublesome Night 3 (1998)
- Bullets Over Summer (1999)
- Troublesome Night 5 (1999)
- Troublesome Night 6 (1999)
- Troublesome Night 7 (2000)
- Troublesome Night 8 (2000)
- Troublesome Night 9 (2001)
- Troublesome Night 10 (2001)
- Troublesome Night 11 (2001)
- Troublesome Night 12 (2001)
- Troublesome Night 13 (2002)
- Troublesome Night 14 (2002)
- Troublesome Night 15 (2002)
- Troublesome Night 16 (2002)
- Troublesome Night 17 (2002)
- Troublesome Night 18 (2003)
- Troublesome Night 19 (2003)
- The Unusual Youth (2005)
- Don't Open Your Eyes (2006)
- Flash Point (2007)
- The Haunting Lover (2010)
- A Simple Life (2011)
- Blue Magic (2013)
- The White Storm (2013)
- Overheard 3 (2014)
- Flirting in the Air (2014)
- Tales of Mystery (2015)
- An Inspector Calls (2015)
- Are You Here (2015)
- Big Fortune Hotel (2015)
- Heaven in the Dark (2016)
- Cook Up a Storm (2017)
- Always Be With You (2017)
- Agent Mr Chan (2018)
- A Beautiful Moment (2018)
- Hotel Soul Good (2018)
- I Love You, You're Perfect, Now Change! (2019)
- Girl Dorm (2019)

== Honours and awards ==
- Medal of Honour (2002)

=== Hong Kong Film Critics Society Awards ===
- Best Actress for Bullets Over Summer (2000)

=== Hong Kong Film Awards ===
- Best Supporting Actress Nomination for Thou Shalt Not Swear (1994)
- Best Supporting Actress Nomination for 13 July (1997)
- Best Actress for Bullets Over Summer (2000)

=== Golden Bauhinia Awards ===
- Best Supporting Actress for Bullets Over Summer (2000)

=== TVB Anniversary Awards ===
- Life Achievement Award (2002)
