= Simon Lui =

Hong Kong actor (1964–2026)

- 雷宇扬
- Born: 8 July 1964; British Hong Kong
- Died: 7 September 2026 (aged 62); Guangzhou, China
- Occupation: Actor
- Years active: 1990–2019

Simon Lui Yue Yeung (Chinese: 雷宇扬; 8 July 1964 – 7 September 2026), also known as Simon Loui and Simon Yu, was a Hong Kong actor best known for starring in many low-budget and/or horror films from the early 1990s.

== Life and career ==
Lui was born on 8 July 1964. He enrolled in TVB's artiste training program in 1988. Lui began drawing attention when he was featured in the Troublesome Night film series. Over time, he became a mainstay in Hong Kong horror cinema; he was dubbed the "King of Ghosts" for his association with the genre. Lui died from cancer on 7 September 2026, at the age of 62.

== Filmography ==
- Dragon Action Secret Code (2019)
- A Beautiful Moment (2018)
- Paris Holiday (2015)
- Vulgaria (2012)
- Feel It Say It... (2006)
- Loss of Memory (2006)
- The Corpse Spirit Is Pressing (2005)
- A Knife-Shooter (2005)
- Escape from Hong Kong Island (2004) {Director}
- Herbal Tea (2004) Producer, Writer, Actor
- I.T. Story (2004) Actor
- Super Model (2004) Actor
- Troublesome Night 19 (2003)
- Troublesome Night 18 (2003)
- Happy Family (2002) Actor
- Troublesome Night 17 (2002)
- Troublesome Night 16 (2002)
- Troublesome Night 9 (2001)
- Conspiracy (2000)
- Troublesome Night 8 (2000)
- Troublesome Night 7 (2000)
- Last Ghost Standing (1999) – Yang Yang
- Troublesome Night 6 (1999)
- Troublesome Night 5 (1999)
- The Doctor in Spite of Himself (1999)
- Troublesome Night 4 (1998)
- Troublesome Night 3 (1998)
- Troublesome Night 2 (1997)
- Troublesome Night (1997)
- Banana Club (1996) – Yue Yeung
