= Dennis Law =

Hong Kong film producer, screenwriter, actor, director and presenter

- Born: Dennis Law Sau-yiu; 19 February 1963 (age 63); Hong Kong
- Occupations: Film director; film producer; screenwriter; presenter; actor
- Children: Yoyo Law
- Awards: Hong Kong Film Awards – Best Film; 2006 Election

Chinese name
- Traditional Chinese: 羅守耀
- Simplified Chinese: 罗守耀
Transcriptions
Standard Mandarin
- Hanyu Pinyin: luo2 shou3 yao4
Yue: Cantonese
- Jyutping: lo4 sau2 yiu6

Dennis Law Sau-yiu (born 19 February 1963) is a Hong Kong film producer, screenwriter, actor, director and presenter. He is the former chairman and executive director of Milkyway Image, and a founder of its subsidiary company Point of View Movie Production Co. Ltd. Films directed by Law include teen comedies such as The Unusual Youth and Love @ First Note, and martial arts action films that include Fatal Contact and Fatal Move.

== Early life ==
Law studied filmmaking at university in Los Angeles. He holds a Bachelor of Arts Degree in Communications from Loyola Marymount University. Prior to that, he completed his high school at Albert College in Belleville, Canada.

== Career ==
On his return to Hong Kong, rather than pursue his career in film, Law decided to go into real estate. He later befriended Charles Heung, who advised him to learn from veteran filmmakers such as Herman Yau. In 2003, Law befriended prolific filmmaker Johnnie To and became his financial partner at Milkyway Image, serving as a chairman and executive director. Law had many opportunities to travel to the world's film markets and festivals, meet film industry personnel from different parts of the globe, find out their views of Hong Kong cinema, as well as seeing To on set as a director. Apart from filmmaking, Law is currently a managing director of the Yu Tai Hing Company Ltd., which is a well-established private property investment and development group in Hong Kong.

Point of View Movie Production Co. Ltd.
- Type: Production company
- Industry: Film production
- Founded: 2005
- Founder: Dennis Law
- Headquarters: Hong Kong, China
- Key people: Dennis Law; Herman Yau
- Products: Films
- Parent: Brilliant Arts

=== Point of View Movie Production Co. Ltd. ===
Apart from producing Election with To in 2005, along with its 2006 sequel, Law formed his own production company, Point of View Movie Production Co. Ltd. (影視點制作有限公司), a subsidiary of Milkyway Image. Point of View was one of two companies established by Law after Milkyway Image split from its parent company, Brilliant Arts. Since its establishment, Point of View has notably been a frequent production partner for Charles Heung's company China Star Entertainment Group, producing films in which Law has served as a producer and director.

=== Films ===
Law made his directorial debut with the 2005 teen comedy-drama The Unusual Youth. Law's next two films saw the director collaborating with entertainers managed by Gold Label Records. He wrote, produced and directed the teen comedy, Love @ First Note, which starred Justin Lo, Kary Ng, Stephy Tang and Miki Yeung. He later made the martial arts romance film Fatal Contact, hoping to establish his lead actor Wu Jing as a martial arts icon. His next film was the 2008 film Fatal Move, which was originally his idea for a sequel to SPL: Sha Po Lang. The film featured an ensemble cast that included SPL stars Sammo Hung, Wu Jing and Simon Yam, and marked the return of veteran Hong Kong actor Danny Lee who once again plays a just policeman in the film. Of the casting, Law wanted to cast a series of familiar Hong Kong actors as the film was aimed at a foreign market.

Upon its release, Fatal Move was awarded a Category III rating in Hong Kong for its extreme violence. His next film was A Very Short Life, a film about child abuse and molestation. The film was also awarded with a Category III rating for its subject matter.

== Trademarks ==
Law uses the same production crew for all of his films as well as having an ensemble cast of popular Chinese actors. Law also uses computer-generated imagery to create blood, as seen in films such as A Very Short Life and Fatal Move.

=== Recurring actors ===
Actor	The Unusual Youth (2005)	Love @ First Note (2006)	Fatal Contact (2006)	Fatal Move (2007)	A Very Short Life (2009)	Bad Blood (2010)	Womb Ghosts (2010)
Lam Suet	X mark	X mark	X mark	X mark		X mark	X mark
Simon Yam	X mark			X mark		X mark	
Wu Jing			X mark	X mark			
Maggie Siu				X mark	X mark		X mark
Hui Shiu-Hung			X mark	X mark	X mark		
Cheung Siu-Fai	X mark		X mark	X mark	X mark	X mark	
Miki Yeung		X mark	X mark				
Theresa Fu		X mark	X mark				
Tien Niu		X mark		X mark			
Ken Lo			X mark	X mark		X mark	
Pinky Cheung				X mark	X mark	X mark	
Marco Lok	X mark			X mark			
Johnny Lu	X mark		X mark	X mark			
Wong Tin-Lam				X mark		X mark	
Lai Lok Yi						X mark	X mark

== Filmography ==
Year	Film	Chinese title	Role	Notes
2005	Election	黑社會	Producer and presenter	
2005	The Unusual Youth	非常青春期	Writer, producer, director and presenter	
2006	Election 2	黑社會以和為貴	Producer and executive producer	Also known as Triad Election
2006	Love @ First Note	戀愛初歌	Writer, producer, director and presenter	
2006	Fatal Contact	黑拳	Writer, producer, director and executive producer	
2006	The Shopaholics	最愛女人購物狂	"Property developer"	Cameo appearance
2007	Gong Tau	降頭	Producer and executive producer	Also known as Gong Tau: An Oriental Black Magic
2007	Triangle	鐵三角	Executive producer	
2008	Fatal Move	奪帥	Writer, producer, director and executive producer	
2009	A Very Short Life	短暫的生命	Writer, producer, director and executive producer	
2010	Bad Blood	滅門	Writer, producer, director	
2010	Womb Ghosts	惡胎	Director	
2010	Vampire Warriors	殭屍新戰士	Director	
2013	The Constable	衝鋒戰警	Director	
