= Fatal Move =

2008 Hong Kong film by Dennis Law

- Promotional poster
- Directed by: Dennis Law
- Written by: Dennis Law
- Produced by: Dennis Law
- Starring: Sammo Hung; Simon Yam; Wu Jing; Danny Lee
- Cinematography: Herman Yau
- Edited by: Yau Chi-wai
- Music by: Tommy Wai
- Production companies: Point of View Movie Production Co. Ltd. One Hundred Years of Film
- Distributed by: China Star Entertainment Group (Hong Kong); Cathay-Keris Films (Singapore)
- Release date: 28 February 2008
- Running time: 116 minutes
- Country: Hong Kong
- Languages: Cantonese; English

Fatal Move (traditional Chinese: 奪帥; simplified Chinese: 夺帅, released in the United States as Triad Wars) is a 2008 Hong Kong action film written, produced and directed by Dennis Law. The film stars Sammo Hung, Simon Yam and Wu Jing, who reunite after 2005's SPL: Sha Po Lang.

The film focuses on a Triad gang led by brothers Lin Ho-Lung and Lin Ho-Tung (Hung and Yam), which faces a series of double crossings, and violent misfortunes. Danny Lee co-stars in the film, returning in his first feature film role after four years, once again playing a Hong Kong police officer. The film was released on 28 February 2008.

== Plot ==
Triad boss Lin Ho-lung (Sammo Hung) is celebrating his son's first birthday, a child conceived by his mistress. The party is interrupted when Police Inspector Liu Chi-chung (Danny Lee) arrives outside of the club with his colleagues, warning the gang to stop throwing any parties without the police's consent.

Police officers raid a drug shipment involving Lin Ho-tung (Simon Yam), Lung's right-hand man and assassin, Lok Tin-hung (Wu Jing), and Wu (Ken Lo), a drug dealer. A gunfight ensues between the police and triads, resulting in Wu’s arrest. Wu remains uncooperative with the police and his wife Tracy (Pinky Cheung) talks with Lung's wife Soso (Tien Niu), threatening to have Wu expose Lung's gang if she does not receive $20 million. Later that night, Tung and Tin-hung torture Tracy, who reveals that the threat was bogus and that her secret lover coerced her into creating a lie so she could flee with him once she had received the money. The gang executes Tracy’s lover, and breaks into police headquarters to assassinate Wu. Various police officers and Triad gang members are killed as the Triads try to escape the precinct.

It is revealed that Soso and gang member Law Ting-Fat are blackmailing Lung and his gang. They orchestrate a kidnapping of Lung's financial backer, Uncle Yu (Hui Shiu-hung). After receiving $200 million from Lung, Soso and Fat kill the hired kidnappers and Uncle Yu to cover their tracks.

Lung and Tung eventually start a war against a rival triad gang whom they suspect is responsible for the murder. Later, Lung has a meeting with his rival, Flirt (Tam Ping-man), a gang leader who reveals he had nothing to do with Yu’s death. Tung learns about Soso and Fat's role in Yu's killing. Lung goes after the couple, resulting in a shootout. Soso and Fat's men are killed, while Tung executes Fat. Lung catches up to Soso whom he refuses to kill, after she expresses her bitterness about her inability to conceive and Lung's decision to have a child with a mistress. She is later arrested by the police.

Lung and Tin-hung are trapped in a warehouse and surrounded by the police outside. Knowing that they will be unable to escape, Tin-Hung mentions that he was never convinced by the stories that claim Lung was an "invincible fighter." Lung accepts Tin-hung's challenge. The fight ends with Lung impaling Tin-hung with a pipe. While dying, Tin-hung expresses that he forgives Lung, and hopes that he will soon join him after he dies. Refusing to surrender to the police, Lung walks out of the warehouse, armed with machine guns. He intimidates the police by firing the weapons in the air, and is shot to death.

While Soso is serving prison time, assassins disguised as painters slit her throat. Tung attempts to flee with Lung's mistress and their baby son. They arrive at a beach, presumably to escape via boat. Tung asks her to wait while he looks for the means of escape. A person approaches the mistress and her son. Separately, someone also walks up to Tung, who closes his eyes. A gun with a silencer is shown.

The film ends with the words: "Those who follow their destiny meet with sorrows, while those who resist their destiny meet with death."

== Cast ==
- Sammo Hung as Lin Ho-lung
- Simon Yam as Lin Ho-tung
- Tien Niu as Leung Yuet-lin / Soso
- Carisa Yan as Lisa
- Danny Lee as Senior Inspector Liu Chi-chung
- Maggie Shiu as Inspector Janet Liu Mei-chun
- Wu Jing as Lok Tin-hung
- Cheung Siu-fai as Law Ting-fat
- Ken Lo as Lau Kwok-wai / Wu
- Hui Shiu-hung as 'Uncle' Tong Lai-yu
- Fung Hak-on as 'Uncle' Li Chun-tong
- Johnny Lu as Jacky Ho Wing-kit
- Pinky Cheung as Tracy
- Lam Suet as Wong Shu-chor / 'Fat Ball'
- Wong Tin-lam as Ma Wing-ying / Uncle Dee
- Tam Ping-man as Flirt Lok Ki-cheong
- Jacky Heung as Kwok Chi-hang
- Anthony Carpio as Lung's Man (uncredited)
- Chan Tat-kwong as Soso's Man (uncredited)

== Production ==
Fatal Move reunites writer, producer and director Dennis Law, with initially the same crew and several actors he used to make the 2006 film Fatal Contact. The film is a Hong Kong production distributed by China Star Entertainment Group, and also produced by One Hundred Years of Film Co. Ltd., along with Law's production company Point of View Movie Production Co. Ltd. The film was executive produced by Charles Heung, whose son Jacky Heung appears in the film in a supporting role. Acclaimed Hong Kong filmmaker Herman Yau, who has frequently collaborated with Law and Heung, served as a cinematographer, while Nicky Li, a member of the Jackie Chan Stunt Team served as a fight and stunt choreographer. Fatal Move was shot with a budget of HK$20 million.

Law originally wanted the film to be a sequel to SPL: Sha Po Lang, which would focus on the Sammo Hung character for that film. Law then realized that the prequel sequel idea had limited potential, especially when he wanted to show the relationship between the Sammo Hung and Wu Jing characters from SPL. Though it has themes similar to SPL, and reunites Wu Jing and Sammo Hung, Law’s Fatal Move is a completely original work.

For his film, Law wanted to set his sights on North American audiences, by assembling a cast of familiar actors that are best known to them, such as Sammo Hung, Ken Lo, Simon Yam and Danny Lee. Law believes that the martial arts scenes are the strongest asset of Fatal Move, in particular, the major weapon fight scene between Sammo Hung and Wu Jing.

Filming occurred for two months in Hong Kong, beginning with production inauguration on 1 August 2007.

== Release ==
=== Category III rating ===
The film was awarded a Category III rating for its excessive amount of violence. The film was not given a release in Mainland China, since Law refused to compromise by editing a tamer version that conforms to their strict censorship.

=== Home media ===
DVD was released in Region 2 in the United Kingdom on 31 August 2009, it was distributed by Cine Asia.

== See also ==
- List of Hong Kong films
- Sammo Hung filmography
- Simon Yam filmography
- Wu Jing filmography
