= May Mok =

Hong Kong sound effects editor

May Mok Mei-Wah (Chinese: 莫美華; pinyin: Mò Měihuá; Jyutping: Mok6 Mei5waa4) is a Hong Kong award-winning sound effects editor, who also specializes in sound mixing, sound design, and ADR recording.

== Filmography ==
- Dead Slowly (2009) (sound mixer) (sound designer)
- Exiled (2006) (sound mixer) (sound designer)
- Election 2 (a.k.a. Triad Election) (sound designer) (sound mixer)
- 2 Become 1 (2006) (sound mixer) (sound designer)
- Love @ First Note (2006) (sound mixer) (sound designer)
- Fatal Contact (2006) (sound mixer) (sound designer)
- Election (2005) (sound designer) (sound mixer)
- The Unusual Youth (2005) (sound mixer) (sound designer)
- Yesterday Once More (2004) (sound designer) (sound mixer)
- Throw Down (2004) (sound designer) (sound mixer)
- McDull, prince de la bun (2004) (sound designer) (sound mixer)
- Breaking News (2004) (dialogue recordist) (sound mixer) (sound)
- Running on Karma (2003) (adr mixer) (sound effects editor)
- Turn Left, Turn Right (2003) (sound effects editor)
- PTU (2003) (adr editor) (adr recordist) (sound)
- Memory of Youth (2003) (sound designer) (sound mixer)
- Love for All Seasons (2003) (adr editor) (adr recordist) (sound effects editor)
- My Left Eye Sees Ghosts (2002) (adr editor) (adr recordist) (sound effects editor)
- Fat Choi Spirit (2002) (adr editor) (adr recordist) (sound effects editor)
- Second Time Around (2002) (sound effects editor)
- Vampire Hunters (a.k.a. The Era of Vampire) (2002) (adr editor) (adr recordist) (sound effects editor)
- Ghost Office (2002) (adr editor) (adr recordist) (sound effects editor)
- Running Out of Time 2 (2001) (adr editor) (adr recordist) (sound effects editor)
- My Life as McDull (2001) (sound designer) (sound mixer)
- The Legend of Zu (a.k.a. Zu Warriors) (2001) (sound effects editor)
- Running Out of Time 2 (2001) (adr editor) (adr recordist) (sound effects editor)
- Love on a Diet (2001) (sound effects editor) (sound engineer)
- Wu yen (2001) (sound editor)
- Let's Sing Along (2001) (adr editor) (adr recordist) (sound effects editor)
- Gimme Gimme (2001) (adr editor) (adr recordist) (sound effects editor)
- Runaway (2001 film) (adr editor) (adr recordist) (sound effects editor)
- Comeuppance (2000) (adr editor) (adr recordist) (sound effects editor)
- Time and Tide (2000) (assistant sound editor) (uncredited)
- Needing You... (2000) (sound editor)
- Spacked Out (2000) (sound)
- Help!!! (2000) (sound effects editor)
- The Mission (1999) (sound editor)
- Sealed With A Kiss (2000) (sound designer) (sound mixer)
- The Victim (2000) (location sound recordist) (adr recordist) (sound effects editor)
- Running Out of Time (1999) (boom operator) (sound effects editor)
- Where a Good Man Goes (1999) (boom operator) (sound editor)
- Option Zero (1998) (assistant boom operator) (uncredited)
- Task Force (1998) (assistant boom operator) (uncredited)
- Snapshots (1998) (location sound recordist) (sound designer)
