= A Very Short Life =

2009 Hong Kong film by Dennis Law

- Promotional poster
- Directed by: Dennis S.Y. Law
- Written by: Dennis S.Y. Law
- Produced by: Dennis S.Y. Law
- Starring: Leila Tong; Maggie Shiu; Pinky Cheung; Samuel Pang; Koni Lui
- Narrated by: Cheung Siu-Fai
- Cinematography: Herman Yau
- Edited by: Yau Chi-Wai
- Music by: Tommy Wai
- Production companies: Point of View Movie Production Co. Ltd. One Hundred Years of Film
- Distributed by: China Star Entertainment Group
- Release date: 19 March 2009
- Running time: 85 minutes
- Country: Hong Kong
- Languages: Cantonese; English
- Box office: $226,330

A Very Short Life (Chinese: 短暫的生命; pinyin: Duǎn Zàn Dé Shēng Mìng; Cantonese Yale: Dyun Jaam Dik Sang Ming) is a 2009 Hong Kong drama film written, produced and directed by Dennis Law. It is Law's fifth feature film as a writer and director. Centered on child abuse and child molestation, the film stars Maggie Shiu as a Hong Kong police commissioner who investigates the murder of an 11-year-old girl at the hands of her abusive mother (Leila Tong). The film was awarded a Category III rating in Hong Kong for its subject matter and was released in Hong Kong on 19 March 2009.

== Plot ==
In Hong Kong, Dennis Law, a property developer and filmmaker, attends a dinner party hosted by his attorney friend, Herman Lee. At the party, Dennis meets Cat Lam, a female police inspector who decides to tell him about a police investigation involving the murder of a young girl.

The story flashes back to when Cat meets Josephine Wong, a police commissioner who wishes to re-open an investigation involving the death of a young girl at the hands of her mother. She is joined by her female colleagues: Barbara, a criminologist; and Ivy, a police sergeant. Josephine decides to conduct an interrogation with the suspect, Becky Lee. Throughout the interrogation, Becky refuses to give a statement, and as a result, becomes subject to police brutality. Josephine and her colleagues leave her naked in the cold interrogation room, and later conduct a body cavity search.

Cat later tells how she became involved in the investigation. She arrives at a hospital to find the little girl, Ho Heiyi, lying unconscious and her body full of scars. She dies immediately before doctors can prepare for an operation. She later arrests Jo, Becky's boyfriend, who was caught trying to get rid of possible evidence on his computer. The police also find a series of burnt videotapes. Cat reveals that the tapes contained child pornography.

During the interrogation, it is revealed that Barbara and the other officers physically restrained Becky, while forcing her to watch one of the videotapes that features Jo raping her daughter. After the interrogation, a flashback reveals that Heiyi received the multiple scars after being physically beaten and whipped with a belt by Becky. While in her jail cell, Becky attempts suicide by cutting her wrists on a stone bed and later gnawing on the arteries.

At the hospital, Josephine decides to meet with Becky, who feels that a woman is born to give her body to men, and reveals she was sexually harassed and abused by her father at a young age before meeting various men and giving birth to Heiyi. She also reveals that she knew that Jo had been raping her daughter repeatedly. Using Buddhism beliefs, Josephine gives Becky advice by telling her that she should use her prison term to reform herself. The film ends with Josephine engaging in a friendly phone call with her daughter.

== Cast ==
- Leila Tong plays Becky Lee, an abusive mother who is being interrogated for the murder of her daughter. Kong described the scene in which her character slashes her wrists to commit suicide: "This scene showed me using the stone bed to commit suicide. It’s a combination of blood and meat. I was very serious and into the scene, and ended up screaming when I reached home." Kong admitted going into tears, since she was so into the scene.
- Maggie Shiu plays Josephine Wong, a merciless police commissioner investigating the murder case.
- Pinky Cheung plays Cat Lam, a police inspector who witnesses Becky's brutal interrogation, and acts as the storyteller of the film.
- Cheung Siu-Fai plays Dennis Law, a property developer and filmmaker, who meets Cat at a dinner party and learns about the murder investigation. The character is a fictional version of the film's director.
- Samuel Pang plays Jo, Becky's boyfriend, who is convicted for rape and molestation of the little girl.
- Koni Lui plays Barbara, the Chief of police and criminologist, who drives Becky to a suicidal and deadly path.
- Yoyo Law plays Heiyi Ho, the 11-year-old daughter of Becky, who is at the center of the murder investigation.
- Shermon Tang plays Ivy, a cruel and merciless police sergeant.
- Crystal Cheung plays Joey Wong, the daughter of Josephine, who wants to follow her family's footsteps and become a lawyer.
- Hui Shiu-Hung plays Herman Lee, Dennis' friend, who is an attorney.
- Angela Tong plays Herman Lee's older daughter.
- Snow Suen plays Herman's Lee's younger daughter.

== Production ==
A Very Short Life reunites writer, producer and director Dennis Law, with initially the same crew and several actors he used to make his previous four films. The film is a Hong Kong production distributed by China Star Entertainment Group, and produced by One Hundred Years of Film, along with Law's own production company Point of View Movie Production Co. Ltd. The film was executive produced by Law and Charles Heung, while Herman Yau served as a cinematographer and Tiffany Chen served as an administrative producer.
