= Fatal Contact (film) =

2006 Hong Kong film by Dennis Law

- Promotional poster
- Hanyu Pinyin: 黑拳
- Directed by: Dennis Law
- Written by: Dennis Law
- Produced by: Dennis Law; Herman Yau
- Starring: Wu Jing; Ronald Cheng; Miki Yeung; Theresa Fu; Ken Lo; Timmy Hung
- Cinematography: Herman Yau
- Edited by: Yau Chi-wai
- Music by: Tommy Wai
- Production companies: Point of View Movie Production Co. Ltd. One Hundred Years of Film; Gold Label Pictures (Hong Kong)
- Distributed by: China Star Entertainment Group
- Release date: 5 October 2006
- Running time: 110 minutes
- Country: Hong Kong
- Language: Cantonese

Fatal Contact (Chinese: 黑拳) is a 2006 Hong Kong martial arts film written and directed by Dennis Law, and produced by Law and Herman Yau. The film stars Wu Jing, Ronald Cheng, Miki Yeung, Theresa Fu, Cheung Siu-fai, Ken Lo, Andy On, Lam Suet and Timmy Hung. Wu Jing played Kong Ko who is trained with the fighting techniques of Sanshou martial arts, and lured into the world of illegal martial arts fighting.

== Plot ==
A young Chinese martial arts national champion, Kong, comes to Hong Kong on a short contract with a Chinese opera group. A small-time gambling boss, Ma, is so impressed with Kong that he wants him to be his fighter in the underground all-contact boxing world. In need of money, Kong makes up his mind to enter the underground boxing scene with his girlfriend Tin, and together they are under control. Kong's fighting skills made him unbeatable in the arena, but after each win, he gets himself too deep into the underground world.

== Cast ==
- Wu Jing as Kong Ko
- Ronald Cheng as 'Captain' Chan Shing
- Miki Yeung as Siu Tin
- Theresa Fu as Chui Chi
- Cheung Siu-fai as Ma Ho-keung
- Ken Lo as Chan Sun
- Andy On as Silver Dragon
- Lam Suet as Soo
- Timmy Hung as Portland Street Fighter
- Johnny Lu as Wai
- Chan Man-ching as fighter
- Lee Chi Kit as Ricky's gangster
- Kenji Tanigaki as fighter
- Anthony Carpio as fighter

== Production ==
Fatal Contact is Dennis Law's third film as a writer and director. He reunites with the same crew he used to work on his last two films The Unusual Youth and Love @ First Note. The film was produced by Law's production company, Point of View Movie Production Co. Ltd., Charles Heung's China Star Entertainment and Paco Wong's Gold Label Entertainment, the management company of Wu Jing, Ronald Cheng and Miki Yeung. Fight choreography was coordinated by Nicky Li, a member of the Jackie Chan Stunt Team.

=== Filming ===
Filming for Fatal Contact began in Hong Kong on 11 April 2006 under the tentative titles Black Fist and Underground Fist (黑拳). Filming had finally ended with a production inauguration on 24 May 2006.

=== Fight choreography ===
The fight sequences were choreographed by Nicky Li, a member of the Jackie Chan Stunt Team. Li had served as choreographer and stunt coordinator for Dennis Law's previous two films The Unusual Youth and Love @ First Note. In Beijing, China, Wu Jing prepared for his role by training in Sanshou martial arts. Wu admitted to receiving injuries on set, and described the film as his toughest work to date. His manager, Paco Wong, arranged for him to stay in a special hostel, as he would be staying in Hong Kong during the two-month shoot.

During filming, Wu had to deal with different opponents each day, and had to use various techniques against them. He also worked very closely with Li, discussing and exploring various moves with him They would try out different moves before demonstrating to the rest of the cast. The major fight scene between Wu and Xing Yu required two rehearsals before proceeding to actual filming, which was done in two takes.

The production crew also took extra precaution when filming action scenes involving Ronald Cheng as Cheng had not recovered from a previous waist injury. Prior to filming, Cheng had sought guidance from Wu, and discovered several fatal moves in the art of combat, one of which resulted in a thumb injury caused by Wu.

== Release ==
=== DVD release ===
American film distributor The Weinstein Company picked up distribution rights for the film and released the film on DVD as part of their Dragon Dynasty collection. The 2-Disc Special Edition DVD was released on 22 January 2008. Features on the DVD include interviews with Wu Jing, Theresa Fu and Miki Yeung and a feature commentary with Dennis Law and Hong Kong Cinema expert Bey Logan. DVD was released in Region 2 in the United Kingdom on 21 July 2008, it was distributed by Cine Asia.
