= The Constable =

2013 Hong Kong film by Dennis Law

- Film poster
- Traditional Chinese: 衝鋒戰警
- Simplified Chinese: 冲锋战警
- Hanyu Pinyin: Chōng Fēng Zhàn Jǐng
- Jyutping: Cung1 Fung1 Zin3 Ging2
- Directed by: Dennis Law
- Written by: Dennis Law
- Produced by: Dennis Law
- Starring: Simon Yam; Lam Suet; Sam Lee; Maggie Shiu; Niu Mengmeng; Wang Ziyi; Maggie Li; Ken Lo
- Cinematography: Ko Chiu Lam
- Edited by: Yau Chi Wai
- Music by: Tommy Wai
- Production company: Point of View Movie Production
- Distributed by: Newport Entertainment
- Release date: 28 November 2013
- Running time: 84 minutes
- Country: Hong Kong
- Language: Cantonese

The Constable is a 2013 Hong Kong action drama film written, produced and directed by Dennis Law and starring Simon Yam.

== Plot ==
Lam Kwok-kuen is a police officer who served for many years in the police force and has many admirable achievements. He now taking care of his intellectually disabled son, Chung.

Lam hires a girl named Lin Tsui-yan to watch Chung when he goes to work. This made Tsui-yan's boyfriend, Chow Gong-hong feel uncomfortable. But after a while, Chung suffered a heart attack and died in his sleep. After Chung's death, Tsui-yan still spent a lot of time at Lam's house. Gong-hong begins to get angry and suspects that Tsui-yan having an affair with Lam. Tsui-yan wants to break up with Gong-hong and return to her hometown.

Gong-hong owed money to a gangster named Dah Kin, and Dah Kin asked Gong-hong to go with him if Gong-hong wants to have money to repay. Dah Kin and his gang have a plot to rob the bank. After his son's death, Lam asked to be transfer from the transport team to the criminal team.

During the patrol, Lam saw Gong-hong and Dah Kin's gang, who were about to rob the bank. When Lam demand the gang get out of their car, the gang fire their guns at Lam. Lam called for more police to support him. After a car chase on the street, the gang enter an abandoned warehouse. Lam chased after Gong-hong, while the other police officers surrounded the gang. After a gunfight, the police force arrested Dah Kin and his gang. Gong-hong falls from the high to the ground and is severely injured. He was also arrested by the police.

Lam returned to his police station and received a letter from Tsui-yan. Tsui-yan revealed now she is in her hometown and teaching dance to the children.

== Cast ==
- Simon Yam as Lam Kwok-kuen, a police officer whose sole requirement on the job is oversee the department fleet. Despite this, he remains active in the front line of police service, putting his life on the line for sake of others, his heroism bettering even the most seasoned professionals.
- Lam Suet as Lok Wah-wai, nicknamed Fat Wai, good friend and colleague of Lam for years. Despite his weight, he is the renowned marksman of the police force.
- Niu Mengmeng as Lin Tsui-yan, who is employed by Lam to look after his mentally challenged son, Chung. Yan lovingly cared for Chung, but this led to the misunderstanding of his boyfriend, Chow, that she has been two timing with Lam. Yan later left Chow for her hometown after Chung died.
- Sam Lee as Chow Gong-hong, a small-time crook living with his uncle in Shenzhen who mistakenly accused his girlfriend, Tsui-yan, for having an affair with Lam. He is later arrested in Hong Kong due his involvement in an armed bank robbery.
- Maggie Shiu as Station Sergeant Hui Chun, an outstanding police officer and good friend of Lam.
- Wang Ziyi as Lui Kiu-mei, nicknamed Sissy, Lam's subordinate in the Force fleet department. A secret admirer of WPC Fa-fa, the self abased Lui never dared to express his feelings for her. However, inspired and encouraged by Lam, Lui vowed to work hard to improve himself to win Fa's love and pursue his dream to be a Flying Tiger.
- Maggie Li as Fa-fa, a WPC under Hui and the object of Lui's affection. She was unimpressed initially by Lui until she witnessed his daring feat during a police gun fight.
- Ken Lo as Dah Kin
- Li Jinjiang as Lam Wing-chung, nicknamed Little Chung, Lam's son. He has Down syndrome and heart disease. He is well cared and loved by his father despite Chung's health condition. Since birth, Chung has lived a happy life.
- Mia Chen as Drunken Girl
- Wang Siya as Ginny
- Lisa Cheng as Lady Gangster
- Lo Hoi-pang as Uncle On (guest star)
- Cheung Siu-fai as Wong Ha (guest star)
