= Fatal Contact =

Fatal Contact may refer to one of the following:

- Fatal Contact: Bird Flu in America, a 2006 ABC television film
- Fatal Contact (film), a 2006 Hong Kong film starring Wu Jing
