= The Shopaholics =

2006 Hong Kong film by Wai Ka-fai

- Film poster
- Directed by: Wai Ka-Fai
- Written by: Wai Ka-Fai; Au Kin-Yee
- Produced by: Wai Ka-Fai; Yang Ying
- Starring: Cecilia Cheung; Lau Ching-Wan; Jordan Chan
- Cinematography: Wong Wing-Hang
- Edited by: Marco Mak
- Music by: Tommy Wai
- Distributed by: China Star Entertainment Group (Hong Kong); China Film Group (China)
- Release date: 20 January 2006 (Hong Kong)
- Country: Hong Kong
- Language: Cantonese

The Shopaholics (Chinese: 最爱女人购物狂) is a 2006 Hong Kong romantic comedy film directed by Wai Ka-Fai, and starring Cecilia Cheung, Lau Ching-Wan, Jordan Chan, Ella Koon, and Paula Tsui.

== Cast ==
- Cecilia Cheung
- Lau Ching-Wan
- Jordan Chan
- Ella Koon
- Paula Tsui
- Dennis Law
- Law Kar-ying
- Johnny Lu
- Isabel Chan
