= SPL: Sha Po Lang =

2005 Hong Kong film by Wilson Yip

- SPL: Sha Po Lang DVD cover

Chinese name
- Traditional Chinese: 殺破狼
- Simplified Chinese: 杀破狼
Transcriptions
Standard Mandarin
- Hanyu Pinyin: Shā Pò Láng
Yue: Cantonese
- Jyutping: Saat3 Po3 Long4
- Directed by: Wilson Yip
- Written by: Wilson Yip; Szeto Kam-Yuen; Jack Ng
- Produced by: Carl Chang
- Starring: Donnie Yen; Sammo Hung; Simon Yam; Wu Jing
- Cinematography: Lam Wah-chuen
- Edited by: Cheung Ka-fai
- Music by: Ken Chan; Chan Kwong-wing
- Production companies: ABBA Movies Co. Ltd.; 1618 Action Limited
- Distributed by: ABBA Movies Co. Ltd.
- Release date: 18 November 2005
- Running time: 93 minutes
- Countries: Hong Kong; China
- Languages: Cantonese; Mandarin

SPL: Sha Po Lang (Chinese: 殺破狼, released in the United States as Kill Zone) is a 2005 Hong Kong action film directed by Wilson Yip and written by Yip, Szeto Kam-Yuen and Jack Ng. It stars Donnie Yen, Sammo Hung, Simon Yam, and Wu Jing. The film was released theatrically in Hong Kong on 18 November 2005.

Yam portrays a police detective who, suffering from cancer and about to retire, resorts to illegal means in order to catch a ruthless triad boss. The title Sha Po Lang refers to three words derived from Chinese astrology that each represent a different star capable of good or evil depending on their position in the heavens.

== Plot ==
The prologue of the movie is set in 1994, prior to the return of Hong Kong to the People's Republic of China. Chan Kwok-chung (Simon Yam), a Hong Kong police inspector, has dedicated his career to putting Wong Po (Sammo Hung), a notorious triad boss, behind bars. While escorting a witness with damning evidence of Wong's wrongdoings to court, Chan's car is rammed by another car driven by Jack (Wu Jing), a ruthless assassin. Jack then executes the witness, ensuring Wong Po would walk free. Chan survives with a piece of glass stuck in his head. After the glass is removed, the doctor informs Chan of a tumor in his brain that will soon kill him. Chan becomes even more determined to bring down Wong Po, using any means necessary.

Three years later, Ma Kwun (Donnie Yen), a police officer from another precinct, is assigned to replace Chan, who is going to retire soon. Ma will lead Chan's team, composed of Wah, Sum and Lok. The three men are very protective of Chan, who has since adopted the slain witness' daughter, as her mother was killed in the earlier car crash.

An electronics shop owner brings to the police station a video tape of Wong Po torturing an undercover agent. In the video, Wong hits the agent repeatedly with a golf club, then one of his men finishes him off. Chan and his colleagues decide to alter the tape, intimidate the shop owner into accusing Wong Po of being the murderer, and eliminate the real killer. Ma, who once beat up a drug trafficker so badly that the latter became mentally handicapped, has vowed to abstain from using questionable means in his career. Ma notices that Chan's team is acting suspiciously, but he still helps in the arrest of Wong Po. Ma then catches Chan's team's in the act of murdering the henchman that actually killed the undercover agent. Ma briefly fights the four of them.

The group receives a message warning them against leaving the police station that night. Ignoring the threat, Lok goes to buy a gun to serve as Wong Po's "murder weapon", but is trapped in an enclosed area and ends up getting killed by a knife-wielding Jack. Meanwhile, a copy of the original video tape is given to Chan's superior, Cheung Chun-fei. Seeing that Chan had tampered with evidence to frame Wong Po, Cheung releases Wong and tries to arrest Chan. An elderly policeman called Uncle Ba (who had received help from Chan earlier in the film) helps Chan avoid arrest. Later that night, Jack sneaks up on Wah and Sum and stabs them to death. Ma rushes to save them but arrives too late. Before dying, Wah confesses to Ma that he, Sum and Lok had stolen money from Wong Po (when they busted one of Wong's drug operations earlier) to help Chan raise his adopted daughter, and were targeted for retaliation by Wong.

At the station, Ma has a heated argument with Cheung over the handling of the case. Furious, he turns in his badge and gun. Chan goes to Wong Po's office, pretending to bring the stolen money. He guns down several henchmen but is stabbed and overpowered by Jack, then tortured by Wong Po, who calls Ma and tells him that he has taken Chan captive.

Ma heads to Wong Po's office. Jack confronts and battles Ma in an alley. Jack wrestles Ma's baton away from him, but Ma eviscerates Jack with his own knife. In Wong's office, where Chan is tied up, Ma returns the money and fights Wong. The crime lord is seemingly defeated when he is slammed onto a glass display of bottles. Ma pours himself a drink, but Wong suddenly gets up and pushes Ma out of a window. Ma lands on the car carrying Wong's wife and baby son, caving in the roof. All three are killed instantly. Wong gazes down at Ma's body and recognizes the car underneath. Wong starts sobbing, broken with grief.

In the final scene, Chan and his adopted daughter are seen on the beach, with the girl playing near the shore. Chan finally succumbs to his tumour and dies.

== Cast ==
- Donnie Yen as Inspector Ma Kwun
- Sammo Hung as Wong Po
- Simon Yam as Inspector Chan Kwok-chung
- Wu Jing as Jack
- Liu Kai-chi as Inspector Lo Kwun-wah
- Danny Summer as Inspector Kwok Tze-sum
- Ken Chang as Inspector Lee Wai-lok
- Austin Wai as Cheung Chun-fei
- Timmy Hung as Drug Trafficker
- Chan Tat-chee as Uncle Ba
- Liang Jingke as Wong Po's wife
- Vincent Sze as Chan Wai
- Kenji Tanigaki as Wong Po's bodyguard
- Lau Ching-lam as Hoi-yee
- Poon Mei-kei as Kwok Tze-sum's daughter
- Yuen Kin-leung as Lagoon Monster
- Chris Tsui Wai as Wong Po's bodyguard
- So Tung as Wong Po's bodyguard
- Au Hin-wai as Wong Po's lawyer
- Jeff Kam as Bottle-throwing Gangster

== Box office ==
SPL: Sha Po Lang opened in Hong Kong on 18 November 2005. In its first three days it grossed HK$2,166,088. It stayed in the number one position at the Hong Kong box office until 6 December, and eventually grossed HK$7,425,473 in its entire run.

== Awards and nominations ==
Awards and nominations
Ceremony	Category	Recipient	Outcome
25th Hong Kong Film Awards	Best Action Choreography	Donnie Yen	Won
25th Hong Kong Film Awards	Best Supporting Actor	Liu Kai-chi	Nominated

== Home media ==
DVD was released in Region 1 in the United States on 12 September 2006, it was distributed by Dragon Dynasty.

On 8 March 2010, DVD was released by Cine Asia presents Dragon Dynasty in a two disc ultimate edition at the United Kingdom in Region 2.

== Reception ==
On Rotten Tomatoes the film has an aggregate review score of 80% based on 5 critic reviews.

== Sequels ==
=== SPL II: A Time For Consequences ===
Dennis Law had written a script for a sequel to SPL that he later reworked and produced as his 2008 film Fatal Move. On 13 September 2013, Twitch Film reported that a sequel titled SPL II: A Time For Consequences was in the works. It to be directed by Cheang Pou-soi and to star Sammo Hung and Wu Jing, reprising their roles as Wong Po and Jack, respectively. The film was also to star Francis Ng, Tony Jaa. Donnie Yen was not to be reprising his role as Inspector Ma Kwun. In April 2014 it was announced that SPL II would be directed by Cheang Pou-soi and would star Tony Jaa in the lead role with Simon Yam and Wu Jing, who were to return as different characters from the original film if it were a sequel. The film was released on 18 June 2015. Sammo Hung did not reprise his role as Wong Po and instead directed and starred in the 2016 film The Bodyguard.

=== Paradox ===
Wilson Yip returned to direct the third film in the SPL series, Paradox, which had its premiere at the Hong Kong International Film Festival (HKIFF) on 15 August 2017, followed by a release in China on 17 August 2017 and in Hong Kong on 25 August 2017.

== See also ==
- Donnie Yen filmography
- List of Hong Kong films
- Sammo Hung filmography
