= Love @ First Note =

2006 Hong Kong film by Dennis Law

- Film poster
- Traditional Chinese: 戀愛初歌
- Simplified Chinese: 恋爱初歌
- Directed by: Dennis Law
- Written by: Dennis Law
- Produced by: Dennis Law; Herman Yau; Paco Wong
- Starring: Justin Lo; Kary Ng; Alex Fong Lik-Sun; Stephy Tang; Theresa Fu
- Cinematography: Herman Yau
- Edited by: Yau Chi-Wai
- Music by: Mark Lui
- Production companies: Point of View Movie Production Co. Ltd. One Hundred Years of Film Co. Ltd. Gold Label Pictures
- Distributed by: China Star Entertainment Group
- Release date: 17 August 2006 (Hong Kong)
- Running time: 100 minutes
- Country: Hong Kong
- Language: Cantonese

Love @ First Note is a 2006 Hong Kong teen romance film, written, produced and directed by Dennis Law, and starring Alex Fong, Justin Lo, and Kary Ng. Its title in the original Chinese release was 戀愛初歌.

== Cast ==
- Kary Ng as Kristi
- Justin Lo as Kei
- Alex Fong as Tony
- Stephy Tang as Amy
- Theresa Fu as Philo
- Miki Yeung
- Tats Lau
- Lam Suet
- George Lam
- Leo Ku

== Plot ==
Kristi (Kary Ng) is a girl who works at a used record store. She has a very good friend, Kei (Justin Lo). They have been friends since they were very young. One day, a young man, Tony (Alex Fong) comes into the store and Kristi develops a crush on him. She seeks help and advice from Kei.

Kei is a songwriter. He helps the lead singer of Silver Misquitoes write songs. One day, Kristi goes with Kei to the bar to deliver a song, and the lead singer Jack Ming starts to woo her. Kristi acted rudely in return, causing Jack to seek revenge for the embarrassment. Tony wishes to be a member of Silver Misquitoes so Jack uses Tony against Kristi. Tony asks Kristi on a date to a part with his "band". Jack pays two girls, Philo (Theresa Fu) and Amy (Stephy Tang), to lead Kristi into an evil plan, embarrassing her. Later, everyone, except Jack, who was involved with this plan realized their wrong and apologized to Kristi. Kristi, Tony, Kei, and Kristi's boss Lobo (Tats Lau) form their own band to beat Jack in a talent competition. During the competition, they realized Jack stole their song. Kei then takes out a song "Kong" (an original from Justin Lo's album No Protection) which he wrote for Kristi, his love. They win the competition and Kristi realizes she loves Kei, too.
