= Lai Lok-yi =

Hong Kong actor

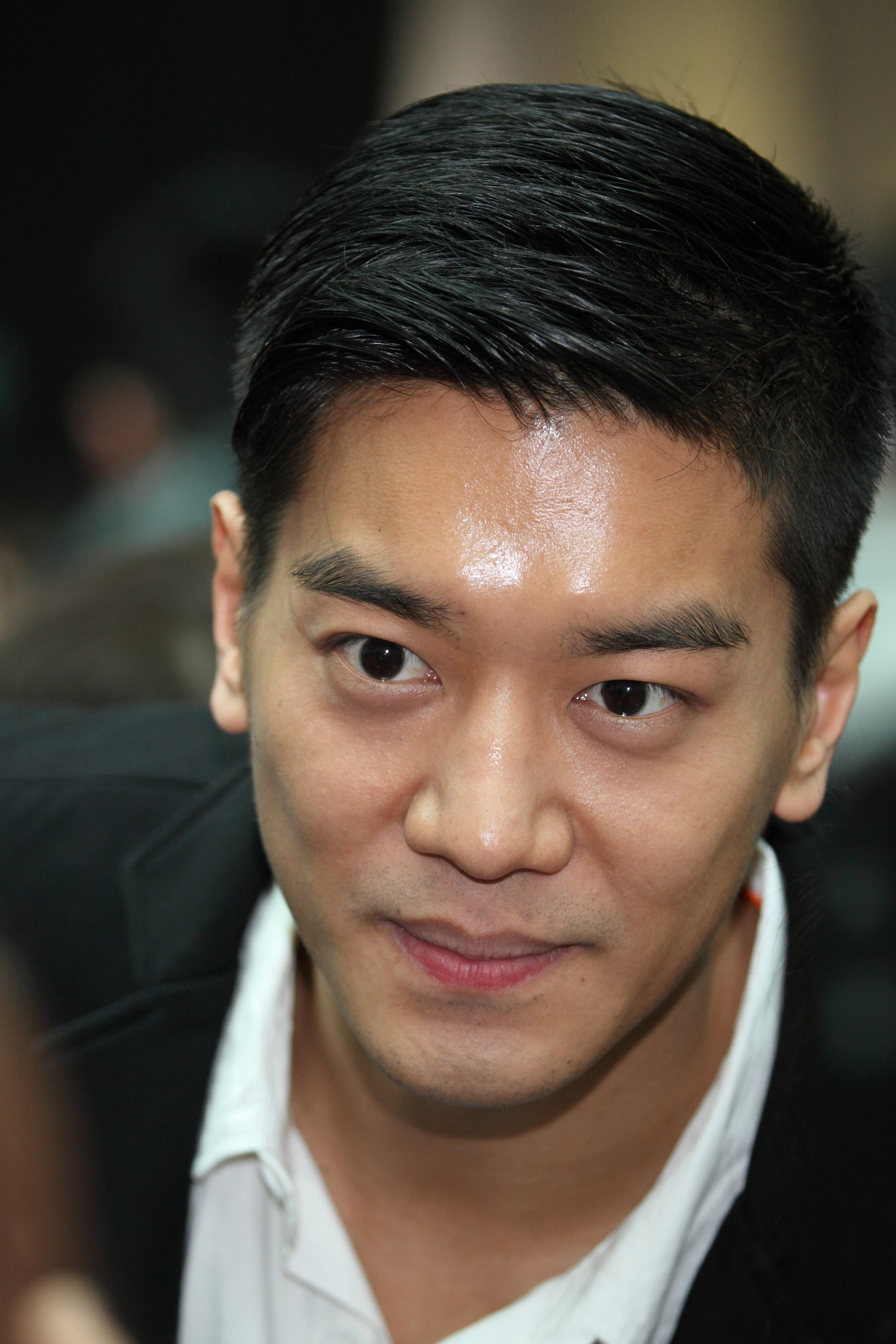
- Lai in 2014
- Born: Lai Yat-sing 黎日昇 (Traditional) 黎日升 (Simplified); Lai4 Jat6 Sing1 (Cantonese); Lí Rìshēng / Li^{2} Jih^{4}-sheng^{1} (Mandarin); June 15, 1980 (age 46); British Hong Kong
- Occupations: Actor; host
- Years active: 2003–present
- Notable work: Come Home Love; Who Wants a Baby?
- Height: 1.82 m (6 ft 0 in)
- Spouse: Nicole Lee (m. 2014)
- Children: 2 sons

Chinese name
- Traditional Chinese: 黎諾懿
- Simplified Chinese: 黎诺懿
Transcriptions
Standard Mandarin
- Hanyu Pinyin: Lí Nùoyì
Yue: Cantonese
- Jyutping: Lai4 Nok6 Ji3

Chris Lai Lok-yi (born 15 June 1980) is a Hong Kong actor, host and producer contracted to TVB.

Lai is best known for playing John Ma in the TVB sitcom Come Home Love from 2012 to 2015. In 2018, he was nominated for TVB Anniversary Award for Best Actor for his performance as Elvis Yip in the family drama Who Wants a Baby?.

== Background ==
Lai Lok-yi was born on 15 June 1980 in Hong Kong in a very poor family with 5 members including himself, his parents, an elder brother and a younger brother; he is the middle child. He grew up living in a small flat in Hong Kong. Lai’s father worked very hard to buy a truck for delivery, which helped improve the life of his family. However, at 11 years old, his father died from cancer. After his death, his and his family's lives worsened. His mother worked 2 jobs, an office cleaner and a street vendor, while raising her children. In high school, he started working various part-time jobs in hopes to support his family. He even worked as a docker in 2 big supermarkets in Hong Kong and taught children to earn money.

After graduating from Tung Wah Group of Hospitals Yau Tze Tin Memorial College, Lai worked in a bank. After much pressure, he resigned. Lai signed up for TVB's Artiste Training School in 2001. After 3 unsuccessful interviews, he was eventually chosen due a close resemblance of the late music star Danny Chan.

== Career ==
Acting career of Lai is a long way from his early rise to success and long plateau. After making cameo appearances in several dramas, Lai took on his first major supporting role in the sports drama Aqua Heroes while he was still a trainee. He graduated from the school in 2002. In 2003, he starred in the idol drama Hearts of Fencing, leading a cast consisting entirely of rookies. Back then, when he debuted, he was grouped with fellow actors Raymond Lam, Ron Ng, Bosco Wong, Sammul Chan and Kenneth Ma to make up the “Olympic Six”. While the other five in the group have already reached male lead status, Lai was still hovering in second and third line roles. People said that TVB did not intend to make his name although Lai Lok-yi had all the fundamentals to become a successful actor with his tall stature and handsome good looks.

Until 2012, sitcom drama Come Home Love gained a big success, and Lai played the main role as John Ma, which rose him to popularity. In the next few years, Lai also starred in several popular TVB dramas such as: My Unfair Lady, Daddy Cool, Presumed Accidents and The Tofu War . In 2018, Lai starred in the family drama Who Wants a Baby? as the first male lead. The drama earned critical acclaim and garnered him nominations for Best Actor and Most Popular Male Character at the 2018 TVB Anniversary Awards.

== The origin of the stage name "Lai Lok Yi" ==
His real name is Lai Yat-sing, which was named by his late father. The stage name "Lai Lok Yi" was named by his teacher. He chose his name while filling the form of attending the training artiste class. He believed that this name would bring him the durability in the career.

== Personal life ==
Lai dated actress Tavia Yeung from 2008 to 2011. From 2011 to 2014, Lai dated Nicole Lee, a former Miss Hong Kong contestant and heiress to a Hong Kong–based beauty corporation. They got married in November 2014. Their son was born in 2017. Their second son was born in early 2022.

== Filmography ==
Title	Year	Role	Notes
City of Dream	2007		
Bad Blood	2010	Jason Lok	
Womb Ghosts	2010	Joseph	
I Love Hong Kong	2011	FEHD staff	Cameo
I Love Hong Kong 2013	2013		

=== Television dramas ===
Title	Year	Role	Notes
The King of Yesterday and Tomorrow	2003	Private Investigator	
Better Halves	2003	Constable	
Virtues of Harmony II	2003	Jackie	
The 'W' Files	2003	Japanese soldier (extra)	
Survivor's Law	2003	(extra)	
Aqua Heroes	2003	Chi Cho-yam	
Hearts of Fencing	2003	Au-yeung Yat	TVB Anniversary Award for My Favourite On-screen Partners – Non-dramas
Triumph in the Skies	2003	office worker (extra) / trainee	Episode 24 / Episode 40 (end)
Dream of Colours	2004	Koo Lok-man	
Hard Fate	2004	shopper (extra)	
To Catch the Uncatchable	2004	Lai Lap-chi	
Split Second	2004	Dick Au Kin-fung	
ICAC Investigators 2004	2004	Inspector Arthur Kwok Chi-hei	
Always Ready	2005	Kelvin Chiang Ka-lok	
Safe Guards	2006	Sheung Yee	
Welcome to the House	2006	Ma Tak-on	
Land of Wealth	2006	Cho King-yin	
Forensic Heroes	2006	Chan Man-tik	Episodes 1–2
Glittering Days	2006	James Hui Wing-hong	Nominated — TVB Anniversary Award for Most Improved Male Artiste (Top 5)
Ten Brothers	2007	Thousand Mile Eye	Nominated — TVB Anniversary Award for Most Improved Male Artiste (Top 5)
Heart of Greed	2007	Tong Chi-foon	Nominated — TVB Anniversary Award for Best Supporting Actor (Top 20); Nominated — TVB Anniversary Award for Most Improved Male Artiste (Top 5)
The Green Grass of Home	2007	Choi Ka-po	Nominated — TVB Anniversary Award for Most Improved Male Artiste (Top 5)
Fathers and Sons	2007	Ben Lui Ka-sing	
The Building Blocks of Life	2007	Choi Chi-yin	
Forensic Heroes II	2008	Lee Chi-wai	Episodes 20–22
Speech of Silence	2008	Cheung Yau	
Moonlight Resonance	2008	Kam Wing-yuen	
The Beauty of the Game	2009-10	Deacon Chong Tik-kan	
In the Eye of the Beholder	2010	Ching-tak Emperor	
Every Move You Make	2010	Mak Wing-hei	
Twilight Investigation	2010	Yau Sum-kit	
Only You	2011	"King" Cheung King-yuen	Nominated — My AOD Favourites Award for My Favourite Promising Actor
The Other Truth	2011	Danny Mo King-yip	
The Life and Times of a Sentinel	2011	Kei Man-cheong (youth)	Episode 1
Forensic Heroes III	2011	Vic Mak Wing-fu	Episodes 1–3
Daddy Good Deeds	2012	Chan Lap-shun	
King Maker	2012	Chiu Kwai-wo	
Come Home Love	2012-15	John Ma Chong	Main Role
Ruse of Engagement	2014	Fu Wang-leung	
ICAC Investigators 2016	2016	Bao Siu-chung	
Presumed Accidents	2016	Mantus Cheuk Sing-yeung	
My Unfair Lady	2017	Hanson Ho Chi-chiu	
The Tofu War	2017	Samuel Wong Siu-ming	Main Role Nominated -TVB Anniversary Award for Most Popular Male Character
Another Era	2017	Chu Kong	
Daddy Cool	2018	Gordon Tong Chak-ching	
Who Wants A Baby	2018	Elvis Yip Chi-ting	Main Role Nominated -TVB Anniversary Award for Best Actor Nominated -TVB Anniversary Award for Most Popular Male Character
My Life As Loan Shark	2019	IP Ben Ching Yu-sum	Main Role Nominated -TVB Anniversary Award for Best Actor
Go! Go! Go! Operation C9	2020	B3	Main Role Nominated -TVB Anniversary Award for Best Actor
Murder Diary	2021	CIP Kong Ching-fun	Major Supporting Role Nominated -TVB Anniversary Award for Best Supporting Actor
Happily Ever After?	2024	Kam Shing-kwan	Main Role

=== Music video appearances ===
- 2003: "Fong Sang" (放生) by Jade Kwan
- 2003: "Tung Yau Ji Chui" (痛由自取) by Yumiko Cheng
- 2005: "San Sai Kai" (新世界) by 2R
- 2005: "Rolls-Royce" by Denise Ho
- 2005: "Tei Ping Sin" (地平線) by Ella Koon
- 2006: "Sam Sang Yau Hang" (三生有幸) by Ronald Cheng
- 2006: "December Rain" by Rain Li
- 2008: "Jui Mei Lai Tik Tai Chat Tin" (最美麗的第七天) by Vincy Chan
- 2008: "Sui Sin Mo Cheung Ngor Jeh Yeung Keung Tik Yan" (誰羨慕像我這樣強的人) by Theresa Fu
- 2008: "Yee Yan Sai Kai" (二人世界) Linda Chung
- 2009: "I'm Sorry" by Charlene Choi
