= Election (2005 film) =

2005 Hong Kong film by Johnnie To

- Original film poster

Chinese name
- Traditional Chinese: 黑社會
- Simplified Chinese: 黑社会
- Literal meaning: Black Society
Transcriptions
Standard Mandarin
- Hanyu Pinyin: Hēi Shè Huì
Yue: Cantonese
- Jyutping: Hak1 Se5 Wui2
- Directed by: Johnnie To
- Written by: Yau Nai-hoi; Yip Tin-shing
- Produced by: Dennis Law; Johnnie To
- Starring: Simon Yam; Tony Leung Ka-fai; Louis Koo; Nick Cheung
- Cinematography: Cheng Siu-Keung
- Edited by: Patrick Tam
- Music by: Lo Ta-yu
- Production companies: Milkyway Image; One Hundred Years of Film
- Distributed by: China Star Entertainment Group
- Release date: 20 October 2005
- Running time: 101 minutes
- Country: Hong Kong
- Languages: Cantonese; Mandarin
- Box office: US$2.2 million

Election (Chinese: 黑社會; lit. 'Black Society'; the common Cantonese name for the triads), is a 2005 Hong Kong crime film directed and produced by Johnnie To. Featuring a large ensemble cast, the film stars Simon Yam and Tony Leung Ka-fai as two gang leaders engaged in a power struggle to become the new leader of a Hong Kong triad.

The film premiered as an "Official Selection" at the 2005 Cannes Film Festival, before being released in Hong Kong on 20 October 2005, with a Category III rating. It received widespread critical praise and was a commercial success. At the 25th Hong Kong Film Awards, the film won in four categories including Best Film and Best Director.

A sequel, Election 2, was released in 2006 to commercial and critical success. To has spoken repeatedly of his intention to make a third Election film, however he has referred to media censorship and the National Security Law as obstacles to the production of the film.

== Plot ==
In Hong Kong, the Hongmen-descendant and 50,000-strong triad Wo Lin Shing elects a new chairman every two years. The two leading contenders of the current election are Lok and Big D. Lok is calm, patient and even-tempered, while Big D, who attempts to buy the election with bribes, is boisterous, impatient and quick-tempered. After some quarrelling among both candidates' supporters, the triad's elders elect Lok as the new chairman. Big D refuses to honour the result, and instead attempts to obtain the triad's dragonhead baton, the traditional symbol of the chairman's authority, from Whistle, the previous chairman. Whistle orders his driver Four-Eyes to hide the baton in Mainland China. Lok also has his supporters search for the baton.

The police step in to prevent infighting and maintain the peace by arresting the triad's key figures, including Whistle, Big D, and Lok, who is handcuffed and taken away in front of his young son. However, due to a lack of incriminating evidence, the triad members can only be temporarily detained. During the arrest, Big D attacks Whistle, causing Whistle to be hit by a car. A severely injured Whistle indicates intent to testify to the police's anti-triad unit to expose Big D; this extends Big D's detention. Not wanting the triad's crimes to be exposed, Lok has his lawyer convince Whistle to kill himself to ensure Whistle's family's safety. While in custody, the police allow the triad elders to try to broker peace, but Big D threatens to break away from Wo Lin Shing and form a new triad, which would upset triad tradition and bring about much violence; this causes most of the triad to unite against Big D.

Triad members Kun and Big Head, whose bosses previously supported Big D and Lok respectively, are sent to Guangzhou to search for the baton. Mr. So accompanies Big Head and they find Four-Eyes and retrieve the baton. However, mainland police ambush the group, and Mr. So surrenders himself in order for Big Head to get away. Big Head is ambushed and savagely beaten by Kun, but refuses to give up the baton. During his beating, both Big Head and Kun receive calls from their bosses, who have decided to unite against Big D. Big Head gives Kun the baton, who crosses the border and passes it to Jet, a triad assassin. He is pursued by Jimmy, whose triad member uncle and boss were both severely injured by Big D for supposedly costing him the election.

Jet is attacked by Big D's supporters and is severely injured. Jimmy saves him but takes the baton. Despite some initial reluctance, he ultimately gives it to Lok after Lok states that he can improve the triad's earnings. Lok rewards those who assisted him in obtaining the baton (Big Head, Jet, Jimmy, Kun, and Mr. So) with privileges of becoming his godsons. Big D is released on bail after it is paid by Lok. Using the baton, Lok secures his position as the triad's new chairman and offers a deal to Big D. If Big D accepts Lok as chairman, they will take over the lucrative Tsim Sha Tsui area together, Lok will protect Big D's businesses and support Big D for chairmanship at the next election in two years; Big D accepts. The high-ranking triad members, including Lok and Big D, pledge loyalty to each other and the triad during Lok's swearing-in ceremony.

When a rival triad boss, Dinosaur, offers Big D the chance to improve his earnings on the condition that Big D betray Lok, Big D reacts by calling Lok in for an apparent ambush. This is a double cross; Lok and Big D trap and murder Dinosaur. Eventually, Lok and Big D successfully take over Tsim Sha Tsui. During a fishing trip, Big D expresses interest in becoming a co-chairman of the triad along with Lok, pointing out that other triads have such arrangements. Lok responds that this is not their triad's tradition, but Big D does not change his mind. Lok feigns supporting Big D's idea, then murders Big D with a rock; this is witnessed by Lok's son and Big D's wife. She tries to flee, but Lok strangles her to death. Lok buries Big D and his wife and leaves the scene with his shaken son.

== Cast ==
- Simon Yam as Lok, candidate for the election and leader of the Jordan triad
- Tony Leung Ka-fai as Big D, candidate for the election and leader of the Tsuen Wan triad
- Louis Koo as Jimmy, a subordinate of Sonny and Long Gun
- Nick Cheung as Jet, a triad assassin and subordinate of Fish-Head
- Gordon Lam as Kun, a subordinate of Blackie
- Cheung Siu-fai as Mr. So, a stuttering triad lawyer, subordinate of Sparky
- Lam Suet as Big Head, a subordinate of Tally
- Wong Tin-lam as Uncle Teng, a triad elder
- Tam Ping-man as Uncle Cocky, a triad elder
- Maggie Shiu as Big D's wife
- David Chiang as Chief Superintendent Hui
- You Yong as People's Police Captain in Guangzhou
- Wong Chung as Whistle, the previous triad chairman and keeper of the Dragon Baton, leader of the Wan Chai triad
- Yuen Bun as Incense Master
- Chan Siu Pang as Uncle Monk, a triad elder
- Berg Ng as Senior Inspector Tod
- Ronald Yan as Senior Inspector Yu
- Raymond Wong as Detective Wong
- Robert Hung as Sonny, Long Gun's direct subordinate and Jimmy's boss
- Yu Yuen Yin as Long Gun, a triad elder
- Paul Ng as Tally, Big Head's boss
- Kwok Fung as Fish-Head, subordinate to Uncle Cocky and Jet's boss
- Wong Chi Wai as Blackie, leader of the Tai Po triad who deals in drugs
- Chiu Chi Shing as Long Hair, Big D's bodyguard
- Wong Sze Yan as Lok's bodyguard
- Lam Man Wai as Sparky, leader of the Tai Kok Tsui triad and supporter of Lok
- Ho Hoi Chau as Uncle Double East
- Tong Pui Chung as Uncle Chiu Chow
- Ho Chu as Mon
- Yuen Bo as Dinosaur, leader of the Tsim Sha Tsui triad
- Jonathan Lee as Denny, Lok's son
- Law Wing-cheong as Four-Eyes, Whistle's driver (uncredited)

== Release ==
=== Distribution ===
Election was sold to more than 21 territories, including Optimum Releasing for the United Kingdom, ARP Sélection for France and Hopscotch Films for Australia, after screening at the 2005 Cannes Film Festival in competition. Tartan Films has acquired all United States rights to this movie as of May 2006.

=== Mainland China version ===
According to To, he had no intention of making a version of this film for mainland China. The production company made an altered version anyway, titled Longcheng Suiyue (Chinese: 龙城岁月; pinyin: Lóngchéng Suìyuè; lit. 'Times at Dragon Town'). According to Hilary He, this version has "ten major cuts or changes". An undercover law enforcement agent is added in this version, while the scene revealing that a mafia member was being used by the PRC Central Government as a mole was omitted. One scene erases a mention of the birth tourism in Hong Kong, where mainland Chinese parents give birth in Hong Kong so their children become Hong Kong permanent residents. In this version all of the criminals face arrest and there is a scene where elders give lessons to youth about avoiding the mob.

== Reception ==
=== Box office ===
At the end of its box-office run in Hong Kong, Election grossed about HK$15.59 million, which is considered to be quite high for a film that received a Category III rating (18+ restriction) in Hong Kong.

=== Critical response ===
The A.V. Club's Ignatiy Vishnevetsky writes, "[Johnnie] To's saga makes plain that self-interest, far more than traditional ideas about honor, defines contemporary crooks. While that's hardly an astonishing revelation, the writer-director deftly generates suspense (as well as sly comedy) from a mood of all-consuming untrustworthiness. [...] Thrilling and amusing in equally dark measure, it's an incisive portrait of a dysfunctional family-style organization struggling to update its sordid operation in an age of unchecked capitalist greed."

In 2025, the film was showcased in the section 'Decisive Moments in Asian Cinema' at the 30th Busan International Film Festival, as part of the special "Asian Cinema 100", being the signature work of the director Johnnie To.

=== Awards and nominations ===
Awards
| Year | Award | Category | Name | Outcome | Ref |
|---|---|---|---|---|---|
| 2005 | 35th Festival de Cine de Sitges | Best Director | Johnnie To | Won | |
| 2005 | 42nd Golden Horse Awards | Best Feature Film | Election | Nominated | |
| 2005 | 42nd Golden Horse Awards | Best Director | Johnnie To | Nominated | |
| 2005 | 42nd Golden Horse Awards | Best Original Screenplay | Yau Nai-hoi; Yip Tin-shing | Won | |
| 2005 | 42nd Golden Horse Awards | Best Actor | Tony Leung Ka-fai | Nominated | |
| 2005 | 42nd Golden Horse Awards | Best Supporting Actor | Wong Tin-lam | Nominated | |
| 2005 | 42nd Golden Horse Awards | Best Sound Effects | May Mok; Charlie Lo | Won | |
| 2005 | 42nd Golden Horse Awards | Best Cinematography | Cheng Siu-Keung | Nominated | |
| 2005 | 42nd Golden Horse Awards | Best Original Film Score | Lo Tayu | Nominated | |
| 2005 | 42nd Golden Horse Awards | Best Make-up and Costume Design | Stanley Cheung | Nominated | |
| 2005 | 42nd Golden Horse Awards | Best Action Choreography | Wong Chi-wai | Nominated | |
| 2006 | 2005 Hong Kong Film Directors' Guild Awards | Recommended Film of the Year (Note: Later renamed to Best Film) | Election | Won | |
| 2006 | 2005 Hong Kong Film Directors' Guild Awards | Outstanding Director of the Year (Note: Later renamed to Best Director) | Johnnie To | Won | |
| 2006 | 25th Hong Kong Film Awards | Best Film | Election | Won | |
| 2006 | 25th Hong Kong Film Awards | Best Director | Johnnie To | Won | |
| 2006 | 25th Hong Kong Film Awards | Best Actor | Tony Leung Ka-fai | Won | |
| 2006 | 25th Hong Kong Film Awards | Best Actor | Simon Yam | Nominated | |
| 2006 | 25th Hong Kong Film Awards | Best Screenplay | Yau Nai-hoi; Yip Tin-shing | Won | |
| 2006 | 25th Hong Kong Film Awards | Best Supporting Actor | Wong Tin-lam | Nominated | |
| 2006 | 25th Hong Kong Film Awards | Best Supporting Actress | Maggie Shiu | Nominated | |
| 2006 | 25th Hong Kong Film Awards | Best Cinematography | Cheng Siu-Keung | Nominated | |
| 2006 | 25th Hong Kong Film Awards | Best Film Editing | Patrick Tam | Nominated | |
| 2006 | 25th Hong Kong Film Awards | Best Original Film Score | Lo Tayu | Nominated | |
| 2006 | 12th Hong Kong Film Critics Society Awards | Best Picture | Election | Won | |
| 2006 | 12th Hong Kong Film Critics Society Awards | Best Director | Johnnie To | Won | |

== Sequel ==
Less than a year after Election's premiere, a sequel (also directed by To) was released. Election 2 (also known as Triad Election) likewise proved a commercial and critical success, and was nominated for five Hong Kong Film Awards.

== See also ==
- Johnnie To filmography
- List of Hong Kong films
- List of movies set in Hong Kong
