= The Unusual Youth =

2005 Hong Kong film by Dennis Law

- Promotional poster
- Hanyu Pinyin: 非常青春期
- Directed by: Dennis Law
- Written by: Dennis Law
- Produced by: Dennis Law; Herman Yau
- Starring: Race Wong; Yan Ng; Marco Lok; Raymond Wong
- Cinematography: Herman Yau
- Edited by: Yau Chi-Wai
- Music by: Tommy Wai
- Production companies: One Hundred Years of Film; Point of View Movie Production Co. Ltd.
- Distributed by: China Star Entertainment Group
- Release date: 19 May 2005
- Running time: 99 minutes
- Country: Hong Kong
- Language: Cantonese

The Unusual Youth (Chinese: 非常青春期) is a 2005 Hong Kong teen comedy-drama film centering on five disillusioned Hong Kong teenagers living on the island of Cheung Chau as they try to deal with life in spite of family backgrounds. The film stars Race Wong of 2R fame, Yan Ng, Marco Lok and Raymond Wong. Several veteran Milkyway Image actors, which include Law Wing-Cheong, Cheung Siu-Fai, Lam Suet and Simon Yam (in a brief, unbilled appearance) make cameo appearances.

The Unusual Youth marks the writing and directing debut of Dennis Law, a former real-estate developer turned former chairman for Milkyway Image. It is also the first film to be produced by Law's own production company Point of View Movie Production Co. Ltd.

== Cast ==
- Race Wong as Suki
- Yan Ng as May May
- Marco Lok as Leung Guy-Cheung, a.k.a. Big Chick
- Raymond Wong Ho-Yin as Biggie
- Helena Law as Grandma
- Kitty Yuen as Siu Yiu
- Sammy Leung as Sai Hung
- Lam Suet as Uncle Hong
- Cheung Siu-Fai as Kwok Sir
- Law Wing-Cheong as Inspector Lam
- Johnny Lu as Big Shot
- Simon Yam as Police Superintendent (uncredited)
