= Shermon Tang =

Hong Kong actor (born 1983)

- Born: 27 September 1983 (age 42); Hong Kong
- Occupation: Actress
- Spouse: Andrew Joy (m. 2011)

Chinese name
- Traditional Chinese: 鄧上文
- Simplified Chinese: 邓上文
Transcriptions
Standard Mandarin
- Hanyu Pinyin: Dèng Shàngwén

Shermon Tang Sheung Man (Chinese: 鄧上文; born 27 September 1983) is a Hong Kong television actress of Hakka ancestry. Shermon was awarded the "Miss Photogenic" award at the 2005 Miss Hong Kong Pageant, launching her career in showbiz.

Tang is daughter of TVB actor Tang Ying Mun (English Tang) and married Andrew Joy on 6 March 2011.

== Biography ==
Shermon initially attended King George V School, an international school, before studying in Australia. Shermon's childhood ambition was to become a lawyer or a nurse. But as a child, she took part in Kelly Chen's debut movie "Whatever Will Be, Will Be" (also starring Aaron Kwok). "At the time, there was a big group of kids and we were all happily singing and dancing without a care. Acting gives me a huge sense of satisfaction!" she recalls. In 2006, Shermon found herself on the smaller screen as she played Lawrence Cheng's younger sister Ko Yau Ching in Welcome to the House.

== Filmography ==
=== Television series ===
Year	Title	Role	TVB Anniversary Awards	Notes
2006	Welcome to the House 高朋滿座	Ko Yau Ching 高有情		Main Role
2008	A Journey Called Life 金石良缘	Stephy		Guest Star (episodes 14–20)
2008	Forensic Heroes II 法證先鋒II	Mui Chin 梅芊 (Mabel)		
2009	The Threshold of a Persona; ID精英	Lee Hiu Man 李曉雯		
2009	The Stew of Life 有營煮婦	Frankie		
2009	A Watchdog's Tale 老友狗狗	Wong Ka Man 黃雅文 (Jessie)		
2010	Cupid Stupid 戀愛星求人	Wong Man Kuen 黃美娟		warehoused series
2010	Off Pedder 畢打自己人	Lam Siu-man		cameo
2011	Only You; Only You 只有您	Hui Miu-yan 許妙茵 (Yan)		(episodes 25–27)
2011	My Sister of Eternal Flower 花花世界花家姐	Dora		
2011	Curse of the Royal Harem 萬凰之王	Empress Xiaomucheng		special guest star

=== Television shows ===
Year	Title	Notes
2006	E-Buzz	
2008	Dolce Vita	

=== Film ===
Year	Title	Role
2009	A Very Short Life 短暫的生命	Ivy
2010	Womb Ghosts 惡胎	

== Awards ==
Miss Photogenic 2005
