= Win's Entertainment =

Hong Kong film production company

Win's Entertainment (Hong Kong) Co., Ltd.
- Final logo of the original company, used from 1996 to 2000
- Native name: 永盛娛樂製作 (香港) 有限公司
- Type: Private
- Industry: Cinema of Hong Kong
- Founded: 1977, in Hong Kong (original); 2009 (relaunch)
- Founder: Charles Heung
- Defunct: 1999 (original); 2010 (relaunch)
- Headquarters: Hong Kong, Hong Kong
- Area served: Central; Des Voeux Road; Victoria Harbour
- Key people: Charles Heung; Jimmy Heung
- Products: Films
- Owner: TVB
- Parent: TVB
- Subsidiaries: China Star Entertainment Group

Win's Movie and Television Production (Hong Kong) Co., Ltd. (Chinese: 永盛影視製作 (香港) 有限公司) originally known as Win's Movie Production & I/E Co. Ltd. and Win's Entertainment (Hong Kong) Co. Ltd., was a Hong Kong film production company that was formed by producer Charles Heung and his brother Jimmy Heung. Following its establishment in 1977, Win's Entertainment went on to become one of the powerful film producers in Hong Kong. The company helped to establish the careers of actors Jet Li, Chow Yun-fat, Andy Lau, Stephen Chow and Lau Ching-Wan.

== History ==
Win's Movie Production (Hong Kong) Co. Ltd. (永盛電影製作 (香港) 有限公司) was formed in 1977 by Charles Heung and his younger brother Jimmy Heung. While the triad's influence on the Hong Kong film industry was growing notorious during the 1980s, Charles decided to form his own production company that would provide a safe refuge. He was quoted for saying that "every film is a battle," when asked why he named the company Win's. Following its formation, the company went on to become one of Hong Kong's most successful film studios alongside Golden Harvest. Virtually every actor and actress, apart from Jackie Chan, had made a film for the Heungs.

== Company history ==
Win's Entertainment's filmography spans over 10 years, and some of the films it has produced include the God of Gamblers franchise Tricky Brains, the Lee Rock trilogy and the Fight Back to School trilogy. A majority of its films featured some of Hong Kong's most well-known actors including Jet Li, Chow Yun-fat, Andy Lau, Stephen Chow and Ng Man Tat.

1980s saw the surging demand of home entertainment in Hong Kong, thanks to the introduction of videotapes / laser discs, their respective VCR / LD players, as well as the growing popularity of Karaoke. Winson (潤程) was one of the first companies tapping into this golden opportunity in the laser disc business. With the collaboration of Wong Kam Fu of Star Paging Group fame, Winson Entertainment secured the very first laser disc deal of Golden Harvest films (with a joint venture with UK's Virgin Vision) in 1987, subsequently renamed into Star Entertainment (星光娛樂), later becoming a subsidiary of the Hong Kong-listed Star Entertainment International Holding in 1992. In 1992 the Heung brothers ended their partnership and Charles renamed Win's Movie Production (Hong Kong) Co Ltd (永盛電影製作 (香港) 有限公司) into Win's Entertainment (Hong Kong) Co Ltd. (永盛娛樂製作 (香港) 有限公司) Star Entertainment was eventually sold to China Star Group in 1996, while the founder of Winson (Sonny Chan) moved on to resurrect its label, engaging in distribution of VCD/DVD of old Cantonese films/opera as well as making a couple of modern films up to present time. In 1999, Charles closed down the Win's Entertainment studio, and founded another studio called "One Hundred Years of Film" (一百年電影有限公司). Charles continued to produce and present films under China Star. In 2009, the company has been returned and renamed as "Win's Movie and Television Production" (永盛影視製作有限公司), replacing One Hundred Years of Film. The company didn't last long and it was short-lived. The company went defunct in 2010.

== Subsidiaries ==
Subsidiaries of Win's Entertainment (Hong Kong) Co Ltd include production companies such as One Hundred Years of Film, China Star Entertainment Group, and Winson Entertainment/Star Entertainment.

=== Ocean Shores Video ===
Ocean Shores Video, the home video division of Win's Entertainment was an initial company in video production. It was a subsidiary of Ocean Shores Group. In 1982, it had roughly 520 videos in Betamax and VHS. The videos were distributed through three brands: Ocean Shores Video, Wild West Video, and Omni Video. The company's primary markets in 1982 were Europe and Southeast Asia, especially Malaysia and Singapore. By 1989, it was selling videos in Japan. In Hong Kong, it allowed members of a video club to borrow cassettes. Win's Entertainment acquired Ocean Shores Video in 1990, after which it started concentrating on distributing content for STAR TV, Media Asia, and other companies.
