= SPL II: A Time for Consequences =

2015 Hong Kong-Chinese film by Soi Cheang

- SPL II: A Time for Consequences film poster
- Traditional Chinese: 殺破狼2
- Simplified Chinese: 杀破狼2
- Hanyu Pinyin: Shā Pò Láng Èr
- Jyutping: Saat3 Po3 Long4 Ji6
- Directed by: Cheang Pou-soi
- Screenplay by: Wong Ying; Jill Leung
- Produced by: Wilson Yip; Paco Wong; Alex Dong
- Starring: Tony Jaa; Wu Jing; Simon Yam; Zhang Jin; Louis Koo
- Cinematography: Kenny Tse
- Edited by: David Richardson
- Music by: Chan Kwong-wing; Ken Chan
- Production companies: Sun Entertainment Culture Ltd; Sil-Metropole Organisation; Bona Film Group; Maximum Gain Kapital Group; Tin Tin Film Production
- Distributed by: Bravos Pictures
- Release date: 18 June 2015
- Running time: 120 minutes
- Countries: Hong Kong; China; Thailand
- Languages: Cantonese; Mandarin; Thai
- Budget: US$23 million
- Box office: US$90.27 million

SPL II: A Time for Consequences (also known as Sha Po Lang 2 or Kill Zone 2 in the worldwide) is a 2015 crime action film directed by Cheang Pou-soi. A Hong Kong-Chinese co-production, the film was produced by Wilson Yip, Paco Wong, and Alex Dong. The film stars Tony Jaa, Wu Jing, Simon Yam, Zhang Jin, with a special appearance by Louis Koo. The film was released on 18 June 2015 in both 3D and non-3D formats.

According to Twitch Film, SPL II is a sequel "in-name-only" to the 2005 film SPL: Sha Po Lang, which was directed by Wilson Yip and starred Donnie Yen, Sammo Hung and Simon Yam. SPL II featured a completely new storyline, with Wu Jing and Simon Yam from the first film returning as new characters, and introducing new cast members Louis Koo, Tony Jaa and Zhang Jin. Donnie Yen and Sammo Hung did not participate in the second film.

The film was later followed by a thematic sequel titled Paradox, which was released in 2017 and directed by Yip with Koo and Jaa returning as new characters.

== Plot ==
Kit is a Hong Kong undercover cop who becomes a drug addict to infiltrate a crime syndicate which has been kidnapping people and sending them to Thailand, where the victims are killed and have their organs sold in the black market. The mastermind behind the syndicate Mr Hung, has a rare heart condition and needs to undergo a heart transplant to prolong his life. Hung's younger brother is the ideal donor for a heart. When Hung sends his men to kidnap his brother, the situation goes haywire and a gunfight breaks out because the police have been tipped off by Kit about the kidnappers' plan. Hung's brother is injured during the shootout, but is rescued by the police. On the other hand, Kit escapes with the kidnappers but his cover is blown. Hung's men kill Kit's friend, knock Kit himself unconscious and sends him to a prison in Thailand.

A corrupt warden Ko Chun is working for Hung and has been keeping the kidnapped victims alive in the prison before they are killed for their organs. Kit is made to serve a life sentence in the prison. While in prison, Kit attempts to escape twice and fights with the prison guard Chatchai. but ends up being subdued every time. Chatchai's daughter Sa has leukaemia and needs to undergo a bone marrow transplant to survive. Chatchai witnesses Ko Chun's illegal activities and brutality, but forces himself to remain quiet because he does not want to lose his job. The donor who agreed to donate bone marrow to Sa is Kit. Back in Hong Kong, Hung reveals himself to Kit's uncle and supervisor named Wah, who is keeping a close watch on Hung's brother in hospital. Hung threatens Wah to hand over his brother to him in exchange for Kit.

Though initially agreed, Wah changes his mind and hides Hung's brother in his friend's house, where he assigns his subordinates behind to guard Hung's brother and sets to track down Kit's location in Thailand. An enraged Hung then sends his right-hand man Ah-Zai, a dangerous knife-wielding assassin to follow Wah's subordinates and take Hung's brother hostage. Ah-Zai easily murders every cop and snaps a picture of Hung's brother to Hung. In Thailand, Wah bribes Chatchai's colleague Kwong and enters the prison to find Kit. Shortly after Kit and Wah are reunited, they are discovered by Ko Chun, who captures them and orders Chatchai and Kwong to escort them to the hideout where victims are killed and have their organs removed. At the hideout, Kit and Wah break free from captivity and fight their way out. On the other hand, Chatchai and Kwong change their minds and turn back to help Kit and Wah. Kit, Wah and Kwong manage to escape despite sustaining very serious injuries during the fight. Chatchai is captured by Ko Chun's men, who ties him up and torture him.

Meanwhile, Hung's brother is brought to a medical centre in Thailand for the heart operation, but Kit breaks into the medical centre and takes Hung hostage, where he demands that Ko Chun bring Chatchai to him in exchange for Hung. A fight breaks out when Ko Chun and his men show up with Chatchai. Kit and Chatchai team up and defeat all of Ko Chun's men. At the same time, Hung breaks free from his restraints and attacks his brother, but his medical condition deteriorates and he becomes blind as a consequence. Hung dies as he tells his brother not to fear himself. Kit and Chatchai are seemingly no match for Ko Chun after engaging him in a long fight. At one point, Chatchai is knocked out after being stabbed by Ko Chun, who then proceeds to pound Kit against the window until the glass shatters.

While in his unconscious state, Chatchai has a vision of Sa in danger and immediately gets up and knocks Ko Chun out of the window. When he realises Kit has also fallen out of the window, Chatchai throws out a chain for Kit to hold on, but Ko Chun grabs the chain instead. Kit then grabs on to Ko Chun's tie and eventually strangles him to death while dangling from his tie. Chatchai stretches out his hand and pulls Kit back to safety. The movie ends with Sa now growing up narrates that she got the transplant and remembers Chatchai hugging her while Kit watches from a distance away.

== Cast ==
- Tony Jaa as Chatchai (阿猜德), a Thai prison guard.
- Wu Jing as Chan Chi-kit (陳志杰) "Kit" (杰), a Hong Kong undercover cop.
- Simon Yam as Chan Kwok-wah (陳國華) "Wah" (華), Kit's uncle and supervisor.
- Zhang Jin as Ko Chun (高晉), a corrupt warden of the Thai prison who works for Mr Hung.
- Louis Koo (special appearance) as Hung Man-kong (洪文剛) or Mr Hung (洪爺), the boss of the crime syndicate.
- Andrew Ng as Uncle On, assistant to Mr. Hung
- Ken Lo as Wong Kwong (黃光) or Kwong (光), Chatchai's colleague.
- Jun Kung as Hung Man-biu (洪文彪), Mr Hung's younger brother.
- Dominic Lam as Cheung Chun-tung (張振東), Wah's superior in the police force.
- Babyjohn Choi as Kwok Chun-yat (郭俊一), Wah's subordinate.
- Wilson Tsui as Dai-hau (大口), Wah's subordinate.
- Unda Kunteera Yhordchanng as Sa (莎), Chatchai's daughter.
- Candy Yuen as Fong Wing-kum (方詠琴), Hung Mun-biu's wife.
- Philip Keung as Fan Ging-hung (范勁雄), the boss of a smuggling ring.
- Eddie Pang as Hung's henchman
- Zhang Chi as Ah-zai (亞囝), Hung's knife-wielding henchman.

== Production ==
With a budget of US$23 million, filming started on 1 May 2014 and concluded on 6 September 2014.

== Release ==
The first trailer was released on 23 March 2015. The film was released in Hong Kong and China on June 18, 2015.

== Reception ==
=== Box office ===
The film grossed an estimated US$43.36 million in its four-day opening weekend, debuting at No. 2 at the Chinese box office behind Jurassic World and third place worldwide behind Jurassic World and Inside Out.

=== Critical reception ===
On Review aggregator Rotten Tomatoes the website gives the film a score of 100% based on 23 reviews, with an average rating of 7.17/10. Metacritic, which uses a weighted average gives the film a score of 73/100 based on 9 reviews, indicating "generally favorable reviews".

On The Hollywood Reporter, Elizabeth Kerr called the film "a tight, entertaining action flick". Joe Leydon of Variety called it "a martial-arts noir melodrama that neatly entwines operatic outbursts of emotion with bodacious bouts of butt kicking." Derek Elley of Film Business Asia gave the film a score of 6/10 and called it "a big, splashy mess, with a chaotic script."

== Sequel ==
The third film in the SPL series, Paradox, was released in China and Hong Kong on 17 August 2017 and 25 August 2017, respectively. The film featured Wilson Yip returning to the director's chair while Cheang Pou-soi served as producer and stars Louis Koo, Tony Jaa and Ken Lo returning in different roles alongside new cast members Gordon Lam, Wu Yue and Chris Collins. Sammo Hung, who appeared in SPL: Sha Po Lang, served as the action director for Paradox.
