= Womb Ghosts =

2010 Hong Kong film by Dennis Law

- Film poster
- Directed by: Dennis Law
- Written by: Dennis Law
- Produced by: Dennis Law
- Starring: Chrissie Chau; Lam Suet; Koni Lui; Lai Lok-yi
- Cinematography: Edmond Fung
- Edited by: Yau Chi-wai
- Music by: Tommy Wai
- Distributed by: Point of View Movie Production Co. Ltd.
- Release date: 18 March 2010
- Running time: 88 minutes
- Country: Hong Kong
- Language: Cantonese

Womb Ghosts (simplified Chinese: 恶胎; traditional Chinese: 惡胎) is a 2010 Hong Kong horror film directed and written by Dennis Law.

== Plot ==
The film follows two women: Zoe (Chrissie Chau), a club hostess suffering from repeated miscarriages, and Winnie (Koni Lui), a nurse struggling in a relationship with her doctor boyfriend who has been injecting her with contraceptives to prevent pregnancy. Both women begin to experience supernatural encounters as they are haunted by the ghosts of aborted children who have been enslaved by a dark shaman.

== Cast ==
- Chrissie Chau as Kwok Siu-fong/Zoe Kwok
- Lam Suet as Kwok Lok
- Koni Lui as Shum Luk-ping/Winnie Shum
- Lai Lok-yi as Lei Yi-cheung/Joseph Lee
- Maggie Shiu as Madame Joyce
- Jo Koo as Ho Chi-ting/Miss T
- Shermon Tang as Jay
- Dada Lo as Wong Fong-ling/Joey Wong/Jena

== Release ==
The film was released on 18 March 2010 in Hong Kong. Womb Ghosts debuted as the eighth highest-grossing film for the weekend on its premiere. The next week, it charted at ninth place. The film has grossed $211,004 in Hong Kong.

== Reception ==
Twitch Film gave the film a generally favorable review while noting that "others will simply see this as another boring Asian ghost flick and it's difficult to contradict them. Even though the film is visually attractive, boasts a solid soundtrack and some decent acting, it's really not all that different from its peers." Film Business Asia gave a rating of four out of ten, stating that Womb Ghosts "has some squirmy moments but is shackled by a confused script."
