= Koni Lui =

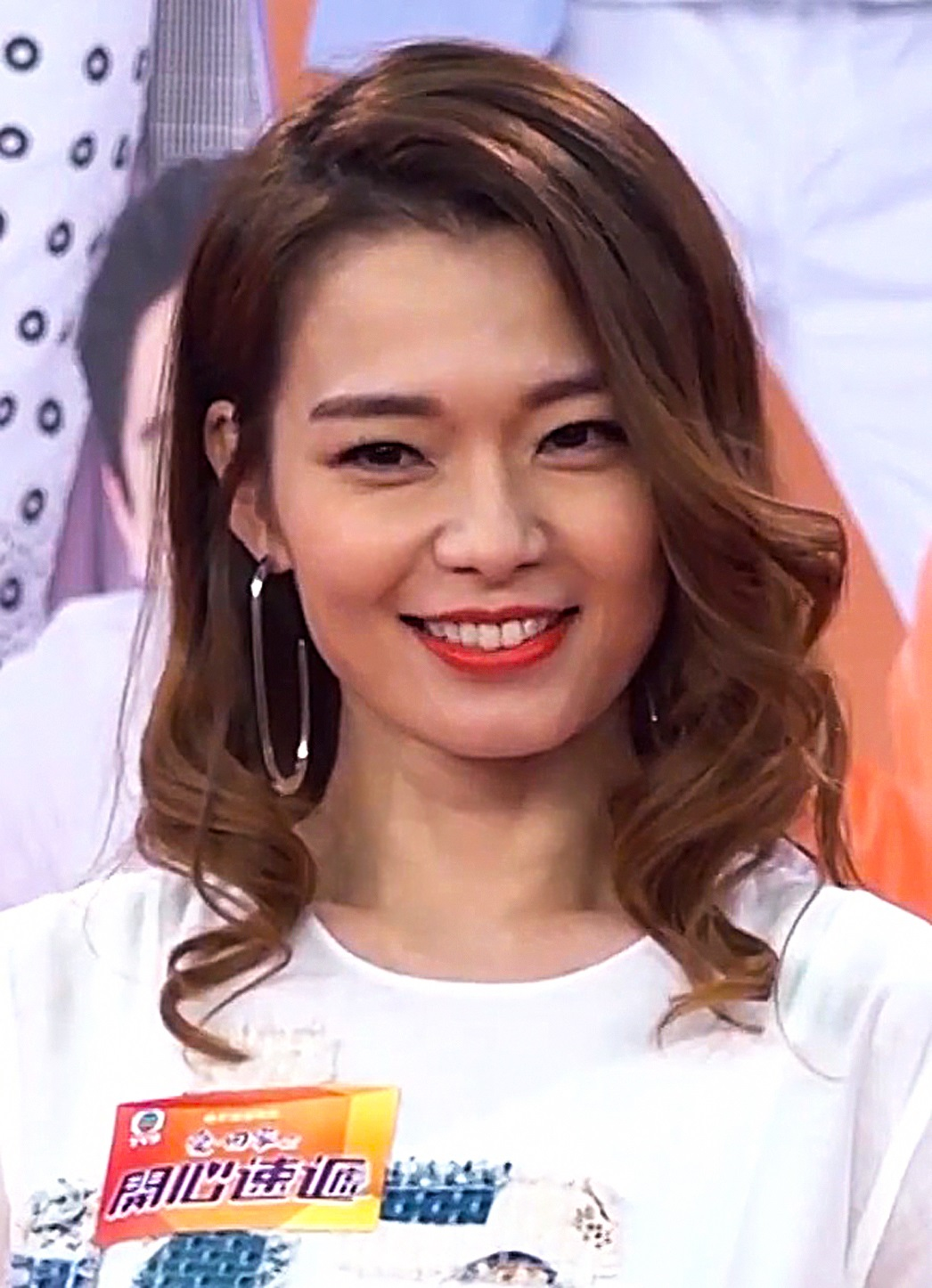
- Lui in 2019
- Born: 3 September 1982 (age 44); Hong Kong
- Education: Hong Kong University of Science and Technology (BEng)
- Spouse: Dickson Wong (m. 2011; div. 2018)

Chinese name
- Traditional Chinese: 呂慧儀
- Simplified Chinese: 吕慧仪
Transcriptions
Standard Mandarin
- Hanyu Pinyin: Liú Huìyí
- Musical career
- Also known as: Konnie Lui, 謎女郎, 長腳蟹 (Long-Legged Crab)
- Origin: Hong Kong

Koni Lui Wai Yee (呂慧儀; born 3 September 1982 in Hong Kong) is a Hongkonger actress, model and beauty pageant titleholder who placed 2nd runner up at the Miss Hong Kong 2006 pageant. She represented Hong Kong at Miss International 2006 in Tokyo, Japan and Beijing, China. She received two awards, Most Beautiful Smile and the Miss Friendship award. She won four Miss Friendship titles (2001, 2002, 2004, and 2005). With her win, Hong Kong is tied with Japan as the only nations at Miss International to win more than four Miss Friendships and at any international pageant.

Prior to Miss Hong Kong 2006, Koni Lui had also competed in the 2001 Elite Look of the Year HK contest, finishing 2nd and winning the Photogenic prize (Miss Hong Kong 2005)

Lui played a pregnant woman who had a miscarriage in the horror film Womb Ghosts that was released on March 18, 2010.

== Filmography ==
=== Television ===
Year	Title	Role	Notes
2007	Best Selling Secrets 同事三分親	Daisy	Guest Star (ep. 192)
2008	Catch Me Now 原來愛上賊	Wong Ming-cheung 汪明翔	Other names: 長腳蟹 Long legged crab
2009	You're Hired 絕代商驕	Vivian	Most Improved Actress Nomination (Top 5)
2009	A Watchdog's Tale 老友狗狗	Ma Cheuk-Ling 馬卓玲	
2010	O.L. Supreme 女王辦公室	Sung Cho-man 宋初敏	
2011	7 Days in Life 隔離七日情	Liu Ho-yan (Judy) 廖可人	
2011	Dropping by Cloud Nine		
2011	Wax and Wane		Guest star ep. 30
2012	Queens of Diamonds and Hearts 東西宮略	Chung Mo-wai 鍾無慧	
2013	Sergeant Tabloid 女警愛作戰	Lam Long-ning 林朗寧	Warehoused; released overseas April 2012; Other names: Long leg
2014	Never Dance Alone 女人俱樂部	Mandy	
2014	Lady Sour 醋娘子	Ning Choi Tze 冷采慈	
2016	Fashion War 潮流教主	Zita Hung Si-ting 洪詩婷	
2016	House of Spirits 一屋老友記	Fiona Tsui Fai 余花	TVB Star Award Malaysia 2016 - My Favourite Top 15 TVB drama characters Nomination - TVB Anniversary Award 2016 for Best Supporting Actress; Nomination - TVB Anniversary Award 2016 for Best drama character
2017	Tiger Mom Blues 親親我好媽	Rebecca Yuen Yuen 高袁圓	Other names: Princess Rebecca
2017	Come Home Love: Lo and Behold 愛回家之開心速遞	Mary Hung Yeuk Shui 熊若水	

=== Film ===
Year	Title	Role	Notes
2009	A Very Short Life	Barbara	
2009	Turning Point	Brother One's girlfriend	
2010	72 Tenants of Prosperity	Chai Wan	
2010	Womb Ghosts	Winnie	
2011	I Love Hong Kong	Koni	
2011	Microsex Office	Rachel	
2012	I Love Hong Kong 2012		
2013	Laughing Every Day		
2013	I Love Hong Kong 2013		

Awards and achievements
Miss Hong Kong
Preceded by Carrie Lam 林 莉	Miss Hong Kong 2nd Runner-Up; 2006	Succeeded by Loretta Chow 周美欣
