= Liz Lieu =

Vietnamese poker player (born 1974)

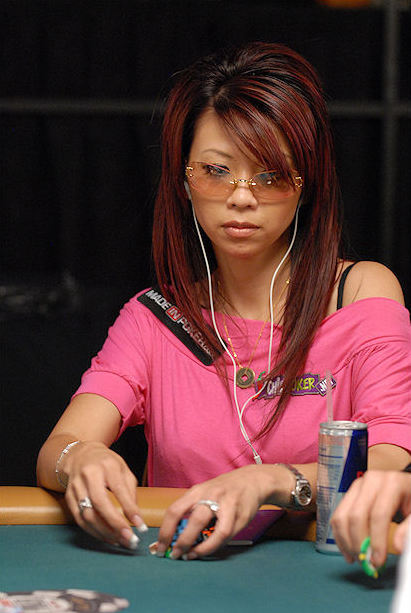
- Liz Lieu playing the 2009 WSOP Main Event
- Nickname: Poker Diva
- Born: August 2, 1974 (age 52)

World Series of Poker
- Bracelet: None
- Money finishes: 6
- Highest WSOP Main Event finish: None

World Poker Tour
- Title: None
- Final table: None
- Money finishes: 2

European Poker Tour
- Title: None
- Final table: None
- Money finish: 1

Liz Lieu (born August 2, 1974, in Vietnam) is a Vietnamese professional poker player.

Lieu was primarily a limit Texas hold 'em cash games player for a number of years, before embracing tournament play at the 2005 World Series of Poker. When John Phan encouraged her to enter the $1500 no-limit hold'em event, she ended up in fifth place with over $168,000 in prize money. She went on to place 12th in the $5000 no-limit hold'em event the same year and cashed in the $3000 tournament as well.

The next stop was the Bellagio's 2005 Festa Al Lago tournament, where she placed fourth in the $2500 no limit hold'em event and 16th in two other top tournaments in the series, taking home more than $80,000 for less than a week's worth of work. She went on to finish in the top ten spots at the World Poker Finals, Five Diamond World Poker Classic, and the Gold Strike World Poker Open.

Lieu's first tournament win came at the 2006 L.A. Poker Classic at Commerce Casino, where she won the $1,060 limit hold'em event. Her second tournament win came when she won the same event in 2007.

In 2006, Lieu was honored by the WSOP and ESPN as a "Final Table Grand Marshal" along with Johnny Chan.

In September 2007 Lieu signed an exclusive partnership with Chilipoker and acts as an Ambassador for the poker room.

As of 2010, Lieu has earned over $825,000 in live tournament play.

In 2009, she appeared in Hong Kong movie Poker King as herself.
