= Poker King =

2009 Hong Kong film by Chan Hing-ka and Janet Chun

- Theatrical release poster
- Directed by: Chan Hing-ka; Janet Chun
- Written by: Chan Hing-ka; Janet Chun; Debbie Lam
- Produced by: Chan Hing-ka; Janet Chun
- Starring: Louis Koo; Sean Lau
- Cinematography: Horace Wong
- Edited by: Matthew Hui
- Music by: Chiu Tsang-Hei; Andy Cheung Yan-Kit
- Production companies: Icon Pictures; Sun City Group
- Distributed by: China Star Entertainment
- Release date: 22 October 2009
- Running time: 122 minutes
- Country: Hong Kong
- Language: Cantonese

Poker King (simplified Chinese: 扑克王; traditional Chinese: 撲克王) is a 2009 Hong Kong comedy film co-written and directed by Chan Hing-ka and Janet Chun and starring Louis Koo and Sean Lau.

== Plot ==
Uno (Lau Ching Wan), a small-time crook turned casino magnate, and Jack, the scion of a Macau gaming clan lead very different lives until fate brings them together in a poker duel of a lifetime.

The setting is Macau, Las Vegas of the Orient, where the buzz in town is that Uno has snared the operations of the venerable Sun Casinos from its deceased owner. In a bid to clear his name, he has the sole heir Jack (Louis Koo) brought back from Canada where he spent the last few years in hiding. Jack, an inept businessman and a socially awkward young man, spent his days playing online poker. When it became clear that he has neither the instinct nor the skills to take over, Uno invokes the owner's will and takes charge of Jack's family business.

Disillusioned and depressed, Jack runs into Smiley (Stephy Tang), a simple girl with a seemingly unstoppable good fortune. Together the pair conquers the poker rooms in Macau. Jack played in Uno's arch rival Ms. Fong's (Josie Ho) casino and met her. He requested to represent her casino in the ultimate Poker King tournament to beat Uno. As Jack issues a personal challenge to Uno, it becomes clear that it isn't only bragging rights at stake, but also the throne to the gambling empire that Jack's father had built.

In the Poker King Tournament, Jack and Uno reached the final round along with Uno's henchmen. To build up Uno's playing chips, all the henchmen purposely lost to Uno leaving Jack to face Uno as the last two players. In the last game, Jack and Uno had the same set of cards but of different suits. The last card dealt out gave Jack the victory and he also reclaimed back his father's casino. It was revealed via several flashbacks, Uno built up the casino with Jack's father and the casino was to be passed down to Jack. However, if Jack is incapable, Uno will inherit the casino. However, Uno added a condition that he will only inherit the casino if Jack remains a good-for-nothing. Jack also revealed that he was also a competent poker player all along under the tutelage of a master poker player but feigned weakness to assess Uno's competence at managing the casino. With renewed respect for each other, they became friends and Uno was eventually rehired by Jack as the casino group's CEO while Jack will travel around the world with his teacher and participate in various poker tournament.

== Cast ==
- Louis Koo as Jack Cheung
- Sean Lau as Uno
- Josie Ho as Ms. Fong
- Stephy Tang as Smiley
- Cherrie Ying as Season
- Kama Lo as Lucky
- Jo Kuk as Joan
- Wong You-Nam as Ho
- Lam Suet as Annoying gambler
- Jacky Heung as David Lin
- Cheung Siu-Fai as Fei
- Joe Cheung as Fernado

=== Professional players ===
Some notable professional poker players including David Rheem, Nam Le, Liz Lieu, James Sudworth, Michael Marvanek, Christer Andersson, Winfred Yu and Johnny Chan appeared in the film.

== Release ==
Poker King was released in Hong Kong on 22 October 2009. The film was released on DVD and VCD on 18 December 2009 and Blu-ray Disc on 5 January 2010. Releases include a Blu-ray edition with bonus DVD containing making of and interviews with poker champions Winfred Yu and Johnny Chan; DVD + Playing Cards edition; and a Special Edition DVD with a lenticular cover instead of the regular DVD case, a deck of playing cards, and a notebook.
