= Bad Blood (2010 film) =

2010 Hong Kong film by Dennis Law

- Film poster
- Traditional Chinese: 滅門
- Simplified Chinese: 灭门
- Hanyu Pinyin: Miè Mén
- Jyutping: Mit^{6} Mun^{4}
- Directed by: Dennis S.Y. Law
- Written by: Dennis S.Y. Law
- Produced by: Dennis S.Y. Law
- Starring: Simon Yam; Bernice Liu; Andy On; Luxia Jiang; Ken Lo; Chan Wai-Man; Xiong Xin Xin; Pinky Cheung; Lai Lok-Yi; Amy Chum; Wong Tin-lam; Cheung Siu-fai; Lam Suet
- Cinematography: Herman Yau
- Edited by: Azrael Chung
- Music by: Tommy Wai
- Distributed by: Point of View Movie Production Co. Ltd. (HK)
- Release date: 21 January 2010
- Running time: 95 minutes
- Country: Hong Kong
- Language: Cantonese

Bad Blood (US King of Triads) is a 2010 Hong Kong martial arts-crime film written, produced and directed by Dennis Law. The film features an ensemble cast that includes Simon Yam, Bernice Liu and Andy On. Bad Blood centers on a Triad gang as the members plot and scheme against each other to become the gang's new leader, after the death of their boss. The film was released in Hong Kong on 21 January 2010.

== Plot ==
The film begins with escaping prisoners Funky (Simon Yam), Calf (Andy On), Hung (Ken Lo), Kong (Xiong Xin Xin) and Andy Lok (Cheung Siu-fai) on the run from several Chinese (People's Armed Police) officers somewhere in China. Though Funky and his crew manage to fight off the guards, he and Andy Lok the crime boss of their gang get separated with the others while protecting something very valuable to Mr Lok's company. As the others reach their escape meeting an elderly gang ally named Zen, they realize Funky and Andy Lok are still trying to catch up. Just as Andy Lok tries to make a last-ditch attempt to escape he is hit by a truck which was actually part of a trap by the PAP officers and is captured, while Funky hides in the bushes apparently foreseeing it coming.

Sometime later, Andy Lok's sister Audrey Lok (Bernice Liu) is sitting in silence at a public execution. Just as the PAP officers execute one man, Andy Lok's weeps once last time before being executed by an officers AK-47. Audrey prompts leaves the execution site and meetings with her will bearer Peter Wong (Lam Suet) who discusses her brother's will.

As Audrey Lok tries to settle her brother's will at her house. It becomes evidently that her brother's co-workers only want her money and her brother's power and soon mysterious conspiracies leading to murder schemes begin to follow.

Audrey realizes what she wants and becomes a great fighter. She fights and kills, striving only to be triad leader. She manipulates Calf into helping her kill the other Triad members. Calf manages to eliminate several of the Triads but is eventually betrayed and murdered in cold blood by Audrey, after she has no use for him anymore. Audrey manages to kill the other Triads in her way as well, but eventually becomes more violent and aggressive to a point where she even mercilessly murders members of her own family just to secure leadership for herself.

At the end, the will reveals that Audrey and her brother's father wanted his children to leave Hong Kong and have a better life while the gang leadership will go to the co-workers. However, Audrey got greedy, and betrayed her brother and everyone in between, killing them all and only used Calf to help kill the Triads she could not face herself. In the final showdown, Dumby - Calf's student - fights Audrey after learning she has murdered Calf as well. At first Audrey gains the upper hand and brutally beats down Dumby, however Dumby as a last resort manages to grab and pin down Audrey and cook a live hand grenade. Dumby is gunned down by Audrey's bodyguards but Audrey's panics as she is not able to escape's Dumbys grasp. The grenade explodes, blowing Audrey into shredded pieces and killing the remaining bodyguards, putting an end to Audrey's reign as a cold sociopathic gang leader.

== Cast ==
- Simon Yam as Funky
- Bernice Liu as Audrey Lok
- Andy On as Calf
- Jiang Luxia as Dumby
- Ken Lo as Hung
- Chan Wai-Man as Zen
- Xiong Xin Xin as Kong
- Pinky Cheung
- Lai Lok-Yi as Jason Lok
- Amy Chum
- Wong Tin-lam
- Eddie Cheung as Andy Lok
- Lam Suet as Peter Wong
- Amy Tam
- Jack Wong
- Candy Hau

== Production ==
Bad Blood was written, production and directed by Dennis Law, and produced and distributed by Law's company Point of View Movie Production Co. Ltd. Nicky Li, a Jackie Chan Stunt Team member who has previously collaborated with Law, served as the film's fight choreographer.

== Release ==
Bad Blood was released in Hong Kong on 21 January 2010.
