= Welcome to the House =

Sitcom

- 高朋滿座
- Genre: Modern Sitcom
- Starring: Lawrence Cheng; Christine Ng; Chung King Fai; Angelina Lo; Raymond Cho; Johnson Lee; Shermon Tang; Kingdom Yuen; Gill Mohindepaul Singh
- Opening theme: "細路仔" by Cast
- Country of origin: Hong Kong
- Original language: Cantonese
- No. of episodes: 239

Production
- Running time: 20 minutes (approx)

Original release
- Network: TVB
- Release: April 10, 2006 – March 10, 2007

Welcome to the House (Traditional Chinese: 高朋滿座) is a TVB modern sitcom series broadcast from April 2006 to March 2007.

The series surrounded the day-to-day lives of the Ko family.

== Cast ==
Cast	Role	Description
Lawrence Cheng	Ko Yau-Pang 高有朋	Culinary Instructor; Cheung Yuet-Moon's husband. Ko Wai-Ting's father. Ko Yau-Yee and Ko Yau-Ching's older brother. Ko Hing's son.
Christine Ng	Cheung Yuet-Moon (Frances) 章悅滿	Yoga Instructor; Ko Yau-Pang's wife. Ko Wai-Ting's mother. Chueng Yat-Moon's older sister.
Chung King Fai	Ko Hing 高慶	Chinese Herb Doctor; Ko Yau-Pang, Ko Yau-Yee, and Ko Yau-Ching's father. Ho Miu-Hei's husband. Ko Lai's stepbrother.
Angelina Lo (盧宛茵)	Ho Miu-Hei 何妙喜	Ko Hing's second wife.
Raymond Cho	Ko Yau-Yee (Sunny) 高有義	Insurance Agent; Ko Yau-Pang and Ko Yau-Ching's brother. Ko Hing's son.
Johnson Lee	Cheung Yat-Moon 章溢滿	Courier; Cheung Yuet-Moon's younger brother.
Shermon Tang	Ko Yau-Ching (Shirlee) 高有情	Snack Shop Owner; Ko Yau-Pun and Ko Yau-Yee's younger sister. Ko Hing's daughter.
Kingdom Yuen (苑瓊丹)	Ko Lai 高麗	Ko Hing's half sister.
Lai Suen (黎宣)	So Lai-Sai 蘇黎細	So Gan's mother. So Fa's guardian.
Chiang Chi Kwong (蔣志光)	So Gan 蘇根	So Lai-Sai's son.
Sharon Chan	So Fa 蘇花	Health Product Shop Clerk; So Lai-Sai's adopted daughter.
Nancy Wu	Tong Tong (Sugar) 唐棠	Courier Company Clerk; Cheung Yat-Moon's friend.
Gill Mohindepaul Singh	Law Hung-Lei (Henry) 羅亨利	Yoga instructor Chueng Yuet-Moon's partner.
Annie Wong	Ko Wai-Ting (Ko B) 高蕙婷	High School Student; Ko Yau-Pang and Cheung Yuet-Moon's daughter.
