= Cheung Siu-fai =

Hong Kong actor

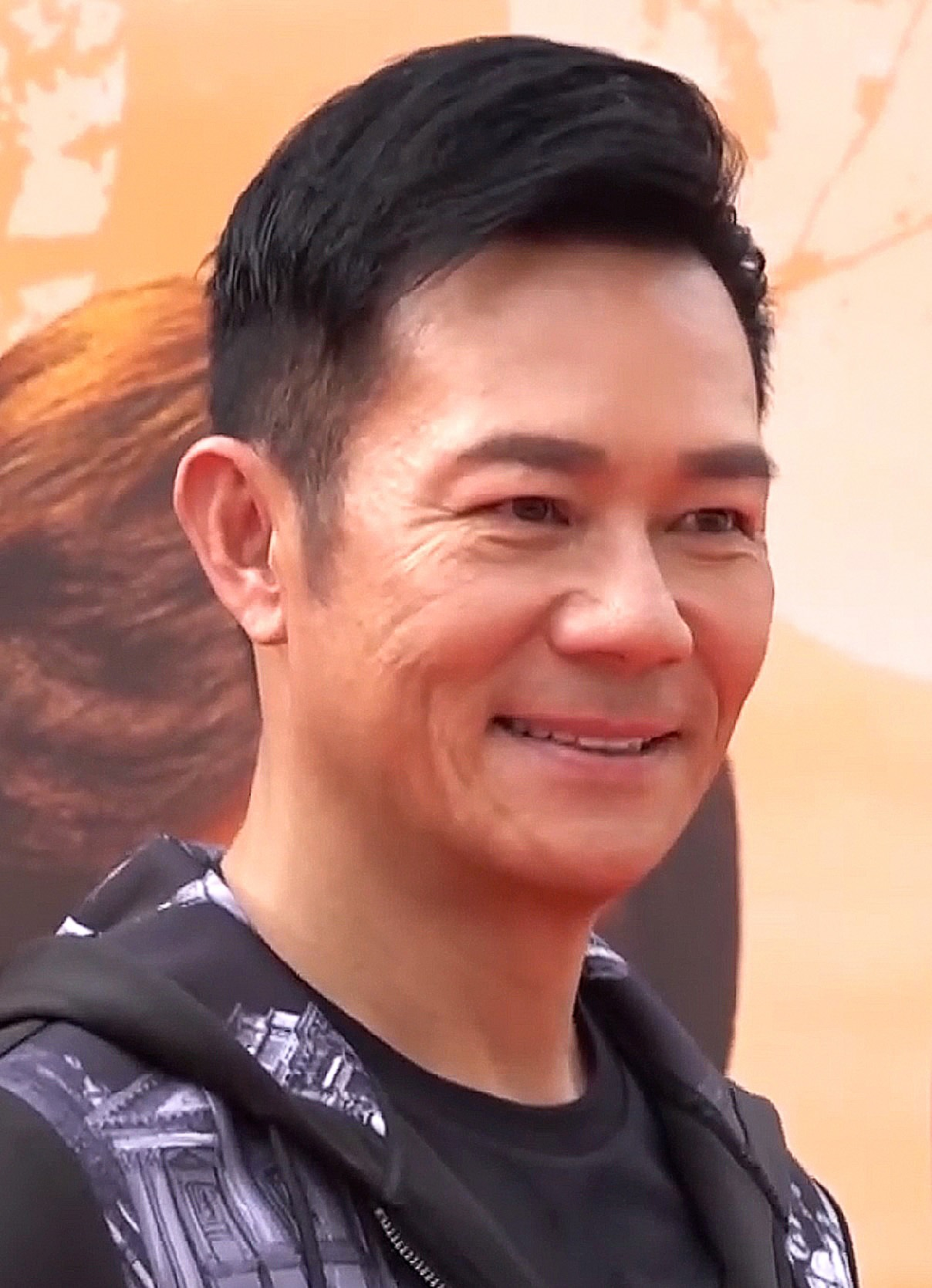
- Cheung in 2020
- Born: 4 February 1963 (age 63); Hong Kong
- Occupation: Actor
- Years active: 1982–present

Chinese name
- Traditional Chinese: 張兆輝
- Simplified Chinese: 张兆辉
Transcriptions
Standard Mandarin
- Hanyu Pinyin: Zhāng Zhàohuī
- IPA: [ʈʂáŋ ʈʂâuxwéi]
Yue: Cantonese
- Yale Romanization: Jēung Siuhfāi
- Jyutping: Zoeng1 Siu6fai1
- IPA: [tsœ́ŋ sìufɐ́i]

Cheung Siu-fai (Chinese: 張兆輝; born 4 February 1963), also known as Eddie Cheung, is a Hong Kong actor. He is best known for his many supporting or everyman roles similar to Liu Kai-chi.

== Filmography ==
=== Film ===
Year	Title	Role	Notes
1989	Hearts No Flowers		
1990	Fatal Passion		
1993	Double or Nothing		TV movie
1993	The Bare-Footed Kid	Magistrate Yuan Tien-Yu	a.k.a. The Barefoot Kid a.k.a. Young Hero
1996	Deadly Showdown	Ju Tin-long	TV movie
2000	Spicy Aces		
2001	The Bird of Prey	Lee Gwok-gei	TV movie
2003	Running on Karma	Captain Chung	a.k.a. An Intelligent Muscle Man
2004	Breaking News	Supt. Eric Yeung	
2004	Throw Down	Boss Savage	
2005	The Unusual Youth	Kwok Sir	
2005	Election	Mr. So	
2005	The House	Ray / Officer Wai	
2006	McDull, the Alumni	Financial controller	
2006	2 Become 1	Penny's husband	
2006	Election 2	Mr. So	a.k.a. Election 2: Harmony Is a Virtue a.k.a. Triad Election
2006	Dog Bite Dog	Chief Inspector Sum	
2006	Fatal Contact	Ma Ho-keung	
2006	Exiled	Jeff	
2006	Wise Guys Never Die	Dragon	
2007	The Closet	Ngok Fung (Frank)	
2007	Kidnap	Sgt. Ho Chi	a.k.a. Chain Game
2007	Eye in the Sky	Senior Insp. Chan	
2007	Beauty and the 7 Beasts	Tony	
2007	Brothers	Fruit stall keeper	
2007	Mad Detective	One of Chi-Wai's personalities	
2008	Fatal Move	Law Ting-fat	
2008	Connected	Detective Cheung	
2009	Gao Xing	Wei Da	
2009	A Very Short Life	Dennis Law	
2009	Coweb		
2009	The First 7th Night	Chan Keung	a.k.a. Who is Him? a.k.a. False Memory a.k.a. 1st 7 Day
2009	Murderer	Ghost	
2009	Vengeance	Wolf	a.k.a. Revenge
2009	Poker King	Fei	
2010	Bad Blood	Andy	
2010	Illusion Apartment		
2010	All About Love	Robert	
2010	Bruce Lee, My Brother	Cho Tat-wah	
2011	The Detective 2	Leung Wai-yip	
2011	The Loan Shark		
2011	Life Without Principle		
2013	Drug War	Su	
2013	Out of Inferno	Shun	
2013	The Constable		
2013	Firestorm	truck driver	
2014	Golden Chicken 3	Brother Siu Fai	
2014	The Monkey King	Li Jing	
2014	Z Storm	Yu Hung-sing	
2014	Twilight Online	Sir Gu	
2015	Blackhat	Chow	
2015	The Strange House		
2015	Office	Suen Keung	
2016	Three	Dr. Fok	
2016	Sky on Fire		
2017	The Big Call	Inspector Tan	
2019	Theory of Ambitions		
2021	Dynasty Warriors	Chen Gong	
2021	G Storm	Yu Hung-sing	
2025	Behind the Shadows		

=== Television series ===
Year	Title	Role	Notes
1982	Hong Kong '82		
1982	Soldier of Fortune	student	
1982	Demi-Gods and Semi-Devils		
1983	My Way		
1983	The Bold Ones		
1985	Hong Kong '85	Cheung Cheung	
1986	Siblings of Vice and Virtue	Lau Jing-fai	
1986	The Upheaval		
1986	The Turbulent Decade	Tin Wing-tai	
1987	The Seasons	Ho Jan-kwok	
1987	Love in a Decadent City	Gung Kai-gwong	
1987	The Making of a Gentleman		
1988	Withered in the Wind	Duen Yuk-yin	
1988	Fate Cast of the Wind		
1988	The Saga of the Lost Kingdom	Yip Yun	
1988	The Undercover Story	Pun Gai-dang	
1988	Battle in the Royale Court	Chu Kei-yuk	
1989	The Reincarnated of Wai		
1989	Everybody Loves Somebody		
1990	The Enforcer's Experience	Yu Hon-chun	
1990	The Self Within		
1990	Where I Belong	Hau Sai-git	
1990	The Hunter’s Prey	Chu Gwan-yu	
1990	An Elite's Choice	Dun Wong	
1991	A Tale of One City	Tut Sing-lung	
1991	Be My Guest	Tze Dik-man	
1991	The Black Sabre	Yip Hoi	
1992	Beyond Love	Lee Sou-dai	
1993	Being Honest	Ou Ping-tan	
1993	The Heroes from Shaolin	Hung Tai	
1993	The Hero from Shanghai	Ngok Jan	
1993	All About Tin	Kuk Yan	
1994	The Emperor and I	Kin Lung	
1995	Plain Love	Gwan Tin-yam	
1995	Detective Investigation Files II	Wong Tze-tou	
1996	Dark Tales III	Mou Sing-yau	
1996	Cold Blood Warm Heart	Chan Fei-hong	
1996	Ancient Heroes	Lee Sai-man	
1996	Food of Love	Ching Seung-lai	
1997	The Hitman Chronicles	Yung Jing	
1997	Against the Blade of Honour	Lau Yeuk-chung	A Cheap Man Who Sells His Wife For Sword Manuals
1997	I Can't Accept Corruption	Lim Tze-gong	
1998	ICAC Investigators 1998	Ko Jin-fai	
1999	The Flying Fox of Snowy Mountain	Tin Kwai-nung	
1999	Detective Investigation Files IV	Lok Wai-gei	
1999	Unnatural Born Killer	Yeung Wan-ching	
1999	Ultra Protection	Fu Jing-git	
1999	Road to Eternity	Tong Tai-jung	
2000	The Heaven Sword and Dragon Saber	Yeung Siu	Warehoused and later broadcast in 2001
2000	Armed Reaction II	Yeung Gwong-jiu	
2001	Seven Sisters	Chou Jan-cheung	
2002	Love is Beautiful	emperor	
2002	Police Station No. 7	Yip Ka-sing	Warehoused and later broadcast in 2004
2002	Lofty Waters Verdant Bow	Lee Ying	
2011-2012	Til Love Do Us Lie	Suen Ga-on	
2013	Sniper Standoff	Ko Chun-kin	
2016	Come with Me	Mok Tai-hung	
2017	The No No Girl	Chong Fu-ho	
2017	Fighter of the Destiny		
2018	Flying Tiger	Lei Zhuofeng	
2020	Of Greed and Ants	Gordon Wing Muk-tung / Ma Chi-lik	
2020	The Song of Glory	Shen Tingzhang	
2020	Count Your Lucky Stars	Lu Ren	
2021	Flying Tiger 3	Cheung Wai-wah	
2023	Story of Kunning Palace	Yan Mu	
