= Wu Jing (actor) =

Chinese actor and martial artist (born 1974)

- 吴京
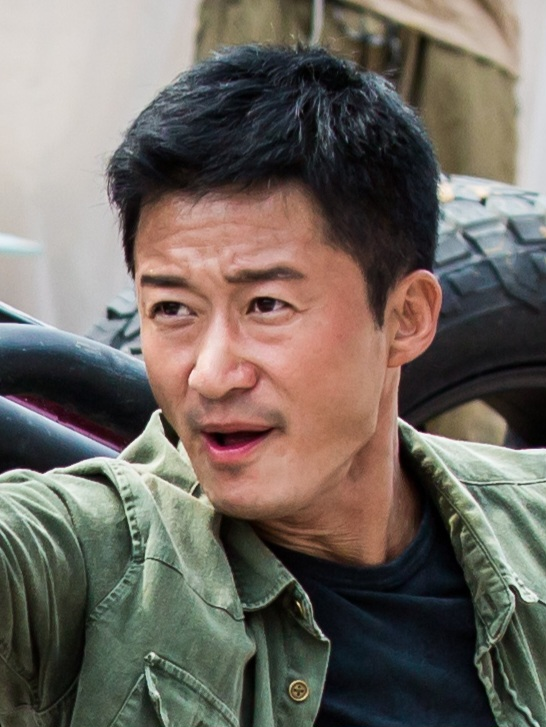
- Wu on the set of Wolf Warrior 2
- Born: 3 April 1974 (age 52); Beijing, China
- Other names: Jing Wu; Jacky Wu
- Education: Beijing Sport University
- Occupations: Actor; martial artist; director
- Years active: 1995–present
- Agent: Gold Typhoon
- Spouse: Xie Nan (m. 2014)
- Children: 2

Chinese name
- Simplified Chinese: 吴京
- Traditional Chinese: 吳京
Transcriptions
Standard Mandarin
- Hanyu Pinyin: Wú Jīng

Wu Jing (Chinese: 吴京; pinyin: Wú Jīng; born 3 April 1974), also known as Jacky Wu, is a Chinese actor, martial artist and director of Manchu descent. Wu achieved his breakthrough with the film Wolf Warrior (2015), which he directed and acted in, establishing himself as a leading action star. He is also known for his roles in television dramas such as Legend of Dagger Lee (1999) and Eternity: A Chinese Ghost Story (2003), and films such as Fatal Contact (2006), the Sha Po Lang films, The Wandering Earth films, The Battle at Lake Changjin (2021) and Blades of the Guardians (2026).

Wu ranked 1st on the Forbes China Celebrity 100 list in 2019 and 23rd in 2020.

== Career ==
In April 1995, Wu was spotted by martial arts choreographer Yuen Woo-ping, Wu played Hawkman / Jackie in 1996 film Tai Chi Boxer, his Hong Kong film debut. Since then Wu has appeared in numerous mainland Chinese wuxia television series. He also worked with choreographer and director Lau Kar-leung in 2003 film Drunken Monkey. Wu achieved success in Hong Kong action cinema for his role as a vicious assassin in 2005 film SPL: Sha Po Lang.

In 2006, Wu continued his move into Hong Kong cinema by starring in the film Fatal Contact. Wu is the male lead in 2007 film Twins Mission, starring the Twins duo. He also worked on the police action film Invisible Target which was released in July 2007.

In March 2008, Wu made his directorial debut, alongside action choreographer Nicky Li, on his film Legendary Assassin. Wu played the Assassin in The Mummy: Tomb of the Dragon Emperor his American film debut.

Wu played Jing Neng in 2011 martial arts film Shaolin alongside Nicholas Tse, Andy Lau and Jackie Chan. Wu reprised a different role as Chan Chi-kit in the 2015 Hong Kong action film SPL II: A Time for Consequences.

Wu directed and starred in the action war film Wolf Warrior and its 2017 sequel Wolf Warrior 2. The latter film has become a hit at the Chinese summer box office and became the highest-grossing film in China.

In 2019, Wu starred in hit film The Wandering Earth, based on a novella of the same name by Liu Cixin. When he discovered that the production team lacked funds to complete the film, he invested his own money to make up for the shortfall. The film ended up grossing $700 million worldwide, including $691 million in China but only 9 million for the rest of the world combined. It became China's third highest-grossing film of all time, 2019's third highest-grossing film worldwide, the second highest-grossing non-English film to date, and one of the top 20 highest-grossing science fiction films to date.

== Personal life ==
Wu Jing and Xie Nan's relationship began in 2012 and they got married in 2014. On 25 August 2014, Xie Nan gave birth to their first child, a son Wu Suowei (吴所谓) (also named as Wu You (吴滺)). On 24 September 2018, they had a second son Wu Lü (吴律).

== Filmography ==
=== Film ===
Year	English title	Chinese title	Role	Notes/Ref.
1996	Tai Chi Boxer	功夫小子闖情關	Young Xuewen	
2001	The Legend of Zu	蜀山傳	Lian Xing	
2003	Drunken Monkey	醉猴	Chan Chiud	
2005	SPL: Sha Po Lang	殺破狼	Jack	
2006	A Foreign Luck	天上掉餡餅	Liuliu	
2006	Fatal Contact	黑拳	Kong Ko	
2007	Twins Mission	雙子神偷	Lau Hay / Lau San	
2007	Invisible Target	男兒本色	Tien Yeng-seng	
2008	Fatal Move	奪師	Lok Tin-hung	
2008	L for Love L for Lies	我的最愛	Michael	Cameo
2008	The Mummy: Tomb of the Dragon Emperor	木乃伊3：龍的詛咒	Assassin #1	
2008	Legendary Assassin	狼牙	Bo Tong-lam	Also director
2009	Kung Fu Cyborg	機器俠	K-88	
2010	Just Another Pandora's Box	越光寶盒	Chief guard	Cameo
2010	City Under Siege	全城戒備	Sun Hao	
2010	Wind Blast	西風烈	Yang Xiaoming (Shepherd)	
2010	Love Tactics	爱情36计	Wu Jielun	Cameo
2011	Shaolin	新少林寺	JingNeng	
2011	Magic to Win	开心魔法	Bi Yewu (Fire Magician)	
2013	Badges of Fury	不二神探	Insurance manager	Cameo
2014	The Breakup Guru	分手大师	Wu Jing	Cameo
2015	Wolf Warrior	战狼	Leng Feng	Also director
2015	SPL II: A Time for Consequences	殺破狼2	Chan Chi-kit	
2016	Call of Heroes	危城	Cheung Yik	
2016	A Chinese Odyssey Part Three	大话西游3	Tang Sanzang	
2017	Wolf Warrior 2	战狼2	Leng Feng	Also director
2017	Gong Shou Dao	功守道	Master Jing	
2018	The Faces of My Gene	祖宗十九代	Mei Banfa	
2019	The Wandering Earth	流浪地球	Liu Peiqiang	
2019	The Climbers	攀登者	Fang Wuzhou	
2019	My People, My Country	我和我的祖国		
2020	The Sacrifice	金刚川	Guan Lei	
2021	The Battle at Lake Changjin	长津湖	Wu Qianli	
2021	My Country, My Parents	我和我的父辈	Ma Renxing	Also the director of Part 1: Windriders
2022	The Battle at Lake Changjin II	长津湖之水门桥	Wu Qianli	
2023	The Wandering Earth 2	流浪地球2	Liu Peiqiang	
2023	Ride On	龙马精神	Yuanjie	Cameo
2023	Meg 2: The Trench	巨齿鲨2：深渊	Jiuming	
2023	Ping Pong: The Triumph	中国乒乓之绝地反击	Da Li	
2026	Blades of the Guardians	镖人	Dao Ma	

=== Television series ===
Year	English title	Chinese title	Role	Notes/Ref.
1997	Master of Tai Chi	太极宗師	Yang Yuqian	
1998	Xin Shuihu Houzhuan	新水滸後傳	Ximen Jinge	
1998	The New Shaolin Temple	新少林寺	Jueyuan	
1999	Legend of Dagger Li	小李飛刀	A'fei	
2000	Love in the Turbulent Times	亂世桃花	Pei Yuanqing	
2000	The Bigwig	大人物	Yang Fan	
2000	Cema Xiao Xifeng	策马啸西风	Meng Xinghun	
2001	Xin Tian Can Bian	新天蚕变	Yun Feiyang	
2001	Huangshang Dubuqi	皇上对不起	Qianlong Emperor	
2001	Da Qinchai Zhi Huangcheng Shenying	大钦差皇城神鹰	Qi Yun'ao	
2002	Shaolin King of Martial Arts	少林武王	Tanzhi	
2002	Jiangshan Weizhong	江山為重	Hongli / Chen Bangguo	
2002	Southern Shaolin	南少林	Fang Shiyu	
2003	Eternity: A Chinese Ghost Story	倩女幽魂	Zhuge Liuyun	
2003	36th Chamber of Southern Shaolin	南少林三十六房	Fang Shiyu	
2004	Jiangshan Ernü Jiduo Qing	江山儿女几多情	Emperor	
2004	I Have Eyes Only for You	誰爲我心動	Bai Xiangfei	
2005	Wudang II	武当II	Zhang Wuji	
2005	Gushangzao Shi Qian	鼓上蚤时迁	Shi Qian	
2012	I'm a Special Soldier II	我是特种兵之利刃出鞘	He Chenguang / He Weidong	

== Accolades ==
Year	Award	Category	Nominated work	Ref.
2015	22nd Beijing College Student Film Festival	Best Directorial Debut	Wolf Warrior	
2015	1st Jackie Chan Action Movie Awards	Best Actor	Wolf Warrior	
2017	2nd Golden Rooster Award	Best Actor	Wolf Warrior 2	
2017	2nd Golden Rooster Award	Best Director	Wolf Warrior 2	
2017	5th China Britain Film Festival	Best Director	Wolf Warrior 2	
2017	4th Silk Road Film Festival	Outstanding Achievement Award	Wolf Warrior 2	
2017	14th Guangzhou Student Film Festival	Most Popular Director	Wolf Warrior 2	
2017	14th Guangzhou Student Film Festival	Most Popular Actor	Wolf Warrior 2	
2018	23rd Huading Awards	Best Director	Wolf Warrior 2	
2018	4th Jackie Chan Action Movie Awards	Best Director	Wolf Warrior 2	
2018	4th Jackie Chan Action Movie Awards	Best Actor	Wolf Warrior 2	
2018	34th Hundred Flowers Awards	Best Actor	Wolf Warrior 2	
2018	17th Huabiao Awards	Outstanding Actor	Wolf Warrior 2	
