= Ken Lo =

Cambodian-Hong Kong actor

- Born: Kenneth Lo Wai-Kwong; 17 March 1959 (age 67); Stung Treng, Cambodia
- Occupations: Actor; martial artist; stuntman
- Years active: 1985–present
- Spouse: Lai Sok-yin (div. 2006)
- Children: 2

Chinese name
- Traditional Chinese: 盧惠光
- Simplified Chinese: 卢惠光
Transcriptions
Standard Mandarin
- Hanyu Pinyin: Lú Huìguāng
Yue: Cantonese
- Jyutping: Lou4 Wai6-gwong1

Kenneth Lo Wai-Kwong (born 17 March 1959), professionally known as Ken Lo, is a Cambodian-Hong Kong actor, martial artist, and stuntman. He is known for his martial arts and stunt work as a former member of the Jackie Chan Stunt Team, most notably for his antagonistic role as John in Drunken Master II (1994).

== Early life ==
Ken Lo was born on 17 March 1959 as Kenneth Lo Wai-Kwong in Stung Treng, Cambodia. Lo's father is Hong Kong-Chinese and his mother is a Laotian. In 1975, at age 18, Lo and his family moved from Cambodia to Udon Thani, Thailand.

Five years later, in 1980, he went to Hong Kong and worked as a tour guide. His idol was Bruce Lee which led him to practise Muay Thai and Taekwondo in Thailand. He won the freestyle fighting championships seven times, so his chance came when he made his debut in Working Class (1985).

== Career ==
In 1986, Lo met Jackie Chan in a disco in Hong Kong, where he was head of security, and Chan hired him as his own bodyguard. Lo not only became Chan's bodyguard but also acted in many of his martial arts films. One of his best-known roles is "John", the main antagonist and right-hand man of the British ambassador in Drunken Master II (1994), in which he and Chan engaged in a protracted final fight; Lo stepped in when another stunt actor was injured. That climactic ten-minute fight sequence has become legendary and one of the most remarkably sustained examples of martial arts choreography ever filmed in Hong Kong cinema.

In 2005, Lo acted in the American action film Into the Sun (2005) with Steven Seagal, with whom he was involved in a fight scene. Lo is currently active in Hong Kong film industry.

== Personal life ==
Lo married Hong Kong actress Lai Sok-yin (黎淑賢) and they have two sons. The couple divorced in 2006. His cousin Brian Yu has performed stunts for Mark Chao movies.

In addition to his native Cantonese, he also speaks Thai, having learned when he lived in Thailand. As such, some of his film roles have lines in Thai.

== Filmography ==
- Working Class (1985) as Kickboxer
- Naughty Boys (1986) as Thug
- Legacy of Rage (1986) as Michael's Thug
- The Law Enforcer (1986)
- Project A Part II (1987) as Brains
- Royal Warriors (1987) as Insp. Rocky Lo
- Chi dan qing (1988) as Police Officer
- Hua xin ye mei gui (1988)
- The Inspector Wears Skirts (1988) as Tiger Squad Member
- Final Justice (1988) as Kong
- Police Story 2 (1988) as Fireman
- Bed Companions (1988) as Tang Sai-Kit
- Bloody Brotherhood (1989) as Wu Chi-Ko
- City Warriors (1989)
- The Inspector Wears Skirts 2 (1989)
- Miracles (1989)
- No Compromise (1989)
- Devil Hunters (1989) as Thug
- The Fortune Code (1989) as Japanese Soldier
- Island of Fire (1990)
- Lethal Parther (1990)
- Stage Door Johnny (1990)
- Crystal Hunt (1991)
- Armour of God II: Operation Condor (1991)
- The Tantana (1991)
- Cheetah on Fire (1992)
- Police Story 3: Super Cop (1992)
- Naked Killer (1992)
- Fighting Fist (1992)
- City Hunter' (1993)
- Crime Story (1993)
- Drunken Master II (1994)
- Circus Kid (1994)
- Thunderbolt (1995)
- My Father is a Hero (1995)
- Red Zone (1995)
- Police Story 4: First Strike (1996)
- Young and Dangerous 4 (1997)
- Portland Street Blues (1998)
- Rush Hour (1998) as Juntao's Man #1
- Who Am I? (1998)
- A Man Called Hero (1999)
- Gorgeous (1999)
- Gen-X-Cops (1999)
- No Problem (1999)
- China Strike Force (2000)
- 2000 AD (2000)
- Runaway (2001)
- Shark Busters (2002)
- Muscle Heat (2002)
- Dead or Alive: Final (2002)
- Star Runner (2003)
- Shanghai Knights (2003)
- Around the World in 80 Days (2004)
- New Police Story (2005)
- Dragon Reloaded (2005)
- Into the Sun (2005)
- The Myth (2005)
- Rob-B-Hood (2006)
- Fatal Contact (2006)
- Invisible Target (2007)
- The Drummer (2007)
- Whispers and Moans (2007)
- Fatal Move (2008)
- Run Papa Run (2008)
- Legendary Assassin (2008)
- Shinjuku Incident (2009)
- Little Big Soldier (2010)
- Bad Blood (2010)
- Bruce Lee, My Brother (2010)
- Life Without Principle (2011)
- Nightfall (2012) - Convict in opening fight
- The Fairy Tale Killer (2012)
- CZ12 (2012)
- Ip Man: The Final Fight (2013)
- 7 Assassins (2013)
- Special ID (2013)
- The White Storm (2013)
- The Four II (2013)
- From Vegas to Macau II (2015)
- Imprisoned: Survival Guide for Rich and Prodigal (2015)
- Who Am I 2015 (2015)
- SPL II: A Time For Consequences (2015)
- Robbery (2015)
- 10,000 Miles (2016)
- Special Female Force (2016)
- Shock Wave (2017)
- Paradox (2017)
- OCTB (2017) (TV series)
- Always Be with You (2017)
- Agent Mr Chan (2018)
- Concerto of the Bully (2018)
- Unleashed (2019)
- Raging Fire (2021)
