= Charles Heung =

Hong Kong film producer and former actor (born 1948)

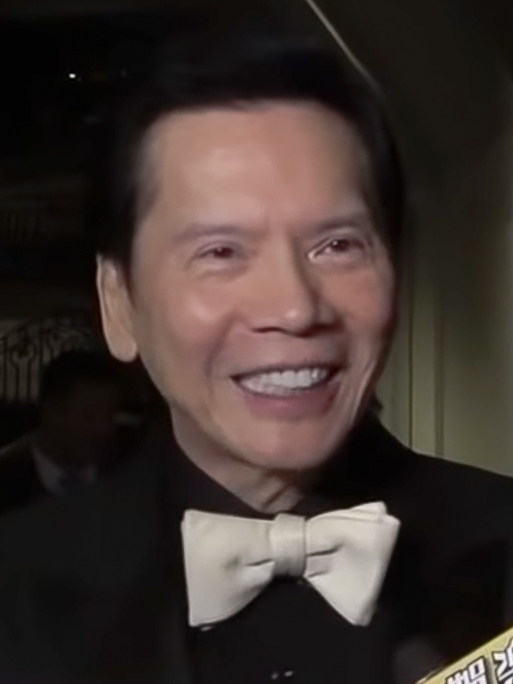
- Heung in 2018
- Born: 16 December 1948 (age 77); British Hong Kong
- Occupations: Film producer, film presenter, Chairman of China Star Entertainment Ltd.
- Spouse(s): Betty Ting (1976–1978, 1 daughter); Tiffany Chen (1980–, 2 sons)
- Children: 3
- Parent: Heung Chin (father)

Chinese name
- Traditional Chinese: 向華強
- Simplified Chinese: 向华强
Transcriptions
Standard Mandarin
- Hanyu Pinyin: Xiàng Huáqiáng
Yue: Cantonese
- Jyutping: Heung3 Wa4-keung4
- Musical career
- Also known as: Xiang Huaqiang; Heung Wa-keung

Charles Heung Wah-keung (Chinese: 向華強; born 16 December 1948) is a Hong Kong actor-turned-filmmaker. Founder of Win's Entertainment in the 1980s and China Star Entertainment Group in the 1990s, he played a prominent role in Hong Kong cinema, helping establish the careers of figures such as Stephen Chow, Chow Yun-fat, Johnnie To, Jet Li, and Andy Lau.

== Background ==
Heung's father, Heung Chin, founded the Sun Yee On Triad in 1919. Charles is the tenth of the Sun Yee On founder's thirteen children. Chin's eldest son, Heung Wah-yim, was convicted in 1988 of being the triad's leader, although his conviction in Hong Kong was overturned on a technicality. The Senate Subcommittee on Investigations also identified Wah-yim as the triad's leader in a 1992 report on Asian organized crime.

Charles is the older brother of Jimmy Heung, who became his partner at Win's Entertainment. The partnership ended in 1992 as Charles felt that Jimmy's style of negotiating business too closely resembled that of a triad member.

Charles was one of several Heung brothers identified in 1992 by the United States Senate Permanent Subcommittee of Investigations as top office-bearers in the Sun Yee On. Two years later, a former Red Pole for the Sun Yee On, testifying in a Chinatown racketeering case in a Brooklyn Federal Court, identified Charles as one of "the top guys, the biggest," in the society. A year after that, the Royal Commission for Canada sent Heung a letter rejecting his application for a Visa, citing evidence placing him squarely on the ruling council of the Sun Yee On.

Heung agrees that his family has what he calls "a Triad background," but says that he personally has little knowledge of such things, and has had to labor hard to overcome the stigma. He also admits that some people may fear him, but says his business philosophy is to get top actors and directors to make movies for him because they like him.

In 2000, when his brother Heung Wah-Po was arrested for setting fire to his own apartment after quarreling with his mistress, Charles refused to help him and publicly announced that he did not know his brothers well since they were given birth by different mothers.

== Career ==
Heung started off as an actor making films (mostly martial arts films) in Taiwan during the 1970s, before becoming a producer. While the triad's influence in Hong Kong cinema became notorious, Heung tried to keep himself away from his family's triad image by creating a company of safe refuge. In 1984, he and his brother, Jimmy Heung, formed Win's Entertainment Ltd., which, beside Golden Harvest, became one of the most successful film studios in Hong Kong. Charles was quoted for saying that, "Every film is a battle" when asked why he named the production company Win's.

Virtually every major star in Hong Kong, except for Jackie Chan, had made a film for the Heungs. Jet Li, the biggest martial-arts star in Hong Kong, began making movies exclusively for Heung after his manager was shot dead in 1993. Andy Lau joined Win's' stable of stars after one of his associates, a 26-year-old woman, was hospitalized for injuries she received when her apartment was firebombed. Hong Kong police believed that both incidents were related to triad gang activity.

Apart from being a producer, Heung is also known for his supporting roles during the 1990s, notably Lung Wu, the bodyguard in God of Gamblers and its numerous sequels and spin-offs. He appeared in The Prince of Temple Street and Casino Raiders, which was co-directed by his brother, Jimmy. In 1993, he received a Hong Kong Film Award nomination for his supporting role in Arrest the Restless.

In 1992, Heung formed China Star Entertainment Group and became its chairman and CEO, with his wife, Tiffany Chen, serving as vice-chairman and administrative producer. As a producer, Heung worked with major stars such as Jet Li, Andy Lau, Sammi Cheng, Cecilia Cheung, Simon Yam, and Lau Ching-Wan, as well as other filmmakers such as Johnnie To, Wai Ka-Fai, Wong Jing, Herman Yau and Dennis Law.

In 1999, Heung established One Hundred Years of Film Co. Ltd., a subsidiary for China Star. Following the partnership split between himself and his brother, Heung closed down the Win's Entertainment in 2000, and continued to produce and distribute films under the China Star label.

Heung and Jet Li survived the 2004 Indian Ocean earthquake and tsunami when they were on vacation in Maldives together. Jet Li subsequently established a charity, Jet Li One Foundation, in 2005. Heung became the director of Jet Li One Foundation (Hong Kong) and the Director of Beijing Normal University One Foundation Philanthropy Research Institute.

== Personal life ==
In 1976, Heung married Betty Ting Pei. They have a daughter, Candy. They divorced in 1978.

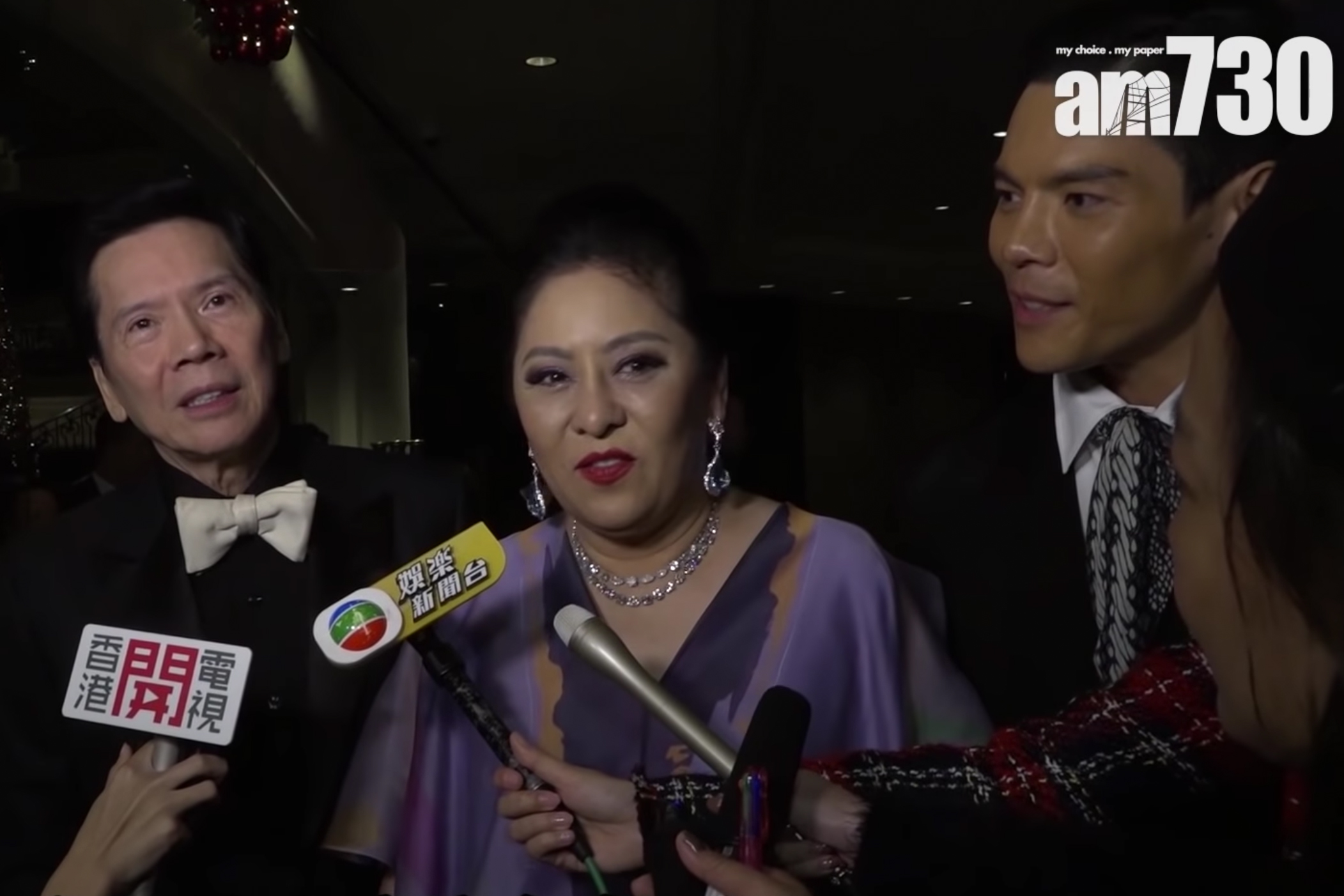
Heung with his wife Tiffany Chen and son Jacky Heung in 2018

In 1980, Heung married Tiffany Chen, who moved from her native Taiwan to Hong Kong in 1982. They have two sons, Jacky and Johnathan.

Heung publicly supported the Hong Kong National Security Law, while his wife Chen criticized protesters during the 2019-20 Hong Kong protests. Additionally, Jacky Heung was a member of the CCP's All-China Youth Federation. In December 2020, Heung and his son, Jacky, applied for dependent residency in Taiwan through Chen's Taiwanese citizenship; both were denied in February 2021 on the basis of "danger of threatening national interest, public safety, or public order or engaging in terrorist activities." Heung was also vice president of the China Film Foundation, which a Taiwanese lawmaker said has been conducting propaganda for mainland China, and thus it was correct to reject Heung's application. Heung had a criminal record in Taiwan, for which he was denied entry into Taiwan several times.
