= One Hundred Years of Film =

Hong Kong film production company

One Hundred Years of Film Co. Ltd.
- Company type: Private
- Industry: Cinema of Hong Kong
- Founded: Hong Kong (1999)
- Founder: Charles Heung
- Defunct: 2009
- Headquarters: Hong Kong
- Key people: Charles Heung; Tiffany Chen
- Products: Films
- Parent: China Star Entertainment Group

One Hundred Years of Film Co. Ltd. (Chinese: 一百年電影有限公司) was a Hong Kong film production company. It was a subsidiary for Hong Kong film distributor China Star Entertainment Group. The company was formed by Charles Heung in 1999.

== Company ==
One Hundred Years of Film was established in 1999 by film producer/presenter Charles Heung. Heung signed up top directors such as Johnnie To, Ringo Lam and Tsui Hark with his initial plan being to make 100 films within three years. The company to this day continues to make a slew of films for China Star Entertainment Group, a company Heung established in 1992.

In 2009, the company went defunct and has been folded into Win's Movie and Television Production, who had been revived the same year.

== Films ==
The company's first feature film was To and Wai Ka-Fai's 2000 film Needing You.... The company has since made over 50 feature films alongside China Star, many of which have been box office successes. This includes film such as Election and its sequel Election 2 (a.k.a. Triad Election), Love on a Diet, Running on Karma, Driving Miss Wealthy, and La Brassiere.

== Subsidiaries ==
Subsidiaries of One Hundred Years of Film include production companies such as China Star Entertainment Group, Win's Entertainment and Winson Entertainment/Star Entertainment.
