= China Star Entertainment Group =

Hong Kong film company

China Star Entertainment Limited
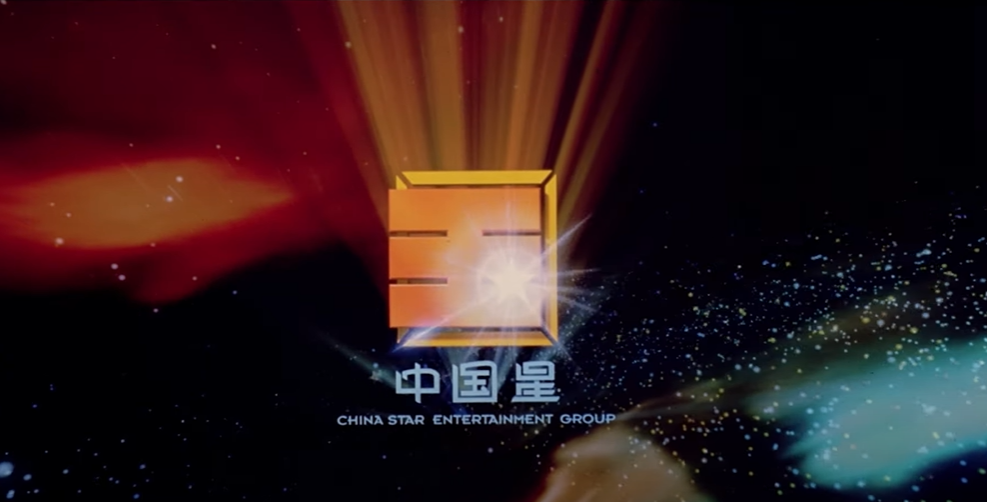
- Logo used from 2000 to 2002
- Native name: 中國星集團公司
- Type: Public Company
- Traded as: SEHK: 326
- Industry: Production company, film distributor, property development and investment, gaming
- Founded: 1992
- Founder: Charles Heung
- Headquarters: Shun Tak Centre Sheung Wan, Hong Kong, China
- Key people: Charles Heung; Tiffany Chen
- Products: Motion pictures, Television shows
- Subsidiaries: One Hundred Years of Film
- Website: irasia.com/listco/hk/chinastar

China Star Entertainment Limited (Chinese: 中國星集團公司) is a Hong Kong film production company and film distributor. It was established in 1992 by film producer Charles Heung, and is a distributor and film producer of films made mostly in Cantonese.

== Company ==
China Star Entertainment Group was established in 1992 by Charles Heung, previous one was Win's, established in 1977, who is the studio's CEO chairman, with his wife, Tiffany Chen, serving as Vice Chairman and administrative producer.

China Star Entertainment and its subsidiaries are principally engaged in the production and distribution of Cantonese-language films and television drama series. The company has also engaged in the provision of artists' management services and post-production services.

In the past few years, China Star has re-organized itself as an entertainment, multimedia, production, distribution, property development, property investment and gaming operations. enterprise.

== Films ==
China Star's film catalogue spans over ten years, and it has produced various films. Some films include Cannes competition flick Election and its sequel, Election 2 (a.k.a. Triad Election), fantasy actioner Black Mask, the chiller My Left Eye Sees Ghosts and Chinese New Year special Fat Choi Spirit. These and other movie titles, a majority of which were produced during the past ten years, feature some Hong Kong actors, including Jet Li, Andy Lau, Simon Yam, Sammi Cheng, Gigi Leung, Lau Ching-Wan, Louis Koo, Cherrie Ying and Cecilia Cheung.

In 2001, the four most popular and successful films produced by China Star, namely Wu yen, Love on a Diet, La Brassiere and Master Q 2001, achieved a total box office receipt of approximately HK$107, million, representing 38% of total box office receipts for the top ten Chinese films in Hong Kong. In 2002, My Left Eye Sees Ghosts, The Lion Roars, Mighty Baby and Fat Choi Spirit achieved a total box office receipt of approximately HK$73 million, making them four of the most successful local Chinese films of that year. In 2004, Fantasia, a Chinese New Year comedy film, was recorded as the second highest box-office take of all local films in 2004.

In 2005, the film industry experienced lower revenue in the midst of the economic downturn and an influx of illegally copied films in VCD and DVD format. The total number of Chinese dialect films substantially decreased. China Star produced a total of 11 films, accounting for 18% of the 61 Hong Kong films produced in the year. Many of China Star's film have been successful on an international scale. Johnnie To and Wai Ka-Fai's Milkyway Image films, such Election, Election 2 and Mad Detective enjoyed Hong Kong box office successes and were sold to a slew of foreign territories (including United States, France and Argentina). China Star has gone on to produce a limited number of films after producing Poker King in 2009. In 2014, League of Gods is considered a comeback project for China Star, a 3D film, with a budget of 300 million Hong Kong dollars, that will star Jet Li, Louis Koo, Huang Xiaming, Angelababy, Jacky Heung etc.

== Real estate ventures ==
In June 2017, China Star sold its hotel holding in Macau to casino company Paradise Entertainment for HK$2.38 billion. The company stock price went up 62% in morning trading of the day after the news was published. China Star said it planned to use part of the sales proceed to develop "a two-tower luxury residential and commercial complex" on land it owns next to the hotel, where construction worked started last month.

At the close of 2017, China Star had a commercial property in Mercer Street, Hong Kong for long-term investment. In addition, the company had two developing projects in Macau due to complete in 2019 and 2023.

Around 2012, China Star started planning and building Tiffany House residential project near Golden Lotus Square, in Sé, Macau, China. Construction began in 2017. The pre-sales of units began in June 2022.

== Subsidiaries ==
Subsidiaries of China Star Entertainment Group include production companies such as One Hundred Years of Film, Win's Entertainment and Winson Entertainment/Star Entertainment.

== See also ==
List of films: China Star Entertainment Group films
