= List of Hong Kong films of 2009 =

A list of films produced in Hong Kong in 2009:.

== Box office ==
The highest-grossing Hong Kong films released in 2009 by domestic box office gross revenue, are as follows:

Highest-grossing films released in 2009
Rank	Title	Domestic gross
1	All's Well, Ends Well 2009	HK$24,655,932
2	Red Cliff II	HK$23,713,573
3	Bodyguards and Assassins	HK$16,627,298
4	Turning Point	HK$15,662,535
5	Overheard	HK$15,452,595
6	The Storm Warriors	HK$15,448,189
7	Shinjuku Incident	HK$13,913,420
8	Look for a Star	HK$12,613,830
9	Murderer	HK$11,697,556
10	On His Majesty's Secret Service	HK$8,799,679

== January–March ==
Opening		Title	Studio	Cast and crew	Genre
J a n u a r y	1	Lady Cop & Papa Crook	Media Asia Films / China Film Media Asia / Beijing Silver Moon / Pop Movies	Alan Mak (director); Felix Chong Sammi Cheng, Eason Chan, Richie Ren	Comedy film / crime thriller
J a n u a r y	8	Tactical Unit - Comrades in Arms	Universe Entertainment / Milkyway Image	Law Wing-Cheong (director); Simon Yam, Maggie Siu, Lam Suet	Action thriller
J a n u a r y	22	All's Well, Ends Well 2009	Mandarin Films Distribution Co. Ltd./ Enlight Pictures	Vincent Kok (director); Raymond Wong, Sandra Ng, Louis Koo, Ronald Cheng	Comedy
J a n u a r y	26	Look for a Star	Media Asia Films / Huayi Brothers / Basic Pictures / China Film Co-Production Corporation	Andrew Lau (director); Andy Lau, Shu Qi, Denise Ho, George Lam, Ella Koon, Maria Cordero, Raymond Cho, Cheung Tat Ming, David Chiang, Dominic Lam, Zhang Hanyu	Romance
F e b r u a r y	12	Claustrophobia	Irresistible Films	Ivy Ho (director); Ekin Cheng, Karena Lam, Andy Hui, Felix Lok, Eric Tsang, Derek Tsang	Romance
F e b r u a r y	14	Give Love	BIG Pictures	Lee Ka-Wing, Joe Ma (director); Gigi Leung, Wilson Chen, Shao Bing, Shaun Tam, Fan Siu-Wong	Romantic comedy
F e b r u a r y	16	Love Connected		Patrick Kong (director); Stephy Tang, Kay Tse, Justin Lo, Chelsea Tong, Terry Wu, Miki Yueng, G.E.M, I Love You Boyz	Romance
F e b r u a r y	19	Kung Fu Chefs	Brilliant Emperor Production Ltd	Yip Wing-Kin (director); Sammo Hung, Vanness Wu, Timmy Hung, Cherrie Ying, Lam Tze Chung, Louis Fan, Bruce Leung, Ai Kago	Action comedy
F e b r u a r y	26	Basic Love	Universe Entertainment	Oxide Pang (director); Elanne Kwong, Janice Man, Rex Ho, Xu Zheng Xi, James Ho, Brian Li, Yumi Yin	Romance
M a r c h	5	The Forbidden Legend: Sex & Chopsticks II		Chin Man Kei (director); Hikaru Wakana, Serina Hayakawa, Kaera Uehara, Winnie Leung, Lam Wai Kin, Ng Chi Hung, Sammuel Leung, Chung Tam Kon, Lee Kin-Yan	Erotic comedy
M a r c h	19	A Very Short Life	Point of View Movie Production Co. Ltd. / One Hundred Years of Film	Dennis Law (director); Leila Tong, Maggie Siu, Eddie Cheung, Benz Hui, HotCha, Snow Suen, Pinky Cheung, Shermon Tang, Koni Lui, Yoyo Law, Samuel Pang	Crime

== April–June ==
Opening		Title	Studio	Cast and crew	Genre
A p r i l	2	Shinjuku Incident		Derek Yee (director); Jackie Chan, Daniel Wu, Fan Bingbing, Chin Ka Lok, Masaya Kato, Xu Jinglei, Naoto Takenaka, Lam Suet, Ken Lo	Crime thriller
A p r i l	2	Team of Miracle: We Will Rock You		Adrian Kwan (director); Gigi Lai, Eric Suen, Benz Hui, Zhang Jin, Lam Ka Wah	Comedy
A p r i l	9	The Sniper	Media Asia Films / Blue Fiction	Dante Lam (director); Richie Ren, Edison Chen, Huang Xiaoming	Crime thriller
A p r i l	23	Permanent Residence	ArtWalker Productions	Scud (director); Sean Li, Jackie Chow, Osman Hung, Lau Yu Hong	Drama
A p r i l	30	I Corrupt All Cops	Mega-Vision Pictures (MVP) / Sil-Metropole Organisation / Beijing Poly-bona Film Publishing Company	Wong Jing (director); Eason Chan, Anthony Wong Chau Sang, Tony Leung Ka-Fai, Natalie Meng Yao, Bowie Lam, Alex Fong, Kate Tsui	Crime thriller
M a y	1	Coweb	Beijing Channel Pictures Company; Joy Charm Entertainment; Singing Horse Productions	Xiong Xin Xin (director); Jiang Lui Xia, Sam Lee, Eddie Cheung, Kane Kosugi, Mike Möller	Martial arts
M a y	14	Night and Fog		Ann Hui (director); Simon Yam, Jingchu Zhang, Amy Chum, Law Wai Keung	Drama
M a y	21	The First 7th Night	Phaedra Pictures	Herman Yau (director); Gordon Lam, Julian Cheung, Michelle Ye, Eddie Cheung, Fung Hak-On, Tony Ho Wah-Chiu, Chan Keung, Xiao Hei, Nahatai Lekbumrung	Horror
J u n e h	25	Short of Love	BIG Pictures / Hong Kong Star X Media / Local Production	James Yuen (director); Wong Cho-Lam, Kate Tsui, Angelababy, Race Wong, JJ Jia	Romantic comedy

== July–September ==
Opening		Title	Studio	Cast and crew	Genre
J u l y	10	Written By	Creative Formula Ltd	Wai Ka-Fai (director); Lau Ching-Wan, Kelly Lin	Drama
J u l y	16	KJ : Music and Life		Cheung King-wai (director); Wong Ka-Jeng	Documentary
J u l y	16	Murderer	Sil-Metropole Organisation	Roy Chow (director); Aaron Kwok, Eddie Cheung, Josie Ho	Crime thriller
J u l y	24	McDull, Kung Fu Kindergarten	Bliss Pictures Ltd	Brian Tse (director); Sandra Ng, Jim Chim, Anthony Wong, Wan Kwong	Animation
J u l y	30	Tracing Shadow	Huayi Brothers	Marco Mak, Francis Ng (director); Jaycee Chan, Francis Ng	Martial arts comedy film
J u l y	30	Overheard	Sil-Metropole Organisation / Pop Movies	Alan Mak, Felix Chong (director); Lau Ching-Wan, Louis Koo, Daniel Wu, Zhang Jingchu, Michael Wong, Waise Lee, Stephen Au, Sharon Luk, Queenie Chu, Henry Fong, Lok Ying Kwan, Lam Kar Wah, William Chan, Alex Fong	Crime thriller
A u g u s t	6	On His Majesty's Secret Service	Mega-Vision Pictures / China Film Group Corporation /cholar Films / Beijing Ciwen Digital Oriental Film & TV Production / Beijing Hualu Baina Film & TV Production / Beijing Joy Pictures	Wong Jing (director); Louis Koo, Barbie Shu, Sandra Ng, Liu Yi Wei, Tong Da Wei, Song Jia, Yuen King Tan, Fan Siu Wong, Lam Chi Chung, Leung Ka Yan, Liu Yang, Lee Kin Yan	Romantic comedy
A u g u s t	13	Turning Point	Shaw Brothers Studio / Television Broadcasts Limited	Herman Yau (director); Michael Tse, Anthony Wong Chau Sang, Francis Ng, Felix Wong, Wayne Lai, Fala Chen, Eric Tsang	Crime thriller
A u g u s t	20	Kung Fu Cyborg	Shanghai Film Group Corporation	Jeffrey Lau (director); Hu Jun, Ronald Cheng, Wu Jing, Eric Tsang, Betty Sun, Alex Fong	Crime thriller
A u g u s t	20	Vengeance	Bliss Pictures Ltd	Johnnie To (director); Johnny Hallyday, Sylvie Testud, Simon Yam, Anthony Wong Chau Sang	Crime thriller
A u g u s t	27	Happily Ever After	Huayi Brothers	Azrael Chung, Ivy Kong (director); Ken Hung, Michelle Wai, Carlos Chan, Benz Hui	Romance
S e p t e m b e r	3	The Unbelievable	BIG Pictures / Hong Kong Star X Media / Local Production	Fazheng Situ, Xiaohua Chen (director); Wong Cho-Lam, Kate Tsui, Angelababy, Race Wong, JJ Jia	Horror documentary
S e p t e m b e r	3	Trick or Cheat	Shaw Brothers Studio / Television Broadcasts Limited	Wong Pak-kei, Yongtai Liu, Zhuoxian Chen, Huiyi Chen, Guanhuan He, Oxide Pang (director); Gloria Tang, William Chan, Terence Chui, Renee Lee, James Ho, Terence Chi	Romantic comedy
S e p t e m b e r	17	Accident	Media Asia Films / Milkyway Image	Soi Cheang (director); Louis Koo, Richie Ren, Michelle Ye	Action thriller
S e p t e m b e r	24	Glamorous Youth		Ziguang Weng (director); Jiaxuan Weng, Leung Wing-Chung, Hui So-ying, Turbo	Romance

== October–December ==
Opening		Title	Studio	Cast and crew	Genre
O c t o b e r	10	Split Second Murders		Herman Yau (director); Kay Tse, Vincy Chan, Baihao Zhou, Yung Cheng, Terence Chi, Fan Siu-Wong, Maggie Siu, Weiting Chen, Gin Oy, Andy Hui	Comedy
O c t o b e r	16	Rebellion	Local Production / Universe Entertainment	Herman Yau (director); Shawn Yue, Elanne Kwong, Chapman To, Ada Choi, Convoy Chan, Renee Dai, Ella Koon, Anson Leung, Paul Wong, Parkman Wong, Tommy Yuen, Jun Kung, Austin Wai	Crime thriller
O c t o b e r	30	Poker King	Icon Pictures / Sun City Group	Chan Hing-Ka / Janet Chun (director); Lau Ching-Wan, Louis Koo	Thriller
N o v e m b e r	5	At the End of Daybreak	Mega-Vision Pictures / Ching Joy Pictures	Ho Yu Hang (director); Kara Hui, Tsui Tin Yau, Ng Meng Hui	Romance
N o v e m b e r	5	Seven 2 One	Universe Entertainment	Danny Pang(director); Elanne Kwong, Pakho Chow, William Chan, Stephanie Cheng, SiuFay, James Ho, Gary Chiu, Chrissie Chau, Izz Tsu	Crime thriller
N o v e m b e r	19	To Live and Die in Mongkok	Mega-Vision Pictures	Wong Jing, Billy Chung (director); Nick Cheung, Paw Hee-Ching, Liu Kai-Chi, Chan Lai-wun, Monica Mok, Natalie Meng, Juno Leung, Patrick Tam	Crime thriller
D e c e m b e r	3	Jump	Columbia Pictures Film Production Asia Limited / The Star Oversea Ltd. / China Film Group Corporation / Beijing Film Studio / J.A. Media	Stephen Fung (director); Kitty Zhang, Leon Jay Williams, Daniel Wu	Horror comedy
D e c e m b e r	10	The Storm Warriors	Universe Entertainment / Sil-Metropole Organisation /Chengtian Entertainment	Pang Brothers (director); Ekin Cheng, Aaron Kwok, Nicholas Tse	Martial arts
D e c e m b e r	18	Bodyguards and Assassins	We Pictures / Cinema Popular / Polybona Films	Teddy Chan (director); Donnie Yen, Leon Lai, Nicholas Tse, Hu Jun, Simon Yam, Eric Tsang	Martial arts

== Unknown release date ==
Title	Director	Cast	Genre	Notes
Homecoming/Little Did She Know/That's Why You Go Away	Kwok Zune; Risky Liu; Nose Chan	Meg Chan, Scotty Chan, Guthrie Yip	Drama	Entered into the 2010 Hong Kong International Film Festival
