= Pakho Chau discography =

- Studio albums: 2
- Extended plays: 9
- Live albums: 2
- Compilation albums: 2
- Singles: 10

This is the discography documenting albums and singles released by Cantopop singer Pakho Chau.

== Studio albums ==
#	Album Info	Track listing
1st	8: Released：30 August 2013; Label: Warner Music Hong Kong	Track listing: 1. 雙.對 High Heels; 2. 我的宣言 My Vow; 3. 放過自己 Let Go; 4. 摔角 In The Ring; 5. 雙人床的空位 Alone in Bed; 6. 00:08:00; 7. 妳還怕大雨嗎 Don't Be Afraid（Mandarin）; 8. 摔角 In The Ring （Big Shot Version）; DVD: 1. 雙.對 High Heels; 2. 我的宣言 My Vow; 3. 摔角 In The Ring; 4. 妳還怕大雨嗎 Don't Be Afraid（Mandarin）
2nd	Keep Going: Released：16 September 2014; Label: Warner Music Hong Kong	Track listing: 1. 自由意志 Keep Going; 2. 莫失莫忘 Don't Forget; 3. Colors（Instrumental）; 4. 還記得 Still Remember; 5. 歹角 Villain; 6. 阿鈍 Dumb; 7. 現在已夜深 It's Late Now; 8. Jupiter（Instrumental）; 9. 關於我們 About Us; 10. 日落日出 A.M./P.M.（ft.Shiga Lin）; 11. 簡約 Simple; 12. 你是我的未來 You Are My Future(Mandarin)

== Extended plays ==
#	EP information	Track listing
1st	Beginning: Released: 7 November 2007; Label: Warner Music Hong Kong; Length: 17:54	1. 同天空; 2. 哦 3. 想太多; 4. 六天; 5. 同天空（Different Color Mix）
2nd	Continue: Released:21 August 2008; Label: Warner Music Hong Kong; Length: 19:11	CD: 1. 一事無成（ft.Stephanie Cheng）; 2. 最後的三分十六; 3. Humming; 4. 宏願; 5. 傻小子; 6. 一拖再拖; DVD: 1. 一事無成 MV; 2. 最後的三分十六 MV; 3. 宏願 MV; 4. 傻小子 MV
3rd	Remembrance: Released:20 August 2010; Label: Warner Music Hong Kong	CD: 1. 傑出青年; 2. 最好不過; 3. 乞丐王子; 4. 走狗; 5. 我不要被你記住; DVD: 1. 最好不過 MV; 2. 乞丐王子 MV; 3. 我不要被你記住 MV
4th	Splitting: Released: 23 June 2011; Label: Warner Music Hong Kong	CD: 1. 黑 Black; 2. 同林; 3. Smiley Face; 4. 今天應該很快樂 Should Be Happy; 5. 後援 Backup; 6. Daylight（Hidden Track）; DVD: 1. 黑 Black MV; 2. Smiley Face MV; 3. 後援 Backup MV; MOOV Live 2011 DVD: 1. 黑 2. 最後的 3分16; 3. 同天空; 4. 同林; 5. 傻小子; 6. 想太多; 7. 陳某; 8. 今天應該很快樂; 9. 走狗; 10. Smiley Face; 11. 後援
5th	Get Well Soon: Released: 12 January 2012 (CD); Released: 23 February 2012 (CD+DVD/Limited Edition); Label: Warner Music Hong Kong	CD: 1. 天光 Daylight; 2. 起跳 Take Off; 3. 金 Gold; 4. 拿愛情給我 Give Me Love; 5. 只有一事不成全你 One Thing Cannot Satisfy You; 6. 錯配 Wrong Match（Mandarin）; CD+DVD: 1. 天光 Daylight MV; 2. 起跳 Take Off MV; 3. 只有一事不成全你 One Thing Cannot Satisfy You MV
6th	Together: Released: 25 March 2014; Label: Warner Music Hong Kong	CD: 1. 異能 Alpha; 2. 着地 Landing; 3. 同行 Together; 4. 傳聞 Rumors; 5. 小孩 Child; 6. 天窗 (ft.Joey Yung)
7th	WHITE: Released: 24 April 2015 (Standard); Released: 29 April 2015 (Limited Edition); Label: Warner Music Hong Kong	CD: 1. 前言 Foreword; 2. 小白 Little White; 3. 上次講到 Where We Left Off; 4. 百年不合 A Hundred Years; 5. 我不動 I Won't Move; 6. 天不怕地不怕 Fearless; 7. 犯同樣的錯 Same Mistake（Mandarin）
8th	Roundabout: Released: 27 November 2015; Label: Warner Music Hong Kong	CD: 1. 相安無事 We'll Be Fine; 2. 天下大亂 Chaos; 3. 露齒 Say Cheers; 4. 磨牙 Molar; 5. 鞦韆 Swing（Mandarin）; 6. 等不到 Can't Wait; 7. Now I Know
9th	One Step Closer: Released: 7 April 2017; Labels: Warner Music Hong Kong HMV Digital China Group Limited	CD: 1. 囂 Arrogant; 2. How Do I Look (feat. Shimica Castro Wong); 3. 有生一天 One Day; 4. 近在千里 So Far Yet So Close (feat. Janice Vidal); 5. 終於我們 One Step Closer (feat. Yoyo Sham); 6. Touchscreen; 7. 怒花 Nova

== Digital release ==
=== Live extended plays ===
#	Album Info	Track listing
1st	iTunes Session: Released：2 September 2014; Label: Warner Music Hong Kong	Track listing: 1. 現在已夜深 It's Late Now; 2. 天窗; 3. 到此為止 The End; 4. Lovin' You; 5. 我的宣言 My Vow
2nd	iTunes Session Part 2: Released：16 December 2014; Label: Warner Music Hong Kong	Track listing: 1. 最好不過 Best Though; 2. 謝謝你離開 Thanks for Leaving; 3. 只有一事不成全你 Only One Thing Cannot Satisfy You

== Live albums ==
#	Album Info	Track listing
1st	Imperfect Live 2013 Collection: Released：23 April 2013; Label: Warner Music Hong Kong	DVD Disc 1: 1. Opening+黑; 2. 斬立決; 3. 報告總司令; 4. 同天空; 5. 六天; 6. 夠鐘; 7. Smiley Face; 8. 宏願; 9. Intermission Video + Piano; 10. 最後的三分十六; 11. 乞丐王子; 12. 今天應該很快樂; 13. 金; Disc 2: 1. 一事無成（ft.Shiga Lin）; 2. 到此為止 （ft.Shiga Lin）; 3. 同林; 4. 命案; 5. 傻小子; 6. 櫻花樹下（ft.Hins Cheung）; 7. 天光; 8. 最好不過; 9. 只有一事不成全你（ft. Jons）; 10. 無力挽回; 11. Imperfect; Encore: 1. 起跳; 2. 陳某; 3. 後援; 4. Imperfect Live (Making of); CD Disc 1: 1. Opening+黑; 2. 斬立決; 3. 報告總司令; 4. 同天空; 5. 六天; 6. 夠鐘; 7. Smiley Face; 8. 宏願; 9. Intermission Video + Piano; 10. 最後的三分十六; 11. 乞丐王子; 12. 今天應該很快樂; 13. 金; Disc 2: 1. 一事無成（ft.Shiga Lin）; 2. 到此為止 （ft.Shiga Lin）; 3. 同林; 4. 命案; 5. 傻小子; 6. 櫻花樹下（ft.Hins Cheung）; 7. 天光; 8. 最好不過; 9. 只有一事不成全你（ft. Jons）; 10. 無力挽回; 11. Imperfect; Encore: 1. 起跳; 2. 陳某; 3. 後援
2nd	Colors of Life Concert 2014: Released：29 January 2015; Label: Warner Music Hong Kong	DVD 1: 1. Prologue; 2. 異能; 3. 摔角; 4. 歹角; 5. 報告總司令; 6. Imperfect; 7. 後援; 8. 天光（with Extended Outro）; 9. 00:07:00（Interlude）; 10. 00:08:00; 11. 黑 12. Medley：現在已夜深 / 六天 / Smiley Face; 13. 我的宣言; 14. 我不要被你記住; 15. 傳聞; 16. 無力挽回; 17. 宏願; DVD 2: 1. Overture; 2. 今天應該很快樂; 3. 只有一事不成全你; 4. 同行; 5. 金 6. 起跳; 7. 同天空; 8. Keep Going Overture; 9. 自由意志; 10. 夠鐘; 11. 一事無成（feat. Celine）; 12. 到此為止; 13. 傻小子; 14. 最好不過; 15. （Bonus Track）天窗（ft.Joey Yung）; 16. （Bonus Track）滾（ft.Miriam Yeung）; 17. （Bonus）Colors of Life – Making Of; CD 1: 1. 異能; 2. 摔角; 3. 歹角; 4. Imperfect; 5. 後援; 6. 天光; 7. 00:08:00; 8. 黑 9. Medley：現在已夜深 / 六天 / Smiley Face; 10. 我的宣言; 11. 我不要被你記住; 12. 傳聞; 13. 無力挽回; 14. 宏願; CD 2: 1. Overture; 2. 今天應該很快樂; 3. 只有一事不成全你; 4. 同行; 5. 金 6. 起跳; 7. 同天空; 8. Keep Going Overture; 9. 自由意志; 10. 夠鐘; 11. 一事無成（feat. Celine）; 12. 到此為止; 13. 傻小子; 14. 最好不過; 15. （Bonus Track）天窗（ft.Joey Yung）; 16. （Bonus Track）滾（ft.Miriam Yeung）

== Compilation albums ==
=== Live extended plays ===
#	Album Info	Track listing
1st	Follow (New Songs + Selections): Released：13 July 2009; Label: Warner Music Hong Kong	DVD CD: 1. Lovin' You（New）; 2. 報告總司令（New）; 3. 陳某（New）; 4. 夠鐘（New）; 5. 同天空; 6. 宏願; 7. 想太多; 8. 一事無成; 9. 最後的三分十六; 10. 六天; 11. 傻小子; 12. 一拖再拖; 13. 哦; DVD: 1. Lovin' You（New）; 2. 報告總司令（New）; 3. 陳某（New）; 4. 夠鐘（New）
1st	Imperfect Collection (New Songs + Selections): Released：18 December 2012; Released :28 December 2012 (Special Edition); Label: Warner Music Hong Kong	DVD Disc 1: 1. Imperfect（New）; 2. 無力挽回 Irreversible（New）; 3. 我不要被你記住; 4. 錯配 (Mandarin); 5. 最後的三分十六; 6. 黑 7. 天光; 8. 同天空; 9. 陳某; 10. 想太多; 11. 傻小子; 12. 同林; 13. 只有一事不成全你; Disc 2: 1. 斬立決 Death Row（New）; 2. Smiley Face; 3. 六天; 4. 宏願; 5. 今天應該很快樂; 6. 拿愛情給我; 7. 夠鐘; 8. 一事無成（ft.Stephanie Cheng）; 9. 報告總司令; 10. 後援; 11. 乞丐王子; 12. 金 13. 最好不過; 14. 無力挽回 (Imperfect Mix)（iTunes Version）

== Singles ==
=== As lead artist ===
List of singles, with selected chart positions and certifications
Title	Year	Peak chart positions									Certifications	Album
Title	Year	903 Top 20	RTHK	Metro Radio	TVB	Metro Children's Song	DBC Chinese Pop Chart	RTHK Mandarin	HMV PLAY	CANADIAN CHINESE POP MUSIC	Certifications	Album
"同天空"	2007	2	3	4	—	—	—	—	—	—		Beginning EP
"六天"	2007	2	7	7	3	—	—	—	—	—		Beginning EP
"哦"	2007	—	—	—	—	—	—	—	—	—		Beginning EP
"想太多"	2007	—	—	—	—	—	—	—	—	—		Beginning EP
"傻小子"	2008	20	—	—	—	—	—	—	—	—		Continue EP
"一事無成"	2008	2	1	3	2	—	—	—	—	—		Continue EP
"宏願"	2008	2	11	2	1	—	—	—	—	—		Continue EP
"最後的三分十六"	2008	—	12	—	1	—	—	—	—	—		Continue EP
"報告總司令"	2009	1	3	5	8	—	—	—	—	—		Follow
"Lovin' You"	2009	3	6	3	4	—	—	—	—	—		Follow
"陳某"	2009	—	—	—	—	—	—	—	—	—		Follow
"夠鐘"	2009	—	—	—	—	—	—	—	—	—		Follow
"我不要被你記住"	2010	5	3	1	^	—	—	—	—	—		Remembrance EP
"乞丐王子"	2010	1	3	3	^	—	—	—	—	—		Remembrance EP
"最好不過"	2010	20	2	4	^	—	—	—	—	—		Remembrance EP
"傑出青年"	2010	—	—	—	^	—	—	—	—	—		Remembrance EP
"後援"	2011	1	1	2	^	—	—	—	—	—		Splitting EP
"Smiley Face"	2011	1	1	1	^	—	—	—	—	—		Splitting EP
"黑"	2011	2	10	2	^	—	—	—	—	—		Splitting EP
"天光"	2011	5	8	3	^	—	—	—	—	—		Get Well Soon EP
"只有一事不成全你"	2011	3	3	1	^	—	—	—	—	—		Get Well Soon EP
"金"	2012	13	12	5	^	—	—	—	—	—		Get Well Soon EP
"斬立決"	2012	1	3	1	^	—	—	—	—	—		Imperfect Collection
"無力挽回"	2012	1	1	12	^	—	—	—	—	—		Imperfect Collection
"Imperfect"	2013	1	1	2	^	—	—	—	—	—		Imperfect Collection
"我的宣言"	2013	1	1	1	^	—	—	—	—	—		8
"摔角"	2013	7	5	3	^	—	—	—	—	—		8
"00:08:00 (Radio Cut)"	2013	—	—	—	^	—	—	—	—	—		8
"天窗"	2013	14	—	3	^	—	—	—	—	—		Together EP
"異能"	2013	4	1	3	^	—	—	—	—	—		Together EP
"同行"	2014	1	1	1	1	—	—	—	—	—		Together EP
"傳聞"	2014	2	1	2	4	—	—	—	—	—		Together EP
"小孩"	2014	13	—	—	—	—	—	—	—	—		Together EP
"現在已夜深"	2014	9	4	2	4	—	—	—	—	—		Keep Going
"自由意志"	2014	1	1	3	3	1	—	—	—	—		Keep Going
"還記得"	2014	19	11	1	—	—	—	—	—	—		Keep Going
"日落日出（Christmas Morning Remix）"	2014	17	—	4	—	—	—	—	—	—		Keep Going
"小白"	2014	2	1	1	3	1	—	—	—	—		WHITE EP
"百年不合"	2015	1	1	1	1	—	—	—	—	—		WHITE EP
"天不怕地不怕"	2015	2	—	—	—	—	—	—	—	—		WHITE EP
"上次講到"	2015	19	—	12	—	—	—	—	—	—		WHITE EP
"相安無事"	2015	2	1	1	1	—	—	—	—	—		Roundabout EP
"Now I Know"	2015	—	—	—	—	—	—	—	—	—		Roundabout EP
"天下大亂"	2015	1	7	—	—	—	14	—	—	—		Roundabout EP
"等不到"	2015	—	1	—	—	—	—	2	—	—		Roundabout EP
"磨牙"	2015	—	1	—	—	—	8	—	—	—		Roundabout EP
"不可能"	2016	—	—	—	—	—	18	—	—	—		Theme Song of "My Wife Is A Superstar"
"原力"	2016	—	2	—	—	—	—	—	—	—		Non-album single
"有生一天"	2017	3	3	—	—	—	—	—	—	—		One Step Closer EP
"終於我們"	2017	2	1	1	—	—	—	—	—	—		One Step Closer EP
"近在千里"	2017	1	—	—	—	—	—	—	1	—		One Step Closer EP
"香港 • 我家"	2017	—	3	—	—	—	—	—	—	—		Non-album single
"請你愛我"	2017	13	14	—	—	—	—	—	—	—		77 Heartbreaks
"天網"	2017	—	1	1	1	—	—	—	14	3		Line Walker: The Prelude
"男人背後"	2018	3	3	—	—	—	—	—	—	—		TBA
"—" denotes releases that did not chart or were not sent to those music stations. "^" denotes releases that having copyright tax disputes with TVB

Total No.1 Hits
903	RTHK	997	TVB	Note
13	18	12	5	The Total Number of Four No.1 Hit songs：2

=== Soundtrack appearance ===
Title	Year	Film	Note
傻小子	2008	Love Is Elsewhere	
數碼超能量	2009	Digimon Savers Cartoon Theme Song	
販賣。愛	2014	I Sell Love	
百年不合	2015	A Time of Love II	
不可能	2016	My Wife Is Superstar	
請你愛我	2017	77 Heartbreaks	
天網	2017	Line Walker: The Prelude	
上下線	2017	One Step Closer Microfilm	
月光濃湯	2017	One Step Closer Microfilm	
愛是彩色的	2017	One Step Closer Microfilm	
