= Paris Holiday =

Paris Holiday may refer to:

- Paris Holiday (1958 film), an American comedy film
- Paris Holiday (2015 film), a Chinese-Hong Kong romantic comedy film
