= Mr. Nian =

- Poster
- Chinese: 年兽大作战
- Directed by: Zhang Yang
- Production companies: Dongyang Huaihouzi Entertainment; Xizang Yige Wanxiang Entertainment; Beijing Huagai Yingyue Entertainment; Heyi Pictures; Tianjin Maoyan Media; Beijing MaxTimes Culture Development; Beijing Motianlun Media
- Distributed by: Tianjin Maoyan Media
- Release date: February 8, 2016
- Running time: 97 minutes
- Country: China
- Language: Mandarin
- Box office: CN¥34.5 million (China)

Mr. Nian (Chinese: 年兽大作战), also known as Crazy Nian, is a 2016 Chinese animated fantasy comedy film directed by Zhang Yang. It was released on February 8, 2016, in China by Tianjin Maoyan Media.

== Cast ==
- Lei Jiayin
- Zhou Dongyu
- Chen He
- Tao Hong
- Guo Tao
- Patrick Guo
- Liu Yiwei
- Shen Teng
- Zhang Yibai
- Wang Xun
- Hao Yun
- Xie Na
- Xiong Naijin

== Reception ==
The film grossed CN¥34.5 million in China.
