= Battle of the Buskers =

- Presented by: Lee Teng; Jeff Goh; Karyn Wong; Zhu Zeliang (guest); Lin Pin Juan (guest)
- Judges: Hong Junyang (semifinal); Peter Li (semifinal); Ling Kai (semifinal); Pakho Chau (final); Kay Huang (final); Jim Lim (final)
- No. of contestants: 16
- Winner: The ETC 闲杂人等
- Runners-up: Evan Goh 吴宇凡; T Junction 红绿灯
- Location: Mediacorp Campus; Hougang Central Hub (Busking round); Paya Lebar Quarter (Busking round); Waterway Point (Busking round); Westgate, Singapore (Busking round); Plaza Singapura (Top 10 showcases/Quarterfinal); Bugis+ (Quarterfinal); Cathay Cineleisure Orchard (Quarterfinal); Funan (Quarterfinal); Wisma Atria (Quarterfinal); ION Orchard (Semifinal); CQ @ Clarke Quay Fountain Square (Final)
- No. of episodes: 10 (meWATCH and YouTube); 9 (Channel 8)

Release
- Original network: meWATCH; YouTube; Channel 8 (finals)
- Original release: July 23 – November 5, 2023

Battle of the Buskers (Chinese: 游走的歌王) is a singing reality competition organized by Mediacorp Channel 8. The season premiered on its Mediacorp streaming website meWATCH and its YouTube channel on 23 July 2023, and the finals were held on 5 November 2023. The competition were held across 11 locations islandwide beginning at Hougang Central Hub and ending with CQ @ Clarke Quay Fountain Square.

Musicians The ETC 闲杂人等, which consist of 46-year old Tristan Ong and 47-year old Joey Wee, were the winners of Battle of the Buskers; 35-year old busker Evan Goh and friends T Junction 红绿灯, which consist of 30-year old Alina Mak and 28-year old Lim Jia Rui, finished as co-runners-up.

== Development ==
First teased during the Star Awards 2023 show, the competition was announced on 8 May 2023 and auditions are opened on that date until May 26. Buskers with a valid identification issued by the National Arts Council of Singapore are eligible to take part. Acts can either be a solo act or as a group, and has no age limits. According to the producers and again in the final broadcast, 27 buskers have been selected for the final rounds of audition before narrowing it down to 16.

== Contestants ==
A list of 16 busking acts were announced on 13 July 2023, which feature 10 groups and six solo acts, including its youngest-ever contestant in Singapore's reality competition history. The list are as follows:

Key:

– Winner
– Runner-up/Top three
– Finalist/Eliminated on the first round of the Final
– Semifinalist/Eliminated on the Semifinal
– Quarterfinalist/Eliminated on the second Quarterfinals
– Quarterfinalist/Eliminated on the first Quarterfinals

Act	Age(s)	Occupation	Busking round	Result
The ETC 闲杂人等 (Note: The band consist of two members, Tristan Ong 王志文 (46) and Joey Wee 黄绣慧 (47))	46-47	Musicians	3	Winner
Evan Goh 吴宇凡	35	Busker	2	Runners-up (2nd-3rd place)
T Junction 红绿灯 (Note: The band consist of two members, Alina Mak 麦菽娟 (30) and Kimberly Lim Jia Rui 林佳蕊 (28))	28-30	Friends	2	Runners-up (2nd-3rd place)
Papaya Duck (Note: The band consist of two members, Audrina 吴玢 (30) and Grey Ying 刘秀颖 (31))	30-31	Musicians	4	Finalists (4th-5th place)
Part III (Note: The band consist of two members, Tan Yi Zhen 陈怡珍 (23) and June Yong 杨雯淇 (22))	22-23	Friends	3	Finalists (4th-5th place)
Cloud & Party (Note: The band consist of two members, Crystal 依然 (27) and Jayden 锦炫 (30))	27-30	Musicians	1	Semifinalist (6th place)
Gaston and Lucas (Note: The band consist of two members, Gaston Liew 刘振恩 (20) and Lucas Wang 黄宏溢 (20))	20	Friends	2	Quarterfinalists (Top 8)
phyllzx and elvern (Note: The band consist of two members, Elvern Wong 黄靖捷 (20) and Phyllis Lim 林芷馨 (24))	20-24	Live streamers	3	Quarterfinalists (Top 8)
Afterworkers 下班族 (Note: The band consist of three members, Joleyn Koh 许翔婷 (31), Yeo Ying Hao 杨应豪 (33) and Shaun Wong 翁磊 (41))	31-41	Workers	4	Quarterfinalists (Top 10)
The EMinor Band (Note: The band consist of two members, Simon Tu 涂艺兴 (39) and Estella Goh 吴蕙廷 (41))	39-41	Friends	1	Quarterfinalists (Top 10)
Be Happy (Note: The band consist of two members, Steve Han 韩欣元 (64) and Robin Neo 梁启辉 (59))	59-64	Workers	4	Eliminated in Busking round (Top 16)
BuskingRobin	54	Busker	3	Eliminated in Busking round (Top 16)
Kyean Lim 林伟祥	25	Musician	1	Eliminated in Busking round (Top 16)
Lyla Ng 黄姿宁	10	Student	2	Eliminated in Busking round (Top 16)
Gabriel Sim 沈政宁	18	Student	4	Eliminated in Busking round (Top 16)
Dawn Yap 叶芷彤	19	Musician	1	Eliminated in Busking round (Top 16)

== Live shows summary ==
=== Results summary ===
Result details

- Busker was the winner
- Busker finished as runners-up/Top three
- Busker was eliminated in the first round of the final
- Busker did not perform that week
- Busker was in the bottom three
- Busker was saved by public/judges' combined score
- Busker was saved by the public
- Busker finished last in the public vote but was not eliminated
- Busker was eliminated

Live show results per week
Busker	Live Busking rounds				Elimination rounds				
Busker	Week 1	Week 2	Week 3	Week 4	Week 5	Week 6 Quarterfinal 1	Week 7 Quarterfinal 2	Week 8 Semifinal	Week 9 Finale
The ETC 闲杂人等	N/A	N/A	Safe	N/A	Safe	Safe	Safe	Safe	Winner
Evan Goh 吴宇凡	N/A	Safe	N/A	N/A	Safe	Safe	Safe	Safe	Runners-up
T Junction 红绿灯	N/A	Safe	N/A	N/A	Safe	Safe	Safe	Safe	Runners-up
Papaya Duck	N/A	N/A	N/A	Safe	Bottom three	Safe	Safe	Safe	4th/5th place
Part III	N/A	N/A	Safe	N/A	Safe	Safe	Safe	Safe	4th/5th place
Cloud & Party	Safe	N/A	N/A	N/A	Safe	Safe	Safe	Eliminated	
Gaston and Lucas	N/A	Safe	N/A	N/A	Bottom three	Safe	Eliminated		
phyllzx and elvern	N/A	N/A	Safe	N/A	Safe	Safe	Eliminated		
Afterworkers 下班族	N/A	N/A	N/A	Safe	Safe	Eliminated			
The EMinor Band	Safe	N/A	N/A	N/A	Bottom three	Eliminated			
Be Happy	N/A	N/A	N/A	Eliminated					
Gabriel Sim 沈政宁	N/A	N/A	N/A	Eliminated					
BuskingRobin	N/A	N/A	Eliminated						
Lyla Ng 黄姿宁	N/A	Eliminated							
Kyean Lim 林伟祥	Eliminated								
Dawn Yap 叶芷彤	Eliminated								

=== Live Busking rounds ===
For the next four Sundays from 23 July to 13 August, four acts would compete in one of four rounds, each with a designated location across Singapore. Each busker had to sing two songs (with no particular genre) for this round, along with an interlude between songs to entertain the audience. QR codes directing to vote for the busker will be provided during the performance. Voting lines open during the episode's livestream at 4 p.m. until 11.59 p.m., which requires an active meCONNECT account in order to vote. Closed captioning for meWATCH are later added for past livestreams after voting period ended. A second round of voting for all buskers reopen on 14 August from 4.30 pm for 24 hours. Only public votes decided solely on the outcome itself; the ten acts with the most votes after four weeks will advance to the quarterfinals, which were announced on 22 August.

Color key:

Busker was saved by the public's votes
Busker was in the bottom three
Busker was eliminated

==== Week 1 (23 July) ====
The first round was held at Hougang Central Hub, located nearby Hougang Mall.

Busker	Order	Song	Result
Dawn Yap 叶芷彤	1	"眼泪记得你"/"逆光"	Eliminated
The EMinor Band	2	"踮起脚尖爱"/"你是我的眼"	Public's vote
Kyean Lim 林伟祥	3	"联名带姓"/"背叛"	Eliminated
Cloud & Party	4	"当你"/"听见下雨的声音"	Public's vote

==== Week 2 (30 July) ====
The second round was held at Paya Lebar Quarter (PLQ). Ng's father Eric appeared as an audience member.

Busker	Order	Song	Result
Gaston and Lucas	1	"你不知道的事"/"修炼爱情"	Public's vote
Evan Goh 吴宇凡	2	"我不难过"/"我很丑可是我很温柔"	Public's vote
T Junction 红绿灯	3	"如果可以"/"爱你"	Public's vote
Lyla Ng 黄姿宁	4	"朋友"/"今天不回家"	Eliminated

==== Week 3 (6 August) ====
The third round was held at Waterway Point at Punggol. Part III's member Tan Yi Zhen was absent on that day of performance due to illness.

Busker	Order	Song	Result
Part III	1	"Lemon Tree"/"听海"	Public's vote
The ETC 闲杂人等	2	"凉凉"/"无缘的结局"	Public's vote
BuskingRobin	3	"特别的爱给特别的你"/"月亮代表我的心"	Eliminated
phyllzx and elvern	4	"爱我别走"/"阿拉斯加海湾"	Public's vote

==== Week 4 (13 August) ====
The fourth and final round was held at Westgate, Singapore.

Busker	Order	Song	Result
Gabriel Sim 沈政宁	1	"Forever Love"/"有没有"	Eliminated
Papaya Duck	2	"我愿意"/"莉莉安"	Public's vote
Afterworkers 下班族	3	"至少还有你"/"天下有情人"	Public's vote
Be Happy	4	"天天想你"/"光辉岁月"	Eliminated

=== Elimination rounds ===
The top ten buskers will compete in five weeks of elimination rounds beginning 23 September to determine the winner of the competition. Unless otherwise stated, each episode's pre-recorded live-stream begin at 4.30 p.m.; similar to the Busking rounds, voting opens at the start of livestream until 11.59 p.m. (except for the Final details below), and requires a valid meCONNECT account to cast their vote. Like the Busking rounds, captions are added progressively after voting lines are closed. A two-part post-produced version of the competition, with never-before-seen behind-the-scenes and post-competition footage and its results, would broadcast on Channel 8 on Wednesday and Thursday 8 pm (only Chinese captions are provided).

Introduced as a twist during the elimination rounds (打赏战币), at any time during each of the performance, audience with a liking of it are allowed to go to the booth to collect a gold coin and then tip it to the suitcase. Each audience member was entitled to one coin per busker, and they can either choose to tip it or not for a particular singer. These battle coins would be used to "purchase" songs from a set of its songlist and determine their performance order. The number of coins obtained for each busker, along with the results for the week's performance were announced on the Thursday's episode.

==== Top 10 showcases (23 September) ====
The top ten performed its exhibition performances at Plaza Singapura. The first round of the voting took place, and votes from that week were carried over to the next week quarterfinals. While this week was a non-elimination, the bottom three in terms on the public vote were announced during the Thursday's episode (highlighted in blue).

Busker	Order	Song	Coins/Result
T Junction 红绿灯	1	"爱要坦荡荡"	24
Afterworkers 下班族	2	"温柔"	42
phyllzx and elvern	3	"月牙湾"	17
Evan Goh 吴宇凡	4	"人质"	36
Cloud & Party	5	"失恋无罪"	13
Gaston and Lucas	6	"等你等到我心痛"	18
The ETC 闲杂人等	7	"小薇"	41
Part III	8	"丑人多作怪"	30
Papaya Duck	9	"落叶归根"	33
The EMinor Band	10	"我还年轻我还年轻"	16

==== Quarterfinal 1 (30 September) ====
The first quarterfinal took place at Funan. Unlike the first week, buskers are not known on how many coins they earned during the performance, but instead being informed on the outcome of the results. The two buskers accumulating the fewest votes cast from the two weeks of shows would face elimination.

The songs are determined by the buskers through a format similar to auction sniping, and the song is given to the busker with the highest bid among other buskers who were interested in performing said song. The remaining coins will determine the busker's priority on allocating their order of performance; ties are broken by number of remaining coins, then the accumulated number of coins.

- Non-competition performance: AL4HA ("自由" / "你的呼唤")

Busker	Order	Song	Coins	Result
Gaston and Lucas	1	"简单爱"	12	Public's vote
Papaya Duck	2	"喜欢你"	29	Public's vote
Afterworkers 下班族	3	"刻在我心底的名字"	N/A (unknown)	Eliminated
Evan Goh 吴宇凡	4	"有一种悲伤"	58	Public's vote
T Junction 红绿灯	5	"太阳"	36	Public's vote
phyllzx and elvern	6	"恋爱ING"	33	Public's vote
Part III	7	"想见你想见你想见你"	35	Public's vote
The ETC 闲杂人等	8	"新不了情"	52	Public's vote
The EMinor Band	9	"小幸运"	N/A (unknown)	Eliminated
Cloud & Party	10	"好不容易"	41	Public's vote

==== Quarterfinal 2 (7 October) ====
Based on the number of coins obtained from the first quarterfinal, the busker will pair with another busker to perform at either one of four locations indicated below. Votes for the pair of buskers are unified, and the pair accumulating the fewest votes will be eliminated on the conclusion of this episode. Guest hosts and YES 933 radio anchors Zhu Zeliang and Lin Pin Juan were live at Bugis+. Unlike the first two weeks, there was only one post-produced episode airing on Wednesday.

- Non-competition performances: Gavin Teo (Wisma Atria; "Nothing's Gonna Change My Love for You"/"浪費"), Gao Meigui and Corrine Goh (Plaza Singapura; "空白格"/"你的甜蜜"), Hazelle Teo and Herman Keh (Bugis+; dance skit), Zhu Zeliang (Bugis+; "纸飞机") XXMXRCS (Cathay Cineleisure Orchard; "Down4U"/"我相信")

Legend	Performed at Bugis+	Performed at Cathay Cineleisure Orchard	Performed at Plaza Singapura	Performed at Wisma Atria

Busker	Order	Song	Coins	Result
The ETC 闲杂人等	1	"爱是怀疑"/"潇洒走一回"	85	Public's vote
Part III	1	"爱是怀疑"/"潇洒走一回"	85	Public's vote
Cloud & Party	2	"输了你赢了世界又如何"/"你敢不敢"	103	Public's vote
T Junction 红绿灯	2	"输了你赢了世界又如何"/"你敢不敢"	103	Public's vote
Gaston and Lucas	3	"爱人错过"/"OAOA"	N/A (unknown)	Eliminated
phyllzx and elvern	3	"爱人错过"/"OAOA"	N/A (unknown)	Eliminated
Evan Goh 吴宇凡	4	"囚鸟"/"听说爱情回来过"	104	Public's vote
Papaya Duck	4	"囚鸟"/"听说爱情回来过"	104	Public's vote

==== Semifinal (14 October) ====
The semifinalists compete at ION Orchard for a place in the final, singing on both local mandopop and xinyao songs. In addition to the public vote, the semifinal also features a judging panel, which consists of Peter Li, Hong Junyang and Ling Kai, in-lieu on the battle coins. The ratio for public vote-judge's score is 30%-70%, and the busker with the lowest overall score will be eliminated.

In the Wednesday's episode, buskers had to agree an amount of coins to be split among their partners. Unlike the first quarterfinal, the songlist (for the local mandopop songs) available by auction are referred by a part of the song's lyrics and not its actual name. Afterwards, priority for allocating order of performance starts on the busker with the least coins remaining, but subsequent buskers can override the order of other buskers if they desire. In the Thursday's episode, it was revealed that each song also contain another songlist of three songs (for xinyao songs) for the busker to choose from based on which song they picked.

- Non-competition performance: Jocie Guo ("温习"/"二人同行")

Busker	Order	Song	Public vote	Result
Cloud & Party	1	"我要快乐"/"另一首歌另一个伤心故事"	5th	Eliminated
Evan Goh 吴宇凡	2	"遗憾"/"久久才见到你的好"	3rd	Advanced
T Junction 红绿灯	3	"迟"/"我们这一班"	4th	Advanced
The ETC 闲杂人等	4	"王妃"/"从你回眸那天开始"	1st	Advanced
Part III	5	"陪我看日出"/"毕业以后"	2nd	Advanced
Papaya Duck	6	"别找我麻烦"/"恋之憩"	6th	Advanced

==== Final (5 November) ====
The final took place at CQ @ Clarke Quay Fountain Square, and the broadcast and voting began at 7.30pm instead. Similar to the semifinals, there was a judging panel which also contributed to the outcome of the competition. The judges for this episode are Jim Lim, Pakho Chau and Kay Huang. A pre-show leading up to the final was broadcast on 1 November.

The voting period for each round lasted until the end of all performances during the second round (votes cast in the first round froze at 8.30pm, and closed at 9.20pm); both the judges and public vote have equal say, and the top three buskers with the highest overall score at the end of the first round would advance to the second round to vie for the winner, determined by a combination of overall scores from both rounds. The priority to determine the performance order is based on the finalist's cumulative number of coins; however, they are not allowed to change their order upon making their decision, nor changing the order for other buskers. Goh received the most number of coins with 198, followed by The ETC's 178, Papaya Duck's 166, T Junction's 163, and Part III's 150.

- Non-competition performance: Top five finalists ("离开地球表面"), Priscilla Abby ("I Love The Sky"), Shigga Shay ("uKnow"), Kelvin Tan ("你这么舍得我难过"/"黄昏"), Pakho Chau ("月光浓汤"/"你害怕大雨吗")

Busker	Round 1		Round 2		Result
Busker	Order	Song	Order	Song	Result
T Junction 红绿灯	1	"天黑请闭眼"	6	"突然好想你"	Middle two
Papaya Duck	2	"夜来香"	N/A (already eliminated)		Bottom two
Part III	3	"狼"	N/A (already eliminated)		Bottom two
The ETC 闲杂人等	4	"北京一夜"	7	"又十年"	Winner
Evan Goh 吴宇凡	5	"爱如潮水"	8	"我爱的人"	Middle two

== Contestant appearances on other talent shows ==
- The ETC was a contestant in Lianhe Zaobao's radio show Sing Our Song, aired on 12 February 2020.
- Dawn Yap was a contestant and as a runner-up of the singing competition segment in the Season 28 (November 2020-February 2021) of the long-running game show The Sheng Siong Show.
- Steve Han of Be Happy was a contestant and winner in the 2013 season of Golden Age Talentime.
