= Pakho Chau =

Hong Kong singer and actor

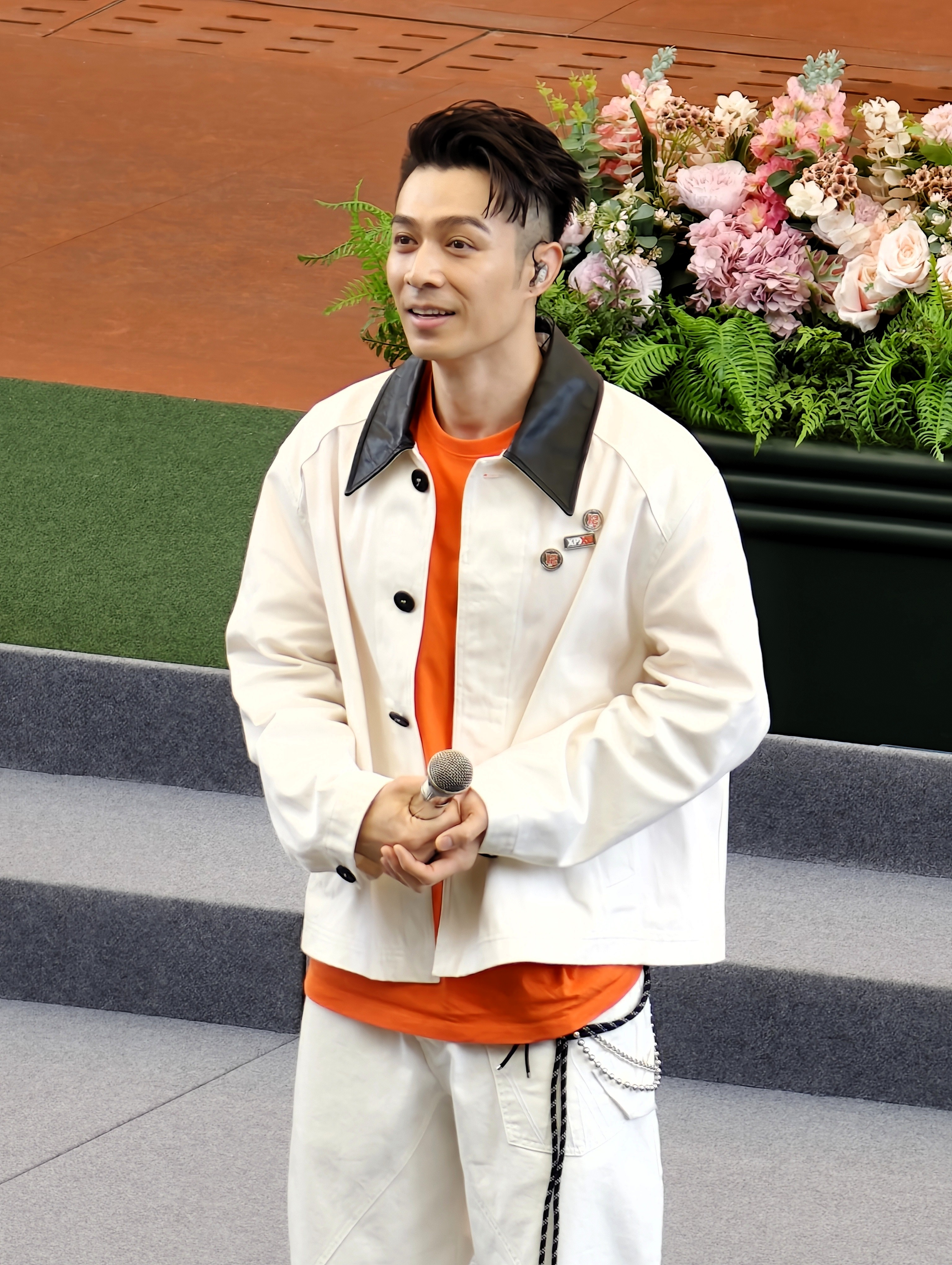
- Chau in April 2026
- Born: 12 November 1984 (age 41); British Hong Kong
- Occupations: Singer; songwriter; actor; record producer; entrepreneur; model
- Years active: 2007–present
- Height: 182 cm (5 ft 11 1/2 in)
- Spouse: Stephanie Chu (m. 2016)
- Children: 2
- Musical career
- Genres: Cantopop; pop; rock
- Instruments: Vocals; guitar; piano; harmonica; drums
- Labels: Warner Music (2007–2017); Voice Entertainment→TVB Music Group (2017–2023)

Chinese name
- Traditional Chinese: 周柏豪
- Simplified Chinese: 周柏豪
- Hanyu Pinyin: Zhōu Bóháo
- Jyutping: Zau1 paak3 hou4

Pakho Chau Pak-ho (Chinese: 周柏豪; born 12 November 1984), is a Hong Kong Cantopop singer, songwriter, and actor. He signed with Warner Music Group and officially entered the Hong Kong music industry in 2007. He left Warner Music in July 2017 and subsequently joined Voice Entertainment and TVB New Media. He is also the founder of two fashion brands, XPX and CATXMAN.

== Early and personal life ==
Having once represented Hong Kong in basketball, Chau has also worked as a lifeguard, swimming teacher, and piano teacher. Chau also enjoyed a brief stint as a part-time model signed to Hong Kong modelling agency StarzPeople, becoming a model and spokesperson for many large companies and brands in Hong Kong.

After a while, Chau decided to pursue his long-time passion for music, and saved up money to go abroad and learn more about music and production techniques. However, he was encouraged by his modelling manager to stay in Hong Kong, and was soon introduced to a well-known record producer in Hong Kong, Chan Kwong-Wing (陳光榮). After an initial meeting, Chau worked in Chan's recording studio as an unpaid engineer for almost two years, recording and producing demos and commercial jingles.

His musical talent was noticed by Chan, and soon Chau was offered a recording contract and signed to Warner Music Group in 2007.

On 2 December 2019, 35-year-old Chau and his wife secretly gave birth to their daughter, Chau Sum-yuet (Sonya). Chau said that the most romantic thing he ever did was to write a four-part song for his wife.

In March 2021, Chau expressed his support for cotton from Xinjiang, after several companies stopped purchasing the cotton due to concerns about human rights violations.

== Career ==
Having played the piano since the age of 5, and being able to play the guitar, Chau is also a songwriter. From his debut EP Beginning, Chau wrote one song, and penned the lyrics for four others.

Due to his work experience as a recording studio engineer, Chau has also produced many of his own songs.

Chau’s debut single, "Same Sky" (同天空), became a hit song in Hong Kong. His second single, "Six Days" (六天) also achieved popularity.

Chau's popularity was determined within three days of the release of his debut EP Beginning, which sold more than 6000 copies. This resulted in a strong demand for a second shipment of his debut EP.

In May 2008, a duet with Cantopop starlet Stephanie Cheng was released, called "Nothing Done" (一事無成). This song became massively popular, achieving commercial success and reached the top of many music charts in Hong Kong.

In July 2008, in time for the Hong Kong Book Fair, Chau released a photo album, containing a collection of his own words and photos. This photo album was called "Here's Where It All Began" (我的開始在這裡), and sold extremely well, with a second edition being released in the following month.

Chau’s second album, entitled Continue, was released on 21 August 2008.

After releasing several singles, Chau released Follow on 10 July 2009. This collection consisted of 4 new tracks, and several previously released tracks. Following on from the previous year, Chau released another photo album for the Hong Kong Book Fair, called "This Is My Time Machine" (假如我有時光機).

In 2016, Chau’s singing career was in a state of rest. There were no new albums released throughout the year. He only took over "Good Take" and "My Wife Is a Star" throughout the year. In the same year, he founded his own brand CATXMAN, and on 26 November, he married his girlfriend in Phuket, Thailand.

In 2017, Chau returned to the music industry. In January, he released the new song "One Day" and the two champion song "Finally We". In February, he released the new song "How Do I Look" and the champion song "Near Thousand Miles" in collaboration with Wei Lan. Two new songs, "Angry Flower" and "Xiao", were released in March. Another new song, "Touchscreen", was released in April. In order to celebrate his tenth year in the industry, Chau held a three-time ONE STEP CLOSER concert celebration in Hong Kong Coliseum in April.

Chau and Charlene Choi’s first film, "Forgive Him 77 Times", was released on 15 June 2017, and the box office exceeded 10 million Hong Kong dollars within a week. The two released the chorus song "Please Love Me" on 25 April.

In 2019, Chau starred as the first male lead in the drama Wonder Women, starring opposite Miriam Yeung. With his role as Wing Ho-tin (Oppa), Chau won Most Popular Male Character at the 2019 TVB Anniversary Awards.

Chau, together with Benjamin Yuen, won the Best Host award for "The PakhoBen Outdoor Show" at the 2020 TVB Anniversary Awards.

== Discography ==
=== Extended plays ===
- Beginning (2007)
- Continue (2008)
- Remembrance (2010)
- 本體分裂 Splitting (2011)
- Get Well Soon (2012)
- 同行 Together (2014)
- White (2015)
- Roundabout (2015)
- One Step Closer (2017)

=== Studio albums ===
- 8 (2013)
- Keep Going (2014)

== Concerts and tours ==
=== Tours ===
==== One Step Closer Pakho Live 2017–2018 ====
Tour
Date	no.of shows	Venue	Note
28-30 April 2017	3	Hong Kong Coliseum	10th Anniversary Concert; 3-side stage
23 September 2017	1	Guangzhou Gymnasium	
21 October 2017	1	Cotai Arena	
9 December 2017	1	Huizhou Olympic Stadium	
13 January 2018	1	Shenzhen Gymnasium	
20 January 2018	1	Nanhai Gymnasium	
17 March 2018	1	Zhanjiang Sports Centre	
1 December 2018	1	Jiangmen	
Pending	Pending	Dongguan	
Pending	Pending	Shanghai	

Set lists
1. 同天空
2. 自由意志 Keep Going
3. 起跳 Take Off
4. Imperfect
5. 怒花 Nova
6. 小白+相安無事 Little White+We'll Be Fine
7. 莫失莫忘 Don't Forget
8. 後援 Backup
9. How Do I Look
10. 露齒 Say Cheers
11. 今天應該很快樂
12. 斬立決 Death Row
13. 天下大亂 Chaos
14. Toys intro
15. 宏願
16. 最好不過 Best Though
17. 同行 Together
18. 祝君好 Good Luck (ft. Chilam)
19. Smiley Face (Chilam Solo)
20. 百年不合 A Hundred Year
21. 天光 Daylight
22. 我的宣言 My Vow
23. 終於我們 One Step Closer
24. 無力挽回 Irreversible
25. 只有一事不成全你 Only One Thing Cannot Satisfy You
26. 異能 Alpha
27. 摔角 In The Ring
28. 金 Gold
Encore
1. 報告總司令
2. 六天
3. 還記得 Still Remember

== Filmography ==
=== Film ===
- Shrek the Third as the voice of "Gingerbread Man", in the Cantonese version (2007)
- Love Is Elsewhere (愛情萬歲) as "Joe Yeung" (2008)
- 10 Promises to My Dog (我和尋回犬的十個約定) as the voice of "Yuichi", in the Cantonese version (2008)
- Madagascar: Escape 2 Africa as the voice of "Moto Moto", in the Cantonese version (2008)
- Basic Love (愛情故事) (2009)
- Out of Proportion (玩大咗) (2009)
- Seven 2 One (關人7事) (2009)
- Split Second Murders (死神傻了) (2009)
- I Corrupt All Cops (金錢帝國) (2009)
- Once a Gangster (飛砂風中轉) (2010)
- The Way We Were (2011)
- Hong Kong Ghost Stories (猛鬼愛情故事) (2011)
- Lan Kwai Fong (喜愛夜浦) (2011)
- I Sell Love (2014)
- Streets of Macao (2014)
- S for Sex, S for Secret (2015)
- 12 Golden Ducks (12金鴨) (2015)
- Guilty (2015)
- Love Detective (2015)
- Super Models (2015)
- Big Fortune Hotel (2015)
- My Wife Is a Superstar (2016)
- Delusion (2016)
- Good Take! (2016)
- 77 Heartbreaks (2017)
- The Sinking City – Capsule Odyssey (2017)
- Winning Buddha 2 (2019)
- The Infernal Walker (2020)
- 77 Heartwarmings (2021)
- Death Notice (2023)

=== Television series ===
- 2008: This Is My Home (我是香港人) as Ah Siu
- 2009: ICAC Investigators 2009 (廉政行動2009) as 周栢堅 (Kenny Chow Pak-kin)
- 2016: A Time of Love 2 as 杜錦煇 (To Kam-fai)
- 2017: Line Walker: The Prelude as 樂少峰 (Lok Siu-fung)
- 2018: Another Era as 程凱 (Ching Hoi)
- TBA: The Spectator as 王覓希 (Wong Mik-hei)

=== Variety and reality show ===
- 2021: Stars Academy – coach
- 2022: Call Me by Fire – contestant
- 2023: Battle of the Buskers – guest judge

=== Other appearances ===
- 2003: Wildchild (野仔) – Zhang Mou (張某)
- 2004: Monie Tung (董敏莉) – Men And Women Eating (飲食男女), Pool Party (池畔派對)
- 2004: Stephanie Cheng (鄭融) – Popular Applause (叫好叫座)
- 2004: Renee Dai (戴夢夢) – Witness (當事人)
- 2005: Hong Kong Baptist University Film And Television Works master's degree production – Life in the Works (活在筆下)
- 2007: Elanne Kong (江若琳) – Wrong Love (錯愛)
- 2010: Shiga Lin (連詩雅) – I Don't Wanna Be Lonely
