= Heyi Pictures =

Chinese film production company

- Native name: 合一影业有限公司
- Industry: Film
- Headquarters: China
- Key people: Liu Kailuo (President)
- Parent: Youku Tudou

Heyi Pictures is a Chinese film production company owned by Youku Tudou.

== Filmography ==
Release date	Title	Gross (in yuan)	Ref.
February 10, 2015	Somewhere Only We Know	CN¥283.5 million	
April 2, 2015	Let's Get Married	CN¥284.5 million	
April 17, 2015	Ever Since We Love	CN¥148.3 million	
June 19, 2015	The Ark of Mr. Chow	CN¥50.7 million	
June 27, 2015	The Three Pigs and the Lamp	CN¥23.8 million	
July 10, 2015	Forever Young	CN¥379 million	
July 16, 2015	Monster Hunt	CN¥2,439.5 million	
July 24, 2015	Only You	CN¥67.9 million	
July 31, 2015	Paris Holiday	CN¥17.9 million	
August 19, 2015	Cities in Love	CN¥53.7 million	
August 27, 2015	A Tale of Three Cities	CN¥12.2 million	
October 16, 2015	The Coffin in the Mountain	CN¥10.7 million	
December 10, 2015	The Master	CN¥54.8 million	
February 8, 2016	Mr. Nian	CN¥34.5 million	
March 18, 2016	The Rise of a Tomboy	CN¥63.4 million	
April 1, 2016	Chongqing Hot Pot	CN¥370.5 million	
TBA	Bleeding Steel	TBD	
