= Jeremy Tsui =

Chinese actor

Xu Zhengxi
- Born: 5 May 1985 (age 41); Shanghai, China
- Other name: Jeremy Tsui
- Occupation: Actor
- Years active: 2007–present

Chinese name
- Traditional Chinese: 徐正曦
- Simplified Chinese: 徐正溪
Transcriptions

Xu Zhengxi (Chinese: 徐正溪, born 5 May 1985), also known as Jeremy Tsui, Izz Xu, Jones Xu or Jeremy Jones Xu is a Chinese actor.

== Career ==
He first gained attention with his portrayal of male lead Ji Rufeng in 2011 modern romance drama Waking Love Up, and was able to revitalise his career with the antagonist roles Yuwen Hu in the historical drama The Legend of Dugu and Li Wangping in Republican drama Siege in Fog.

== Filmography ==
=== Film ===
Year	English title	Chinese title	Role	Notes
2007	Naraka 19	第十九层空间	Gao Xuan	
2008	A Decade of Love	十分钟情	Mr. Gu	
2009	Love Story	爱情故事	Ah Xi	
2009	Seven 2 One	关人7事	Zheng Xi	
2010	The Child's Eye	童眼	Ah Xi	
2011	The Detective 2	B+侦探	Ling Jiahui	
2012	Love Lifting	高举爱	Jian	
2012	My Sassy Hubby	我老公不靠谱	Lin Shuhao	
2014	Kung Fu Angels	青春鬥	Wen An	
2015	Paris Holiday	巴黎假期	Ah Jie	
2016	Bounty Hunters	赏金猎人	Tommy	
2020	Assassinate Yuwen Hu	刺杀宇文护	Yuwen Hu	

=== Television series ===
Year	English title	Chinese title	Role	Network	Notes
2007	Love Multiplication	爱情新呼吸	Qiang Sen	CTS	
2009	Invisible Target	男兒本色	Shi Xiaoren	Zhejiang TV	
2011	My Daughters	夏家三千金	Yan Liheng	Anhui TV	
2011	Unbeatable 2	无懈可击之高手如林	Zhang Dayu	Anhui TV	
2011	Waking Love Up	爱情睡醒了	Ji Rufeng	Anhui TV	
2013	Painted Skin	画皮之真爱无悔	Xiao Yang	Shenzhen TV	
2013	The Spies	穷追不舍	Wu Renpu	Xianing TV	
2013	Pearl	爱闪亮	Gao Ran	Jiangsu TV	
2014	Brave Lover	加油爱人	Cheng Xi	Hunan TV	
2014	The Virtuous Queen of Han	卫子夫	Duan Hong	Anhui TV, Dragon TV, Zhejiang TV	
2016	Four Ladies	翩翩冷少俏佳人	Song Wenxi	Nantong Channel	
2016	Hope Husband Success	望夫成龙	Zhang Mengqi	Shenchuan TV	
2016	My Adorable Husband	我的蠢萌老公	Luo Yi	iQiyi	
2016	The Legend of Flying Daggers	飞刀又见飞刀	Li Manqing (young)	Youku	Guest appearance
2017	Angelo	天使的幸福	Jiang Feng'en	Mango TV	
2018	The Legend of Dugu	独孤天下	Yuwen Hu	Tencent	
2018	Siege in Fog	人生若如初相见	Li Wangping / Pan Jianchi	Tencent	
2018	The Taoism Grandmaster	玄门大师	King of Boti	iQiyi	Guest appearance
2018	Gossip High	舌害	Jincheng Jiahui	iQiyi	
2018	Guardian Angel 2018 Web Drama	守护神之保险调查	Ken	iQiyi	Guest appearance (episode 30)
2019	Legend of the Phoenix	凤弈	Wei Guang	Tencent	
2019	Return the World to You	归还世界给你	Qin Ye	Jiangsu TV	
2019	Ten Years Late	十年三月三十日	Zhao Chengzhi	iQiyi, Tencent	
2020	Fairyland Lovers	蓬莱间	Shen Zui	Tencent	Guest appearance
2020	Novoland: The Castle in the Sky 2	九州天空城2	Xue Jingkong	Tencent	
2020	Trace	痕迹	Liao Yan	Tencent	
2021	Loving the Earth	燃情大地	Duan Tie		
2022	Yan Yu Fu	嫣语赋	Liang Yi	WeTV	
2026	Blossoms of Power	百花杀	Xiao Changqing	Tencent Video	
2026	The Lament of Autumn	玉簟秋	Jin Zhongfang	Hunan TV	

== Awards and nominations ==
Year	Award	Category	Nominated work	Result	Ref.
2016	Mobile Video Festival	Popular Role Model	—N/a	Won	
2018	12th Tencent Video Star Awards	Breakthrough Actor Award	The Legend of Dugu	Won	
2018	5th The Actors of China Award Ceremony	Outstanding Actor	The Legend of Dugu	Won	
2019	CCTV Spring Gala	Youth Role Model	—N/a	Won	
2019	Golden Bud - The Fourth Network Film And Television Festival	Best Actor	Legend of the Phoenix, Return the World to You, Ten Years Late	Nominated	
2019	Bazaar Beauty Awards	Best New Charismatic Actor	—N/a	Won	

== Personal life ==
In September 2013, Hong Kong magazine caught him with actress Niki Chow, revealing their love affair. August 31, 2015 it was reported that they broke up.
