= Punished =

2011 Hong Kong film by Law Wing-cheung

- Film poster

Chinese name
- Traditional Chinese: 報應
- Simplified Chinese: 报应
Transcriptions
- Directed by: Law Wing-cheung
- Screenplay by: Andrew Fung; Lam Fung
- Produced by: Johnnie To
- Starring: Anthony Wong; Richie Jen; Janice Man
- Cinematography: Ko Chiu-lam
- Edited by: David Richardson; Curran Pang
- Music by: Guy Zerafa; Dave Kiotz
- Production companies: Media Asia Films; Milkyway Image
- Distributed by: Media Asia Distributions
- Release date: 5 May 2011
- Running time: 94 minutes
- Country: Hong Kong
- Language: Cantonese

Punished, also known as Bou ying, is a 2011 Hong Kong thriller film directed by Law Wing-cheung. The film stars Anthony Wong, Richie Jen, and Janice Man.

== Plot ==
The story starts with a real estate tycoon, Wong Ho-chiu (Anthony Wong), who is celebrating his wife (Maggie Cheung Ho-yee) and adult daughter Daisy's (Janice Man) birthday. Daisy wants to travel overseas, in particular to see the Salar de Uyuni in Bolivia, but Wong gets into an argument with her and she runs out of the house. The next day, Wong receives a cellphone video message of Daisy, who has been kidnapped, with her captors demanding ten million for her release. Wong does not report this to the police, as he thinks it is his own daughter who has abducted herself and is requesting money for it. He warns the kidnappers that if anything happens to Daisy, he will stop at nothing to avenge her. Because of this threat, the kidnappers become agitated and decide to kill Daisy by leaving her bound, gagged and blindfolded, with a plastic bag over her head to suffocate her.

Meanwhile, Wong asks his most trusted bodyguard, Chor (Richen Jen), to look for her. While searching, Chor manages to find the location of Daisy's body. When the news reaches Wong, he is distraught to learns that his daughter is dead. He nonetheless lies to everyone by saying that Daisy is alive and was instead sent to L.A. Wong turns to Chor to seek out the perpetrators and exact revenge. Wong goes one step further and orders Chor to videotape each of their executions. Each time a videotape of the execution is sent to Wong , he engages in a prayer. When the third perpetrator is tracked down, Wong's wife gets to know about the matter and asks Wong to stop the revenge killings. He refuses, leading to his wife leaving him.

During Wong's medical check-up, his doctor told him that his assistant came to pick up Daisy's heart ailment medicine. Only then does Wong realize who the final perpetrator is and requests Chor to bring him over, as he wants to kill that person himself. The final perpetrator turns out to be Daisy's female assistant. While fighting, she falls off the rooftop and it is revealed she has a daughter. When Wong sees the daughter, he recalls Daisy's childhood and he has second thoughts of killing the assistant. They pull her up to safety and leave the scene. Chor tells Wong that if anything happens he'll take the blame for everything, but Wong tells him that the weight of what they've done is not his to bear and he doesn't want to trouble him anymore. They agree to never see each other again and part ways.

Having taken revenge on his daughter's murderers, Wong goes to Bolivia with Daisy's ashes to Salar de Uyuni. He spreads her ashes before breaking down and crying.

== Cast ==
- Anthony Wong as Wong Ho-chiu
- Richie Jen as Chor
- Janice Man as Daisy
- Maggie Cheung as Mrs. Wong
- Candy Lo as May
- Lam Lei as Pang
- Jun Kung as Pang's accomplice
- Charlie Cho as T.K. Chiu
- Elena Kong as Wong Ho-chiu's deceased wife
- Alan Chui Chung-San as Yao's ex-triad boss

== Release ==
The film was released in Hong Kong on 5 May 2011.
