= Nessun Dorma (film) =

2016 Hong Kong film by Herman Yau

- Official film poster
- Traditional Chinese: 兇手還未睡
- Simplified Chinese: 凶手还未睡
- Hanyu Pinyin: Xiōng Shǒu Hái Wèi Shuì
- Jyutping: Hung1 Sau2 Waan4 Mei6 Seoi6
- Directed by: Herman Yau
- Screenplay by: Erica Li; Zendodric
- Based on: Nessun Dorma by Erica Li and Zendoric
- Produced by: Paco Wong; Ken Yue; Stanley Tong
- Starring: Gordon Lam; Andy Hui; Janice Man
- Cinematography: Joe Chan
- Edited by: Azrael Chung
- Music by: Mak Chun Hung
- Production companies: Sun Entertainment Culture; Homemade Holdings; Sil-Metropole Organisation
- Distributed by: Bravos Pictures
- Release dates: 22 March 2016 (HKIFF); 27 October 2016 (Hong Kong)
- Running time: 90 minutes (HKIFF); 88 minutes (Hong Kong)
- Country: Hong Kong
- Language: Cantonese

Nessun Dorma is a 2016 Hong Kong psychological thriller film directed by Herman Yau and starring Gordon Lam, Andy Hui and Janice Man. The film is based on the novel of the same title by Erica Li and Zendodric, both of whom also served as the film's screenwriters. Nessun Dorma had its world premiere at the 40th Hong Kong International Film Festival on 22 March 2016 and was theatrically released in Hong Kong on 27 October.

== Cast ==
- Gordon Lam as Vincent Lee (李偉臣)
- Andy Hui as Fong Mo-chit (Ngai Man-yin) (方慕哲)
- Janice Man as Jasmine Tsang (曾斯敏)
- Wilfred Lau as Fong Mo-chit
- Jacky Cai as Mimi
- Tarah Chan as Amy (Club Girl)
- Phat Chan as Vincent's Driver
- Julius Brian Siswojo (credited as Brian Lee) as Apartment Security
- Candice Yu as Jasmine's mother

== Production ==
Filming for Nessun Dorma began on 2 August 2015. Due to the complexity of her role in the film, Janice Man reportedly suffered from insomnia for a few weeks during production of the film.

== Release ==
The film had its world premiere at the 40th Hong Kong International Film Festival on 22 March 2016, where it showed the original Category III-rated version of the film. A new Category IIB-rated version of the film was theatrical released in Hong Kong on 27 October.

== Reception ==
=== Box office ===
The film grossed CN¥2.15 million in mainland China.

=== Critical reception ===
Elizabeth Kerr of The Hollywood Reporter calls the film a "pulpy, unchallenged slice of genre entertainment", stating how "viewers will enjoy for what it is and forget quickly", while also praising Gordon Lam's performance.
