= The Coffin in the Mountain =

- Poster
- 心迷宫
- Directed by: Xin Yukun
- Screenplay by: Xin Yukun; Feng Yuanliang
- Story by: Lu Nifan
- Produced by: Ren Jiangzhou
- Starring: Huo Weimin; Wang Xiaotian; Luo Yun; Sun Li; Shao Shengjie; Cao Xi'an; Jia Zhigang; Zhu Ziqing; Wang Zichen
- Cinematography: Sam Ho
- Edited by: Xin Yukun
- Music by: Zhang Lei
- Production companies: Beijing Taihe Entertainment; Beijing Haipingmian Entertainment; Heyi Pictures; Beijing Weiying Shidai Technology; Shanghai Gewa Business Information Consulting
- Release dates: July 24, 2014 (First Film Festival); October 16, 2015 (China)
- Running time: 110 minutes
- Country: China
- Language: Mandarin
- Box office: CN¥0.5 million

The Coffin in the Mountain (Chinese: 心迷宫), also known as Deep in the Heart, is a 2014 Chinese suspense crime drama black comedy film directed by Xin Yukun. The film was released on October 16, 2015.

== Plot ==
The film progresses on a non-linear timeline and ties together the contemporaneous stories of several protagonists who are from the same rural village in a mountainous region. In the first story, Xiao Zongyao, the son of the strict and exemplary village chief, Xiao Weiguo, is informed by his girlfriend, Huang Huan, that she is pregnant during their clandestine meeting in the forest. They are overheard by the village ne’er-do-well, Bai Hu, who tries to blackmail Zongyao. In the ensuing scuffle between the two men, Bai Hu falls and dies. Zongyao and Huan cover the body with dry branches and flee together to the nearest city. Zongyao frantically searches for a commendation medal he had stolen from his father before he left home that evening, worried that he may have dropped the medal near Bai Hu’s body. The next day, Huan discovers that she is bleeding which implies that she has miscarried, although she keeps this a secret from Zongyao. The two discuss what to do and the next day, Zongyao decides to return to the village and give himself up. Before reaching the village, Zongyao comes across a funeral procession and is told by one of the mourners that Bai Hu has died, his body burnt beyond recognition, after falling asleep drunk in the forest and setting his surroundings on fire with his cigarette butt.

In the second story, which starts earlier on the night of Bai Hu’s death, villager Li Qin, wife of the abusive and philandering Chen Zili, is having an affair with another married villager Wang Baoshan. They quarrel and Li Qin dares Baoshan to kill Chen Zili. After leaving Li Qin’s house, Baoshan stops by the convenience store owned by Zhuang, who is secretly in love with Li Qin and likely jealous of Baoshan. Zhuang then observes Baoshan walking off in the direction that Huan was seen to be going when she had walked by a few minutes before. The next morning, Li Qin discovers that Baoshan has been accused of killing Huan, who had disappeared overnight, and burning her body. In front of other villagers, Baoshan asks Li Qin to provide him with an alibi for the time of the supposed murder. Li Qin refuses and goes home. Later, Li Qin is informed that the identity card of her husband Chen Zili had been found on the burnt body and that the corpse is his. Baoshan is released. Zhuang, who had caused the villagers to suspect Baoshan for killing Huan, arranges the funeral of Chen Zili, to curry favor with Li Qin. On his way back to the village after buying goods for the funeral, Zhuang is waved down by a man by the roadside. He is shocked to see that it is Chen Zili, alive and well. Zhuang gives Zili a lift and Zili promptly falls asleep in the van. Zhuang picks up a rock to smash Zili’s head in but doesn’t go through with it eventually. Zili wakes up and goes off into the bushes to relieve himself. Zili’s phone rings, and he answers but accidentally drops it. Startled, he loses his footing and plunges off the steep cliff where he had been relieving himself, apparently to his death.

In another storyline, we see Bai Hu in the city shortly before his death. He repeatedly borrows money from loan sharks to fund his gambling addiction. He also appears to be sick, and has a nosebleed. He meets Chen Zili in the city by chance on the morning of his death, and it is implied that he steals Zili’s wallet which also contained Zili’s identity card. Bai Hu then makes his way to the village, reaching it at night, where he comes across Zongyao and Huan, resulting in his own death. The loan sharks come to the village the next morning to collect the debt and, unable to find Bai Hu, threaten to burn down the house of Bai Guoqing, Bai Hu’s elder brother.

In the last story which begins around the time of Bai Hu’s death, village chief Xiao Weiguo, Zongyao’s father, is walking home through the forest after attending an unrelated funeral. He hears the commotion caused by the altercation between his son and Bai Hu, and witnesses the latter’s death. After his son has fled, Weiguo drags the body to another spot closer to the village and burns it. The next morning, Weiguo pretends to find the charred body by accident, after he and another villager spot the smoke. The villagers first assume it is Huan and later that it is Chen Zili. Deeply remorseful, Weiguo calls Chen Zili to prove that he is still alive, which results in the phone call that causes Zili’s fall from the cliff. The police find Zili’s body and contacts Li Qin, who goes to identify his body and collect his ashes. Zhuang drives Li Qin in his van and Li Qin discovers Zili’s walking cane, which had been left behind in the van. Li Qin takes the cane and rejects Zhuang’s romantic intentions. Li Qin leaves the coffin containing Bai Hu’s body with Weiguo, asking him to locate the unknown deceased’s kin.

Bai Guoqing, Bai Hu’s brother, goes to Weiguo with a request to use the coffin to stage Bai Hu’s death and fool the loan sharks. Thinking that Bai Hu will finally get a proper burial by his real family, Weiguo agrees. The Bai family holds the funeral procession and succeed in deceiving the loan sharks that Bai Hu is dead. But instead of burying him, the Bais leave the coffin in the open mountainside, reasoning that the body would be claimed by others. Overcome with guilt and unable to have closure, Weiguo takes Zongyao to the police and tell the authorities the whole story.

== Cast ==
- Huo Weimin as Xiao Weiguo
- Wang Xiaotian as Xiao Zongyao
- Luo Yun as Huang Huan
- Sun Li as Li Qin
- Shao Shengjie as Wang Baoshan
- Cao Xi'an as Chen Zili
- Jia Zhigang as Zhuang
- Zhu Ziqing as Bai Hu
- Wang Zichen as Bai Guoqing
- Zheng Yiqian as Xiaofeng

== Reception ==
=== Box office ===
The film has earned CN¥0.529 million at the Chinese box office.

=== Critical response ===
Derek Elley of Film Business Asia gave the film a 6 out of 10, calling it "cleverly plotted but cramped by arty-indie direction."

== Accolades ==
The film won the Grand Prix at the 30th Warsaw International Film Festival in Poland.
