= Basic Love =

2009 Hong Kong film by Oxide Pang

- Film poster
- Directed by: Oxide Pang
- Written by: Oxide Pang
- Produced by: Daniel Lam
- Starring: Elanne Kong; Rex Ho; Janice Man
- Cinematography: Puccini Yu
- Edited by: Curran Pang
- Music by: Ronald Ng
- Production company: Universe Entertainment
- Distributed by: Universe Films Distribution Company Limited
- Release date: 26 February 2009
- Running time: 106 minutes
- Country: Hong Kong
- Language: Cantonese

Basic Love (simplified Chinese: 爱情故事; traditional Chinese: 愛情故事 is a 2009 Hong Kong romantic drama film directed by Oxide Pang.

== Plot ==
A romantic story symphonised with the song of a triangular relationship between Ling (Elanne Kong), June (Janice Man) and Rex (Rex Ho). Ling got leukaemia since she was a child; she hides the true feeling and health condition from her best friends, Rex and June. June who moved from China to HK when she was little, assists her mother to make a living hardily resulting in a self-contained character. The two girls are completely different in personality, yet they're frank with each other. June feels for Rex. Meanwhile, June seems to overlook an admirer, Hee (Xu Zheng Xi). It's graduation time, they're standing in front of the crossroad to their future, and none of them takes a step closer to change their relationship, until the day when Ling is admitted to the hospital, the long compression of emotion is broken.

== Cast ==
- Elanne Kong as Ling
- Rex Ho as Rex
- Janice Man as June
- Xu Zheng Xi as Jin Hee
- James Ho as James
- Brian Li as Brian
- Yumi Yin as Yumi
- Cheng Pei-pei as Ling's grandmother
- Sek Lan as Ling's mother
- Gary Chiu as Gary
- Pakho Chau
- Nelson Cheung as June's boss

== See also ==
- Hong Kong films of 2009
