= Joey Wee =

Female pop vocalist based in Singapore

- 黄绣惠
- Born: Malaysia
- Occupations: Singer; Song-writer
- Musical career
- Genres: Mandopop; Dance
- Instrument: Vocals
- Label: Hydrangea Entertainment
- Formerly of: The ETC

Chinese name
- Traditional Chinese: 黃繡惠
- Simplified Chinese: 黄绣惠
Transcriptions
Standard Mandarin
- Hanyu Pinyin: Huáng Xiùhuì

Joey Wee (Chinese: 黄绣惠; pinyin: Huáng Xiùhuì; born 28 November 2000), is a singer and song-writer, based in Singapore. She was the winner in the second season of 90an Gerek! and Battle of the Buskers in Singapore.

Wee is a pop vocalist who performs at a wide range of events and occasions such as corporate functions and weddings. She is also a multilingual performer, performing in Mandarin, English, Hokkien, Cantonese and Malay.

== Career ==
=== 2010–2019 ===
In 2013, Wee participated in and won Mediacorp Suria Channel’s Malay singing competition 90an Gerek!.

In 2014, Wee released her first cover HIFI album Heart Songs (心歌). Wee performed for two sold-out ticketed mini concerts, Heart Songs, at All About Eve Bar. On 7 April 2014, Wee represented Singapore in the opening performance for “2014 China-ASEAN Cultural Exchange Year” in Beijing, China.

In September 2015, the venue where Wee had been performing at, was relocated and decided to end 'Live' performance activities. Wee saw the opportunity to act on an idea that had long been in her mind – busking. She decided to form a busking duo with Singaporean keyboardist Tristan Ong. The ETC (闲杂人等) was eventually formed as a trio with the late Singaporean musician Tang Yuxuan joining the duo.

In 2018, she held a ticketed concert in Penang, organised by Simply Fine Arts. And she also actively sings at various fundraising events (singing for good causes) throughout Malaysia.

=== 2020–2024 ===
In 2021, Wee released her first digital single Can You Hear Me? (你听得到吗?), which was composed and written by Gavin Xie Yu Xuan for her during the COVID-19 pandemic. Xie was one of Wee's music partners on Facebook Live streaming during the lockdown period where borders were closed.

In 2023, ETC (闲杂人等) made it to the top 10 and eventually emerged as the champion of Mediacorp Channel 8’s reality show Battle of the Buskers. As part of Esplanade's Coffee Morning & Afternoon Tea series, Wee held her ticketed 'Songs from Old Shanghai' concert at the Esplanade Recital Studio.

As part of Huayi - Chinese Festival of the Arts 2024, Wee was invited back to perform at the Esplanade Concourse on 22 February 2024.

=== 2025 - present ===
On 10 February 2025, Wee officially announced that she will no longer be accepting any performances arranged by Tristan Ong, under the name of The ETC. Meanwhile, she will return to focus on her solo career. In June 2025, Wee was invited by her first vocal coach/teacher, Dr. Zhang Fan, to perform at fund-raising events in Taiping and Penang, Malaysia. Wee was invited back to perform at the Esplanade Concourse on 11 November 2025.

Wee released three singles: Disrupt (混世), Summer (夏天) and Tea Bone Nanyang (茶骨南洋) in the second half of 2025.

Unlike her usual slower numbers, Wee challenged herself by releasing her original single Disrupt (混世). As Disrupt is a fast song with K-pop elements and rapping, Wee had to dance in her music video.

Tea Bone Nanyang (茶骨南洋) was composed in conjunction with SG60 and the 100th anniversary of Pek Sin Choon. The music video was directed by Singaporean filmmaker Kelvin Sng.

== Discography ==
=== Studio Album ===
Year	English title	Chinese title	Details	Ref.
2013	Heart Songs	Joey惠/心歌	Released: December 2013; Label: Dreamland Production; Formats: CD; Track listing: 1. 在说一声爱你; 2. 决定; 3. 恰似你的温柔; 4. 你没来; 5. 庭院深深; 6. 月亮代表我的心(满月版); 7. 月光小乐曲; 8. 心痛的感觉; 9. 霧 10. 你没来; 11. 月亮代表五的心(One Take版）还没说再见...	

=== Single ===
Year	English title	Chinese title	Credits	Released	Ref.
2021	Can You Hear Me?	你听得到吗?	Composer/Lyricist: Gavin Xie; Producer: Ng Haosheng	30 Dec	
2025	Disrupt	混世	Composer: Chee Yew Chung; Lyricist: Charlene Huang; Producer: Chee Yew Chung, Jaydos	24 Jul	
2025	Summer	夏天	Composer/Lyricist: Joey Wee; Producer: Joey Wee, Ng Haosheng	22 Nov	
2025	Tea Bone Nanyang	茶骨南洋	Composer: Joey Wee; Lyricists: Joey Wee, Ma Keow Yuen, Yuen Eng Wah; Producer: Ng Haosheng	23 Dec	
2026	Move Forward	往前走	Composer: Joey Wee; Lyricists: Joey Wee, Ma Keow Yuen, Eleanor Lin; Producer: Joey Wee, Ng Haosheng	22 Apr	

== Filmography ==
=== Variety show ===
Year	English title	Chinese title	Notes	Ref.
2013	90an Gerek! S2	-	Winner	
2023	Battle of the Buskers	游走的歌王	Winner (The ETC 闲杂人等)	

=== Music videos ===
Year	Title	Chinese title	Directed by	Ref.
2021	Can You Hear Me?	你听得到吗?	Kin Lee	
2025	Disrupt	混世	Shawn Tan	
2025	Tea Bone Nanyang	茶骨南洋	Kelvin Sng	
2026	Move Forward	往前走	Kelvin Sng	
