= 77 Heartbreaks =

2017 Hong Kong film by Herman Yau

- Poster
- Chinese: 原諒他77次
- Directed by: Herman Yau
- Screenplay by: Erica Li
- Based on: 77 Heartbreaks by Erica Li
- Produced by: Albert Lee; Jason Siu
- Starring: Charlene Choi; Pakho Chau; Michelle Wai; Anthony Wong; Kara Hui
- Cinematography: Mandy Ngai
- Edited by: Chung Wai-Chiu
- Music by: Mak Chun Hung
- Production companies: Emperor Motion Pictures; Stellar Pictures
- Release date: 15 June 2017
- Running time: 97 minutes
- Country: Hong Kong
- Language: Cantonese
- Box office: CN¥56.3 million (China)

77 Heartbreaks is a 2017 Hong Kong romantic drama film directed by Herman Yau. It was released in Hong Kong on 15 June 2017. The sequel 77 Heartwarmings, starring Charlene Choi, Pakho Chau and Mario Maurer was released in Hong Kong on 14 May 2021.

== Plot ==
Eva is frustrated by her boyfriend Adam's irresponsible habits. One evening when he is late for a date, she visits a small shop and browses a display of notebooks which appear to be designed with artistic and philosophical themes. She becomes attracted to a notebook called 77 Heartbreaks, which the shopkeeper explains is based on the number of times that a reasonable person can be expected to forgive someone for hurting them. Before long, Eva manages to fill the notebook completely with examples of Adam's annoying behavior. After Eva leaves, Adam eventually comes to understand why their relationship ended.

== Cast ==
- Charlene Choi
- Pakho Chau
- Michelle Wai
- Anthony Wong
- Kara Hui
- Lawrence Cheng
- Yumiko Cheng
- Candy Lo
- Rachel Lui

== Release ==
The film was released in Hong Kong on 15 June 2017 and in mainland China on 23 June 2017.

== Reception ==
The film has grossed CN¥56.3 million in mainland China.
