= Time and Tide (2000 film) =

2000 Hong Kong film by Tsui Hark

- Film poster

Chinese name
- Traditional Chinese: 順流逆流
- Simplified Chinese: 顺流逆流
Transcriptions
Standard Mandarin
- Hanyu Pinyin: Shùnliú nìliú
Yue: Cantonese
- Jyutping: Seon6 lau4 jik6 lau4
- Directed by: Tsui Hark
- Written by: Tsui Hark; Koan Hui
- Produced by: Tsui Hark
- Starring: Nicholas Tse; Wu Bai; Anthony Wong; Jun Kung; Candy Lo; Cathy Tsui
- Cinematography: Herman Yau; Ko Chiu-Lam
- Edited by: Marco Mak
- Music by: Tommy Wai
- Production companies: Columbia Pictures Film Production Asia; Film Workshop
- Distributed by: Columbia TriStar Film Distributors International
- Release dates: 5 September 2000 (Venice Film Festival); 19 October 2000 (Hong Kong)
- Running time: 116 minutes
- Country: Hong Kong
- Languages: Cantonese; Mandarin; Portuguese; English
- Box office: HK$ 4,465,047

Time and Tide is a 2000 Hong Kong action film directed, produced and co-written by Tsui Hark. The film is set in Hong Kong where a young man becomes a bodyguard and befriends a mercenary determined to begin life anew with the woman he just married. The two men find themselves working together to foil an assassination attempt which propels them toward confrontation with each other.

The film was re-written several times during production and post-production stages to accommodate director Tsui Hark's casting choices. The film was nominated for six Hong Kong Film Awards and received generally positive reviews from critics.

== Plot ==
During an alcohol-fueled night, drunk Tyler Yim impregnates inebriated Ah Jo, a lesbian undercover cop who had gone to the bar after a fight with her girlfriend. He joins an unlicensed bodyguard service led by Uncle Ji to earn money to give to Ah Jo, who wants nothing to do with him. Nearly nine months later, Tyler meets up with a butcher named Jack Chow and his pregnant wife, Ah Hui, who helps Tyler prevent her father's assassination at his birthday. Tyler tries to convince Jack to start a bodyguard service with him, but Jack turns him down.

A group of mercenaries from South America, known as the Angels, arrive and threaten Jack, who they call Juan, and their second in command Miguel Joventino offers him a chance to rejoin them if he kills his own father-in-law. Instead, Jack assassinates Pablo Santosa the leader of the Angels and evades Uncle Ji's bodyguards, knocking Tyler out in the process, and then steals a case full of cash from under their noses and escapes from the Angels. Jack drops his wife off at her father's mansion, giving her a key to a train station locker and telling her to go there when their child is born. Tyler is interrogated by the cops in connection with Jack, who accuse him of being connected to the killer because he saw him up close. Tyler tells them nothing.

Ah Jo tries unsuccessfully to parole Tyler, but Uncle Ji succeeds. Tyler thanks Ah Jo, and Uncle Ji locks him up in a transportation crate for a night before letting him out and getting Tyler to tell him about Jack. Uncle Ji gives Tyler more money, which Tyler tries to give to Ah Jo; he finds out that she has just gone into the hospital to give birth. Tyler heads off after Jack, and breaks into his apartment only to find the Angels and Jack have the place staked out.

A running gun battle ensues between Jack and the Angels as Tyler desperately tries to survive in Jack's apartment. Tyler ends up trapped in the apartment with the gas leaking and only manages to survive the explosion by hiding in the refrigerator, on the advice of Jack. Jack tricks the Angels into killing one of their own and distracting them long enough so he and Tyler can escape the rest. Miguel admits defeat and tries to call a truce with Jack, but then calls it off when one of the other Angels spots Jack's wife who arrives on the scene to see her former apartment burning.

The Angels take off after Ah Hui, following her to the train station. Tyler steals a taxi with his fake gun, giving his wallet to the driver, who promptly takes it to the cops. The police, still suspicious of Tyler from earlier, place him at the scene of the gun battle and explosion and send a Special Duties Unit team after him to the station. At the station, Tyler confronts Ah Hui with his fake gun and takes the money Jack stole from the Angels. Ah Hui goes into labor and one of the Angels shoots a cop, and then an innocent, while trying to shoot Tyler.

In the ensuing panic, Tyler drags Ah Hui off to safety and the SDU team arrives to deal with the situation. In response to Tyler's shouts that a pregnant woman has gone into labour, the SDU team send in team members disguised as medics to retrieve Ah Hui. The Angels open fire on them. Jack arrives on the scene just before the SDU team - now including Miguel and other Angels disguised as team members - starts a full invasion with tear gas. In the midst of the gases, Jack, the Angels, and the SDU team hunt one another, with SDU officers silently killed one by one by the disguised Angels, who loot tactical gear from the fallen officers, enabling them to kill even more unsuspecting officers. Tyler escapes with Ah Hui. In a confrontation on railroad tracks, Jack saves the life of a SDU team lieutenant by killing one of the Angels and surrenders to him.

The remaining Angels escape through a tunnel to a stadium full of concert-goers. Tyler has to hunker down in the tunnels as Ah Hui starts to give birth, and Jack convinces the SDU Lieutenant to let him go after Miguel in the stadium. Jack confronts Miguel in the catwalks above the concert goers and kills him with a grenade after a brutal hand-to-hand fight. Meanwhile, Tyler helps Ah Hui successfully give birth before the last of the Angels shows up. A fight ensues, and just as Tyler is about to lose, the last of the Angels gets shot dead by Ah Hui.

Jack is given a head-start to escape the police and visits with his wife, and Tyler recovers the money before going off to the hospital to see his child.

== Cast ==
- Nicholas Tse as Tyler Yim
- Wu Bai as Jack Chow/Juan
- Anthony Wong as Uncle Ji
- Jun Kung as Miguel Joventino (Credited as Joventino Couto Remotigue)
- Candy Lo as Ah Hui
- Cathy Tsui as Ah Jo
- Jack Kao as SDU Commander

== Production ==
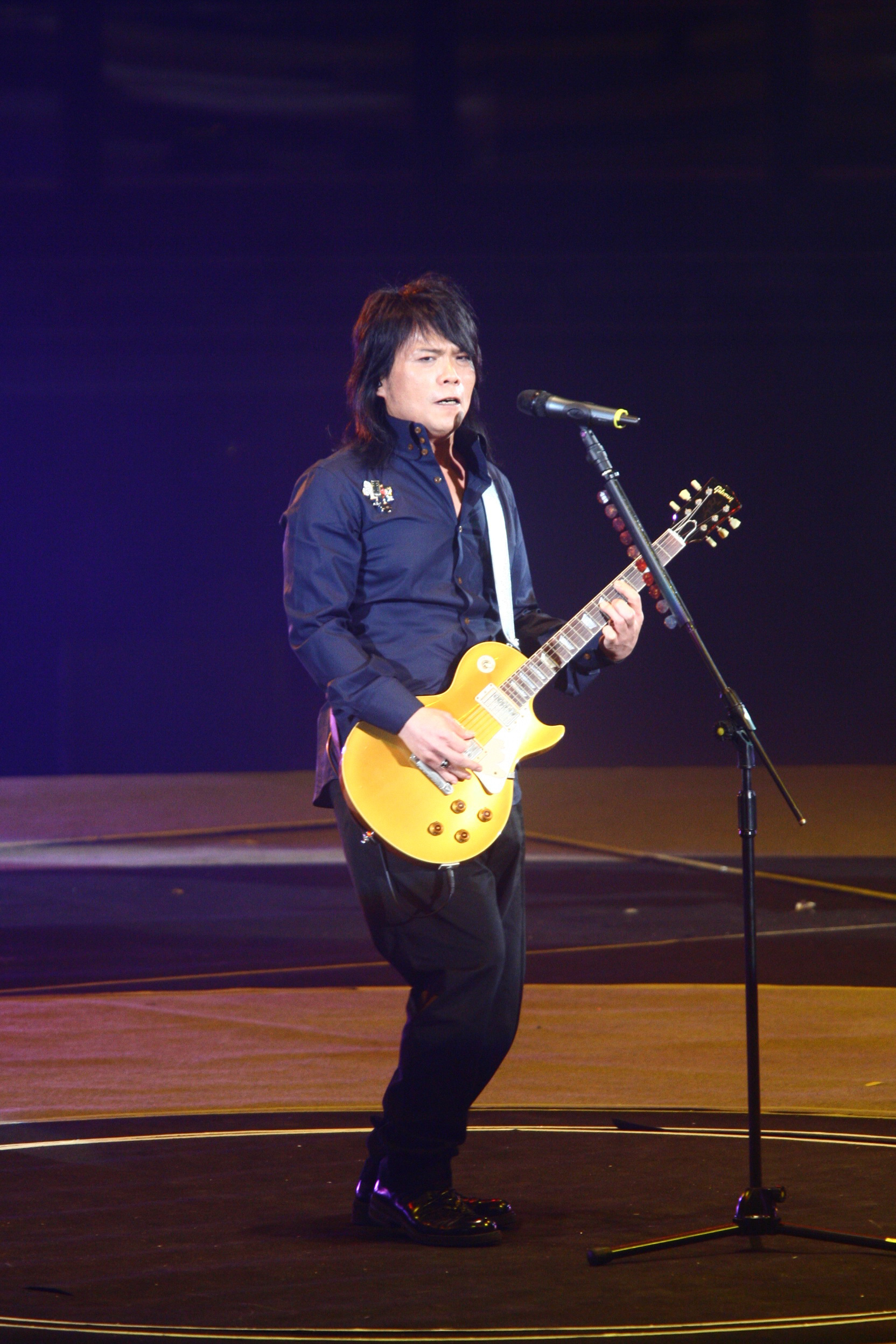
Director Tsui Hark re-wrote the character of Jack for Wu Bai (pictured) to match the music he made in his band China Blue.

Production on Time and Tide began in 1999. It was written by director Tsui Hark and Koan Hui. Hui and Hark had collaborated previously on the screenplay for The Blade. Actor Nicholas Tse opted out of appearing in the sequel to Gen-X Cops to be in Time and Tide. Tse announced that it would be his last action film as he desired to focus on his musical career. It was not his last action film as he starred in Wong Jing's My Schoolmate The Barbarian in 2001. After seeing Wu Bai in the Taiwanese film The Personals, Tsui offered Wu the role in Time and Tide. Wu's character was rewritten with him in mind by making him more of a sad loner to match the music he made with his band in China Blue. Cathy Tsui was cast as Ah Jo in the film. She found a scene involving her playing with a dog difficult as she was afraid of them. To make her more comfortable, she was sent to a dog farm where she played with dogs every day to become comfortable around them.

The film was radically altered in post-production. The original cut was over three hours long, which Tsui Hark considered to be too slow-paced. He reorganized the entire script including cutting many of Nicholas Tse and Anthony Wong Chau Sang's scenes, leaving Wu Bai's sequences as they were.

== Release ==
The film had its world premiere at the Venice Film Festival in 2000. The film was released in Hong Kong on 19 October 2000. The film made HK$4,465,047 in Hong Kong. The film was released on 4 May 2001 in the United States.

== Reception ==
At the Hong Kong Film Awards, the film received six nominations including Best New Performer and Best Supporting Actress (Candy Lo), Best Film Editing (Marco Mak), Best Action Choreography (Xiong Xin Xin), Best Original Film Score (Tommy Wai, Joventine Couto Remotigue), and Best Sound Design. The film received generally positive reviews from western critics. The film received 63% positive reviews at the film rating website Rotten Tomatoes.

== Bibliography ==
- Morton, Lisa (2009). The Cinema of Tsui Hark. McFarland. ISBN 978-0-7864-4460-1.
