= Paris Holiday (2015 film) =

2015 Chinese-Hong Kong film by James Yuen

- Poster
- 巴黎假期
- Directed by: James Yuen (阮世生)
- Written by: Wong Mei-Suet; Lo Yiu Fai; James Yuen
- Produced by: Alvin Lam; Javier Zhang
- Starring: Louis Koo; Amber Kuo
- Cinematography: Kenny Tse
- Production companies: Guangzhou Yingming Media; Universe Entertainment; Heyi Pictures; Beijing Jumo Pictures Investment; Sun Entertainment Culture; Poly Film Investment; Zhejiang Guanjian Pictures; Alpha Pictures (Hong Kong) Co., Ltd.
- Distributed by: Huanyu Zongheng Shiji Film Distribution (Beijing); Heyi Pictures; Dayinmu Film Distribution
- Release dates: 23 July 2015 (Hong Kong); 31 July 2015 (China)
- Running time: 112 minutes
- Countries: China; Hong Kong
- Languages: Cantonese; Mandarin; English
- Box office: CN¥17.9 million (China)

Paris Holiday (Chinese: 巴黎假期) is a 2015 romantic comedy film directed by James Yuen (阮世生). A Chinese-Hong Kong co-production, the film was released in Hong Kong on July 23 and in China on 31 July 2015.

== Plot ==
Two broken-hearted people meet as roommates and learn to let go of the past. They set out to find their soulmate in the beautiful romantic city, Paris.

== Cast ==
- Louis Koo
- Amber Kuo
- Jeremy Tsui
- Candy Liu
- Alex Fong
- Jing Hu
- Janice Man
- Anthony Chan
- Simon Lui
- Michelle Wai
- Carl Ng
- Carlos Chan

== Reception ==
The film earned CN¥17.912 million at the Chinese box office.
