= A Time of Love II =

2016 Hong Kong micro film

- Logo
- 愛情來的時候2
- Genre: Modern romance
- Created by: Hong Kong Television Broadcasts Limited
- Starring: Ep.1 Germany: Charmaine Sheh; Kenneth Ma; Ep.2 Taiwan: Priscilla Wong; Pakho Chau; Raymond Wong Ho-yin
- Opening theme: Ep.1: Love (愛) by Jinny Ng; Ep.2: A Hundred Years (百年不合) by Pakho Chau
- Composers: Ep.1: Alan Cheung; Ep.2: Robin Ch'i
- Country of origin: Hong Kong
- Original languages: Cantonese, Mandarin, German
- No. of episodes: 2

Production
- Executive producer: Catherine Tsang
- Producer: Chan Yuk-leung
- Production locations: Germany, Taiwan
- Running time: Ep.1: 45 minutes Ep.2: 85 minutes
- Production company: TVB

Original release
- Network: myTV SUPER
- Release: May 28 – June 4, 2016

A Time of Love II
- Traditional Chinese: 愛情來的時候2
Transcriptions
Standard Mandarin
- Hanyu Pinyin: ai qíng lái de shí hou er
Yue: Cantonese
- Jyutping: oi3 cing4 lei4 dik1 si4 hau6 ji6

A Time of Love 2 (Chinese: 愛情來的時候2; Jyutping: oi3 cing4 lei4 dik1 si4 hau6 ji6) is a 2016 Hong Kong romance, micro film, web drama produced by Chan Yuk-leung for TVB. The drama is the second installment of the A Time of Love series which first premiered on TVB Jade in 2014. Charmaine Sheh and Kenneth Ma are the only actors reprising their roles from the first series. Additional cast in the second series are Priscilla Wong, Pakho Chau, and Raymond Wong Ho-yin. The series is once again filmed in foreign countries, but unlike the first series, actors from other Pan Asian countries were not cast in the second series. Also different from the first series, the titles of each episode are not titled after themes or emotion but is simply titled by country. It is the first series to premier on TVB's new web-streaming online platform "myTV SUPER" on May 28, 2016. The series concluded on June 4, 2016 with a total of 2 episodes.

== Cast and Synopsis ==
=== Germany ===
- Theme Song: Love (愛) by Jinny Ng
- Starring:
  - Charmaine Sheh 佘詩曼 as Crystal
  - Kenneth Ma 馬國明 as Oscar

Crystal (Charmaine Sheh) and Oscar's (Kenneth Ma) love story continues. The two boss and subordinate are now dating. While on a business trip in Germany, the two have some private time to their personal relationship after their business meetings are done. However, Oscar begins to feel that as Crystal's subordinate, he is not worthy of her and cannot give her a happy future.

=== Taiwan ===
- Theme Song: A Hundred Years (百年不合) by Pakho Chau
- Starring:
  - Priscilla Wong 黃翠如 as Chin Ching 錢晴
  - Pakho Chau 周柏豪 as Dou Jun Fei 杜錦煇
  - Raymond Wong Ho-yin 黃浩然 as Leong Wing Hin 梁永廉 (Roger)

Ching (Priscilla Wong) dream is to marry a rich man because she believes people with money can solve all their problems with money. Her childhood friend Fei (Pakho Chau), who works at a dry cleaner shop often helps her by lending her expensive clothes from his customers, so she can attend high profile functions. After being hunted down by loan sharks whom she owes money, she starts living with Fei. At a party, Ching meets Roger (Raymond Wong Ho-yin), a rich businessman who takes an immediate liking towards her. Roger helps her repay her debt to the loan sharks and offers her a job at his company. It seems that Ching's dream has finally come true, but she begins to question whether money or love is more important.

== Development and production ==
- The second installment of the A Time of Love series was first announced on November 10, 2015 at the TVB Sales Presentation. The cast of the second installment was also revealed at the presentation ceremony.
- Charmaine Sheh and Kenneth Ma are the only two actors from the first series returning to the second series to reprise their roles. Their storyline from the first series is also the only one to continue from the first series.
- Filming took place from November 2015 till January 2016, on location in Germany and Taiwan. The Taiwan portion was filmed in a two-week span using a local Taiwan production crew in order to save budget. Also due to budget issues, actors from outside of Hong Kong could not be cast in the second series.

== See also ==
- A Time of Love
