= Rebellion (2009 film) =

2009 Hong Kong film by Herman Yau

- Film poster
- Traditional Chinese: 同門
- Simplified Chinese: 同门
- Hanyu Pinyin: Tóng Mén
- Jyutping: Tung4 Mun4
- Directed by: Herman Yau
- Written by: Herman Yau; Tin Yin-yee
- Produced by: Ng Kin-hung
- Starring: Shawn Yue; Elanne Kong; Chapman To
- Cinematography: Joe Chan; Dick Tung
- Edited by: Yau Chi-wai
- Music by: Paul Wong
- Production companies: Local Production; Universe Entertainment
- Distributed by: Universe Films Distribution Company
- Release dates: 8 October 2009 (Malaysia); 15 October 2009 (Hong Kong)
- Running time: 100 minutes
- Country: Hong Kong
- Language: Cantonese

Rebellion is a 2009 Hong Kong action crime thriller film directed by Herman Yau and starring Shawn Yue, Elanne Kong and Chapman To.

== Plot ==
Notorious of its dangerous nature, the South district (in Hong Kong island) is ruled by five gangs. Their leaders, Jimmy (Calvin Poon), Coffee (Paul Wong), Jupiter (Convoy Chan), Sand (Jun Kung) and Man Ching (Anson Leung) share equal power over the district. Overall everything remains serene, each gang owning separate territory and conflicts rare. However, as Jimmy's wife, Cheung Wah (Ada Choi), is successful in managing their thriving business, gradually Jimmy becomes the most affluent of the leaders. Adjacently, Man Ching faces the down turn of his empire, business shrinking in scale and power declining.

While the gangs are active in underground trade, the police are desperately looking forward to just one chance. Now it is time for them to take a strike. One night, when Jimmy is dining with seniors, a young man armed himself with a gun fires several big shots to his head. Knowing that, Cheung Wah stops all business dealing at once and appoints Po (Shawn Yue), Jimmy's right hand, to dig out the backhand but keep things quiet. Meanwhile, as Jimmy is still in a coma, dispute spreads over the five gangs, grabbing this shot to override others' territories. Violence sprawling over the East district, bloodshed is inevitable.

With efforts Po finally drags the killer out from Sand's place. Cheung Wah flies back from Taiwan right away to take the lead. Wandering in the still street in the midnight, Po can sense the weirdness around where policemen are missing out unusually. In fact, they are already stationed at the airport and are expecting Wah's back. The battle between justice and darkness is about to begin.

=== Alternate ending ===
The Blu-ray Disc release of Rebellion included an alternate ending, which showed Cheung Wah as an undercover cop, differing from that of the original ending, which showed Cheung Wah being arrested at the end of the film. It also featured a different opening than that of the DVD version. Other differences from the movie includes the complete replacement of Po as the undercover cop with Cheung Wah, extended gang-fight scenes, and an extension in the scene where Po tries to gain entrance to Sand's territories.

== Cast ==
- Shawn Yue as Po
- Elanne Kong as Ling
- Chapman To as Blackie
- Ron Heung as Chung
- Calvin Poon as Jimmy
- Ada Choi as Cheung Wah
- Convoy Chan as Jupiter
- Anson Leung as Man Ching
- Paul Wong as Coffee
- Jun Kung as Sand
- Ella Koon as Undercover cop
- Tommy Yuen as Chan Fai
- Parkman Wong as Police Senior Inspector
- Renee Dai as Lok
- Austin Wai as Mr. Tai
- Fung Hak-on as Uncle Man
- Bruce Law as Ducky

== Production ==
Originally intended as a 100-minute film Category III rating, it was cut down to 87 minute IIB rating so there would be more viewers to watch the film. The content that was cut were foul languages from Shawn Yue, Chapman To, Paul Wong, and Convoy Chan, as well as several sexual scenes.
