= Seven 2 One =

2009 Hong Kong film by Danny Pang

- Directed by: Danny Pang
- Written by: Danny Pang; Thomas Pang
- Produced by: Danny Pang; Alvin Lam
- Starring: Elanne Kong; Pakho Chow; William Chan; Stephanie Cheng; Siu Fay; James Ho; Gary Chiu; Chrissie Chau; Izz Tsu; Wylie Chiu; Jeremy Tsui; Katy Kung
- Cinematography: Chan Chi Ying
- Edited by: Curran Pang
- Production company: Universe Entertainment
- Distributed by: Universe Films Distribution Company
- Release date: 5 November 2009
- Running time: 85 minutes
- Country: Hong Kong
- Language: Cantonese

Seven 2 One (simplified Chinese: 关人7事; traditional Chinese: 關人7事 is a 2009 Hong Kong crime drama film directed by Danny Pang.

== Plot ==
Convenience store clerks Chrissie (Chrissie Chau) and Katy (Katy Kung) decide to get back at their sleazy manager Leo (Leo Chim) by having their friends pose as robbers and hold up the store, but events escalate out of control into murder. What started as an elaborate prank sets off a butterfly effect of crime, consequence, and desperation as more and more people get pulled into the mess.

== Cast ==
- Elanne Kong as Ling
- Pakho Chow as Pak-ho
- William Chan as William
- Stephanie Cheng
- Siu Fay
- James Ho
- Gary Chiu as Gary
- Chrissie Chau as Chrissie
- Izz Tsu
- Wylie Chiu as Wylie
- Jeremy Tsui as Cheng-hei
- Katy Kung as Katy
- Chan Chor-kiu as Carolyn
- Yung Cheng as Yung
- Leo Chim as Leo
- Terence Chui as Gut
- Ho Seung-him as Orange
- Mimi Chi Yan Kung
