= Janice Man =

Chinese actress (born 1988)

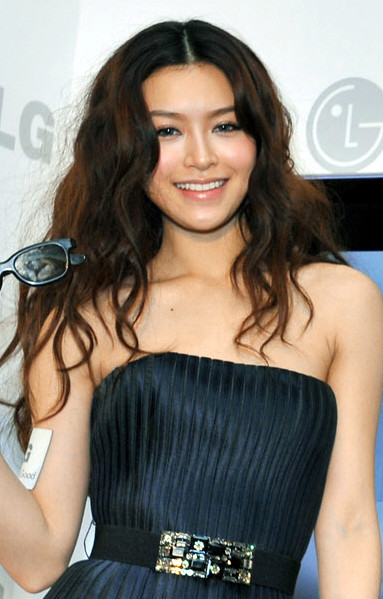
- Man in 2011
- Born: December 29, 1988 (age 37); British Hong Kong
- Occupations: Actress; model
- Years active: 2002–present
- Spouse: Carl Wu (m. 2019)
- Children: 1
- Modeling information
- Agency: Amusic (2009-2014); Sun Entertainment Culture Ltd (2014–present); JM Workshop Ltd (2014-present)

Chinese name
- Traditional Chinese: 文詠珊
- Simplified Chinese: 文咏珊
Transcriptions
Standard Mandarin
- Hanyu Pinyin: Wén Yǒngshān
Yue: Cantonese
- Jyutping: Man4 Wing6 Saan1

Janice Man (born December 29, 1988) is a Hong Kong actress and fashion model. She has played leading roles in several Chinese and Hong Kong films and television series, including Helios (2015), Cold War 2 (2016), Tribes and Empires: Storm of Prophecy (2017–2018), and Lost in the Stars (2022).

== Career ==
Man was discovered by talent seekers on the streets of Hong Kong, and became a professional model since the age of 14. Her modeling career took a sharp turn upwards in 2007 when she participated in television series such as 過渡青春 and movies like Love Is Not All Around. In 2009, August 13, it was announced she signed the contract with Leon Lai's star artist management, A-Music. She later appeared in Hong Kong's Asia Exhibit, Summer Pop Live in HK, and other live concerts. Her fame rose steadily in Asia as she was cast in leading roles in several important films and TV series in Hong Kong and China, working with famous co-stars such as Chow Yun-fat, Nick Cheung and Korean Movie Star, Kim Jae-wook. She was also featured in commercials for Opaque, Ipsa, I.T. Group, Bausch & Lomb, Adidas and Forever Mark. Her more recent accomplishments show a slow but steady turn to more film and TV work, with a critically acclaimed performance in Nightfall in 2012, starring along Simon Yam and Michael Wong.

In 2011, she won the Best Dressed award at the 30th Hong Kong Film Awards.

She was the spokesperson of Dr. Kits Hong Kong in 2011, SK-II Facial Treatment Essence from 2013–2014 and Adidas Hong Kong's Winter Jacket in 2015.

She is the spokesperson of Bausch & Lomb (Lacelle Series) (from 2011), IPSA and Forevermark (Diamond Ambassador).

== Filmography ==
=== Film ===
Year	Title	Role	Notes	Ref.
2007	Love Is Not All Around	Nik's ex-girlfriend		
2008	See You in YouTube	Janice		
2008	La Lingerie	Donut		
2009	Basic Love	June		
2010	Frozen	Monica		
2011	Punished	Daisy		
2011	Turning Point 2	Carmen		
2012	Nightfall	Eva / Zoe / Tsui		
2012	Passion Island	Jennes		
2013	Mortician			
2014	The Midnight After	Yuki		
2015	Tales of Mystery	Pei Wen		
2015	Helios	Zhang Yiyun		
2015	Paris Holiday	Nicole		
2016	Nessun Dorma	Jasmine Tsang		
2016	Cold War 2	Isabel Au		
2017	The Brink	Suet		
2021	Detective Chinatown 3	Kobayashi Anna's mother		
2021	Sheep Without a Shepherd 2	A Ling		
2022	New Kung Fu Cult Master 1	Zhao Min		
2022	New Kung Fu Cult Master 2	Zhao Min		
2022	Lost in the Stars	"Li Muzi" / Jane		
2023	Moscow Mission	Li Suzhen		

=== Television ===
Year	Title	Role	Notes	Ref.
2015	The Graduation Song	Wang Duoying		
2015	Legend of Zu Mountain	Zhou Qingyun		
2016	Shuttle Love Millennium	Wang Lin		
2017	Tribes and Empires: Storm of Prophecy	Pan Xi		
2018	The Great Adventurer Wesley	Fong Tin-nga		
2019	Nice to Meet You	Gao Jie		
2020	The Message	Li Ningyu		
2021	Demi-Gods and Semi-Devil	Wang Yuyan		
2021	Sword Snow Stride	Xu Weixiong	Guest role	
2024	Adventure behind the Bronze Door	Zhang Haixing		
2025	Mobius	An Lan		
