= Hong Kong Book Fair =

Hong Kong trade fair

- Genre: Printed products
- Years active: 1990–2019, 2021–
- Attendance: 1.02 million (2016)
- Patron: Hong Kong Trade Development Council
- Website: Official website

Hong Kong Book Fair
- Traditional Chinese: 香港書展
- Simplified Chinese: 香港书展
Transcriptions
Standard Mandarin
- Hanyu Pinyin: xiānggǎng shūzhǎn
Yue: Cantonese
- Yale Romanization: Hēung góng syū jín
- Jyutping: Hoeng^{1} gong^{2} syu^{1} zin^{2}

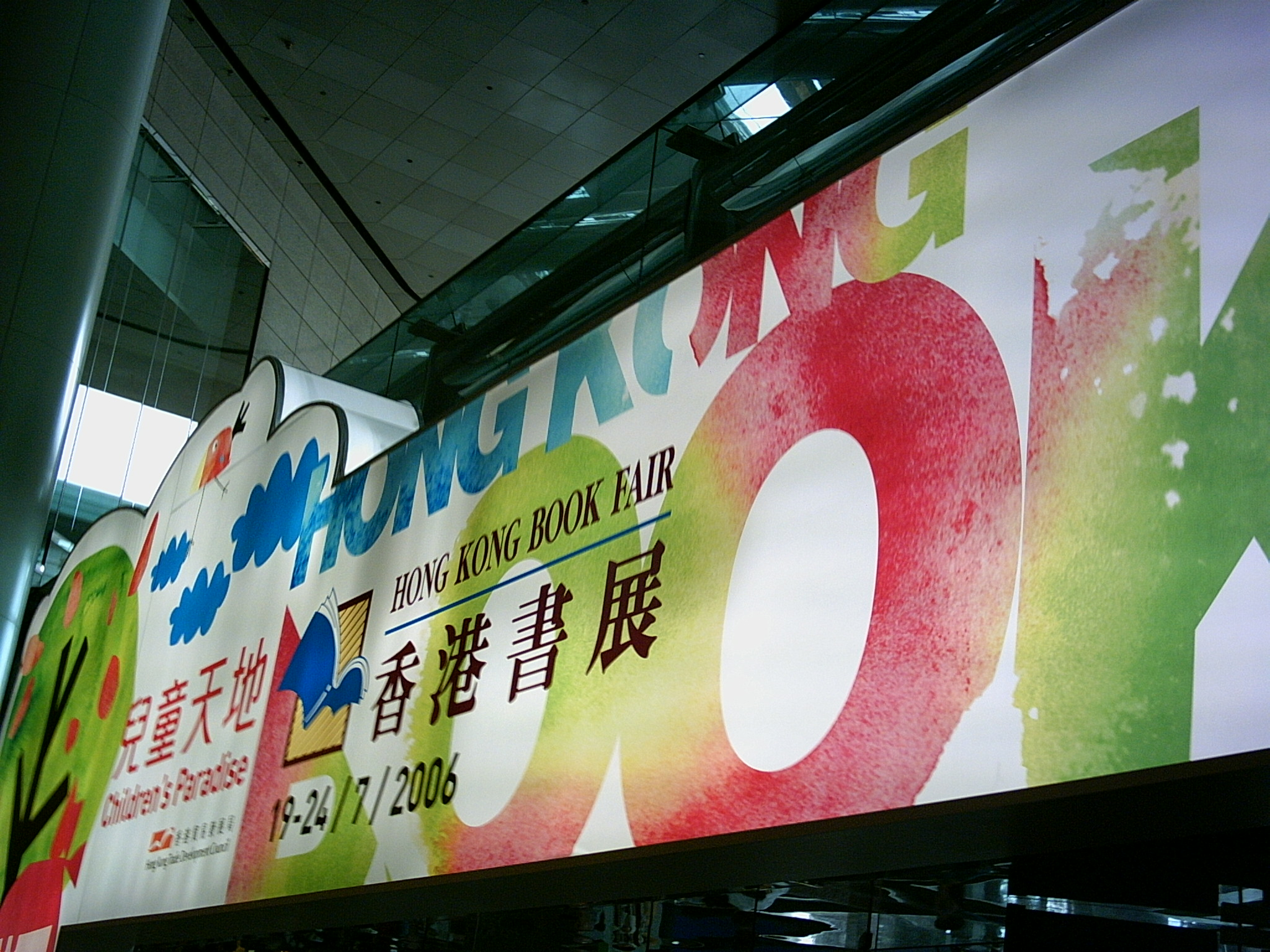
Hong Kong Book Fair banner

The Hong Kong Book Fair (Chinese: 香港書展) is a book fair organised by the Hong Kong Trade Development Council, held annually (usually in the middle of July) at the Hong Kong Convention and Exhibition Centre, selling and exhibiting books, printed matter, stationery, printing, compact discs and other multimedia publishing.

The annual exhibition at the City Hall organised by the Hong Kong Publishing Federation could be regarded as the predecessor of the Hong Kong Book Fair. The First Hong Kong Book Fair was held in 1990. The Fair has become an annual major event in Hong Kong with the number of visitors reaching new high every year. The organiser, the HKTDC, has always been striving to promote local reading culture. Apart from extensively inviting the public to the Fair to visit and buy books, it also spares no effort in organising diversified cultural activities during the Book Fair period with a view to enhance the contents and quality of the Fair.

== History ==
=== Origin ===
Organized by the TDC before the first Hong Kong Book Fair, the Hong Kong publishers on their own in the Hong Kong City Hall held book fair. 1989 after the completion of the first Convention and Exhibition Centre, the publishing industry felt the need to develop the Book Fair a larger, more professional, better service platform for the industry, thus requiring the TDC to assist the industry sponsored book fair. The first book fair was held in 1990.

=== 2003 ===
Book Fair 2003, an additional directory search online book would not only help readers find books, but also became an online copyright trading centre, part of the book fair extended to break the copyright transactions, the manner of restrictions. This year's book fair run from 29 July to 3 August, and also included an art pavilion where art lovers could attend workshops of their interest.

=== 2004 ===
2004 International Cultural Village Book Fair trial, participating countries, France and Singapore. This year's book fair run from 21 July to 26 and 367 publishers participated in the exhibition.

=== 2011 ===
The 22nd edition of the HKTDC Hong Kong Book Fair was held from 20 to 26 July under the theme of "Reading the World, Reading as Self-discovery". More than 520 exhibitors from 24 countries and regions took part at the fair The attendance at the fair was about three per cent higher than last year. The figure included some 15,000 tourists, 15 per cent more than 2010 and largely from mainland China, Macau and Taiwan.

=== 2012 ===
"Reading the World, We Read therefore We Know" was the theme for this year's book fair which started from 18 to 24 July at the Hong Kong Convention and Exhibition Centre. 17 renowned writers from mainland China, Hong Kong, Malaysia, Taiwan and the United States attended the Renowned Writers Seminar Series.

=== 2013 ===
The 24th Hong Kong Book Fair started from 17 to 23 July this year under the theme of “Reading the World – Reading for a Better World.” The fair featured a number of zones, including its largest English Avenue to date, Teens’ World and e-Books and e-Learning Resources. There, the Sino United Publishing was launching SuperBookcity.com, allowing readers to search and purchase millions of printed books and e-books. E-book vending machines were also being showcased for the first time.

=== 2014 ===
The 25th HKTDC Hong Kong Book Fair opened from 16 to 22 July. Carrie Lam Cheng Yuet-ngor, the then Hong Kong SAR Government's Chief Secretary for Administration, together with HKTDC Executive Director Fred Lam, were the officiating guests for the fair's Opening Ceremony on 16 July. The fair attracted more than 1.01 million visitors.

=== 2016 ===
The Hong Kong Book Fair was held from 20 to 26 July at HKCEC, Wan Chai. The theme for this year was Chinese Martial Arts Literature and to promote this, Hong Kong Book Fair organised a series of seminars for visitors to explore Chinese martial arts literature across different times. Also a dedicated zone Chinese Martial Arts Literature set up in the Art Gallery to introduce classic martial arts novelists. Martial arts literature has been playing a prominent role in Hong Kong's literary world, cultivating a vast quantity of Martial arts masterpieces over the years. The genre gained continual popularity in Hong Kong during the 1950s-60s, when Chinese martial arts novels started to be serialized on newspapers. Such serial stories were so popular that they were re-published as printed novels. Up to now, these martial arts novels have stood the test of time, and are still appealing to a mass audience. Many of the stories have been translated into different languages, and even transformed into comics, TV series, movies or computer games, providing a wide range of channels for the world to understand the essence of Chinese culture.

=== 2017 ===
The Hong Kong Book Fair was held from 19 to 25 July at HKCEC, Wan Chai. Under the theme of "Reading the World ･ People, Places, Passions". This year's event attracted about 670 exhibitors from 37 countries and regions; and more than 320 cultural activities were held during the fair period, with the aim to encourage readers to travel around the world and broaden their horizons. Nearly one million people visited this year book fair.

=== 2018 ===
The Hong Kong Book Fair was held on 18–24 July at HKCEC, Wan Chai. The Gross Exhibition Space was 48,887 M². The theme of the year was Romance Literature. Chinese and foreign authors of all times had put their words of love into classic literature, touching the hearts of many readers throughout the years. This year's Book Fair attracted 680 exhibitors from 39 countries and regions.

=== 2019 ===
The Hong Kong Book Fair was held on 17–23 July at HKCEC, Wanchai. The theme for the fair is "Sci-Fi and Mystery", offering a good opportunity for readers to appreciate excellent sci-fi and mystery literature.

=== 2020 ===
Due to the COVID-19 pandemic, HKTDC has decided to reschedule the book fair that was supposed to be held from 15 to 21 July 2020. It was further announced in August that the book fair will be held from 16 to 22 December. It was officially cancelled on 23 November by the organizer.

== Information of previous fair ==
Session	Year	Theme	Attendance	Remarks
1	1990		200,000	
13	2002		430,000	
14	2003		430,000	Included an Art Pavilion where workshops were held
15	2004		500,000	
16	2005		640,000	The first time that introduction of tickets for admission after 6 pm, which at 22:00 on the 1st Free admission
17	2006		680,000	Admission tickets again
18	2007	Reading of Hong Kong	760,000	Extended to 7 days, which is the first time to set up the theme.
19	2008	Reading the world‧To the world	830,000	
20	2009	Multiculturalism and originality‧20th anniversary	900,000	8 per cent increase over last year
21	2010	From Hong Kong to the world-care the society．care the global	920,000	
23	2011	Reading the world．Reading as self-discovery	950,000	The highest attendance
24	2013	Reading the World-Reading for a Better World	980,000	The highest attendance
25	2014		1,010,000	The highest attendance
26	2015	Reading the World ･ Love at First Book		
27	2016	Reading the World ･ Heroism and Romance of the Chinese Martial World	1,020,000	Record of nearly 1.02 million attended HK Book Fair
28	2017	Reading the World ･ People, Places, Passions	~1,000,000	Nearly one million visited
29	2018	Romance Literature	1,040,000	Attracted a record of 1.04 million visitors
30	2019	Sci-Fi and Mystery	980,000	The first time since 2014 that number of visitors dropped below one million mark.
31	2020			
32	2021			
33	2022	Reading the World: Stories of Hong Kong	850,000	Number of attendees increased by 20,000 from last year
