= Jun Kung =

Chinese musician and producer (born 1977)

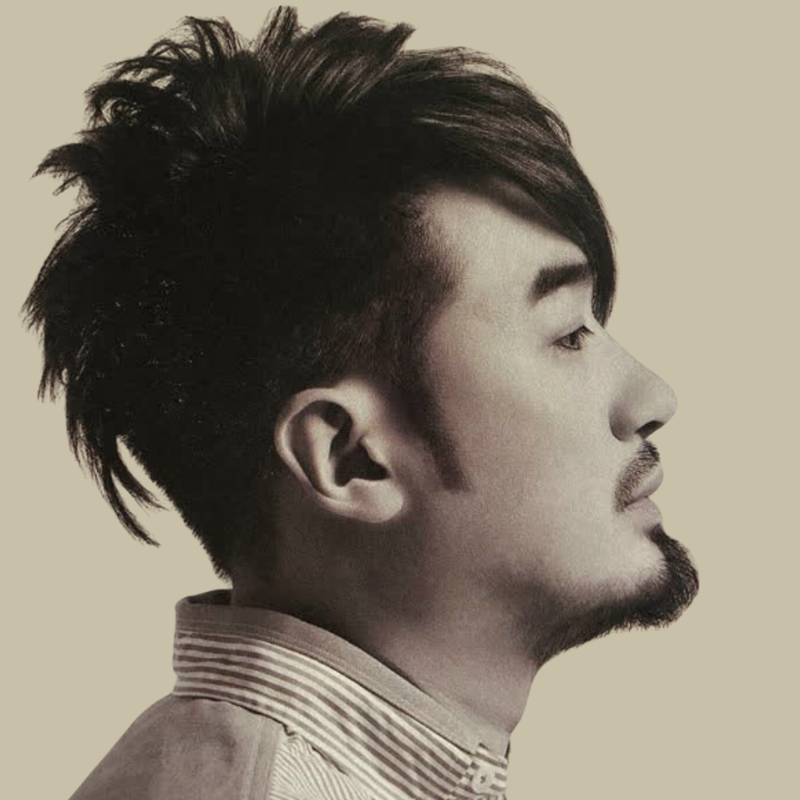
- Kung in 2010
- Born: August 18, 1977 (age 49); British Hong Kong
- Occupations: Musician; producer; songwriter; actor
- Musical career
- Origin: Portuguese, Filipino, Chinese, Japanese
- Label: Greyscale Group
- Website: Jun's Blog

Jun Kung (Chinese: 恭碩良; pinyin: Gōng Shuòliáng; born August 18, 1977), also known as Joventino Couto Remotigue, is a Hong Kong drummer, singer-songwriter, producer, actor, and multi-instrumentalist.

== Discography ==
Order	Album Information
1st	Here and Now (EP): Release Date: June 1999
2nd	No Where Man (LP): Release Date: July 2001
3rd	Ginja Rock (EP): Release Date: 2005
4th	JUN K (LP): Release Date: September 2010; Label: Revolution Talent
5th	Here to Stay (Digital singles): Release Date: November 2010; Label: Revolution Talent
6th	Playback Is A Bitch (LP): Release Date: June 2012; Label: Revolution Talent / East Asia Media
7th	Past Future Present Tense (LP): Release Date: March 2015; Label: The Sun Entertainment
8th	原諒愛 (Digital singles): Release Date: July 2016; Label: The Sun Entertainment
9th	修羅界 (Digital singles): Release Date: September 2016; Label: The Sun Entertainment
10th	愛後記 (Digital singles): Release Date: February 2017; Label: The Sun Entertainment
11th	We All Fall Down (Digital singles): Release Date: October 2017; Label: The Sun Entertainment
12th	Beautiful Fools (Digital singles): Release Date: June 2018; Label: The Sun Entertainment
13th	Supermarket Music Vol.1 超級市場伴奏 (EP): Release Date: August 2019; Label: The Sun Entertainment
14th	Help Is On the Way (Roni Size Remix) (Digital singles): Release Date: April 2020; Label: LABEL K
15th	78 (Digital singles): Release Date: April 2021; Label: LABEL K

== Filmography ==
Year	Title	Role	Director
2001	Time and Tide 順流逆流	Miguel Joventino	Tsui Hark
2006	The Heavenly Kings 四大天王	Jun Kung	Daniel Wu
2009	Rebellion 同門	Sandpaper	Herman Yau
2011	Punished 報應		Law Wing Cheong
2011	Lan Kwai Fong		
2012	Nightfall	Wong's former acquaintance	
2015	Triumph in the Skies	TM's manager	
2015	SPL II: A Time For Consequences		
