= Elanne Kong =

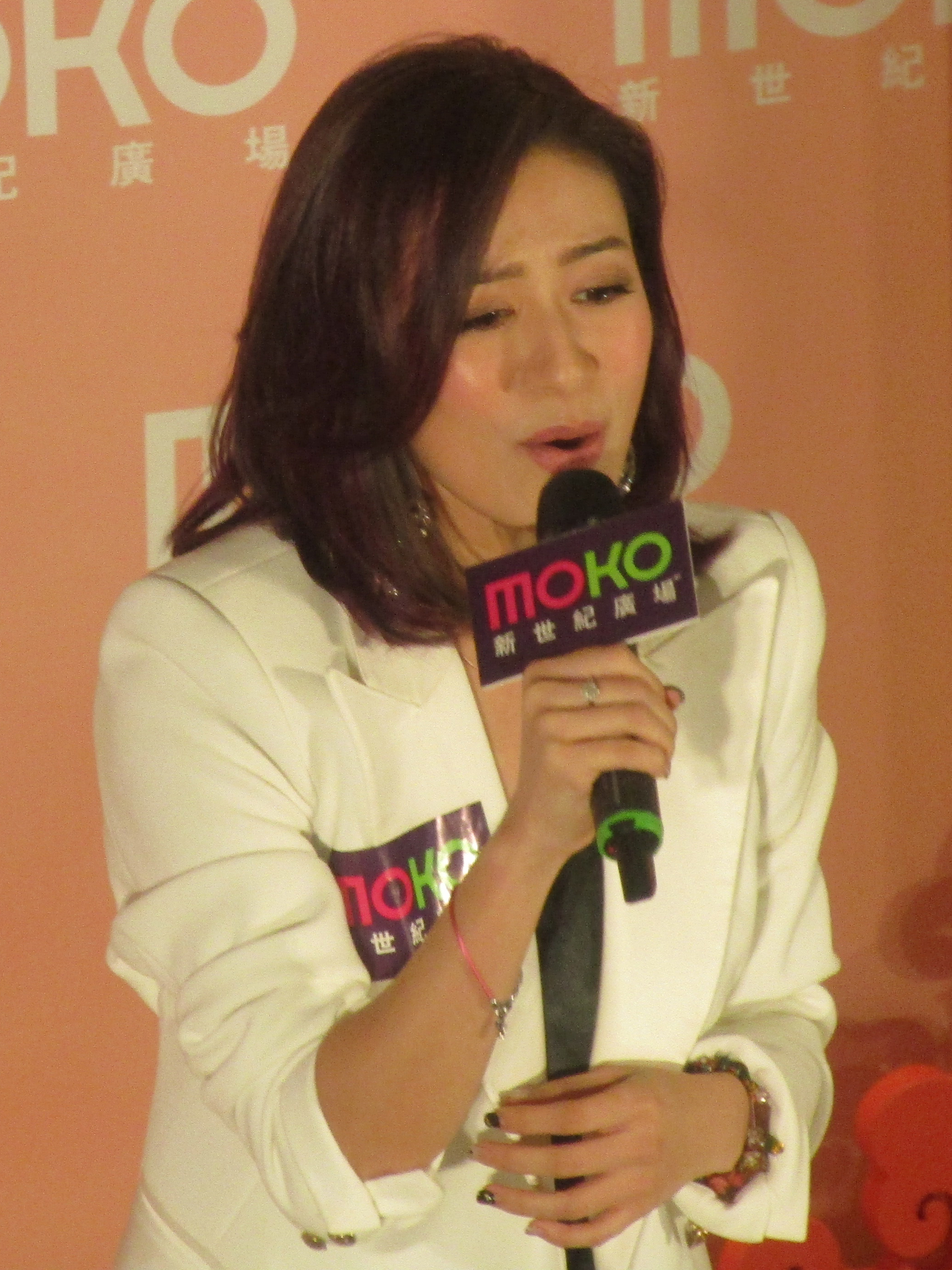
- Kong in 2016
- Born: Jiang Ling (江玲); 30 September 1987 (age 38); Xiamen, Fujian, China
- Occupations: Actress; singer
- Years active: 2007–present

Chinese name
- Traditional Chinese: 江若琳
Transcriptions
Standard Mandarin
- Hanyu Pinyin: Jiāng Ruòlín
Yue: Cantonese
- Jyutping: Gong1 Joek6 Lam4

Alternative Chinese name
- Traditional Chinese: 江伊晴
Transcriptions
Standard Mandarin
- Hanyu Pinyin: Jiāng Yī qíng
Yue: Cantonese
- Jyutping: Gong1 Ji1 Cing4
- Musical career
- Also known as: Elanne Kwong, Elanne Ling, Elanne Kwong Yeuk-lam, Elanne Kwong Yee-ching
- Origin: Hong Kong
- Labels: Stars Shine International (2011–2013); Calcarries Management (2020–present)

Elanne Kong (Chinese: 江若琳, born 30 September 1987) is a Hong Kong actress and singer. On 15 May 2020, she announced that she was changing her stage name from Elanne Kwong Yeuk-lam (江若琳) to Elanne Kwong Yee-ching (江伊晴). On 11 September 2021, she announced that she changed to her former stage name Elanne Kwong Yeuk-lam (江若琳) again. On 7 June 2023, she gave birth her first child, is a son.

== Discography ==
- Innocent (EP) (2007)
- Shining (Debut Album) (2008)
- Show You (EP) (2009)
- Elanne Kwong (EP) (2011)
- 天空之樹 (2012)

== Filmography ==
=== TV series ===
Year	Title	Role	Awards	Notes
2007	Wing Chun			
2009	E.U.	Kong Yau-yau	Nominated – TVB Award for Best Supporting Actress	
2009	Those Days in an Epoch	Zhou Pei-wen		aka Invisible Target
2011	Relic of an Emissary	Princess Wing Yeung		
2011	Star City			
2012	Mulan	Hua Mulan		

=== Film ===
Year	Title	Role	Notes
2005	A Side, B Side, Sea Side	Chan Tim	
2007	House of Mahjong	Ling	
2007	Invisible Target	Leung Hoi-lam	
2008	See You In YouTube	Ling	
2008	Scare 2 Die	Luk Wing	
2008	Happy Funeral	Ah Ji	
2009	Basic Love	Ling	
2009	Rebellion	Ling	
2009	Seven 2 One	Ling	
2010	The Child's Eye	Ling	
2010	City Under Siege		
2011	Summer Love		
2011	72 Heroes		
2011	The Wedding Diary *hero: Ah Niu		
2012	Love Lifting		Nominated – Hong Kong Film Award for Best Actress
2012	The Fairy Tale Killer		
2013	The Wedding Diary 2 * Hero: Ah Niu		
2013	The White Storm	Angela	
2018	Come On Teacher		
2018	Uta Is Not a Stray Dog		

== Awards and nominations ==
Award	Year	Nominee / Work	Category	Result	Ref.
Hong Kong Film Award	2012	Love Lifting	Best Actress	Nominated	

- (2010) Next Magazine TV Award – Most Promising Female Artiste
