= The White Storm (film series) =

Hong Kong action film series

- Blu-ray disc cover of the box set containing the first two films
- Traditional Chinese: 掃毒系列
- Simplified Chinese: 扫毒系列
- Literal meaning: Drug Sweep
- Hanyu Pinyin: Sǎo Dú Xì Liè
- Jyutping: Sou3 Deok6 Hai6 Lit6
- Directed by: Benny Chan; Herman Yau
- Written by: Benny Chan; Manfred Wong; Ram Ling; Wong Chun; Tam Wai-ching; Herman Yau; Erica Li; Eric Lee
- Produced by: Andy Lau; Benny Chan; Alvin Lam; Wendy Wong; Stephen Lam; Esther Koo; Wong Chun-kei
- Starring: Andy Lau; Aaron Kwok; Louis Koo; Sean Lau; Nick Cheung
- Cinematography: Anthony Pun; Chan Kwok-Hung; Joe Chan
- Edited by: Yau Chi-wai; Azrael Chung
- Music by: Nicolas Errèra; Mak Chun Hung
- Production companies: Universe Entertainment; Sil-Metropole Organisation; Bona Film Group; Guangdong Sublime Media; Focus Films; Sun Entertainment Culture; Yinming Culture Communication; Hero Films; Golala Investment; Lian Ray Pictures; AMDT Digital Media
- Distributed by: Universe Films Distribution (Hong Kong, Worldwide); Gala Film Distribution (Hong Kong)
- Release dates: 5 December 2013 (1); 16 July 2019 (2); 27 July 2023 (3)
- Running time: 234 minutes
- Country: Hong Kong
- Language: Cantonese
- Budget: US$41 million
- Box office: US$244.7 million

The White Storm is a Hong Kong action film series of three films. The films are unrelated to one another in storyline but feature common central themes involving drug trafficking, brotherhood and the Narcotics Bureau of the Hong Kong Police Force. The first film, The White Storm, written and directed by Benny Chan and starring Sean Lau, Louis Koo and Nick Cheung was released in 2013. The second film, The White Storm 2: Drug Lords, written and directed by Herman Yau and starring Andy Lau and Koo was released in 2019. The third film, The White Storm 3: Heaven or Hell also written and directed by Yau and starring Koo, Sean Lau and Aaron Kwok was released on 27 July 2023.

== Films ==
Film	HK release date	Director(s)	Screenwriter(s)	Producer(s)
The White Storm	5 December 2013	Benny Chan	Benny Chan; Manfred Wong; Ram Ling; Wong Chun; Tam Wai-ching	Benny Chan; Alvin Lam; Wendy Wong; Stephen Lam
The White Storm 2: Drug Lords	16 July 2019	Herman Yau	Herman Yau; Erica Lee; Eric Lee	Andy Lau; Alvin Lam; Esther Koo; Wong Chun-kei
The White Storm 3: Heaven or Hell	27 July 2023	Herman Yau	Herman Yau	TBA

=== The White Storm (2013) ===
The White Storm is the first film in the series, which tells the story of three childhood friends Ma Ho-tin, So Kin-chow and Cheung Chi-wai who are police officers of the Narcotics Bureau of the Hong Kong Police Force, with Kin-chow going undercover to infiltrate drug dealers while Ho-tin and Chi-wai back him up. The trio has solved numerous cases over the years. After of years of investigation, they finally have the chance to crack down Thai drug lord Eight-Faced Buddha's den. During their face-off, the trio were ambushed by the Eight-Faced Buddha, who captures Kin-chow and Chi-wai while Ho-tin holds Eight-Faced Buddha's daughter, Mina, hostage and Ho-tin is forced to choose only one of his friends to leave with him alive.

=== The White Storm 2: Drug Lords (2019) ===
The White Storm 2: Drug Lords is a thematic sequel in-title-only to The White Storm. In the quadripartite drug market in Hong Kong, drug dealer Jizo (Louis Koo) gradually expands in collaboration with some Mexican drug lords across the border, followed by a chain of dog-eat-dog events which shock and bring the whole trade on high alert. On the other hand, Yu Shun-tin (Andy Lau), a former triad member who is now a financial tycoon, is offering a bounty to eliminate the number one drug dealer in Hong Kong, which causes a stir in society. Police officer Fung (Michael Miu) intends to arrest Jizo, but is now responsible for protecting Jizo instead due to the bounty. A final battle has broken out between the two tycoons who were once lesser-known brothers from the same triad.

=== The White Storm 3: Heaven or Hell (2023) ===
The White Storm 3: Heaven or Hell is a thematic sequel in-title-only to The White Storm 2: Drug Lords. Undercover police officer Cheung Kin-hang has been infiltrating drug lord Hong So-chai's cartel. One time during an accident, another undercover officer Au Chi-yuen also earns the trust of both Cheung and Hong and the three of them form a brotherly bond. When Hong's narcotics businesses in Hong Kong were busted by the police, he flees to the Golden Triangle with Cheung and Au. However, by chance he receives a tip-off that an undercover cop is secretly hiding around him.

== Cast and crew ==
=== Cast ===
Cast	The White Storm (2013)	The White Storm 2: Drug Lords (2019)	The White Storm 3: Heaven or Hell (2023)
Louis Koo	So Kin-chow	Fung Chun-kwok (Jizo)	Au Chi-yuen
Sean Lau	Ma Ho-tin	✗	Hong So-chai
Nick Cheung	Cheung Chi-wai	✗	✗
Andy Lau	✗	Yu Shun-tin	✗
Aaron Kwok	✗	✗	Cheung Kin-hang
Yuan Quan	Chloe Yuan	✗	✗
Lo Hoi-pang	Eight-Faced Buddha	✗	✗
Berg Ng	Wong Shun-yik	✗	✗
Ken Lo	Bobby	✗	✗
Treechada Petcharat	Mina Wei	✗	✗
Law Lan	Chi-wai's mother	✗	✗
Marc Ma	Dune Kun	✗	✗
Xing Yu	Kanit	✗	✗
Lee Siu-kei	Kei	✗	✗
Vithaya Pansringarm	Mr. Choowit	✗	✗
Michael Miu	✗	Lam Ching-fung	✗
Karena Lam	✗	Michelle Chow	✗
Kent Cheng	✗	Yu Nam	✗
Gordon Lam	✗	Secretary for Justice of Hong Kong	✗
Chrissie Chau	✗	May Chan	✗
Cherrie Ying	✗	Fong Yau-ka	✗
Michelle Wai	✗	Apple Tse	✗
Jun Kung	✗	Cho Tai	✗
MC Jin	✗	Cho Ping	✗
Elena Kong	✗	Cheung Ching	✗
Lau Kong	✗	Cheung Chi-ming	✗
Halina Tam	✗	Siu Ka-man	✗
Gill Mohindepaul Singh	✗	Abbas Abraham	✗
Philippe Joly	✗	Josef	✗
Gallen Lo	✗	✗	Undisclosed role
Tse Kwan-ho	✗	✗	Undisclosed role
Alex Fong	✗	✗	Undisclosed role
Power Chan	✗	✗	Undisclosed role
Timmy Hung	✗	✗	Undisclosed role
Wilfred Lau	✗	✗	Undisclosed role
Lam Suet	✗	✗	Undisclosed role
Kumer So	✗	✗	Undisclosed role
James Kazama	✗	✗	Undisclosed role

=== Additional crew ===
Film	Crew/Detail					
Film	Composer(s)	Cinematographer	Editor(s)	Production companies	Distributing company	Running time
The White Storm	Nicolas Errèra	Anthony Pun; Chan Kwok-Hung	Yau Chi-wai	Universe Entertainment; Sun Entertainment Culture Limited; Bona International Film Group; Sil-Metropole Organisation; Golala Investment Limited	Universe Films Distribution (Hong Kong, Worldwide); Gala Film Distribution (Hong Kong)	134 minutes
The White Storm 2: Drug Lords	Mak Chun Hung	Joe Chan	Azrael Chung	Universe Entertainment; Sil-Metropole Organisation; Guangdong Sublime Media; Focus Films; Sun Entertainment Culture; Yinming Culture Communication; Hero Films	Universe Films Distribution (Hong Kong, Worldwide); Gala Film Distribution (Hong Kong)	100 minutes
The White Storm 3: Heaven or Hell	TBA	TBA	TBA	Universe Entertainment; Hero Films; Lian Ray Pictures; AMDT Digital Media; Sun Entertainment Culture	Universe Films Distribution (Hong Kong, Worldwide); Gala Film Distribution (Hong Kong)	TBA

== Music ==
The score for The White Storm was composed, orchestrated, conducted and produced by Nicolas Errèra while the theme song, Tacit for Life (心照一生) was composed, arranged and performed by RubberBand, who also co-produced the song it with Benny Chan and co-wrote the lyrics with Tim Lui. The film's insert theme is a cover of the 1978 song, Swear to Enter the Blade Mountain (誓要入刀山), composed by Joseph Koo, with lyrics written by James Wong and performed by Adam Cheng. The cover version was re-arranged and performed by RubberBand. (Note: End credits of The White Storm)

The score for The White Storm 2: Drug Lords was composed by Mak Chun Hung while the theme song, Brotherhood (兄弟不懷疑) was composed and arranged by Jacky Cai with lyrics written by Andy Lau, who also co-performed the song with Louis Koo, while Jacky Chan produced the song. The film's insert theme song, Wayward One was composed and performed by Jillian Rae, who also wrote the lyrics. (Note: End credits of The White Storm 2: Drug Lords)

== Reception ==
The first two films were box office successes while receiving mixed reviews. The first film received seven nominations at the 33rd Hong Kong Film Awards while the second film received four nominations at the 39th Hong Kong Film Awards and won the Best Visual Effects award. The second film was also selected as the Hong Kong entry for the Best International Feature Film at the 92nd Academy Awards, but did not make it to the final nomination.

=== Box office performance ===
Film	Release date	Hong Kong box office gross	Worldwide box office gross	Budget	Reference
The White Storm	5 December 2013	HK$31,938,819	US$44,670,277	US$16,000,000	
The White Storm 2: Drug Lords	16 July 2019	HK$24,813,706	US$200,000,000	US$25,000,000	
The White Storm 3: Heaven or Hell	27 July 2023	TBA	TBA	TBA	TBA
Total		HK$56,752,525	US$244,670,277	US$41,000,000	

=== Critical response ===
Film	Rotten Tomatoes	Metacritic
The White Storm	N/A (2 reviews)	—N/a
The White Storm 2: Drug Lords	57% (7 reviews)	—N/a
The White Storm 3: Heaven or Hell	TBA	TBA
