= The White Storm 3: Heaven or Hell =

2023 Hong Kong film by Herman Yau

- Theatrical release poster
- Traditional Chinese: 掃毒3人在天涯
- Simplified Chinese: 扫毒3人在天涯
- Hanyu Pinyin: Sǎo Dú Sān Rén Zài Tiān Yá
- Jyutping: Sou3 Deok6 Saam1 Jan4 Zoi6 Tin1 Ngaai4
- Directed by: Herman Yau
- Written by: Herman Yau
- Produced by: Alex Dong; Alvin Lam
- Starring: Aaron Kwok; Louis Koo; Sean Lau
- Cinematography: Mandy Ngai
- Edited by: Azrael Chung
- Music by: Mak Chun Hung
- Production companies: Universe Entertainment; AMTD Digital; Hero Films; Lian Ray Pictures; Sun Entertainment Culture
- Distributed by: Universe Films Distribution
- Release date: 27 July 2023
- Running time: 125 minutes
- Country: Hong Kong
- Language: Cantonese
- Budget: HK$300 million
- Box office: HK$10,503,821

The White Storm 3: Heaven or Hell is a 2023 Hong Kong action film directed by Herman Yau and starring Aaron Kwok, Louis Koo and Sean Lau. The film is a thematic sequel to the 2019 film The White Storm 2: Drug Lords, featuring a new storyline and characters.

The film was announced in March 2020, with production slated to begin in July the same year. After going through several delays due to the COVID-19 pandemic, production for the film began in June 2021 and ended in October 2021. It was released on 27 July 2023.

== Plot ==
Undercover police officer Cheung Kin-hang (Aaron Kwok) has been infiltrating drug lord Hong So-chai's (Sean Lau) cartel. One time during an accident, another undercover officer Au Chi-yuen (Louis Koo) also earns the trust of both Cheung and Hong and the three of them form a brotherly bond. When Hong's narcotics businesses in Hong Kong were busted by the police, Hong So-chai flees to the Golden Triangle with a wounded Cheung from friendly fire. Hong So-chai attempts to get his foot into the Golden Triangle's drug business with Cheung, isolated from the outside world. Au races against time to get Cheung out of Thailand before Cheung's cover is blown.

== Cast ==
- Aaron Kwok as Cheung Kin-hang (張建行), an undercover police officer of the Hong Kong Police Force's Narcotics Bureau.
- Louis Koo as Au Chi-yuen (歐志遠), senior inspector of the Narcotics Bureau and Cheung's longtime friend with whom he worked with as an undercover.
- Sean Lau as Hong So-chai (康素差), a Thai-Chinese drug lord.
- Yang Caiyu as Noon
- Gallen Lo as Tai Kam-wing (戴金榮), a military commander in-chief and major drug lord in Thailand. (special appearance)
- Tse Kwan-ho as Mee Noi (米諾), Hong's business partner who is a drug dealer in Thailand.
- Alex Fong as Chan Sau-yan (陳守仁), superintendent of the Narcotics Bureau who is Cheung and Au's superior officer.
- Power Chan as So Chi-leung (蘇子良), staff officer of Tai's military.
- Timmy Hung as Johnny, a Narcotics Bureau officer.
- Wilfred Lau as Sai (阿細), Hong's underling.
- Lam Suet as Fat Hung (肥雄), a triad whom Au infiltrated when he was undercover.
- Kumer So
- James Kazama
- Sun Heyi

== Production ==
In March 2020, Universe Entertainment chairman Daneil Lam announced a sequel to the 2019 film, The White Storm 2: Drug Lords was being written and was slated to begin production in July of the year, with Herman Yau set to return as director, and will star returning cast members Louis Koo and Sean Lau, the latter making his return since the first film, joined by new cast member Aaron Kwok. Lam stated that Andy Lau, star and producer of The White Storm 2, will not return in the sequel as he will be starring in an aerial disaster action film titled Crisis Route (formerly titled A380), another production by Universe that was in development. Production was postponed due to the COVID-19 pandemic. In November 2020, it was announced that production for The White Storm 3 will begin the following month in Hong Kong, and will move to Thailand in 2021.

Principal photography for The White Storm 3 began in June 2021. On 29 June, photos and videos from the set were released on Sina Weibo featuring Kwok, Koo and Lau on location in Xishuangbanna Dai Autonomous Prefecture, Yunnan, which was used to double as Thailand because of travel restrictions to the country due to COVID-19. The following day (30 June), Kwok posted photos showing his character's look on set on his Instagram account.

On 1 August 2021, it was reported that filming has moved to Hong Kong, where the production crew has constructed a Thai village set in the New Territories. It was also reported that the film suffered a loss of HK$10 million as a result of being unable to film in Thailand, where a set was being constructed there during pre-production stage of the film and had to change to construct a new set in Hong Kong instead as the COVID-19 pandemic was worsening in Southeast Asia.

On 13 August 2021, the film held its production commencement ceremony and press conference at Cyberport where it was attended by the cast and crew.

Production for The White Storm 3 wrapped up on 26 October 2021.

=== Accidents on set ===
On 5 September 2021, during the filming of a car chase sequence at the Hongkong United Dockyards involving four prop cars, stunt coordinator Peter Chan was crushed by one of the prop cars which suddenly flipped sideways and was sent to the Princess Margaret Hospital where he remains in the Intensive Care Unit. On 25 September 2021, it was reported that nine days later, another accident occurred during the filming of a plane crash scene involving a blown up scaffolding where three stuntmen were injured when the entire scaffolding collapsed instead of half of it collapsing like it was planned. Universe Entertainment released a statement that the injuries suffered by the crew members were not serious and they were recovering well.

== Release ==
The White Storm 3: Heaven or Hell had its North American premiere at the 22nd New York Asian Film Festival in Hong Kong panorama on 20 July 2023, consequently its China release has been advanced to 6 July.

It was theatrically released in Hong Kong on 27 July 2023.

== Reception ==
=== Box office ===
The White Storm 3: Heaven or Hell debuted at No. 4 during its opening weekend in Hong Kong, grossing HK$5,496,830 (US$705,011) after its first four days of release and bringing in a total of HK$5,521,910 (US$708,227) including preview screenings. The film remained at No. 4 during its second weekend grossing HK$4,981,446 (US$637,714), while having grossed a total of HK$10,503,821 (US$1,344,678) so far.

=== Critical response ===
Edmund Lee of the South China Morning Post gave the film a score of 3/5 stars praising the film's action sequences and major set pieces while also noting its shortcomings in the narrative and writes, "The White Storm 3: Heaven or Hell certainly doesn’t have the narrative deftness to make sense of these moral paradoxes. But as a mega-budget genre offering that goes to considerable lengths to transport its audience to a menacing foreign land, it does leave an impression."

== See also ==
- Aaron Kwok filmography
- The White Storm (film series)
