= 33rd Hong Kong Film Awards =

2014 Hong Kong Film Awards

- Date: 13 April 2014
- Hosted by: Teresa Mo; Gordon Lam; Ronald Cheng

Highlights
- Most awards: The Grandmaster (12)

The 33rd Hong Kong Film Awards ceremony, honored the best films of 2013 and took place on 13 April 2014 at Hong Kong Cultural Center, Kowloon, Hong Kong. The ceremony was hosted by Teresa Mo, Gordon Lam and Ronald Cheng, during the ceremony awards are presented in 19 categories and 1 Lifetime Achievement Award.

== Awards ==
Winners are listed first, highlighted in boldface, and indicated with a double dagger (‡).

**Best Film**: **Wong Kar-wai and Jacky Pang Yee-Wah — The Grandmaster** ‡; Stephen Chow and Y.Y. Kong — Journey to the West: Conquering the Demons; Saville Chan and Wong Yat — The Way We Dance; Daneil Lam, Alvin Lam, Wendy Wong, Stephen Lam and Benny Chan — The White Storm; Candy Leung — Unbeatable	**Best Director**: **Wong Kar-wai — The Grandmaster**‡; Johnnie To — Drug War; Benny Chan — The White Storm; Derek Kwok — As the Light Goes Out; Dante Lam — Unbeatable
**Best Screenplay**: **Zou Jingzhi, Xu Haofeng and Wong Kar-wai — The Grandmaster**‡; Zhou Zhiyong, Zhang Ji and Aubrey Lam — American Dreams in China; Xue Xiaolu — Finding Mr. Right; Wai Ka-fai, Yau Nai-Hoi, Ryker Chan and Yu Xi — Blind Detective; Jack Ng, Fung Chi-Fung and Dante Lam — Unbeatable	**Best Actor**: **Nick Cheung — Unbeatable**‡; Tony Leung Chiu-wai — The Grandmaster; Louis Koo — The White Storm; Sean Lau — The White Storm; Anthony Wong — Ip Man: The Final Fight
**Best Actress**: **Zhang Ziyi — The Grandmaster**‡; Tang Wei — Finding Mr. Right; Cherry Ngan — The Way We Dance; Sammi Cheng — Blind Detective; Nina Paw — Rigor Mortis	**Best Supporting Actor**: **Max Zhang — The Grandmaster**‡; Tong Dawei — American Dreams in China; Huang Bo — Journey to the West: Conquering the Demons; Eddie Peng — Unbeatable; Anthony Chan — Rigor Mortis
**Best Supporting Actress**: **Kara Wai — Rigor Mortis**‡; Du Juan — American Dreams in China; Carina Lau — Young Detective Dee: Rise of the Sea Dragon; Helena Law Lan — The White Storm; Crystal Lee — Unbeatable	**Best New Performer**: **Babyjohn Choi — The Way We Dance**‡; Du Juan — American Dreams in China; Fish Liew — Doomsday Party; Lin Gengxin — Young Detective Dee: Rise of the Sea Dragon; Angel Chiang — A Secret Between Us
**Best Cinematography**: **Philippe Le Sourd — The Grandmaster**‡; Anthony Pun — The White Storm; Jason Kwan — As the Light Goes Out; Kenny Tse — Unbeatable; Ng Kai-Ming — Rigor Mortis	**Best Film Editing**: **William Chang, Benjamin Courtines and Poon Hung Yiu** **— The Grandmaster**‡; Eric Kwong and Ron Chan — Firestorm; Yau Chi-Wai — The White Storm; Wong Hoi and Matthew Hui — As the Light Goes Out; Azrael Chung — Unbeatable
**Best Art Direction**: **William Chang and Alfred Yau Wai Ming** **— The Grandmaster**‡; Eric Lam — Journey to the West: Conquering the Demons; Ken Mak — Young Detective Dee: Rise of the Sea Dragon; Eric Lam — As the Light Goes Out; Irving Cheung — Rigor Mortis	**Best Costume Make Up Design**: **William Chang — The Grandmaster**‡; Dora Ng — American Dreams in China; Lee Pik-Kwan and Bruce Yu — Journey to the West: Conquering the Demons; Lee Pik-Kwan and Bruce Yu — Young Detective Dee: Rise of the Sea Dragon; Kittichon Kunratchol, Miggy Cheng, Phoebe Wong and Kittichon Kunratchol — Rigor Mortis
**Best Action Choreography**: **Yuen Wo-ping — The Grandmaster**‡; Yuen Bun and Lin Feng — Young Detective Dee: Rise of the Sea Dragon; Chin Ka-lok — Firestorm; Donnie Yen — Special ID; Tony Ling — Unbeatable	**Best Original Film Score**: **Shigeru Umebayashi and Nathaniel Mechaly — The Grandmaster**‡; Kenji Kawai — Young Detective Dee: Rise of the Sea Dragon; Day Tai and Afuc Chan — The Way We Dance; Teddy Robin and Tomy Wai — As the Light Goes Out; Henry Lai Wan-man — Unbeatable
**Best Original Film Song**: **"Let's Dance" (狂舞吧) — The Way We Dance**‡; Composer: Day Tai; Lyricist: Saville Chan; Singer: Dough-Boy feat. Shimica Wong; 新秩序 — Young And Dangerous: Reloaded; Composer/Singer: Paul Wong; Lyricist: Paul Wong; Love is Blind — Blind Detective; Composer: Hal Foxton Beckett and Marc Baril; Lyricist: Lam Jik; Singer: Andy Lau and Sammi Cheng; 心照一生 — The White Storm; Composer/Singer: RubberBand; Lyricist: RubberBand and Tim Lui; 愛最大 — As the Light Goes Out; Composer: Nicholas Tse; Lyricist: Nicholas Tse, Qiao Xing, Kit and Phat; Singer: Nicholas Tse and 24Herbs	**Best Sound Design**: **Robert Mackenzie and Traithep Wongpaiboon** **— The Grandmaster**‡; Kinson Tsang — Young Detective Dee: Rise of the Sea Dragon; Phyllis Cheng — As the Light Goes Out; Phyllis Cheng — Unbeatable; Benny Chu and Steve Miller — Rigor Mortis
**Best Visual Effects**: **Enoch Chan — Rigor Mortis**‡; Pierre Buffin — The Grandmaster; Wook Kim — Young Detective Dee: Rise of the Sea Dragon; Yee Kwok-Leung, Lai Man-Chun, Ho Kwan-Yeung and Garrett K Lam — Firestorm; Henri Wong, Hugo Kwan and Walter Wong — As the Light Goes Out	**Best New Director**: **Adam Wong — The Way We Dance**‡; Alan Yuen — Firestorm; Juno Mak — Rigor Mortis
**Best Film from Mainland and Taiwan**: **So Young (mainland China)** ‡; Rock Me to the Moon (Taiwan); Lost In Thailand (mainland China); The Last Supper (mainland China); Touch of the Light (Taiwan)	**Lifetime Achievement**: **Cheung Sing-Yim**‡
