= Day Tai =

Hong Kong film score composer (born 1973/1974)

- 戴偉
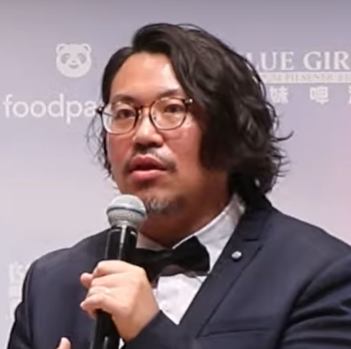
- Tai in April 2024
- Born: Tai Wai; 1973 or 1974 (age 52–53); Hong Kong
- Occupations: Musician; Composer
- Years active: 2007–present

Day Tai Wai (Chinese: 戴偉; born 1973/1974) is a Hong Kong film score composer. He debuted in the showbiz as a member of the band A-dAY in 2007 before transitioning to film scoring with The Way We Dance (2013). A 17-time nominee at the Hong Kong Film Awards, Tai won Best Original Film Song thrice for The Way We Dance, She Remembers, He Forgets (2015), and Weeds on Fire (2016), as well as Best Original Film Score for Band Four (2023). He is also the composer of Broadway Circuit's "Song of Cinema Etiquette", which was played before films began screening.

== Early life and education ==
Tai was born into a middle-class family in 1973 or 1974. He began learning piano at a young age but did not initially plan to pursue a career in music. His interest in music developed during secondary school, where he cited Taiwanese musician Jonathan Lee as his inspiration to write songs. A devout Christian, Tai initially intended to use music to preach Christianity. In 1993, he attended university in Canada, majoring in computer science. During his university years, he started writing music and took elective courses to use the school's recording studio, experimenting with producing his songs. He graduated in 1996 at the age of 22 and returned to Hong Kong, initially planning to enter the music industry. He briefly worked at a record shop in Kowloon City and in promotions at Metro Broadcast, hoping to build connections for a music career, but faced rejections from multiple record studios. To make a living, he took a job in IT but remained passionate about music, often playing after work.

== Career ==
In 2007, Tai formed the band A-dAY with his friend Angus Ting, and they won the championship in the CASH Pop Music Composition Contest. After their win, they signed a one-year contract with a record label. Tai initially quit his job to pursue music full-time, but they received limited opportunities, leading him to return to IT. Two years later, he resumed sending demos to record labels while holding full-time jobs, eventually receiving several offers for advertising music. After scoring for Fortune Pharmacal, he was recommended to compose the film score for Wong Jing's film Men Suddenly in Love. Although the film was critically panned, it exposed him to film scoring and opened doors in the industry.

In 2012, Tai wrote the score and theme song for Adam Wong's drama film The Way We Dance, with James Marsh of Screen Anarchy praising his "attention-grabbing tunes". The film grossed over HKD$13 million and earned Tai Best Original Film Song in the 33rd Hong Kong Film Awards. Following the success of The Way We Dance, he began receiving invitations for film scoring, including collaborations with Adam Wong on She Remembers, He Forgets and Weeds on Fire, for which he won Best Original Film Song in the 35th and 36th Hong Kong Film Awards. Elizabeth Kerr of The Hollywood Reporter particularly commended Tai's "suitably mid-'80s synth-pop score" in Weeds On Fire; while the band Supper Moment joined the production as the main vocalist Sunny Chan was a fan of A-dAY. In 2017, Tai composed the "Song of Cinema Etiquette", performed by Eman Lam with animation by visual artist b.wing, which was shown before film screenings at Broadway Circuit theaters. The song went viral in Hong Kong, with HK01 describing it as "widely known" and "one of the most prominent songs in recent years". In 2018, he also wrote music for the crime film Project Gutenberg, which earned him another nomination for Best Original Film Score, and the action film Master Z: Ip Man Legacy, although The Hollywood Reporter's Kerr noted that Tai's score for Master Z was "occasionally off the mark". In 2019, he served as the founding treasurer of the Hong Kong Film Composers Association.

In 2020, Tai began working as a lecturer in film music composition at Hong Kong Baptist University. He reunited with Adam Wong for The Way We Keep Dancing, the sequel to The Way We Dance, earning nominations for Best Original Film Song in the 57th Golden Horse Awards and Best Original Film Song in the 40th Hong Kong Film Awards, as well as winning Best Music in the 15th Asian Film Awards. Tai also composed music for the ViuTV fantasy series Leap Day, and received nominations for Best Original Film Song and Best Original Film Score for the 2021 drama film Zero to Hero in the 40th Hong Kong Film Awards. Allan Hunter of Screen International praised Tai's score for Zero to Hero as favoring "soaring strings and heavenly choruses" courtesy of the Hong Kong Children's Choir. In 2023, Tai scored the musical film Band Four and the crime film The Goldfinger, earning three nominations and a win for Best Original Film Score in the 42nd Hong Kong Film Awards. In 2024, he participated in the romance film Love Lies and another Adam Wong film The Way We Talk. He was nominated for Best Original Film Score with the former and Best Original Film Song with both films in the 43rd Hong Kong Film Awards.

== Filmography ==
=== Film ===
Year	Title	Notes
2011	Men Suddenly in Love	
2013	The Way We Dance	
2015	She Remembers, He Forgets	
2016	Weeds on Fire	
2017	Tomorrow Is Another Day	
2018	Project Gutenberg	
2018	Master Z: Ip Man Legacy	
2019	Chasing the Dragon II: Wild Wild Bunch	
2019	The Invincible Dragon	
2020	The Way We Keep Dancing	
2021	Zero to Hero	
2021	The First Girl I Loved	
2023	Band Four	
2023	The Goldfinger	
2024	Love Lies	
2024	The Way We Talk	

=== Television ===
Year	Title	Notes
2020	Leap Day	
2022	940920	

== Awards and nominations ==
Year	Award	Category	Work	Result	Ref.
2014	33rd Hong Kong Film Awards	Best Original Film Song	The Way We Dance	Won	
2014	33rd Hong Kong Film Awards	Best Original Film Score	The Way We Dance	Nominated	
2016	35th Hong Kong Film Awards	Best Original Film Song	She Remembers, He Forgets	Won	
2016	35th Hong Kong Film Awards	Best Original Film Score	She Remembers, He Forgets	Nominated	
2017	36th Hong Kong Film Awards	Best Original Film Song	Weeds on Fire	Won	
2017	36th Hong Kong Film Awards	Best Original Film Score	Weeds on Fire	Nominated	
2019	38th Hong Kong Film Awards	Best Original Film Score	Project Gutenberg	Nominated	
2020	57th Golden Horse Awards	Best Original Film Song	The Way We Keep Dancing	Nominated	
2021	15th Asian Film Awards	Best Music	The Way We Keep Dancing	Won	
2022	40th Hong Kong Film Awards	Best Original Film Song	The Way We Keep Dancing	Nominated	
2022	40th Hong Kong Film Awards	Best Original Film Song	Zero to Hero	Nominated	
2022	40th Hong Kong Film Awards	Best Original Film Score	Zero to Hero	Nominated	
2024	42nd Hong Kong Film Awards	Best Original Film Song	The Goldfinger	Nominated	
2024	42nd Hong Kong Film Awards	Best Original Film Song	Band Four	Nominated	
2024	42nd Hong Kong Film Awards	Best Original Film Score	The Goldfinger	Nominated	
2024	42nd Hong Kong Film Awards	Best Original Film Score	Band Four	Won	
2025	43rd Hong Kong Film Awards	Best Original Film Song	The Way We Talk	Nominated	
2025	43rd Hong Kong Film Awards	Best Original Film Song	Love Lies	Nominated	
2025	43rd Hong Kong Film Awards	Best Original Film Score	Love Lies	Nominated	
