= Cherry Ngan =

Hong Kong singer, actress and model

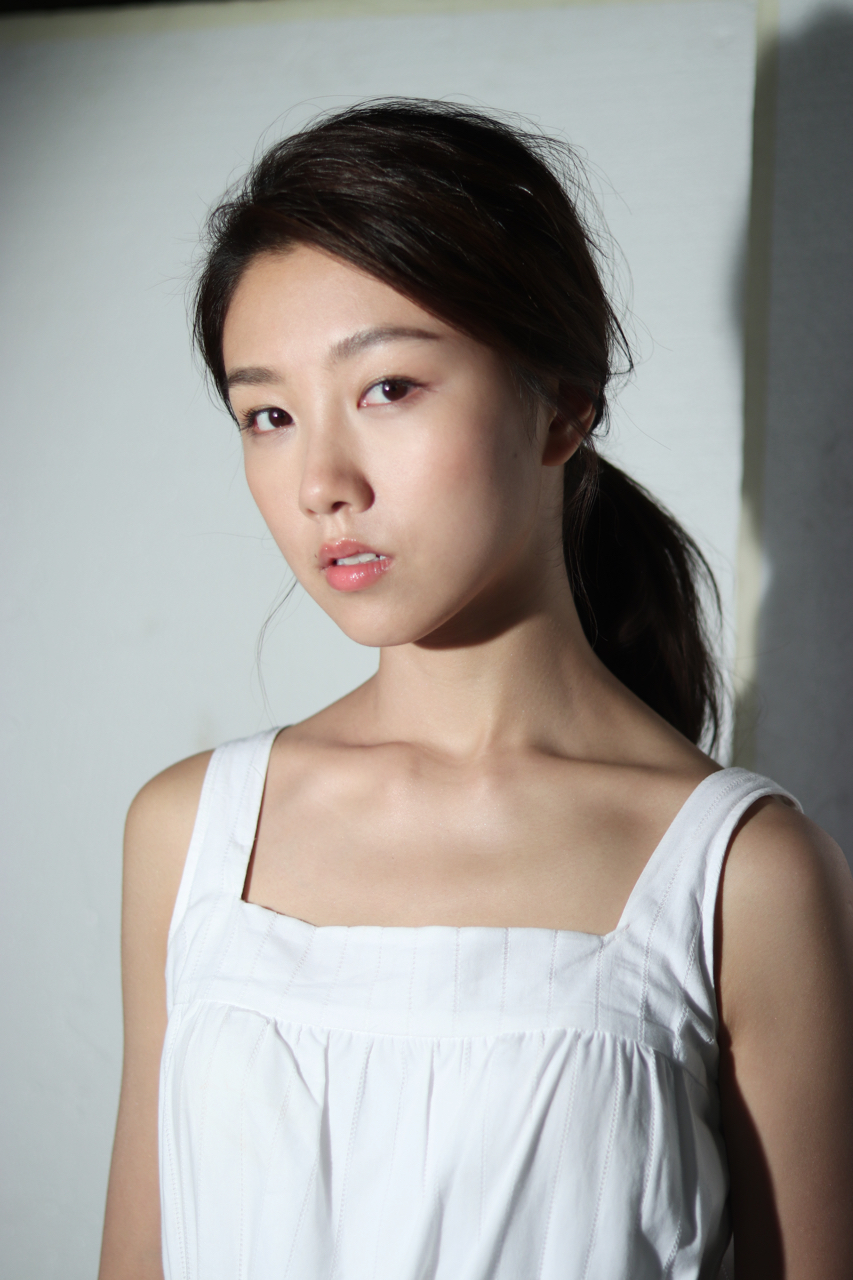
- Ngan in 2018
- Born: December 27, 1993 (age 32); Hong Kong
- Education: Degree (English Language and Literature)
- Alma mater: Hong Kong Baptist University
- Occupations: Actress; singer; model

Chinese name
- Traditional Chinese: 顏卓靈
- Simplified Chinese: 颜卓灵
Transcriptions
Standard Mandarin
- Hanyu Pinyin: yán zhuó líng
Yue: Cantonese
- Jyutping: ngaan4 coek3 ling4

Cherry Ngan (Chinese: 顏卓靈; Jyutping: ngaan4 coek3 ling4) is a Hong Kong singer, actress and model. She is best known for her role in the 2013 Chinese film The Way We Dance for which she nominated as best actress at both the Hong Kong Film Award and the Golden Horse Awards. As well as acting Ngan has appeared in a number of advertising campaigns including those for McDonald's, Olympus, and K-Swiss. In 2017, she released her debut single Flash (閃光).

== Biography ==
Ngan grew up in Hong Kong and attended Sha Tin Government Secondary School where she appeared in a number of school plays and took part in after school theater groups studying acting and different styles of dance. At the age of 15, while still in school she discovered a casting call via Facebook for The Way We Dance and subsequently won the role of Fleur. In 2012 Ngan studied English Language and Literature at Hong Kong Baptist University working alongside her film career and attending award ceremonies. In 2017 Ngan announced she was dating film director Michael Ning.

== Discography ==
=== Album ===
- Primary (2018)

Track Listing:
1. "Flash"
2. "Baby Stop"
3. "The Villainess Debunks"
4. "No Man Is An Island"
5. "Reverse Growth"
6. "Flash (Remix)"

== Filmography ==
Year	Film	Role	Ref.
2010	Fire of Conscience	Kerosene's crook	
2012	Nightfall	George's daughter	
2012	Floating City		
2013	The Way We Dance	Lam Fa	
2013	Tales from the Dark 1		
2014	The Midnight After	Yi	
2015	Mojin - The Lost Legend	Yoko	
2016	Finding Mr Right 2	Young Jiao	
2016	At Cafe 6	Li Xin-Rui	
2016	My Love Sinema		
2016	Cherry Returns	Ah Ying	
2017	Zombiology: Enjoy Yourself Tonight		
2018	Concerto of the Bully		
2018	Transcendent		
2019	The Shadow Play		
2021	The Way We Keep Dancing		
2021	New Turn		
2022	Tales from the Occult		
2024	Crisis Negotiators	Maggie	

=== Music video appearances ===
Year	Title	Notes
2013	Shimica Wong - "The Way We Dance"	The Way We Dance OST
2013	DoughBoy feat. Shimica Wong - "Let's Dance"	The Way We Dance OST
2023	Ian Chan - "Farewell, Sea of Tranquility"	
