= Shimica Wong =

- Born: 9 November 1993 (age 32); Hong kong
- Occupations: Singer-songwriter, music producer
- Years active: 2007–present
- Awards: Best Original Film Song – 33rd Hong Kong Film Awards
- Musical career
- Instruments: Vocals, guitar, piano, keyboards
- Labels: Dynesty Empire 藝皇 (2017–present); B2 Talent Asia (Billboard); Modest Music

Shimica Wong (born 9 November 1993) is a music producer and singer. She won Best Original Film Song at the 33rd Hong Kong Film Awards with her single "Let's Dance" from the 2013 film The Way We Dance.

== Biography ==
Wong was born in Spain then moved to Hong Kong at the age of three. She won Best Original Film Song with her single "Let's Dance" from the 2013 film The Way We Dance at the 33rd Hong Kong Film Awards. She is in charge of her own label Hybrid Music production and Dynesty Empire.

Among her collaborations, she has worked with Joseph Anthony Somers-Morales, known as SoMo, on the remix of "50 Feet" and "Tonight", and with Chinese DJ and producer Lizzy Wang. As of 11 July 2020 Shimica is the producer of the song "Casada" by Hong Kong actress, singer and dancer Grace Wong.

== Filmography ==
Year	Title	Role	Notes	Refs
2017	Lucky Fat Man zh:我要發達	Mama	As Shimica Wong Yu-Hei	
2017	Letting Down 負女	Shimica	Short film, directed by Colleen Lau	

== Discography ==
=== Singles as lead artist ===
List of singles, with selected chart positions
Title	Album details	Peak positions (Hong Kong)				Album
Title	Album details	CRHK (903)	RTHK	Metro Radio Hong Kong (997)	Other	Album
"make me feel good"	Released: 5 September 2007; Language: English	–	–	–	(Note: "make me feel good" placed number 44 on Soundclick)	–
"The Way We Dance"; Theme song for The Way We Dance	Released: 2 August 2013; Language: English; Formats: Digital download	–	–	–	–	The Way We Dance soundtrack
"Soporific Drugs" (失眠藥)	Released: 2013; Language: Cantonese	–	–	–	–	–
"Wilderness for Freedom" (zh:自由野)	Released: 24 May 2014; Label: Honger; Languages: English and Cantonese; Formats: Promotional CD single	–	7	17	(Note: "Wilderness for Freedom" charted at number 7 on TVB)	–
"Heartless X Mark" (zh:狠心的交叉)	Released: 10 December 2014; Label: Honger; Language: Cantonese; Formats: Promotional CD single, digital download	–	–	–	(Note: "Heartless X Mark" charted at number 7 on TVB)	–
"Losing Myself Over You" (愛你愛到沒自己)	Released: 17 April 2015; Label: Honger; Languages: Mandarin; Formats: Promotional CD single, digital download	–	–	–	(Note: "Losing Myself Over You" charted at number 6 on TVB8)	–
"Do you really wanna be with me" Shimica Wong x Sheldon Lo	Released: 24 February 2016; Label: Honger; Languages: Mandarin; Formats: Promotional CD single, digital download	–	–	–	(Note: "Do you really wanna be with me" charted at number 1 on TVB8)	–
"Drop me in the air" Shimica ft. Silverstrike	Released: 2017; Languages: English	–	–	–	–	–
"Always On The Road"	Released: 2017; Languages: English, Mandarin	–	–	–	–	Always On The Road soundtrack
"Another Side"	Released: 2017; Languages: English, Mandarin	–	–	–	–	–

=== Singles as featured artist ===
List of singles, with selected chart positions
Title	Album details	Peak positions (Hong Kong)				Album
Title	Album details	CRHK (903)	RTHK	Metro Radio Hong Kong (997)	Other	Album
"Let's Dance" (狂舞吧); Dough-Boy feat. Shimica Wong	Released: 2 August 2013; Language: English and Cantonese; Formats: Digital download	2	2	3	–	The Way We Dance soundtrack
"Wine glass hit the piano again" (酒杯再敲琴); Joe Cheng Feat. Shimica Wong & Yu Chun Tung 余震東	Released: 2014; Label: Honger Music; Language: Cantonese	–	–	–	(Note: "Wine glass hit the piano again" charted at number 8 on TVB)	–

== Awards and nominations ==
Organization	Award category	Recipients and nominees	Result
33rd Hong Kong Film Awards	Best Original Film Song	"Let's Dance" (狂舞吧) — The Way We Dance: Composer: Day Tai; Lyricist: Saville Chan; Singer: Dough-Boy feat. Shimica Wong	Won
Metro Radio Hits Music Awards Presentation	New Media Song (Note: "Let's Dance" was one of four songs given the New Media Song Award at the Metro Radio Hits Music Awards Presentation. It did not get the Gold Award.)	"Let's Dance" (狂舞吧) — The Way We Dance: Composer: Day Tai; Lyricist: Saville Chan; Singer: Dough-Boy feat. Shimica Wong	Won
The 25th Song Writers Quest (Note: The 25th Song Writers Quest recognizes three songs by members of Composers and Authors Society of Hong Kong (CASH). Only three awards are given: Winner, 1st Runner-up and 2nd Runner-up)		"Soporific Drugs" (失眠藥): Composer: Alex Kwong; Lyricist: Alex Kwong; Singer: Shimica Wong	1st runner-up
