= The White Storm 2: Drug Lords =

2019 Hong Kong film by Herman Yau

- Official film poster

Chinese name
- Traditional Chinese: 掃毒2天地對決
- Simplified Chinese: 扫毒2天地对决
- Literal meaning: Sweep Away the Poison 2: Final Contest for Heaven and Earth
Transcriptions
Standard Mandarin
- Hanyu Pinyin: Sǎo Dú Èr: Tiāndì Duìjué
Yue: Cantonese
- Jyutping: Sou3 Deok6 Ji6 Tin1 Dei6 Deoi3 Kyut3
- Directed by: Herman Yau
- Written by: Herman Yau; Erica Li; Eric Lee
- Produced by: Andy Lau; Alvin Lam; Esther Koo; Wong Chun-kei; Shirley Yeung; Chan Wai-keung
- Starring: Andy Lau; Louis Koo; Michael Miu; Karena Lam
- Cinematography: Joe Chan
- Edited by: Azrael Chung
- Music by: Mak Chun Hung
- Production companies: Universe Entertainment; Sil-Metropole Organisation; Guangdong Sublime Media; Focus Films; Sun Entertainment Culture; Yinming Culture Communication; Hero Films
- Distributed by: Universe Films Distribution (Hong Kong, Worldwide); Gala Film Distribution (Hong Kong)
- Release dates: 5 July 2019 (China); 16 July 2019 (Hong Kong)
- Running time: 100 minutes
- Country: Hong Kong
- Language: Cantonese
- Budget: US$25 million
- Box office: US$200 million

The White Storm 2: Drug Lords is a 2019 Hong Kong action film directed by Herman Yau, produced by and starring Andy Lau. The film is a thematic sequel in-title-only to the 2013 film The White Storm with a new storyline and stars returning cast member Louis Koo in a different role.

The film was first announced on 15 March 2018. Production for The White Storm 2: Drug Lords began on 23 June 2018, and wrapped up on 12 September 2018. The film was theatrically released on 5 July 2019, in China, on 12 July 2019, in Taiwan, and on 16 July 2019, in Hong Kong. The film was also selected to be the closing film for 18th New York Asian Film Festival on 14 July 2019. It was selected as the Hong Kong entry for the Best International Feature Film at the 92nd Academy Awards, but it was not nominated.

The White Storm 2: Drug Lords was a major commercial success, grossing a total of US$200 million worldwide against a budget of US$25 million. The film received mixed reviews from critics, who generally praised the performances of Lau and Koo and the film's action choreography but noted shortcomings in its script and character development.

A thematic sequel to the film, The White Storm 3: Heaven or Hell began production in June 2021, with Yau returning to direct, Koo returning to star alongside Sean Lau, who makes a return from the first film, and new cast member Aaron Kwok. The sequel was released on 28 July 2023.

== Plot ==
In 2004, triad member Jizo was caught dealing drugs in his night club. His boss, Yu Nam, punishes Jizo by ordering his compatriot Yu Shun-tin to cut off his fingers and expel him from the organisation. Yu, who witnessed his father being consumed by drug addiction during childhood and abhors drugs as deadly foes, eventually decides to resign from the Triad and live a straight life.

It is now 2019 and Yu has become a billionaire tycoon and philanthropist known as the "Finance Whiz", after meeting lawyer Michelle, who becomes Yu's wife and business partner. Meanwhile, Jizo is now one of the biggest drug lords in the Hong Kong underworld. Yu discovers that he actually has a long-lost son with his recently deceased ex-girlfriend, May. He travels to the Philippines to find his son, only to witness him commit suicide due to the effects from a drug overdose. After returning, Yu vows to destroy the drug trade in Hong Kong. Using his wealth and former triad connections, he orders several hits and coordinates a chain of dog-eat-dog events which shocks the whole drug trade, putting the players on high alert. Police chief inspector Lam Ching-fung and his team conduct drug raids involving Yu's men, and Afghani gangs. Lam discovers Yu is extracting revenge on the whole drug trade over the death of his son. Jizo, discovering that this act is being orchestrated by Yu, confronts his former brother, and publicly reveals to Inspector Lam that Yu has a history with the Triad.

Yu then offers a bounty of HK$100 million to kill the number one drug dealer in Hong Kong, which causes a stir in the criminal underworld and society at large. Because his bounty was not directed at a specific person, the police are unable to prosecute Yu. Fearing reprisal, Jizo voluntarily turns himself in to the police, and Inspector Lam is now responsible for protecting Jizo from the bounty instead of arresting him. Jizo also orders a hit on Yu, but the killer accidentally kills Michelle instead.

Enraged by the death of his wife, Yu launches an all-out attack on Jizo, eventually cornering him in a subway tunnel. Inspector Lam then arrives and they have a three-way shootout. Both Yu and Jizo are killed while Inspector Lam survives. Lam honours Yu's legacy by using the bounty to open a centre for children whose parents were drug addicts.

== Cast ==
- Andy Lau as Yu Shun-tin (余順天), a financial tycoon and philanthropist whose father and grandfather were both victims of drug abuse and offers a HK$100 million bounty to eliminate Hong Kong's top drug dealer. Yu is a former member of the Ching Hing (正興) triad and was brothers with Jizo in the past.
- Louis Koo as Fung Chun-kwok (馮振國), known as Jizo (地藏), Hong Kong's number one drug dealer, who is targeted by Yu Shun-tin, who was his sworn brother when they belonged to the Ching Hing triad gang. Their enmity began when Yu chopped off Jizo's fingers as punishment for his drug trafficking.
- Michael Miu as Lam Ching-fung (林正風), chief inspector of the Narcotics Bureau.
- Karena Lam as Michelle Chow (鄒文鳳), Yu Shun-tin's wife, who is a lawyer.
- Kent Cheng as Yu Nam (余南), leader of the Ching Hing triad and Yu Shun-tin's uncle who forbids drug business in the gang and ordered his nephew to chop off Jizo's fingers. (special appearance)
- Gordon Lam as the Secretary for Justice of Hong Kong. (special appearance)
- Chrissie Chau as May Chan (陳靜美), Yu Shun-tin's ex-girlfriend who left him due to his alcoholism. (special appearance)
- Cherrie Ying as Fong Yau-ka (方悠嘉), known as Sister Ca (Ca姐), one of the four major drug dealers in Hong Kong. (special appearance)
- Cheung Kwok-keung as Ming (阿明), Yu Shun-tin's right hand man.
- Carlos Chan as Jack Yau (丘世鴻), Lam Ching-fung's subordinate and Apple's fiance.
- Michelle Wai as Apple Tse (謝家欣), Lam Ching-fung's subordinate and Jack's fiance.
- Jun Kung as Cho Tai (曹泰), one of the four major drug dealers in Hong Kong.
- MC Jin as Cho Ping (曹平), Cho Tai's younger brother.
- Jimmy Au as Chiu Wing-cheung (趙永昌), Yu Shun-tin's right hand man.
- Jerome Cheung as Dicky (迪奇), Jizo's underling.
- Elena Kong as Cheung Ching (張清), Lam Ching-fung's wife, who is an officer of the Emergency Unit (EU) and was killed by a junkie during a drug raid operation at Jizo's nightclub in 2004.
- Lau Kong as Cheung Chi-ming (張子明), chief superintendent of the Narcotics Bureau.
- Ben Yuen as the Deputy Commissioner of Police Operations.
- Halina Tam as Doctor Siu Ka-man (蕭家文), a gynecologist and Michelle's doctor.
- Gill Mohindepaul Singh as Abbas Abraham (阿巴斯) a South Asian drug dealer who was executed by Yu Shun-tin.
- Sam Lee as a neighbourhood small-time drug dealer.
- Philippe Joly as Josef, a European drug dealer.
- Faith Lee as Florence Lam (林海嵐), Lam Ching-fung and Cheung Ching's daughter.

== Theme song ==
- Brotherhood (兄弟不懷疑)
  - Singer: Andy Lau, Louis Koo
  - Composer/Arranger: Jacky Cai
  - Lyricist: Andy Lau
  - Producer: Jacky Chan

== Production ==
=== Development ===
On 15 March 2018, Universe Entertainment announced a sequel to The White Storm, will start shooting during the summer and unveiled its teaser film poster, as well as announcing and unveiling the teaser poster of the sequel to the 2017 film, Shock Wave, on the same day. The sequel to the former, titled The White Storm 2: Drug Lords, was a thematic sequel to the first film with a new storyline and featured Louis Koo returning in a different role as well as being the only returning cast member from the first film. Andy Lau, who produced and starred in Shock Wave, joined the cast as well as served as the film's producer, receiving a reported salary of HK$40 million, while Herman Yau, who directed Shock Wave, replaced Benny Chan as the director for the sequel. According to Universe Entertainment, filming for The White Storm 2: Drug Lords was to take place in Hong Kong and the Philippines, while the budget for the sequel was increased from the first film's budget of US$16 million to US$25 million to intensify the action sequences. A week later, the film was promoted at the 2018 Hong Kong International Film & TV Market (Filmart), which ran from 19 to 22 March 2018.

=== Filming ===
Principal photography for The White Storm 2: Drug Lords began on 23 June 2018, in Hong Kong. Photos from the production set featuring stars Lau and Koo, along with various crew members were released.

On 17 July 2018, at around 8:00 PM, filming of an action scene involving a gun fight and auto chase took place in Fenwick Pier, where cast members Lau and Carlos Chan were present. Filming for that scene lasted until early morning of the next day.

On 22 July 2018, the film held its first press conference in the form of a drug sweep ceremony at a 1:1 replica set of the Central MTR Station at the Kai Tak Cruise Terminal which took over five months to construct with a cost of over HK$10 million. The promotion event was attended by director Yau along with cast members Lau, Koo, Michael Miu, Cherrie Ying, Chrissie Chau, Michelle Wai, and Cheung Kwok-keung. During the event, Lau and Koo were driven to the MTR station in a police cruiser, while Miu, who portrays a chief superintendent officer, leads a drug raid operation in the set where director Yau and the cast swept away prop cocaine on the ground with brooms.

As filming was coming to an end, a production wrap up ceremony for the film was held on 31 August 2018, at the Marco Polo Hongkong Hotel in Tsim Sha Tsui, attended by director Yau and cast members Lau, Koo, Miu, Lam, Cheung, Kent Cheng, and Jimmy Au.

Filming for The White Storm 2: Drug Lords officially concluded on 12 September 2018, after shooting its final scene on location at the actual Central MTR Station with Lau, Miu, and director Yau present.

== Release ==
The White Storm 2: Drug Lords was theatrically released in China on 5 July 2019, on 12 July 2019, in Taiwan and western countries such as United Kingdom, Australia, and North America, and on 16 July 2019, in Hong Kong.

The White Storm 2: Drug Lords was shown at the closing of the 18th New York Asian Film Festival on 14 July 2019, as well as competing for the Audience Award.

=== Promotion ===
On 18 March 2019, a press conference for the film attended by the cast and crew was held at the 2019 Hong Kong International Film & TV Market (FILMART).

== Reception ==
=== Critical reception ===
On Rotten Tomatoes, The White Storm 2: Drug Lords has an approval rating of 57% based on seven reviews, with an average rating of 5.3/10.

Elizabeth Kerr of The Hollywood Reporter praises the film's finale action sequence and Louis Koo's performance for making up the shortcomings in narrative logic and editorial and describes the film as "a leaner entertainment-for-entertainment’s-sake exercise that's ideal for the summer season" compared to its predecessor. Richard Kuipers of Variety praised the film's shootout and car stunt sequences staged by Gobi Ng with minimal special effects and other technical aspects such as Joe Chan's cinematography and Renee Wong's production design as well as performances by Andy Lau and Koo, referring to the former's as "charismatic" and the latter's as "enjoyable." Derek Winnert of the London Film Critics' Circle gave the film a score of 3/4 stars and praises the stunt work and action choreography as "the real star of the movie" and the film's execution as "more original and impressive than the story, plotting, and characters." Andrew Chan of Film Critics Circle of Australia gave the film a score of 7.5/10 on his blog, praising Lau's understated performance of displaying internal turmoil and Koo's impactful performance as the villain and concludes it as "an enjoyable ride with all that is happening in the reality of Hong Kong today."

Edmund Lee of the South China Morning Post gave the film a score of 3/5 stars and praises the film's exhilarating action, particularly its finale, and describes the film as "thoroughly thrilling." Gabriel Chong of Movie Xclusive gave the film a similar score of 3/5 and complements director Herman Yau for keeping the film's fast and frantic pace while keeping coherence was a "100-minute continuous action-packed sequence" but notes its flaws in character depth. Simon Abrams of RogerEbert.com gave the film a score of 2.5/4 stars and calls it "a satisfying dramatization of reluctant maneuvering" while also praising Lau and Koo's performances and their characters' clashing personalities as compelling forces that keep the film interesting.

Leslie Felperin of The Guardian gave the film a score of 2/5 stars and praises the film's inventively staged action but notes the film's lack of subtlety in preaching the negativity of crime. John Tan of The New Paper gave the film a score of 2/5 and praises Koo's entertaining performance but describes the action scenes as over the top and criticizes the film's editing. Jamie Healy of Radio Times gave the film a similar score of 2/5 stars and notes director Yau's favouring of overemotion, which undermines the suspense and tension, but credits the stunt team for the film's impressive action. David Aril of The Star notes the lack of consistent and compelling antagonism between the two main characters, but credits the action unit and stunt team who "outperform those on scripting duties."

=== Box office ===
The White Storm 2: Drug Lords has grossed a total of US$200 million worldwide, combining its box office gross from Hong Kong, China, Taiwan, United States, United Kingdom, Australia, New Zealand, and Vietnam.

==== China ====
Opening on 5 July 2019, in China, The White Storm 2: Drug Lords grossed a total of ¥135.67 million (US$19.7 million) on its opening day, ranking No. 1, accounting for over 52 percent of the daily total box office in the country. It also set the record as the biggest opening day for a Hong Kong film in China. During its opening weekend, the film has grossed a total of US$62.4 million (¥432.28 million), ranking No. 1 at the Chinese box office and No. 3 at the international box office.

The film remained at No. 1 during its second weekend, where it grossed US$76 million and accumulating a total gross of US$135.8 million by then.

After 12 days of release on 16 July 2019, the film has passed the ¥1 billion mark in China, grossing a total of ¥1.013 billion (US$149.85 million) by then.

On its third weekend, the film grossed US$33.4 million, placing at No. 3, while accumulating a total gross of US$169.3 million by then.

During its fourth weekend, the film grossed US$12.3 million and was placed at No. 4, accumulating a total gross of US$181.7 million by then.

On its fifth week, the film grossed US$3.1 million and ranked at No. 6, accumulating a total gross of US$184.8 million by the end of the weekend.

The White Storm 2: Drug Lords grossed a total of ¥1,312,886,000 at the Chinese box office after ending its theatrical run on 13 September 2019, making it the highest-grossing Hong Kong film in China until it was overtaken by Lau and Yau's next collaboration, Shock Wave 2, in 2021.

==== Taiwan ====
Released on 12 July 2019, in Taiwan, the film grossed NT$1.72 million in its capital, Taipei, setting the record for the biggest opening for a Hong Kong film in the city. By the end of its opening weekend, the film had grossed NT$4.98 million in the city, making it the biggest opening week for a Chinese-language film in 2019. On the other hand, the film grossed NT$10 million throughout Taiwan in its first two days of release and grossed a total of NT$17 million by the end of its opening weekend in the country, also making it the biggest opening week for a Chinese-language film of 2019 in the entire Taiwan.

By 22 July 2019, the film has reached a gross of NT$30 million in Taiwan so far.

==== Hong Kong ====
Opening on 16 July 2019, The White Storm 2: Drug Lords debuted No. 1 with a gross of HK$2.2 million on its opening day, despite strong competition from Hollywood blockbusters. By the end of its opening weekend, the film grossed HK$13,797,840, ranking at second place.

During its second week, the film grossed HK$6,792,460 and was ranked No. 2 at the weekly box office, accumulating a total gross of HK$20,590,300 by the end of the weekend.

On its third week, the film grossed HK$3,103,331 at the weekly box office and was placed at No. 5, accumulating a total gross of HK$23,693,631 by the end of the weekend.

During its fourth week, the film grossed HK$871,632 at the weekly box office and was placed at No. 9, accumulating a total gross of HK$24,568,576 by the end of the weekend.

The White Storm 2: Drug Lords grossed a total of HK$24,813,706 at the Hong Kong box office after ending its theatrical run on 4 September 2019, making it the second-highest domestic film of 2019 in the territory.

== Awards and nominations ==
| Ceremony | Category | Recipient | Results |
|---|---|---|---|
| 39th Hong Kong Film Awards | Best Action Choreography | Hon Ping, Gobi Ng | Nominated |
| 39th Hong Kong Film Awards | Best Original Film Song | Song: Brotherhood (兄弟不懷疑) Composer: Jacky Cai; Lyricist: Andy Lau; Singer: Andy Lau, Louis Koo | Nominated |
| 39th Hong Kong Film Awards | Best Sound Design | Nip Kei-wing, Yip Siu-kei | Nominated |
| 39th Hong Kong Film Awards | Best Visual Effects | Yee Kwok-leung, Ma Siu-fu, Leung Wai-man, Ho Man-lok | Won |
| 3rd Kongest Film Awards | Best Actor | Louis Koo | Nominated |
| 3rd Kongest Film Awards | My Favorite Hong Kong Film | The White Storm 2: Drug Lords | Nominated |

== Sequel ==
In March 2020, Universe Entertainment chairman Daneil Lam announced to the Hong Kong press that a sequel to the film, titled The White Storm 3: Heaven or Hell, was being written and was slated to begin production in July of the year, with Herman Yau set to return as director, and will star returning cast members Louis Koo and Sean Lau, the latter making his return since the first film, joined by new cast member Aaron Kwok, while Andy Lau is unable to return as he will be starring in another Universe production, the aerial disaster-themed action film, Crisis Route (formerly titled A380). However, due to the COVID-19 pandemic, production was postponed to December 2020, and was postponed once again before officially commencing in June 2021. The White Storm 3: Heaven or Hell was theatrically released on 28 July 2023.

== See also ==
- The White Storm (film series)
- List of submissions to the 92nd Academy Awards for Best International Feature Film
- List of Hong Kong submissions for the Academy Award for Best International Feature Film
