= Hong Kong Film Award for Lifetime Achievement =

Award for Hong Kong filmmakers

Hong Kong Film Awards Lifetime Achievement Award
- Awarded for: Contributions to Hong Kong cinema
- Country: Hong Kong
- Presented by: Hong Kong Film Awards
- First award: 1983

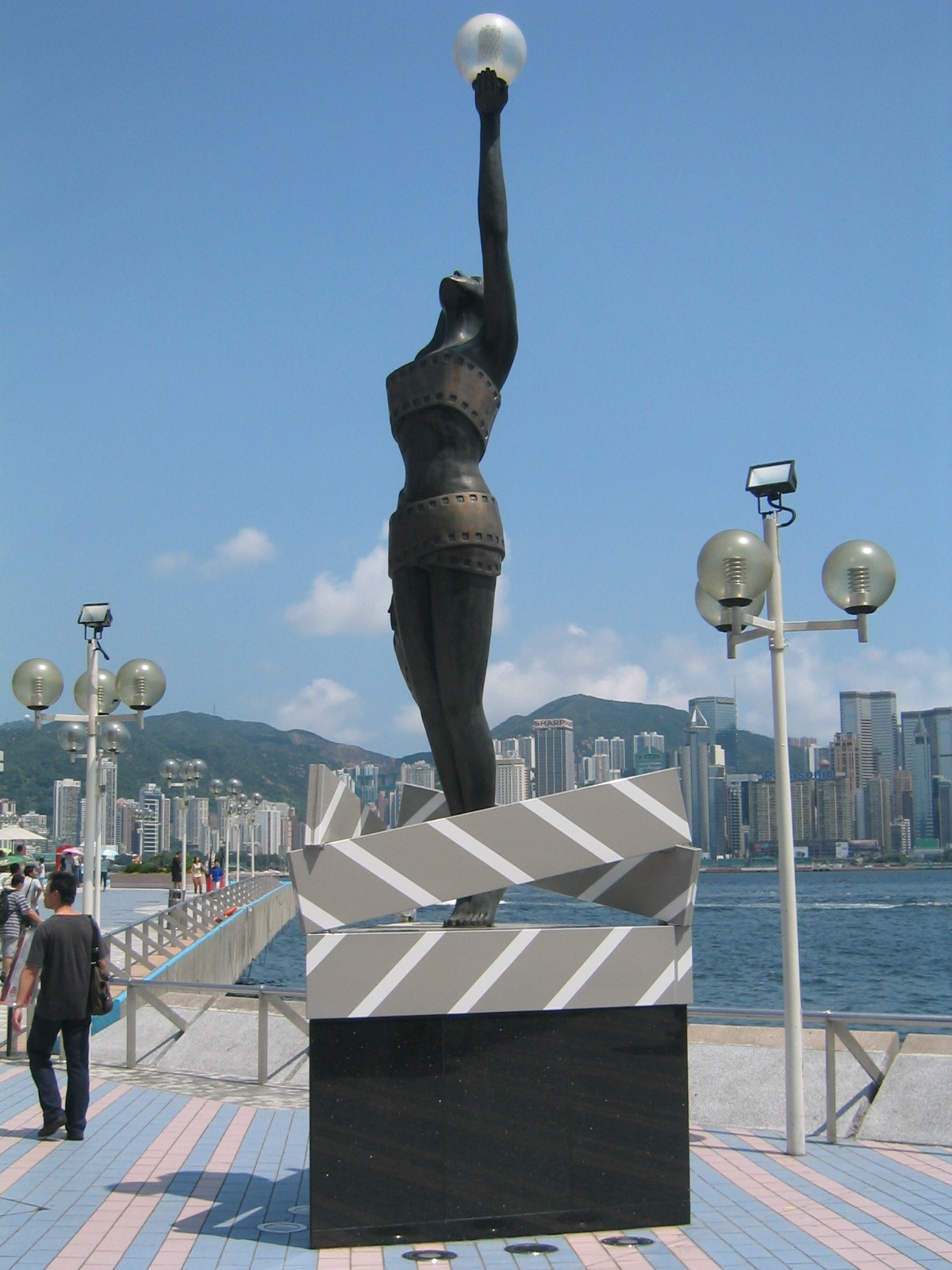

The Hong Kong Film Award for Lifetime Achievement (Chinese: 香港電影金像獎終身成就獎) is a special award presented at the Hong Kong Film Awards to recipients who have contributed greatly to the development of Hong Kong films.

== Recipients ==
Year	Recipient	Notes	Ref.
1983 (2nd)	Run Run Shaw	Film producer	
1995 (14th)	Man-lei Wong	Actress	
1999 (18th)	Leonard Ho	Film producer	
2001 (20th)	Bak Sheut-sin	Cantonese opera actress	
2002 (21st)	Chang Cheh	Film director	
2008 (27th)	Raymond Chow	Film producer	
2009 (28th)	Josephine Siao	Actress	
2010 (29th)	Lau Kar-leung	Director and actor	
2011 (30th)	Terry Lai Siu-ping	Founder of movie production and release company	
2012 (31st)	Ni Kuang	Screenwriter	
2013 (32nd)	Ng See-yuen	Film director	
2014 (33rd)	Cheung Sing-yim	Film director	
2016 (35th)	Li Li-hua	Actress	
2017 (36th)	Fong Yim-Fun	Actress	
2018 (37th)	Chor Yuen	Director, screenwriter, and actor	
2019 (38th)	Patrick Tse	Actor	
2022 (40th)	Michael Hui	Actor, comedian, scriptwriter, and director	
2023 (41st)	Bowie Woo	Actor	
2024 (42nd)	Sammo Hung	Actor, martial artist, producer, and director	
2025 (43rd)	Tsui Hark	Director, producer, screenwriter, and actor	
2025 (43rd)	Nansun Shi	Film producer and executive, and presenter	
2026 (44th)	John Chu Ka-yan	Visual effects producer	
