= The Way We Dance =

2013 Hong Kong film by Adam Wong

- Film poster
- Directed by: Adam Wong Sau Ping
- Written by: Adam Wong Sau Ping; Saville Chan; Chan Tai Lee
- Produced by: Saville Chan; Roddy Wong Yat-Ping
- Starring: Cherry Ngan; Babyjohn Choi; Lokman Yeung; Janice Fan; Tommy "Guns" Ly; Julian Gaertner
- Cinematography: Cheng Siu-Keung
- Edited by: Adam Wong; Kevin Chan
- Music by: Afuc Chan; Day Tai
- Production company: Eyes Front Pictures
- Distributed by: Golden Scene Company Limited; Film Development Fund (FDF) of Hong Kong; Sun Entertainment Culture Ltd, Hong Kong (now known as Sunny Side Up Culture Holdings Limited).
- Release dates: 31 March 2013 (Hong Kong International Film Festival); 8 August 2013 (Hong Kong)
- Running time: 110 minutes
- Country: Hong Kong
- Languages: Cantonese; English
- Box office: HK$5,982,996

The Way We Dance (狂舞派) is a 2013 Hong Kong film directed by Adam Wong Sau Ping and produced by Saville Chan and Roddy Wong Yat-Ping, choreography by Wong Wai-leung and Maverick Mak Chau Shing, stars Cherry Ngan, Babyjohn Choi, Lokman Yeung, Janice Fan and Tommy "Guns" Ly. The film was financed and distributed by Golden Scene Company Limited, with additional funding from Film Development Fund (FDF) of Hong Kong and Sun Entertainment Culture Limited Hong Kong (now known as Sunny Side Up Culture Holdings Limited). It premiered at the 37th Hong Kong International Film Festival and was released theatrically on 8 August 2013. The film was nominated for several awards at the 50th Golden Horse Awards and won multiple honors at the Hong Kong Film Awards, including Best New Director for Adam Wong and a nomination for Best Actress for Cherry Ngan.

== Plot ==
Fleur (played by Cherry Ngan), who grew up in her family's traditional tofu shop, has loved dancing since she was young. A hip-hop prodigy, her dream of pursuing dance has been suppressed under her family's traditional belief in prioritizing academic success.

Following her family's wishes, Fleur enrolls in university, where she finally breaks free from their traditional mindset. With her outstanding dance skills, she joins the university's dance club and becomes the rising star of the team 'BombA,' catching the attention of the popular club leader, Dave . 'BombA' is a well-liked dance crew on campus but has repeatedly lost in the dance competition 'Mo Lam Dance Tournament' to their rival team, 'Rooftoppers'.

While rigorously training to develop new dance moves to take on their long-time rivals, the 'Rooftoppers,' Fleur finds herself the target of revenge from her teammate Rebecca, who was once humiliated by Fleur during a high school dance performance. Rebecca resorts to stealing Fleur's love interest and stirring conflicts within the team. She mocks Fleur's dance style, eventually leading Fleur humiliated and heartbroken from losing both her love and her dream. Fleur angrily quit the team 'BombA.

One day, Alan, the president of the Tai Chi club, notices Fleur's ingenuity and coax her to join. At first, Fleur assumes that Tai Chi, like Alan himself, is outdated and old-fashioned. But when she discovers Alan's hidden past — that he was once incarcerated. With Tai Chi Alan Cleansed his heart and changed his life, helping others reform as well — her view of both Alan and Tai Chi completely changes. Over time, The two gradually grew close and sparks of romance began to fly. Inspired by Tai Chi, Fleur creates entirely new dance moves and pioneers her own unique street dance style.

At this time, Rebecca, pursuing her dream of becoming a cosplay star, changes her name to Momoko, quits the team to compete for the title of “Anime Baby” in hopes of reclaiming the spotlight she once had, and breaks up with Dave. Meanwhile, 'BombA' and Dave suffer a complete fall from grace after being hit with a tabloid scandal, leaving the team demoralized and scattered. In desperation, Dave begs Fleur to return to the crew to help them prepare for the upcoming 'Mo Lam Dance Tournament'. Fleur, moved by the plea and longing to return to the dance scene to fulfill her dream, agrees. However, she accidentally injures her leg due to Alan's jealous mishap and becomes unable to compete. Feeling defeated and on the verge of giving up her dream, Fleur is unexpectedly confronted by Stormy, the leader of rival crew 'Rooftoppers,' who appears in front of her wheelchair and reveals a shocking secret behind how 'Rooftoppers' has maintained their dominance in the dance world.

Stormy reveals that despite the 'Rooftoppers' dominance in the dance scene, their success relies not only on skill but also on a highly disciplined and collaborative training culture — something BombA has lost amid their internal conflicts. Inspired by this, Fleur realizes that true strength comes from unity, dedication, and authenticity. Determined not to be defeated by her injury, Fleur returns to the dance floor in her own way. Drawing from Tai Chi principles, she fuses its fluid movements with hip-hop, creating a brand-new dance style that reflects her personal journey.

With her performance and the renewed spirit of the team, Fleur helps BombA overcome their self-doubt. Despite physical limitations, her passion reignites the crew's morale. In the climactic showdown at the 'Mo Lam Dance Tournament', BombA faces off against the Rooftoppers. Fleur's fusion style becomes the highlight of the competition, earning widespread admiration.

In the end, while winning or losing becomes secondary, Fleur fulfills her dream of returning to the stage on her own terms. She rediscovers her love for dance, mends her relationship with Alan, and inspires others to pursue their passions fearlessly.

== Cast and roles ==
- Cherry Ngan: Fleur
- Babyjohn Choi: Alan
- Lokman Yeung: Dave
- Janice Fan: Rebecca
- Tommy "Guns" Ly: Stormy
- Julian Gaertner: Bruce

== Festival Screenings ==
- World premiere at the Hong Kong International Film Festival
- Opening film at Festival de Cine Fabuloso
- Competition film at the Udine Far East Film Festival
- Official selection at the Edinburgh International Film Festival
- Official selection at the 2013 Taipei Golden Horse Film Festival

== Release ==
The Way We Dance had its world premiere at the 2013 Hong Kong International Film Festival. The film was subsequently screened as the opening film of the 2013 Festival de Cine Fabuloso, and competed at the 2013 Udine Far East Film Festival in Italy, as well as the 2013 Edinburgh International Film Festival in Scotland. It was also featured at the 2013 Taipei Film Festival, and the 56th Asia-Pacific Film Festival in 2013.

The film was selected for the 2013 Focus on Asia Fukuoka International Film Festival in Japan, where it won the Audience Award.

The Way We Dance was released theatrically in Hong Kong on 8 August 2013.

== Awards and nominations ==
Awards and nominations
| Year | Award | Category | Recipient(s) / Nominee(s) | Result | Ref. |
|---|---|---|---|---|---|
| 2013 | 23rd Focus on Asia-Fukuoka International Film Festival | Audience Award | The Way We Dance | Won | |
| 2013 | 20th Hong Kong Film Critics Society Award | Films of Merit | The Way We Dance | Won | |
| 2014 | 33rd Hong Kong Film Awards | Best Original Film Song | "Let's Dance" (狂舞吧) – The Way We Dance; Composer: Day Tai; Lyricist: Saville Chan; Singer: Dough-Boy feat. Shimica Wong | Won | |
| 2014 | 33rd Hong Kong Film Awards | Best New Performer | Babyjohn Choi | Won | |
| 2014 | 33rd Hong Kong Film Awards | Best New Director | Adam Wong Sau Ping | Won | |
| 2014 | 33rd Hong Kong Film Awards | Best Actress | Cherry Ngan | Nominated | |
| 2013 | 50th Golden Horse Awards | Best Actress | Cherry Ngan | Nominated | |
| 2013 | 50th Golden Horse Awards | Best Action Choreography | Maverick Mak Chau Shing | Nominated | |
