= The White Storm =

2013 Hong Kong-Chinese film by Benny Chan

- China poster
- Traditional Chinese: 掃毒
- Simplified Chinese: 扫毒
- Literal meaning: Sweep Away the Poison
- Hanyu Pinyin: sǎo dú
- Jyutping: sou3 duk6
- Directed by: Benny Chan
- Screenplay by: Benny Chan; Manfred Wong; Ram Ling; Wong Chun; Tam Wai Ching
- Produced by: Benny Chan; Alvin Lam; Wendy Wong; Stephen Lam
- Starring: Sean Lau; Louis Koo; Nick Cheung; Yolanda Yuan; Lo Hoi-pang
- Cinematography: Anthony Pun (HKSC)
- Edited by: Yau Chi-wai (HKSE)
- Music by: Nicolas Errèra
- Production companies: Universe Entertainment; Sun Entertainment Culture Limited; Bona International Film Group; Sil-Metropole Organisation; Golala Investment Limited; Sirius Pictures
- Distributed by: Universe Films Distribution Company Limited
- Release dates: 25 October 2013 (Hong Kong Asian Film Festival); 29 November 2013 (China); 5 December 2013 (Hong Kong)
- Running time: 134 minutes
- Countries: Hong Kong; China
- Languages: Cantonese; Thai; English
- Budget: US$16,000,000
- Box office: US$44,670,277

The White Storm, formerly known as The Cartels War (Chinese: 掃毒) is a 2013 action film directed by Benny Chan. A Hong Kong-Chinese co-production, the film stars Sean Lau, Louis Koo, and Nick Cheung. The film had its world premiere at the 2013 Hong Kong Asian Film Festival on 25 October 2013.

A sequel titled The White Storm 2: Drug Lords was released on 16 July 2019, with Koo returning, Andy Lau joining the cast as well as producing and Herman Yau directing.

== Plot ==
Ma Ho-tin, So Kin-chow and Cheung Tsz-wai are good brothers who grew up together. They were stationed in the Narcotics Bureau of the Hong Kong Police Force after they grew up. Among the trio, Chow served as an undercover in the drug trafficking group for a long period of time under a constant state of anxiety which made him extremely annoyed. Big brother Tin and his detective brother Wai often persuade him that he can return to the team after catching the tracking down the most notorious drug lord. The high-level police decided to put on a longer investment in view of gaining a greater reward, which resulted in Chow's deep dissatisfaction. The last trio headed to Bangkok, after the biggest and most poisonous eight-faced Buddha and help Chow to escape. However, out of safety concerns, Chow was reluctant to conduct a fake drug transaction with the Eight-faced Buddha. He secretly telephoned the other party and said that the transaction was cancelled, and hence raised the suspicion of Eight-faced Buddha, who brought in free company to set an ambush. The war resulted in great casualties among the police from both Hong Kong and Thailand. During the nick of time, Tin was forced to make a decision between saving Chow and Wai, which resulted in him sacrificing the latter. Deeply saddened by the death of Wai, and out of guilt, Tin and Chow took care of Wai's aged and hospitalized mother, who was suffering from amnesia. Chow and his wife broke up following the birth of their daughter. Since then, the trio went their separate ways.

Five years later, Duen Kwan the rookie gang leader has assassinated Eight-faced Buddha's son. During the investigation, both Tin and Chow were surprised to learn that Wai had survived and even married Mina, the daughter of Eight-faced Buddha. Their brotherhood soon reconciled through trying to rescue Chow's kidnapped daughter. Both Chow and his wife got back together, and Wai revealed that he colluded with Duen to smoke out Eight-faced Buddha and have him eradicated. On the night of Eight-faced Buddha's son funeral, the trio and Eight-faced Buddha engaged in a life-and-death battle. The great showdown that took place in a basement bar resulted in the deaths of Eight-faced Buddha, his family and his free company, as well as Tin and Wai.

== Cast ==
- Sean Lau as Ma Ho-tin
- Louis Koo as So Kin-chow
- Nick Cheung as Cheung Tsz-wai
- Yuan Quan as Chloe Yuan
- Lo Hoi-pang as Wei Xin-guang / Eight-Faced Buddha
- Berg Ng as Wong Shun-yik
- Ken Lo as Bobby
- Treechada Malayaporn as Mina Wei
- Ben Lam as Hak Tsai
- Hugo Ng as M.D. Wong
- Marc Ma as Dune Kun
- Xing Yu as Kanit
- Law Lan as Tsz-wai's Mother
- Lee Siu-kei as Kei, Informer For Ho-tin
- Vithaya Pansringarm as Mr. Choowit
- Nut Keasanond as Sanit Wei
- Pacharapon Jantieng as Chatchai
- Chris Collins as Eight Faced Buddha Lead Mercenary

== Critical response ==
Andrew Chan of the Film Critics Circle of Australia writes, "The White Storm is easily the most entertaining (Hong Kong) film of the year, an edge of the seat thriller, smash buckling action affair and a powerhouse of acting experience".

== Awards and nominations ==
List of Accolades
Award / Film Festival	Category	Recipient(s)	Result
12th Changchun Film Festival	Best Cinematography	Anthony Pun	Nominated
12th Changchun Film Festival	Best Visual Effects	Ng Yuen-fai, Chow Chi-sing, Tam Kai-kwan	Nominated
12th Changchun Film Festival	Best Film Score	Nicolas Errèra	Won
33rd Hong Kong Film Awards	Best Film	The White Storm	Nominated
33rd Hong Kong Film Awards	Best Director	Benny Chan	Nominated
33rd Hong Kong Film Awards	Best Actor	Louis Koo	Nominated
33rd Hong Kong Film Awards	Best Actor	Sean Lau	Nominated
33rd Hong Kong Film Awards	Best Supporting Actress	Law Lan	Nominated
33rd Hong Kong Film Awards	Best Cinematography	Anthony Pun	Nominated
33rd Hong Kong Film Awards	Best Editing	Yau Chi-wai	Nominated
33rd Hong Kong Film Awards	Best Original Film Song	Song: "Tacit for Life" (心照一生) Composer: RubberBand; Lyrics: RubberBand, Tim Lui; Sung by: RubberBand	Nominated
32nd Hundred Flowers Awards	Best Actor	Nick Cheung	Nominated
32nd Hundred Flowers Awards	Best Supporting Actress	Yuan Quan	Nominated
32nd Hundred Flowers Awards	Best New Performer	Marc Ma	Won
51st Golden Horse Awards	Best Actor	Sean Lau	Nominated
51st Golden Horse Awards	Best Visual Effects	Ng Yuen-fai, Chow Chi-sing, Tam Kai-kwan	Nominated
51st Golden Horse Awards	Best Action Choreography	Nicky Li	Nominated
51st Golden Horse Awards	Best Cinematography	Anthony Pun	Nominated
51st Golden Horse Awards	Best Sound Design	Kinson Tsang, Yiu Chun-hin, Chow Yuk-lun	Nominated
51st Golden Horse Awards	Best Original Film Song	Song: "Tacit for Life" (心照一生) Composer: RubberBand; Lyrics: RubberBand, Tim Lui; Sung by: RubberBand	Nominated

== Sequel ==
On 16 March 2018, Universe Entertainment announced that a sequel of the film, titled The White Storm 2: Drug Lords, would start shooting during the summer and unveiled its teaser film poster. Being a sequel in name only with a similar thematic but a new storyline, Louis Koo returned playing a different role, making him the only returning cast member. Andy Lau joined the cast and also served as the film's producer, while Herman Yau replaced Benny Chan as the director for the sequel. Filming for The White Storm 2: Drug Lords took place in Hong Kong and the Philippines and the budget of the film was over HK$200 million. Production for The White Storm 2 - Drug Lords began on 23 June 2018 and was released on 16 July 2019.

== See also ==
- The White Storm (film series)
