= Broadway Circuit =

Movie theatre chain in Hong Kong

Broadway Theatre Company Limited
- Native name: 百老匯院線有限公司
- Company type: Private
- Founded: 1950
- Headquarters: Hong Kong
- Key people: 劉少文（執行董事）Lau Siu Man (Executive Director)
- Products: Cinema Operations

Broadway Circuit is one of the major cinema chains in Hong Kong. The first cinema was established in 1950, and in 1987, it was rebuilt on Sai Yeung Choi Street in Mong Kok, Kowloon. Over time, it has grown into the largest cinema chain in Hong Kong. The cinema chain is managed by Edko Films Ltd and operates under five brands: Broadway, PALACE, My Cinema, MOViE MOViE, and B+Cinema. Starting in 2006, it also managed Hong Kong’s AMC Theatres on behalf of AMC Theatres in the United States until the franchise agreement expired in 2020. Currently, the chain operates 14 cinemas across Hong Kong and Macau, with a market share of approximately 30% in Hong Kong (as of 2024).

Broadway Circuit operates five cinema brands in mainland China: Broadway, PALACE, PREMIERE, buff cinema, and MOViE MOViE, managing a total of 40 cinemas. It also runs the Kubrick bookstore, which specializes in film-related books.

Suntech International Management Limited
- Native name: 新達國際管理有限公司
- Company type: Private
- Founded: 1996
- Headquarters: Hong Kong
- Products: Cinema Operations
- Parent: Edko Films Ltd
- Website: （百老匯院線）

Broadway Circuit launched its official website in August 1999, offering online ticketing services and a platform for movie discussions. The chain also provides ticket booking services via phone.

== History ==
2016 Viewing Guidelines (Used from 2016 to 2018)

In the 1950s, businessman Kong Cho-yee operated the Broadway Theatre (Grand Theatre) in the Mong Kok district of Kowloon, which was later rebuilt into the HSBC Mongkok Building. His son, Bill Kong, reopened Broadway Theatre (Mini Cinema) in Mong Kok in 1987, marking the first cinema under the Broadway Circuit. The chain began expanding in the 1990s. In November 1996, the Broadway Cinematheque (commonly known as BC) was established.

In January 2006, AMC handed over the management of its cinema operations in Hong Kong to Suntech International Management Limited (referred to as Suntech), while retaining the original cinema names. Suntech, a subsidiary of Edko Films Ltd, also operates the Broadway Circuit in Hong Kong. The management of AMC cinemas continued under Suntech until the franchise agreement expired in 2020.

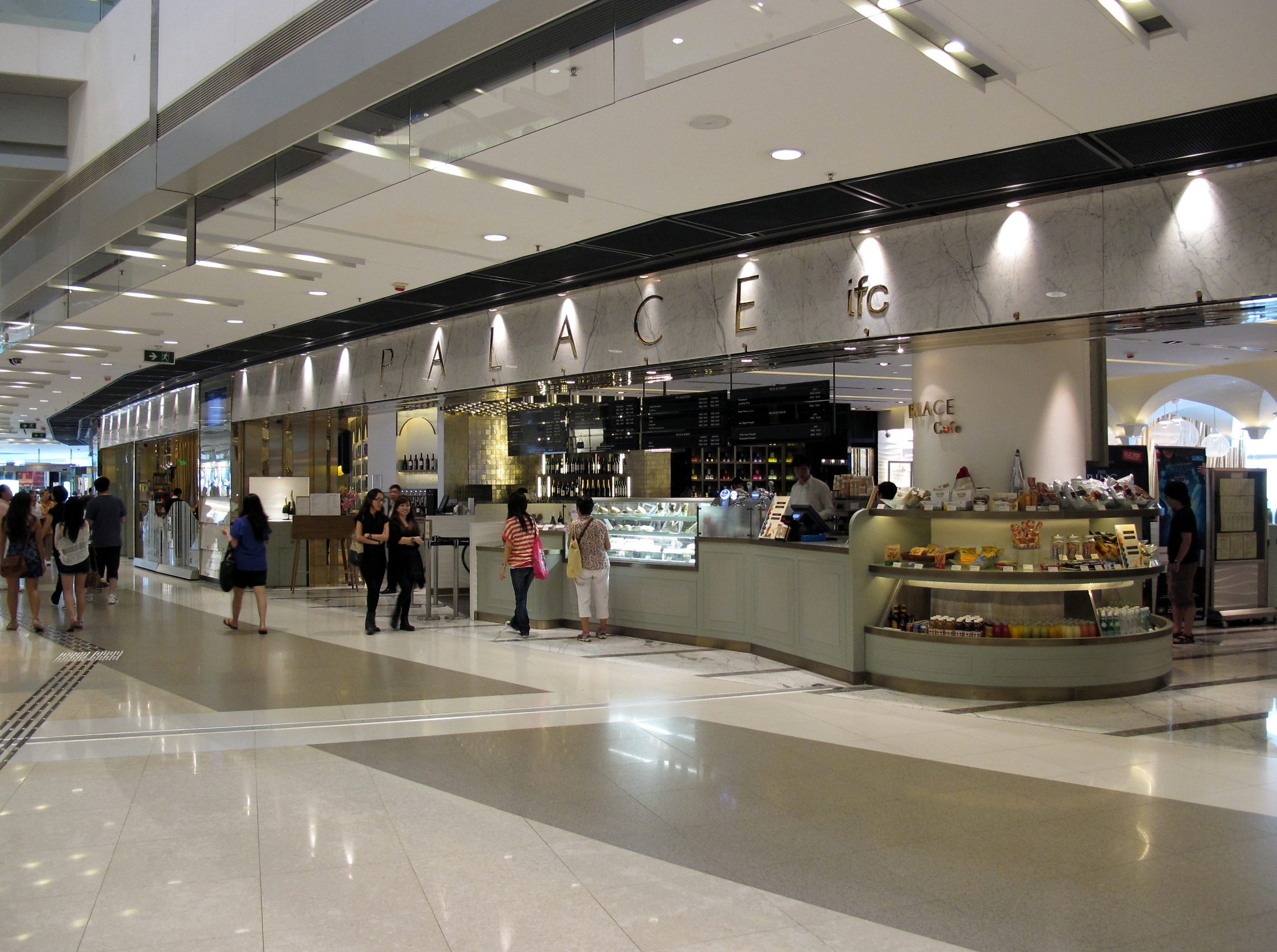
Palace IFC

On December 9, 2006, AMC Pacific Place opened at Pacific Place in Admiralty. The cinema features six screening halls with a total of approximately 600 seats, including a boutique screening room with just 39 seats, ideal for private gatherings. In December 2016, after six months of renovations, AMC Pacific Place reopened with a range of high-end cinema experiences. The upgrades included an natural design aesthetic, a variety of food options to delight patrons, a French cuisine pre-order service for VIP lounge guests, and upgrades to screening equipment and theater facilities. These enhancements aimed to provide audiences with a better movie-going experience.

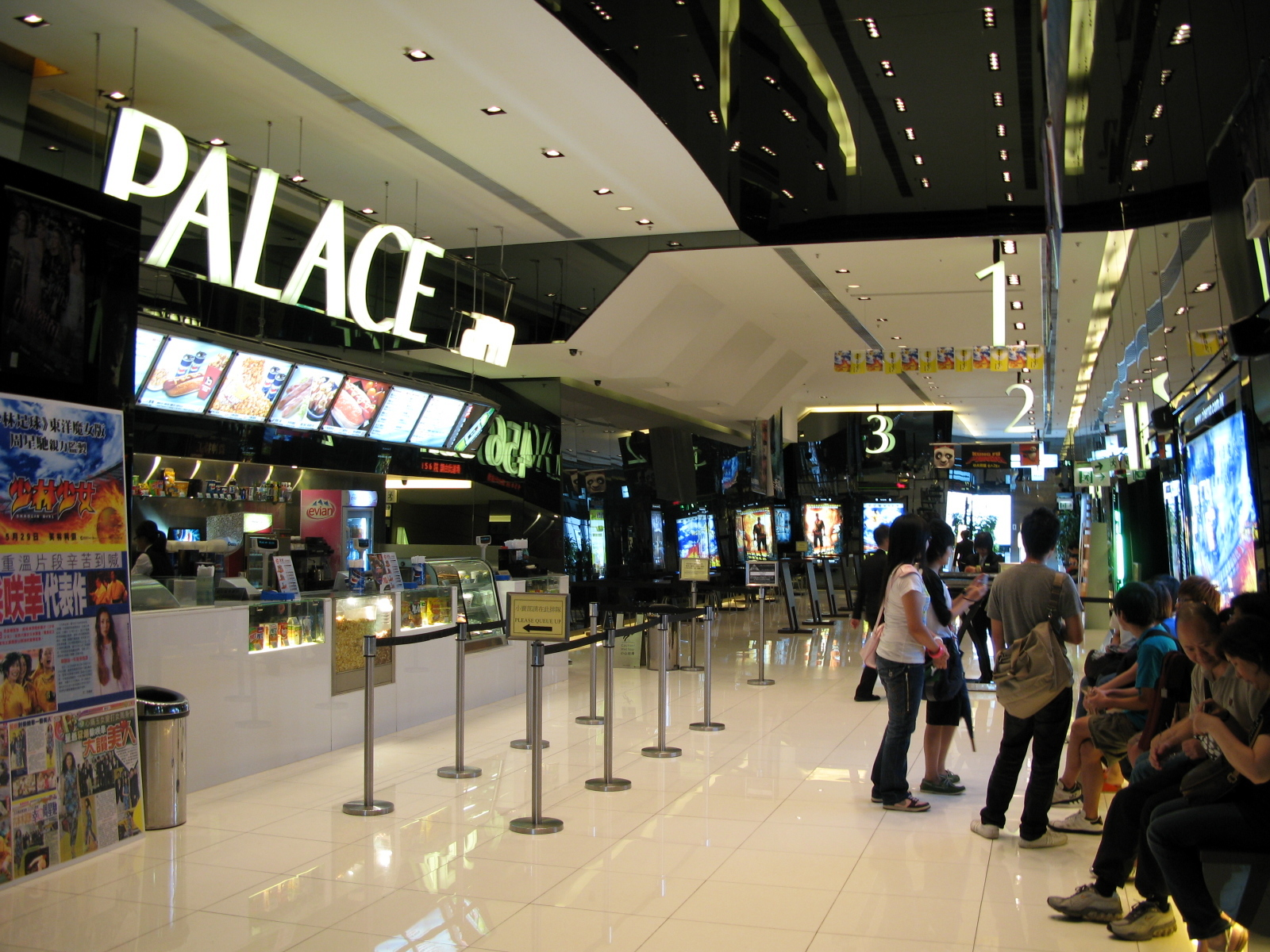
Palace apm

=== Faced a lawsuit ===
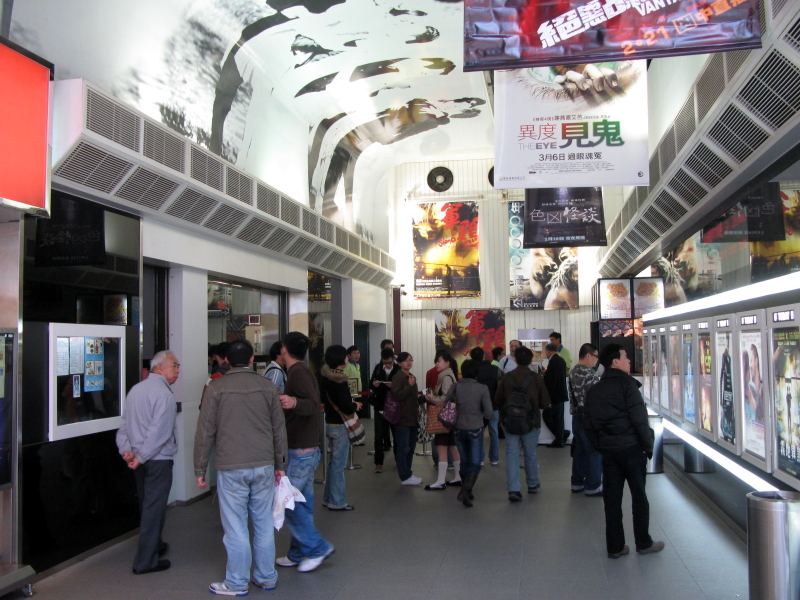
HK Broadway Mong Kok

In July 2020, MCL Kornhill Cinema faced two lawsuits from its landlord, Hang Lung Properties Real Estate Agency Limited, for overdue rent, amounting to over HK$1.61 million in total. A month later, the cinema at The ONE in Tsim Sha Tsui was also sued by its landlord for two months of unpaid rent, involving over HK$1.64 million. Broadway countersued The ONE, arguing that under the lease agreement and government-imposed social distancing regulations, the venue was rendered unusable, necessitating rent reductions or waivers. However, the landlord continuously demanded rent and carried out a series of seizures, ultimately forcing Broadway to pay the rent under duress. As a result, Broadway is seeking compensation of nearly HK$7.108 million.

In March 2021, construction company Idecor Asia Construction Limited filed a lawsuit against Edko Films Ltd and Broadway Circuit Ltd, seeking over HK$11.33 million, plus interest, for construction fees related to the MOViE MOViE cinema at Taikoo Shing.

=== Closed due to the pandemic ===
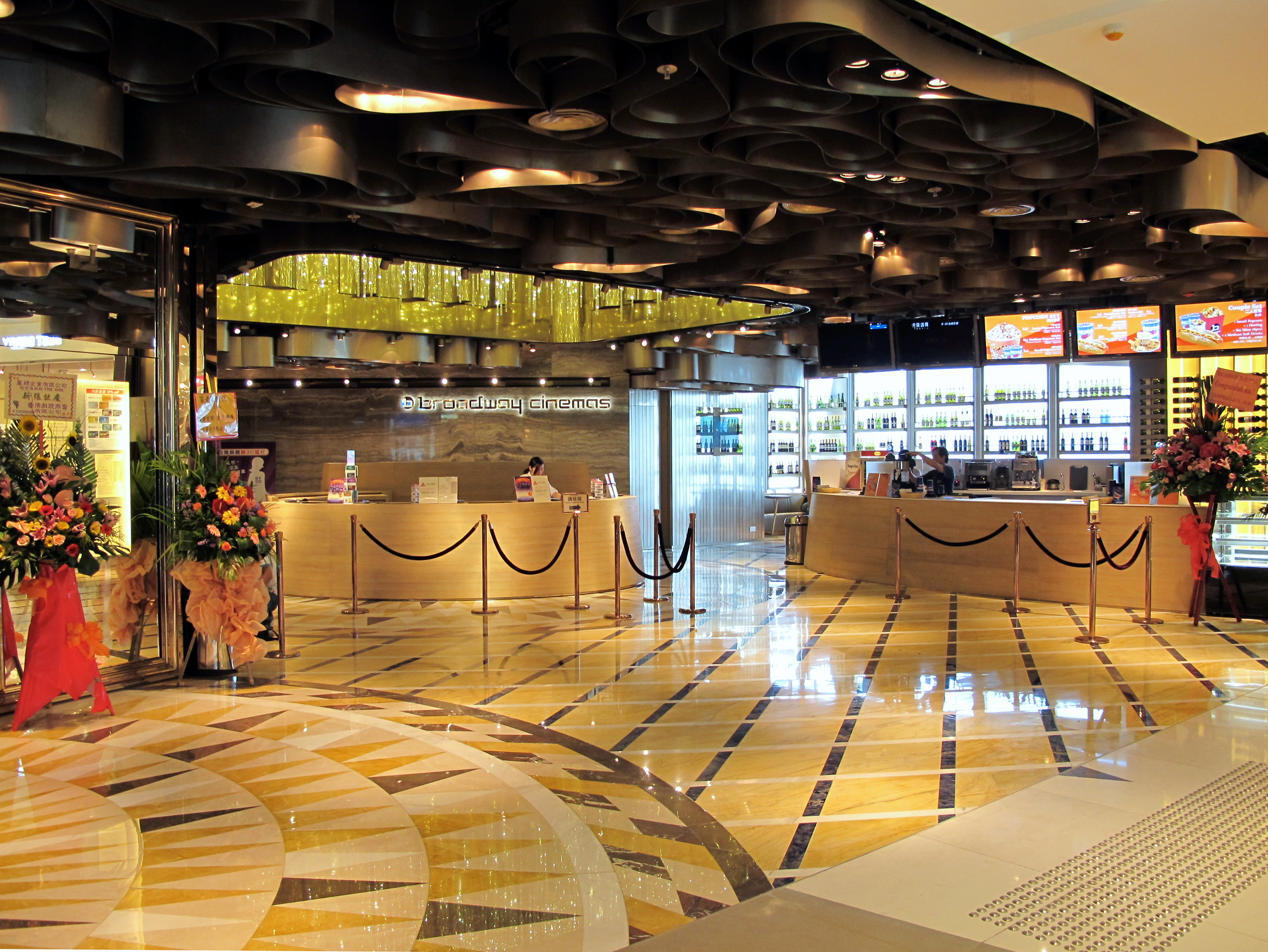
The ONE Cinema YOHO

Due to pandemic-related restrictions, cinemas were required to close. Broadway Circuit announced that its Broadway Cinema at Hollywood Plaza in Diamond Hill would cease operations upon the expiration of its lease in March 2022, citing the impact of the pandemic.
