= Fortune Pharmacal =

Hong Kong pharmaceutical company

- Company type: Private
- Industry: Pharmaceutical drugs
- Founder: Lai Yung-kwoon
- Headquarters: Chai Wan, Hong Kong

Fortune Pharmacal (Chinese: 幸福醫藥) is a Hong Kong pharmaceutical company founded in 1954. The company's products, which are manufactured in Hong Kong, are marketed in Hong Kong, China, Canada, and the United States.

== History ==
The company was founded in 1954 by Lai Yung-kwoon. His son, William Lai Yuen-fai, later took over as CEO.

== Production ==
The company's products are manufactured in Chai Wan. A new factory is scheduled to open in Yuen Long Industrial Estate in 2020.
