= Always on the Road =

Chinese anti-corruption miniseries

- Simplified Chinese: 永远在路上
- Hanyu Pinyin: Yǒngyuǎn zài lùshàng
- Created by: Central Commission for Discipline Inspection
- Country of origin: China
- Original language: Mandarin
- No. of seasons: 1
- No. of episodes: 8

Original release
- Release: 17 October – 25 October 2016

Always on the Road (Chinese: 永远在路上; pinyin: Yǒngyuǎn Zài Lùshàng), sometimes also translated as Never Ending Anti-Corruption Struggle, is an eight part television miniseries produced jointly by the propaganda department of the Chinese Communist Party (CCP) Central Commission for Discipline Inspection (CCDI) and China Central Television (CCTV). Released after the CCP's 18th National Congress, the program's primary focus is the CCP's crackdown under Xi Jinping against corruption in China by showcasing its prosecution of high level corrupt officials.

The program ran for one season, broadcast between 17 October 2016 and 25 October 2016 at 21:30 on CCTV-1. The entire show was immediately available online as it aired for free on the CCDI's official website, as well as on Youku and YouTube, where it was uploaded by the CCTV's official account.

== Name ==
According to Chinese state-run media, the name of the miniseries was meant to allude to the fact that China's anti-corruption drive is "longlasting". The name of the miniseries came from a quote said during a speech CCP general secretary Xi Jinping gave on January 12, 2016: "全面从严治党永远在路上。各级党组织要担负起全面从严治党主体责任。" ["The Chinese Communist Party is always working towards strict and comprehensive governance. Party organizations at all levels need to rise together and bear the responsibilities of strict governance."]

== Episode ==
No.	Original title	Pinyin
1	人心向背	Rénxīn xiàngbèi
2	以上率下	Yǐshàng lǜ xià
3	踏石留印	Tà shí liú yìn
4	利剑出鞘	Lì jiàn chū qiào
5	把纪律挺在前面	Bǎ jìlǜ tǐng zài qiánmiàn
6	拍蝇惩贪	Pāi yíng chéng tān
7	天网追逃	Tiān wǎng zhuī táo
8	标本兼治	Biāoběn jiānzhì

== People featured ==
Each episode features multiple convictions of allegedly corrupt Chinese Communist Party officials. Over 77 officials were featured, among whom were:

- Zhou Yongkang (former Politburo Standing Committee member and Secretary of the Central Political and Legal Affairs Commission) (Episode 1)
- Bai Enpei (former Party Committee Secretary of Yunnan Province) (Episode 1)
- Zhou Benshun (former Party Committee Secretary of Hebei Province) (Episode 1)
- Li Chuncheng (former Deputy Communist Party Secretary of Sichuan Province) (Episode 1)
- Gu Chunli (former vice governor of Jilin Province) (Episode 2)
- Wan Qingliang (former Party Committee Secretary of Guangdong Province and mayor of Guangzhou) (Episode 2)
- Wang Tianpu (former president of Sinopec, a state-owned energy company) (Episode 3)
- Yang Weize (former Party Committee Secretary of the city of Nanjing) (Episode 3)
- Nie Chunyu (former Party Committee Secretary of Shanxi Province) (Episode 4)
- Su Rong (former vice chairman of the Chinese People's Political Consultative Conference as well as former Party Committee Secretary of Qinghai, Gansu, and Jiangxi provinces) (Episode 4)
- Lü Xiwen (former Deputy Communist Party Secretary of Beijing) (Episode 5)
- Tan Qiwei (former vice-mayor of Chongqing) (Episode 8)
- Liu Tienan (former director of the National Energy Administration and deputy director of the National Development and Reform Commission) (Episode 8)
- Deng Qilin (former CEO of the Wuhan Iron and Steel Group) (Episode 8)
- Jiang Jiemin (former director of the State-owned Assets Supervision and Administration Commission) (Episode 8)

== Reception ==
Chinese state-run media, such as Xinhua and China Daily, released statements of glowing praise for the program, writing it "had the power" to "make the [anti-corruption] message really hit home."

Chris Buckely of The New York Times released a mostly positive review of the series, but noted that there were "limits to candor", such as the brief mentions of the highest convicted corrupt officials such as Zhou Yongkang. Further, Buckley noted that certain elements of corruption in China, such as the trading of military promotions and sex trafficking, went unmentioned, while the program mainly focused on gifts of luxury food products such as crocodile tail. Their review also mentioned that many Chinese Communist Party officials were ordered to watch the show.

Other Western media were harsher with their reviews. Quartz accused the CCP of forcing confessions to create the program.
