= Sha Tin Government Secondary School =

Secondary school in Hong Kong

Coordinates: 22°22′34″N 114°11′04″E

A map of Sha Tin Government Secondary School

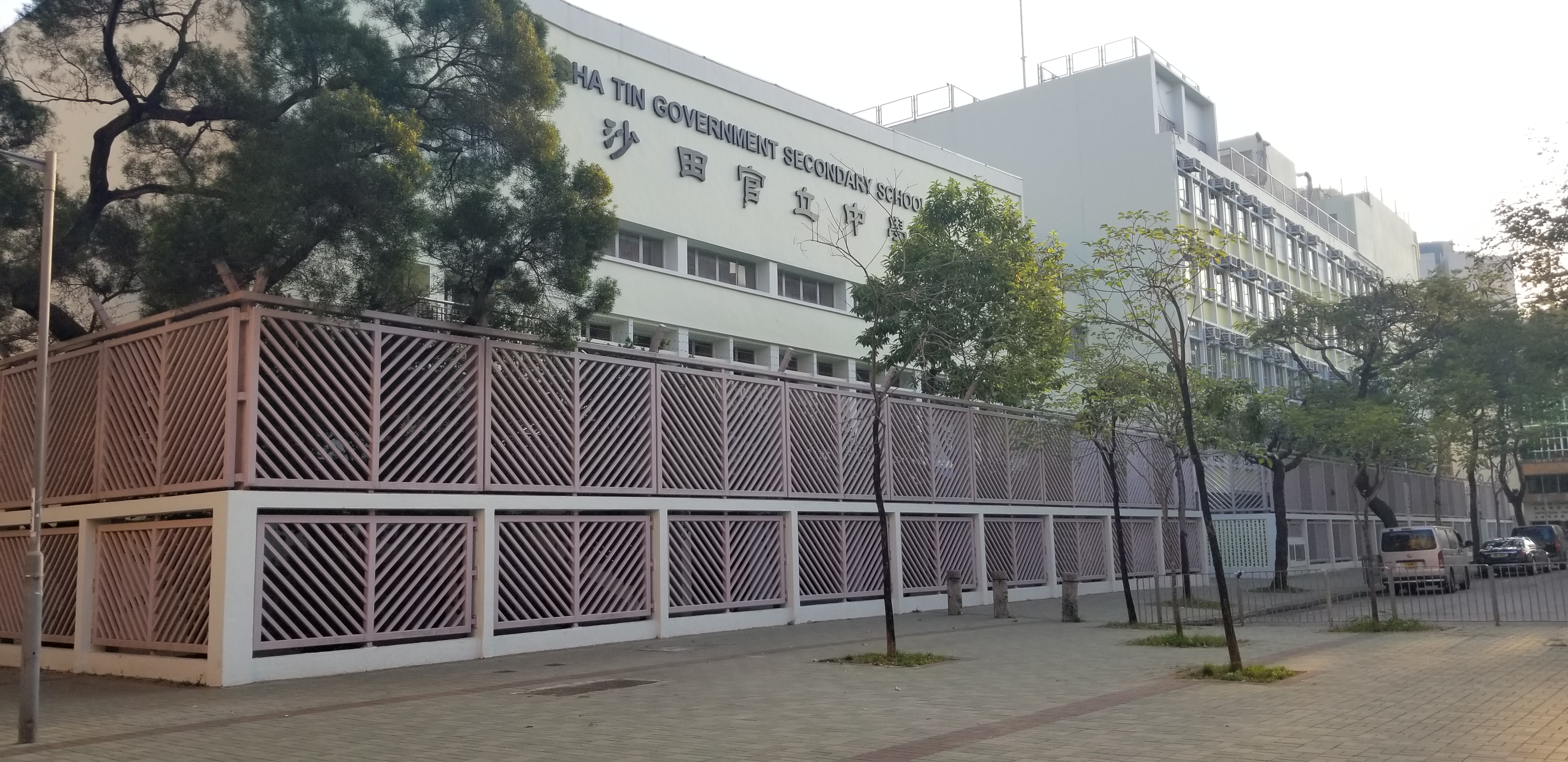
Sha Tin Government Secondary School

Sha Tin Government Secondary School (STGSS; 沙田官立中學) is located in Sha Tin, Hong Kong. There are 25 classes with an enrollment of approximately 800 students in the year 2025-26. The current principal is Ms. CHOI Fung-Man (蔡鳳雯)

== School information ==
=== Achievements ===
STGSS counts 6 winners (Pang Wai Sum Diana 1990, Luk Man Chung 1993, Yeung Chok Hang 1996, Chan Ting Ting 2006, Leung Ka Wing Connie 2007, Luk Man Ping Maggie 2010). In 2012, 4 senior students, Yiu Shing Fung (5C), Tai Tsz Long (6B), Tai Tsz Fung (6B) and Chen Kwan Kin (6C), were awarded Champion in the 45th Joint School Science Exhibition Proposal Competition and overall Champion in the 45th Joint School Science Exhibition ITC Innovation Award with the theme of "Disaster Counteraction Scientific Innovation".

=== School organisation ===
The school is a co-educational secondary school founded by the Hong Kong Government. School policies are basically devised in accordance with the educational ordinances and policies of the Education Bureau. The School Management Committee (SMC) is the top decision-making body. The chairperson is an official appointed by the Education Bureau. Other members include the school principal, two teachers' representatives, two parents' representatives, two alumni representatives and two independent members. The present chairperson of the SMC is Mrs. LI CHOW Yeuk-lan, Conny, Principal Education Officer, New Territories West, of the Education Bureau. The SMC is responsible for setting the direction of school development and managing the school budgets. The principal, with the help of three assistant principals, is responsible for the daily operation of the school.

=== Facilities ===
There are 32 classrooms, 4 science laboratories, 2 computer rooms, and a number of special rooms such as the English Room, Visual Arts Room, Geography Room, and Music Room. All classrooms are air-conditioned and are equipped with audio-visual facilities. The playground is accessible to all students for sports and leisure during recess, lunch and after school. Other facilities include the air-conditioned School Hall, which recently underwent renovation, Library, Lecture Theatre, Conference Room, Prefects' Room, Broadcasting Room, Social Worker's Room and Student Council Room.

==== The English Room ====
The English Room is a meeting place specially designated for the English Debating Club and the English Club of the school. National/Regional flags of several places are hung up on the wall of the English Room, including Hong Kong, Australia, New Zealand, Russia, Canada, China and the United Kingdom.

=== Language policy ===
The school has been using English as the medium of instruction (EMI) in all subjects except Chinese, Chinese Literature, Chinese History, Citizenship & Social Development and Putonghua. To help students to become biliterate in English and Chinese, and trilingual in English, Mandarin and Cantonese, and to encourage students to learn English and Mandarin their daily life, the school organizes an English Speaking Day every Western Festival and a Super Dinosaur Day per annum.

=== Information technology in education ===
Access to the Internet and Intranet is available in every classroom and special room. The school incorporates digital movie production in the computer curriculum in the junior levels.

== Alumni Association (STGSSAA) ==
The Sha Tin Government Secondary School Alumni Association (沙田官立中學校友會) was established in 1995 as a non-profit organization. It aims at promoting liaison between alumni, acting as a bridge between alumni and Sha Tin Government Secondary School and organizing activities for alumni.
