= RubberBand =

Hong Kong Cantopop band

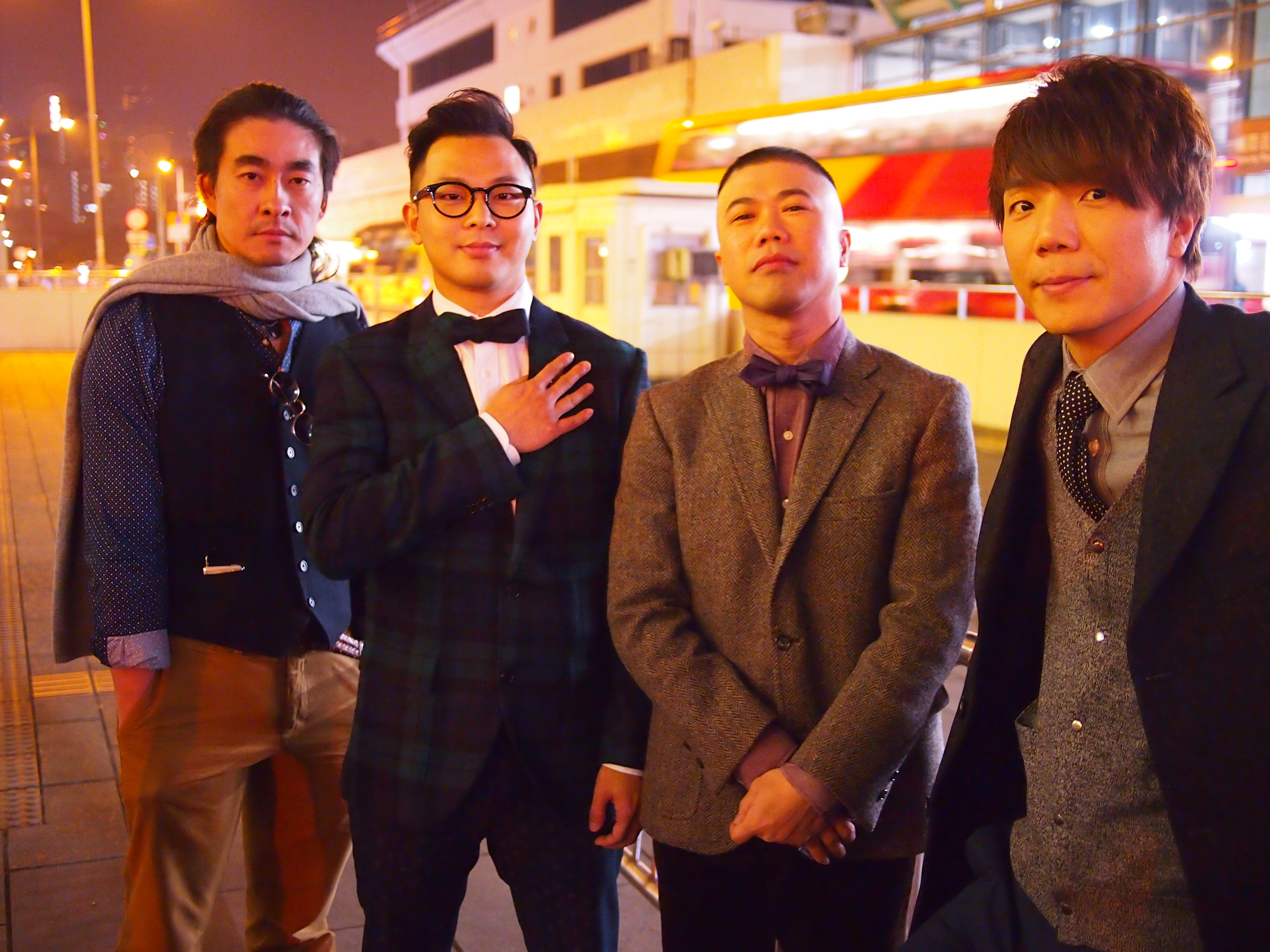
- RubberBand in 2015; From left to right: Clement Fung Ting-ching, Mau Hou-cheong, Lai Man-wang, and Lee Siu-wai

Background information
- Origin: Hong Kong
- Years active: 2006 - present
- Labels: Gold Typhoon; ASIA LP; R flat
- Members: Clement Fung Ting-ching; Lai Man-wang; Lee Siu-wai; Mau Hou-cheong
- Past members: Kelvin Ngai Sum

RubberBand is a Cantopop band based in Hong Kong, consisting of singer Mau Hou-cheong, guitarist Clement Fung Ting-ching, bassist Lee Siu-wai and drummer Lai Man-wang. Founded in 2005 as a five-member group, they signed with Gold Typhoon label in 2006. Keyboard player Kelvin Ngai Sum left the band in October 2010 due to health issues.

In February 2013, RubberBand signed with ASIA LP. The group became independent in 2018, starting their own music label called R flat.

RubberBand is known for their socially and politically charged lyrics. During the 2014 Hong Kong protests, the band expressed support for pro-democracy protestors.

== History ==
In 2006, the band took its music tapes to record companies. Mark Lui took notice of their music and signed them to Gold Typhoon.

In January 2022, local media reported that ten Canto-pop singers and groups had been put on a blacklist of government-funded broadcaster RTHK, with radio DJs having been ordered not to play their songs. RubberBand was reportedly on the list.

In March 2023, RubberBand announced their first ever world tour, titled Ciao. The tour will have stops in Western Europe, including performances in London, Manchester, Berlin and Amsterdam. According to lead singer Mau Hou-cheong, the band wanted to perform for the large number of Hongkongers who had emigrated from the city after 2019.

== Band members ==
=== Current members ===
- Clement Fung Ting-ching – guitar (2005–present)
- Lai Man-wang – drums (2005–present)
- Lee Siu-wai – bass (2005–present)
- Mau Hou-cheong – vocals (2005–present)

=== Former members ===
- Kelvin Ngai Sum – keyboards (2005–2010)

== Discography ==
To date the band has released 12 albums:

- Apollo 18 (2008)
- Beaming (2009)
- RubberBand Concert #1 (2010)
- Connected (2010)
- Dedicated To... (2011)
- Easy (2012)
- Frank (2014)
- ¿Frank? EP. (2014)
- We Are RubberBand (2015)
- Gotta Go (2016)
- Hours (2018)
- i (2020)
