= List of Hong Kong films of 2017 =

This article lists feature-length Hong Kong films released in 2017.

== Box office ==
The highest-grossing Hong Kong films released in 2017 by domestic box office gross revenue, are as follows:

Highest-grossing films released in 2017
Rank	Title	Domestic gross
1	Love Off the Cuff	HK$30,256,619
2	Shock Wave	HK$25,360,088
3	Journey to the West: The Demons Strike Back	HK$23,634,946
4	Chasing the Dragon	HK$18,726,261
5	Mad World	HK$16,923,985
6	The Yuppie Fantasia 3	HK$16,186,955
7	29+1	HK$15,249,951
8	77 Heartbreaks	HK$14,177,942
9	The Sinking City: Capsule Odyssey	HK$10,161,033
10	Paradox	HK$7,799,355

== Releases ==
Title	Director	Cast	Genre	Notes
29+1	Kearen Pang	Chrissie Chau, Joyce Cheng, Benjamin Yeung, Babyjohn Choi	Drama / Romance	In theaters 11 May 2017; Entered into the 2017 Osaka Asian Film Festival
77 Heartbreaks	Herman Yau	Charlene Choi, Pakho Chau, Michelle Wai, Anthony Wong, Gillian Chung, Kara Hui, Lawrence Cheng	Romance / Drama	In theaters 15 June 2017
The Adventurers	Stephen Fung	Andy Lau, Shu Qi, Zhang Jingchu, Tony Yang, Jean Reno	Action / Adventure	In theaters 24 August 2017
Always Be With You	Herman Yau	Louis Koo, Julian Cheung, Gordon Lam, Charlene Choi, Charmaine Sheh, Ava Yiu, Lam Suet	Horror	In theaters 26 October 2017
The Brink	Jonathan Li	Zhang Jin, Shawn Yue, Wu Yue, Gordon Lam, Janice Man	Action / Thriller	In theaters 28 September 2017
Chasing the Dragon	Jason Kwan; Wong Jing	Andy Lau, Donnie Yen	Crime	In theaters 28 September 2017
Cherry Returns	Chris Chow	Song Jia, Gordon Lam, Cherry Ngan, Hu Ge	Horror	In theaters 12 January 2017
Colour of the Game	Kam Ka-wai	Simon Yam, Jordan Chan, Philip Ng, Sabrina Qiu, Cheung Siu-fai, Kenny Wong, Lau Siu-ming, Waise Lee, Lam Suet, Oscar Leung, Hazel Tong	Action / Crime	In theaters 14 September 2017
Cook Up a Storm	Raymond Yip	Nicholas Tse, Jung Yong-hwa, Tiffany Tang, Michelle Bai	Comedy	In theaters 10 February 2017
Dealer/Healer	Lawrence Ah Mon	Sean Lau, Louis Koo, Zhang Jin, Gordon Lam, Patrick Tam, Jiang Yiyan	Action	In theaters 18 May 2017
The Empty Hands	Chapman To	Stephy Tang, Chapman To, Yasuaki Kurata, Stephen Au	Martial arts / Drama	In theaters 2 November 2017
Ghost Net		Carlos Chan, Jessica Kan, Justin Cheung, Joman Chiang, Ashina Kwok	Horror	In theaters 2 November 2017
The Helper	Joanna Bowers		Documentary	
Husband Killers	Fire Lee	Stephy Tang, Chrissie Chau, Gaile Lok	Action	In theaters 7 December 2017
Love Contractually	Liu Guonan	Sammi Cheng, Joseph Chang	Romantic comedy	In theaters 16 February 2017
Love Off the Cuff	Pang Ho-cheung	Miriam Yeung, Shawn Yue	Romantic comedy	In theaters 27 April 2017
Lucky Fat Man	Jill Wong	Bob Lam, Natalie Tong, Mak Ling-ling, Tommy Wong	Comedy	In theaters 19 January 2017
Manhunt	John Woo	Masaharu Fukuyama, Zhang Hanyu, Qi Wei, Ha Ji-won	Action / Thriller	In theaters 30 December 2017
Members Only	mic-GO Ngan	Yoyo Fung, Kyle Li, Carmen Soup, Bryant Mak, Christy Chan, Abrahim Chan, Celine Chung, Julius Brian Siswojo	Erotic / Drama	In theaters 31 August 2017
Meow	Benny Chan	Louis Koo, Ma Li	Sci-fi / Comedy	In theaters 20 July 2017
Mrs K	Ho Yunhang	Kara Hui, Simon Yam, Wu Bai, Faizai Hussein, Siow Li-xuan, Tony Liu, Dain Said, Fruit Chan, Kirk Wong	Action	In theaters 21 September 2017
Paradox	Wilson Yip	Louis Koo, Tony Jaa, Wu Yue, Gordon Lam, Chris Collins, Ken Lo	Action	In theaters 25 August 2017
Shock Wave	Herman Yau	Andy Lau, Jiang Wu, Philip Keung, Ron Ng, Song Jia, Babyjohn Choi, Louis Cheung, Felix Wong	Action	In theaters 20 April 2017; Entered into the 19th Far East Film Festival and 57th Vienna International Film Festival
The Sleep Curse	Herman Yau	Anthony Wong, Michelle Wai, Jojo Goh, Bryant Mak, Ikki Funaki	Horror	In theaters 26 May 2017
Son of the Neon Night	Juno Mak	Takeshi Kaneshiro, Tony Leung Ka-fai, Sean Lau, Louis Koo, Gao Yuanyuan, Alex To, Jiang Peiyao, Michelle Wai, Wyman Wong, Rose Maria Velasco, Carl Ng, Wilson Lam, Ching Tung, Tony Liu, Clement Fung, Lo Hoi-pang, Jerald Chan, Lowell Lo, Kam Kwok-leung, Paw Hee-ching, Jason Choi, Conan Lee, Wang Shunde	Crime	In theaters 28 December 2017
To Love or Not to Love	Crosby Yip	Edward Ma, Venus Wong, To Siu-kiu	Romantic drama comedy	In theaters 2 March 2017
Tomorrow Is Another Day	Chan Tai-lee	Teresa Mo, Ray Lui, Ling Man-lung	Drama	In theaters 12 April 2018; Entered into the 2017 Hong Kong Asian Film Festival
The Treasure	Gordon Chan; Ronald Cheng	Ronald Cheng, Dayo Wong, Fala Chen, Sharon Hsu, Sam Lee, Michael Wong	Comedy / Adventure	In theaters 2 November 2017
Vampire Cleanup Department	ToNick; Yan Pak-wing	Babyjohn Choi, Lin Min-chen, Chin Siu-ho, Richard Ng, Lo Mang, Bondy Chiu, Yuen Cheung-yan, Siu Yam-yam	Comedy / Action / Horror	In theaters 16 March 2017
With Prisoners	Wong Kwok-kuen	Kelvin Kwan, Neo Yau, Kimi Chiu, Ashina Kwok	Drama	In theaters 4 May 2017
The Yuppie Fantasia 3	Lawrence Cheng	Lawrence Cheng, Chrissie Chau, Larine Tang, Hedwig Tam, Babyjohn Choi, Anthony Chan, Louis Cheung, Manfred Wong, Peter Lai	Romantic comedy	In theaters 26 January 2017
Joshua: Teenager vs. Superpower	Joe Piscatella	Joshua Wong	Documentary	released on Netflix on 26 May 2017.

== See also ==
- 2017 in Hong Kong
