= 2017 in film =

2017 in film is an overview of events, including the highest-grossing films, award ceremonies, festivals, a list of films released, and notable deaths. Illumination celebrated its 10th anniversary.

== Evaluation of the year ==
Richard Brody of The New Yorker observed that for 2017,

the most important event in the world of movies was the revelation, in The New York Times and The New Yorker, of sexual abuse by Harvey Weinstein, and the resulting liberation of the long-stifled voices of the people who had been abused by him or other powerful figures in the movie business, and, for that matter, in other arts and industries, too.

He emphasizes that in effect, "[w]hat's missing from the year-end list, and from the era in movies, isn't only the unmade work by these filmmakers but the artistry and the careers of cast and crew members who would have been in their unrealized films."

== Highest-grossing films ==
The top films released in 2017 by worldwide gross are as follows:

Highest-grossing films of 2017
Rank	Title	Distributor	Worldwide gross
1	Star Wars: The Last Jedi	Disney	$1,332,539,889
2	Beauty and the Beast	Disney	$1,263,521,126
3	The Fate of the Furious	Universal	$1,236,005,118
4	Despicable Me 3	Universal	$1,034,799,409
5	Jumanji: Welcome to the Jungle	Sony	$962,077,546
6	Spider-Man: Homecoming	Sony	$880,166,924
7	Wolf Warrior 2	United Entertainment	$870,325,439
8	Guardians of the Galaxy Vol. 2	Disney	$869,087,963
9	Thor: Ragnarok	Disney	$853,983,911
10	Wonder Woman	Warner Bros.	$822,303,505

Star Wars: The Last Jedi, Beauty and the Beast, The Fate of the Furious, and Despicable Me 3 have each grossed over $1 billion, making them among the highest-grossing films of all time, with the latter being the fourth-highest-grossing animated film.

Wolf Warrior 2, a Chinese film, became the first non-Hollywood film to be listed on the all-time worldwide top 100 box office.

Split, by M. Night Shyamalan, was the year's most profitable film in terms of return on investment (ROI), having generated over 2,000% ROI. It is the 11th film to cross 2,000% ROI, and the first film to do so since 2015.

=== 2017 box office records ===
- In China, the country recorded a new single-day record as well as an all-time admission high on Saturday, January 28, with over ¥755 million (US$110 million) registering an admission of over 21 million moviegoers, beating the previous record of ¥647 million ($98.4 million) and 17 million admissions set the previous year. Both records were set on the first day of the Chinese New Year.
- In May, China had its first consecutive monthly gain in box office revenue in more than a year, led by Indian film Dangal, followed by Hollywood film Pirates of the Caribbean: Dead Men Tell No Tales.
- 2017 has been a record year for non-Hollywood foreign films in the Chinese market, with the success of films such as India's Dangal, Thailand's Bad Genius and Spain's Contratiempo. As of November 5, 2017, non-Hollywood imports account for 72% ($519.7 million) of the year's foreign film box office revenue so far ($723 million), with Dangal alone accounting for 27% ($195.8 million).
- The Marvel Cinematic Universe became the first film franchise to gross more than $11 billion with the release of Guardians of the Galaxy Vol. 2. With the subsequent release of Spider-Man: Homecoming, it became the first film franchise to gross more than $12 billion, and with the release of Thor: Ragnarok, the MCU became the first film franchise to gross more than $13 billion. It also became the first film franchise to release three movies in one year that all made over $800 million worldwide and opened to over $100 million domestically (through the aforementioned entries).
- The Despicable Me franchise became the highest-grossing animated franchise ever ($3.6 billion), surpassing the Shrek franchise; it became the second non-Disney animated film to reach 1 billion dollars worldwide; it also became the first animated franchise to have two films hit over $1 billion.
- With Star Wars: The Last Jedi, Beauty and the Beast, and Wonder Woman, 2017 was the first year since 1958 (South Pacific, Auntie Mame, Cat on a Hot Tin Roof) in which the top 3 highest grossing domestic films were female-led.
- Wolf Warrior 2 was a massive commercial success and became the highest-grossing Chinese film ever released. The film broke numerous box office records, including the biggest single-day gross for a Chinese film as well as the fastest film to cross the RMB 2 billion, 3 billion, 4 billion and 5 billion box office marks. It also became the fastest film to surpass US$500 million and the first film to gross more than US$600 million at the Chinese box office. At a total domestic gross of CN¥5.68 billion (US$874 million), it is the second-highest-grossing film of all time in a single market behind only Star Wars: The Force Awakens ($936.7 million in North America), and having exceeded North America's totals from Avatar ($760 million), Titanic ($659 million) and Jurassic World ($652 million). The film was the sixth highest-grossing film of 2017 at US$874 million, making it the 54th-highest-grossing film worldwide. It is the first and only Chinese film ever to be included in the list of 100 all-time highest-grossing films worldwide. It was selected as the Chinese entry for the Best Foreign Language Film at the 90th Academy Awards.

==== Studio records ====
- Walt Disney Studios became the first studio ever to reach $6 billion at the global box office in consecutive years (following a $7.6 billion gross in 2016), and the first studio to reach $5 billion globally in three consecutive years.

==== Film records ====
- In China, the film Wolf Warrior 2 became the fastest film to reach 2 and 3 billion yuan, as well as the first to reach 4 and 5 billion yuan. It is China's highest-grossing film, as well as the highest-grossing non-Hollywood film.
- Dangal became the highest-grossing Indian film, crossing ₹20 billion (US$210 million) worldwide, making it the first Indian film to gross $300 million worldwide. Dangal is also the highest-grossing sports film. Most of its gross ($194.71 million) came from China, where it became the highest-grossing non-Hollywood foreign film, surpassing Japanese anime film Your Name. Dangal also became the highest-grossing non-English foreign film in any single market (China), surpassing the gross of previous record holder Crouching Tiger, Hidden Dragon (2000) which grossed $128 million in North America.
- In India, Baahubali 2: The Conclusion became the highest-grossing film with a gross collection of ₹14.169 billion ($218 million) in the country. It also became the first Indian movie to gross more than $200 million. The film broke a numerous domestic records, and also became the second-highest-grossing Indian film of all time with an estimated gross of ₹17.97 billion ($275 million) only behind Dangal.
- Resident Evil: The Final Chapter scored the biggest three-day (Friday to Sunday) opening in China with an estimated ¥636.9 million ($92.7 million) debut.
- Beauty and the Beast broke Batman v Superman: Dawn of Justice's records ($166 million) for the highest weekend debut in March ($174.8 million) and for a spring release, The Lorax's record ($70.4 million) for the highest weekend debut for a musical film, Pitch Perfect 2's record ($69.2 million) for the highest weekend debut for a live-action musical film, and Harry Potter and the Deathly Hallows – Part 2's record ($169.2 million) for the highest weekend debut for a live-action fantasy film.
- The Fate of the Furious broke Jurassic World's record ($316.6 million) of largest foreign weekend debut ($432.3 million) and Star Wars: The Force Awakens' record ($529 million) of largest worldwide weekend debut ($541 million).
- Wonder Woman, directed by Patty Jenkins, grossed $103.3 million in its opening weekend, breaking the record for a female-directed film previously held by Fifty Shades of Grey, directed by Sam Taylor-Johnson ($85.2 million on 13–15 February 2015); the film also became the highest-grossing World War I film, surpassing War Horse ($79.9 million on 25–28 December 2011). It also became the highest-grossing superhero origin film. Overall, it is the highest-grossing female-directed film, surpassing Phyllida Lloyd's Mamma Mia! ($609.8 million).
- Despicable Me 3 broke The Twilight Saga: Eclipse's 4,468 theater count with a theater count of 4,529 theaters in its first week. It would have six more theaters in its second week, going to 4,535 theaters.
- Dunkirk grossed $525.6 million, making it the highest-grossing World War II film of all time, surpassing Saving Private Ryan ($481.8 million).
- It broke Hotel Transylvania 2's record for largest September opening weekend ($48.5 million), and Gravity's record for largest fall opening weekend ($55.8 million) when it opened to $123.4 million and, subsequently, went on to become the unadjusted highest-grossing horror film in history, surpassing The Sixth Sense ($672.8 million). It is currently the third-highest-grossing R-rated film, after Deadpool and The Matrix Reloaded.
- Star Wars: The Last Jedi grossed $104.7 million in its opening day, becoming only the second movie (along with Star Wars: The Force Awakens) to gross more than $100 million in a single day, and making the Star Wars franchise the first film series to include two movies that recorded $100 million grossing days. On December 30, Last Jedi surpassed a billion dollars at the global box office, making Star Wars the first franchise to release three consecutive billion-dollar-grossing films and the first franchise to release billion-dollar-grossing films in three consecutive years (along with 2015's Force Awakens and 2016's Rogue One). Last Jedi also became the fourth Star Wars film to gross more than $1 billion, tying the Star Wars franchise with the Marvel Cinematic Universe for most billion-dollar films within a single franchise.
- 2017 breaks 2016's record for films that crossed over $500 million, with nineteen: the ten films in the table above, as well as Coco, Pirates of the Caribbean: Dead Men Tell No Tales, It, Justice League, Logan, Transformers: The Last Knight, Kong: Skull Island, The Boss Baby, and Dunkirk. 2017 also broke 2016's record of films that crossed over $600 million with sixteen (Coco, Pirates of the Caribbean: Dead Men Tell No Tales, It, Justice League, Logan, and Transformers: The Last Knight have all grossed over $600 million). It also surpasses 2016's record of films that earned over $700 million worldwide with thirteen consecutive films. (Coco, Pirates of the Caribbean: Dead Men Tell No Tales, and It have grossed over $700 million.) It additionally surpasses 2016's record of films that earned over $800 million worldwide with eleven, those being the ten in the table above and Coco (it also becomes the first year in history where every one of the top 10 highest-grossing films grossed over $800 million worldwide).

== Events ==
- February 15, 2017 - Universal Pictures acquires a minority stake in Amblin Partners, strengthening the relationship between Universal and Amblin, and reuniting a minority percentage of the live-action DreamWorks Pictures label with its former DreamWorks Animation division, which Comcast and NBCUniversal acquired the year prior in 2016.

=== Award ceremonies ===
Date	Event	Host	Location	Ref.
January 8	74th Golden Globe Awards	Hollywood Foreign Press Association	Beverly Hills, California, U.S.	
January 14	62nd Filmfare Awards	The Times Group	Mumbai, India	
January 22	36th London Film Critics Circle Awards	The Critics' Circle	London, U.K.	
January 23	52nd Guldbagge Awards	Swedish Film Institute	Djurgården, Sweden	
January 28	Producers Guild of America Awards 2016	Producers Guild of America	Beverly Hills, California, U.S.	
January 29	9th Gaudí Awards	Catalan Film Academy	Barcelona, Catalonia, Spain	
January 29	23rd Screen Actors Guild Awards	Screen Actors Guild-American Federation of Television and Radio Artists	Los Angeles, California, U.S.	
January 30	22nd Lumière Awards	Académie des Lumières	Paris, France	
February 4	44th Annie Awards	ASIFA-Hollywood	Los Angeles, California, U.S.	
February 4	31st Goya Awards	Academy of Cinematographic Arts and Sciences of Spain	Madrid, Spain	
February 4	7th Magritte Awards	Académie André Delvaux	Brussels, Belgium	
February 4	69th Directors Guild of America Awards	Directors Guild of America	Los Angeles, California, U.S.	
February 8	African-American Film Critics Association Awards 2016	African-American Film Critics Association	Hollywood, California, U.S.	
February 10	25th Movieguide Awards Gala	Movieguide	Hollywood, California, U.S.	
February 12	70th British Academy Film Awards	British Academy of Film and Television Arts	London, England, UK	
February 19	Writers Guild of America Awards 2016	Writers Guild of America	Manhattan, New York, U.S. and Los Angeles, California, U.S.	
February 24	42nd César Awards	Academy of Cinema Arts and Techniques	Paris, France	
February 25	32nd Independent Spirit Awards	Independent Spirit Awards	Santa Monica, California, U.S.	
February 25	37th Golden Raspberry Awards	Golden Raspberry Awards	Hollywood, California, U.S.	
February 26	89th Academy Awards	Academy of Motion Picture Arts and Sciences	Hollywood, California, U.S.	
March 8	Dorian Awards Winners Toast	Gay and Lesbian Entertainment Critics Association	Los Angeles, California, U.S.	
March 11	30th Kids' Choice Awards	Galen Center	Los Angeles, California, U.S.	
May 7	2017 MTV Movie & TV Awards	MTV	Los Angeles, California, U.S.	
June 28	43rd Saturn Awards	Academy of Science Fiction, Fantasy and Horror Films	Burbank, California, U.S.	
July 22	4th Platino Awards	EGEDA, FIPCA	Madrid, Spain	

== Awards ==
Category/Organization	75th Golden Globe Awards January 7, 2018		23rd Critics' Choice Awards January 11, 2018	Producers, Directors, Screen Actors, and Writers Guild Awards	71st BAFTA Awards February 18, 2018	90th Academy Awards March 4, 2018
Category/Organization	Drama	Musical or Comedy	23rd Critics' Choice Awards January 11, 2018	Producers, Directors, Screen Actors, and Writers Guild Awards	71st BAFTA Awards February 18, 2018	90th Academy Awards March 4, 2018
Best Film	Three Billboards Outside Ebbing, Missouri	Lady Bird	The Shape of Water		Three Billboards Outside Ebbing, Missouri	The Shape of Water
Best Director	Guillermo del Toro; The Shape of Water					
Best Actor	Gary Oldman; Darkest Hour	James Franco; The Disaster Artist	Gary Oldman; Darkest Hour			
Best Actress	Frances McDormand; Three Billboards Outside Ebbing, Missouri	Saoirse Ronan; Lady Bird	Frances McDormand; Three Billboards Outside Ebbing, Missouri			
Best Supporting Actor	Sam Rockwell; Three Billboards Outside Ebbing, Missouri					
Best Supporting Actress	Allison Janney; I, Tonya					
Best Screenplay, Adapted	Martin McDonagh; Three Billboards Outside Ebbing, Missouri		James Ivory; Call Me by Your Name			
Best Screenplay, Original	Martin McDonagh; Three Billboards Outside Ebbing, Missouri		Jordan Peele; Get Out		Martin McDonagh; Three Billboards Outside Ebbing, Missouri	Jordan Peele; Get Out
Best Animated Film	Coco					
Best Original Score	Alexandre Desplat; The Shape of Water			—N/a	Alexandre Desplat; The Shape of Water	
Best Original Song	"This Is Me"; The Greatest Showman		"Remember Me"; Coco	—N/a	—N/a	"Remember Me"; Coco
Best Foreign Language Film	In the Fade			—N/a	The Handmaiden	A Fantastic Woman
Best Documentary (Note: From 2016 onward, the category was shifted from the Critics' Choice Awards to the ancillary Critics' Choice Documentary Awards.)	—N/a	—N/a	Jane		I Am Not Your Negro	Icarus

Palme d'Or (70th Cannes Film Festival):

The Square, directed by Ruben Östlund, Sweden

Golden Lion (74th Venice International Film Festival):

The Shape of Water, directed by Guillermo del Toro, United States

Golden Bear (67th Berlin International Film Festival):

On Body and Soul (Testről és lélekről), directed by Ildikó Enyedi, Hungary

== 2017 films ==
=== By country/region ===
- List of American films of 2017
- List of Argentine films of 2017
- List of Australian films of 2017
- List of Bangladeshi films of 2017
- List of Brazilian films of 2017
- List of British films of 2017
- List of Canadian films of 2017
- List of Chinese films of 2017
- List of French films of 2017
- List of Hong Kong films of 2017
- List of Indian films of 2017
  - List of Assamese films of 2017
  - List of Bollywood films of 2017
  - List of Punjabi films of 2017
  - List of Bengali films of 2017
  - List of Gujarati films of 2017
  - List of Kannada films of 2017
  - List of Malayalam films of 2017
  - List of Marathi films of 2017
  - List of Tamil films of 2017
  - List of Telugu films of 2017
  - List of Tulu films of 2017
- List of Japanese films of 2017
- List of Nepali films of 2017
- List of Pakistani films of 2017
- List of Portuguese films of 2017
- List of Russian films of 2017
- List of South Korean films of 2017
- List of Spanish films of 2017
- List of Turkish films of 2017

=== By genre/medium ===
- List of action films of 2017
- List of animated feature films of 2017
- List of avant-garde films of 2017
- List of comedy films of 2017
- List of drama films of 2017
- List of horror films of 2017
- List of science fiction films of 2017
- List of thriller films of 2017
- List of western films of 2017

== Deaths ==
Month	Date	Name	Age	Country	Profession	Notable films
January	6	Les Lazarowitz	75	US	Sound Engineer	Taxi Driver; Raging Bull
January	6	Om Puri	66	India	Actor	Gandhi; East Is East
January	6	Francine York	80	US	Actress	Cannon for Cordoba; The Doll Squad
January	9	Teresa Ann Savoy	61	UK	Actress	Caligula; Private Vices, Public Pleasures
January	10	Manlio Rocchetti	73	Italy	Makeup Artist	Driving Miss Daisy; Gangs of New York
January	12	William Peter Blatty	89	US	Screenwriter, Director	The Exorcist; The Ninth Configuration
January	13	Dick Gautier	85	US	Actor	Divorce American Style; Fun with Dick and Jane
January	19	Miguel Ferrer	61	US	Actor	RoboCop; Mulan
January	23	Gorden Kaye	75	UK	Actor	Brazil; Jabberwocky
January	25	Kevin Geer	64	US	Actor	The Pelican Brief; The Contender
January	25	John Hurt	77	UK	Actor	The Elephant Man; Alien
January	25	Mary Tyler Moore	80	US	Actress	Ordinary People; Thoroughly Modern Millie
January	26	Mike Connors	91	US	Actor	The Ten Commandments; Sudden Fear
January	26	Barbara Hale	94	US	Actress	Airport; The Oklahoman
January	27	Robert Ellis Miller	89	US	Director	Reuben, Reuben; Sweet November
January	27	Emmanuelle Riva	89	France	Actress	Amour; Hiroshima mon amour
January	27	Gisella Sofio	85	Italy	Actress	Rascel-Fifì; Accidents to the Taxes!!
January	27	Frank Tidy	84	UK	Cinematographer	The Duellists; Under Siege
January	28	Richard Portman	82	US	Sound Engineer	The Godfather; Star Wars
January	31	Frank Pellegrino	72	US	Actor	Goodfellas; Mickey Blue Eyes
February	5	Björn Granath	70	Sweden	Actor	Pelle the Conqueror; Eye of the Eagle
February	6	Irwin Corey	102	US	Actor	The Curse of the Jade Scorpion; Jack
February	6	Alec McCowen	91	UK	Actor	Frenzy; Gangs of New York
February	6	Roy Forge Smith	87	UK	Production Designer	Monty Python and the Holy Grail; Teenage Mutant Ninja Turtles
February	7	Richard Hatch	71	US	Actor	Charlie Chan and the Curse of the Dragon Queen; Party Line
February	7	Gianfranco Plenizio	76	Italy	Composer	And the Ship Sails On; The Sensuous Nurse
February	13	Gerald Hirschfeld	95	US	Cinematographer	Young Frankenstein; Fail Safe
February	13	Seijun Suzuki	93	Japan	Director	Branded to Kill; Tokyo Drifter
February	18	Pasquale Squitieri	78	Italy	Director, Screenwriter	I Am the Law; Corleone
February	21	Brunella Bovo	84	Italy	Actress	The White Sheik; Miracle in Milan
February	22	Nikos Koundouros	90	Greece	Director, Screenwriter	Young Aphrodites; The Ogre of Athens
February	25	Neil Fingleton	36	UK	Actor	47 Ronin; Jupiter Ascending
February	25	Bill Paxton	61	US	Actor	Twister; Aliens
February	28	Euel Box	88	US	Composer	Benji; Hawmps!
March	3	Míriam Colón	80	Puerto Rico	Actress	Scarface; Lone Star
March	3	Nathan George	80	US	Actor	One Flew Over the Cuckoo's Nest; Serpico
March	5	Fred Weintraub	88	US	Producer	Enter the Dragon; Gymkata
March	6	Robert Osborne	84	US	Film Historian	
March	9	Bobby Byrne	85	US	Cinematographer	Smokey and the Bandit; Bull Durham
March	10	John Forgeham	75	UK	Actor	The Italian Job; Kiss of the Dragon
March	10	Tony Haygarth	72	UK	Actor	Dracula; Chicken Run
March	14	Jack H. Harris	98	US	Producer	The Blob; Dark Star
March	16	Rodger Maus	84	US	Production Designer	10; Victor/Victoria
March	17	Robert Day	94	UK	Director	The Green Man; The Haunted Strangler
March	17	Lawrence Montaigne	86	US	Actor	The Power; The Great Escape
March	18	Tony Russel	91	US	Actor	Secret of the Sphinx; Gladiators Seven
March	22	Tomas Milian	84	Cuba	Actor	Traffic; The Big Gundown
March	23	Lola Albright	92	US	Actress, Singer	Joy House; Kid Galahad
March	24	Jean Rouverol	100	US	Screenwriter, Actress	Face in the Rain; Stage Door
March	25	Giorgio Capitani	89	Italy	Director, Screenwriter	The Ruthless Four; The Archangel
March	28	Christine Kaufmann	72	Germany	Actress	Town Without Pity; The Last Days of Pompeii
April	4	Gordon Sterne	94	UK	Actor	An American Werewolf in London; Highlander
April	5	Memè Perlini	69	Italy	Actor, Director	The Family; Italian Postcards
April	6	Don Rickles	90	US	Actor, Comedian	Kelly's Heroes; Casino
April	7	Tim Pigott-Smith	70	UK	Actor	Clash of the Titans; V for Vendetta
April	9	Peter Hansen	95	US	Actor	When Worlds Collide; Dragonfly
April	11	Michael Ballhaus	81	Germany	Cinematographer	Goodfellas; Broadcast News
April	12	Charlie Murphy	57	US	Comedian, Actor, Screenwriter	CB4; Jungle Fever
April	15	Clifton James	96	US	Actor	Live and Let Die; Cool Hand Luke
April	18	Yvonne Monlaur	77	France	Actress	Three Strangers in Rome; Circus of Horrors
April	18	J. C. Spink	45	US	Producer	The Hangover; A History of Violence
April	21	Sandy Gallin	76	US	Producer	Father of the Bride; Buffy the Vampire Slayer
April	21	Enrico Medioli	92	Italy	Screenwriter	Once Upon a Time in America; The Leopard
April	22	Erin Moran	56	US	Actress	Watermelon Man; 80 Steps to Jonah
April	22	Gustavo Rojo	93	Uruguay	Actor	The Valley of Gwangi; Alexander the Great
April	23	Kathleen Crowley	87	US	Actress	Westward Ho the Wagons!; Female Jungle
April	24	Don Gordon	90	US	Actor	The Towering Inferno; Bullitt
April	26	Jonathan Demme	73	US	Director, Producer	The Silence of the Lambs; Philadelphia
April	27	Vinod Khanna	70	India	Actor	Achanak; Qurbani
May	1	Pierre Gaspard-Huit	99	France	Director, Screenwriter	Christine; Shéhérazade
May	3	Daliah Lavi	74	Israel	Actress, Singer	Casino Royale; Ten Little Indians
May	4	Victor Lanoux	80	France	Actor	Cousin, Cousine; The French Detective
May	8	Curt Lowens	91	Germany	Actor	Firefox; Angels & Demons
May	8	Mary Tsoni	29	Greece	Actress	Dogtooth; Evil
May	9	Michael Parks	77	US	Actor	Kill Bill; From Dusk till Dawn
May	10	Geoffrey Bayldon	93	UK	Actor	Casino Royale; To Sir, with Love
May	13	John Cygan	63	US	Voice Actor	Treasure Planet; Toy Story 3
May	13	Manuel Pradal	53	France	Director, Screenwriter	A Crime; Ginostra
May	14	Powers Boothe	68	US	Actor	Tombstone; Sin City
May	14	Brad Grey	59	US	Producer, Executive	The Departed; Scary Movie
May	16	Arvo Kukumägi	58	Estonia	Actor	Firewater; All My Lenins
May	22	Dina Merrill	93	US	Actress	Operation Petticoat; BUtterfield 8
May	23	Roger Moore	89	UK	Actor	James Bond; The Cannonball Run
May	24	Jared Martin	75	US	Actor	Westworld; The Lonely Lady
May	26	Toni Bertorelli	69	Italy	Actor	The Passion of the Christ; The Caiman
May	30	Molly Peters	75	UK	Actress	Thunderball; Target for Killing
May	31	Tino Insana	69	US	Actor	Three Amigos; Barnyard
May	31	Fred J. Koenekamp	94	US	Cinematographer	The Towering Inferno; Patton
June	1	José Greci	76	Italy	Actress	Zorro and the Three Musketeers; Operation Poker
June	2	Peter Sallis	96	UK	Actor	Wallace & Gromit: The Curse of the Were-Rabbit; The V.I.P.s
June	4	Bill Butler	83	UK	Film Editor	A Clockwork Orange; A Touch of Class
June	4	Roger Smith	84	US	Actor	No Time to Be Young; Auntie Mame
June	5	Rita Riggs	86	US	Costume Designer	The Idolmaker; Texasville
June	8	Glenne Headly	62	US	Actress	Dirty Rotten Scoundrels; Dick Tracy
June	9	Adam West	88	US	Actor	Batman; The Young Philadelphians
June	13	Anita Pallenberg	75	Italy	Actress	Dillinger Is Dead; Barbarella
June	15	Aleksey Batalov	88	Russia	Actor, Director	Moscow Does Not Believe in Tears; The Cranes Are Flying
June	16	John G. Avildsen	81	US	Director	Rocky; The Karate Kid
June	16	Stephen Furst	62	US	Actor	Animal House; The Dream Team
June	22	Keith Loneker	46	US	Actor	Out of Sight; Superbad
June	24	Loren Janes	85	US	Stuntman	Back to the Future; Hook
June	25	Skip Homeier	86	US	Actor	The Gunfighter; The Burning Hills
June	27	Michael Nyqvist	56	Sweden	Actor	The Girl with the Dragon Tattoo; John Wick
June	28	C. O. Erickson	93	US	Producer, Production Manager	Urban Cowboy; Groundhog Day
July	3	Paolo Villaggio	84	Italy	Actor, Screenwriter	Fantozzi; The Voice of the Moon
July	4	David Yewdall	66	US	Sound Engineer	The Thing; Escape from New York
July	6	Thomas E. Sanders	63	US	Production Designer, Art Director	Saving Private Ryan; Braveheart
July	8	Nelsan Ellis	39	US	Actor	Get on Up; The Help
July	8	Elsa Martinelli	82	Italy	Actress	Donatella; The Indian Fighter
July	9	Danny Daniels	92	US	Choreographer, Dancer	Pennies from Heaven; Indiana Jones and the Temple of Doom
July	13	John Bernecker	33	US	Stuntman	Logan; The Hunger Games
July	15	William Hoyland	73	UK	Actor	Hellboy; For Your Eyes Only
July	15	Martin Landau	89	US	Actor	Ed Wood; Crimes and Misdemeanors
July	16	George A. Romero	77	US	Director, Screenwriter, Film Editor	Night of the Living Dead; Dawn of the Dead
July	17	Harvey Atkin	74	Canada	Actor	Meatballs; Heavy Metal
July	17	Evan Helmuth	40	US	Actor	The Devil Inside; Fever Pitch
July	18	Red West	81	US	Actor, Stuntman	Walking Tall; Road House
July	20	Chester Bennington	41	US	Singer, Actor	Saw 3D; Crank
July	20	Claude Rich	88	France	Actor	Is Paris Burning?; Revenge of the Musketeers
July	21	John Heard	72	US	Actor	Home Alone; Big
July	26	June Foray	99	US	Voice Actress	Who Framed Roger Rabbit; The Adventures of Rocky and Bullwinkle
July	27	Sam Shepard	73	US	Actor, Screenwriter	The Right Stuff; Black Hawk Down
July	31	Jeanne Moreau	89	France	Actress	Jules and Jim; Elevator to the Gallows
July	31	Henry Richardson	81	UK	Film Editor	Runaway Train; The Thirteenth Floor
August	1	Eric Zumbrunnen	52	US	Film Editor	Being John Malkovich; Her
August	2	Daniel Licht	60	US	Composer	Thinner; Soul Survivors
August	3	Ty Hardin	87	US	Actor	Battle of the Bulge; PT 109
August	3	Robert Hardy	91	UK	Actor	Harry Potter; Sense and Sensibility
August	4	Bruno Canfora	92	Italy	Composer	Rita the Mosquito; Free Hand for a Tough Cop
August	7	Haruo Nakajima	88	Japan	Actor	Godzilla; Seven Samurai
August	8	Glen Campbell	81	US	Singer, Actor	True Grit; Norwood
August	10	Patrick O'Connell	83	Ireland	Actor	Cromwell; The McKenzie Break
August	11	Terele Pávez	78	Spain	Actress	La Celestina; Witching & Bitching
August	13	Joseph Bologna	82	US	Actor, Screenwriter	My Favorite Year; Transylvania 6-5000
August	17	Sonny Landham	76	US	Actor	Predator; 48 Hrs.
August	18	Bruce Forsyth	89	UK	Actor	Star!; Bedknobs and Broomsticks
August	20	Jerry Lewis	91	US	Actor, Director, Screenwriter	The Nutty Professor; The King of Comedy
August	21	Abdur Razzak	75	Bangladesh	Actor, Producer, Director	Behula; Agun Niye Khela
August	21	Thomas Meehan	88	US	Screenwriter	Spaceballs; To Be or Not to Be
August	23	Viola Harris	91	US	Actress	Deconstructing Harry; The Other Guys
August	24	Jay Thomas	69	US	Actor	Mr. Holland's Opus; The Santa Clause 2
August	26	Tobe Hooper	74	US	Director, Screenwriter	The Texas Chain Saw Massacre; Poltergeist
August	28	Mireille Darc	79	France	Actress	Weekend; Male Hunt
August	30	Alan MacDonald	61	UK	Production Designer	The Queen; The Best Exotic Marigold Hotel
August	31	Richard Anderson	91	US	Actor	Tora! Tora! Tora!; Paths of Glory
August	31	Novella Nelson	77	US	Actress	The Cotton Club; A Perfect Murder
September	1	Shelley Berman	92	US	Comedian, Actor	Meet the Fockers; The Holiday
September	2	Harry Gittes	81	US	Producer	Goin' South; About Schmidt
September	2	Murray Lerner	90	US	Documentarian	Festival; From Mao to Mozart
September	4	Gastone Moschin	88	Italy	Actor	The Godfather Part II; The Conformist
September	5	Yoshio Tsuchiya	90	Japan	Actor	Seven Samurai; The Mysterians
September	8	Blake Heron	35	US	Actor	Shiloh; We Were Soldiers
September	10	Hans Alfredson	86	Sweden	Actor, Director	The New Land; The Emigrants
September	10	Luigi Maria Burruano	68	Italy	Actor	One Hundred Steps; Baarìa
September	11	Peter Hall	86	UK	Director	Work Is a Four-Letter Word; The Homecoming
September	13	Frank Vincent	80	US	Actor	Goodfellas; Casino
September	15	Harry Dean Stanton	91	US	Actor	Alien; Escape from New York
September	15	Albert Moses	79	Sri Lanka	Actor	The Man Who Would Be King; East Is East
September	18	Chuck Low	89	US	Actor	Goodfellas; The Mission
September	19	Bernie Casey	78	US	Actor	Never Say Never Again; Revenge of the Nerds
September	25	Tony Booth	85	UK	Actor	Brannigan; The Girl with the Pistol
September	25	Jan Tříska	80	Czech Republic	Actor	2010: The Year We Make Contact; Ronin
September	26	Barry Dennen	79	US	Actor	Jesus Christ Superstar; The Shining
September	27	Anne Jeffreys	94	US	Actress	Dillinger; Riffraff
September	28	Benjamin Whitrow	80	UK	Actor	Darkest Hour; Chicken Run
October	5	Anne Wiazemsky	70	France	Actress	Au hasard Balthazar; La Chinoise
October	6	Terry Downes	81	UK	Actor	The Fearless Vampire Killers; A Study in Terror
October	8	Gianni Bonagura	91	Italy	Actor	In the Name of the Sovereign People; My Darling Slave
October	9	Jean Rochefort	87	France	Actor	Pardon Mon Affaire; Ridicule
October	11	Don Pedro Colley	79	US	Actor	Sugar Hill; THX 1138
October	16	Roy Dotrice	94	UK	Actor	Amadeus; Hellboy II: The Golden Army
October	16	John Dunsworth	71	Canada	Actor	The Shipping News; Take This Waltz
October	17	Danielle Darrieux	100	France	Actress, Singer	The Earrings of Madame de...; 8 Women
October	17	Harry Stradling Jr.	92	US	Cinematographer	The Way We Were; Little Big Man
October	18	Brent Briscoe	56	US	Actor	Sling Blade; A Simple Plan
October	19	Umberto Lenzi	86	Italy	Director, Screenwriter	Eaten Alive!; Sandokan the Great
October	20	Ugo Fangareggi	79	Italy	Actor	L'armata Brancaleone; And the Ship Sails On
October	20	Federico Luppi	81	Argentina	Actor	Pan's Labyrinth; The Devil's Backbone
October	21	Robert Getchell	80	US	Screenwriter	Alice Doesn't Live Here Anymore; Bound for Glory
October	23	Walter Lassally	90	Germany	Cinematographer	Zorba the Greek; The Bostonians
October	24	Willie Chan	76	Hong Kong	Producer	Shanghai Noon; New Police Story
October	24	Robert Guillaume	89	US	Actor	The Lion King; Big Fish
October	25	Jack Bannon	77	US	Actor	Little Big Man; Death Warrant
October	25	Peter MacGregor-Scott	69	US	Producer	The Fugitive; Batman Forever
October	25	John Mollo	86	UK	Costume Designer	Star Wars; Gandhi
October	30	Kim Joo-hyuk	45	South Korea	Actor	My Wife Got Married; The Servant
November	3	William Frye	96	US	Producer	The Trouble with Angels; Airport 1975
November	6	Karin Dor	79	Germany	Actress	You Only Live Twice; Topaz
November	7	Paul Buckmaster	71	UK	Composer	Midnight Crossing; 12 Monkeys
November	7	Debra Chasnoff	60	US	Documentarian	Deadly Deception; It's Elementary
November	7	Brad Harris	84	US	Actor, Stuntman	Hercules; The Mutations
November	8	Charles Tyner	92	US	Actor	Harold and Maude; The Longest Yard
November	9	John Hillerman	84	US	Actor	Chinatown; Blazing Saddles
November	10	Ray Lovelock	67	Italy	Actor	Fiddler on the Roof; The Cassandra Crossing
November	15	Luis Bacalov	84	Argentina	Composer	Il Postino; Django
November	15	Keith Barron	83	UK	Actor	Voyage of the Damned; The Land That Time Forgot
November	16	Ann Wedgeworth	83	US	Actress	Steel Magnolias; Handle with Care
November	19	Peter Baldwin	86	US	Actor, Director	Stalag 17; The Mattei Affair
November	19	Della Reese	86	US	Actress, Singer	Harlem Nights; Dinosaur
November	20	Peter Berling	83	Germany	Actor	Aguirre, the Wrath of God; Fitzcarraldo
November	21	Rodney Bewes	79	UK	Actor	Saint Jack; The Likely Lads
November	21	David Cassidy	67	US	Actor, Singer	Instant Karma; The Spirit of '76
November	23	Anthony Harvey	87	UK	Director, Film Editor	The Lion in Winter; They Might Be Giants
November	25	Rance Howard	89	US	Actor	Apollo 13; Ed Wood
November	25	Julio Oscar Mechoso	62	US	Actor	Planet Terror; Bad Boys
November	29	Heather North	71	US	Actress	Git!; The Barefoot Executive
November	30	Jim Nabors	87	US	Actor, Singer	Cannonball Run II; Stroker Ace
November	30	Alfie Curtis	87	UK	Actor	Star Wars; The Elephant Man
December	2	Ulli Lommel	72	Germany	Director, Actor	The Tenderness of Wolves; The Boogeyman
December	2	Shashi Kapoor	70	India	Actor	Heat and Dust; The Deceivers
December	5	Johnny Hallyday	74	France	Actor, Singer	Détective; The Man on the Train
December	6	Conrad Brooks	86	US	Actor	Plan 9 from Outer Space; Glen or Glenda
December	7	Steve Reevis	55	US	Actor	Fargo; The Missing
December	8	Howard Gottfried	94	US	Producer	Network; Altered States
December	10	Bruce Brown	80	US	Documentarian	The Endless Summer; On Any Sunday
December	11	Suzanna Leigh	72	UK	Actress	Paradise, Hawaiian Style; Son of Dracula
December	13	Bruce Gray	81	Canada	Actor	My Big Fat Greek Wedding; Crimson Peak
December	13	Martin Ransohoff	90	US	Producer	Catch-22; Jagged Edge
December	15	Darlanne Fluegel	64	US	Actress	Once Upon a Time in America; Running Scared
December	19	Thérèse DePrez	52	US	Production Designer	Black Swan; High Fidelity
December	19	Hiep Thi Le	46	Vietnam	Actress	Heaven & Earth; Green Dragon
December	21	Dominic Frontiere	86	US	Composer	The Stunt Man; Hang 'Em High
December	22	Gerald B. Greenberg	81	US	Film Editor	The French Connection; Apocalypse Now
December	23	Thomas Stanford	93	US	Film Editor	West Side Story; Jeremiah Johnson
December	24	Heather Menzies	68	Canada	Actress	The Sound of Music; Piranha
December	27	Thomas Hunter	85	US	Actor, Screenwriter	The Hills Run Red; The Final Countdown
December	28	Rose Marie	94	US	Actress	The Big Beat; Cheaper to Keep Her
December	29	Peggy Cummins	92	UK	Actress	Gun Crazy; Night of the Demon

== Film debuts ==
- Yahya Abdul-Mateen II – The Vanishing of Sidney Hall
- Noée Abita – Ava
- Chanté Adams – Roxanne Roxanne
- Lorena Andrea – Papillon
- KJ Apa – A Dog's Purpose
- Madison Bailey – Fist Fight
- Maria Bakalova – XIIa
- Abhinay Berde – Ti Saddhya Kay Karte
- Miguel Bernardeau – It's for Your Own Good
- Vivien Lyra Blair – Band Aid
- Georgina Campbell – King Arthur: Legend of the Sword
- Hanna Chan – Paradox
- Jodie Comer – England is Mine
- Harris Dickinson – Beach Rats
- Tom Glynn-Carney – Dunkirk
- Suyog Gorhe – Bus Stop
- Ariana Greenblatt – A Bad Moms Christmas
- Jonah Hauer-King – The Last Photograph
- Billy Howle – The Sense of an Ending
- Chosen Jacobs – It
- Ansu Kabia – Murder on the Orient Express
- Dafne Keen – Logan
- Gabriel LaBelle – Max 2: White House Hero
- Demi Lovato - Smurfs: The Lost Village
- Mikey Madison – Liza, Liza, Skies Are Grey
- Ling Man-lung - Tomorrow is Another Day
- Sebastian Maniscalco – The House
- Putri Marino – Posesif
- Rachel Matthews – Happy Death Day
- John McCrea – God's Own Country
- Hasan Minhaj – Rough Night
- Kate Moyer – It
- Celeste O'Connor – Wetlands
- María Pedraza – Amar: With You Until the End of the World
- Brooklynn Prince – Robo-Dog: Airborne
- Marianne Rendón – Gemini
- Will Ropp – The 'Claw
- Harry Styles - Dunkirk
- Jackson Robert Scott – It
- Demetrius Shipp Jr. – All Eyez on Me
- Ella-Rae Smith – Butterfly Kisses
- Emily Tosta – Vikes
- Fionn Whitehead – Dunkirk
- Finn Wolfhard – It
