= 37th Hong Kong Film Awards =

2018 Hong Kong Film Awards

- Poster
- Date: 15 April 2018
- Site: Hong Kong Cultural Centre
- Hosted by: Charlene Choi and Louis Cheung
- Organised by: Hong Kong Film Awards Association

Highlights
- Best Film: Our Time Will Come
- Best Director: Ann Hui; Our Time Will Come
- Best Actor: Louis Koo; Paradox
- Best Actress: Teresa Mo; Tomorrow Is Another Day
- Most awards: Our Time Will Come (5)
- Most nominations: Our Time Will Come (11)

Television coverage
- Network: ViuTV

The 37th Hong Kong Film Awards presentation ceremony took place at the Hong Kong Cultural Centre on 15 April 2018.

== Winners and nominees ==
Winners are listed first, highlighted in boldface, and indicated with a double dagger ‡.

**Best Film**: **Roger Lee, Stephen Lam, Ann Hui — Our Time Will Come** ‡; Alvin Lam, Andy Lau, Chan Pui-wah, Esther Koo, Alice Chan, Jeffrey Chan, Simon Li, Thomas Tang, Chang Bin, C.K. Wong, Xingbo Guan — Shock Wave; Patricia Cheng — Love Education; Wong Jing, Donnie Yen, Andy Lau, Connie Wong — Chasing the Dragon; Soi Cheang, Paco Wong — Paradox	**Best Director**: **Ann Hui — Our Time Will Come** ‡; Kearen Pang — 29+1; Herman Yau — Shock Wave; Sylvia Chang — Love Education; Wilson Yip — Paradox
**Best Screenplay**: **Sylvia Chang, You Xiaoying — Love Education** ‡; Kearen Pang — 29+1; Ho Kei-ping — Our Time Will Come; Pang Ho-cheung, Jimmy Wan, Luk Yee-sum — Love Off the Cuff; King Cheung — Somewhere Beyond the Mist	**Best Actor**: **Louis Koo — Paradox** ‡; Ronald Cheng — Concerto of the Bully; Andy Lau — Shock Wave; Tian Zhuangzhuang — Love Education; Ling Man-lung — Tomorrow Is Another Day
**Best Actress**: **Teresa Mo — Tomorrow Is Another Day** ‡; Chrissie Chau — 29+1; Zhou Xun — Our Time Will Come; Stephy Tang — The Empty Hands; Sylvia Chang — Love Education	**Best Supporting Actor**: **Philip Keung — Shock Wave** ‡; Philip Keung — Concerto of the Bully; Yasuaki Kurata — The Empty Hands; Paul Chun — Love Off the Cuff; Gordon Lam — Paradox; Yasuaki Kurata — God of War
**Best Supporting Actress**: **Deanie Ip — Our Time Will Come** ‡; Joyce Cheng — 29+1; Estelle Wu — Love Education; Siu Yam-yam — Vampire Cleanup Department; Baby Bo — Somewhere Beyond the Mist	**Best New Performer**: **Ling Man-lung — Tomorrow Is Another Day** ‡; Larine Tang — The Yuppie Fantasia 3; Stephanie Au — Love Off the Cuff; Hanna Chan — Paradox; Rachel Leung — Somewhere Beyond the Mist
**Best Cinematography**: **Jason Kwan — Chasing the Dragon** ‡; Nelson Yu — Our Time Will Come; Tam Wai-kai — The Empty Hands; Mark Lee Ping-bing — Love Education; Kenny Tse — Paradox	**Best Film Editing**: **Li Ka-wing — Chasing the Dragon** ‡; William Chang, Shirley Yip — In Your Dreams; Azreal Chung — Shock Wave; Mary Stephen, Kong Chi-leung — Our Time Will Come; Wong Hoi — Paradox
**Best Art Direction**: **Man Lim-chung, Billy Li — Our Time Will Come** ‡; Yoshihito Akatsuka, Liao Huei-li, Guo Zhongshan — Journey to the West: The Demons Strike Back; Irving Cheung — The Empty Hands; Eric Lam — Wu Kong; James Cheung — Chasing the Dragon	**Best Costume & Make Up Design**: **Bruce Yu, Lee Pik-kwan — Journey to the West: The Demons Strike Back** ‡; Man Lim-chung, Polly Chan — Our Time Will Come; Bruce Yu, Lee Pik-kwan — Wu Kong; Yee Chung-man, Bruce Yu, Kwok Suk-man — Chasing the Dragon; Dora Ng — This Is Not What I Expected
**Best Action Choreography**: **Sammo Hung — Paradox** ‡; Li Chung-chi — The Brink; Yuen Cheung-yan, Yuen Shun-yi — The Thousand Faces of Dunjia; Ku Huen-chiu — Wu Kong; Yu Kang, Yuen Bun, Yan Hua — Chasing the Dragon	**Best Original Film Score**: **Joe Hisaishi — Our Time Will Come** ‡; Wong Ngai-lun, Janet Yung — 29+1; Peter Kam — Concerto of the Bully; Veronica Lee — The Empty Hands; Kay Huang — Love Education
**Best Original Film Song**: **"An Unheard Melody" — Concerto of the Bully** ‡; **Composer: Peter Kam**; **Lyrics: Keith Chan Siu-kei**; **Performer: Ronald Cheng**; "Fake a Smile (For Hector)" — 29+1; Composer: Subyub Lee; Lyrics: Subyub Lee; Performer: Subyub Lee; "Flowers in Blossom" — Love Education; Composer: Kay Huang; Lyrics: Lam Kwun-fan; Performer: Sitar Tan; "Jeung Seung Si Sau" — Vampire Cleanup Department; Composer: ToNick; Lyrics: Leung Pak-kin, Gingerlemon Cola; Performer: ToNick; "When I Love You" — This Is Not What I Expected; Composer: Chan Kwong-wing; Lyrics: Han Han; Performer: Cheer Chen	**Best Sound Design**: **Kinson Tsang, George Lee — Paradox** ‡; Tu Du-chih, Wu Shu-yao — Our Time Will Come; Kinson Tsang, Yiu Chun-hin — Journey to the West: The Demons Strike Back; Nip Kei-wing, Ip Siu-kei — Shock Wave; Hao Gang, Wang Chong — Wu Kong
**Best Visual Effects**: **Henri Wong, Eric Xu — Wu Kong** ‡; Park Young-soo, Kim Wook — Journey to the West: The Demons Strike Back; Jang Seong-ho, Park Young-soo, Son Oh-young — The Thousand Faces of Dunjia; Yee Kwok-leung, Chui Tak-piu, Jules Lin, Loki Ho — Shock Wave; Victor Wong, Eman Tse — The Founding of an Army	**Best New Director**: **Kearen Pang — 29+1** ‡; Jonathan Li — The Brink; Chapman To — The Empty Hands; Derek Hui — This Is Not What I Expected; Chan Tai-lee — Tomorrow Is Another Day
**Best Film from Mainland and Taiwan**: **The Great Buddha+** (Taiwan) ‡; The Bold, the Corrupt, and the Beautiful (Taiwan); Youth (China); Duckweed (China); Wolf Warrior 2 (China)	**Professional Achievement** **Pauline Yeung**
**Lifetime Achievement Award** **Chor Yuen**	**Best Dressed** **Male: Philip Keung** ‡ **Female: Stephy Tang** ‡
