= List of 2017 box office number-one films in China =

The following is a list of 2017 box office number-one films in China (only Mainland China).

#	Date	Film	Gross	Notes
1	8 January 2017	Rogue One: A Star Wars Story	US$30.08 million	
2	15 January 2017	Passengers	US$17.3 million	
3	22 January 2017	Arrival	US$7.49 million	
4	29 January 2017	Journey to the West: The Demons Strike Back	US$84.16 million	
5	5 February 2017	Kung Fu Yoga	US$49.9 million	
6	12 February 2017	xXx: Return of Xander Cage	US$60.41 million	
7	19 February 2017	xXx: Return of Xander Cage	US$26.45 million	
8	26 February 2017	Resident Evil: The Final Chapter	US$94.33 million	
9	5 March 2017	Logan	US$48.83 million	
10	12 March 2017	A Dog's Purpose	US$21.52 million	
11	19 March 2017	Beauty and the Beast	US$44.53 million	
12	26 March 2017	Kong: Skull Island	US$71.64 million	
13	2 April 2017	Kong: Skull Island	US$23.54 million	
14	9 April 2017	Ghost in the Shell	US$21.42 million	
15	16 April 2017	The Fate of the Furious	US$184.90 million	
16	23 April 2017	The Fate of the Furious	US$54.9 million	
17	30 April 2017	Shock Wave	US$24.6 million	
18	7 May 2017	Guardians of the Galaxy Vol. 2	US$48.56 million	
19	14 May 2017	Dangal	US$32.5 million	
20	21 May 2017	Dangal	US$34.47 million	
21	28 May 2017	Pirates of the Caribbean: Dead Men Tell No Tales	US$65.88 million	
22	4 June 2017	Wonder Woman	US$37.67 million	
23	11 June 2017	The Mummy	US$51.33 million	
24	18 June 2017	Alien: Covenant	US$28.22 million	
25	25 June 2017	Transformers: The Last Knight	US$125.28 million	
26	2 July 2017	Transformers: The Last Knight	US$30.7 million	
27	9 July 2017	Despicable Me 3	US$64.05 million	
28	16 July 2017	Wu Kong	US$40.72 million	
29	23 July 2017	Brotherhood of Blades 2	US$16.6 million	
30	30 July 2017	Wolf Warriors 2	US$131.77 million	
31	6 August 2017	Wolf Warriors 2	US$162.40 million	
32	13 August 2017	Wolf Warriors 2	US$83.92 million	
33	20 August 2017	Wolf Warriors 2	US$35.96 million	
34	27 August 2017	Valerian and the City of a Thousand Planets	US$28.62 million	
35	3 September 2017	Dunkirk	US$29.63 million	
36	10 September 2017	Spider-Man: Homecoming	US$69.24 million	
37	17 September 2017	War for the Planet of the Apes	US$59.79 million	
38	24 September 2017	War for the Planet of the Apes	US$18.39 million	
39	1 October 2017	Never Say Die	US$46.43 million	
40	8 October 2017	Never Say Die	US$65.56 million	
41	15 October 2017	Never Say Die	US$29.81 million	
42	22 October 2017	Kingsman: The Golden Circle	US$39.01 million	
43	29 October 2017	Geostorm	US$33.49 million	
44	5 November 2017	Thor: Ragnarok	US$53.32 million	
45	12 November 2017	Thor: Ragnarok	US$21.64 million	
46	19 November 2017	Justice League	US$103.4 million	
47	26 November 2017	Coco	US$17.88 million	
48	3 December 2017	Coco	US$44.14 million	
49	10 December 2017	Coco	US$34.74 million	
50	17 December 2017	Youth	US$44.31 million	
51	24 December 2017	Youth	US$38.53 million	

== See also ==
- List of Chinese films of 2017
