= Shock Wave 2 =

2020 Hong Kong-Chinese film by Herman Yau

- Theatrical release poster

Chinese name
- Traditional Chinese: 拆彈專家2
- Simplified Chinese: 拆弹专家2
- Literal meaning: Bomb Disposal Specialist 2
Transcriptions
Standard Mandarin
- Hanyu Pinyin: chāi dàn zhuānjiā 2
Yue: Cantonese
- Jyutping: caak3 daan2 zyun1 gaa1 ji6
- Directed by: Herman Yau
- Written by: Herman Yau; Erica Li; Eric Lee
- Produced by: Andy Lau; Alvin Lam; Esther Koo; Calvin Choi
- Starring: Andy Lau; Sean Lau; Ni Ni
- Cinematography: Joe Chan
- Edited by: Azrael Chung
- Music by: Mak Chun Hung
- Production companies: Universe Entertainment; Focus Films; Infinitus Entertainment; Alibaba Pictures; Yingming Culture Communication; Universe Matrix Century Films Distribution (Beijing) Company; AMTD Digital Media; Universe Films Distribution
- Distributed by: Universe Films Distribution (Hong Kong, Worldwide); Gala Film Distribution (Hong Kong)
- Release dates: 24 December 2020 (China); 18 February 2021 (Hong Kong)
- Running time: 120 minutes
- Countries: Hong Kong; China
- Language: Cantonese
- Budget: US$40 million
- Box office: US$226.4 million (Note: See Box office)

Shock Wave 2 is a 2020 Hong Kong-Chinese action film written and directed by Herman Yau, produced by and starring Andy Lau. The film is a standalone sequel to the 2017 film Shock Wave, featuring a new storyline and characters. In the film, Lau plays a former bomb disposal officer who falls into a coma in an explosion, resulting in amnesia, and becomes a top suspect of a terrorist attack. After being apprehended, he escapes from custody as a fugitive to piece together his identity and the in and outs of the incident.

The film was first announced on 15 March 2018. Production for Shock Wave 2 began in February 2019 and wrapped up on 8 May 2019. The film was originally set for theatrical release in July 2020, but was later pushed back to 24 December 2020. It has grossed $226.4 million worldwide, making it the tenth-highest-grossing film of 2020.

== Plot ==
In Hong Kong, a mysterious terrorist organization, Vendetta, run by Ma Sai-kwan (codename Maverick) and a mysterious individual known as Blizzard, bombs the region's education bureau, making it the center of the police's attention. Poon Sing-fung, Ma's friend and a former Hong Kong Police Explosive Ordnance disposal officer who lost his leg to a neglected explosive in a rescue mission five years ago, was denied of his career by his superiors in fear of damaging the police' reputation for employing the handicapped. Enraged by their blatant betrayal, he joined Vendetta. Four months later, he is spotted placing a bomb at a hotel by security. Poon is unconscious after the bomb explodes and is now a suspect. He wakes up in a hospital with no memory about what happened, and escapes during an interrogation. Pong Ling, chief inspector of the Counter Terrorism Response Unit, and Lee Yiu-sing, CID Chief Inspector, are assigned to find out who is behind the bombings and the identity of the Blizzard and their supposedly meeting with an individual known as "Davy". Vendetta operatives are sent to the hospital to retrieve Poon but are killed by Lee and his men.

Poon corners Pong Ling after the chaos. She reminds him of his past life after his leg loss, such as being a model officer in the Explosive Ordnance Disposal Bureau (EODB), his deteriorating relationship with his superiors, and his slandering of the police forces in a ceremony honoring him. Poon is also told he is the Vendetta member Blizzard. While most of this is true, Pong claims that he joined Vendetta undercover to stop them and reclaim his career. Pong tells Tung Cheuk-man, another EOD officer and Poon's best friend, that when Poon fell into a coma, she hired top neurology doctors to manipulate his allegiance via implanting false memories. Tung is upset with their methods and only plays along as Poon's friend. Pong retorts that this is the best way for the HK supreme court to show Poon mercy after his involvement in the bombings.

Upon receiving a message containing inspiration magazine from Al-Qaeda, Poon meets with Vendetta's leader Ma Sai-kwan and four other members of the group, codenamed Money, Slave, Sniper and Rhino who are all planning yet another attack. Vendetta sends Sniper to place a bomb in the middle of the city, which would destroy a large area by rupturing gas pipelines below it. Tung, Inspector Lee, Pong Ling, and Poon's former co-workers in the EODB, Lun Ting-pong and Chan King-to, are dispatched to the scene. Sniper severely wounds Chan and Tung (who survives in part to his suit's armor). Unable to properly shoot Sniper at range, Pong's squad is forced to find their way around and eventually shoot him dead. Chan dies from blood-loss, despite efforts to save him.

Poon is then spotted talking to Pong by Vendetta, and he later wishes to withdraw. Feeling betrayed, Ma traps Poon based on a board game (Mastermind) in order to force Poon to remember who he is before leaving. Pong and Tung arrive with a squad to save Poon, though they fail initially until Poon recalls Ma's Mastermind combination, allowing Tung to free him at the last moment. Poon tells them Vendetta is planning to bomb the IFC building and the Hong Kong airport, while "Davy" is a tiny nuclear warhead. If detonated, it is of 10 to 20 tons of TNT equivalent and will leave the area irradiated for centuries to come. They then rush to intercept the Vendetta terrorists.

Ma and his men simultaneously raid the IFC and Hong Kong MTR as well as the Airport Express train. He hijacks a train and has his men plant bombs and the Davy Crockett bomb and leaves with the train but not before his men take hostages to slow the police down. Lun and his co-worker Fat Sze managed to defuse the rigged van in IFC parking garage while also killing Money and Slave. Inspector Lee arrives with his team and kills the Vendetta members to secure the area. Lun manages to intercept the other train carrying the other bomb and arranges to ram the bomb train into the water. The plan involves destroying both connections of the Tsing Ma Bridge to sink the explosives, thereby minimizing any collateral damage. Pong and her CTRU teams successfully raid the control station, killing Rhino's men, and he commits suicide.

Poon and Tung arrange for the rigged van to be near a strategic location before arming the bomb. Tung escapes into the helicopter, but Poon insists staying behind as atonement for his involvement in the previous Vendetta terrorist attacks. Tearfully saying goodbye to Pong, Poon sacrifices himself to destroy the bridge. With Lun's help, Ma's train is intercepted by the severed bridge and sinks before exploding moments later, killing him and Poon while sending a shockwave underwater, saving HK from a potential fallout. Tung and Lun mourn Poon's death, while Pong is left in tears wondering if Poon's sacrifice was worth all their efforts.

In the closing scenes, Pong requests one of the neurology doctors to erase all her memories associated with Poon, save for one particular moment. She then flashes back to encountering Poon at a police dinner, where he deliberately spills some red wine on her uniform to catch her eye.

== Cast ==
- Andy Lau as Poon Sing-fung (潘乘風), a former Bomb Disposal Officer of the Explosive Ordinance Disposal Bureau (EODB) who resigned after Hong Kong Police Force denied his original frontline position in fear of his injury. Enraged by their betrayal, he joins "Vendetta", where he is codenamed "Blizzard" (暴雪). Five years later, he becomes a top suspect of a terrorist attack after falling unconscious from an explosion, which resulted in him having amnesia.
- Sean Lau as Tung Cheuk-man (董卓文), a Bomb Disposal Officer of the EODB, as well as a partner and friend of Poon. He remains supportive of Poon at all times despite the latter's change of behaviour.
- Ni Ni as Pong Ling (龐玲), Poon's ex-girlfriend and chief inspector of the Counter Terrorism Response Unit (CTRU) who devises a plan to brainwash Poon into believing he was an undercover cop in order for him to receive a lighter sentence.
- Tse Kwan-ho as Ma Sai-kwan (馬世軍), codenamed "Maverick" (獨行者), Poon's former schoolmate and the anarchist leader of Vendetta (復生會) terrorist organization.
- Philip Keung as Lee Yiu-sing (李耀昇), chief inspector of the Criminal Investigation Department (CID) who has a hot-tempered and impetuous personality.
- Ron Ng as Lun Ting-pong (倫定邦), an Assistant Bomb Disposal Officer to Tung.
- Kenny Wong as Chan King-to (陳景圖), an Assistant Bomb Disposal Officer of EODB.
- Timothy Cheng as Chan Wai-keung (陳偉強), Director of the Operations Department.
- Timmy Hung as King, senior inspector of CTRU who is Pong's subordinate.
- Ben Yuen as Chin Ka-on (錢家安), a member of Vendetta whose codename is "Money" (金錢)
- Wilfred Lau as Sze-to Wai (司徒偉), a member of Vendetta whose codename is "Slave" (奴隸).
- Ling Man-lung as Siu-hak (小克), a member of Vendetta whose codename is "Sniper" (狙擊手) and was even trained by Blizzard personally.
- Marc Ma as Rhino (犀牛), a member of Vendetta whose real name is unknown.
- Babyjohn Choi as Cheung Chi-man (張志文), a doctorate graduate, revealed to be a member of Vendetta, whose codename is "Doctor" (博士).
- Raymond Chiu as Fat Sze (肥司), an Assistant Bomb Disposal Officer of EOD.
- Jerome Cheung as Stephen, a CID inspector who is Lee's subordinate.
- Zhang Yang as Mon, an Assistant Bomb Disposal Officer of EODB.
- Olivia Yan as Wong Ching-yee (王靜儀), a psychology professor who implants false memories into Poon for him to believe himself to be an undercover cop.

== Theme song ==
- Believe Me (相信我)
  - Singer: Andy Lau, Ni Ni
  - Composer/Arranger: Jacky Cai
  - Lyricist: Andy Lau
  - Producer: Jacky Chan

== Production ==
=== Development ===
A sequel to Shock Wave was first announced by producer and star Andy Lau during a celebration event for the film on 4 May 2017. On 16 March 2018, Universe Entertainment confirmed this and released a teaser film poster. Lau returned as producer and star while Herman Yau as director. Daneil Lam also announced that production would commence in 2019, and that it would be a standalone sequel with new characters and a new story line. A week later, the film was promoted at the 2018 Hong Kong International Film & TV Market (Filmart), which ran from 19 to 22 March 2018.

=== Filming ===
On 8 March 2019 while attending as a presenter for the 25th Hong Kong Film Critics Society Award ceremony, Andy Lau revealed that he had begun working on the filming of Shock Wave 2, and appearing in a new hairstyle look for his role in the film. On 11 March, reporters spotted the crew filming a scene around Fa Yuen Street and Golden Fish Street in Mongkok, where director Herman Yau and cast members Ni Ni and Timmy Hung were present. The film held its production commencement blessing ceremony in Kam Tin, Yuen Long on 28 March. The ceremony was attended by director Herman Yau along with cast members Lau, Sean Lau, Ni, Philip Keung, Tse Kwan-ho, Ron Ng, Hung, Kenny Wong, Jerome Cheung and Zhang Yang.

On 30 March, filming of a car explosion scene took place in Temple Street where cast members Andy Lau, Sean Lau, Keung, Ng and Wong were present. Real firefighters and paramedics were employed for the filming of this scene instead of using extra actors On 27 April, filming of a major explosion scene involving Lau dropping a grenade into a sandbag defence place in East Tsim Sha Tsui. A number of police cars, ambulances and an EOD vehicle were used in the scene along with over 50 extra actors. Production for Shock Wave 2 officially wrapped up on 8 May 2019, where a wrap up ceremony was held on the same day at the Marco Polo Hongkong Hotel in Tsim Sha Tsui attended by the cast and crew.

== Release ==
Shock Wave 2 was originally set for release in July 2020, but due to the COVID-19 pandemic, it was pushed back to 24 December 2020. However, due to cinema closures from 2 December 2020 to 17 February 2021 amid the fourth wave of the COVID-19 pandemic in Hong Kong, the film's release in Hong Kong was postponed again until cinemas reopened on 18 February 2021. The film retained its 24 December 2020 release date for China, where it played in IMAX theatres, Singapore and Western countries such as North America, Australia and New Zealand.

The film was shown at the 23rd Far East Film Festival from 24 to 26 June 2021, and will also be shown in competition at the 20th Neuchâtel International Fantastic Film Festival as part of "New Cinema From Asia" on 3 July 2021.

== Reception ==
=== Box office ===
As of 28 Match 2021, Shock Wave 2 has grossed US$226.4 million worldwide, combining its box office gross from Hong Kong (US$2.5 million), China (US$219 million), Taiwan (US$3.28 million), Singapore (US$1.12 million), Australia (US$308,538), New Zealand (US$82,444), United Arab Emirates (US$80,965), South Korea (US$11,462) and Russia (US$6,403). The film debuted No.1 at the global box office, grossing US$63.9 million on its opening weekend worldwide.

==== Hong Kong ====
The film debuted at No.1 on its opening day in Hong Kong with a gross of HK$1,137,578. By the end of its opening weekend, the film grossed HK$6,414,402 (US$827,334), coming in at No.1, after consecutively topping the daily box office during its four days of release despite theaters operating with reduced capacity due to Covid-19 safety guidelines. The film remained at No.1 during its second weekend where it grossed HK$6,608,241 and have accumulated a total gross of HK$13,022,643 (US$1,678,911) by then. During its third weekend, the film grossed HK$3,513,430, coming in at No. 2, and have accumulated a total gross of HK$16,539,304 (US$2,130,475) by then. On its fourth weekend, the film grossed HK$1,599,517, coming in at No. 4, and have grossed a total of HK$18,138,821 (US$2,336,604) by then. During its fifth weekend, the film grossed HK$748,226, coming in at No. 5, and have accumulated a total gross of HK$18,887,167 (US$2.43 million) by then. On its sixth weekend, the film grossed HK$243,554, coming in at No. 9, and have grossed a total of HK$19,130,721 (US$2.5 million) by then.

Shock Wave 2 grossed a total of HK$19,387,097 at the Hong Kong box office and became the fourth-highest grossing film overall of 2020 in the territory.

==== China ====
In China, the film grossed US$63.2 million after consecutively topping the daily box office during its four days of release, including US$4.4 million from IMAX screens, debuting at No. 1 on its opening weekend. During its second weekend, the film grossed US$67.1 million, coming in at No. 3, accumulating a total gross of US$137.1 million by then. On its third weekend, the film grossed US$24 million and remained at No. 3, having grossed a total of US$161.2 million by then. During its fourth weekend, the film grossed US$15.7 million, moving up to No. 2 and have grossed a total of US$176.9 million by then. On its fifth weekend, the film grossed US$12.9 million, remaining at No. 2, and have grossed a total of US$189.9 million by then. On its sixth weekend, the film grossed US$12.1 million, remaining at No. 2 for three consecutive weeks, and have grossed a total of US$202 million by then. On its seventh weekend, the film remained at No. 2 for four consecutive weeks with a gross of US$10.6 million and have accumulated a total gross of US$212.6 million by then. During its eighth weekend, the film grossed US$5.5 million, coming in at No. 8, and have grossed a total of US$218.1 million so far. The film did not make it to the top 10 box office during its ninth weekend, but it secured a position in its tenth weekend, grossing US$0.9 million and coming in at No. 10, with the box office totaling US$219 million.

Shock Wave 2 grossed CN¥1,314,789,000 at the Chinese box office and became the highest-grossing Hong Kong film in China, overtaking previous record holder, which was Lau and Yau's previous collaboration, The White Storm 2: Drug Lords in 2019.

==== Taiwan ====
Opening on 31 December 2020 in Taiwan, the film grossed NT$27.88 million (US$970,000) during its first four days of release, debuting at No. 3 on its opening weekend and is the highest-grossing new release during the New Year's Day holiday period. During its second weekend, the film grossed NT$23.07 million, moving up to No. 2, and have accumulated a total gross of NT$50.95 million (US$1.79 million) by then. On its third weekend, the film grossed NT$16.51 million, coming in at No. 3 and have grossed a total of NT$67.1 million (US$2.35 million) by then. During its fourth weekend, the film grossed NT$10.56 million, coming in at No. 4, and have grossed a total of NT$77.66 million (US$2.73 million) by then. On its fifth weekend, the film grossed NT$5.88 million, ranking at No. 7, and have accumulated a total gross of NT$83.54 million (US$2.94 million) by then. During its sixth weekend, the film grossed NT$2.92 million, coming in at No. 11, and have grossed a total of NT$86.46 million (US$3.04 million) by then. On its seventh weekend, the film grossed NT$3.68 million, coming in at No. 15, and have accumulated a total gross of NT$89.09 million (US$3.13 million) by the then. In the eighth weekend, the film grossed NT$1.73 million, coming in at No. 18, accumulating a total gross of NT$90.82 million (US$3.26 million) so far. In the ninth week, the box office revenue was NT$430,000, and the cumulative box office so far is NT$91.25 million (US$3.28 million).

=== Critical response ===
On Rotten Tomatoes, Shock Wave 2 has an approval rating of 82% based on 11 reviews, with an average rating of 6.9/10.

Jeanmarie Tan of The New Paper gave the film a score of 4/5 and praises Andy Lau's physical prowess and multi-layer performance. Edmund Lee of the South China Morning Post gave the film a score of 3.5/5 stars and compliments its abundance of action sequences which makes it "easy to look beyond the overwrought story". Tay Yek-keak of Today gave the film a similar score of 3.5/5, praising it as larger, more fast-paced and entertaining than its predecessor. Lim Yian-lu of Yahoo! Singapore gave the film a score of 3/5 stars, describing it as less thrilling than its predecessor. Anna Smith of Deadline Hollywood gives praises to the film's action set pieces and visual effects. Sean Gilman of Medium praises director Herman Yau as "nothing if not sophisticated in both his critique of the state and the limits of his own abilities to express that critique through popular cinema." Leslie Felperin of The Guardian gave the film a score of 2/5 stars and describes the film as "all a bit otiose and a little stale."

== Awards and nominations ==
Ceremony	Category	Recipient	Results
40th Hong Kong Film Awards	Best Action Choreography	Lee Chung-chi	Nominated
40th Hong Kong Film Awards	Best Film Editing	Azrael Chung	Nominated
40th Hong Kong Film Awards	Best Sound Design	Nip Kei-wing, Ip Siu-kei	Nominated
40th Hong Kong Film Awards	Best Visual Effects	Yee Kwok-leung, Garrett K Lam, Chiu Tak-piu, Loki Ho	Nominated
28th Hong Kong Film Critics Society Awards	Best Director	Herman Yau	Nominated
28th Hong Kong Film Critics Society Awards	Best Screenplay	Herman Yau, Erica Li, Eric Lee	Nominated
28th Hong Kong Film Critics Society Awards	Film of Merit	Shock Wave 2	Won
30th Huading Awards	Best Film	Shock Wave 2	Nominated
30th Huading Awards	Best Director	Herman Yau	Nominated
30th Huading Awards	Best Actor	Andy Lau	Won
30th Huading Awards	Best Screenplay	Herman Yau, Erica Li, Eric Lee	Nominated
30th Huading Awards	Best Hong Kong Film	Shock Wave 2	Nominated
30th Huading Awards	Best Professionalism Award	Andy Lau	Won

== Sequel ==
On 18 June 2021, Andy Lau announced several upcoming film projects that he will be starring in during a live broadcast celebration of the 33rd anniversary of his fan club, Andy World Club, with a sequel to the film titled Shock Wave 3 being one of the slated films and is set to begin production in 2022.

== See also ==
- Andy Lau filmography
