= Hanna Chan =

Hong Kong model and actress

- 陳漢娜（原名：陳恩淇）
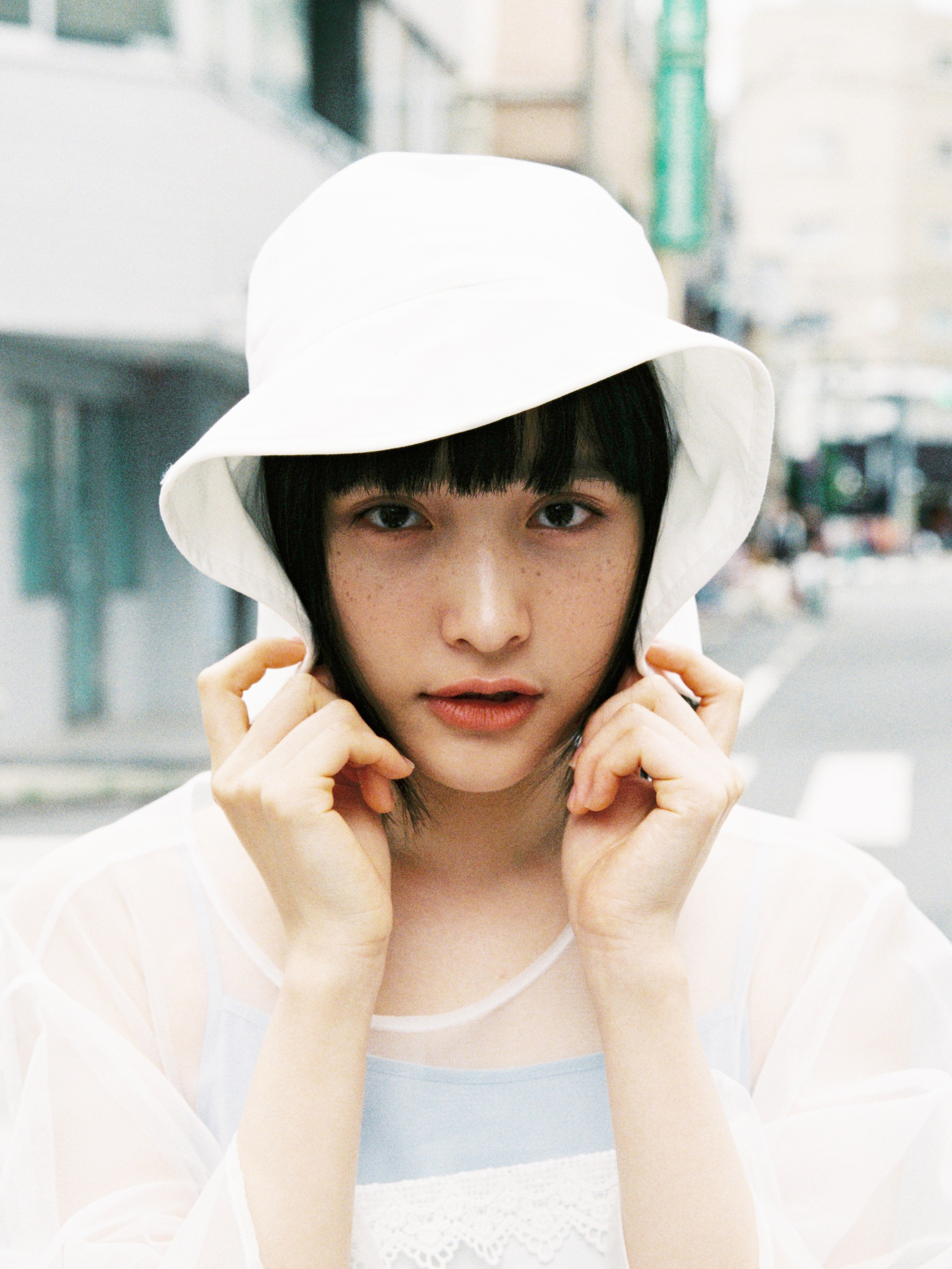
- Born: 24 September 1993 (age 33); British Hong Kong
- Education: Hong Kong Polytechnic University
- Occupations: Actress; model
- Years active: 2015–present

Hanna Chan Hon-na (Chinese: 陳漢娜; born 24 September 1993), is a Hong Kong fashion model and actress. She earned a nomination for the Best New Performer in Paradox at 37th Hong Kong Film Awards in 2018.

== Filmography ==
=== Movie ===
Year	Film	Role	Notes
2017	Paradox	Lee Wing-chi	
2018	G Affairs	Chiu Yu-Ting	Main Role
2020	The Fallen	Snow Fuyu	Supporting Role
2021	Elisa's Day	Elisa	Main Role
2021	Limbo	Will's wife	Supporting Role
2021	Breakout Brothers	Wing Ki	Cameo
2022	Far Far Away	Lisa	Supporting role
2023	Over My Dead Body	Sue Yu	
2023	Time Still Turns the Pages	Sherry Lam	

=== Drama ===
Year	Title	Chinese title	Role	Network	Notes
2016	Kai Pop	–	Hanna	ViuTV	
2018	Afterlife Firm	身後事務所	Yan	ViuTV	EP.9–10,18–21,24–30
2022	In Geek We Trust	IT狗	Mung Ling	ViuTV	Main Role
2023	Business Proposal (HK)	社內相親	Hollie Suen Ho-lee	ViuTV	Main Role

=== Television ===
Year	Title	Chinese title	Network	Notes
2021	The Investigations of Hong Kong Secrets	香港秘密搜查官	ViuTV	Host

=== Music videos ===
Year	Title	Notes
2020	Tang Siu Hau – "Walk With Me"	
2020	Jay Fung – "Beyond the Stars"	
2020	Gin Lee – "幸福門"	
2020	Eason Chan – "是但求其愛"	
2020	JC – "LOXIT"	
2021	Anson Lo – "不可愛教主"	
2021	Dear Jane – "Grounded"	
2022	Anson Lo – "39 Wing Shun Street"	
2022	Jeffrey Ngai – "第一個迷"	

== Awards and nominations ==
Award	Year	Nominee / Work	Category	Result	Ref.
Hong Kong Film Award	2018	Paradox	Best New Performer	Nominated	
