= 29+1 =

2017 Hong Kong film by Kearen Pang

- Theatrical release poster
- Directed by: Kearen Pang
- Screenplay by: Kearen Pang
- Based on: 29+1 by Kearen Pang
- Produced by: Allen Chan; Albert Lee; Cora Yim
- Starring: Chrissie Chau; Joyce Cheng
- Cinematography: Jason Kwan
- Edited by: Lee Him-ming; Kearen Pang
- Music by: Wong Ngai-lun; Janet Yung
- Production company: Asian Rich Ltd.
- Distributed by: Newport Entertainment
- Release dates: 7 March 2017 (Osaka Asian Film Festival); 11 May 2017
- Running time: 111 minutes
- Country: Hong Kong
- Language: Cantonese
- Box office: US$1.9 million (Hong Kong); US$17,429 (international)

29+1 is a 2017 Hong Kong drama film directed by Kearen Pang. It is an adaptation of Pang's own one-woman show, 29+1. The film stars Chrissie Chau and Joyce Cheng and follows two women who share the same birthday and are at life's crossroads as they are about to turn 30.

The film premiered at the 12th Osaka Asian Film Festival where it won the Audience Award. It was released in Hong Kong on 11 May 2017.

== Cast ==
- Chrissie Chau as Christy Lam
- Joyce Cheng as Wong Tin-lok
- Babyjohn Choi as Cheung Hon-ming
- Benjamin Yeung as Tsz-ho
- Elaine Jin as Elaine
- Jan Lamb as Mr. Leung
- Eric Kot as Taxi driver

== Soundtrack ==
=== Featured songs ===
No.	Title	Writer(s)	Performer	Length
1.	"Fake a Smile"	Subyub Lee, Joyce Cheng	Joyce Cheng feat. Subyub Lee	4:32

== Awards and nominations ==
Award ceremony	Category	Recipients	Result
37th Hong Kong Film Awards	Best Director	Kearen Pang	Nominated
37th Hong Kong Film Awards	Best Screenplay	Kearen Pang	Nominated
37th Hong Kong Film Awards	Best Actress	Chrissie Chau	Nominated
37th Hong Kong Film Awards	Best Supporting Actress	Joyce Cheng	Nominated
37th Hong Kong Film Awards	Best Original Film Score	Wong Ngai-lun and Janet Yung	Nominated
37th Hong Kong Film Awards	Best Original Film Song	"Fake a Smile (For Hector)"; Composer, Lyrics and Performer: Subyub Lee	Nominated
37th Hong Kong Film Awards	Best New Director	Kearen Pang	Won
9th China Film Director's Guild Awards	Best Film	29+1	Nominated
9th China Film Director's Guild Awards	Best Actress	Chrissie Chau	Nominated
