= Shock Wave (film) =

2017 Hong Kong film by Herman Yau

- Official film poster

Chinese name
- Traditional Chinese: 拆彈專家
- Simplified Chinese: 拆弹专家
- Literal meaning: Bomb Disposal Specialist
Transcriptions
Standard Mandarin
- Hanyu Pinyin: chāi dàn zhuānjiā
Yue: Cantonese
- Jyutping: Caak3 Daan2 Zyun1 Gaa1
- Directed by: Herman Yau
- Written by: Herman Yau; Erica Li
- Produced by: Andy Lau; Alvin Lam; Chan Pui-wah; Esther Koo; Alice Chan
- Starring: Andy Lau; Jiang Wu; Song Jia; Philip Keung; Ron Ng
- Cinematography: Joe Chan
- Edited by: Azrael Chung
- Music by: Mak Chun Hung
- Production companies: Universe Entertainment; Infinitus Entertainment; Bona Film Group
- Distributed by: Universe Films Distribution
- Release dates: 20 April 2017 (Hong Kong); 28 April 2017 (China)
- Running time: 118 minutes
- Country: Hong Kong
- Language: Cantonese
- Budget: US$23 million
- Box office: US$68.1 million

Shock Wave is a 2017 Hong Kong action film written and directed by Herman Yau, produced by and starring Andy Lau. Released on 20 April 2017 in Hong Kong and 28 April 2017 in all China, the film is Yau and Lau's third collaboration as director and star respectively after 1991's Don't Fool Me and 1999's Fascination Amour.

A standalone sequel to the film, titled Shock Wave 2, began production in February 2019 and wrapped up on 8 May 2019, and was theatrically released on 24 December 2020. It features new characters and a new storyline, with Lau returning as producer and starring in a new role and Yau returning as director.

== Plot ==
Bomb disposal officer Cheung Choi-san of the Explosive Ordnance Disposal Bureau (EOD) has been working undercover in a gang of thieves led by Hung Kai-pang, who specializes in bombs.

Cheung coordinates with his handler, Superintendent Chow, and senior inspector Kong Yiu-wai of the Regional Crime Unit, and manages to arrest a number of Hung's underling, including his younger brother, Hung Kai-piu, after performing a cash vault robbery. He also successfully disposes of a bomb, stopping it from detonating.

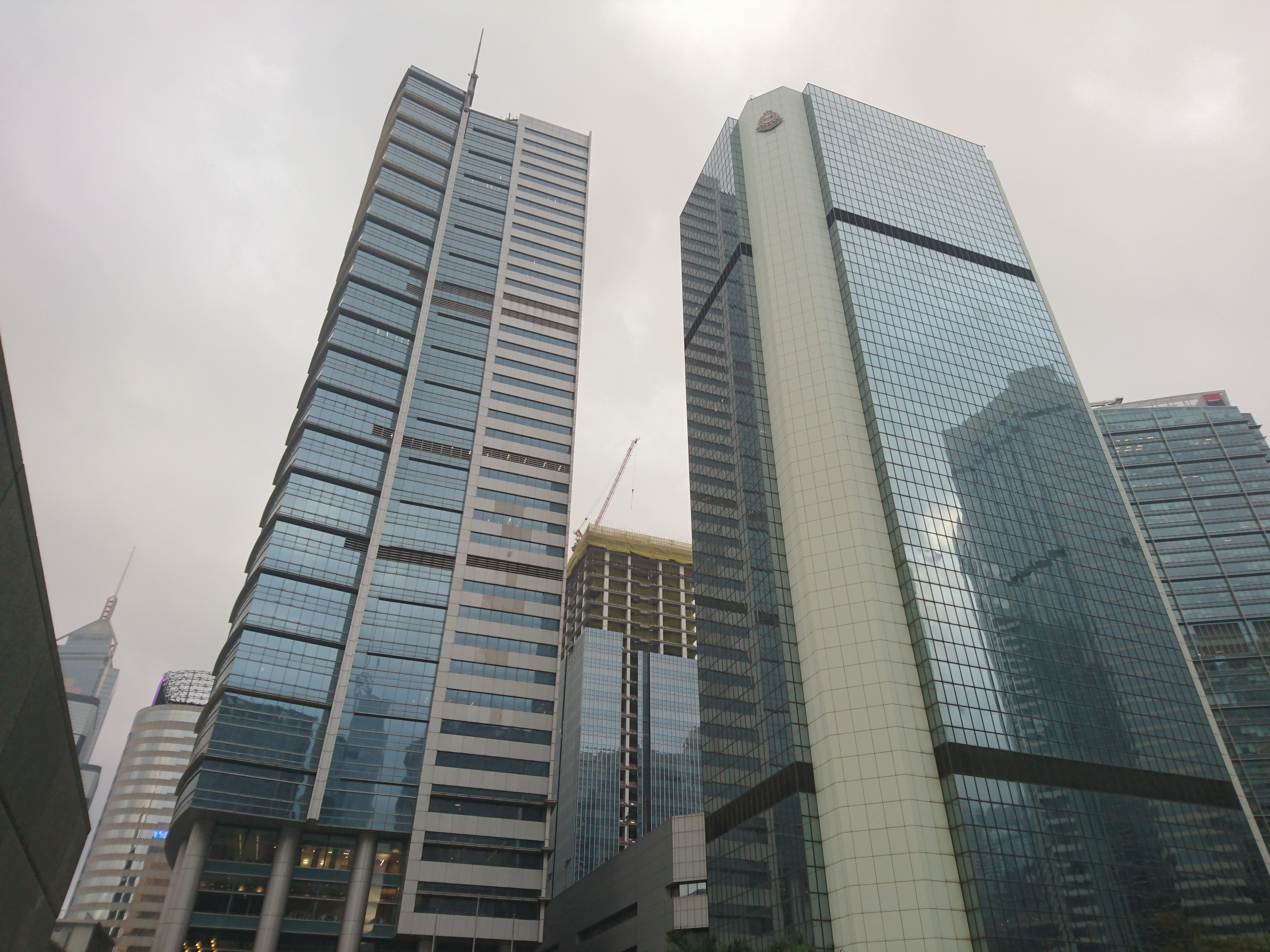
The Hong Kong Police Force's Headquarters in 2018

However, Hung managed to escape arrest and vows for revenge. Six months later, Cheung resumes his position in EOD and is quickly promoted as superintendent of the department and meets a recently divorced primary school teacher, Carmen, and begins to date her.

A year later, Hung has employed a group of mercenary soldiers, delivering morphine and heroin for drug dealers in the Golden Triangle. Man Chung Corporation president Yim Kwok-wing offers him HK$50 million deposit to hijack the Cross-Harbour Tunnel to lure the Hong Kong Government into repurchasing Man Chung's stocks of the Western Harbour Crossing. Meanwhile, after Cheung receives an honor for his undercover duties, Superintendent Chow is killed after a bomb goes off in his car, which Cheung suspects as Hung's doings.

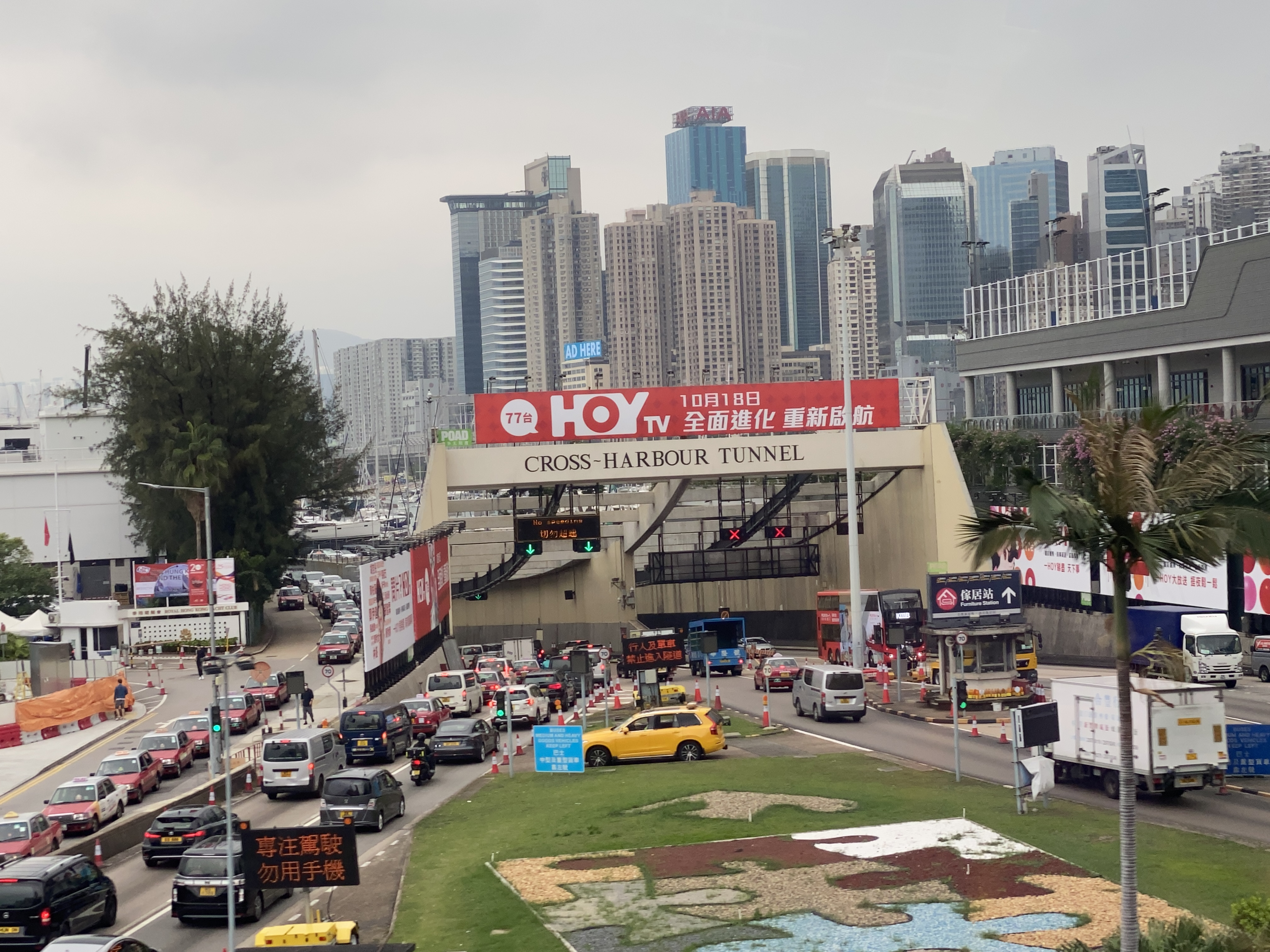
The Cross Harbour Tunnel in 2022

The day after, Hung plants a bomb with a mercury trigger outside of the Revenue Tower, which Cheung successfully disposes, before bringing in three pounds of C4 via a remote control toy truck, which is set to detonate in three minutes. Kong drives Cheung to toss the bomb into Victoria Harbour. Soon after, Hung and his mercenaries hijack the Cross-Harbour Tunnel, trapping hundreds of civilians hostages with 1,000 kg of C4 explosives, placing 500 kg at each entrance of the tunnel.

After making their first killing of a maintenance worker leading to a firefight with the police, Senior Assistant Commissioner of Police Wan Hiu-fung, attempts to negotiate with Hung, who refers himself as "Blast", but Blast demands to speak with Cheung and forces Cheung to release his imprisoned brother by 12AM or he will kill a hostage for every ten minutes late, which Cheung agrees if Blast can promise him to release 100 hostages.

Cheung and Kong escort Kai-piu from prison, who has become a changed man and is reluctant to see his brother, but they were hit by a drunk truck driver on the way, and narrowly makes it back to the tunnel in time before Blast kills a second hostage, but Kai-piu is heavily injured. Blast fulfills his promise and releases 100 hostages, but upon discovering one of them was a young police inspector, Wong Tin-nok, Blasts straps a bomb with four packs of explosives on him. As Blasts sets off the timer to go off in two minutes, Cheung is unable to disable the bomb and Wong is killed by the explosion, devastating several police officers and the press at the scene.

The next morning, the blocked Western and Eastern Harbour Crossing has been opened for the public which strict security checks while Yim is making a fortune when Man Cheung's stocks skyrocket and pays him a commission of HK$500 million. However, Blast is unsatisfied and instructs some of his mercenaries to abduct Yim and force him to transfer HK$1 billion to Blast's bank account before killing him.

In the meantime, Blast also captured Carmen and tied her inside the trunk of a taxi with a grenade in her hand, but Cheung finds and rescues her at a gas station. Blast then demands two helicopters for him to leave a Hong Kong with a couple of hostages including Cheung, and sets off the timer for the 1,000 kg of C4 to go off in an hour until the helicopters arrive.

Cheung then wears some C4 explosives around him and enters the tunnel, threatening Blast to hand out the remote for the 1,000 kg of C4, which startles a couple of the mercenaries and ignites a gunfight where Cheung shoots Blast's leg, while Kong's squad and the Special Duties Unit rush in and takes down the mercenaries while evacuating the civilians, where Kai-piu and some officers and hostages were killed.

Amidst the chaos, Blast shoots Cheung's leg in retaliation and the two exchange fire where Blasts destroys the remote. Blast gains the upper hand when Cheung runs out of ammo and reloads, but Kong severs Blast's arm and the latter is arrested. Cheung rushes to the Hong Kong Island exit of the tunnel while ordering his subordinate, Ben (Ron Ng) to stay at the Kowloon exit and they find the detonating device of the explosives under the trucks at their respective location, but unable to get a clear view.

With less than three minutes before it goes off, Cheung consults the engineer of the tunnel whether the tunnel can sustain 500 kg of C4 exploding, and decides to take a gamble and cut the yellow wire, telling Ben to follow suit if safe. However, the explosives blows up after Cheung cuts the wire, killing him on the spot, so Ben cuts the red wire, but is still heavily injured by the impact. The explosion destroys most of the tunnel but did not affect its structure. Wan announces to reporters that 468 hostages were saved while 38 were killed, along with 43 criminals and 18 officers killed in the incident.

Afterwards, Cheung and other slain officers are given burials at the Gallant Garden where Kong, Carmen, Ben and the others mourn the fallen.

== Cast ==
- Andy Lau as Cheung Choi-san (章在山), superintendent and bomb disposal officer of the Explosive Ordnance Disposal Bureau (EOD).
- Jiang Wu as Hung Kai-pang (洪繼鵬), who nicknamed himself Blast (火爆), a top wanted criminal who is bent on seeking revenge for Cheung's betrayal.
- Song Jia as Carmen Li (李家雯), a divorced teacher who becomes Cheung's girlfriend.
- Philip Keung as Kong Yiu-wai (江耀偉), chief inspector of the Regional Crime Unit who works closely with Cheung.
- Ron Ng as Ben (阿斌), an EOD officer who is Cheung's second-in-command.
- Leo Wang as Hung Kai-piu (洪繼標), Blast's younger brother who was apprehended by the police during Cheung's undercover mission.
- Felix Wong as Officer Chow (周Sir), superintendent of the Regional Crime Unit and Cheung's handler when the latter was working undercover in Blast's gang.
- Shek Sau as Wan Hiu-fung (尹曉風), the Senior Assistant Commissioner of Police.
- Liu Kai-chi as Yim Kwok-wing (閆國榮), a business tycoon and chairman of Man Chung Corporation who operates the Eastern Harbour Crossing and the Western Harbour Crossing.
- Cheung Chun-kit as Stephen (思君), an officer of the Regional Crime Unit under Kong Yiu-wai.
- Louis Cheung as Lam Chun (林俊), a tour guide who is one of the hostages held by Blast in the Cross-Harbour Tunnel.
- Babyjohn Choi as Wong Tin-nok (黃天諾), an off duty officer who is one of the hostages held by Blast in the Cross-Harbour Tunnel.
- Joseph Lee as the chief engineer of the Cross-Harbour Tunnel.
- Felix Lok as Berry (啤梨), Wong Tin-nok's father who is a retired police officer and is one of the hostages held by Blast in the Cross-Harbour Tunnel.
- Wan Yeung-ming as Cheung Tai-chiu (張大釗), a retired police officer who is one of the hostages held by Blast in the Cross-Harbour Tunnel.
- Tony Ho as Kam Chi-kong (甘志剛), nicknamed King Kong, a retired police officer who is one of the hostages held by Blast in the Cross-Harbour Tunnel.
- Ken Lo as Coffee (咖啡), one of Blast's henchmen who was apprehended by the police during Cheung's undercover mission.
- Dion Lam as Ghost (阿鬼), one of Blast's henchmen who escaped during Cheung's undercover mission.
- Kevin Chu as an EOD officer.
- Lee Yee-man as a uniformed policewoman.
- Michael Tong as a mercenary soldier working for Blast.
- Ben Yuen as President Chen (陳總), a Mainland Chinese tour member who is one of the hostages held by Blast in the Cross-Harbour Tunnel.

== Theme song ==
- Getting Used To (慢慢習慣)
  - Singer/Lyricist: Andy Lau
  - Composer: Eric Ng, Kenneth Shih
  - Arranger: Adam Lee
  - Producer: Preston Lee, Jacky Chan

== Production ==
=== Development ===
The project was first announced in September 2014, with Herman Yau and Andrew Lau attached as director and producer respectively, and was set to star Nicholas Tse, Nick Cheung and Julian Cheung, with Tse portraying the main villain. The film was also set to begin production in November of the same year under a budget of HK$90 million.

However, the project was seemingly postponed indefinitely until March 2016, where the film was re-announced at the 2016 Hong Kong Filmart. While Yau remained as the film's director, Andy Lau was announced to produce and star in the new film, with no mention of previous reported cast members. With a new budget of US$23 million, the film is produced by Universe Entertainment, Bona Film Group and Lau's new production company, Infinitus Entertainment. The film's planned climax will feature a bomb threat taking place in the Cross-Harbour Tunnel.

=== Filming ===
On 17 April 2016, director Yau announced on his Facebook account that filming for Shock Wave will begin the following day on 18 April. On Labour Day (1 May 2016), Yau updated the filming progress on his account with location scouting images where Lau and crew members were present. On 6 May 2016, reporters visited the film set for the filming of an indoors explosion scene, where Lau demonstrated safety measures of filming the explosion to the visiting reporters with Yau, while also demonstrating swift bomb disposal techniques. On 5 June 2016, a bomb disposal scene was filmed outside of the Revenue Tower in Wan Chai, where Lau wore a 70-pound heavy bomb disposal suit. Actors Philip Keung, Ron Ng, Louis Cheung and Babyjohn Choi were also present during that day. Filming officially wrapped up on 4 July 2016, after filming its final scene at a 1:1 scale set of the Cross-Harbour Tunnel built by the production team.

== Release ==
Shock Wave was theatrically released in Hong Kong on 20 April 2017. The film also closed the 19th Far East Film Festival on 29 April 2017 and was also shown at the 57th Vienna International Film Festival on 20 October 2017.

== Reception ==
=== Critical reception ===
On Rotten Tomatoes, Shock Wave has an approval rating of 75% based on 8 reviews, with an average rating of 7/10.

Elizabeth Kerr of The Hollywood Reporter praised the film's action sequences by action choreographer Dion Lam, the cinematography director Herman Yau for upending action film conventions but criticizes the characters' drawn out personalities. Edmund Lee of the South China Morning Post gave the film a score of 3/5 stars and praises the film's engaging action sequences and its absorbing look at bomb disposal while criticizes its logic and director Yau's half-hearted attempt at characterisation. Angelin Yeoh of The Star gave the film a score of 8/10 praising the film's high octane action sequences, the levels of tension and sense of intrigue that it offers and calls it an "exciting, adrenaline rush of a movie about everyday heroes."

Gabriel Chong of MovieXclusive gave the film a score of 3/5 and calls it "loud, action-packed and frequently thrilling" but "lacks compelling story or characters". Boon Chan of The Straits Times gave the film a score of 2.5/5 and notes the film's protagonist as "self-sacrificing and saintly" and not particularly interesting as a result and calls the film a "workman-like and heavy-handed effort that is unlikely to knock anyone's sock off."

=== Box office ===
In Hong Kong, Shock Wave opened No. 1 on 20 April 2017, grossing HK$1.35 million on its opening day. During its opening weekend, the film grossed HK$7.98 million and was placed at No. 3. On its third weekend, the film remained No. 3 at the box office, grossing HK$6.71 million, with a total gross of HK$22,229,332 accumulated by then. Shock Wave grossed a total of HK$25,360,088 at the Hong Kong box office during its theatrical run in the territory, making it the second-highest grossing domestic film of Hong Kong in 2017.

In Taiwan, the film opened on 21 April 2017. In its capital, Taipei, the film grossed NT$2.48 million on its opening weekend at No. 4. On its second weekend, the film grossed NT$1.11 million and has grossed a total NT$5.05 million by then. On its third weekend, the film grossed NT$600,000 and grossed a total NT$6.53 million by then. On its fourth weekend, the film grossed NT$160,000, accumulating a total gross of NT$6.95 million by that time. Along with the rest of Taiwan, the film grossed a total of NT$17,740,000 in the country.

In China, the film premiered on 28 April 2017 and debuted No.1 during its opening weekend where it grossed ¥168,772,602. On its second weekend, the film grossed ¥49,268,798, with a total gross of ¥356,695,899 by then. On its third weekend, the film grossed ¥5,193,102, with a total gross of ¥385,070,099 by then. By its fourth weekend, the film grossed ¥2,294,103, accumulating a total gross of ¥390,995,597 by then. The film has grossed a total of ¥400,496,000 at the Chinese box office by the end of its theatrical run.

As of 25 May 2017, Shock Wave has grossed a total of US$68,076,339.44 worldwide (total box office gross from Hong Kong, Taiwan, China, Australia and United Kingdom).

== Awards and nominations ==
Ceremony	Category	Recipient	Results
37th Hong Kong Film Awards	Best Film	Shock Wave	Nominated
37th Hong Kong Film Awards	Best Director	Herman Yau	Nominated
37th Hong Kong Film Awards	Best Actor	Andy Lau	Nominated
37th Hong Kong Film Awards	Best Supporting Actor	Philip Keung	Won
37th Hong Kong Film Awards	Best Film Editing	Azrael Chung	Nominated
37th Hong Kong Film Awards	Best Sound Design	Nip Kei-wing, Yip Siu-kei	Nominated
37th Hong Kong Film Awards	Best Visual Effects	Yee Kwok-leung, Chu Tak-pui, Jules Lin, Loki Ho	Nominated
1st Profima International Film Fest & Awards	Best Supporting Actor	Philip Keung	Won
1st Kongest Film Awards
1st Kongest Film Awards	Best Film	Shock Wave	Nominated
1st Kongest Film Awards	Best Director	Herman Yau	Nominated
1st Kongest Film Awards	Best Actor	Andy Lau	Won
1st Kongest Film Awards	My Favorite Hong Kong Film	Shock Wave	Won

== Sequel ==
During a celebration event for the film's box office success on 4 May 2017, producer and star Andy Lau unofficially announced a sequel to Shock Wave would be made in response to the film's success. On 16 March 2018, Universe Entertainment officially confirmed that a sequel, titled Shock Wave 2, would be made and released a teaser film poster. Lau returned as producer and star while Herman Yau also returned as director. Daniel Lam, president of Universe Entertainment, revealed that the screenplay of the sequel was being developed. Yau also revealed that Shock Wave 2 would be a standalone sequel with new characters and a new story line.

Production for Shock Wave 2 officially began in February 2019 and wrapped up on 8 May 2019. The film was theatrically released on 24 December 2020.

== See also ==
- Andy Lau filmography
