= Paradox (2017 film) =

2017 Hong Kong film by Wilson Yip

- Official film poster

Chinese name
- Traditional Chinese: 殺破狼・貪狼
- Simplified Chinese: 杀破狼・贪狼
Transcriptions
Standard Mandarin
- Hanyu Pinyin: Shā Pò Láng・Tān Láng
Yue: Cantonese
- Jyutping: Saat3 Po3 Long4・Taam1 Long4
- Directed by: Wilson Yip
- Screenplay by: Jill Leung; Nick Cheuk
- Produced by: Soi Cheang; Paco Wong
- Starring: Louis Koo; Gordon Lam; Wu Yue; Chris Collins; Tony Jaa
- Cinematography: Kenneth Tse
- Edited by: Wong Hoi
- Music by: Comfort Chan; Ken Chan
- Production companies: Sun Entertainment Film Group; Bona Film Group; Alibaba Pictures; Sunny Side Up (Never) Limited; Sil-Metropole Organisation; Wish Films; Flagship Entertainment Group; Shanghai PMF Media; YL Entertainment and Sports (YLES); Rock Partner Film; Huoerguosi Bona Media; Aether Film Production
- Distributed by: Bravos Pictures
- Release dates: 15 August 2017 (HKIFF Cine Fan); 17 August 2017 (China); 25 August 2017 (Hong Kong)
- Running time: 98 minutes
- Countries: Hong Kong; China; Thailand
- Languages: Cantonese; English; Thai
- Budget: US$14.5 million
- Box office: US$80.84 million

Paradox (Chinese: 殺破狼・貪狼) is a 2017 neo-noir Hong Kong action film directed by Wilson Yip, co-produced by Soi Cheang, with action direction by Sammo Hung. Written by Jill Leung and Nick Cheuk, the film stars Louis Koo as a police inspector who travels to Pattaya to search for his teenage daughter and is aided by local detectives played by Tony Jaa and Wu Yue. Along the way, he encounters the mastermind of an organ trafficking gang (Chris Collins) who colludes with a local political aide (Gordon Lam), leading to a series of hot pursuit. Paradox is the third installment of the SPL film series, following the 2005 film, SPL: Sha Po Lang and 2015's SPL II: A Time for Consequences. The film was released in China on 17 August 2017 and in Hong Kong on 25 August 2017 and has grossed US$80.84 million worldwide against a budget of US$14.5 million.

The film was well received by critics, praised for action director Hung's choreography, which won him the Hong Kong Film Award for Best Action Choreography, and Koo's physical and emotional performance, which netted him both the Asian Film Award for Best Actor and Hong Kong Film Award for Best Actor, winning his film first acting awards. Aside from winning the two aforementioned awards, Paradox also won Best Sound Design and received six other nominations at the 37th Hong Kong Film Awards, including Best Film, Best Director, Best Supporting Actor, Best New Performer, Best Cinematography and Best Film Editing.

== Plot ==
When Hong Kong police inspector Lee Chung-chi (Louis Koo) is informed about the sudden disappearance of his 16-year-old daughter Lee Wing-chi (Hanna Chan) during her trip to Pattaya, he decides to travel to Thailand to search for his daughter's whereabouts. There Lee receives assistance from local Chinese detective Chui Kit (Wu Yue) and his Thai colleague Tak (Tony Jaa) and also encounters American gangster Sacha (Chris Collins).

Clues connect the disappearance of Lee's daughter to a case involving the mayoral candidate of Pattaya's urgent need for a heart transplant. Lee also suspects the mayoral candidate's assistant Cheng Hon-sau (Gordon Lam) of colluding with Sacha to abduct his daughter. While suffering from the loss of his beloved daughter, Lee kidnaps corrupt officer Ban (Ken Lo) in order to get to the bottom of the case. As a result, Lee becomes a nationwide wanted criminal. Seeking revenge, Lee can only ask Chui to assist him in finding the whereabouts of his daughter.

In an attempt to gather evidence to locate Lee's daughter, Chui and Tak arrive at an apartment owned by a Taxi driver who has dashcam video of Lee's daughter but Sacha and his gang reach him first. Chui and Tak get into a fight with Sacha and his gang. Chui subdues Sacha's men while Tak pursues and fights Sacha. Although Tak dominates and wins the fight by kicking Sacha off a building rooftop, Tak saves Sacha from falling and attempts to arrest him, but Sacha feigns defeat then throws a bystander child off the building. Tak saves the child, but is kicked off the building by Sacha, resulting in Tak's death. Under interrogation, Ban reveals the location where Lee's daughter is stored. On his way there, Lee's car collides with Cheng's car, which is carrying his daughter. Police pursue Lee after spotting a bloody Ban. Lee leaves Ban behind and barely escapes, while his daughter is brought to Sacha's headquarters by Cheng. Ban is then killed in the hospital. Police commissioner Chai (Vithaya Pansringarm), who is aware of the plot to save the mayoral candidate, tells Chui to drop the case, warning that a cover-up is already happening and that their own lives are already at risk.

With the heart transplant operation complete, Cheng orders Chai to have the police kill Sacha and his henchmen. Before the police enter, Lee rushes into Sacha's headquarters, defeating many of his henchmen, but is injured due to being overwhelmed. Chai mandates that the police operation should continue so that Lee is killed as well. Angered at this, Chui punches Chai, enters to save Lee, and continues the battle against Sacha and his henchmen. Chui managed to kill and injure Sacha's remaining men and engages in a brutal fight with Sacha. At Chai's order, the police SWAT team, storm Sacha's headquarters, killing the remainder of Sacha's henchmen, forcing Lee, Chui and Sacha to hide.

Chui reveals the awful truth to Lee, who goes on to find his daughter's corpse and grieve. Chui manages to almost defeat Sacha, but Sacha uses a fire extinguisher to knock out Chui and attempts to kill him with a bonesaw, but a raging Lee interrupts. Locked in a struggle, Lee savagely bites Sacha's ear and fatally slashes Sacha's throat with the bonesaw. Chai arrives and nearly executes Lee, but stops at Chui's urging at Chai reminding him that they are still cops. Chai then shows Chui that Chui's wife has been kidnapped at the behest of Cheng.

Lee volunteers to save Chui's wife. Chui drops him off at the mayoral candidate's residence, during the birthday celebration of the mayoral candidate's granddaughter. Lee handcuffs Chui to the steering wheel of his vehicle to avoid interference and breaks into the sleeping mayoral candidate's room and listens to his daughter's heart. Cheng appears and tells Lee that he, not the mayoral candidate, is the one behind the crimes. Lee asks if Chui and his wife will be left alone with his own death, Cheng agrees. Lee kills Cheng and spares the mayoral candidate. Having lost his wife and daughter and driven over the edge, Lee turns the gun on himself and Chui hears the sound of a gunshot outside.

Chui's wife is released; she eventually gives birth. Chui is initially elated at the childbirth, but his happiness fades as he remembers Lee's sacrifice for him.

== Cast ==
- Louis Koo as Lee Chung-chi (李忠志)
- Gordon Lam as Cheng Hon-sau (鄭漢守)
- Wu Yue as Chui Kit (崔傑)
- Chris Collins as Sacha (沙查)
- Tony Jaa as Tak (阿德)
- Michelle Saram as Lee Chung-chi's wife (guest appearance)
- Jacky Cai as Siu-man (小曼)
- Ken Lo as Ban (阿斌)
- Hanna Chan as Lee Wing-chi (李穎芝)
- Vithaya Pansringarm as Commissioner Chai (猜局長)
- Sompob Benjathikul as Mayor Azis (阿齋茲市長)
- Siraphun Wattanajinda as Soei (桑兒)

== Production ==
Filming for Paradox began in Bangkok on 29 October 2016, where a filming commencement ceremony was held which was attended by producers Cheang Pou-soi and Paco Wong, director Wilson Yip, action director Sammo Hung and cast members Louis Koo, Gordon Lam, Tony Jaa, Wu Yue, Chris Collins and Ken Lo. For his role as an assistant for a Bangkok mayoral candidate, Lam learned to speak Thai from Lo, who is fluent in the language. On 26 December 2016, it was announced that filming for the film's action scenes have all been complete. Production for Paradox officially wrapped up after over three months of shooting in Hong Kong and Thailand in February 2017 with a wrap-up banquet held on the 4th on the same month attended by the cast and crew members.

== Release ==
Paradox made its world premiere as the Opening Film of the 2017 Cine Fan Summer International Film Festival organised by the Hong Kong International Film Festival Society on 15 August 2017 before being theatrically released in China in MX4D and China Film Giant Screen on 17 August and in Hong Kong on 25 August 2017.

== Reception ==
=== Critical response ===
Paradox received mostly positive reviews, with critics praising Louis Koo's performance and Sammo Hung's action choreography. Edmund Lee of the South China Morning Post rated the film a score of 3.5/5 stars, praising Koo's physical and emotional performance, choreographer Sammo Hung's ferocious action scenes. Elizabeth Kerr of The Hollywood Reporter praised Hung's creative action choreography, writer Jill Leung's use of time to uncover the protagonist's indiscretions and cinematographer Kenneth Tse's use of colors. James Marsh of Screen Anarchy praised Hung's brutal action choreography, Koo's performance as having "gone above and above" and concludes his review by stating that the film "packs one hell of a punch".

=== Box office ===
In China, the film grossed ¥212,476,100 during its opening weekend. debuting at No. 2. By its second weekend, the film has dropped to No. 4 and has accumulated a total gross of ¥440,437,600 by then. On its third week, the film grossed ¥12,810,300 and has grossed a total ¥502,799,402 by then. During its fourth week, the film grossed ¥2,818,498, accumulating a total gross of ¥518,116,101 so far. The film has grossed a total of ¥521,573,000 in China.

Released on 25 August 2017 in Hong Kong, the film grossed HK$3,153,559 during its opening weekend, debuting at No.4. During its second week, the film grossed HK$3,551,677, accumulating a total gross of HK6,705,236 by then. On its third week, the film grossed HK$872,290 and has grossed a total of HK$7,577,526 so far.

Paradox has grossed a total of US$80.84 million from Hong Kong, mainland China, Taiwan and Thailand.

== Awards and nominations ==
Ceremony	Category	Recipient	Result
37th Hong Kong Film Awards	Best Film	Paradox	Nominated
37th Hong Kong Film Awards	Best Director	Wilson Yip	Nominated
37th Hong Kong Film Awards	Best Actor	Louis Koo	Won
37th Hong Kong Film Awards	Best Supporting Actor	Gordon Lam	Nominated
37th Hong Kong Film Awards	Best New Performer	Hanna Chan	Nominated
37th Hong Kong Film Awards	Best Cinematography	Kenny Tse	Nominated
37th Hong Kong Film Awards	Best Film Editing	Wong Hoi	Nominated
37th Hong Kong Film Awards	Best Action Choreography	Sammo Hung	Won
37th Hong Kong Film Awards	Best Sound Design	Kinson Tsang, George Lee	Won
12th Asian Film Awards	Best Actor	Louis Koo	Won
12th Asian Film Awards	Best Action Film	Paradox	Won
24th Hong Kong Film Critics Society Awards	Film of Merit	Paradox	Won
12th Hong Kong Film Directors' Guild Award	Best Actor	Louis Koo	Won
54th Golden Horse Awards	Best Action Choreography	Sammo Hung	Nominated
Weibo Star Awards 2017	Best Actor	Louis Koo	Won
Weibo Star Awards 2017	Best Actor	Gordon Lam	Nominated
23rd Huading Awards	Best Supporting Actor	Gordon Lam	Nominated
MOVIE 6 Hong Kong Film Awards Public Voting	Best Film	Paradox	Won
MOVIE 6 Hong Kong Film Awards Public Voting	Best Actor	Louis Koo	Won
1st Kongest Film Awards
1st Kongest Film Awards	Best Film	Paradox	Nominated
1st Kongest Film Awards	Best Director	Wilson Yip	Nominated
1st Kongest Film Awards	Best Actor	Louis Koo	Nominated
1st Kongest Film Awards	My Favorite Hong Kong Film	Paradox	Nominated

== See also ==
- Sammo Hung filmography
