= Journey to the West: The Demons Strike Back =

2017 Chinese-Hong Kong film by Tsui Hark

- Theatrical release poster

Chinese name
- Traditional Chinese: 西遊伏妖篇
- Simplified Chinese: 西游伏妖篇
- Literal meaning: Journey to the West: Demons Story
Transcriptions
Standard Mandarin
- Hanyu Pinyin: Xī Yóu Fú Yāo Piān
Yue: Cantonese
- Jyutping: Sai1 Jau4 hFeok6 Jiu2 Pin1
- Directed by: Tsui Hark
- Written by: Stephen Chow; Tsui Hark; Kelvin Lee
- Based on: Journey to the West by Wu Cheng'en
- Produced by: Stephen Chow; Tsui Hark; Nansun Shi
- Starring: Kris Wu; Kenny Lin; Yang Yiwei; Mengke Bateer; Yao Chen; Jelly Lin
- Cinematography: Choi Sung-fai
- Edited by: Lin Li; Tsui Hark; Jason Zen
- Music by: Raymond Wong
- Production companies: Wanda Media; Alibaba Pictures; China Film Group; Tianjin Maoyan Culture Media; Stars Overseas; Film Workshop
- Distributed by: Lian Ray Pictures
- Release date: 28 January 2017
- Running time: 108 minutes
- Countries: China; Hong Kong
- Language: Mandarin
- Budget: $63.9 million
- Box office: $248.8 million

Journey to the West: The Demons Strike Back (Chinese: 西遊伏妖篇) is a 2017 fantasy adventure comedy film directed by Tsui Hark. The film is co-produced by China and Hong Kong, and is a sequel to Stephen Chow's 2013 film Journey to the West: Conquering the Demons. It was produced and co-written by both Tsui and Chow.

The film follows the adventures of Tang Sanzang and his disciples Sun Wukong, Zhu Bajie, and Sha Wujing after the events of the first film; all four roles have been recast. The film was released in China by Lianrui Pictures on 28 January 2017 in MX4D, 4DX, IMAX 3D and 3D.

== Plot ==
Tang Sanzang dreams of becoming a giant and retrieving Sutra, where his master rewards him a halo in India. He awakens from his dream in an alley in a village of circus performers with his three disciples: Sun Wukong; Zhu Bajie; and Sha Wujing. Tang encourages Wukong to perform for the villagers, who refuses. An angered Tang calls Wukong a "bad monkey", which causes him to ransack the village. The terrified villagers present the group with money and food for their travels, but Wukong continues wreaking havoc. That night, Tang whips Wukong for his disobedience.

The next morning, Tang goes to find water for their breakfast congee and comes across a house. Its host, a maiden in a splendid outfit, welcomes them all in for breakfast with her companions. Wukong, however, sees through their disguises as spider demons; he purposely provokes them until she and the others show their true form. During the subsequent battle, the demons come together to form one huge spider, poisoning Wujing who bloats into a fish-like creature. Wukong defeats the spider and Tang attempts to exorcise her, but Wukong kills the spider against Tang's wishes. Later that night, the enraged Wukong discusses with the other disciples his plans to kill Tang, but the others fear his Buddha Palm powers. Tang overhears this conversation and prays to Buddha to help him, confessing that he actually does not know, or have His powers. Bajie overhears this and tells Wukong, who challenges Tang to a fight. Just as Wukong is about to strike, a blinding ray of light shines from the heavens and he retreats.

The next day, the group pass into the capital city of the Biqiu Kingdom and its minister Jiu Gong comes out to greet them and bring them to see the king; an immature and childlike man who likes to play games. The king orders a talentless Tang to perform for him, so Wukong pastes an "obedience sticker" on Tang to make copy his actions and perform stunts for the king. Wukong, however, goes too far and makes Tang slap the king continuously, who throws them all out. Tang orders Wukong to return and apologize, Wukong reveals that he slapped the king to make him reveal his true appearance as the Red Boy. Tang turns the Red Boy into a toy after a brief fight and gives it to Jiu Gong, releasing the true king of Biqiu from his cage under the throne. As a reward for helping him, the king presents them with a beautiful maiden, Felicity, to accompany them on their travels. As Felicity dances for them, Tang is reminded of his deceased lover, Duan.

As they set off, Wukong realizes that Felicity is actually a demon. Felicity takes out Wujing's nose plugs, allowing him to sneeze out the poison and turn him back into his human form. Tang, however, does not believe him, so they visit Felicity's home village. Enraged with Tang's lack of trust in him, Wukong destroys the whole village, killing everyone. Tang stops him from killing Felicity, angering Wukong, who confesses that she is actually the White Bone Spirit while the whole village was an illusion she conjured. Wukong enlarges himself and swallows Tang. At that moment, Jiu Gong and Red Boy arrive and witness Wukong falling for their trick.

Jiu Gong and Red Boy had deliberately sent Felicity to cause strife between Tang and Wukong, to make Wukong kill his master. Wukong spits Tang out, but since they were aware of the truth; they only played along so that Jiu Gong would reveal her true form. Jiu Gong creates an elemental illusion of Buddhas surrounding Wukong, which he utilizes to fight her. The real Buddha uses his giant palm to destroy the false Buddhas and reveals Jiu Gong's real identity as the Immortal Golden Vulture.

Afterwards, Tang heads back to find a dying Felicity, who was mortally wounded during the battle. He has no choice but to free her soul as she is considered too much of a demon. Before dying, Felicity asks Tang if he loves her. Tang replies that he has only one person in his heart and he blesses Felicity's spirit; returning her to heaven. Tang and Wukong make amends, and together with Wujing and Bajie, they continue their journey to the West through the Taklamakan Desert.

== Cast ==
- Kris Wu as Tang Sanzang.
- Lin Gengxin as Sun Wukong.
- Yang Yiwei as Zhu Bajie.
  - Wang Duo as the handsome Bajie.
- Mengke Bateer as Sha Wujing.
- Yao Chen as Jiu Gong/Immortal Golden Vulture.
- Lin Yun as Felicity/White Bone Spirit.
- Wang Likun as the spider demon.
- Bao Bei'er as the king of Biqiu.
  - Bei'er also portrays the Red Boy in the disguise of Biqiu king.
- Da Peng as a Taoist priest.
- Cheng Sihan as Tang's teacher who only appears in Tang's dream.
- Shu Qi as Duan, Tang's deceased lover who make a cameo appearance in flashback scenes and in Tang Sanzang's imagination.

Director Tsui Hark and producer Stephen Chow make an uncredited cameo appearance as a theater employees in the post-credit scene.

== Production ==
Principal photography began in October 2015. This was the first major collaboration between Chow and Tsui. Previously, during Spring Festival 2016, Tsui Hark had only a cameo role in Chow's The Mermaid. Here, however, Tsui directed the film, which was written by Chow, who was also the executive producer. The film was shot in 3D. The companies that produced and/or invested in the film are: China Film Group Corporation, Star Overseas, Hehe (Shanghai) Pictures, Xiangshan Zeyue Media, Shanghai Tao Piao Piao Entertainment, Wanda Media, Dadi Century Films (Beijing), Guangzhou JinYi Media Corporation, Zhejiang HengDian Entertainment, Tianjin Maoyan Media, Maxtimes Culture (Tianjin) Films, Lianrui (Shanghai) Pictures, Huayi Brothers Media Group, Shanghai New Culture Media Group, Dongshen (Shanghai) Pictures, Black Ant Shanghai Entertainment, Horgos Hehe Pictures, Horgos Lianrui Pictures, Wuxi Huichi Entertainment and Shanghai Mengchacha Entertainment Investment.

== Release ==
The film was released in China on 28 January 2017, the start of the Chinese New Year holiday. In December 2016, Sony Pictures acquired the North American and multi-territory distribution rights to the film for the U.S., Canada, the U.K., Australia, New Zealand and much of Asia outside the Mainland China (including Taiwan, Singapore, Malaysia, Brunei, Thailand, the Philippines, Vietnam, Laos and Cambodia). The film opened simultaneously with its Chinese release (28 January) in Malaysia, Vietnam, Singapore, Cambodia, Australia and New Zealand. The UK and U.S. release followed on 3 February 2017, with that in Indonesia, the Philippines and Thailand taking place later in the month.

=== Promotion ===
Journey to the West: Demon Chapter had its first teaser released in China on 8 November 2016.

== Box office ==
=== Pre-release ===
The Demons Strike Back was made on a production budget of 440 million yuan ($63.9 million) with an additional 140 million yuan ($20 million) spent on marketing (promotion and advertising) materials. The film was highly anticipated in China by both industry insiders and ordinary moviegoers and was projected to emerge very successful at the box office, partly due to the robust demand and success of the first film. Moreover, in its domestic market, the film was released during the Chinese New Year period, the most lucrative time of the year for local films. The holiday, which is also known as Spring Festival, is a coveted release period in the country in which millions of Chinese moviegoers – both casual and hardcore fans – flock to theaters in what is regarded as the busiest moviegoing period on the planet. Since the period is a strategic time to release films with blockbuster potential, The Demons Strike Back faced competition. Nine other Chinese-made films opened on the same day and films such as Kung Fu Yoga, Buddies in India, Duckweed, The Village of No Return and Boonie Bears: Entangled World posed a box office challenge for the film. The film pre-sold more than 100 million yuan ($14.54 million) worth of tickets, according to the film distributors and promoters, breaking the previous record held by Chow's The Mermaid.

The main draw of the film has been credited to Tsui Hark who has directed some of the highest-grossing films in China, including the recent The Taking of Tiger Mountain and Young Detective Dee: Rise of the Sea Dragon. Chow's involvement in the project is also considered a factor in the early momentum for the film, but the impact of the cast is seen as mixed.

=== Theatrical run ===
The film opened 28 January 2017 and grossed over 345–360 million yuan ($50–52 million) on its opening day. Data from research group Entgroup showed that the movie had 103,065 screenings and registered 8.7 million admissions on Saturday, the busiest day ever at the Chinese box office. This broke the record for the biggest single/opening day for a local film in China, dethroning The Mermaid's former record of 270 million yuan in 2016. The record for all films is that of Furious 7's 391 million yuan opening day sales. Before this, the film made an estimated 10.45 million yuan ($1.5 million) from midnight previews on Friday night. It earned 209 million yuan ($30.4 million) on its second day, Sunday, bringing its two-day cumulative total to 553 million yuan ($80.3 million), with some figures going as high as $83 million. This broke the record for the biggest Saturday-Sunday opening in China, created a year earlier by the Hollywood film Star Wars: The Force Awakens. In IMAX the film broke the record for the biggest single/opening day with $4.2 million from 390 screens and the best Chinese New Year opening day for IMAX. It came in third for all titles, behind Warcraft and Furious 7. In two days, the gross was worth $7.4 million, the second best, behind The Force Awakens.

After its record-breaking openings, The Demons Strikes Back began to witness significant falls in accruing revenues from its third day onwards. In three days, the film made a combined 728 million yuan ($105.9 million) compared to The Mermaid's 770 million yuan ($117.4 million) and the discrepancy widened in the following days. One major reason for the film's fall in demand was the negative reception and bad word-of-mouth from critics and audiences that took a mounting toll on the film's box office performance. Its average user ratings from China's major online film portals such as Douban, Maoyan, Gewara, and Mtime were among the lowest for such a wide release. By comparison, in Douban, The Demons Strike Back scored just 6.9/10 compared to The Mermaid's 8.0/10.

Outside the Middle Kingdom, Sony Pictures acquired the rights to distribute the film in many territories. The studio released the film simultaneously across six markets with the Chinese premiere, realising a two-day weekend haul of $2.2 million from 362 screens.

Its worldwide box office total now (as of 16 February 2017) stands at $239.5 million, with $232 million from China's market. It also has become the highest-grossing film in Tsui Hark's career and the highest-grossing film among the Journey to the West novel adaptations.

== Critical reception ==
On Rotten Tomatoes 58% of critics have given the film a positive review based on 12 reviews, with an average rating of 5.76/10. On Metacritic, the film has a weighted average score of 59 out of 100 based on 4 critic reviews, indicating "mixed or average reviews".

RogerEbert.com gave the movie a glowing review and a 3 out of 4 rating. They called the collaboration between Stephen Chow and Tsui Hark a "worthy fusion of two of the film world's most brilliant stars" and praised the film saying, "it's got more imagination in one nimble limb than a Fast & Furious sequel or a Star Wars prequel can lay claim to in their whole battered chassis." The Hollywood Reporter gave a mixed review, praising the film for its action sequences and special effects, but criticizing its screenplay, narration and weak character development. South China Morning Post also criticized the performance of its leads.

=== Accolades ===
Award	Year	Category	Nominee	Result	Ref.
37th Hong Kong Film Awards	2018	Best Art Direction	Yoshihito Akatsuka, Liao Huei-li, Guo Zhongshan	Nominated	
37th Hong Kong Film Awards	2018	Best Costume Make Up Design	Bruce Yu, Lee Pik-kwan	Won	
37th Hong Kong Film Awards	2018	Best Sound Design	Kinson Tsang, Yiu Chun-hin	Nominated	
37th Hong Kong Film Awards	2018	Best Visual Effects	Park Young-soo, Kim Wook	Nominated	
23rd Huading Awards	2018	Best Supporting Actress	Lin Yun	Nominated	
