= Tomorrow Is Another Day (2017 film) =

2017 Hong Kong film by Chan Tai-lee

Tomorrow is Another Day
- Traditional Chinese: 黃金花
- Directed by: Chan Tai-lee
- Written by: Chan Tai-lee
- Produced by: Kin-Hung Ng; Winnie Tsang; Raymond Pak-Ming Wong
- Starring: Teresa Mo Shun-kwan; Ray Lui; Ling Man-lung; Bonnie Xian Seli; Prudence Liew; Candice Yu; Elvina Kong; June Siu-ha Lam
- Cinematography: Radium Cheung
- Edited by: Nose Chui Hing Chan
- Music by: Day Tai
- Production companies: Pegasus Motion Pictures; Golden Scene; Local Production; Film Development Fund of Hong Kong
- Distributed by: Golden Scene
- Release dates: 13 November 2017 (Hong Kong Asian Film Festival); 12 April 2018
- Running time: 91 minutes
- Country: Hong Kong
- Language: Cantonese

Tomorrow is Another Day (Chinese: 黃金花) is a 2017 Hong Kong drama film written and directed by Chan Tai-lee, in his feature film directorial debut, and starring Teresa Mo and Ling Man-lung, in his feature film acting debut. The film follows a middle-aged woman struggling to take care of her autistic son for 20 years and discovered that her husband is having an extramarital affair.

The film premiered in a special presentation at Hong Kong Asian Film Festival 2017, and was released in theatres on April 12, 2018 in Hong Kong. The film receives positive reviews, and Teresa Mo also won the Best Actress Award for the 37th Hong Kong Film Awards.

== Plot summary ==
The movie follows Mrs. Wong (Teresa Mo), a middle-aged housewife living in a Hong Kong public housing estate, as she cares for her autistic and mentally handicapped son, Kwong (Ling Man-lung), whose self-harming outbursts strain her marriage to Mr. Wong (Ray Lui Leung-wai), a driving instructor. Mr. Wong grows distant and begins an affair with a manipulative younger woman, Daisy (Bonnie Xian Seli). After discovering the infidelity, Mrs. Wong initially hides her pain to maintain stability for Kwong, but her husband eventually leaves the family to live with his mistress.

Devastated and financially strained, Mrs. Wong receives unexpected support from women in her community, who empathize with her plight. However, overwhelmed by despair, she secretly plots to murder Daisy. Her scheme is discovered by the other housewives, forcing her to confront the consequences of her actions. The film concludes with Mrs. Wong reflecting on her fractured family and the emotional toll of caregiving, while finding fleeting solace in her bond with Kwong.

== Cast ==
- Teresa Mo as Wong Kam-fa, a mother who struggles to raise Hiu-kwong for life.
  - Hedwig Tam as young Wong Kam-fa.
- Ling Man-lung as Wong Hiu-kwong, Kam-fa's autistic son.
- Ray Lui as Wong Yuen-shan, Kam-fa's husband who is suspected of having an affair outside the home.
- Prudence Liew as Mrs. Chan, Kam-fa's friend.
- Bonnie Xian Seli as the mistress in Wong Yuen-shan's affair.
- Candice Yu as Keung's wife, Kam-fa's friend.
- Joyce Cheng as dancing teacher (cameo appearance)
- Elvina Kong as Mrs. Lee, Kam-fa's friend.
- June Lam as Mrs Cheung, Kam-fa's friend.
