= Ling Man-lung =

Hong Kong actor (born 1986/1987)

- 凌文龍
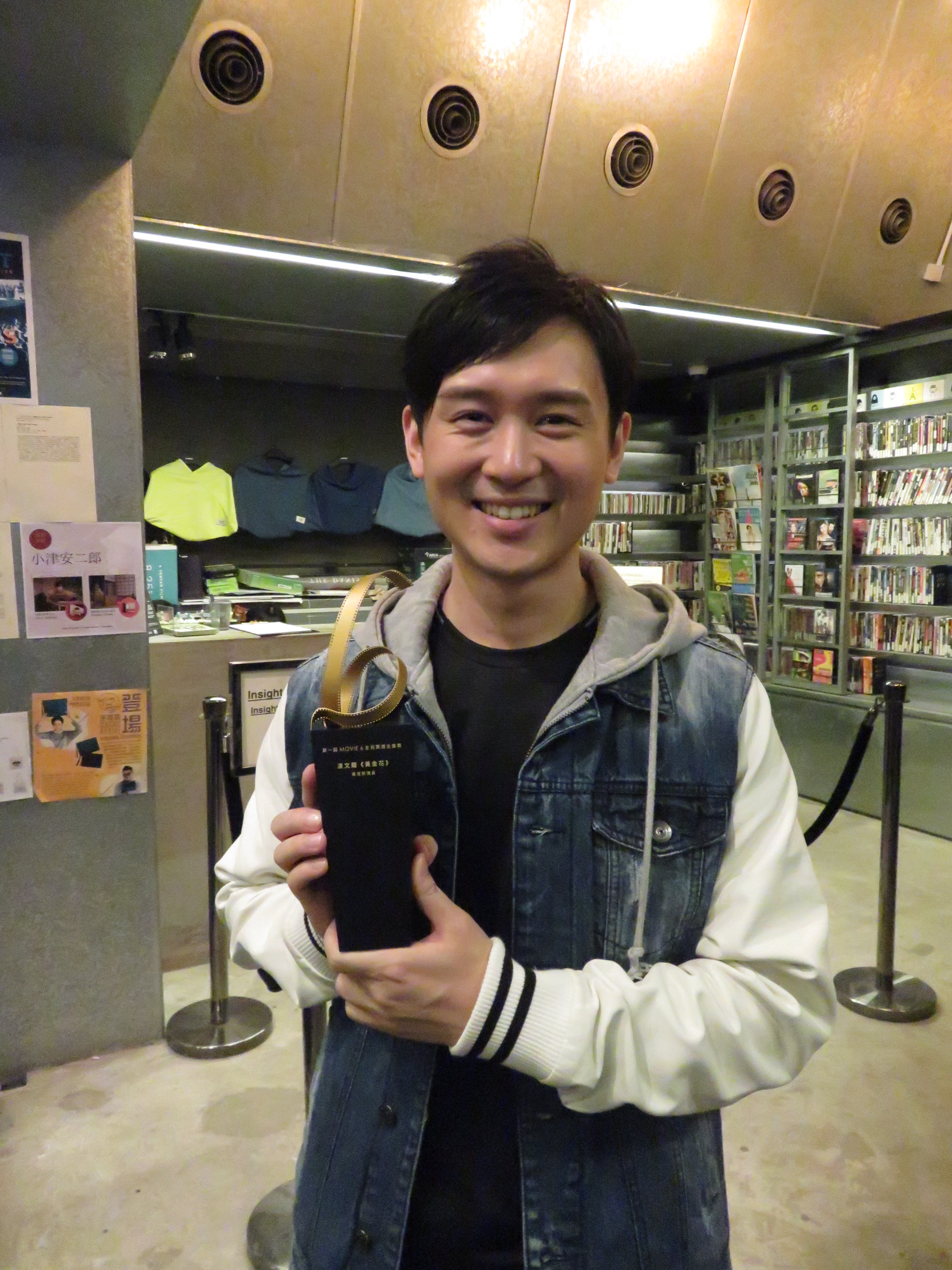
- Ling in April 2018
- Born: Ling Man-lung; 1986 or 1987 (age 39–40); Hong Kong
- Education: Hong Kong Academy for Performing Arts (BFA)
- Occupation: Actor
- Years active: 2018–present

Ling Man-lung (Chinese: 凌文龍; born 1986/1987) is a Hong Kong actor best known for his roles in the drama film Tomorrow Is Another Day (2017) and ViuTV comedy series In Geek We Trust (2022), which earned him Best New Performer in the 37th Hong Kong Film Awards and a nomination for Rising Star of the Year in the 4th Asia Contents Awards respectively.

== Biography ==
Ling was born on 1986 or 1987. He grew up in public housing estates and originally intended to learn dancing in secondary school. However, after participating in a drama performance at school, he became interested in acting. He attended the Hong Kong Academy for Performing Arts and graduated with a Bachelor of Fine Arts in 2008. After graduation, he joined the Hong Kong Repertory Theatre and worked as a full-time actor. He received a nomination for Best Actor with his performance in the play The Sin Family in the 25th Hong Kong Drama Awards. However, due to the instability of income, Ling later turned to freelance and worked as a waiter and dishwasher in a cha chaan teng to cover his expenses. He also taught performing arts in theatrical companies at the recommendation of director Chan Suk-yi.

In 2018, Ling received his onscreen debut role in the featured film Tomorrow Is Another Day. He played the autistic and mentally-handicapped son of Teresa Mo's character and his performance received widespread acclaim. He won Best New Performer and received a nomination for Best Actor in the 37th Hong Kong Film Awards. In 2019, Ling performed in the stage play The Beauty Queen of Leenane alongside Deanie Ip, Poon Chan Leung and Louisa So, and received a nomination for Best Supporting Actor in the 29th Hong Kong Drama Awards. From 2019 to 2020, he also featured in the crime thriller films A Witness Out of the Blue, Missing and Shock Wave 2.

Ling landed his first major television role in the 2021 ViuTV comedy series In Geek We Trust. His performance garnered him public renown, and he received a nomination for Rising Star of the Year in the 4th Asia Contents Awards. In 2023, Ling co-led the horror film One Night At School with MC and Eric Kot.

== Filmography ==
=== Film ===
Year	Title	Role	Notes/Ref.
2017	Tomorrow Is Another Day	Wong Hiu Kwong (黃曉光)	
2019	I Love You, You're Perfect, Now Change!	Chi Keung (志強)	
2019	A Witness Out of the Blue	Redhead	
2019	Missing	Mak Chi Ching (麥子清)	
2020	Shock Wave 2	Siu-hak (小克)	
2022	Let It Ghost	Brother Lark (Lark哥)	
2023	Shadows	Lau Po Keung (劉寶強)	
2023	One Night At School	Kan (阿簡)	
2024	Table for Six 2	Beanpole (高佬)	

=== Television ===
Year	Title	Role	Notes/Ref.
2020	The Gutter	Ryan	Guest role
2022	In Geek We Trust	Shun (阿信)	Main role
2022	#lovesignal	Wai (阿偉)	Cameo
2024	See Her Again	Mak Chi Hung	Main role

== Awards and nominations ==
Year	Award	Category	Work	Result	Ref.
2016	25th Hong Kong Drama Awards	Best Actor	The Sin Family	Nominated	
2018	12th Asian Film Awards	Best Newcomer	Tomorrow Is Another Day	Nominated	
2018	37th Hong Kong Film Awards	Best Actor	Tomorrow Is Another Day	Nominated	
2018	37th Hong Kong Film Awards	Best New Performer	Tomorrow Is Another Day	Won	
2020	29th Hong Kong Drama Awards	Best Supporting Actor	The Beauty Queen of Leenane	Nominated	
2022	4th Asia Contents Awards	Rising Star of the Year	In Geek We Trust	Nominated	
