= Kearen Pang =

Actress, director and writer from Hong Kong

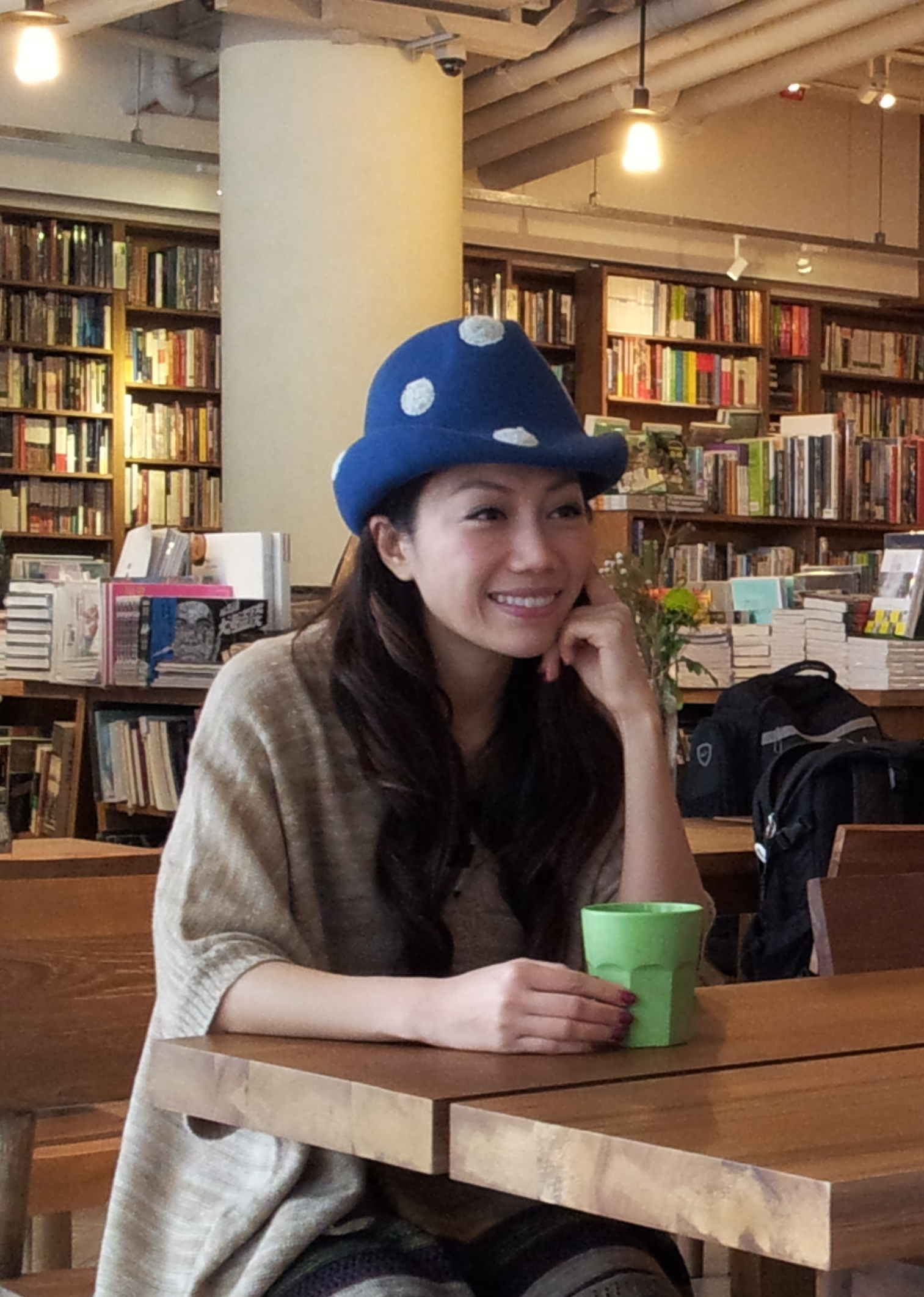
- Born: Hong Kong Ancestral hometown: Panyu district, Guangzhou city, Guangdong province
- Occupations: Actress, director, writer
- Children: 1
- Website: www.kearenpang.com

Kearen Pang is a Hong Kong cross-media creator who has written, directed and acted in theatrical productions and films. She graduated from the Hong Kong Academy for Performing Arts, and joined the Chung Ying Theater Company in 1998 as a full-time actor. She also participated in the theater in different positions, including stage director, musical, choreographer and producer. She left Chung Ying in 2003. In 2004 she studied in Paris Studio Magenia for mime and physical theater. Her first film script was with Pang Ho-Cheung, co-director of the Berlin International Film Festival Silver Bear Award film Isabella (2006). In 2005 she founded Kearen Pang Productions. She was awarded the Best Actress (Comedy/Farce) at the Hong Kong Drama Awards. In 2010, Sylvia – an American drama was produced by Kearen Pang Production. Kearen was the producer and main actress of the play – Sylvia. This production was awarded as the 10 Most Popular Production of the Year in 2010, in the Hong Kong Drama Award. "Sylvia" was then rerun in June 2011. Kearen was elected by CNNgo.com as one of "The Hong Kong Hot List: 20 People to Watch", her drama play and script was described as "full of subtle drama and stealthy sentimentality that creeps into audiences hearts". In 2011, Kearen was elected by RTHK and Hong Kong Federation of Drama Societies as "The Most Impressive Actress" in HK theatre in past 20 years.

== Filmography ==
=== Films ===
- 2006 Isabella - Writer
- 2012 Vulgaria - Tea lady
- 2018 29+1 - director and writer
- 2019 Lion Rock
- 2022 Mama's Affair - director and writer

=== Television shows ===
Year	Title	Network	Role	Notes
2020	King Maker III	ViuTV	Mentor	
