= Kris Wu discography =

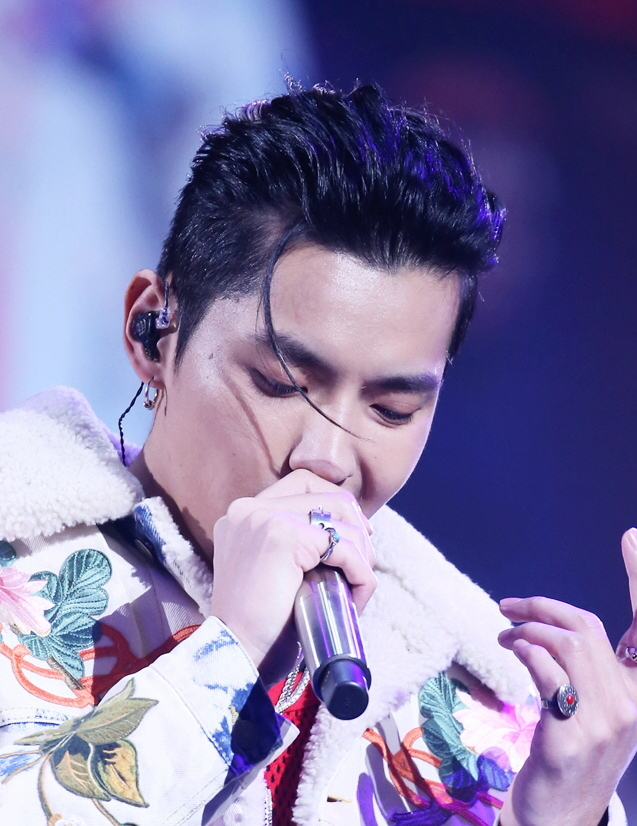
- Kris Wu performing in 2017
- Studio albums: 1
- EPs: 1
- Singles: 23

Canadian rapper Kris Wu has released one studio album, one extended play and twenty-two singles.

== Studio albums ==
List of albums, with selected chart positions
Title	Album details	Peaks		Sales
Title	Album details	AUS Dig.	US	Sales
Antares	Released: November 2, 2018; Label: Ace Unit Culture, Interscope, Universal Music China, Go East; Formats: Digital download, streaming	25	100	CHN: 607,052; US: 10,000

== Extended plays ==
List of extended plays
Title	EP details
Testing	Released: April 22, 2020; Label: Ace Unit Culture, Interscope, Universal Music China, Go East; Formats: Digital download, streaming

== Singles ==
Title	Year	Peak chart positions		Album
Title	Year	US	US R&B/ HH	Album
"Say Yes" (with Jessica and Krystal)	2014	—	—	Make Your Move OST
"Time Boils The Rain" (时间煮雨)	2014	—	—	Tiny Times 3 OST
"There is a Place" (有一个地方)	2014	—	—	Somewhere Only We Know OST
"Bad Girl"	2015	—	—	Non-album single
"Greenhouse Girl" (花房姑娘)	2015	—	—	Mr. Six OST
"From Now On" (从此以后)	2016	—	—	Sweet Sixteen OST
"July"	2016	—	—	Non-album single
"Sword like a Dream" (刀剑如梦)	2016	—	—	World of Sword OST
"Good Kid" (乖乖) (with Tan Jing)	2016	—	—	Journey to the West: Conquering the Demons 2 OST
"Juice"	2017	—	—	XXX: Return of Xander Cage OST
"6"	2017	—	—	Non-album singles
"I Choose the Road" (我选择的路)	2017	—	—	Non-album singles
"Deserve" (featuring Travis Scott)	2017	— (Note: "Deserve" did not enter the Billboard Hot 100, but peaked at number four on the Bubbling Under Hot 100 Singles chart.)	44	Antares
"Miss You" (想你) (featuring Zhao Liying)	2017	—	—	Non-album singles
"B.M."	2017	—	—	Non-album singles
"18" (with Rich Brian, Joji, Trippie Redd and Baauer)	2018	—	—	Non-album singles
"Hold Me Down"	2018	—	—	Antares
"Like That"	2018	73	37	Antares
"Freedom" (featuring Jhené Aiko)	2018	—	—	Antares
"Big Bowl, Thick Noodle" (大碗宽面)	2019	—	—	Non-album singles
"Eternal Love" (贰叁)	2019	—	—	Non-album singles
"Coffee" (咖啡) (with Lu Han)	2020	—	—	Non-album singles
"Soar" (翱翔) (with Regi, Wudu, Mac Ova Seas, Turbo & Ano)	2021	—	—	Summer special release and first single from 20XX Club
"—" denotes releases that did not chart or were not released in that region.

== Production credits ==
Year	Album	Song	Lyrics		Music	
Year	Album	Song	Credited	With	Credited	With
2014	Somewhere Only We Know OST	"There is a Place"	Yes	Song Bin-young	—N/a	—N/a
2015	—N/a	"Bad Girl"	Yes	—N/a	Yes	Song Bin-young and Brave Brothers
2015	Mr. Six OST	"Greenhouse Girl"	Yes	Cui Jian	—N/a	—N/a
2016	Sweet Sixteen OST	"From Now On"	Yes	Song Bin-young	—N/a	—N/a
2016	—N/a	"July"	Yes	Curtis, August Grant and Karl Rubin	—N/a	—N/a
2017	XXX: Return of Xander Cage (Original Motion Picture Soundtrack)	"Juice"	Yes	Rook Monroe, Maurice Simmonds, Darius Ginn Jr., Mario Jefferson	Yes	R!O & Kamo
2017	—N/a	"6"	Yes	—N/a	Yes	Kevin Shin
2019	ERYS	"Summertime in Paris"	Yes	Jaden Smith, Josiah Bell, Mateo Arias, Omarr Rambert, Tyler Cole, Willow Smith, Wu Yi Fan	—N/a	—N/a
