= Lemonade (Aespa album) =

- Digital cover

Studio album by Aespa
- Released: May 29, 2026
- Length: 30:19
- Languages: Korean; English
- Labels: SM; Kakao

Aespa chronology
Synk: Aexis Line (2025)	Lemonade (2026)	Kiss n Tell (2026)

Singles from Lemonade
- 1. "WDA (Whole Different Animal)" Released: May 11, 2026; 2. "Lemonade" Released: May 29, 2026

Lemonade is the second studio album by South Korean girl group Aespa. It was released by SM Entertainment on May 29, 2026, and contains ten tracks, including the singles "WDA (Whole Different Animal)" and "Lemonade". It charted at number one on the Circle Chart and number two on the Oricon Chart.

== Background and release ==
On April 20, 2026, SM Entertainment announced that Aespa would be releasing their second studio album titled Lemonade on May 29. A day later, the promotional schedule was released. On April 27, a trailer titled "Complaexity" was released. On May 4, it was announced that "WDA (Whole Different Animal)" would be pre-released on May 11. Four days later, the music video teaser for "WDA (Whole Different Animal)" was released. On May 10, the track listing was released. On May 11, "WDA (Whole Different Animal)" was released alongside its music video. On May 18, a trailer titled "Make It Lemonade" was released, followed by the highlight medley on May 25. On May 28, the music video teaser for "Lemonade" was released. The album was released alongside the music video for "Lemonade" on May 29.

== Composition ==
Lemonade contains 11 tracks. The first track and lead single, "WDA (Whole Different Animal)", features G-Dragon and is a hip-hop-based dance song characterized by "synth bass and heavy hook" with lyrics about "capturing the growth of Aespa". The second and same-name track, "Lemonade", is an EDM song characterized by "synth bass rhythm" with lyrics conveying "a positive message of turning any trial and hardship into opportunity" and inspired by the Western proverb "If life gives you lemons, make lemonade". The third track, "Shakin", is a dance song featuring "synth bass and a hook melody" with lyrics about "shaking up the other person's world". The fourth track, "Can't Help Myself", is a rock song with lyrics conveying "a free message of living authentically even if everyone dislikes me".

The fifth track, "Camouflage", is a hyperpop song with lyrics "expressing the act of living in a different persona while concealing my true feelings so as not to be swayed by anything akin to camouflaging". The sixth track, "Bite", is a dance song with lyrics about "biting if the line is crossed". The seventh track, "Switchblade", features Ty Dolla Sign and is an EDM song with lyrics about "the flexibility and strength that change dynamically depending on the situation". The eighth track, "Roll", is a song with lyrics that "expresses emotions toward a parted lover". The ninth track, "My Plan", is an R&B song with lyrics featuring a "witty story about winning over someone". The tenth track, "'Til We Die", is a pop rock song with lyrics containing "a sincere message of staying with those who have always supported me until the end". The eleventh track is an alternate version of "Lemonade" featuring Becky G.

== Critical reception ==
Professional ratings
Review scores
Source	Rating
AllMusic	4/5 stars
IZM	2/5 stars
laut.de	3/5 stars
NME	3.5/5 stars

Im Dong-yeop of IZM gave the album two out of five stars, writing that "continuity does not guarantee permanence", describing Lemonade as a sonically "solid" but uneven album that emphasized Aespa's established "metallic" sound over a cohesive musical direction. The critic added that the group's polished concepts and music videos did not "guarantee musical completeness", and argued that Aespa needed artistic renewal beyond its existing formula. Mika Chen of NME gave the album 3.5 out of five stars, writing that "Lemonade isn't without its sour notes" and that "the album starts to crumble under the pressure". Chen concluded that "when Lemonade works, it does so with the kind of self-assurance that reminds you why Aespa became such superstars in the first place", but added that "the album's stumbles constantly leave you wondering if they are truly adding to their impressive legacy - or just coasting on it".

== Track listing ==
Lemonade track listing
No.	Title	Lyrics	Music	Arrangement	Length
1.	"WDA (Whole Different Animal)" (featuring G-Dragon)	Jvde (Galactika); G-Dragon	Dwayne Abernathy Jr.; Ryan S. Jhun; Varick "Smitty" Smith; G-Dragon	Dem Jointz; Ryan S. Jhun	2:54
2.	"Lemonade"	Ellie Suh (153/Joombas)	Lewis Jankel; Jordan Shaw; Taylor Upsahl; Cyrus Villanueva	Shift K3Y	3:07
3.	"Shakin'"	Hyun Ji-won	Jonatan Gusmark; Ludvig Evers; Eva Parmakova; Bobii Lewis	Moonshine	2:42
4.	"Can't Help Myself"	Yoon (153/Joombas)	Markus Videsäter; Grace Baer; David Straaf	Markus Videsäter; Grace Baer; David Straaf	3:01
5.	"Camouflage"	Joowon	Theo Drose; Gustav Parling; Matilda Winberg; Charlotte Boyle	Act Social	3:07
6.	"Bite"	Joowon; Zaya (153/Joombas)	Stian Nyhammer Olsen; Julia Bognar Finnseter; Dana; Awrii (The Hub)	Stian Nyhammer Olsen	3:12
7.	"Switchblade" (featuring Ty Dolla Sign)	Danke; Joowon; Tyrone Griffin, Jr.; Ant Clemons	Evan Blair; Megan Bülow; David Charles Fischer; Sasha Alex Sloan; Tyrone Griffin, Jr.; Ant Clemons	Evan Blair	3:02
8.	"Roll"	Alma Goodman; Alida Garpestad Peck; Yorkie	Cook Classics; Alma Goodman; Alida Garpestad Peck	Cook Classics	2:39
9.	"My Plan"	Jvde (Galactika)	Simon Petrén; Ikki	Simon Petrén	3:12
10.	"'Til We Die"	Yoon (153/Joombas); Kelbyul (153/Joombas)	Alex Sacco; Alma Goodman; Parker James	Alex Sacco	3:23
Total length:					30:19

Lemonade digital edition track listing
No.	Title	Lyrics	Music	Arrangement	Length
11.	"Lemonade" (featuring Becky G)	Ellie Suh (153/Joombas); Sarah Schell; Kirsten Alyssa Spencer	Lewis Jankel; Jordan Shaw; Taylor Upsahl; Cyrus Villanueva; Sarah Schell; Kirsten Alyssa Spencer	Shift K3Y	3:07
Total length:					33:26

== Credits and personnel ==
Credits adapted from the album's liner notes in standard edition, exclude in digital edition.

Studio

- SM Yellow Tail Studio – recording (track 1, 8, 10), digital editing, engineered for mix (track 1)
- SM Wavelet Studio – recording (track 1–5, 8), digital editing (track 2, 4)
- SM Aube Studio – recording (track 1–3, 5–6, 8), digital editing (track 3, 5–6, 8), engineered for mix (track 8)
- Vibe Music Studio 606 – recording (track 1, 3)
- SM Azure Studio – recording (track 4, 7, 9), digital editing (track 7, 9)
- 1956 Recording Studio HQ – recording (track 7)
- SM Droplet Studio – recording, digital editing (track 10)
- SM Blue Cup Studio – digital editing (track 1), mixing (track 1, 7–8)
- 77F Studio – digital editing (track 8)
- SM Blue Ocean Studio – mixing (track 2–3)
- SM Big Shot Studio – mixing (track 4)
- SM Concert Hall Studio – mixing (track 5, 10)
- SM Starlight Studio – mixing (track 6, 9)
- 821 Sound – mastering (all tracks)

Personnel

- SM Entertainment – executive producer
- Aespa – vocals, background vocals (all tracks)
- G-Dragon – vocals, lyrics, composition, background vocals (track 1)
- Ty Dolla Sign – vocals, lyrics, composition, background vocals (track 7)
- Jvde (Galactika) – lyrics (track 1, 9), vocal directing (track 9)
- Dwayne Abernathy Jr. a.k.a. Dem Jointz – producer, composition, arrangement, background vocals (track 1)
- Ryan S. Jhun – producer, composition, arrangement (track 1)
- Varick "Smitty" Smith – composition (track 1)
- Ellie Suh (153/Joombas) – lyrics (track 2)
- Lewis Jankel a.k.a. Shift K3Y – producer, composition, arrangement (track 2)
- Jordan Shaw – composition (track 2)
- Taylor Upsahl – composition (track 2)
- Cyrus Villanueva – composition (track 2)
- Hyun Ji-won – lyrics (track 3)
- Jonatan Gusmark (Moonshine) – producer, composition, arrangement (track 3)
- Ludvig Evers (Moonshine) – producer, composition, arrangement (track 3)
- Eva Parmakova – composition, background vocals (track 3)
- Bobii Lewis – composition (track 3)
- Yoon (153/Joombas) – lyrics (track 4, 10)
- Markus Videsäter – producer, composition, arrangement (track 4)
- Grace Baer – composition, arrangement (track 4)
- David Straaf – producer, composition, arrangement (track 4)
- Joowon – lyrics (track 5–7), vocal directing (track 1–2, 4–5, 7)
- Theo Drose (Act Social) – producer, composition, arrangement (track 5)
- Gustav Parling (Act Social) – producer, composition, arrangement (track 5)
- Matilda Winberg – composition (track 5)
- Charlotte Boyle – composition (track 5)
- Zaya (153/Joombas) – lyrics (track 6)
- Stian Nyhammer Olsen – producer, composition, arrangement (track 6)
- Julia Bognar Finnseter – composition, background vocals (track 6)
- Dana – composition, background vocals (track 6)
- Awrii (The Hub) – composition, background vocals (track 6)
- Danke – lyrics (track 7)
- Ant Clemons – lyrics, composition (track 7)
- Evan Blair – producer, composition, arrangement (track 7)
- Megan Bülow – composition, background vocals (track 7)
- David Charles Fischer – composition, background vocals (track 7)
- Sasha Alex Sloan – composition, background vocals (track 7)
- Alma Goodman – lyrics (track 8), composition (track 8, 10), background vocals (track 10)
- Alida Garpestad Peck – lyrics, composition (track 8)
- Yorkie – lyrics (track 8)
- Cook Classics – producer, composition, arrangement (track 8)
- Simon Petrén – producer, composition, arrangement (track 9)
- Ikki – composition (track 9)
- Kelbyul (153/Joombas) – lyrics (track 10)
- Alex Sacco – producer, composition, arrangement (track 10)
- Parker James – composition (track 10)
- Don Mills – vocal directing (track 1)
- Hyun – vocal directing (track 3)
- Jsong – vocal directing (track 6)
- Sophia Pae a.k.a. Sophiya – vocal directing (track 8)
- Sam Carter – vocal directing (track 10)
- Emily Yeonseo Kim – background vocals (track 7, 9–10)
- Kim Dong-min – guitar (track 4)
- Koo Bon-am – bass (track 4)
- Noh Min-ji – recording (track 1, 8, 10), digital editing, engineered for mix (track 1)
- Kang Eun-ji – recording (track 1–5, 8), digital editing (track 2, 4)
- Kim Hyo-joon – recording (track 1–3, 5–6, 8), digital editing (track 3, 5–6, 8), engineered for mix (track 8)
- Jeong Mo-yeon – recording (track 1, 3)
- Kim Jae-yeon – recording (track 4, 7, 9), digital editing (track 7, 9)
- Rafael Fai Bautista – recording (track 7)
- Kim Joo-hyun – recording, digital editing (track 10)
- Jung Eui-seok – digital editing (track 1), mixing (track 1, 7–8)
- Woo Min-jeong – digital editing (track 8)
- Kim Cheol-sun – mixing (track 2–3)
- Lee Min-kyu – mixing (track 4)
- Nam Koong-jin – mixing (track 5, 10)
- Jeong Yoo-ra – mixing (track 6, 9)
- Kwon Nam-woo – mastering (all tracks)

== Charts ==
=== Weekly charts ===
Weekly chart performance for Lemonade
Chart (2026)	Peak position
Australian Albums (ARIA)	24
Austrian Albums (Ö3 Austria)	35
Belgian Albums (Ultratop Flanders)	19
Belgian Albums (Ultratop Wallonia)	11
Croatian International Albums (HDU)	4
French Albums (SNEP)	13
German Albums (Offizielle Top 100)	27
German Pop Albums (Offizielle Top 100)	9
Greek Albums (IFPI)	14
Hungarian Physical Albums (MAHASZ)	11
Japanese Albums (Oricon)	2
Japanese Combined Albums (Oricon)	2
Japanese Hot Albums (Billboard Japan)	4
Lithuanian Albums (AGATA)	85
New Zealand Albums (RMNZ)	25
Polish Albums (ZPAV)	20
Portuguese Albums (AFP)	21
South Korean Albums (Circle)	1
Spanish Albums (Promusicae)	57
Swedish Physical Albums (Sverigetopplistan)	9
Swiss Albums (Schweizer Hitparade)	40
UK Album Downloads (Official Charts)	15
US Billboard 200	9
US World Albums (Billboard)	1

=== Monthly charts ===
Monthly chart performance for Lemonade
Chart (2026)	Peak position
Japanese Albums (Oricon)	9
South Korean Albums (Circle)	2

== Certifications ==
Certifications for Lemonade
Region	Certification	Certified units/sales
South Korea (KMCA)	3× Platinum	750,000^{^}
^{^} Shipments figures based on certification alone.

== Release history ==
Release history for Lemonade
Region	Date	Format	Label
South Korea	May 29, 2026	CD	SM; Kakao
Various	May 29, 2026	Digital download; streaming	SM; Kakao
