= WDA (Whole Different Animal) =

Single by Aespa featuring G-Dragon

from the album Lemonade
- Language: Korean
- Released: May 11, 2026
- Studio: SM Yellow Tail (Seoul); SM Wavelet (Seoul); SM Aube (Seoul); Vibe Music Studio 606 (Seoul)
- Genre: Hip-hop; dance
- Length: 2:54
- Label: SM; Kakao
- Composers: Dem Jointz; Ryan S. Jhun; Varick "Smitty" Smith; G-Dragon
- Lyricists: Jvde (Galactika); G-Dragon

Aespa singles chronology
"Rich Man" (2025)	"WDA (Whole Different Animal)" (2026)	"Lemonade" (2026)

G-Dragon singles chronology
"Too Bad" (2025)	"WDA (Whole Different Animal)" (2026)

Music video
- "WDA (Whole Different Animal)" on YouTube

"WDA (Whole Different Animal)" is a song recorded by South Korean girl group Aespa, featuring South Korean rapper and singer-songwriter G-Dragon, for their second studio album Lemonade. It was released by SM Entertainment on May 11, 2026, as the lead single from the album. It charted at number 12 on the Circle Chart.

== Background and release ==
On April 20, 2026, SM Entertainment announced that Aespa would be releasing their second studio album titled Lemonade on May 29. On May 4, it was announced that "WDA (Whole Different Animal)" would be pre-released on May 11. On May 8, the music video teaser was released. The song was released alongside its music video on May 11.

== Composition ==
"WDA (Whole Different Animal)" was written by Jvde of Galactika and G-Dragon, composed by Dem Jointz, Ryan S. Jhun, Varick "Smitty" Smith, and G-Dragon, and arranged by Dem Jointz and Ryan S. Jhun. It is a hip-hop-based dance song characterized by "synth bass and heavy hook" with lyrics about "capturing the growth of Aespa".

== Music video ==
The music video portrays a world where the boundary between reality and the digital realm has become increasingly blurred, making it impossible to prove what is "real." In this world, beings that resemble Aespa but are not them appear, creating confusion and conflict. Amid this chaos, Aespa ultimately break through the fracture ("Complaexity") and reaffirm their own existence.

== Promotion ==
Prior to the release of "WDA (Whole Different Animal)", on May 11, 2026, Aespa held a live event called "WDA Countdown Live" on YouTube and TikTok, aimed at introducing the song. They subsequently performed the song at four music programs: Mnet's M Countdown on May 14, KBS's Music Bank on May 15, MBC's Show! Music Core on May 16, and SBS's Inkigayo on May 17.

== Critical reception ==
Professional ratings
Review scores
Source	Rating
IZM	2/5 stars

Son Min-hyun of IZM gave the song two out of five stars, writing that the song's "internal structure" was "loose" despite the significance of G-Dragon's collaboration. He argued that G-Dragon's contribution was limited to repetition and a brief transition, lacking the distinctive presence that had strengthened his previous featured appearances. Son further criticized the track's sharp electronic effects and "metallic" sound for reducing its identity to a promotional slogan, while finding its closing humming section indistinct.

== Accolades ==
Music program awards for "WDA (Whole Different Animal)"
Program	Date	Ref.
Music Bank	June 5, 2026	

== Credits and personnel ==
Credits adapted from the album's liner notes.

Studio

- SM Yellow Tail Studio – recording, digital editing, engineered for mix
- SM Wavelet Studio – recording
- SM Aube Studio – recording
- Vibe Music Studio 606 – recording
- SM Blue Cup Studio – digital editing, mixing
- 821 Sound – mastering

Personnel

- SM Entertainment – executive producer
- Aespa – vocals, background vocals
- G-Dragon – vocals, lyrics, composition, background vocals
- Jvde (Galactika) – lyrics
- Dwayne Abernathy Jr. a.k.a. Dem Jointz – composition, arrangement, background vocals
- Ryan S. Jhun – composition, arrangement
- Varick "Smitty" Smith – composition
- Don Mills – vocal directing
- Joowon – vocal directing
- Noh Min-ji – recording, digital editing, engineered for mix
- Kang Eun-ji – recording
- Kim Hyo-joon – recording
- Jeong Mo-yeon – recording
- Jung Eui-seok – digital editing, mixing
- Kwon Nam-woo – mastering

== Charts ==
=== Weekly charts ===
Weekly chart performance for "WDA (Whole Different Animal)"
Chart (2026)	Peak position
Global 200 (Billboard)	185
Hong Kong (Billboard)	15
Japan Hot 100 (Billboard)	56
New Zealand Hot Singles (RMNZ)	15
Singapore (RIAS)	27
South Korea (Circle)	12
Taiwan (Billboard)	4
Vietnam Hot 100 (Billboard)	59

=== Monthly charts ===
Monthly chart performance for "WDA (Whole Different Animal)"
Chart (2026)	Position
South Korea (Circle)	16

== Release history ==
Release history for "WDA (Whole Different Animal)"
Region	Date	Format	Label
Various	May 11, 2026	Digital download; streaming	SM; Kakao
