= Lushan (disambiguation) =

Lushan or Lu Shan is a famed mountain and World Heritage Site in Jiangxi, China.

- Lushan City (庐山市), at the foot of the mountain
- Lianxi District, formerly Lushan District, at the foot of the mountain

Lushan or Lu Shan may also refer to:

- Lushan County, Henan (鲁山县)
- Lushan County, Sichuan (芦山县)
- Yiwulü Mountain, also Lüshan (闾山), in Beizhen, Liaoning

== See also ==
- An Lushan
- Jiangxi Lushan F.C., a Chinese football club based in Ruichang, Jiangxi
- Lu Shan (actress) (born 1989), Chinese actress and model
