= Like That =

Like That may refer to:

== Songs ==
- "Like That" (Doja Cat song), 2020
- "Like That" (Kris Wu song), 2018
- "Like That" (Future, Metro Boomin and Kendrick Lamar song), 2024
- "Like That", a song by BabyMonster from BabyMons7er, 2024
- "Like That", a song by Bea Miller from Chapter Two: Red, 2017
- "Like That", a song by Black Eyed Peas from Monkey Business, 2005
- "Like That", a song by Chase & Status from Brand New Machine, 2013
- "Like That", a song by CLC from Black Dress, 2018
- "Like That", a song by Fleur East from Love, Sax and Flashbacks, 2015
- "Like That", a song by JoJo from The High Road, 2006
- "Like That", a song by Lil Durk from Love Songs 4 the Streets 2, 2019
- "Like That", a song by Now United, 2019
- "Like That", a song by Memphis Bleek from 534, 2005
- "Like That", a song by Moka Only from Airport 6, 2012
- "Like That", a song by Stand Atlantic from Pink Elephant, 2020
- "Like That", a song by Victoria Beckham from Victoria Beckham, 2001
- "Like That", a song by Webbie from Savage Life, 2005
- "Like That", a song by Yo Gotti from Untrapped, 2020

== See also ==
- "Like Dat", a song by Stat Quo, 2005
