= Ideal Mini School =

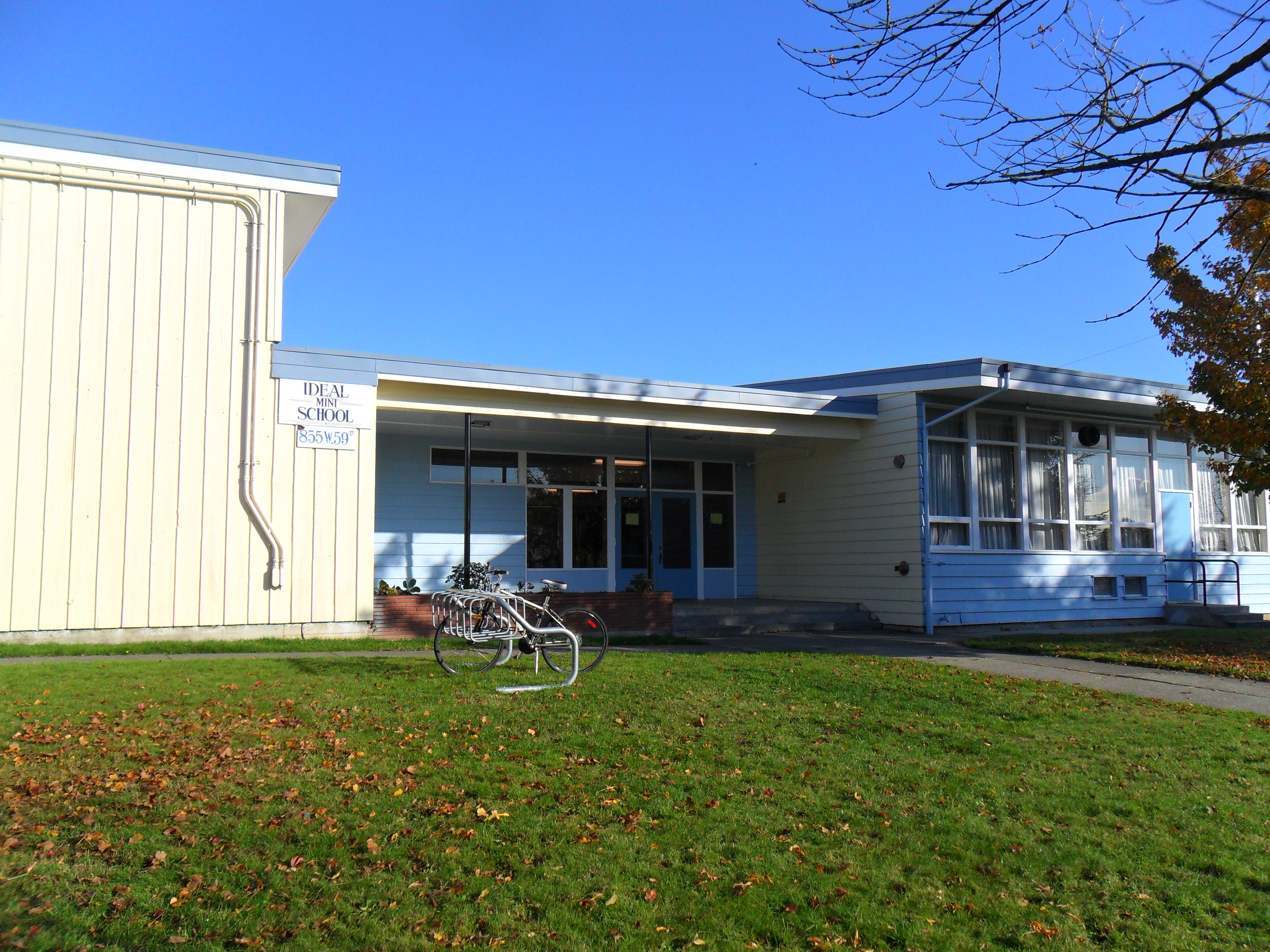

Location
- 855 West 59th Avenue; Vancouver, British Columbia, V6P 6H7; Canada; 49.217334°N 123.125518°W

Information
- School type: Secondary school (mini school)
- School board: School District 39 Vancouver
- Head Teacher: Patty Tseng
- Grades: 8–12
- Enrollment: 129 (2010)
- Language: English
- Area: Vancouver
- Website: www.idealminischool.ca www.vsb.bc.ca/sir-winston-churchill/ideal-mini-program

Ideal Mini School is a public secondary mini school in Vancouver, British Columbia. It is a complete grade 8–12 high school program. It is generally accepted as the "steward school" of Sir Winston Churchill Secondary, although it is run independently under the leadership of head teacher Patty Tseng. Ideal emphasizes community, social responsibility, collaboration, and leadership development.

An application is required to get into Ideal. You can download the form online and submit an hard copy to the Sir Winston Churchill Secondary office. Community service, grades, and extra-curricular activities are considered in the process. Interviews with candidates are conducted to further narrow the pool of applicants.

== Program ==
Other than in its small size, Ideal differs from Churchill Secondary in its enriched approach to learning. It offers an intimate and creative environment, and utilizes an informal teaching style where teachers are addressed by their first names and student-teacher trust is held in high esteem. Integration among grades, expression and leadership are promoted with regularly scheduled "school meetings". There are six classrooms in the school, which is currently attended by approximately 130 students from Grade 8 to 12.

Students at Ideal may join sports teams at Churchill Secondary, as well as clubs and select elective classes in Grades 11 and 12.

Each year, the entire school participates in a 3 day camp trip in October to Timberline Ranch. Ideal students taking Leadership 12 become camp leaders and help lead activities throughout the trip.

Every two years, Ideal's Grade 11 to 12 students travel abroad to experience cultures around the world. They choose between Japan, New York, Paris, or London.

Many other events happens throughout the year as well. Including a Halloween potluck and costume contest. During December, Ideal students participates in a Kris Kringle (otherwise known as Secret Santa) where students randomly draw names so each person buys one gift for an assigned recipient while keeping their identity secret until the exchange.

== History ==
Ideal School was established in 1972 by teacher Garry Nixon, a teacher at St. George's School. It was intended to be an independent, alternative high school. The Province reported that "[t]o be admitted, boys and girls must convince Nixon they sincerely want to learn and are willing to work harder than would be required in other schools", and that it would cost $60 a month in fees. Nixon published a job posting in The Vancouver Sun, promising prospective teachers "freedom, fascination and abject poverty". Six teachers comprised the original staff, chosen from a pool of over 60 applicants, and with much lower salaries than what could be expected at a public school. Ideal School was originally housed in the Vancouver Fancy Sausage Factory, on 16th Avenue and Heather Street. The blood gutters had to be cleaned out before the staff and students could move in. Faced with financial difficulties, in 1974 the school approached the Vancouver School Board for economic support.

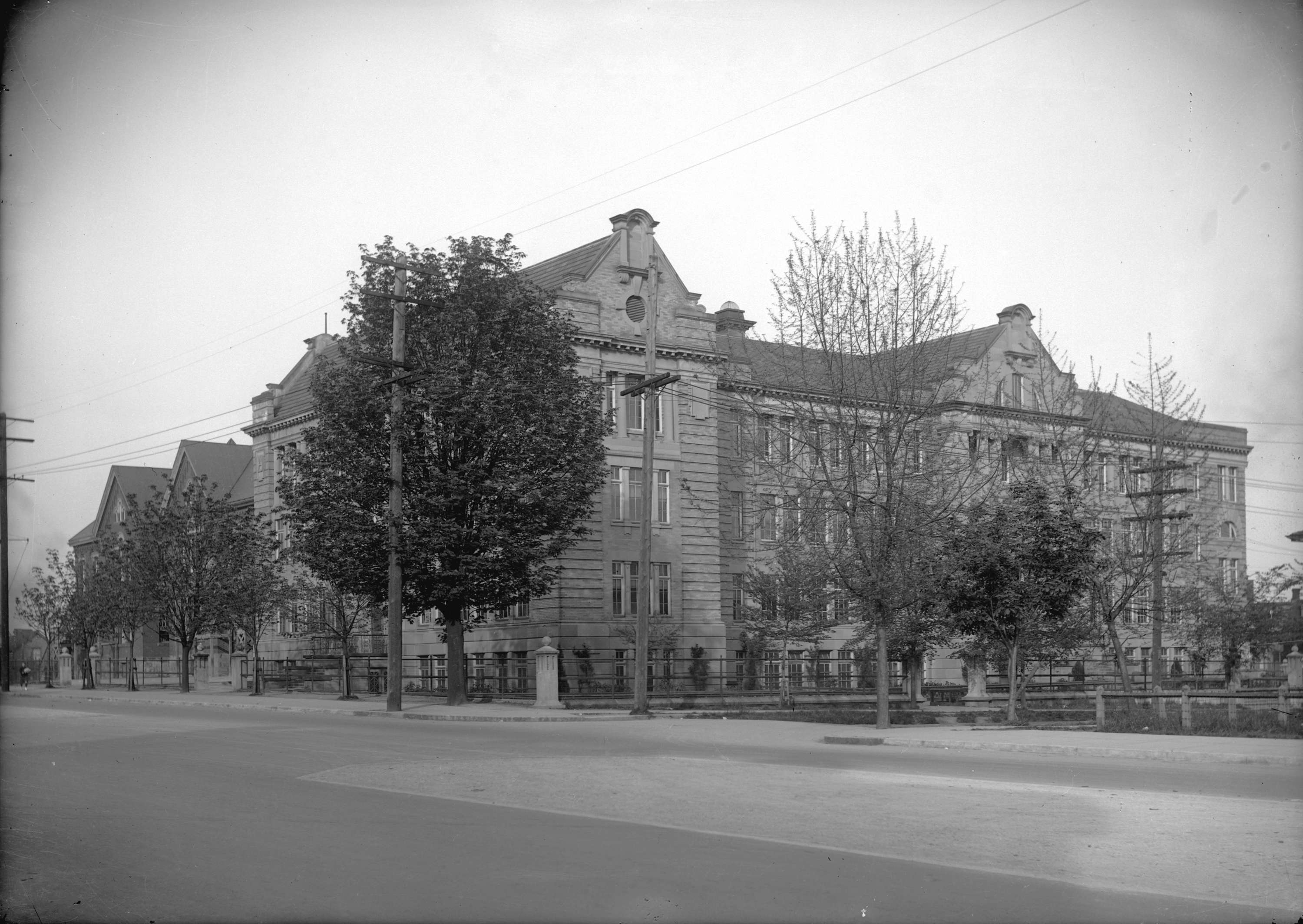
Sir William Dawson School circa 1920

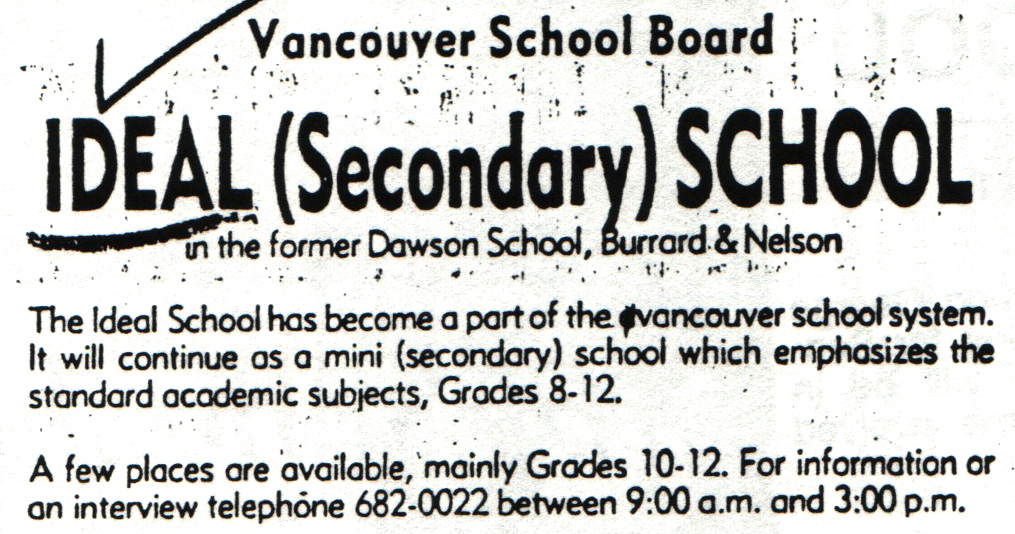
1974 newspaper ad

Once absorbed by the Vancouver School Board, the tuition was removed and teacher salaries were increased. It was temporarily relocated to Sir William Dawson School on Helmcken Street (which closed in 1972, and was used by Ideal and City School, another alternative program, from 1974 to 1977). It was placed under the administration of King George Secondary School, and prospered for two years with help from the school board, which advertised for it to maintain enrolment, reportedly spending approximately $1,700 between 1974 and 1977. In November 1975, a research report released by a member of the Board of School Trustees reported around 100 students and five teachers. It claimed that the students benefited from their experience at Ideal due to freedom to participate in school decisions, dedicated teachers, and low student–teacher ratio, while criticizing the building and the lack of facilities and equipment.

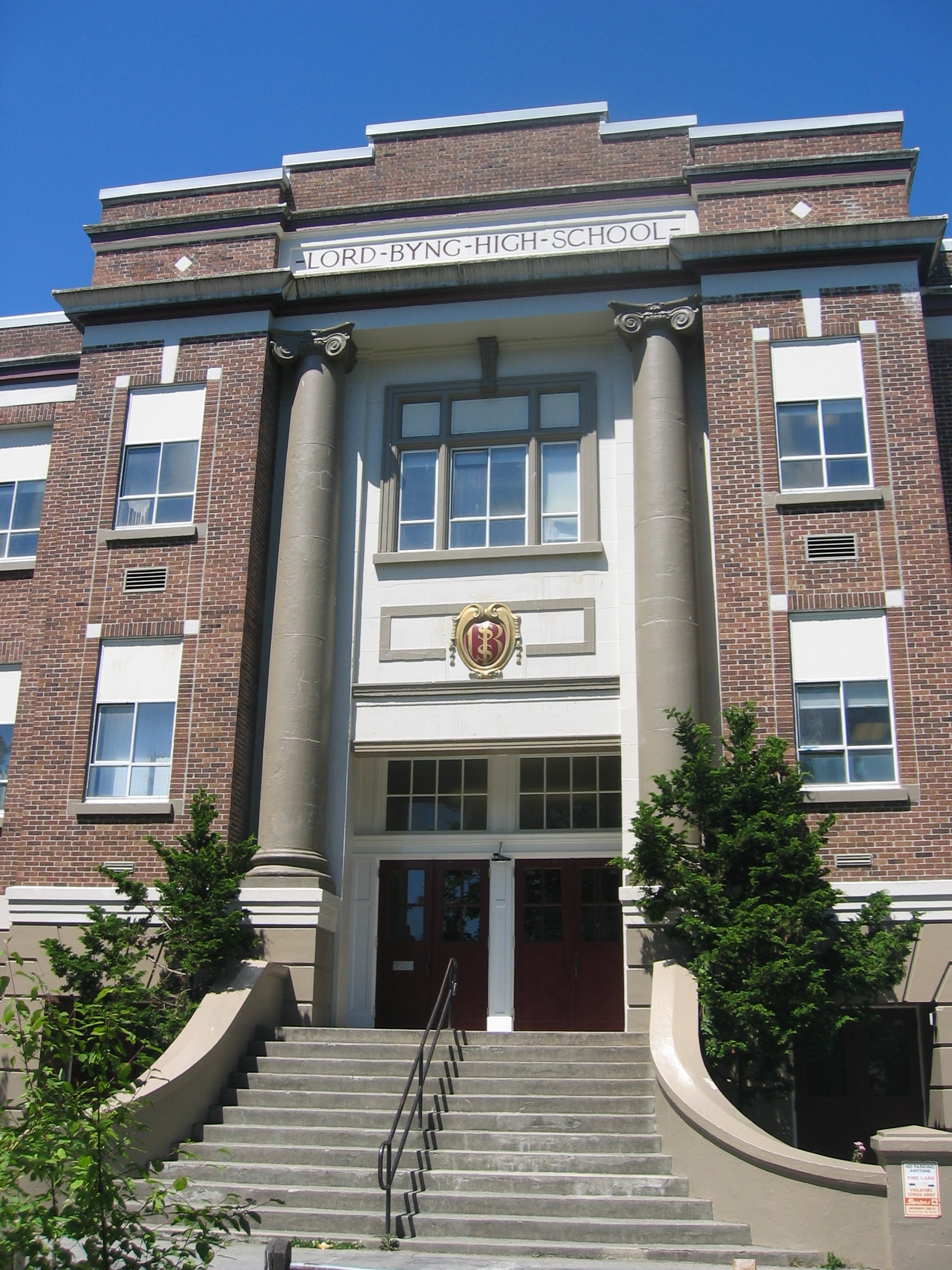
Lord Byng Secondary School

On April 21, 1976, the school board stated that Ideal was to be moved to Lord Byng Secondary School. A parent–student committee was formed to discuss the situation, which presented arguments against the move to the school board, claiming that its independence was necessary to maintain students' individuality and creativity. The committee succeeded in convincing the board to withdraw its decision. On October 4, 1976, a board official stated that the move to Lord Byng was being reconsidered, but the committee succeeded once more in convincing the board against the relocation. However, on December 6, 1976, the board announced their irreversible decision to perform the move before February 1, 1977, as the Dawson School building was considered too expensive to maintain. Ideal School was to occupy three classrooms at Byng, and students were told that they could either accept the move or be dispersed among Vancouver high schools. On January 4, 1977, Ideal students protested in front of the Vancouver School Board.

It was agreed that the school board would assess Ideal's situation at Lord Byng for six months, and if the accommodation was deemed inadequate, it would be relocated again. Lord Byng and Ideal did not co-exist well, and parents and students wrote complaint letters to the media.

Relocation to the former site of L'École Bilingue Elementary in Shannon Park was considered, but residents of the area disapproved of the presence of a secondary school. Eventually, Ideal was relocated to 855 West 59th Avenue.

In 1995, Ideal Mini School came in first in British Columbia provincial exam results for English 12 and second (the first being University Hill Secondary School) in English Literature 12.

Vancouver School Board budget cuts in 2010 threatened mini schools, including Ideal, resulting in student protests.

== Decision to Relocate the Ideal Mini School ==
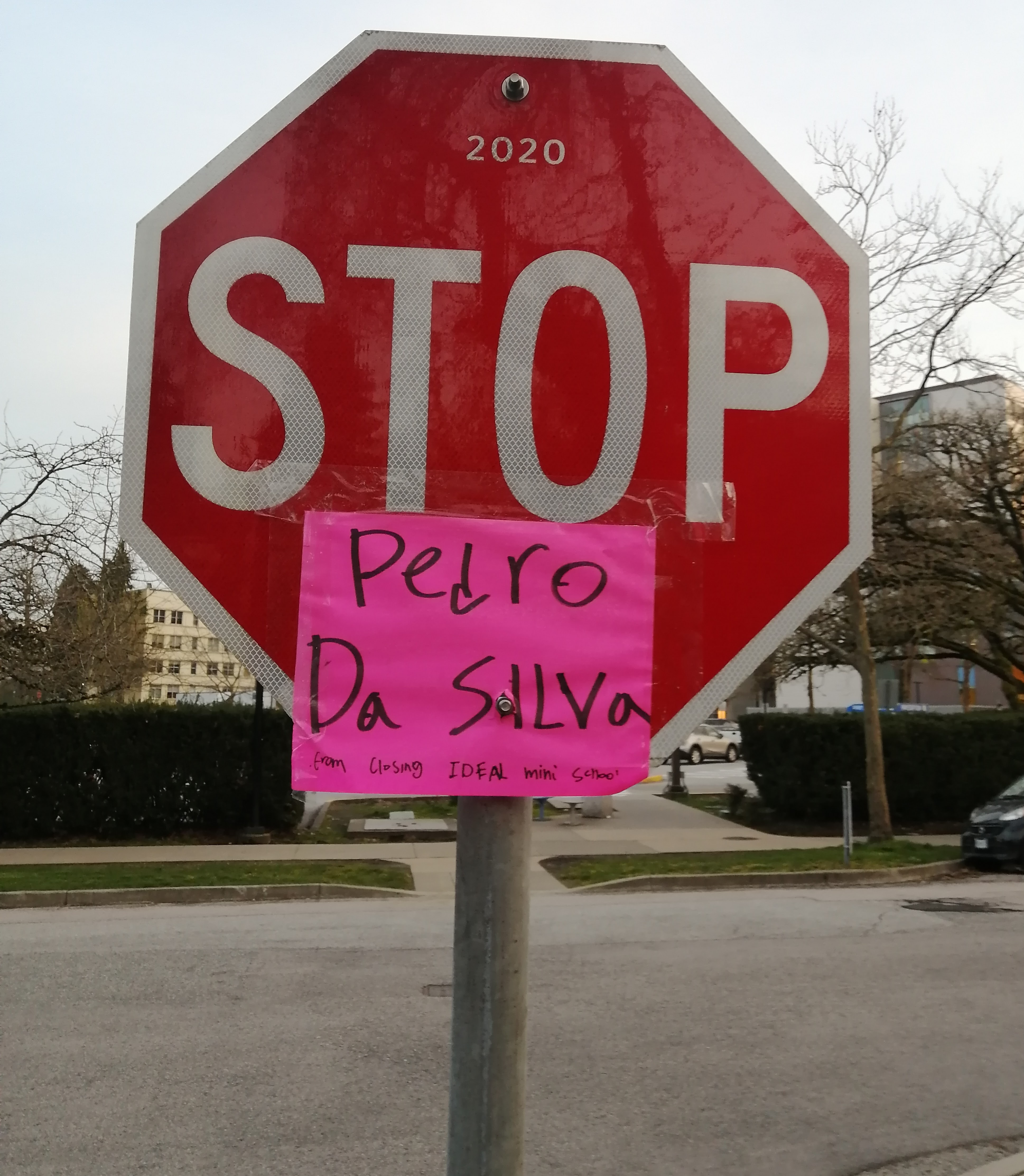
A Vancouver stop sign decorated in protest against the Ideal Mini School relocation and the VSB.

In April 2023, the Vancouver School Board (VSB) announced that the Ideal Mini School would be relocated to Sir Winston Churchill Secondary School in the fall of 2023, which is two blocks away from its original location next to Laurier Elementary School. According to current plans, Ideal Mini School students would remain in their current program and would not be integrated into general enrolment with other students at Sir Winston Churchill Secondary School. In a CBC radio interview, the Associate Superintendent of the VSB stated that the decision was made to let Laurier Elementary School repurpose the buildings to create additional space for kindergarten-aged students in the catchment area who otherwise had to attend different schools farther away from home. To date, critics of the decision include School Board Trustees Suzie Mah and Jennifer Reddy as well as Ideal Mini School students and their parents who felt that the VSB did not make adequate efforts to consult the Ideal Mini School and its students before announcing a decision.

== Notable alumni ==
- Michael Blake, saxophonist
- Chelsea Hobbs, actress
- Joshua Jackson, actor
- Jen Sookfong Lee, broadcaster and novelist
- Chris William Martin, actor
- Mark Jowett, co-founder of Nettwerk Music Group
