= Antares (Kris Wu album) =

Studio album by Kris Wu
- Released: November 2, 2018
- Length: 46:41
- Language: English; Mandarin
- Label: Ace Unit Culture Media; Interscope; Universal Music China; Go East
- Producer: Kris Wu; Beazy Tymes; Brian Lee; Bryan Nelson; Dun Deal; FKi 1st; P.Kaldone; Frank Dukes; Murda Beatz; Rex Kudo; Roofeeo; R!O & Kamo; Smitty; Track Bangas; WondaGurl

Singles from Antares
- 1. "Deserve" Released: October 12, 2017; 2. "Like That" Released: May 18, 2018; 3. "Freedom" Released: September 14, 2018

Antares (Chinese: 安塔爾) is the first studio album by Canadian rapper Kris Wu, released on November 2, 2018, through Ace Unit Culture Media. The album was preceded by the singles "Deserve" featuring Travis Scott, "Like That", and "Freedom" featuring Jhené Aiko. "Coupe" featuring Rich the Kid was released as an instant grat along with the album pre-order. The songs "Tough Pill" and "Hold Me Down" are the only songs on the album to be featured in both English and Mandarin versions.

== Background ==
Along with the announcement of the album on the Complex radio show Open Late hosted by Peter Rosenberg, Wu stated on the show that he named the album for the star Antares, which means "heart of the scorpion", and in Chinese translates to "heart of the dragon". Wu also set the release date for November 2.

== Chart manipulation accusation ==
Upon release in the United States, seven songs from Antares were in the top ten on the American iTunes Store, blocking songs like Ariana Grande's "Thank U, Next", which was released the following day. Wu was accused by Grande's manager Scooter Braun of using bots to boost his sales numbers. Braun later apologized via an Instagram post, stating after a conversation with Wu, that the irregulation in sales were most likely done through impatient Chinese fans using VPNs to access the album earlier. Antares ultimately debuted at number 100 on the Billboard 200, earning 8,000 album-equivalent units, 5,000 of which were pure sales.

== Track listing ==
Antares track listing
No.	Title	Writer(s)	Producer(s)	Length
1.	"Antares"	Wu Yifan; Ebony Oshunrinde; Kyle "KO" Owens; Adam Feeney; Akil "Fresh" King	WondaGurl; Frank Dukes^{[b]}	3:06
2.	"November Rain"	Wu; Brian Lee; Shane Lindstorm; Tavoris Hollins, Jr.	Lee; Murda Beatz	3:13
3.	"Coupe" (featuring Rich the Kid)	Wu; Dimitri Roger; Bryan "Composer" Nelson; King	Nelson	3:14
4.	"Tough Pill"	Wu; Louis Bell; Owens; Jahphet Landis; Maurice "Verse" Simmonds; King	Kris Wu; Bell; Roofeeo	3:32
5.	"We Alive"	Wu; Oshunrinde; Krystin Rook; Monroe Watkins; Feeney	WondaGurl; Frank Dukes^{[b]}	3:03
6.	"Selfish"	Wu; Nelson	Nelson	3:15
7.	"Tian Di" (天地)	Wu; Patrick Joseph; David Cunningham	Dun Deal P.Kaldone ^{[b]}	3:36
8.	"Freedom" (featuring Jhené Aiko)	Wu; Jhené Aiko Chilombo; Steven Bolden; T. Markous Roberts; Masamune Rex Kudo	FKi 1st; Rex Kudo^{[a]}	4:24
9.	"Explore"	Wu; Mario Jefferson; King; Simmonds; Krystin Rock; Monroe Watkins	Kris Wu; R!O & Kamo	2:59
10.	"Like That"	Wu; Jeffrey Smith; Vernon Smith; Roberts; Bell	FKi 1st; Track Bangas; Smitty^{[a]}	3:48
11.	"Hold Me Down"	Wu; Bell; Simmonds; Owens; King	Bell	2:59
12.	"Deserve" (featuring Travis Scott)	Wu; Jacques Webster; Owens; Bell; Simmonds; Cortese Shelton; Jawan Shelton; King; C. King	Kris Wu; Bell; Beazy Tymes	3:02
13.	"Tough Pill" (Chinese version)	Wu; Bell; Owens; Landis; Simmonds; King	Kris Wu; Bell; Roofeeo	3:32
14.	"Hold Me Down" (Chinese version)	Wu; Simmonds; Owens; King	Kris Wu; Bell	2:59
Total length:				46:41

Notes

- ^{^[a]} signifies a co-producer
- ^{^[b]} signifies an additional producer
- "Hold Me Down" is titled "Hold Me Down – English Version" on digital platforms.
- The Mandarin version of "Hold Me Down" is titled "Hold Me Down – Chinese Version" on digital platforms.

== Personnel ==
Performance

- Kris Wu – main vocals
- Rich the Kid – featured vocals (track 3)
- Jhené Aiko – featured vocals (track 8)
- Travis Scott – featured vocals (track 12)

Production

- Kris Wu – executive production, production (tracks 4, 9, 12–14)
- WondaGurl – production (track 1 and 5)
- Murda Beatz – production (track 2)
- Brian Lee – production (track 2)
- Bryan Nelson – production (tracks 3 and 6)
- Louis Bell – production (tracks 4, 11–14)
- Roofeeo – production (tracks 4 and 13
- Dun Deal – production (track 7)
- P.Kaldone – production (track 7)
- FKi 1st – production (tracks 8 and 10)
- R!O & Kamo – production (track 9)
- Track Bangas – production (track 10)
- Beazy Tymes – production (track 12)
- Frank Dukes – additional production (tracks 1 and 5)
- Rex Kudo – additional production (track 8)
- Smitty – co-production (track 10)

Technical

- Ray Charles Brown Jr. – engineering (tracks 7 and 10), recording (track 8)
- Claudio Cueni – mastering (track 8)
- FKi 1st – mixing (track 8)

== Charts ==
Chart performance for Antares
Chart (2018)	Peak position
Australian Digital Albums (ARIA)	25
French Digital Albums (SNEP)	121
US Billboard 200	100
