= Sir Winston Churchill Secondary School (Vancouver) =

Public secondary school in Vancouver, British Columbia, Cada

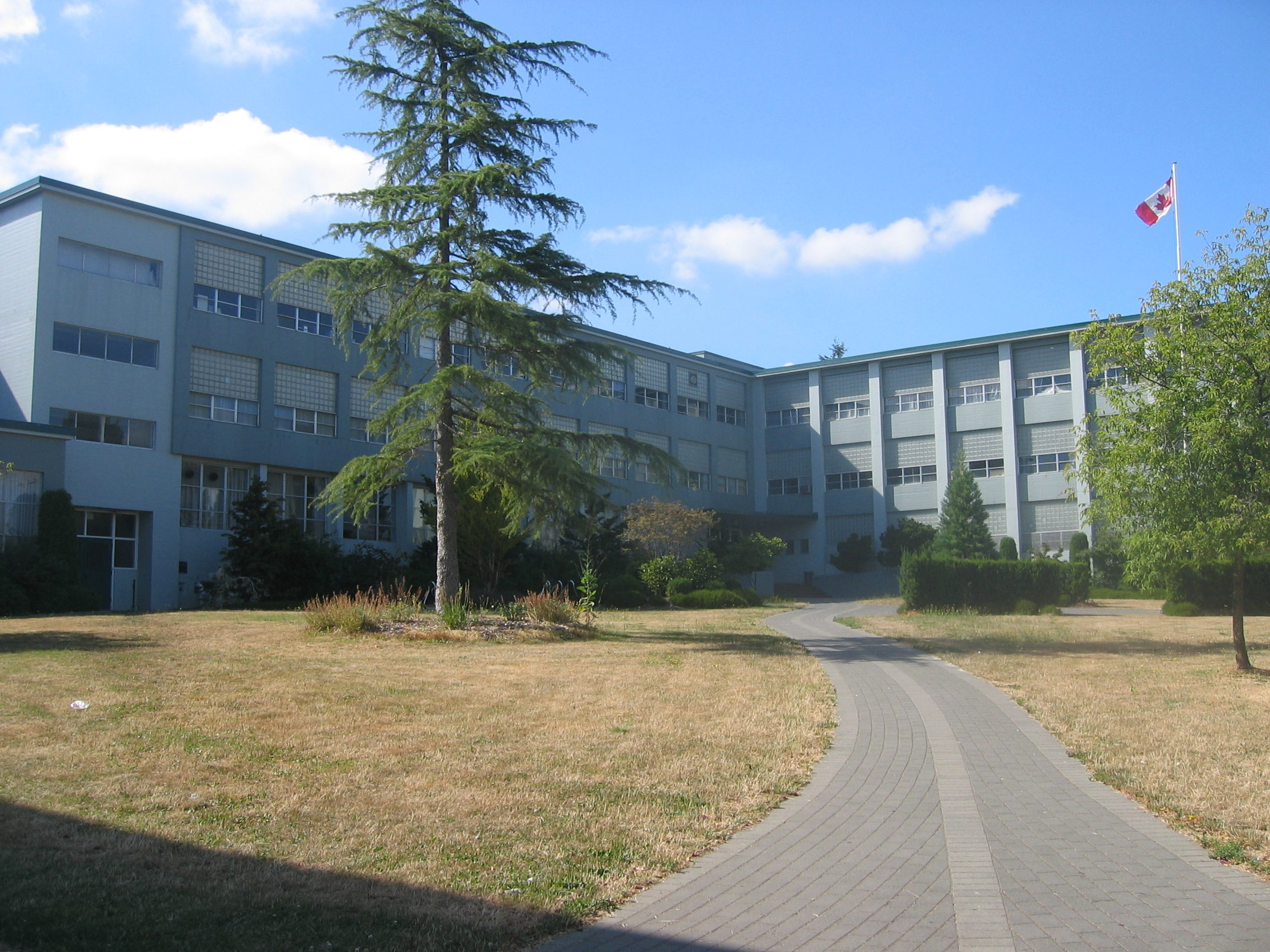

Location
- 7055 Heather Street; Vancouver, British Columbia, V6P 3P7; Canada; 49°13′15″N 123°07′28″W

Information
- School type: Public, Secondary school
- Motto: Latin: Pro Virili Parte (To the best of one's ability)
- Founded: 1956
- School board: School District 39 Vancouver
- Superintendent: Helen McGregor
- Area trustee: Joshua Zhang
- School number: 3939015
- Director: Ranjit Bains (Director of Instruction)
- Principal: Angela Haveman
- Grades: 8–12
- Enrollment: 2015 (2025/2026)
- Capacity: 1850
- Language: English, French Immersion
- Area: Marpole
- Colours: Red, Blue and White
- Mascot: Bulldog
- Team name: Churchill Bulldogs
- Public transit access: 10, 15, 17, 49, 100, Canada Line
- Website: vsb.bc.ca/schools/sir-winston-churchill
- Last updated: October 3, 2026

Sir Winston Churchill Secondary School is a public secondary school located in Vancouver, British Columbia. Churchill Secondary is one of two International Baccalaureate schools (along with Britannia Secondary School) and one of three French immersion secondary schools in the Vancouver School Board. It is named after Winston Churchill, the former prime minister of the United Kingdom. Churchill has the largest student body population in district 39 with about 2000 students in the campus.

Churchill is fed by the surrounding elementary schools in its catchment area. They include Sir Wilfrid Laurier Elementary School, Dr. Annie B. Jamieson Elementary School, Sir William Osler Elementary School, J.W. Sexsmith Elementary School, and David Lloyd George Elementary School. Although not within Churchill's catchment area, L'École Bilingue, Kerrisdale Elementary School, L'École Quilchena and Sir James Douglas Elementary School feed into its French immersion program.

== Special programs ==
=== IB programme ===
Churchill Secondary offers an International Baccalaureate (IB) Programme, which attracts many students from the school district to apply. It is the 277th IB school to open worldwide. The school also offers the IB Certificate Programme, which allows students in the regular BC provincial curriculum to take part in IB courses. This option is only open when there is a vacancy in that particular class. IB courses include English, French, Japanese, Mandarin (cancelled since the school year 2021–2022), Physics, Chemistry, Biology, Geography, History, Art, Psychology, Film Studies, Theatre, Mathematics, and Theory of Knowledge. French immersion students entering the IB Programme may opt to take a more advanced French course (called French A, as opposed to French B for non-French immersion students), allowing them to earn a BC French Dogwood Diploma and a bilingual IB diploma simultaneously, in addition to the standard BC Dogwood Diploma and IB diploma.

Information sessions are held each year for entry into the program which requires a written application, previous academic performance record, and course placement tests.

As part of Global Families, a project where IB students choose a developing country to educate others on, students host World Awareness Day in which they set up displays in downtown Vancouver to teach the public about their country of choice. Students can also get involved as a member of IB Council or as an IB Director.

=== Prelude programme ===
There is also an advanced academics programme for grade 10 students, with the name changed from 'Pre-IB' to 'Prelude' since 2016, due to it no longer being affiliated with the International Baccalaureate organization. Prelude is available for both French immersion and English students currently attending Churchill Secondary. There is one class of French immersion Prelude students and two classes of English Prelude students. The French immersion students taking part in the Prelude program have their French Language and Literature, Sciences, Social Studies, and one additional class in French (referred to as FICO, though the name often changes from year to year) as one group, with only the English classes shared with the non-French immersion Prelude students. The English students taking part in the Prelude program take Prelude Science 10 (which covers grade 10 science, plus previews Chemistry 11, and students take part in a science fair), Prelude English 10, Prelude Social Studies 10, and two special courses which alternate weeks, Prelude International Studies 10, a course where students learn about topics such as International relations, and Climate change, and Prelude Leadership 10, a course where students learn to be better leaders, by working on a Service-learning project during the entire semester. Other classes, such as electives, mathematics, and P.E. are taken with the general school population. There has also been one new class of Spanish Prelude students that started in 2022. Prelude students are graded 1-6, with 6 being the best, and 4 is considered to be proficient. Both English and French Prelude students attend a school camping trip at Evans Lake (British Columbia).

=== Ideal Mini School ===
Ideal Mini School is a grade 8–12 mini school program with 129 students (2010). It is a complete grade 8–12 high school program. It is generally accepted as the "steward school" of Sir Winston Churchill Secondary, although it is run independently under the leadership of head teacher Sandra Hatzisavva. Other than in its small size, Ideal differs from Churchill Secondary in its enriched approach to learning. It offers an intimate and creative environment, and utilizes an informal teaching style where teachers are addressed by their first names and student-teacher trust is held in high esteem. Students at Ideal may join sports teams at Churchill Secondary, as well as clubs and select elective classes in Grades 11 and 12.

=== Synergy programme ===
The Synergy programme is an advanced programme for students in grades 8 and 9 who have demonstrated academic excellence and wish to augment their learning through an enhanced curriculum. A portfolio and an entrance test are required for admission. The program aims to foster critical thinking as well as a sense of community.

=== French immersion ===
Secondary French immersion is for students continuing on from elementary French immersion. There are two types of French immersion programs in elementary school: regular "French immersion" and "late-immersion". "French immersion" refers to French immersion programs that begin at the kindergarten level, while "late-immersion" refers to French immersion programs that begin in the 2nd grade. Students can receive a Bilingual Graduation Certificate. Students in French immersion can also participate in the IB program and receive a bilingual IB diploma. Students participate yearly in a French speech arts competition and are categorized between anglophone and francophone.

== Science fair ==
An annual school science fair is held at Churchill Secondary, and two hundred projects are chosen to represent the school at the Vancouver District Science Fair. Winners there move onto the Greater Vancouver Regional Science Fair, and then onto the Canada-Wide Science Fair.

== Athletics ==
The school's mascot is a bulldog, as Sir Winston Churchill, for whom the school is named, has been compared to a bulldog in political cartoons since the 1940s. It offers volleyball, boys soccer, field hockey, swimming, curling, writing, and cross country teams in the fall; basketball, girls ice hockey, and table tennis teams in the winter; and girls soccer, rugby, track & field, badminton, tennis, golf, girls softball, and ultimate teams in the springtime. Teams are divided by age group: Bantam (Grade 8), Juvenile (Grade 9), Junior (Grade 10), and Senior (Grades 11 & 12).

=== Basketball ===
The school has 8 teams for boys and girls and offers a basketball course to further students' skills. Every year the school hosts the Bulldog Classic, a basketball tournament with schools participating from around the Greater Vancouver region. On March 16, 2014, the Senior Boys Basketball Team won the AAAA B.C. High School Boys Championship against Surrey's Holy Cross.

=== Field hockey ===
Churchill has a Senior AAA field hockey team, which practices on the school campus's upper field. In 2012, Churchill Senior A was almost undefeated in the regular season except for a 1–0 loss against Richmond's McMath. They also won the Vancouver city championship that year. along with the championships from 2015 to 2018. Churchill Senior A had consistently won a seed in the BC AAA Girls Field Hockey Provincials, however, in the 2013 season lost the seat to rivals Eric Hamber Griffins. While taking a dive in provincials in 2018 where they placed 8th, and in 2019 where they placed 13th, they made a comeback in the following years. From 2022-2024, the Senior girls team won back-to-back city championships, and placed third in AAA provincials for three years in a row.

=== Swimming ===
Since 2015 the school has a swimming team that competes on a city level and has taken part in the British Columbia provincial championship.

=== Badminton ===
In 2019, they managed to achieve 9th place at the British Columbia provincial championship, just 2 places lower than their top record of 7th.

=== Churchill E-sports Club ===
As of 2022, Churchill's E-sports team has attended one international and three national tournaments. The team won two national tournament titles and was seeded last in the international tournament, placing second.

== Extra-curricular activities ==
- Winston Churchill is a competitor in Reach for the Top, and has won the provincial championship in 2008, 2009, and 2010.
- Churchill's student-run website SWC social hosts the Churchill's Got Talent music competition powered by online voting and filmed the school's lip dub video.

=== Sustainability ===
Churchill has several sustainability student groups, including the Environmental Club, Climate Strike Club, Recycling Club and Compost Club. The Youth 4 Tap Club also succeeded in banning the sale of plastic water bottles on campus. The school also offers an environmental stewardship course for tenth-graders, which develops sustainability projects and tends to the school vegetable garden.

== History ==
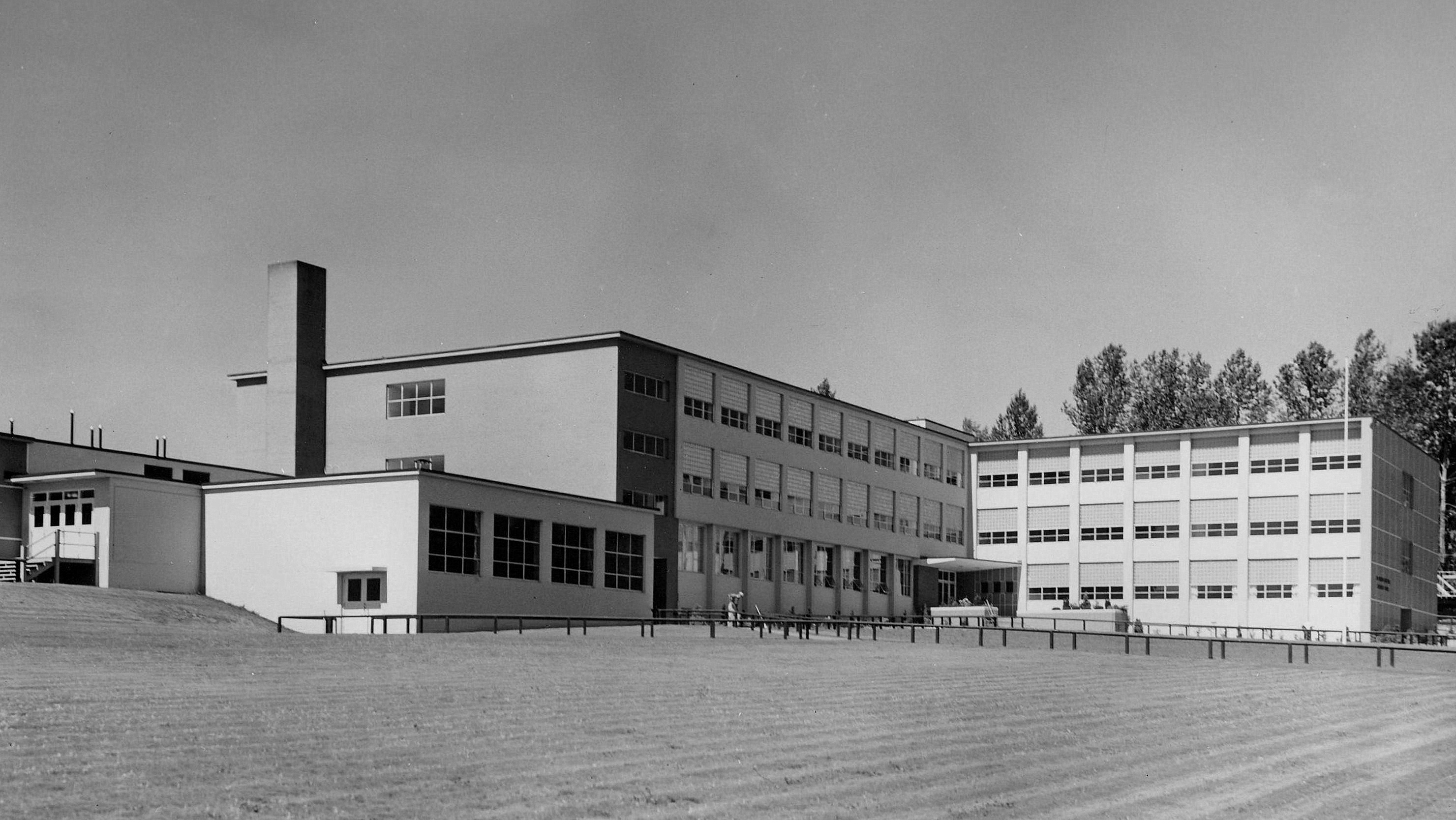
A picture of Sir Winston Churchill secondary taken sometime in 1957 from the south-east side of the school.

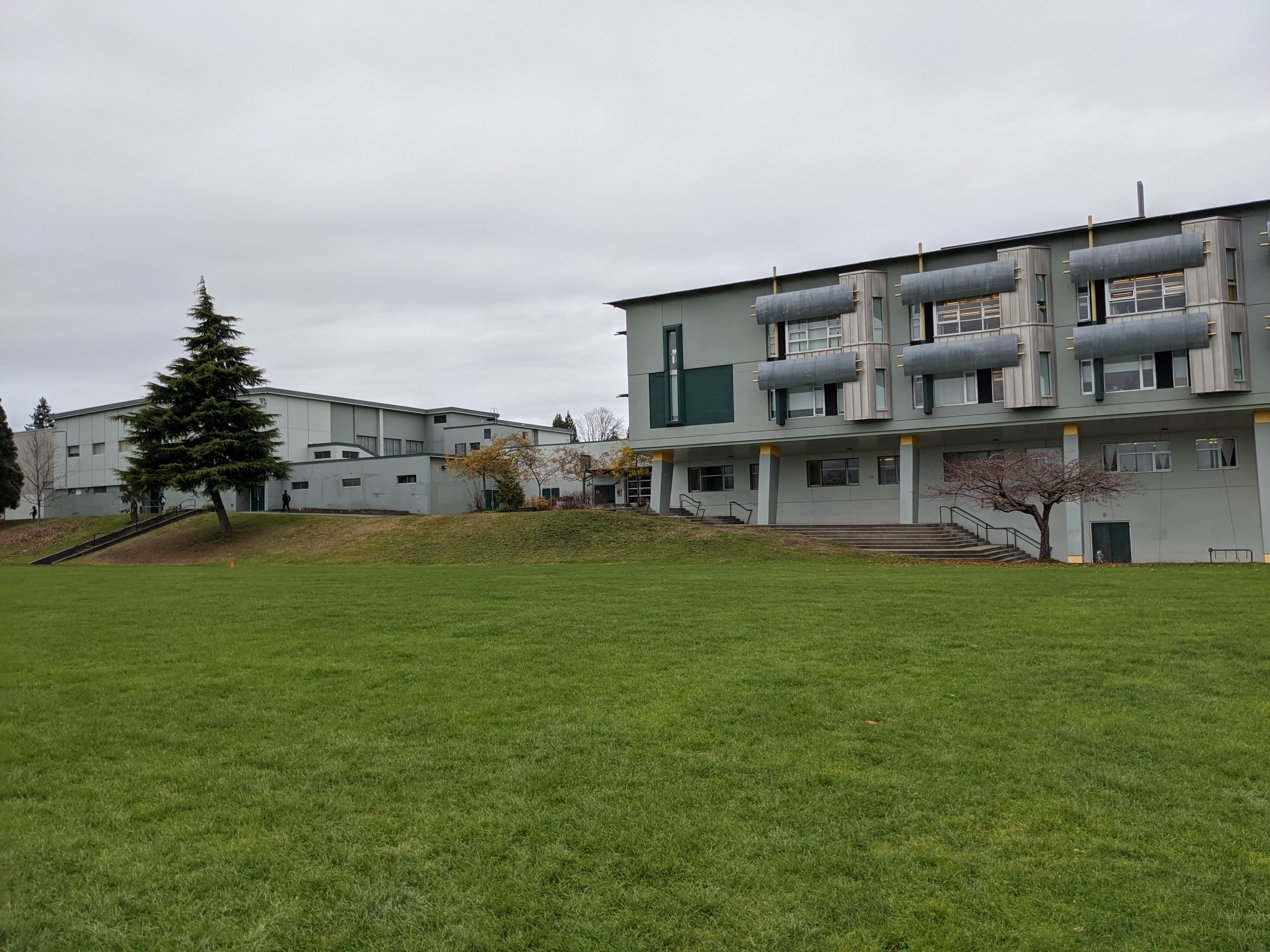
The A-Wing extension seen from the south-east side of the high school.

In 1956 the secondary school was built as a homage to Winston Churchill.

In the early 1990s, the school experienced a surge in student enrollment. To accommodate the increase, portable classrooms were installed south of the main building. By the mid-to-late 1990s, an extension to the school was built as a permanent replacement for the portable classrooms. The extension added two new science labs, several new classrooms and a third gym.

In 2020, an outdoor learning center was built east of the school.

=== Notable events ===
In 2015, a letter containing Churchill's signature was found onsite following a call to "unearth the Vancouver School Board's artistic and cultural possessions".

== Notable alumni ==
Name	Description	Graduation Year	Notes	Citation
Madeleine Arthur	Actress	2015		
Angela Chang (張韶涵)	Singer and actress in Taiwan	2000		
Osric Chau	Actor and martial artist		Student council president	
Shawn Dou (竇驍)	Chinese actor			
Tyla Flexman	Field hockey player			
Mike Harcourt	Former premier of British Columbia		Student council president	
Gregory Henriquez	Architect	1981	Student council president	
Callum Irving	Professional soccer player for Vancouver FC			
Kid Koala	Turntablist			
Eddie Peng (彭于晏)	Taiwanese-Canadian actor, singer, and model.			
John Shorthouse	Vancouver Canucks play-by-play announcer			
Ken Sim	Former mayor of Vancouver		Attended Churchill and Magee Secondary School	
Brad Swaile	Voice actor in the Gundam anime series			
Nicholas Tse (謝霆鋒)	Hong Kong-Canadian singer and actor		Attended in grade 8 only	
Kris Wu	Canadian former rapper and convicted rapist		Attended Churchill before transferring to Point Grey Secondary School	
