= Switchblade (Aespa song) =

Song by Aespa featuring Ty Dolla Sign

from the album Lemonade
- Released: May 29, 2026
- Length: 3:02
- Label: SM
- Composers: Evan Blair; Megan Bülow; David Charles Fischer; Sasha Alex Sloan; Tyrone Griffin, Jr.; Ant Clemons
- Lyricists: Danke; Joowon; Tyrone Griffin, Jr.; Ant Clemons

"Switchblade" is a song released by South Korean group Aespa featuring American rapper Ty Dolla Sign. The song is featured on Aespa's album Lemonade.

== Live performance ==
At Aespa's Lollapalooza performance, the group performed the song alongside Ty Dolla Sign.

== Music video ==
The music video was released on August 4, 2026. “Aespa take charge as they stage a school election. Ty Dolla $ign delivers his verse while wearing a school uniform in a boxing ring”.

== Charts ==
Weekly chart performance for "Switchblade"
Chart (2026)	Peak position
New Zealand Hot	23
