= Tyla Flexman =

Canadian field hockey player

Tyla Flexman (born July 16, 1986 in New Westminster, British Columbia) is a sports executive and a former field hockey player from Canada who played midfield for the Canadian Women's National Field Hockey Team from 2004 to 2012. She is the vice-president of basketball operations of Toronto Raptors in the NBA.

She started playing field hockey in grade 8 at Sir Winston Churchill Secondary School (Vancouver) and played for the Junior Women's National Field Hockey Team from 2004 to 2005, competing in the Junior Pan Am Cup and Junior World Cup in 2005. In 2008, she played her 5th and final year with the University of British Columbia and was selected as the National Gail Wilson Award winner as well as Canada West Player of the Year while completing her degree in Human Kinetics. She was selected to the Senior Women's National Field Hockey Team in 2008 and played center midfield for the team (#18) until her retirement in 2012. During that time she played in the 2010 Commonwealth Games, 2011 Pan American Games, and in two FIH Champions Challenge II Tournaments. In 2012, she won the BC Female Field Hockey Player of the Year. Following her retirement she joined Fortius Sport & Health as a Coordinator for Partnerships and Programs.

She worked as a business development manager for Maple Leaf Sports & Entertainment from 2016 to 2018, then she worked in various positions with Lyft for five years. In August 2024, Flexman was hired by Toronto Raptors as vice-president of basketball operations.

International Competitions

- 2012 FIH Road to London (Olympic Qualifier), India (5th)
- 2011 Pan American Games, Mexico (4th)
- 2011 FIH Champions Challenge II, Vienna (7th)
- 2010 Commonwealth Games, India (6th)
- 2010 Ata Holding World Cup Qualifier, San Diego, California
- 2009 FIH Champions Challenge II, Russia (6th)
- 2009 Pan American Cup, Bermuda (5th)
- 2007 CAN – AM Challenge, Virginia Beach
- 2005 Junior Pan Am Cup, Puerto Rico
- 2005 Junior World Cup, Chile
