= Challenger's Alliance =

2015 Chinese TV variety show

- 挑战者联盟
- Genre: Game-variety show
- Starring: Fan Bingbing; Li Chen; Xie Yilin; Chen Xuedong; Joker Xue; Lin Gengxin; Kris Wu; Dong Chengpeng; Chen Handian
- Country of origin: China
- Original language: Chinese
- No. of seasons: 2
- No. of episodes: 13

Production
- Running time: About 90 minutes

Original release
- Network: ZJSTV
- Release: 12 September 2015

Related
- Daddy Came Back; Journey to the West

Challenger's Alliance, also known as Challenger Union (Chinese: 挑战者联盟), is a Chinese variety show airing on September 21, 2015. In season 1, the show featured an all-star cast of Fan Bingbing, Li Chen, Wu Yifan, Lin Gengxin, Dong Chengpeng, and Chen Handian. Every episode, the cast will spend a day performing a job and finishing a specified task while doing it, if they accomplish the task, they gain a win, if they do not, they fail.

== Cast ==
Name	Career	Nickname	Appearances
Fan Bingbing (范冰冰)	Actress, singer		Season 1 (Episode 1) - present
Li Chen (李晨)	Actor	Bingbing Popsicle (冰冰棒) Big Black Bull (大黑牛)	Season 1 (Episode 1) - present
Xie Yilin	Actress		Season 2 (Episode 1) - present
Chen Xuedong	Actor, singer		Season 2 (Episode 1) - present
Joker Xue (薛之谦)	Singer		Season 2 (Episode 1) - present
Kris Wu (吴亦凡)	Rapper, actor	Fresh Meat (小鲜肉)	Season 1 (Episode 1-9)
Lin Gengxin (林更新)	Actor	林狗	Season 1 (Episode 1-9)
Dong Chengpeng (董成鹏)	Internet personality, director, actor	Dior's Man (屌丝男士)	Season 1 (Episode 1-9)
Chen Handian (陈汉典)	Actor, television host		Season 1 (Episode 1-9)

== Episodes ==
All episodes feature the cast performing a job and finishing a task while doing it.

Season	Episode	In-game Job	Task	Status	Air date
1	Episode 1	Taxi Driver	Earn 600 RMB total from taxi fares	Fail	September 12, 2015
1	Episode 2	Private Trainer	Win the competition against Team Legend	Success, win by 45:44	September 19, 2015
1	Episode 3	Security Guard	Capture the flag	Red wins	September 26, 2015
1	Episode 4	Tourist Guide	Successfully introduce tourists to attractions	Success	October 3, 2015
1	Episode 5	Weight Manager	Lose 0.6 kg in 20 hours doing set exercises	Bingbing won, 2.1 kg	October 10, 2015
1	Episode 6	Magician	Complete tasks	Fail	October 17, 2015
1	Episode 7	Winter Olympian	Complete a series of exercises	Success, 25 kg left	October 24, 2015
1	Episode 8	Estate Manager	Complete tasks	Success	October 31, 2015
1	Episode 9	Veterinarian	Complete tasks	Success	November 7, 2015
2	1	Hotel Staff	Complete tasks and find stolen necklace	Success	June 4, 2016
2	2	Delivery Driver	Find green packages and deliver them to the owners	Success	June 11, 2016
2	3	Librarian	Find the missing story book princesses	Success	June 18, 2016
2	4	Wine Maker	Create a wine that can turn back time	Success	June 25, 2016
2	5	Schoolchildren	Find the key to return to the present	Success	July 2, 2016
2	6				July 9, 2016
2	7				July 16, 2016
2	8				July 23, 2016
2	9	Food vs thrills			July 30, 2016

== Guests ==
Guest	Appearance	No. of Appearances	In-game Job	Team Name
Mengke Bateer	Episode 2	1	Basketball competitor	Team Legend
Sun Yue	Episode 2	1	Basketball competitor	Team Legend
Song Xiaobao	S2 E4, 9	2		
Kris Wu	S2 E5, 9	2	Rapper	

== Reception ==
Episode	Air Date	Rating	Share	Ranking
1/01	September 12, 2015	1.942	5.30	3
1/02	September 19, 2015	1.903	5.60	3
1/03	September 26, 2015	1.847	5.27	2
1/04	October 3, 2015	1.647	4.71	2
1/05	October 4, 2015	1.993	7.11	2
1/06	October 10, 2015	2.586	6.98	1
1/07	November 7, 2015	2.305	7.28	1
1/08	November 21, 2015	1.786	4.59	2
1/09	November 28, 2015	2.162	5.78	1
1/10	December 5, 2015	2.879	7.47	1
