= Lemonade (Aespa song) =

- Zedd remix cover

Single by Aespa

from the album Lemonade
- Language: Korean; English
- Released: May 29, 2026
- Studio: SM Wavelet (Seoul); SM Aube (Seoul)
- Genre: EDM
- Length: 3:07
- Label: SM; Kakao
- Composers: Lewis Jankel; Jordan Shaw; Taylor Upsahl; Cyrus Villanueva
- Lyricist: Ellie Suh (153/Joombas)

Aespa singles chronology
"WDA (Whole Different Animal)" (2026)	"Lemonade" (2026)	"Kiss n Tell" (2026)

Music video
- "Lemonade" on YouTube

"Lemonade" is a song recorded by South Korean girl group Aespa for their second studio album of the same name. It was released as the album's second single by SM Entertainment on May 29, 2026.

== Background and release ==
On April 20, 2026, SM Entertainment announced that Aespa would be releasing their second studio album titled Lemonade on May 29. On May 28, the music video teaser was released. The song was released alongside its music video and the album on May 29.

== Composition ==
"Lemonade" was written by Ellie Suh of 153/Joombas, composed and arranged by Lewis Jankel with Jordan Shaw, Taylor Upsahl, and Cyrus Villanueva contributing to the composition. It is an EDM song characterized by "synth bass rhythm" with lyrics conveying "a positive message of turning any trial and hardship into opportunity" and inspired by the Western proverb "If life gives you lemons, make lemonade".

== Commercial performance ==
"Lemonade" debuted at number 86 on South Korean's Circle Digital Chart in the date issue dated May 24–30, 2026; on its component charts, the song debuted at number five on the Circle Download Chart, number 137 on the Circle Streaming Chart, and number 49 on the Circle BGM Chart.

== Promotion ==
Aespa performed the song on three music programs: KBS's Music Bank on May 29, MBC's Show! Music Core on May 30, and SBS's Inkigayo on May 31.

== Accolades ==
Music program awards for "Lemonade"
Program	Date	Ref.
M Countdown	June 18, 2026	
Show! Music Core	July 11, 2026	

Melon Popularity Award
Award	Date	Ref.
Weekly Popularity Award	June 29, 2026	

== Track listing ==
Digital download, streaming – Zedd remix

1. "Lemonade" (Zedd remix) – 3:02
2. "Lemonade" – 3:07

Digital download, streaming – Marlon Hoffstadt remix

1. "Lemonade" (Marlon Hoffstadt remix) – 2:24
2. "Lemonade" (Marlon Hoffstadt extended mix) – 3:30
3. "Lemonade" – 3:07

Digital download, streaming – 2Spade remix

1. "Lemonade" (2Spade remix) – 2:52
2. "Lemonade" – 3:07

== Credits and personnel ==
Credits adapted from the album's liner notes.

Studio

- SM Wavelet Studio – recording, digital editing
- SM Aube Studio – recording
- SM Blue Ocean Studio – mixing
- 821 Sound – mastering

Personnel

- SM Entertainment – executive producer
- Aespa – vocals, background vocals
- Ellie Suh (153/Joombas) – lyrics
- Lewis Jankel a.k.a. Shift K3Y – composition, arrangement
- Jordan Shaw – composition
- Taylor Upsahl – composition
- Cyrus Villanueva – composition
- Joowon – vocal directing
- Kang Eun-ji – recording, digital editing
- Kim Hyo-joon – recording
- Kim Cheol-sun – mixing
- Kwon Nam-woo – mastering

== Charts ==
=== Weekly charts ===
Weekly chart performance for "Lemonade"
Chart (2026)	Peak position
Global 200 (Billboard)	20
Hong Kong (Billboard)	2
Japan Combined Singles (Oricon)	41
Japan Hot 100 (Billboard)	23
Malaysia (IFPI)	6
Malaysia International (RIM)	4
Netherlands (Global Top 40)	38
New Zealand Hot Singles (RMNZ)	2
Philippines Hot 100 (Billboard Philippines)	70
Singapore (RIAS)	2
South Korea (Circle)	3
Taiwan (Billboard)	1
Thailand (IFPI)	4
UK Singles (Official Charts)	95
UK Indie (Official Charts)	37
US Bubbling Under Hot 100 (Billboard)	7
US Digital Song Sales (Billboard)	11
US Hot Dance/Pop Songs (Billboard)	11
Vietnam (IFPI)	7
Vietnam Hot 100 (Billboard)	38

=== Monthly charts ===
Monthly chart performance for "Lemonade"
Chart (2026)	Position
South Korea (Circle)	3

== Release history ==
Release history for Lemonade
Region	Date	Format	Version	Label
Various	May 29, 2026	Digital download; streaming	Original	SM; Kakao
Various	June 1, 2026	Digital download; streaming	Zedd remix	SM; Kakao
Various	June 2, 2026	Digital download; streaming	Marlon Hoffstadt remix	SM; Kakao
Various	June 3, 2026	Digital download; streaming	2Spade remix	SM; Kakao
