= Like That (Kris Wu song) =

2018 single by Kris Wu

Single by Kris Wu

from the album Antares
- Released: May 18, 2018
- Length: 3:48
- Label: Ace Unit Culture; Interscope; Universal Music China; Go East
- Songwriters: Kris Wu; Markous Roberts; Louis Bell; Jeffrey Smith
- Producers: FKi 1st; Track Bangas; Smitty (co-prod.)

Kris Wu singles chronology
"18" (2018)	"Like That" (2018)	"Freedom" (2018)

"Like That" is a song recorded by Canadian rapper Kris Wu, released on May 18, 2018, through Ace Unit Culture, Interscope, Universal Music China and Go East, as the second single from his debut studio album Antares.

== Background and composition ==
"Like That" was written and composed by Kris Wu, Markous Roberts, Louis Bell and Jeffrey Smith, while production was handled by Fki 1st and Track Bangas with co-production from Smitty.

== Commercial performance ==
"Like That" debuted at no. 73 of the Billboard Hot 100 and in the top forty of the Hot R&B/Hip-Hop Songs on issue date June 2, 2018, and left the chart the following week.

== Charts ==
Chart (2018)	Peak position
US Billboard Hot 100	73
US Hot R&B/Hip-Hop Songs (Billboard)	37
