= Lu Shan (actress) =

Chinese actress and model

- Born: 25 July 1989 (age 37); Zibo, Shandong, China
- Education: Beijing Film Academy
- Occupations: Actress; Model
- Years active: 2012–present

Chinese name
- Simplified Chinese: 卢杉
Transcriptions
Standard Mandarin
- Hanyu Pinyin: Lú Shān

Lu Shan (Chinese: 卢杉, born 25 July 1989) also known as Amber Lu, is a Chinese actress and model.

== Filmography ==
=== Film ===
Year	English title	Chinese title	Role	Notes
2012	Lake of Dragon and Horse	哈琅署火	Chen Shuying	
2013		空冢	Xiao Mai	
2014	Live with a Thief	与贼同屋	Shui'er	
2016	Chang Chen Ghost Stories	张震讲故事之合租屋	Shen Xiaoying / Shen Jiaqi	
2016	Sweet Sixteen	夏有乔木，雅望天堂	Shu Yawang	
2020	Xx Love	月半爱丽丝		

=== Television series ===
Year	English title	Chinese title	Role	Notes
2012	The Legend of Chu Liuxiang	楚留香新传	Hua Zhenzhen	
2015	Secrets of Women	女人的秘密	Jiang Yifan	
2015	Nirvana in Fire	琅琊榜	Consort Jing	
2018	Meet in Youth, Love in Foods	像我们一样年轻	Gao Ya	
2018	Mad House	疯人院	Mu Sifan	
2020	The Legend of Xiao Chuo	燕云台	Xiao Wuguili	
2026	The Lament of Autumn	玉簟秋	Jun Minru	
