= Kris Wu =

Canadian former rapper (born 1990)

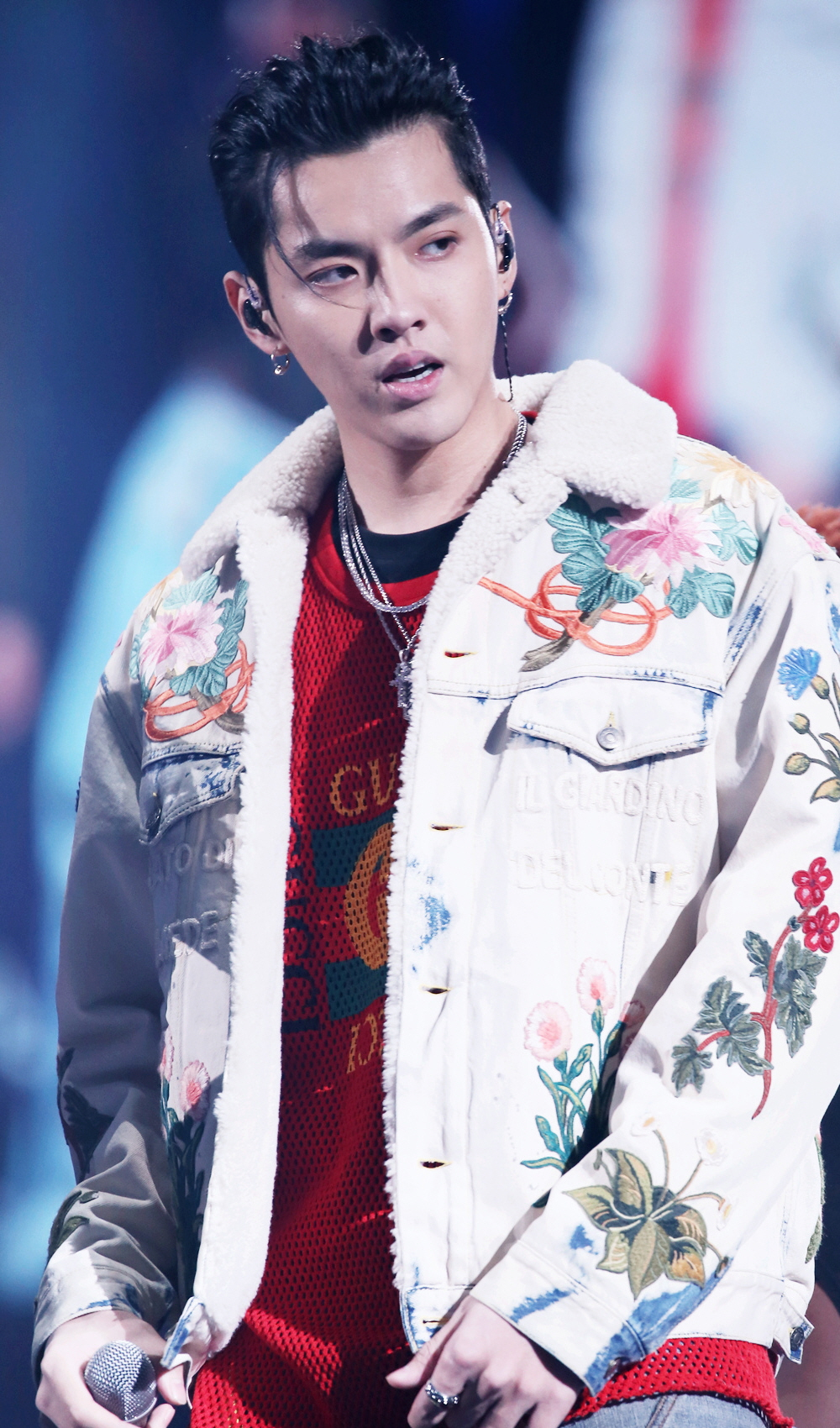
- Wu in 2017
- Born: Li Jiaheng; November 6, 1990 (age 36); Guangzhou, Guangdong, China
- Other name: Wu Yi Fan
- Citizenship: China (1990–2000s); Canada (2000s–present)
- Education: Sir Winston Churchill Secondary School
- Occupations: Rapper; actor; model
- Musical career
- Origin: Seoul, South Korea
- Genres: Hip hop; R&B
- Instrument: Vocals
- Years active: 2012–2021
- Labels: Ace Unit Culture; Interscope; Universal China; Go East; SM
- Formerly of: Exo; Exo-M; SM Town
- Website: kriswuofficial.com
- Criminal information
- Status: Incarcerated
- Convictions: Rape, assembling a crowd to engage in promiscuous activities
- Penalty: 13 years in prison plus deportation

Details
- Victims: 3+
- Date: November — December 2020
- Date apprehended: July 31, 2021

Wu Yi Fan
- Simplified Chinese: 吴亦凡
- Traditional Chinese: 吳亦凡
Transcriptions
Standard Mandarin
- Hanyu Pinyin: Wú Yìfán

Li Jiaheng
- Simplified Chinese: 李嘉恒
- Traditional Chinese: 李嘉恆
Transcriptions
Standard Mandarin
- Hanyu Pinyin: Lǐ Jiāhéng

Signature
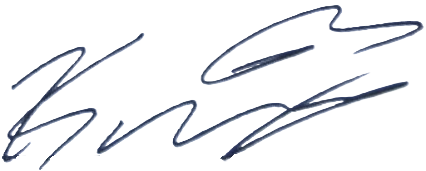

Wu Yi Fan (Note: Chinese: 吴亦凡) (born Li Jiaheng (Note: Chinese: 李嘉恒) on November 6, 1990), known professionally as Kris Wu, is a Canadian former rapper and actor. He rose to fame as a member of K-pop boy group Exo and its subgroup Exo-M under SM Entertainment. Beginning in 2014, Wu pursued a solo career mainly in China, appearing in reality shows such as Challenger's Alliance (2015) and The Rap of China (2017–2020), and starring in films such as Mr. Six (2015), Journey to the West: The Demons Strike Back (2017), XXX: Return of Xander Cage (2017), and Valerian and the City of a Thousand Planets (2017). Wu was ranked 42nd on the Forbes China Celebrity 100 list in 2015, 10th in 2017 and 2019, and 8th in 2020.

Wu was arrested by Beijing police in 2021 and sentenced to 13 years in prison by Chaoyang District Court the following year for rape and group sex. He was also fined CN¥600 million (US$84 million) for tax evasion. After losing his appeal in November 2023, he is serving his sentence in China, after which he will be deported.

== Early life ==
Wu was born Li Jiaheng (Chinese: 李嘉恒; pinyin: Lǐ Jiāhéng) on November 6, 1990, in Guangzhou, Guangdong, to Stacey Yu Wu (Chinese: 吴雨; pinyin: Wú Yǔ; previously 吴秀芹; Wú Xiùqín) and Li Kaiming (Chinese: 李开明; pinyin: Lǐ Kāimíng). Soon after his birth, he was sent to Baiyin, Gansu and was brought up by his grandparents until 5, when he returned to Guangzhou to attend primary school. His parents divorced when he was 10, after which he adopted his mother's surname, Wu, in his Chinese name. The same year, he and his mother immigrated to Vancouver, Canada. In the following years, his mother traveled between Canada and China to manage her business, until she decided to close all her businesses to devote herself full-time to her son.

In 2005, Wu returned to Guangzhou with his mother, who was there to finalize her business affairs. Wu attended Guangzhou No. 7 Middle School, where he was the basketball team captain. He wanted to be a professional player but his mother disagreed. After one year in Guangzhou, when his mother had closed all her business, she took him back to Vancouver against his wishes. He attended Sir Winston Churchill Secondary School before transferring to Point Grey Secondary School. During high school, he held a job as a server at an Asian karaoke parlour, in part to relieve his mother's financial pressure.

In 2007, Wu, who was almost 17 years old at the time, attended SM Entertainment's Canadian global auditions in Vancouver along with a friend. After passing several rounds of selection, Wu traveled to Seoul, South Korea, with his mother that winter. The same year, he changed his legal name to Wu Yi Fan. In a later interview, Wu cited his increasingly tense relationship with his mother and the financial pressure of college tuition as the main reasons he chose to go to South Korea. In the summer of 2008, Wu went to Korea alone, living with dozens of trainees in the dorm next to SM's headquarters in Gangnam, Seoul. He was trained for four years, during which he became friends with American-Korean trainee Kevin Shin, who quit SM in 2010 after three years of training.

== Career ==
=== 2012–2014: Debut with Exo ===
On February 17, 2012, Wu was introduced as the eleventh member of Exo. In April 2012, Exo made their debut and quickly became one of the most popular K-pop groups in South Korea and internationally, achieving commercial success with their studio album XOXO and their hit song "Growl" in 2013. The album became the first album by a Korea-based artist in twelve years to sell over one million copies, and is the 12th best selling album of all time in Korea. Before leaving the group, Wu was featured on Exo's Overdose album, which was released in May 2014 and became the best selling album of 2014 in South Korea.

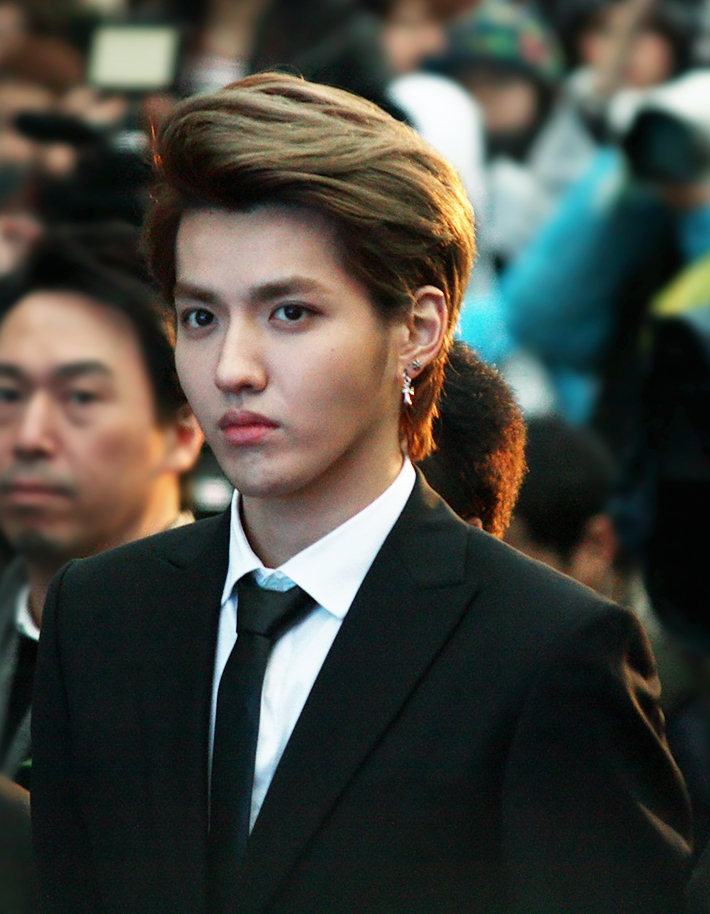
Wu Yifan at Hallyu Star Street, Seoul in March 2014

=== 2014–2016: Solo debut and other activities ===
Wu released "Time Boils the Rain" as part of the soundtrack for the Chinese box office hit Tiny Times 3 in July 2014. In the following year, he became the youngest celebrity to have a wax figure at Madame Tussauds Shanghai and was named "Newcomer of the Year" by Esquire China.

Wu made his film debut in Somewhere Only We Know, directed by Xu Jinglei. The film was released on February 14, 2015, and debuted first place on the Chinese box office, grossing US$37.81 million in six days following its release. He won the "Best Newcomer Award" at the 3rd China International Film Festival London for his performance.

He then starred in his second film Mr. Six, which closed at the Venice Film Festival. The film was a box office hit, grossing over US$137 million and becoming one of the highest-grossing films in China. The same year, Wu starred alongside Liu Yifei in So Young 2: Never Gone and romance melodrama Sweet Sixteen. He won the "Newcomer with the Most Media Attention" award at the Shanghai International Film Festival and "Best Actor" at the Gold Crane Award for his performance. Wu also starred in the blockbuster fantasy film L.O.R.D: Legend of Ravaging Dynasties, directed and written by Guo Jingming.

=== 2017–2021: International appearances and Antares ===
Wu made his runway debut at Burberry's Fall 2016 Men's Show in London. He also took part in the 2016 NBA All-Star Game as a member of Team Canada, coached by Drake.

In January 2017, Wu made his Hollywood film debut in D. J. Caruso's XXX: Return of Xander Cage. He released the single "Juice", featuring Vin Diesel in the music video, as part of the soundtrack on January 19. Wu then starred in Stephen Chow's film, Journey to the West: The Demons Strike Back, playing Tang Sanzang.

In February 2017, Wu represented China at the 59th Annual Grammy Awards ceremony in Los Angeles. The same month, Wu accepted his second invitation to play in the 2017 NBA All-Star Game in New Orleans. Forbes listed Wu their 30 Under 30 Asia 2017 list which comprises 30 influential people under 30 years old who have made substantial effect in their fields.

In July 2017, Wu appeared in Luc Besson's science fiction film Valerian and the City of a Thousand Planets.

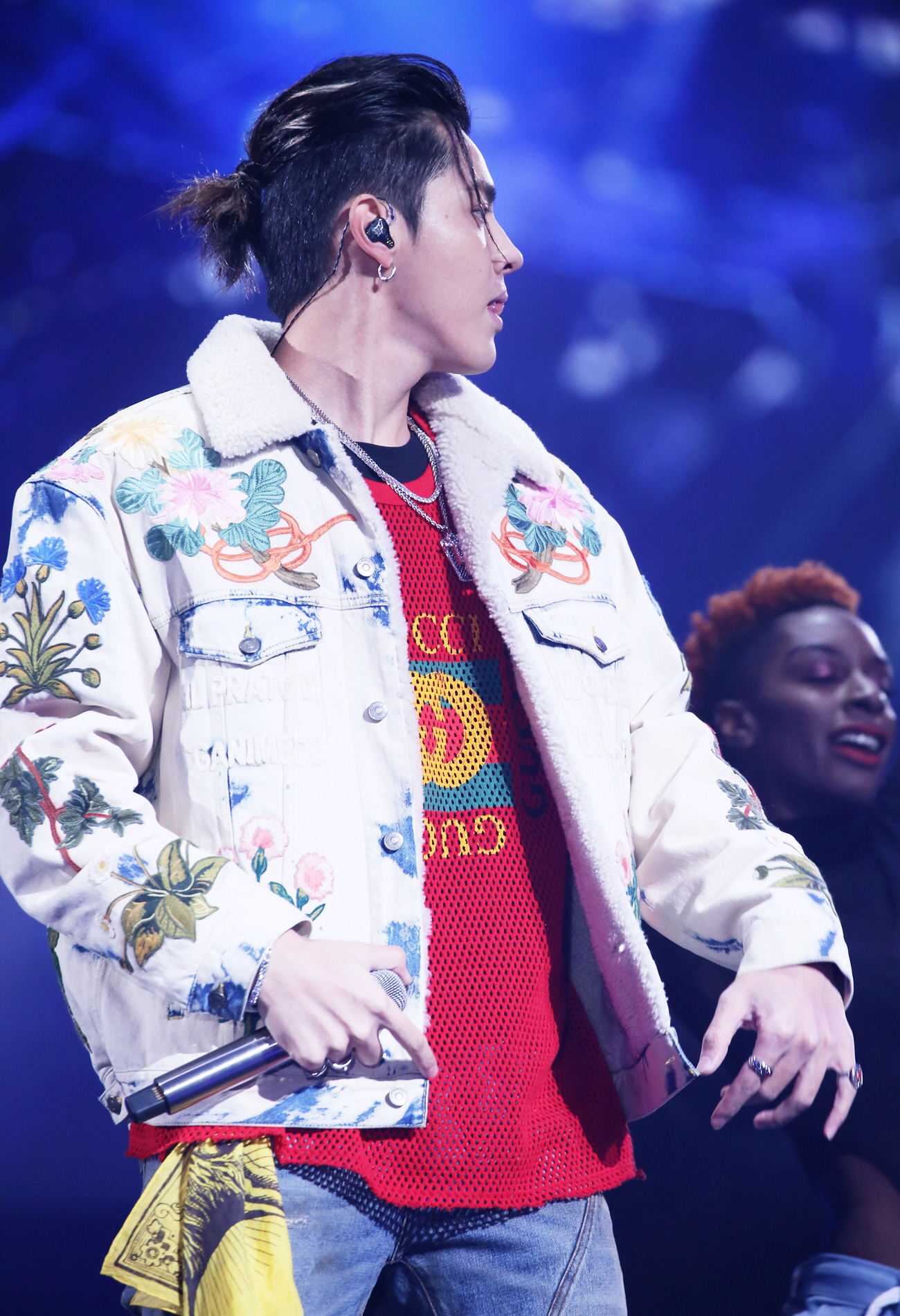
Wu in 2017

In October 2017, Wu released "Deserve", featuring American rapper Travis Scott. Upon its release, "Deserve" placed No. 1 on the U.S. iTunes chart, making Wu the only Chinese artist to achieve the feat. At the end of 2017, Wu released a single, "B.M.". Kris released another single, "Miss You" featuring Zhao Liying on Christmas Day 2017. The music video was released on December 28.

Wu starred in the 2018 Hong Kong-made action thriller Europe Raiders, alongside Tony Leung.

As of April 2018, future music from Wu will be released internationally, excluding Japan and Korea, through a partnership of Universal Music China, Interscope in the United States and Island Records in the United Kingdom Wu's debut album Antares featuring the 2018 singles "Like That" and "Freedom" (featuring Jhené Aiko) was released on November 2, 2018.

On April 19, 2019, Wu released a single, "Big Bowl, Thick Noodle", the music video for which was viewed over 90 million times on streaming site Miaopai. Wu then embarked on his Alive Tour, performing at cities across China. On November 6, 2019, his 29th birthday, Wu released a second single, "Eternal Love", along with an accompanying micro film starring himself and Japanese model Kōki.

On April 22, 2020, Wu released the four-track EP Testing, preceded by the single "Aurora" on April 15. The EP was pre-ordered one million times just 87 minutes after being made available on Tencent streaming platform QQ Music, marking a new record for the platform. The EP features three Chinese songs and one in English.

== Personal life ==
In 2013, Wu was rumored to be in a relationship with Iris aka Lin Xiya with intimate bed photos of them being leaked. In 2021, after Wu was arrested for rape, Lin spoke about the incident from seven years ago on Weibo, saying that the photos were stolen and not self-published. After the leak, she suffered from cyberbullying and became depressed.

On June 21, 2016, internet influencer "Little G Na" (Huang Kaijia) claimed to be Wu's girlfriend and leaked bed photos of Wu. Audios suggesting that Wu mingled with multiple women also surfaced. Wu's studio later stated that the images and audio were fabricated. During this time, Weibo user Wang Jisheng started the hashtag "Paowang (lit. sex king) Wu Yi Fan" on Weibo, leading to a lawsuit from Wu for defamation. On January 12, 2017, the court ruled in favor of Wu, awarding him 32,200 RMB in damages, which bankrupted Wang. In August 2021, after Wu was arrested for rape, Wu's lawyer in the defamation case returned 10,000 RMB, the legal fees that the court had ordered Wang to bear, to support Wang's livelihood.

In 2018, rumors emerged online that Wu held a "bride-show" at a nightclub in Los Angeles. Wu's studio denied the allegations and the Weibo user who posted the rumors later apologized. On August 6, 2021, Chinese-American lawyer Jing Wang in Orange County, California claimed that Wu had raped an underage fan following the "bride-show" in Los Angeles. The victim, now an adult, was preparing to file a lawsuit, but there have been no further developments in the case.

== Endorsements and ambassadorship ==
In 2015, Wu became the youth ambassador for the 3rd Silk Road International Film Festival in Xi'an.

In 2016, he became the first endorser for Mixxtail. Mercedes-Benz chose Wu as their brand ambassador in China for their Smart division and introduced the limited edition "Kris Wu Edition" smart. Wu has also been made the global ambassador for I.T Cashback Card under American Express Hong Kong. The brand made him chief design advisor and the face of their latest in-house brand, Under Garden. He designed the lookbook for the latest collection. Burberry chose Wu as their global ambassador in 2016, making him the first non-British as well as the first Asian person to be the face of the brand. It was reported that Burberry experienced a growth in sales and awareness with Chinese shoppers thanks to Kris' campaign.

Wu made his international debut as the brand ambassador of Bulgari at 2017 BaselWorld.

== Philanthropy ==
In June 2014, Wu joined Heart Ali, a project started by Fan Bingbing and Chen Lizhi (the general manager of Beijing Maite Media). The charity project is aimed at helping children suffering from congenital heart defects in Ngari Prefecture in Tibet.

On January 21, 2016, he launched his own charity project called Extraordinary Honorary Court (不凡荣誉球场), a collaboration project with Sina, Weibo Sports, and Weibo Charity. The goal is to spread basketball in middle schools in China to encourage all basketball-loving youth to continue their dreams of pursuing this sport. Wu was also announced as the ambassador for China's Jr. NBA program and was part of the program's mentor group.

== Legal issues and controversies ==
=== SM Entertainment lawsuit ===
On May 15, 2014, Wu filed a lawsuit against the agency to terminate his contract. SM Entertainment claimed to be completely taken aback despite having dealt with several disputes regarding their contracts in the past.

On July 30, 2015, SM Entertainment filed a lawsuit against Wu and the Chinese companies working with him at the Beijing court, stating that "these activities have infringed the rights of the EXO members and SM, and have caused great financial harm to us and our partners. This is not only an abuse of the system, but also an unethical move that has betrayed the trust of this company and the other members." The following day, Wu released a statement defending himself stating that SM Entertainment had made him leave the group for several months and that SM Entertainment's way of mistreating and neglecting their artists resulted in serious health issues: he had to take medication to be able to work from July 2013 to January 2014, when he was diagnosed with myocarditis. A settlement was reached that he will be under their management in only Korea and Japan.

=== Rape case ===
In late May 2021, footage was leaked showing Wu renting out a movie theater for a date with influencer Chen Ziyi. In early June, Weibo users Liu Jianwen and Li En claimed their friend Du Meizhu had dated Wu from December 2020 until he ghosted her in April 2021, which was attributed to his relationship with Chen. That same day, three men accused Du of cheating on them with Wu; Du acknowledged one, Hang Xiaodi, as her ex-boyfriend from 2020, but denied the other claims. On July 8, 2021, Du publicly accused Wu of sexual misconduct, alleging he enticed women into alcohol-fueled sexual encounters under the guise of career opportunities and claiming to speak for at least seven other victims, including two minors. On July 13, ghostwriter Xu Chi began assisting Du with her campaign against Wu, collaborating with her until July 18. Meanwhile, Liu Tiaotiao, a hairstylist, defrauded both Du and Wu simultaneously online. On July 14, Wu's mother reported the blackmail to the police, unaware that the person posing as Du was actually Liu. Wu was detained on July 31 and formally arrested on August 16, prompting over a dozen brands, including Louis Vuitton, to cut ties with him. On November 25, 2022, the Chaoyang District Court in Beijing sentenced Wu to 13 years in prison—11 years and six months for raping three intoxicated women, plus one year and ten months for organizing group sex—followed by deportation, alongside ¥600 million in fines for tax evasion.

Following Du's allegations, her ex Hang, friends Liu and Li, and ghostwriter Xu all publicly turned against her, accusing her of fabricating key claims, including non-consensual assault and the involvement of minors. The Third Intermediate Court of Beijing heard Wu's appeal on July 25, 2023, and rejected it on November 24, 2023. Following the ruling, Wu's mother issued a statement claiming all three victims, including Du, were adults who never reported the incidents and boasted about their encounters. She claimed one woman initially maintained consent, changing her story to rape only after five interrogation sessions, each over ten hours, involving police coercion. Another woman, an entertainer who dated Wu for two months, offered to testify on appeal that her encounter was consensual, but the court rejected all first- and third-party testimonies disputing intoxication or consent. Pointing to the later disciplining of the lead official handling Wu's case to suggest misconduct, Wu's mother concluded, "I believe in Chinese law... I will continue to appeal on behalf of my son." In 2024, a sympathetic donor accused Du of fraud for exploiting the case, subsequently suing her for defamation following a public dispute. In 2025, the Lingling District Court in Yongzhou ordered Du to pay damages; after Du refused to comply, the court initiated compulsory enforcement in 2026.

== Filmography ==
=== Film ===
Year	Title	Role	Notes	Ref.
2015	Somewhere Only We Know	Ze Yang		
2015	Mr. Six	Xiao Fei		
2016	The Mermaid	Long Jianfei	Cameo	
2016	So Young 2: Never Gone	Cheng Zheng		
2016	Sweet Sixteen	Xia Mu		
2016	L.O.R.D: Legend of Ravaging Dynasties	Yin Chen		
2017	XXX: Return of Xander Cage	Nicks	Hollywood Debut	
2017	Journey to the West: The Demons Strike Back	Tang Sanzang		
2017	Valerian and the City of a Thousand Planets	Captain Neza		
2018	Europe Raiders	Le Qi		
2018	L.O.R.D: Legend of Ravaging Dynasties 2	Yin Chen	Released via Tencent on December 4, 2020	

=== Variety show ===
Year	Title	Role	Notes	Ref.
2015	Challenger's Alliance	Fixed Cast		
2017	72 Floors of Mystery	Fixed Cast		
2017	The Rap of China	Producer		
2018	Super Penguin League; Season:1	Initiator	Live Basketball Competition	
2018	The Next Top Bang	Fixed Cast		
2019	Fourtry 潮流合伙人	Host		
2020	Chuang 2020	Special Guest Judge & Mentor		
2020	The Rap of China 2020	Producer		

=== Television series ===
Year	Title	Role	Notes/Ref.
2012	To the Beautiful You	Himself	Cameo

== Discography ==
- Antares (2018)

== Accolades ==
=== Awards and nominations ===
Year	Award	Category	Nominated work	Result	Ref.
2014	Esquire Man at His Best Awards 2014	Newcomer of the Year	—N/a	Won	
2014	Sohu Fashion Awards	Asian Fashion Icon of the Year	—N/a	Won	
2015	Sina 15th Anniversary	Outstanding Youth Award	—N/a	Won	
2015	22nd Beijing College Student Film Festival	Best New Actor	Somewhere Only We Know	Nominated	
2015	3rd China International Film Festival London	Best New Actor	Somewhere Only We Know	Won	
2015	3rd China International Film Festival London	Best Actor	Somewhere Only We Know	Nominated	
2015	Asian Influence Awards	Most Influential Male God	—N/a	Won	
2015	NetEase Attitude Awards	Idol With Most Attitude on the Silver Screen	—N/a	Won	
2016	Sina Weibo Awards	Weibo King	—N/a	Won	
2016	Sina Weibo Awards	Strong New Actor	Mr. Six	Won	
2016	GMIC X Annual Awards	Mainland China Actor of the Year	Mr. Six	Won	
2016	19th Shanghai International Film Festival	Newcomer with the Most Media Attention	Sweet Sixteen	Won	
2016	Fresh Asia Awards	Most Influential Male Singer of the Year	"Bad Girl"	Won	
2016	29th Tokyo International Film Festival; Gold Crane Awards Ceremony (TIFFJAPAN)	Best Actor	Sweet Sixteen	Won	
2016	The 10th Migu Music Awards	Most Popular Male Singer of the Year (China)	—N/a	Won	
2016	The 10th Migu Music Awards	Top 10 Songs of the Year	"July"	Won	
2016	Tencent Entertainment White Paper	Celebrity of the Year	—N/a	Won	

=== Forbes China Celebrity 100 ===
Year	Rank	Ref.
2015	42nd	
2017	10th	
2019	10th	
2020	8th	
