= Deserve (song) =

2017 single by Kris Wu

Single by Kris Wu featuring Travis Scott

from the album Antares
- Released: October 12, 2017
- Recorded: 2016
- Genre: Hip hop
- Length: 3:02
- Label: Ace Unit Culture
- Songwriters: Wu Yi Fan; Jacques Webster
- Producer: Louis Bell

Kris Wu singles chronology
"I Choose the Road" (2017)	"Deserve" (2017)	"Miss You" (2017)

Travis Scott singles chronology
"4 AM" (2017)	"Deserve" (2017)	"Blue Pill" (2017)

Music video
- "Deserve" on YouTube

"Deserve" is a song recorded by Canadian rapper Kris Wu featuring American rapper Travis Scott. It was released on October 12, 2017, through Ace Unit Culture, as the first single of Wu's debut studio album Antares (2018). The song was written by the performing artists and produced by Louis Bell. A music video for the song was directed by Colin Tilley and released on October 16, 2017.

== Recording and composition ==
"Deserve" was written by Kris Wu and Travis Scott, while production was handled by Louis Bell. The song was recorded in summer 2016 in Los Angeles. Wu told Zane Lowe, host of Apple Music 1: "[...] One of the homies said that he had reached out to Travis Scott, and he was actually in New York. Then we threw out this idea of collaborating and he was really down. He flew out from New York to L.A. and then we met in the studio, kicking it, vibe out a little bit, and then we just got on the record and made this amazing record." Wu later told Beatrice Hazlehurst of Paper that the songs creation "was super organic, Travis was out of town but we had this idea for a collaboration, you know, East and West." The song has been described as an "Auto-Tune driven" hip hop song, which features "harmonizing vocals and mellow raps"

== Reception ==
Billboard's Tamar Herman described "Deserve" as a "trap-laden banger built to be played in clubs around the world."

== Music video and live performance ==
A Colin Tilley directed music video for the song was released on October 16, 2017. On the release day, Wu and Scott performed the song in the Up&Down Club in New York City, organized by 88 Rising.

== Charts ==
Chart performance for "Deserve"
Chart (2017)	Peak position
US Bubbling Under Hot 100 (Billboard)	4
US Hot R&B/Hip-Hop Songs (Billboard)	44
US Rhythmic Airplay (Billboard)	39
