= Somewhere Only We Know (film) =

2015 film by Xu Jinglei

- Film poster
- Directed by: Xu Jinglei
- Written by: Wang Shuo; Xu Jinglei; Shi Qing; Wang Yun; Zhao Meng; Liang Qing'er; Situ Pengli
- Produced by: Jiao Aimin; Meng Bing; Xu Jinglei
- Starring: Kris Wu; Wang Likun; Xu Jinglei; Gordon Alexander; Cong Shan; Juck Zhang; Re Yizha
- Cinematography: Mark Lee Ping Bin
- Edited by: Zhang Jia
- Music by: An Wei
- Production company: Kaila Pictures Co. Ltd.
- Release date: February 10, 2015 (China)
- Running time: 109 minutes
- Country: China
- Languages: Mandarin; English
- Box office: US$45.2 million

Somewhere Only We Know (Chinese: 有一个地方只有我们知道; pinyin: Yǒu Yīgè Dìfāng Zhǐyǒu Wǒmen Zhīdào) is a 2015 Chinese romantic drama film directed by Xu Jinglei. Filming took place in Prague, Czech Republic. The film was released on February 10, 2015.

== Plot ==
Jin Tian (Wang Likun) is a young woman who recently got dumped by her fiancé and lost her grandmother, Chen Lanxin (Xu Jinglei). Feeling heartbroken, she enrolls in a language course abroad and travels to Prague for a change of pace, the city where her grandmother once spent a couple years of her life. In her grandmother's belongings, she finds a letter from 1970, written by Josef Novak, her grandmother's past lover.

In Prague, Jin Tian meets Peng Zeyang (Kris Wu), a young single father who lives with his little daughter and bipolar mother. The two develop a mutual attraction during their journey searching for Josef Novak.

== Cast ==
- Kris Wu as Peng Zeyang
- Wang Likun as Jin Tian
- Xu Jinglei as Chen Lanxin
- Gordon Alexander as Josef Novak
- Cong Shan as Zeyang's Mom
- Sophia Cai Shuya as Ni Ni, Zeyang's daughter
- Juck Zhang as Luo Ji
- Re Yizha as Shanshan

== Production ==
Principal photography started in June 2014 in Prague and ended in August 2014.

== Box office ==
In mainland China, the film grossed US$37.81 million in its first six days debuting at No. 1 at the box office.
