= Sweet Sixteen (2016 film) =

- Poster
- Traditional Chinese: 夏有喬木，雅望天堂
- Simplified Chinese: 夏有乔木，雅望天堂
- Hanyu Pinyin: Xià Yǒu Qiáomù Yāwàng Tiāntáng
- Directed by: Jo Jin-kyu
- Written by: Jo Jin-kyu; Yue Zi
- Produced by: Cui Zhixun; Fu Huayang; Peter Xi; Zhang Lijun
- Starring: Kris Wu; Han Geng; Lu Shan; Joo Won
- Cinematography: Kim Young-ho
- Distributed by: Heng Ye Film Distribution (China)
- Release date: August 5, 2016 (China)
- Running time: 93 minutes
- Country: China
- Language: Mandarin
- Box office: CN¥151.9 million

Sweet Sixteen (Chinese: 夏有乔木，雅望天堂; pinyin: Xià Yǒu Qiáomù Yāwàng Tiāntáng, literally combining the names of the main characters) is a 2016 Chinese romance film directed by Jo Jin-kyu and starring Kris Wu, Han Geng, Joo Won and Lu Shan. It was released in China by Heng Ye Film Distribution on August 5, 2016.

== Plot ==
Xiao Tian and Shu Yawang are close childhood friends. As a high school student, Yawang is asked by her father to tutor Xia Mu, a boy several years younger than her with a traumatizing past who is taken in by her family. Yawang, Tian and Xia Mu grow up together, and Tian and Yawang fall in love and begin a relationship. Although Yawang comes to see Xia Mu as a younger brother, Xia Mu, who grows into a quiet and brooding teenager, develops feelings for Yawang. Tian enrols in a military academy and Yawang goes to college, and they eventually get engaged.

Yawang graduates and starts working for a landscape development company, but becomes the target of unwanted romantic attention from Qu Weiran, the boss of a company that has connections to Yawang's employer. Xia Mu confesses his feelings for Yawang; she replies that she will always be there for him as his older sister, but her heart belongs to Tian. After a company event, Yawang is drugged and raped by Weiran. When Xia Mu finds out about the assault, he goes to Weiran's office to confront him. Yawang races there to stop him from doing something rash, arriving just as Xia Mu shoots Weiran. She rushes Xia Mu out of the building, and he goes on the run. However, Weiran survives the attack, and Yawang discovers that she is pregnant with Weiran's child. She agrees to marry Weiran if he drops the charges against Xia Mu. Heartbroken, she breaks off all contact with Tian, and her parents urge Tian to move on. When Xia Mu learns about Yawang's pregnancy, he brings her to have an abortion, feeling that he would rather ruin his own life than see Yawang and her child live in misery.

Xia Mu turns himself in and is sentenced to seven years in jail. He is saved from life imprisonment since he willingly confesses his crime. Yawang in turn takes her rape case to court. Weiran is found guilty and receives a ten-year prison sentence. Tian asks Yawang to reconsider ending their relationship as his feelings for her have not changed, but she says that they can't go back to the way things were. On a visit to Xia Mu in prison, Yawang tells him that she will wait for him.

== Cast ==
- Kris Wu as Xia Mu
- Han Geng as Tang Xiao Tian
- Lu Shan as Shu Yawang
- Bao Bei'er as Zhang Jingyu
- Joo Won as Qu Weiran
- Zhang Yao as Xiao Xue

== Reception ==
The film grossed CN¥151.9 million at the Chinese box office.
