= Solence =

Swedish electronic rock band

- Origin: Norrköping, Sweden
- Genres: Electronic rock; electronicore; metalcore; pop metal
- Years active: 2012–present
- Labels: Hopeless Records, Better Noise Music
- Members: Markus Videsäter; David Strääf; David Vikingsson; Johan Swärd
- Website: https://solencemusic.com/

Solence is a Swedish electronic rock band from Norrköping, consisting of members Markus Videsäter (vocals), David Strääf (guitar), David Vikingsson (drums), and Johan Swärd (keyboards). The band has been active since 2012 and they have since released the albums Brothers, Direction, Deafening and Hope Is a Cult.

== Discography ==
=== Albums ===
- Brothers (2019)
- Direction (2020)
- Deafening (2021)
- Hope Is a Cult (2023)
- Angels Calling (2025)

=== Singles ===
- 2014 - "Warriors"
- 2014 - "Immortals"
- 2017 - "Shape of You"
- 2017 - "The Show Must Go On"
- 2017 - "2U"
- 2017 - "Legends Never Die"
- 2018 - "Believer"
- 2018 - "Toxic"
- 2019 - "The Hills"
- 2020 - "Take Over"
- 2021 - "Good F**King Music"
- 2021 - "Deafening"
- 2021 - "Thunder"
- 2021 - "Indestructible"
- 2021 - "Speechless"
- 2021 - "Push Me to the Edge"
- 2021 - "Vampire"
- 2021 - "Phoenix"
- 2022 - "Cold"
- 2022 - "Rain Down"
- 2022 - "Demons"
- 2022 - "Blood Sweat Tears"
- 2022 - "nuBlood"
- 2023 - "Antidote"
- 2024 - "F**k the Bad Vibes"
- 2024 - "A Banger a Day Keeps the Doctor Away"
- 2024 - "Who You Gonna Call? (Solence)"
- 2025 - "Where Were You..?"
- 2025 - "Monsters In My Head"

=== Music videos ===
Year	Song	Director
2015	"Pump More Life"	Unknown
2016	"Breaking the Silence"	Lucas Englund
2016	"Load"	Unknown
2019	"Ghosts"	Unknown
2019	"Heaven"	Andreas Ford
2019	"Heavy Rain"	Unknown
2019	"Death Do Us Part"	Andreas Ford
2019	"Spit It Out"	Andreas Ford
2019	"Brothers"	Andreas Ford
2021	"Good F**King Music"	Andreas Fred and Daniel Fred
2021	"Indestructible"	Unknown
2021	"Dead Tomorrow"	Unknown
2022	"Rain Down"	Zak Pinchin
2022	"Blood Sweat Tears"	Myles Erfurth
2022	"nuBlood"	Myles Erfurth
2023	"Best For You"	Myles Erfurth
2023	"Life Goes On"	Myles Erfurth
2024	"F**k The Bad Vibes"	Unknown
2024	"A Banger A Day Keeps The Doctor Away"	Myles Erfurth
2024	"Who You Gonna Call?"	Johan Lundsten
2025	"Wish You the Worst"	Kristoffer Jansson
2025	"Monsters In My Head"	Kristoffer Jansson
