= Smitty (rapper) =

American rapper

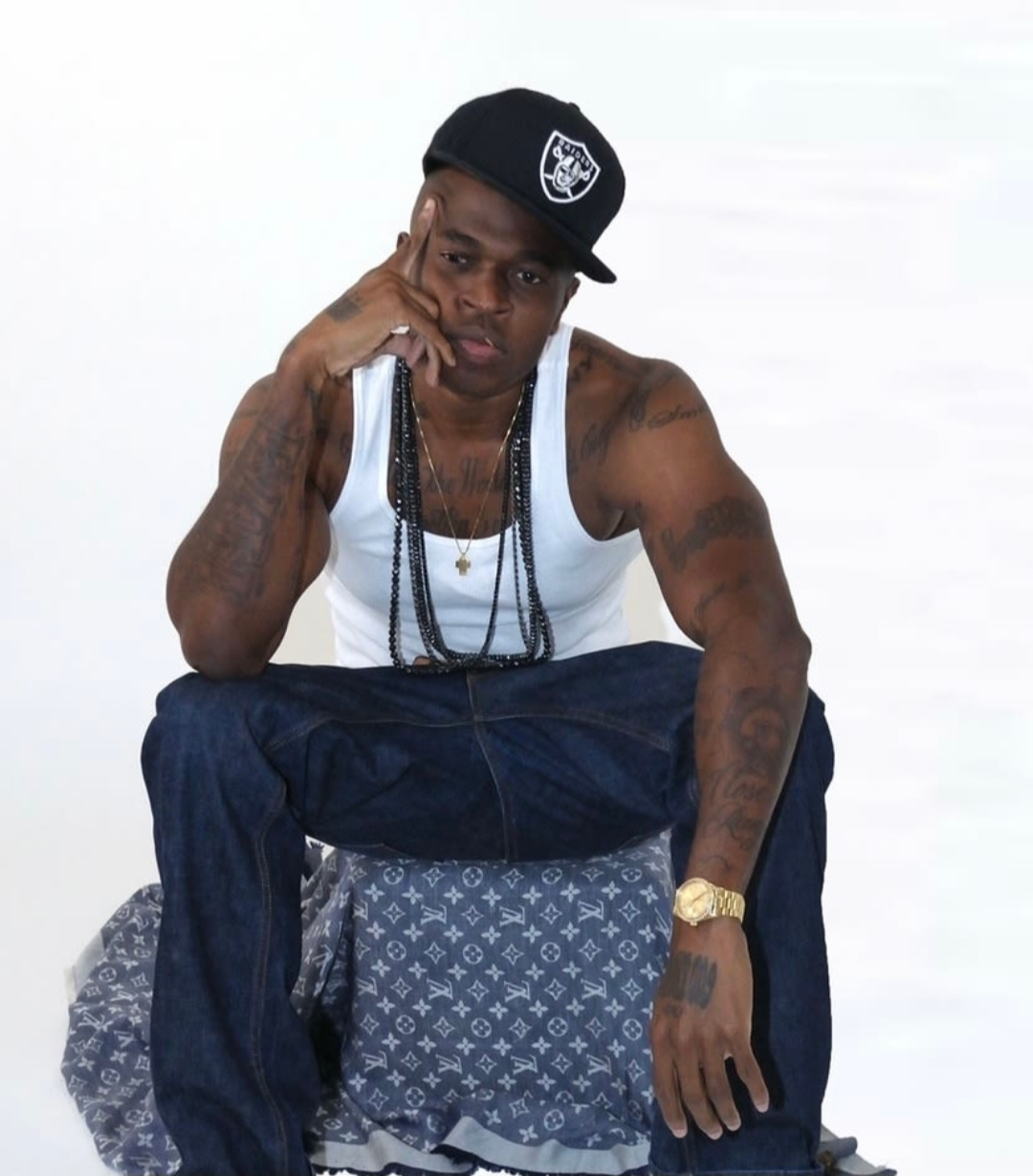
- Smitty in 2012

Background information
- Born: Varick D. Smith; November 30, 1979 (age 46)
- Origin: Little Haiti, Miami, Florida, U.S.
- Genres: Southern hip-hop
- Occupations: Rapper; songwriter
- Labels: Blackground; Interscope; Panaroyal; Close Range; Universal; J
- Website: Official site

Varick D. Smith (born November 30, 1979), better known by his stage name Smitty, is an American rapper and hip-hop ghostwriter from Little Haiti, a neighborhood in Miami, Florida.

== Biography ==
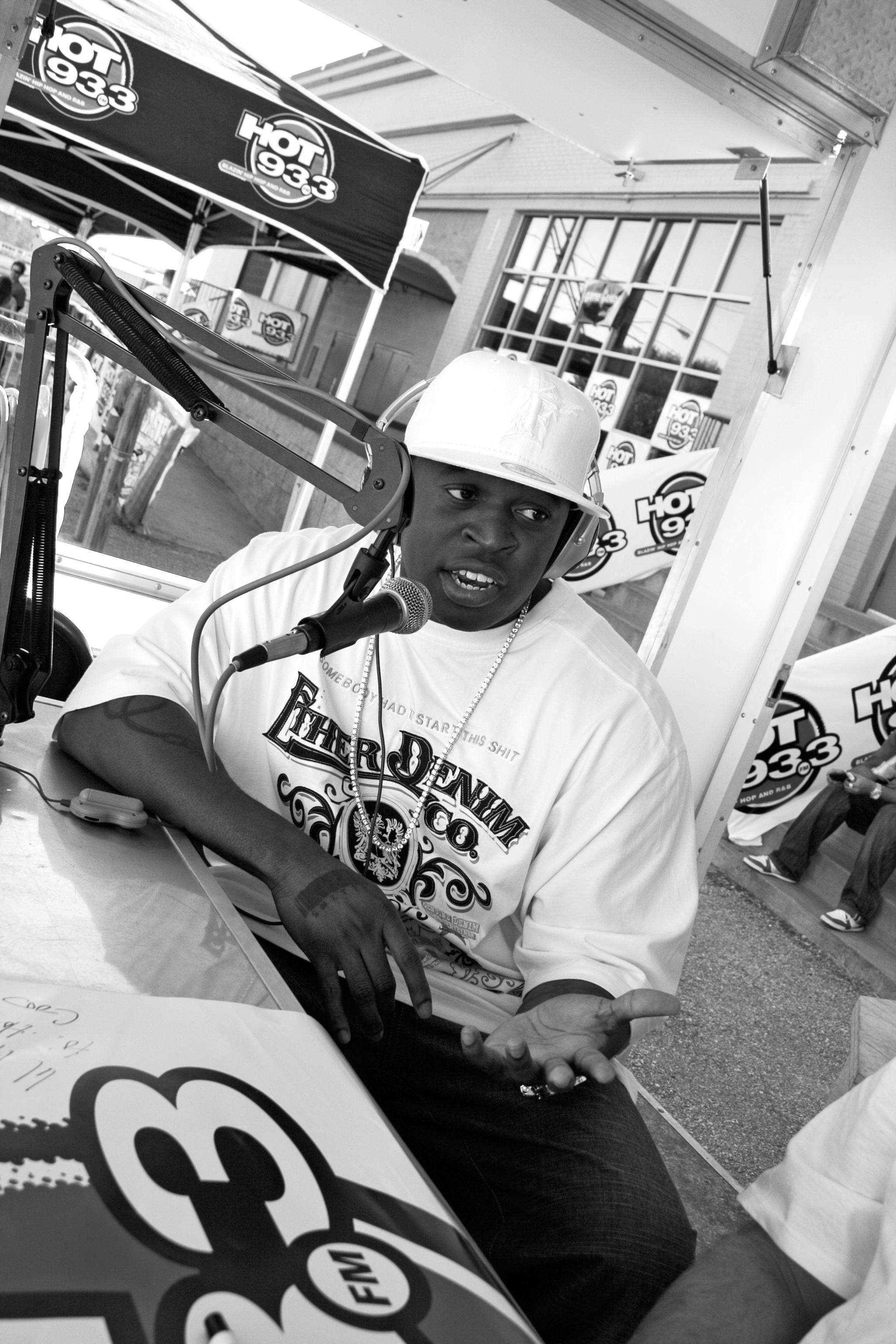
Smitty on Hot 93 in 2005

While growing up in Miami, Varick came home one day to find a friend deceased due to an unforeseen incident. The incident made him more aware of his future. In 1997 he decided to enroll at Florida A&M University to major in journalism. However, his aspiration to become a full-fledged artist led him to switch coasts after only two and half years of school. He would eventually, through a friend, get the opportunity to start in the hip-hop industry by flying out to meet with famed producer Dr. Dre while he was filming The Wash. After many hours waiting around on set, Varick finally got the chance to rap in front of Dr. Dre. Dr. Dre was impressed and Varick was asked to work on a few tracks for The Wash soundtrack. He is also a good basketball player.

In addition to working on the soundtrack, Varick wrote two Billboard Hot 100 chart-toppers, "Shake Ya Tailfeather" by P. Diddy, Nelly & Murphy Lee for which he won a Grammy for Best Performance at the 2004 awards and "Bump, Bump, Bump" by B2K. He also has collaborated with fellow hip-hop artists such as Trick Daddy, Scarface, Kanye West, T.I., and BMG.

In 2011 Smitty reunited with Breyon Prescott, producer of such acts as Jamie Foxx, Angie Stone, Dr. Dre, Sean Garrett and Brandy. Smitty and Prescott teamed up with Sean Garrett, Bink and Mississippi newcomer Tito Lopez in 2012 to put the finishing touches on Dr. Dre's highly anticipated Detox album. Smitty has a co-writing credit on Rick Ross's 3 Kings featuring Dr. Dre and Jay Z.

Smitty has also written songs for Snoop Dogg, Brandy, Pharrell and his longtime mentor Diddy, who is featured on his new street banger, Money Hungry, which dropped in September 2012. In 2015 Smitty wrote with legendary producer Dr. Dre on the Straight Outta Compton movie soundtrack and in that same year was a ghost writer on several projects produced by Timbaland. He then worked with Pras of the Fugees on their up-and-coming highly anticipated album. In addition to working on the Fugees new project, Smitty co-wrote with producer Bink for West Coast rapper E-40.

== Record deals ==
Opportunities to sign with Aftermath Entertainment, Arista Records, Capitol Records, Def Jam Recordings, Elektra Records, and Jive Records were all offered, but were turned down in lieu of creative freedom.

Smitty eventually signed with Clive Davis' J Records in 2003. In April 2008, Smitty parted ways with J, and signed with Blackground/Interscope Records by the following year. He released no albums with any of the aforementioned labels.
