= Rape in China =

Sexual violence in China

In 2007, the U.S. Department of State reported 31,833 rapes in the People's Republic of China (PRC), but no similar report by the PRC government has been made available. Same-sex sexual assault between male adults was made illegal in late 2015. Domestic and foreign victims of sex trafficking in China are raped.

== History ==
=== Imperial China ===
During the Qing dynasty (1644–1912), rape was very difficult to prove. A woman who was sexually attacked had to prove that she had offered the utmost resistance and fought vigorously throughout the entire ordeal. Failure to do so would expose the woman herself to criminal prosecution for being complicit in "consensual illicit intercourse".

=== Second Sino-Japanese War ===
Rape was committed by Imperial Japanese Armed Forces personnel in China during the Second Sino-Japanese War. Rapes occurred during, but were not limited to, the Nanjing Massacre and at Unit 731 facilities. Comfort women from China were sex trafficked and sexually assaulted.

Shortly after the war in 1946, a United States Marine raped a Peking University student in the Shen Chong case.

=== Cultural Revolution ===
Pan Suiming, Emily Honig, and others documented that rape and sexual abuse of sent-down women were common during the Cultural Revolution's height. Tania Branigan documented that women raped tended to be from educated urban backgrounds while their rapists were poor peasants or local officials.

=== 21st-century China ===
Rape crimes in 21st-century China include, but are not limited to, the Yang Xinhai case, the Kris Wu rape case, the Li Guangjun rape murders, the Li Hao rape murders, and the 2013 Li Tianyi gang rape.

==== Uyghurs ====
There have been reports of systematic rape and sexual abuse of ethnic Uyghur women by Chinese authorities in Xinjiang re-education camps as part of the Chinese government's persecution of Uyghurs.

== Prevalence, analysis and statistics ==
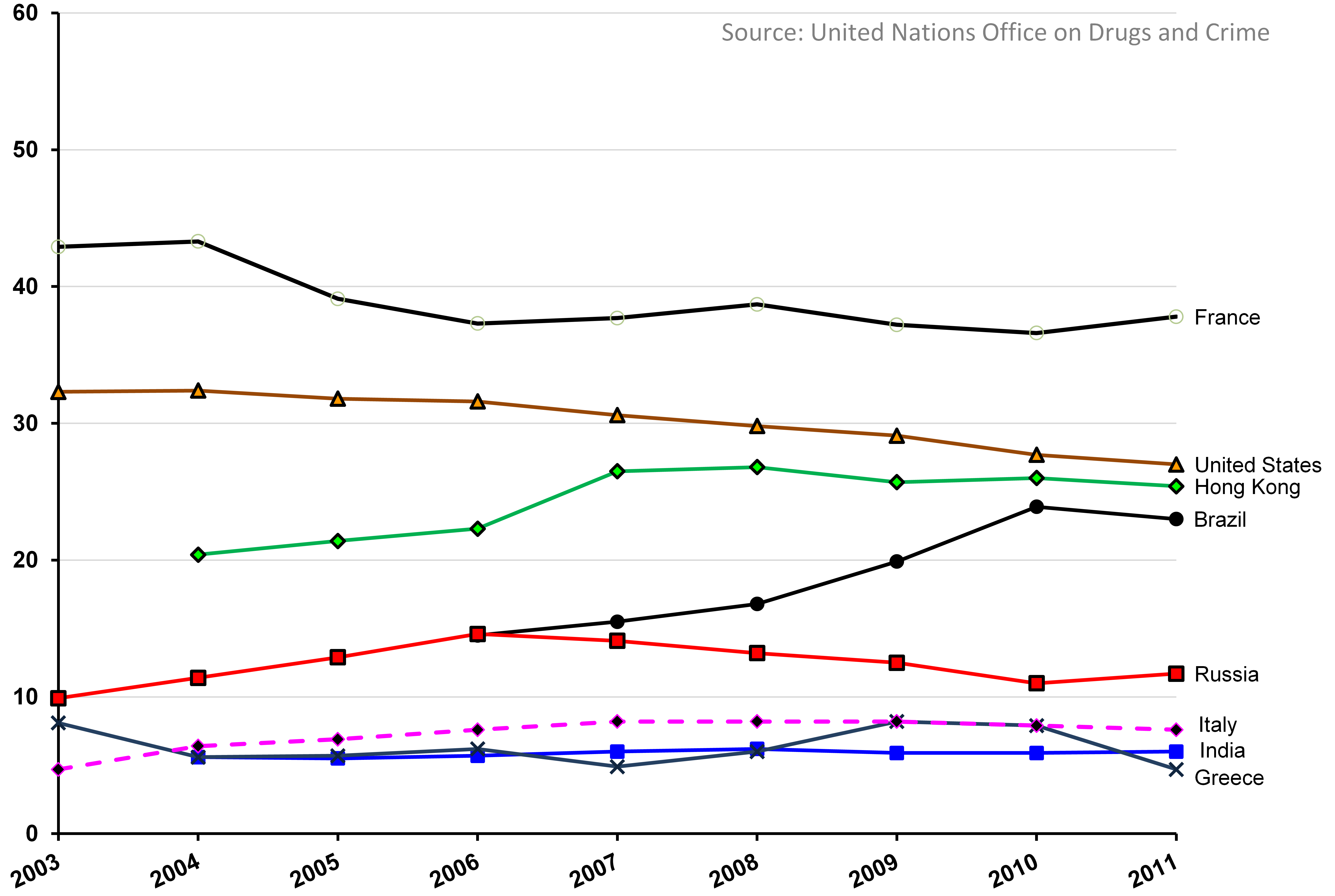
Annual rape and all forms of sexual assaults per 100,000 people

Luo Tsun-yin, a social psychologist at Shih Hsin University in Taiwan, asserts that fewer than 10% of rape cases are reported.

The 2013 Multi-country Study on Men and Domestic Violence asked Chinese men whether they had ever coerced a female partner into having sex (including alcohol facilitated rape): 22.2% said yes, 9.3% had done so in the past year, 19.4% raped their partner, 55% of the men who had raped had done so more than once, and 9% had done so to four or more partners; 86% cited sexual entitlement as their motive (the highest percentage in the study) and 57% answered that they raped out of boredom; 72.4% experienced no legal consequences, 1.7% had raped another man, 25.1% who had raped reported first doing so as a teenager, and 2.2% admitted to having committed gang rape.

A report conducted by the All-China Women's Federation estimated that close to ten percent of married or committed Chinese women experience physical or sexual violence. Recent research has found that there exists no psychometric measure which can assess attitudes toward rape in China. For example, researchers found that men endorse the view that revealing clothing conveys consent for sex.

== Social stigma cast on victims of rape ==
Victims of rape in China often remain silent and do not report the crime because traditional culture holds that being raped is shameful and should be kept private. Popular activist Guo Jianmei told the story of a villager who raped over 100 women, and asserted that "not one of them spoke up." In another incident, a girl and her mother tried to register a complaint against a rapist, but Zhong Xiancong, a police official, did not register it and suggested to the victim, "To protect your reputation, you should forget about the whole thing."

Rape is regarded as taboo in Chinese culture, and the victim is often rejected by society, as the culture views women as solely responsible for the rape. One American victim of rape in China stated that she felt she would have been prosecuted by the state if she had tried to speak out against the rape.

== Law ==
The laws against rape in China have been criticized by some, including Guo Jianmei, who noted that weaknesses in the legal system make it possible for certain rapists to escape justice; furthermore, legal loopholes previously allowed child rapists to escape with light sentences.

In 2011, a man who raped another man was convicted of "intentional injury" rather than rape, as non-consensual same-sex sexual conduct was not defined as a sexual offense.

In November 2015, China Daily reported another same-sex case which happened in Luzhou city, Sichuan province. In this case, a man robbed and raped another man, but did not face sanction for the crime of sexual assault.

In November 2015, Xinhua News Agency reported that the criminal code was amended to include the sexual assault and rape of men, citing the above case. In addition, sex with underaged (defined as under 14 years of age) prostitutes was reclassified as rape.

In recent years some additional legislation has been passed. The Draft Law was the first to define domestic violence in China, and its benefits include outlining how to obtain restraining orders, and providing guidelines to officials such as judges and police officers with how to handle cases of domestic violence in congruity with the law. However, there are weaknesses in this law as it only covers family members, and excludes protection for unmarried, divorced, dating, and LGBTQ partners. It also doesn't attempt to combat economic abuse which is all too easily perpetrated illegally under China's marriage law. The Draft Law falls significantly short of international standards, including those of surrounding Asian countries.

Subsequent detailed rules address how criminal procedure should provide child witness protections in sexual offense cases. In 2023, justice agencies issued the Opinions on Handling Criminal Cases of Sexual Violations of Minors, which in American and British English would translate to Adjudicative Guidelines for Sex Crimes Against Minors. The guidelines set out standardized procedures for forensic interviews aimed at minimizing secondary victimization of minor complainants. Investigators must perform forensic interviews in a one-to-one, child friendly interview setting with a chaperone present where possible, using age-appropriate question formats, while making complete, unedited audiovisual recordings for admission as prior recorded testimony. Judges in hearings must not require minors to give live testimony whenever feasible, to use witness shielding procedures or playing recorded testimony as necessary, and to limit or terminate any questioning that risks causing physical or psychological harm.

The majority of the Asian region has progressed towards a “second generation of lawmaking,” adopting a more comprehensive definition of violence consistent with the Declaration on the Elimination of Violence against Women (DEVAW) definition. China's current laws are significantly more restricted, seemingly with policies predating the Beijing Declaration.

== See also ==
- Sex trafficking in China
- Sexual slavery in China
- Yan Xiaoling – Fan Yanqiong case
- Hooligan Sparrow
- Long Meiyi
