= Crime in Hong Kong =

Crime in Hong Kong is present in various forms. The most common crimes are thefts, assaults, vandalism, burglaries, drug offenses, sex trafficking, and triad-related crimes.

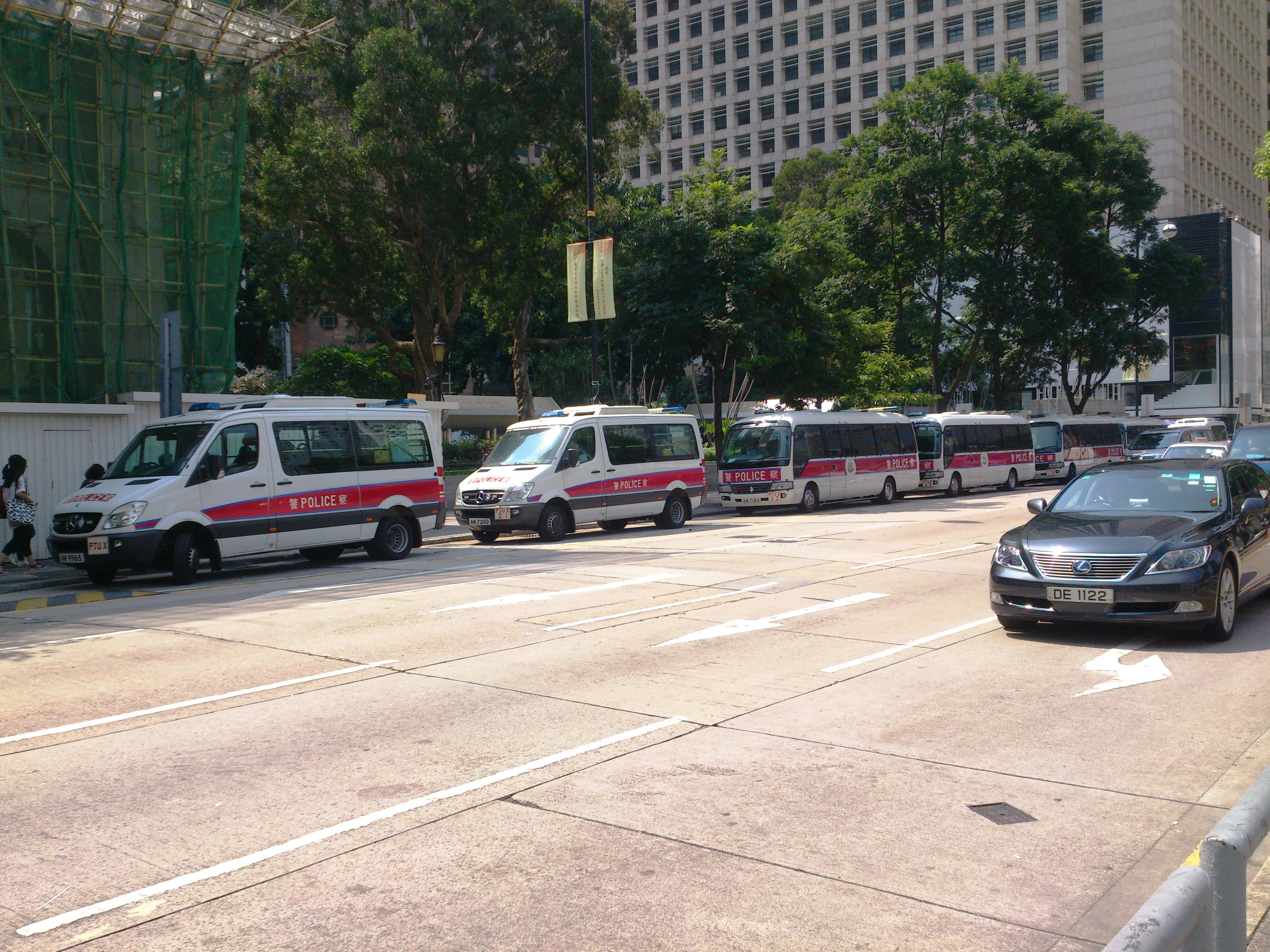
Police vehicles in Hong Kong

== Statistics ==
Crime rate	2010	2011	2012	2013	2014	2015	2016	2017	2018	2019	2020	2021	2022	2023
Homicide total	35	17	27	62	27	22	28	24	48	24	22	23	30	28
Homicide rate	0.5	0.2	0.4	0.9	0.4	0.3	0.4	0.3	0.7	0.3	0.3	0.3	0.4	0.4
Violence total	13546	13100	12821	12153	11073	10889	10103	9086	8884	9690	9391	9587	8830	10122
Violence rate	192	185	180	169	153	149	138	123	119	129	125	129	120	135
All crime total	75965	75936	75930	72911	67740	66439	60646	56017	54225	59225	63232	64428	70048	90276
All crime rate	1075	1074	1064	1014	936	909	825	758	728	789	842	869	961	1204

In the year 2018, crime dropped to a 39-year low for Hong Kong. There were 8,884 reported incidents of violent crimes in Hong Kong at that time. In 2018, Hong Kong had 48 homicides, 4,593 incidents of wounding and serious assaults, 147 robberies, 1,575 burglaries, and 63 rapes. After 2018, crime rate are increasing every year (as of 2023). In the 2000s, the number and rate of murders were the highest in 2002. 2011 had the lowest rate and number of murders, at 17 (0.2 murders per 100,000 people). The homicide rate increased 129.6% in 2013 from 2012 though this was due to the inclusion of 39 deaths from the Lamma Island ferry collision.

The most common forms of crime in Hong Kong are non-violent crimes. There were 27,512 reports of theft in Hong Kong in 2015. The most common forms of theft were miscellaneous thefts, shoplifting, pick-pocketing, and vehicle theft. Criminal damage is also a common crime in Hong Kong, with 5,920 reports in 2015.

== Organised crime ==
Crimes committed by triads occur in Hong Kong. Common triad-related offenses include extortion, illegal gambling, drug trafficking, and racketeering. One of the world's largest triads, Sun Yee On, was founded in Hong Kong in 1919 and is reported to have 55,000 members worldwide. Sun Yee On's rival organisation, 14K Triad, was formed in Guangzhou, Guangdong, China in 1945, and relocated to Hong Kong in 1949. According to British criminal Colin Blaney in his autobiography Undesirables, British organised crime groups known as the Wide Awake Firm and the Inter City Jibbers that specialise in jewelry thefts and picking pockets have also been known to operate in Hong Kong.

== Human trafficking ==
Hong Kong is a known transit city for human trafficking; victims are often coerced into forced labour or sexual exploitation.

=== Sex trafficking ===
Domestic and transnational criminal organisations carry out sex trafficking in Hong Kong. Victims of forced prostitution are often assaulted in brothels, homes, and businesses in the city. Many mainland Chinese prostitutes in Hong Kong are victims of sexual trafficking. There is no comprehensive anti-human trafficking law in Hong Kong.

== Racism ==
There have been reports of systematic racism in Hong Kong against non-Chinese or "dark-skinned" citizens.

== Knife attacks ==
Knife crimes and attacks are an issue in Hong Kong. In 2022, local media such as Channel C coined the term "國際大刀會", which can be translated literally as "international knife metropolis", to describe a spike in knife attacks in the city.

== Fraud ==
In 2022, fraud cases rose 45 percent compared to the previous year. The first five months of 2023 saw an almost 60 percent increase in fraud cases. There have been reports of human traffickers forcing Hongkongers to work in overseas fraud factories. Victims are often forced to commit cyber scams, and are at risk of violent retaliation from their traffickers if they fail to perform.

== See also ==
- Crime in China
- Human trafficking in Hong Kong
- Hong Kong Police Force
- List of countries by intentional homicide rate
