= Crime in China =

People's Republic of China
- Crime rates* (2020)

Violent crimes
- Homicide: Unknown
- Rape: Unknown
- Robbery: Unknown

Property crimes
- Burglary: Unknown
- Note: Reported crimes per 100,000 population

The government of the People's Republic of China does not release exact unified statistics on crime rates and the rate of criminal offending. Scarce official statistics released are the subject of much academic debate due to allegations of statistical fabrication, under-reporting and corruption.

According to the Global Organized Crime Index (2023), China is grappling with deep-seated criminal activities across diverse markets, while its resilience is limited by corruption and the centralized control of governance and information.

== History ==
A distinguishing feature of the Qin dynasty was its treatment of criminals: harsh but careful and fair. Succeeding dynasties moderated the law in various ways. In the Ming dynasty, commercialization and urbanization meant that scams abounded. Fences who disposed of stolen goods thrived. The People's Republic of China (PRC) was established in 1949 and, from 1949 to 1956, underwent the process of transferring the means of production to common ownership. During this time, the new government worked to decrease the influence of criminal gangs and reduce the prevalence of narcotics and gambling. Efforts to crack down on criminal activity by the government led to a decrease in crime.

Between 1949 and 1956, larceny, arson, rape, murder, and robbery were major nonpolitical offenses. The majority of economic crimes were committed by business people who engaged in tax evasion, theft of public property, and bribery.

Government officials also engaged in illegal economic activity, which included improperly taking public property and accepting bribes. Between 1957 and 1965, rural areas experienced little reported crime. Crime rates increased later. The year 1981 represented a peak in reported crime. This may have been correlated to the reform and opening up from 1978, which allowed some elements of a market economy and gave rise to an increase in economic activity. Below is a comparison of reported cases of crime from 1977 to 1988 (excluding economic crimes):

| Year | 1977 | 1978 | 1979 | 1980 | 1981 | 1982 | 1983 | 1984 | 1985 | 1986 | 1987 | 1988 |
|---|---|---|---|---|---|---|---|---|---|---|---|---|
| Total number of cases | 548,415 | 535,698 | 636,222 | 757,104 | 890,281 | 748,476 | 610,478 | 514,369 | 542,005 | 547,115 | 570,439 | 827,706 |
| Incidents of criminal case per 10,000 people | 5.8 | 5.6 | 6.6 | 7.7 | 8.9 | 7.4 | 6.0 | 5.0 | 5.2 | 5.2 | 5.4 | 7.5 |

Crime by youth increased rapidly in the 1980s. Crime by youths comprised 60.2% of total crime in 1983, 63.3% in 1984, 71.4% in 1985, 72.4% in 1986, and 74.3% in 1987. The number of fleeing criminals increased over the years. Economic crimes have increased in recent years. From 1982 to 1988, the total number of economic crimes were 218,000.

The 1983 Strike Hard Against Crime Campaign mobilized the then-recently restored political and legal apparatus to crack down on rising crime.

In 1989, a total of 76,758 cases of economic offenses were registered, which included bribery, smuggling, and tax evasion. The changes in economic policy had an influence on the characteristics of criminality. Since the second plenary session of the eleventh Central Committee of the Chinese Communist Party, crime has increased and diversified.

Bo Xilai, the Chinese Communist Party Committee Secretary of Chongqing, imitated the Smash Black campaign against organized crime in 2009. The government's 2018 Sweep Black campaign targeted organized crime.

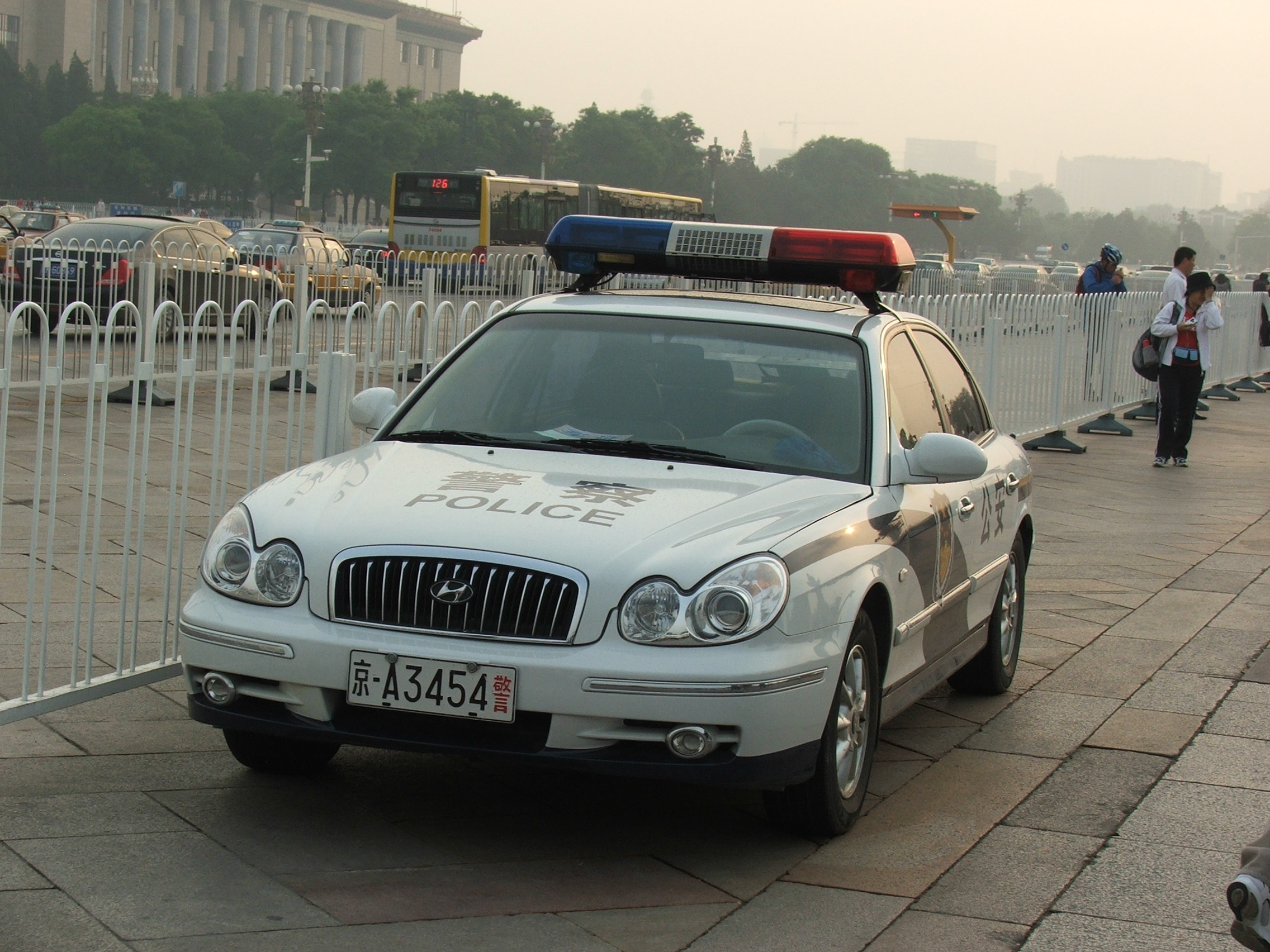
Chinese police vehicle in Beijing.

== Crime by type ==
=== Murder ===
In 2011, the reported murder rate in China was 1.0 per 100,000 people, with 13,410 murders. The murder rate in 2018 was 0.5. The reported murder rates have been criticized for under-reporting unsolved murders due to police salaries being based on the rate of solved cases.

=== Corruption ===
Corruption exists in China. Between 1978 and 2003, an estimated $50 billion was smuggled out of the country by corrupt officials.

=== Human trafficking ===
There are instances of human trafficking reported in China for various purposes. The majority of trafficking in PRC is internal, and this domestic trafficking is the most significant human trafficking problem in the country.

Domestic and transnational criminal organizations carry out sex trafficking in China. Women are lured through false promises of legitimate employment into commercial sexual exploitation in Taiwan, Thailand, Malaysia, Pakistan, and Japan. Chinese men are smuggled to countries throughout the world for exploitative labor. Women and children are trafficked into PRC from Mongolia, Burma, North Korea, Russia, and Vietnam for forced labor and sexual slavery.

=== Drug trade ===
PRC is a major transshipment point for heroin produced in the Golden Triangle. Growing domestic drug abuse is a significant problem in PRC. Available estimates place the domestic spending on illegal drugs to be $17 billion.

=== Domestic violence ===
China has a high rate of domestic violence. In 2004, the All-China Women’s Federation compiled survey results to show that thirty percent of the women in China experienced domestic violence within their homes.

In 2015, the Chinese government enacted the Anti-domestic Violence Law.

== Crime dynamics ==
=== Illegal guns ===
From January to July 1996, approximately 300,000 illegal small arms were seized from fourteen provinces of the country.

== Organized crime in mainland China ==
China has a significant level of organized criminal activity across various sectors. The country is both a source and destination for human trafficking, involving forced labor and sexual exploitation. Smuggling networks often exploit economic ambitions, with Chinese nationals being trafficked abroad under false pretenses. China is a major player in the global synthetic drug market and an important transit hub for heroin and cocaine, though it has seen a decline in domestic heroin consumption. China remains the world’s largest producer of counterfeit goods, which are facilitated by e-commerce platforms. Despite efforts to curb this, the trade remains pervasive. Illegal logging, wildlife trafficking, and mining are critical issues, driven by demand for rare resources like timber and minerals. Financial fraud, money laundering, and cybercrime are significant and growing concerns, with criminal organizations adopting sophisticated digital tools to evade detection.

Criminal networks operate often in collaboration with foreign actors. While mafia-style groups are relatively small and non-violent in mainland China, corruption within state structures further enables organized crime.

Despite a relatively strong law enforcement framework, China’s efforts to combat organized crime are undermined by corruption, lack of judicial independence, and human rights abuses. While the state has shown resolve in addressing crime, its anti-corruption campaigns are seen as politically motivated, and civil society remains restricted.

== See also ==
- Crime in Hong Kong
- Law enforcement in China
- List of Chinese criminal organizations
- Prostitution in China
- Terrorism in China
- List of rampage killers in China
- List of school attacks in China
