= Human trafficking in Hong Kong =

The Hong Kong Special Administrative Region (HKSAR) of the People's Republic of China is a destination and transit territory for men and women trafficked for the purposes of commercial sexual exploitation and forced labour.

Hong Kong is primarily a transit point for illegal migrants, some of whom are subject to conditions of debt bondage, sexual exploitation, and forced labour. To a lesser extent, Hong Kong is a destination for women from mainland China and Southeast Asia who travel to Hong Kong voluntarily for legal employment in restaurants, bars, and hotels, but upon arrival are coerced into prostitution under conditions of debt bondage. Domestic and transnational criminal organizations carry out sex trafficking in China, including Hong Kong. Many mainland Chinese prostitutes in Hong Kong are reportedly sexually trafficked victims. Although Hong Kong continues efforts to regulate the thousands of foreign domestic workers from the Philippines and Indonesia currently working in Hong Kong, there appears to be a growing number of Indonesian workers who are subject to exploitation and conditions of involuntary servitude. Many Indonesian domestic workers earning the minimum wage are required to repay to their Indonesian recruitment agency $2,700 within their first seven months of employment, amounting to roughly 90 percent of a worker's monthly salary. Such high levels of indebtedness assumed as part of the terms of employment can lead to situations of debt bondage, when unlawfully exploited by recruiters or employers. Additionally, the confiscation of passports by some Hong Kong employment agencies restricts the ability of migrant workers to leave their employer in cases of abuse, and places them under further control of their employment agency, leaving them vulnerable to trafficking.

The U.S. State Department's Office to Monitor and Combat Trafficking in Persons placed the region in "Tier 2 Watchlist" in 2020. In 2023 the US report noted that Hong Kong was at Tier 2, while China was one of eleven countries which were seen as having a documented government policy or pattern of human trafficking.

As of mid-2024, China has not ratified the 2000 UN TIP Protocol.

== Sex trafficking ==
Sex trafficking in Hong Kong is an issue. Hongkonger and foreign women and girls are forced into prostitution in brothels, homes, and businesses in the city.

== Prosecution (2008) ==
Hong Kong does not have specific anti-trafficking laws, but uses its Immigration Ordinance, the Crimes Ordinance, and other relevant laws to prohibit trafficking offenses. Labour trafficking is criminalized through the Employment Ordinance. Penalties for commercial sexual exploitation are commensurate with those for rape; however, penalties for trafficking are less stringent. During 2008, the Hong Kong government reported two trafficking convictions, and two other reports of trafficking for the purposes of prostitution with insufficient evidence to warrant prosecution. The convictions involved six Filipina victims who were told that they would work as Hong Kong club entertainers. Upon arrival in Hong Kong, they were forced into prostitution. The victims sought assistance from the Philippine Consulate, and the Hong Kong Police worked closely with the Philippine Government to investigate, prosecute, and convict two Filipina traffickers, who were sentenced to three years’ imprisonment. Hong Kong law stipulates that the commission a domestic worker recruitment agency deducts from a domestic worker's pay cannot exceed 10 percent of the first month's wages and prohibits agencies from charging additional fees or rewards. However, it is reported that this regulation is frequently subject to abuse.

== Protection (2008) ==
The government encourages victim participation in the investigation of traffickers, although in practice many are reluctant to do so. Women who agree to act as witnesses for the prosecution are granted immunity and allowed to return to their home country without being charged for illegal entry or breach of condition of stay. The Hong Kong Police has special units to provide protection for victims and witnesses. Given the low number of documented trafficking victims, Hong Kong authorities refer adult victims to existing social service programs at six government subsidized NGO shelters. Under the Protection of Children and Juveniles Ordinance, child victims of trafficking may be admitted to three refuge centers, one of which is operated by an NGO, with the other two operated by the Social Welfare Department. While at the shelters, victims are provided with government-sponsored assistance that includes financial and legal assistance and counseling and psychological support.

== Prevention (2008) ==
To prevent trafficking among foreign domestic workers, the Labour Department continued to publish “guidebooks” in several languages that explain workers’ rights, the role of employment agencies, and services provided by the government. These guidebooks are handed out when workers apply for identity documents, and are distributed at strategic locations around the city, including the airport, district offices, consulates, offices of labour and migrant groups, post offices, and banks. Short “publicity messages” promoting the employment rights and benefits of foreign domestic workers are advertised in local newspapers (in various languages) and on television. The Immigration Department also delivered a talk for over 100 employment agencies of foreign domestic workers to discuss relevant provisions of the Immigration Ordinance and related offenses, as well as cautionary notes for arranging foreign domestic helper employment in Hong Kong. The Hong Kong government did not take any specific measures to reduce the demand for commercial sex acts during the year.
