= Sexual slavery in China =

Sexual slavery in China is sexual exploitation and slavery that occurs in the People's Republic of China.

== Background ==
Chinese citizen and foreign victims, primarily women and girls, are unlawfully kept in a situation in which they are raped and physically and psychologically harmed in other ways. A number contract sexually transmitted diseases, and abused, beaten, and starved. Some women and girls are tortured and or murdered. Others commit suicide.

Victims are forced into prostitution, marriages, and or pregnancies. Many are kept tied or locked up in homes, brothels, or indirect sex establishments, such as beer gardens, massage parlors, salons, karaoke bars, retail spaces, and non-commercial sites. Other locations include construction sites, remote mining and logging camps, and areas with high concentrations of Chinese migrant workers. Victims have been subjected to penetrative vaginal and anal rape, groping, and forced masturbation in illegal, cybersex trafficking 'online rape dens' used for digital and live pornographic video sharing in the twenty-first century. Gang rape occurs in these dens as well. Traffickers sell these videos and earn revenue by adding them to pornography websites. Due to the shortage of women in China, young women are being trafficked into the country as brides and raped until they become pregnant.

Victims are enslaved by people they know and or perpetrators of sex trafficking in China. The perpetrators come from a wide range of backgrounds and every social class and include, but are not limited to, family members, friends, classmates, colleagues, acquaintances, traffickers, and criminal organization members. They target children, impoverished persons, migrants, disabled persons, ethnic and religious minorities, and foreigners. The victims are coerced and threatened so they are more compliant. Some are drugged.

The extent of sexual slavery in China cannot be known because the lack of data, surreptitious nature of sexual slavery crimes, the fact that only a small minority of cases are reported to the authorities, and other factors. The Chinese government has done some work to combat sexual slavery, but responses have proved insufficient. The enforcement of laws and investigating and prosecuting of sexual slavery cases have been immobilized by interagency miscommunication, inadequate border management, language barriers of foreign victims, corruption, and apathy.

== See also ==
- Sex trafficking in China
- Cybersex trafficking
