= Kris Wu rape case =

2021–2022 criminal case in China

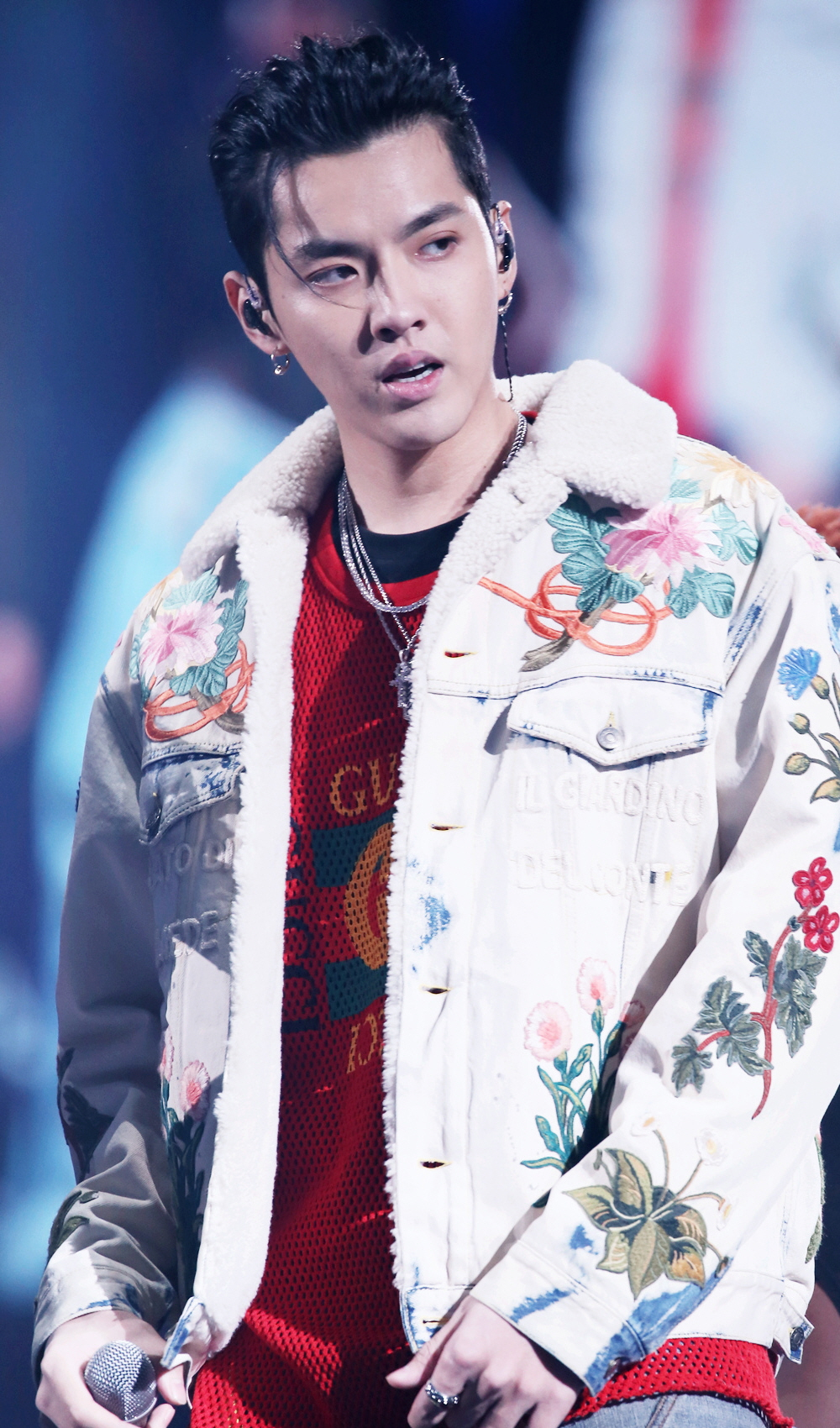
- Wu in 2017
- Date: July 8, 2021 – November 25, 2022
- Location: China
- Type: Rape
- Target: Du Meizhu (Note: Chinese: 都美竹) and two other female victims
- Outcome: Wu's arrest, conviction of two crimes, and sentencing to 13 years imprisonment for the first crime and 1 year 10 months for the second crime. Fixed imprisonment term of 13 years. And deportation; Losses of sponsorships for Wu; Removal of Wu's works and social media accounts from the Chinese market; Deportation expected after prison sentence completion

In 2022, Canadian rapper Kris Wu was convicted of rape and group sex in China, in a high-profile case that emerged at the height of his career.

In June 2021, following the revelation of Wu's date with Chen Ziyi, a student, internet influencer Du Meizhu, through her friends, accused Wu of infidelity during their relationship from December 2020 to April 2021, when he ghosted her. In July, Du accused Wu of raping her and other women, including two minors. Wu denied the accusations at the time. On July 31, 2021, Wu was detained by the Beijing police on suspicion of rape. On November 25, 2022, Wu was convicted by the Beijing Chaoyang District Court on two charges: raping "three drunken women" in his home in the months of November and December 2020, and having group sex, which is illegal in China, on July 1, 2018. The court imposed a fixed term of 13 years after considerations of 11.5 years in prison for the first charge, and one year and ten months for the second charge, to be followed by deportation from China. He was also fined CN¥600 million (approximately US$84 million for tax evasion. Wu appealed in court. On November 24, 2023, the appeal was rejected.

== Background ==
Wu Yi Fan, known professionally as Kris Wu, was born in China in 1990. He migrated to Vancouver, Canada at 10 with his mother after his parents divorced. After a brief return to China, Wu stayed in Canada until his late teenage years. In 2007, he took part in SM Entertainment's global auditions held in Vancouver. He was selected as a trainee and travelled in 2008 to Seoul, where he received training for four years.

Wu debuted with Exo in 2012 but left the group in 2014 to become a solo artist focused on music and acting in China. He starred in several Chinese films and became a spokesperson for international brands including Louis Vuitton and Porsche.

== Allegations ==
On July 8, 2021, Du Meizhu, an internet influencer, accused Wu of sexual misconduct in a post on Weibo. She accused Wu of sexually assaulting her when she was 17 and a student in the vocational program at the Communication University of China. She also uploaded screenshots of messages from alleged victims who have said they were lured into playing drinking games and spending the night with Wu.

Wu's agency denied the accusations and said the screenshots were faked. It said it would file a police report and a defamation suit against Du. The police initially dismissed the accusations and said Du was a fame-seeker.

Du then claimed that she was paid hush money by Wu's agency but then decided to speak out two years later. Du also included in another post that there were more instances of Wu getting women drunk and then raping them. She later said that she was not the first nor the last victim, after more women (including two minors) reached out to her to share similar experiences of being lured by Wu.

On August 8, 2021, an alleged underage victim from Los Angeles shared her story of attending one of Wu's drinking parties. She told her lawyer, "It's an open secret that he [Wu] selects concubines among international students." She allegedly saw this first-hand when Wu's assistant invited her to a gathering, where the girls had to turn in their phones beforehand to prevent photos and videos from being recorded.

Below are some of the accusations from Du's Weibo posts:

1. Wu never took any safety precautions when he raped the girls.
2. Wu would frequently bring young and pretty fan-girls to what he claimed to be a mini fan convention and tell them that more fans were coming. The site of the "convention" would turn out to be a hotel, and when the girls reached their destination they would realize that they were alone in a room with Wu.
3. Du received a total of CNY 500 thousand (approximately US$78 thousand) as hush money. Du provided a video of the transaction and said that she was in the process of returning the money.
4. Du had been invited to Wu's home under the pretence of a work opportunity. She was pressured to drink alcohol and later awoke naked on his bed, discovering she had been raped.
5. Wu had a sexually transmitted infection and had infected some of the girls. Some of the girls were also impregnated by him and had abortions.
6. Seven other women told Du that Wu had raped them after applying the same method he had used on Du, promising jobs and other opportunities.

After Du was interviewed by NetEase, a major news portal, her allegations gained further attention.

On his personal Weibo account, Wu denied supplying Du with alcohol, enticing girls to have sex with him in return for benefits, raping them while they were unconscious, or having sex with minors.

== Investigation ==
According to a statement released by Beijing Chaoyang Police dated July 21, 2021, using the reason of selecting a female lead for an upcoming music video, Kris Wu's manager arranged for Du Meizhu to attend a party on December 5, 2020, at about 11 p.m. with ten other people. The party wore on to 7 am the following day with the participants playing table games and drinking alcoholic beverages. When the party ended, among the guests, only Du remained in Wu's house. Du and Wu then engaged in sexual activity. Thereafter Du had her lunch at Wu's house before exchanging her contact details with him and leaving in the afternoon. On December 8, 2020, Wu transferred CN¥32,000 to her account. In June 2021, after discussing with her friend, surnamed Liu, Du posted about Wu's way of picking up girls to gain popularity online. Liu then used a Weibo account to accuse Wu of raping Du. Between July 8 and 11, Du published three more posts. On July 13, an online writer, surnamed Xu, wanting to gain some reputation, reached out to Du. Following a discussion between them, he wrote ten articles posted successively since July 16 under Du's Weibo account. The police started the investigations in response to online allegations, while had yet to receive any police reports from the purported victims.

On July 18, 2021, Liu Tiaotiao (刘迢迢), a hairstylist, was arrested in Nantong, Jiangsu after he tried to cheat money from Wu's mother and Du by pretending to be involved parties. Liu first pretended to be a female on WeChat to gain information from Du, which was then used to demand CN¥3 million from Wu's lawyer in the form of a settlement. He also pretend to be Wu's lawyer in order to negotiate with Du for a settlement. On July 11, Wu's mother transferred CN¥500,000 to Du's bank account. Liu Tiaotiao then tried to extract the remaining CN¥2.5 million from Wu's lawyer while impersonating Du. Liu Tiaotiao would also impersonate Wu's lawyer to have Du sign a settlement agreement or otherwise return the CN¥500,000, indicating his own bank account as the destination. Du would transfer CN¥180,000 to Liu Tiaotiao's account. On July 22, 2021, a netizen by the name of Wushiyanghao (乌市杨昊) who claimed himself a neighbour of Du Meizhu in Inner Mongolia was arrested by the Ulanhot Police on the charge of defamation.

On July 31, 2021, Wu was detained by the Beijing Chaoyang District police on suspicion of rape after allegedly "repeatedly seducing young women into having sex". After the detainment, various government media outlets such as the publications People's Daily and Legal Daily, and broadcaster CCTV sought to drive the message that foreign citizenship or fame are not protections against the Chinese judiciary system.

145 Weibo accounts were closed in August 2021 by the platform for publishing harmful information related to current affairs, defined as anything from "spreading rumors, disrupting state order and undermining social stability" to "publishing negative information that breaks the bottom line of social morality and the system." Some of these accounts were defending Wu over the rape allegations. On August 16, 2021, Kris Wu was formally arrested over allegations of rape.

== Trials ==
On June 10, 2022, Chaoyang District People's Court tried the case behind closed doors. The trial was not made public to protect the privacy of the victims involved. On November 25, 2022, the court reached a verdict. Kris Wu was convicted of raping three drunken women in his home between the months of November and December 2020. The court imposed a sentence of 11 years 10 months for this charge. The second charge was what Reuters described as "assembling a crowd to engage in sexual promiscuity" with two women in his home on July 1, 2018. The prison sentence of the second charge was one year and 10 months, followed by deportation from China. At the same time, a fine of CN¥600 million for the tax evasion was imposed as well.

On July 25, 2023, the appeal trial was held at the Third Intermediate People's Court of Beijing. The trial was held in private to protect the privacy of the victims involved. The Canadian embassy was notified in advance, but its request to attend the appeal trial was denied by the Chinese authorities. The appeal was rejected on November 24, 2023, in the presence of Wu, his close relatives, and officials from the Canadian embassy. The court found that the evidence presented in the original trial was reliable and sufficient and that the application of law and his conviction were correct and legal.

== Fallout ==
=== Judiciary ===
Wu's arrest came shortly after government body overseeing performing arts issued a new set of regulatory guidelines to regulate the behaviour of performers and celebrities, which require that they "love the motherland" and create art that "serves the people and socialism".

=== Erasure ===
On the evening of August 1, 2021, QQ Music and NetEase Music removed all of Kris Wu's music from the shelves. The official Weibo account of big-budget costume drama The Golden Hairpin, which stars Wu, deleted all posts related to him, leaving only a poster featuring the show's supporting characters. The Golden Hairpin, produced by Tencent Video, is Wu's first TV drama. Wu's account on the short video platform Douyin was also blocked and its followers have been removed, and his Weibo profile has been taken down due to "Complaints in violating the rules and regulations of Weibo's Community Convention".

=== Brands ===
Numerous companies have followed suit in severing ties to Wu: brand endorsement deals were ended; social media posts that featured him were removed, and he was later blacklisted by several networks. Below is a non-exhaustive list of entities that have either condemned Wu or disassociated themselves from him:

- Bulgari
- Bestore
- China Media Group
- Ethereal Sound
- Honor of Kings
- KANS Cosmetics
- Kiehl's
- Lancôme
- Liby Detergent
- Louis Vuitton
- L'Oréal Men
- Master Kong Iced Tea
- Porsche
- Seeyoung Haircare
- Tempo
- Tencent
- Tuborg Beer
- Vatti

== Prior relevant laws and regulations in Mainland China ==
=== Ban of "notorious" artists ===
In September 2014, the National Radio and Television Administration issued the "Notice of the National Radio and Television Administration Office on Strengthening the Management of the Production and Distribution of Radio and Television Programs, Film and TV Dramas, and Online Audio-visual Programs". Artists listed in this order are called "notorious" and could face permanent boycott from the industry.

=== Relevant laws and regulations ===
According to Article 236 of the Criminal Law of the People's Republic of China, the crime of rape refers to the act of using violence, coercion or other means against a woman's will to forcibly have sexual intercourse with her, or deliberately have sexual intercourse with a girl under the age of fourteen. Anyone who rapes a woman by violence, coercion or other means shall be sentenced to fixed-term imprisonment of no less than three years but no more than ten years. Whoever commits adultery with a girl under the age of fourteen shall be punished as severely as rape, up to the death penalty. Anyone who commits a joint offence by two or more persons shall be sentenced to fixed-term imprisonment of more than ten years, life imprisonment or a death sentence. In addition, according to the territorial principle, if the crime occurred in China, the same sentences apply regardless of the nationality of the offender.

Because Wu is a Canadian citizen, a conviction by the judiciary of China makes him eligible for deportation from China, since according to Article 35 of the Criminal Law of the People's Republic of China, foreigners who commit crimes can face deportation. Some publications pointed out that the Chinese-American lawyer Bao Yuming, who was previously convicted of "violating social ethics and public order and good customs" in his sexual assault case, was deported.

== See also ==
- Edison Chen photo scandal
- Harvey Weinstein sexual abuse cases
- MeToo movement in China
- Ages of consent in Asia § Mainland China
