= Sex trafficking in China =

The People's Republic of China (PRC) is a country of origin, destination, and transit for human trafficking for the purpose of sexual exploitation and slavery.

Sex trafficking victims in the country are from all ethnic groups in China and foreigners. Chinese citizens have been sex trafficked to the various provinces of China, as well as other countries and different continents. Illegal organizations often lure Chinese women abroad under the guise of legitimate work in other countries. Once these women arrive in that country, they are forced into prostitution and commercial sexual exploitation. Some of the women trafficked from China to Thailand and Malaysia are from ethnic minorities like the Dai ethnicity from areas like the Xishuangbanna Dai Autonomous Prefecture in Yunnan province and they are trafficked by men of their own ethnicity. The Dai people are related to Thai people. Chinese women and girls are trafficked for the purpose of prostitution worldwide and are found in major cities abroad, construction sites, and places where Chinese laborers are present. They have been detected in overseas Chinese expatriate communities. China's internal migrant population, in the hundreds of millions, is particularly vulnerable to sex trafficking. Sex trafficked victims are abducted or deceived and forced into prostitution, marriages, and or pregnancies. They are threatened, physically and psychologically harmed. They contract sexually transmitted diseases from rapes, and abuses such as starvation are common. Some women and girls die from the poor conditions in captivity or are tortured or murdered. Foreign women and children mostly from Burma, Mongolia, North Korea, Russia, and Vietnam are trafficked to China for forced labor, marriage, and prostitution. Most of them are from vulnerable communities. Women and girls from northern Myanmar to China are sold from about $3,000 to $13,000 to Chinese families struggling to find brides for their sons. Experts relate China's serious sex trafficking with the country's one-child policy. They argue that the imbalance in the ratio of male to female births and the scarcity of women resulting from the policy has greatly contributed to the phenomenon of trafficking in women as brides.

Sex trafficking and exploitation have permeated all levels of Chinese society. Male and female perpetrators in China come from a wide range of backgrounds and every social class. A number of traffickers are members of facilitated criminal organizations and gangs. Some government officials and workers, as well as foreigners, have profited from sex trafficking in China. Rising incomes in China have spurred increased consumption of many services, both licit and illicit. It has occurred in businesses linked to China's entertainment and tourism industries, as well as heavy industries and the mining sector. Some reporters suggest that the Belt and Road Initiative and globalization have led to an increase in sex trafficking in China. Chinese sex traffickers operate throughout the world. Cybersex trafficking is a growing problem in 21st century China. The global spread of high-speed internet and increase in computer, tablet, and smartphone ownership have fueled online or virtual forced prostitution and sex abuse and the creation of illegal pornographic videos purchased by users worldwide.

The scale of sex trafficking in China is difficult to know because of the lack of primary research and data collection, the clandestine nature of sex trafficking crimes, the fact that only a small minority of cases are reported to the authorities, and other factors. Chinese government ministries, as well as international and domestic agencies and organisations, do some work to combat sex trafficking patterns, but this has not brought substantive improvements and responses have proved insufficient. The enforcement of sex trafficking laws and investigating and prosecuting of trafficking cases have been immobilized by interagency collaboration and coordination challenges, logistical difficulties, poor border management, language barriers of foreign victims, political dynamics, corruption, and apathy. Some Chinese police and officials, as well as overseas embassies and diplomatic missions, have been accused of negligence concerning counter-sex trafficking efforts and concern for victims. Available statistics indicate that China needs to devote greater resources and implement better policies and strategies designed to reduce sex trafficking in the country. It is difficult for trading partners of China to criticize the country's inadequate anti-sex trafficking efforts because of fears of tensions. Chinese civil society's efforts in countering sex trafficking are stymied by threats and coercion from criminal organizations and officials and the government's repression of women and human rights organizations, presses, and lawyers.

== Victims ==
Chinese citizen and foreign victims are sex trafficked into and out of all provinces of China. They are raped and physically and psychologically harmed in other ways in homes, brothels, indirect sex establishments, and various business and work sites within these administrative divisions.

Victims of sex trafficking for sexual slavery in China include children, adults, impoverished, migrants, disabled persons, ethnic and religious minorities, foreigners, and overseas Chinese. It is not uncommon for victims of rape to be used additionally as forced laborers in homes, farms, and businesses. They, particularly forced prostitutes, often contract sexually transmitted diseases because the clients/rapists often do not use contraceptive methods. Women and girls have contracted HIV. A number of them are verbally and physically abused and beaten, starved, drugged, and sexually tortured.

It is estimated that between 10,000 and 20,000 victims are trafficked within the China each year. Chinese police rescued 88,000 trafficked women from 1991 to 1996; they freed more than 42,000 kidnapped women and children from 2001 to 2003. However, due to the concealment of crime, it is hard to determine how many women are still being enslaved in China. Many sex-trafficked women and girls are never found.

Surviving victims face ostracisation from their families and communities. Some victims are discouraged by family and friends from seeking justice. Some in extreme poverty or suffering from trauma or forced drug addiction because of their captors reluctantly return to prostitution after being rescued. Many mothers who flee or are rescued will never be able to see their children held by the buying family or sold by the traffickers. Some former trafficking victims are reluctant to report traffickers to the local authorities because they fear reprisal from criminals. Some rescued victims get abducted and sex trafficked again.

Trafficking survivors may need urgent medical care for problems ranging from injuries due to sexual abuse and torture. They need legal assistance to ensure that the justice system - which too often lets trafficking victims down - is responsive to their needs for accountability and compensation. Many need financial assistance as months and years of sexual slavery resulted in no education and income.

The Chinese government's protection of victims has been criticized: Chinese law enforcement officials have arrested and detained foreign women on suspicion of prostitution crimes without screening them for indicators of sexual exploitation—sometimes for as long as four months, before deporting them for immigration violations. The police have treated the women and girls as violators of immigration law but have taken little action against their traffickers.

There is a need for greater rehabilitative assistance and protection services, including comprehensive counseling and medical reintegration of the victims. In many cases, detained or imprisoned women were beaten by other inmates.

The Chinese government maintains a wide network of shelters across the country, providing food, accommodation, and other services to Chinese citizens facing various kinds of challenges. The system, however, is inexperienced in supporting foreigners in need of help. Anecdotal evidence suggests that non-Chinese women escaping conditions of forced marriage, some pregnant are at times not granted access to shelters and their services. Special support services exist for children, including specialized shelters. Emergency shelters, physical and mental health services, education, job training, financial assistance, and family reunification are available for all groups.

=== Females ===
Females are more vulnerable than males because of entrenched misogyny that causes men to view women and girls as inferior and commoditize them. Traditional patriarchal structures reinforce gender inequality, especially in rural areas where females are oftentimes not afforded the same opportunities as males and are forced to submit to male authority. This inequality leaves women and girls increasingly marginalized and vulnerable to sex trafficking.

The one-child policy and preference for sons over daughters have led to a skewed sex ratio in which men outnumber women in China. Consequently, there is an increased demand for trafficked prostitutes and wives in China. For years it was easy for China to ignore the issue of sex trafficking. Now China is running a cruel business of selling women and girls from neighboring countries. Trafficked women and girls are often from ethnic or religious minorities, poor communities, violence against women and girls is often a low priority for governments.

=== Children ===
Children have been targeted by perpetrators. Those from rural areas and migrant students, as well as left-behind children whose parents have migrated to the cities and other countries, have been identified as a vulnerable population to sex trafficking. Children who are illegally adopted are vulnerable to sexual exploitation.

=== People in poverty ===
Sex traffickers in China often abduct or purchase women and girls from families in poverty or facing financial crisis, particularly the rural poor, because the victims often do not have any political power and connections and lack education about sex trafficking laws, which enables the captors to not attract much attention or publicity.

=== Migrants ===
The hukou household registration system in China has contributed to the vulnerability of internal migrants by limiting employment opportunities and reducing access to social services, particularly for Chinese victims returning from exploitation abroad.

=== Disabled persons ===
Disabled persons, including those with mental illness or who are deaf and mute, have been trafficked in and out of China by perpetrators. Traffickers target adults and children with disabilities whose parents have left them with relatives to migrate to the cities.

=== Ethnic and religious minorities ===
Women and girls from minority groups are at an increased risk of sex trafficking because of population displacements and a lack of political representation, power, and protection.

=== History of trafficking to China ===
Vietnamese women and girls were mass trafficked from Vietnam to China during French colonial rule by Chinese and Vietnamese pirates and agencies. Mung, Meo, Thai, and Nùng were the minority section of women belonging to Tonkin mountain region who were kidnapped by pirates . The anti-French Can Vuong rebels were the source of the Vietnamese bandits, while former Taiping rebels were the source of the Chinese rebels. These Vietnamese and Chinese pirates fought against the French colonial military and to gain monetary benefit they started trading women.

France Captain Louis de Louis de Grandmaison claimed that these Vietnamese women did not want to go back to Vietnam, and they had families in China and were better off in China. Vietnamese women were in demand because of a lower number of Chinese women available in China. Vietnamese women in the Red River delta were taken to China by Chinese recruitment agencies, as well as Vietnamese women who were kidnapped from villages which were raided by Vietnamese and Chinese pirates. The Vietnamese women became wives, prostitutes, or slaves.

Vietnamese women were viewed in China as "inured to hardship, resigned to their fate, and in addition of very gentle character" so they were in demand as concubines and servants. The massive traffick of Tongkinese (North Vietnamese) women to China started in 1875. Southern Chinese ports were the destination of the children and women who were kidnapped by Chinese pirates from the area around Haiphong in Vietnam. Children and pretty women were taken by the pirates in their raids on Vietnamese villages.

Brothels in Bangkok bought kidnapped Vietnamese boat ladies fleeing South Vietnam after the Vietnam war who were taken by pirates.

=== Foreigners ===
Foreign women and girls from Russia, Vietnam, Mongolia, North Korea Myanmar, Kenya, Rwanda, Uganda Thailand, Malaysia, Cambodia, Laos, Philippines, Indonesia, and other countries have been trafficked into China for sexual exploitation. They experience difficulties being rescued because they do not speak Chinese and have no identification documents.

The United Nations Human Rights Council 'Report of the commission of inquiry on human rights in the Democratic People's Republic of Korea' (February 2014) stated that a number of North Korean women in China were trafficked and sexually exploited. North Korean women's customers (or "husbands") are Han Chinese men and ethnic Korean-Chinese men. Authorities continue to detain and deport North Korean sexually trafficked victims who may face severe punishment or death upon their repatiration. The majority of North Korean refugees leaving the DPRK are women. The Chinese government's refusal to recognize these women as refugees denies them legal protection and may encourage the trafficking of North Korean women and girls within China. Many children born to Chinese fathers and North Korean mothers remain deprived of basic rights to education and other public services, owing to their lack of legal resident status in China, which constitute violations of the PRC Nationality Law and the convention on the Rights of the Child.

=== History of trafficking via or from China ===
Japan exported prostitutes called Karayuki-san during the Meiji and Taisho periods to China, Canada, the United States, Australia, French Indochina, British Malaya, British Borneo, British India and British East Africa where they served western soldiers and Chinese coolies.

Japanese girls were easily trafficked abroad to and via China since Chinese ports did not require Japanese citizens to use passports and the Japanese government realized that money earned by the karayuki-san helped the Japanese economy since it was being remitted, and the Chinese boycott of Japanese products in 1919 led to reliance on revenue from the karayuki-san. Japanese girls and women worked as Karayuki-san prostitutes in the west coast of the United States and provided sexual services to Chinese men, white men and Japanese men in America in the 19th and early 20th centuries since most Chinese immigrants at the time were male so the Chinese men were forced to use Japanese prostitutes for relations with women. Japanese prostitutes worked in the American west and also as barmaids. The Issei Japanese American Bunshiro Tazuma said "At the age of 18… I started… work as a dishwasher at a hotel in Spokane. Later I became a [railroad?] cook and went to North Dakota, South Dakota, Idaho, Oregon, Washington, and even as far as to Minnesota and Alaska… To my surprise I found at least two to six Japanese prostitutes in every town where I went between Seattle and St. Paul, a range of two thousand miles. Even when I went to Alaska to… a salmon cannery in 1908, I was surprised to see from two to five or six in such towns as Ketchikan, Juneau, Wrangell, Sitka, and Skagway.”

While Chinese prostitutes in British Malaya refused to service non-Chinese men, Japanese Karayuki-san prostitutes in British Malaya were open to non-Japanese men.

Chinese prostitutes in French Indochina also only served overseas Chinese men there unlike the Japanese Karayuki-san prostitutes who serviced non-Japanese men like the French.

In 2011, a brothel in Moscow with Chinese and Vietnamese prostitutes which served only Chinese male citizens as clients was uncovered, it advertised to its Chinese clients via coded messages in a Chinese language newspaper but was uncovered by the police.

Chinese women have been sex trafficked in Chinese owned Philippine Offshore Gaming Operators but they only serve Chinese male clients who visit or work at those Chinese owned offshore gaming operators according to the Philippines National Bureau of Investigation, the pimps and clients of the prostitutes being both Chinese men residing in the Philippines, not local Filipino men or other foreigners in the Philippines. Women from Vietnam, China and other countries have been sex trafficked to Manila during the Southeast Asian Games hosted in the Philippines in 2019.

== Forced prostitution ==
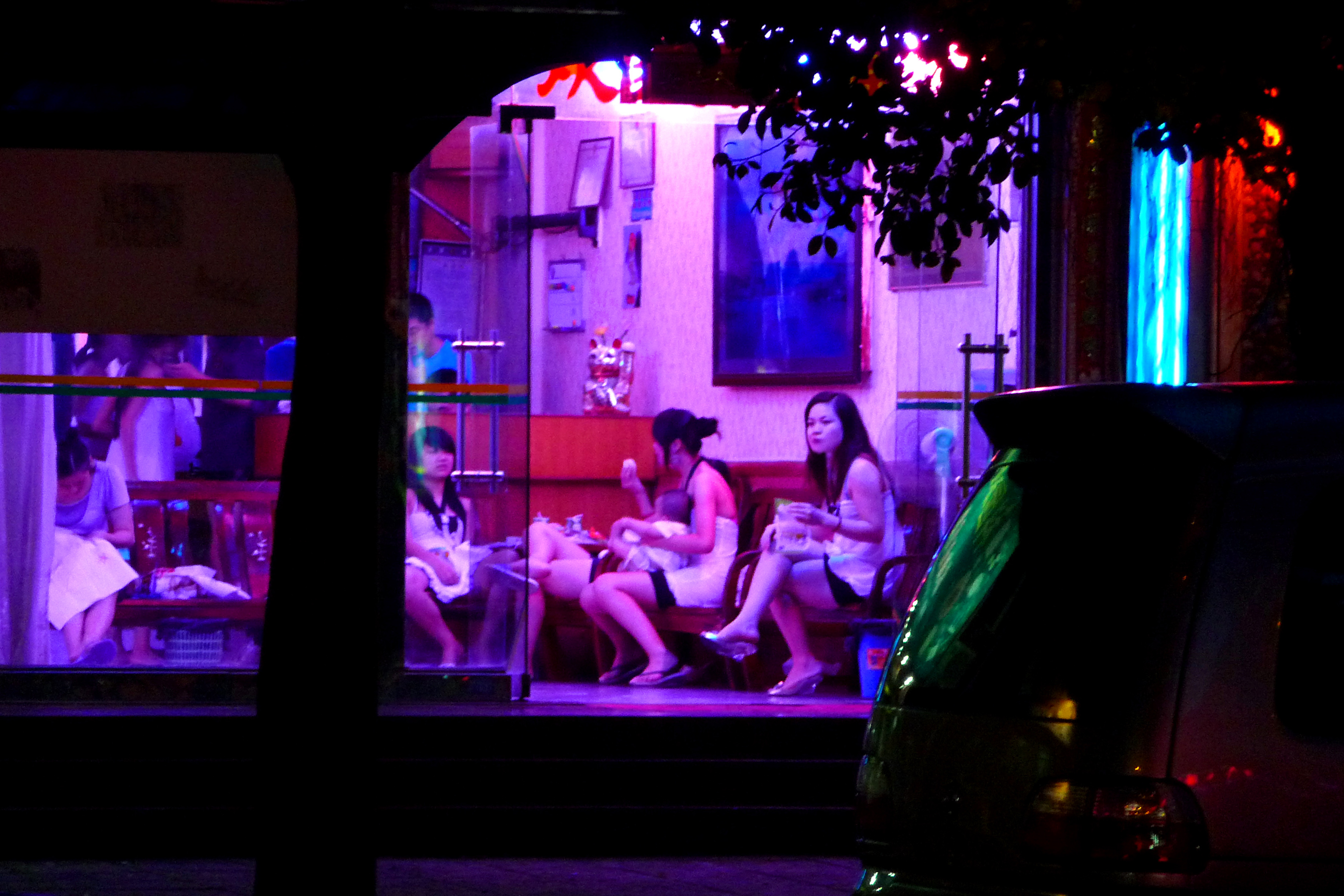
Chinese and foreign women and girls sex trafficked and forced into prostitution are raped in brothels and establishments similar to this one in South China. 'Online rape dens' in more inconspicuous premises are increasingly being used for digital and live pornographic video sharing in the twenty-first century.

Victims are coerced by perpetrators by imposing large travel fees, confiscating passports, confining victims, or are physically and financially threatened to compel their engagement in commercial sex. Victims are deceived by traffickers and brothel operators by answering ads for jobs as models, waitresses, servers, cleaners, and more. Some have been told they could study in universities and educational institutions at low costs only to be sold into prostitution. Some are drugged and abducted. The brothels are often indirect sex establishments, such as beer gardens, massage parlors, salons, karaoke bars, retail spaces, and non-commercial sites. Other locations include construction sites, remote mining and logging camps, and areas with high concentrations of Chinese migrant workers.

Women and girls who are trafficked into brothels are raped by hundreds of men. They are kept under strict surveillance. It is not uncommon for them to be guarded and tied or locked up and never allowed to go outside. Some are beaten and or contract sexually transmitted diseases. Others commit suicide.

There are more males than females in China because of the one-child policy and preference. This may have led to an increase in the demand for prostitution. China's business culture also involves frequenting entertainment venues, some of which have forced prostitutes.

=== Cybersex trafficking ===
A number of sexually trafficked victims in China, including North Korean migrants, are deceived or abducted and coerced into cybersex slavery. Cybersex organization's operators are ethnic Korean-Chinese and North Korean women's customers are Chinese men and South Korean men. They are habitually subjected to penetrative vaginal and anal rape, groping, and forced masturbation live on camera in 'online rape dens.' Gang rape occurs in these dens as well. Victims have been locked up, deprived of sleep, denied food, been forced to perform while sick, and contracted infectious diseases, such as tuberculosis. They are forced to follow the orders or commands of the paying consumers.

== Forced marriages and pregnancies ==
Illicit brokers increasingly facilitate the forced and fraudulent marriage, or bride trafficking, of Chinese women and foreigners to men in China and from abroad. These women are sexually exploited in the illegal marriages. The Chinese government's birth limitation policy and the cultural preference for sons have resulted in an uneven sex ratio, contributing substantially to the demand for brides from rural areas and outside of China. Many brokers are connected to matchmaking businesses.

Bride-trafficking or forced marriages in China is a serious problem that is caused by three things, lack of legal action, vulnerability, and over-population of male citizens. The first issue that causes bride-trafficking is the lack of legal action in China. The U.S. State Department Trafficking in Persons Report July 2022 found that, “The [Chinese] government decreased efforts to prevent trafficking” (U.S. Department of State 173). China reduced their activities to stop human trafficking from 2021 to 2022. This means China is not taking precautions to decline the trend of bride-trafficking. There is hardly any legal action taken to prevent human trafficking in China, let alone any legal action for those already entrapped in bride-trafficking. China strongly disregards refugees, especially those from North Korea and does not give refugees any legal status. This hampers bride-trafficking being reported because undocumented refugees are at risk of deportation. Another thing that prevents bride-trafficking being reported is because people know that the government will not do anything about the report. The lack of legal action and absence of concern that China has toward bride-trafficking is unsettling and only perpetuating the issue.

Vulnerability is the second matter that causes bride-trafficking in China. Most, if not all, of the women who are bride-trafficked are of a marginalized people group. They are the poor, the outsiders, the outcast, the refugee, and the trafficked. “Burmese women migrate to China for many reasons, including the pursuit of economic opportunities in China, flight from civil conflict in Burma or a combination of both. Women migrate to save their families from starvation, pay off debts or afford basic necessities” (Hackney). Women in bad situations go to China to find work and many end up trafficked. They are tricked by being told that they can live a better life in China when they do not in fact understand or are not fully informed that they will be sold as someone's bride. “The victims were lured with payments to the family and promises of a good life in China, but reported abuse, difficult living conditions, forced pregnancy, or forced prostitution once they reached China” (Afzal 1). Women in vulnerable situations are told that they live well in China by traffickers but end up in situations far worse. Vulnerability is a major factor in the business of bride-trafficking.

The third and biggest problem that leads to bride-trafficking in China is the over population of male citizens. China has been dealing with daughter deficit for decades. The huge gap in the male versus female population stems from China's old one child policy. “The one child policy, paired with the cultural preference for sons, has resulted in a skewed sex ratio in rural China and its impoverished regions” (Stöckl et al. 2). Males were more valued than females so females would be aborted, killed, or abandoned, leaving the country with not enough women to fill the demand of brides for the men. This led to the bride-trafficking industry. There is a demand for women and people decided to make a profit out of it. The one child policy is no longer in place, but the ramifications of it are long-lasting. In 2020 the Chinese government took a census and found that males comprised 51.24% of the population whereas females comprised 47.76% of the population (Zhang 2). The percentages may not make it look like there is much of a gender imbalance, but when you consider the population of China in 2020, 1411.78 million (Zhang 2), this means that as of 2020 there were around 49.13 million more men in China then women. That is a huge gap in the male and female population, creating the demand for women. Bride-trafficking in China is largely caused by China's gender imbalance.

Some female trafficking victims are raped so they become surrogate mothers and bear children. There are testimonies that women and girls have also been injected with sperm. Their children are kept by the captors, the paying husband, or sold to other families. Some husbands let other men, including their relatives, rape their trafficked wife. Some women and girls have been trafficked to entire families of men who are poor and pool their money together to buy one wife. Some women become pregnant unintentionally while being forced prostitutes.

== Industries ==
=== Entertainment and tourism industries ===
China's entertainment and tourism industries have developed rapidly with the country's economic growth. Victims are trafficked into businesses, including restaurants, bars, casinos, and nightclubs, linked to these industries.

=== Mining industry ===
Women and girls are trafficked to mining sector sites.

== Special administrative regions of China ==
Chinese mainlanders are sex trafficked into the special administrative regions of China. Women and girls within these administrative regions are also trafficked to other parts of the city or to mainland cities.

=== Hong Kong ===
Mainland Chinese women and girls are sex trafficked into Hong Kong. They are forced into prostitution in brothels, homes, and businesses in the city.

According to the Global Slavery Index, the Hong Kong Special Administrative Region of the People's Republic of China has a 'weak response' to modern slavery, including sexual slavery, relative to gross domestic product based on purchasing power parity.

=== Macau ===
Mainland Chinese victims are sex trafficked into Macau. They are sex slaves in brothels and hotel rooms near the casinos and other entertainment venues.

== China–Mongolia border ==
Chinese and Mongolian women and girls are sex trafficked to and through the China–Mongolia border. At the border and in the Gobi Desert are global mining sector and other heavy industry operations with large workforces of isolated men. These sites, including the ones in Tavan Tolgoi coal deposits, have been a focal point for prostitution and sex trafficking.

== Criminal organizations and perpetrators ==
Domestic and transnational criminal organizations operating in China are becoming more organized, professional, and diverse. Members of criminal organizations use fraudulent employment offers, threats, direct force, and kidnapping to trafficked victims into sexual exploitation and slavery. Some marriage brokers, matchmakers, mail-order bride service managers, and loan sharks obtain women for criminal organizations. Traffickers frequently take advantage of debt bondage to control their victims. They also threaten families back home to ensure the victims continue to cooperate.

Chinese government officials and businessmen, facilitated by criminal organizations, have been arrested for participating in forcible commercial sexual exploitation. There are government officials who facilitate or are complicit in sex trafficking.

Females perpetrators are sometimes victims of trafficking themselves and are coerced to abduct more women and girls for their captors. Female traffickers can better conceal their identities to the police and win trust from victims more easily compared with their male counterparts.

Family members, relatives, friends, classmates, colleagues, or acquaintances sometimes sell girls to sex traffickers. The girls' parents or the trafficker may take her to the hospital to get a virginity test.

Some sex traffickers impersonate police officers to gain victims' trust.

Perpetrators are motivated by monetary incentives.

=== Online deception ===
Perpetrators in China use the internet, gaming sites, social media, WeChat, Telegram, and other messaging apps to lure victims. Male traffickers often entice females with phony online dating relationships and persuade them to move to a different province or abroad, then subject them to sexual slavery.

== Unreported crimes ==
The scope of intra-provincial, inter-provincial, and international sex trafficking of women in China is not well understood because of data scarcity. Data collection of sex trafficking crimes in China have been flawed, which has led to incidents not being reported. A criminologist in the People's Public Security University of China stated, “behind every reported sex abuse case, there might be six hidden cases unreported”. Victims might be fearful and or ashamed to report a sex crime. Children and mentally disabled persons might not be aware that such illegal acts has been committed against them. Some brothels with sex trafficked victims operate underground.

== Legal framework ==
Victims were legally entitled to request criminal prosecution and claim financial restitution through civil lawsuits against their traffickers.

China has not signed, ratified, acceded to the convention to Suppress the Slave Trade and Slavery or Supplementary Convention on the Abolition of Slavery. It has for the Protocol to Prevent, Suppress and Punish Trafficking in Persons, Especially Women and Children, Optional Protocol on the Sale of Children, Child Prostitution and Child Pornography

Article 240 of the Chinese Criminal Code criminalized the “abducting and trafficking of women or children.” Article 244 criminalized the forcing of a person “to work by violence, threat or restriction of personal freedom” and recruiting, transporting, or otherwise assisting in forcing others to labor. Article 358 criminalized forced prostitution. Under the provisions of article 296 of the Criminal Code, a person who enslaves another or places him in a position without freedom, similar to slavery, shall be punished with imprisonment for not less than one and not more than seven years. Article 359 criminalized harboring prostitution or seducing or introducing others into prostitution.

The Chinese government maintained insufficient law enforcement efforts of sex trafficking. It has been recommended that China vigorously investigate, prosecute, and impose prison sentences on perpetrators of sex trafficking; update the legal framework concerning the criminalization of sex trafficking, including the facilitation of prostitution involving children younger than the age of 18; expand efforts to institute proactive, formal procedures to systematically identify trafficking victims throughout the country; train front-line officers on their implementation; cease penalization of victims for acts committed as a direct result of being subjected to sex trafficking; ensure authorities do not subject trafficking victims to detention, punishment, or forcible repatriation; increase the transparency of government efforts to combat trafficking and provide disaggregated data on investigations and prosecutions, victim identification, and service provision, including by continuing to share relevant data with international partners.

== Anti-sex trafficking mechanisms ==
China has a “National Plan of Action on Combating Trafficking in Women and Children.” The Ministry of Public Security, Ministry of Civil Affairs, Supreme People's Court, and All China Women's Federation have issued various joint policies on prosecution, prevention, and victim protection. The Inter-Ministerial Joint Meeting Mechanism (IMJMM) holds annual and thematic meetings as well as information sharing on a monthly basis. Anti-sex trafficking campaigns have been disseminated through television, print media and online platforms. Numerous documentaries and animations have been produced and broadcast to raise awareness among the general public.

Chinese police work in cooperation with consuls to rescue foreign victims in China.

Coordinated Mekong Ministerial Initiative against Trafficking (COMMIT) Task Force (2005), with UN-ACT as secretariat. Chinese law enforcement carries out hotspot policing conducted in high-risk areas and joint border operations conducted with law enforcement counterparts in Vietnam and Myanmar. A team of interpreters for Greater Mekong Sub-region (GMS) languages has been established to support cross-border case investigations. Thailand offers bounties for the arrest of Chinese traffickers operating in its territory.

An “Operational Guide for Anti-Trafficking Police” has been established and is currently used by police officers.

Several projects have been initiated by the All China Women's Federation (ACWF) to prevent trafficking among migrant populations in various source and destination provinces.

Shelters provide interim care to trafficking victims with managers and staff in most provinces having received training (Ministry of Civil Affairs). An operational guide to assist victims of trafficking has been developed and distributed to all shelters.

=== Official and police training ===
Training for police, teachers, social workers, labor inspectors, immigration officials, shelter managers, marriage registration officials, and other government workers has taken place on basic legal frameworks surrounding sexual slavery and victim identification. In conjunction with an international organisation, authorities sponsored and participated in trainings on victim identification and assistance for consular officials and law enforcement, regulation of marriage migration, and interagency implementation of the national referral mechanism. The Ministry of Public Security promulgated written instructions to law enforcement officers throughout the country with the aim of clarifying procedures for identifying victims among individuals in prostitution and those who may be subjected to exploitation via forced or fraudulent marriage. The government reported funding training in rural areas for court officials and prosecutors; however, it did not provide detailed information on these efforts. In addition, law enforcement officials, prosecutors, and judges attended trainings on trafficking organized by other countries and international organizations; when authorities participated in these trainings, the PRC sometimes provided speakers and venues, and funded lodging, transportation, and meals for some participants. The office to combat trafficking in persons developed and approved trafficking victim identification procedures and disseminated them to law enforcement officials throughout the country. The government acknowledged that victim identification procedures varied according to local officials' training and understanding of trafficking; this variation increased the risk that unidentified trafficking victims were detained and deported following arrest for unlawful acts committed as a direct result of being subjected to human trafficking.

=== Public education ===
Public education about sex crimes in China exists but is insufficient. Many Chinese children receive little information about sexual offences and have a weak awareness or capability to protect themselves from such offences.

China's highest-rated television channel ran broadcasts raising awareness on trafficking. The government disseminates some anti-trafficking messages in train and bus stations and through media such as cell phones, television, and the internet. Through China's social media platforms, such as Sina Weibo, the Ministry of Public Security reported using its official microblog to raise awareness of trafficking and receive information from the public regarding suspected trafficking cases. In 2018, the Ministry of Public Security reportedly sent 350,000 police officers to public schools to educate children about the risks of exploitation. Article highlights announcement of rescued children on Weibo, a popular Chinese microblogging platform, accompanied by photos of them. At the end of the article, tips and reminders are provided for readers on what to do if they suspect any instance of child trafficking or abduction. A link is also provided to the National Abduction and Family Search Platform, which acts as a directory for abducted and trafficked children.

=== Organizational Support ===
The two Women's Federations and the Publicity Department focus on raising awareness and provide assistance with victim support. They run annual campaigns that focus on school curricula, television ads, and transportation hubs, especially around the time of the Spring Festival.

Some other outlets that women and other vulnerable groups can go to for self-expression and protection include the National Working Committee on Children and Women (NWCCW), which is an institution that works under the State Council to guide the Chinese government on providing important human, financial, and material aid for the development of women and children. The NWCCW also works closely with local government leaders to urge them to perform their duties and maintain support for groups that do not usually get much representation. A few non-governmental outlets have also risen to power and play an essential role in developing women's rights. The All-China Federation of Trade Unions, the All-China Women's Federation (ACWF), the Central Committee of the Communist Youth League, and the China Disabled Persons’ Federation have all focused on gender equality work. And while each group has their own distinct advantages and disadvantages, they are all united under the same goal of motivating women to participate in the country's social development.

=== Reporting ===
Government websites provide a list of relevant agencies and departments and their hotlines. Several of the most popular apps in China have the additional function of helping locate missing persons through localized push notifications. Scores of specialist apps for registering family members young and old or reporting suspected child trafficking have also been appearing in the country's app stores. The free, 24/7 dial 110 nationwide police calling system allows victims or witnesses to obtain assistance from the police.

== Government response problems ==
According to Human Rights Watch, Chinese law enforcement officers in certain jurisdictions make little effort to save sex trafficking victims.

There has not been an increase in public reports of sexual slavery cases in recent years. The Ministry of Public Security has not reported the number of investigations initiated into possible trafficking cases.

The reporting mechanisms (websites, hotline, etc.) do operate in multiple languages.

Training for first responders of trafficking crimes is not delivered systematically and at regular intervals. Reports suggest that screening procedures exist, but it is unclear if these have been distributed to all first responders or concern both victim screening and identification.

== Corruption ==
Some government officials and police have been complicit in sex trafficking. Some police have demanded bribes in order to return victims to their families. Chinese border guards have also been accused of collusion with traffickers.

== Government human rights violations ==
The Chinese government's human rights violations have hampered anti-sex trafficking initiatives. Sustained attacks on organizations and lawyers have resulted in victims not being able to seek justice.

== Anti-trafficking Organizations ==
There are civil society organizations working to rescue women, but these organizations have limited resources.

Christian organizations save sex trafficked victims in China.

Agape International Missions and Blue Dragon Children's Foundation save victims of sex trafficking in China.

The Korea Future Initiative is a London-based organization that obtains evidence and publicizes violations of human rights, including the sex and cybersex trafficking of North Korean women and girls in China.
