= Long Meiyi =

Long Meiyi (Chinese: 龙美伊) is a woman from Guizhou province in China who alleged she was raped by mining magnate Zhou Shili. Long's allegations made domestic and international headlines after she and her parents began appealing to Beijing for justice and complaining of corruption in the courts. A significant factor in the case's popularity is that Long's mother and stepfather are government officials in China, who have generally found themselves on the other side of the politicised legal system that she now claims is obstructing the justice she seeks.

Long's case caused a sensation in the Chinese blogosphere as it was revealed that her stepfather, Tian Wancang, was responsible for Liupanshui's "stability preservation" efforts, which means that in addition to police and other security groups, he ran the letters and complaints system that is supposed to provide an avenue for disgruntled citizens while simultaneously focusing on gathering intelligence about those citizens.

== Background ==
When Long was 19, she met Zhou Shili at a Beijing night club. It was 26 December 2008. Long says that Zhou then tried to curry favour with her in hopes of gaining access to her stepfather, Tian Wancang, the vice-mayor of Liupanshui, a city of approximately 3 million people.

Zhou is the head of Qingli Group, which owns a number of mines in China, and he is also a standing committee member of the provincial China People's Political Consultative Conference, a political advisory body that provides him with access to top people in the government.

In January 2009, Long went with Zhou to meet her parents in Guiyang, after which, her mother told her to cut off contact with him. On 8 January 2009, Long says she attempted to end the relationship with Zhou while at their hotel. She says Zhou became angry and proceeded to rape her. Zhou denies the allegations of rape, insisting that their sexual relations were consensual.

At the center of Long's rape allegations is the Chinese concept of "guanxi," a complex term referring to relationships based on reciprocity. According to Long, Zhou wanted more guanxi in Guizhou and saw her as foothold to help him build his way up to get the needed relationships to open a mining operation there. When Long tried to break off the short relationship, she says he felt it was a violation of guanxi; because he had given her gifts and paid for their trip, he felt entitled to more efforts from her to help him make contacts. The rape, she says, was partially retaliatory in nature.

== Appeals ==
Long took her case to the police, and after being disappointed in the justice system, began appealing through official channels, eventually going to Beijing to try her luck with the central government. She was repeatedly detained and sent back to Guizhou, only to return again later. After she contacted the media with her story, the case became widely known and heavily discussed on Chinese social media sites like Sina Weibo.

Long's father, Tian Fangchang, who himself has been officially tasked with quieting dissent told the Yangcheng Evening News in a 7 July 2011 interview, that he scolded his daughter for her appeals in Beijing because he “feared it would damage Guizhou’s image.” Then, on 19 July, he officially stated, “I will use the Party’s nature and Party discipline to guarantee that in the past, now, or in the future, I will not do anything to damage the image or interests of the Party.” The next day, on 20 July 2011, the People’s Daily, Beijing's state-run newspaper, published an article stating that the rape allegations “were not true.” Zhou then took to the media to defend himself, giving an interview to Phoenix TV, wherein he admitted to the relationship but insisted that he did not rape Long.

== Aftermath ==
Zhou Shili recused himself from his political position and came under fire at his company because of the pressures from the case.
