= Sex trafficking in Hong Kong =

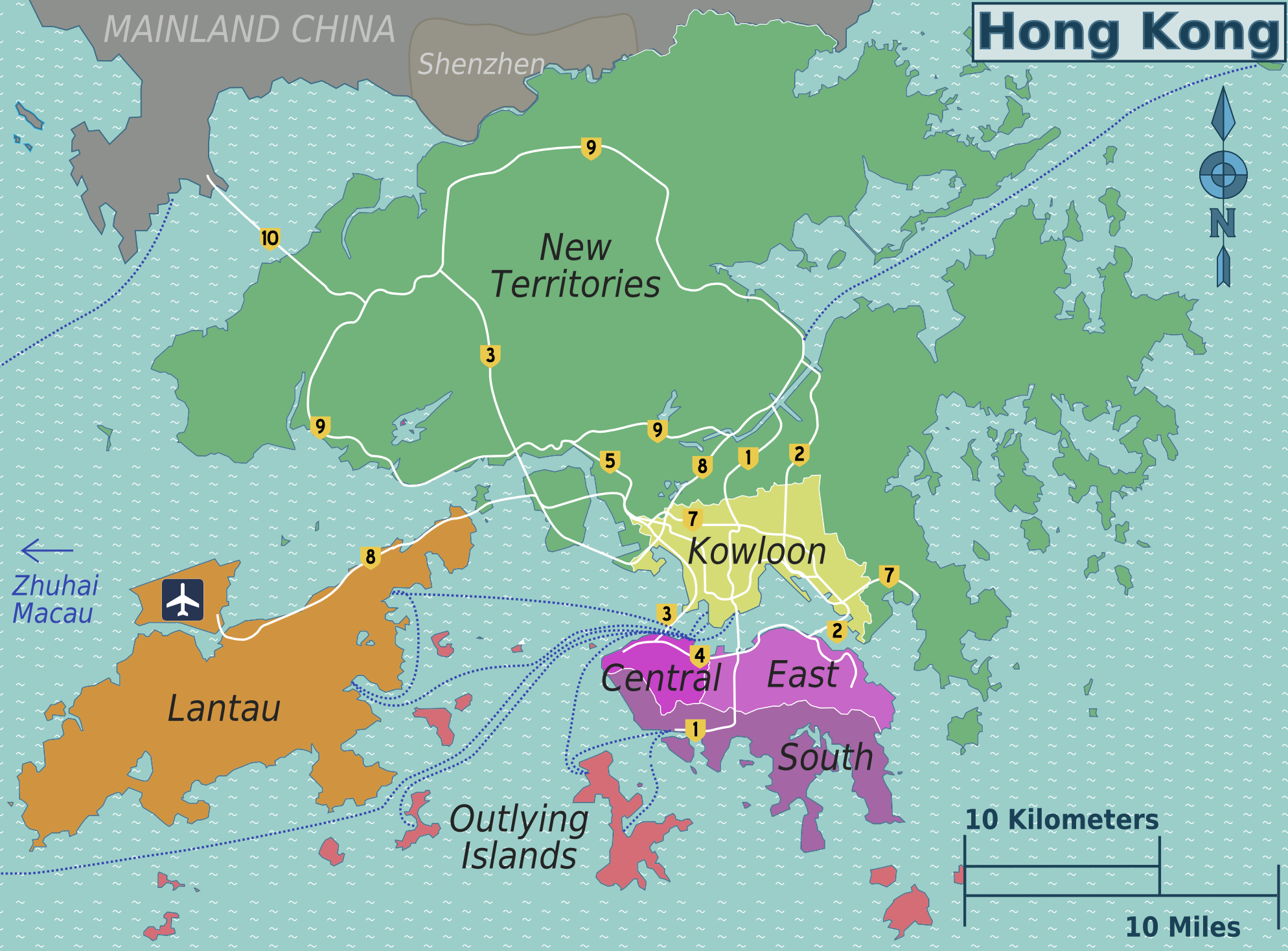
Hong Kong citizen and foreign victims are sex trafficked into and out of the districts of Hong Kong

Sex trafficking in Hong Kong is human trafficking for the purpose of sexual exploitation and slavery that occurs in Hong Kong. Hong Kong is a city of origin and a destination for sexually trafficked persons. The Government of Hong Kong denies that trafficking is a prevalent crime in Hong Kong, but the U.S. State Department's Office to Monitor and Combat Trafficking in Persons ranked Hong Kong as Tier 2 watchlist in its Trafficking in Persons Report in 2016, where, except in 2019 and 2023, it has remained. The Government has rebutted the reports on several occasions.

Hong Kong women and children are victims of sex trafficking within the region. A lot of the prostitutes in Hong Kong are from Mainland China. Researchers and sources within the industry suggest many of them are trafficked. Traffickers recruit victims from Thailand, the Philippines, Mainland China, and countries in South America using false promises of lucrative employment and force them into commercial sex. Some foreign victims entered Hong Kong on two-week tourist visas, as part of a circuit of major cities in the region used by traffickers, including Bangkok and Taipei, and were coerced into commercial sex through debt-based coercion. Some employment agencies reportedly hired foreign domestic workers under false pretences and forced them into commercial sex. Women from Eastern Europe, Africa, and Southeast Asia are also sex trafficked into Hong Kong.

Triads have been involved in sex trafficking in Hong Kong for many years. Thunderbolt 2023, a crackdown on Triads between 12 June and 21 September, resulted in 6,400. Some of these arrests were in connection with sex trafficking. 28 people, with connections to the 14K Triads, were arrested in November 2024 in connection with sex trafficking.

NGOs report increasing occurrences of online commercial sex acts. Traffickers use coercive methods, such as threats of reporting victims to police or immigration authorities, withholding of identification documents, and blackmailing victims with threats of online distribution of photographs, to coerce them to engage in online commercial sex acts.

Women from Hong Kong are trafficked into North America and the UK for commercial sex.

== Legal situation ==
Section 129(1) of the Crimes Ordinance states:

Who takes part in bringing another person into, or taking a person out of, Hong Kong, for the purpose of prostitution, shall be guilty of an offence ….

Section 129(2) adds that the consent a person being trafficked is not a defence.

As the Ordinance only covers cross-border trafficking, domestic victims are not covered.

Hong Kong is not a signatory of the UN TIP Protocol. The Office of the United Nations High Commissioner for Human Rights have recommended Hong Kong ratify the Protocol and introduce legislation to outlaw all forms of Human Trafficking.
