= Keon Chia =

Keon Chia is a music producer and partner in Burger Music Studio.

== Early life ==
Chia was born on February 25th, 1985 in Miri, Sarawak into a family with a background in politics in Sarawak. His great-grandfather, Tze Chin Chia, was a businessman and prominent figure in the early Chinese community of Miri in Sarawak. His grandfather, Datuk Seri Chin Shin Chia, served as a member of parliament and Assistant Director of the Ministry of Welfare. Following Datuk Seri Chin Shin Chia's retirement, he was appointed by the state government as the Temenggong of Sarawak Province.

Chia's father, Toon Fatt Chia, won two categories in the Astro Senior Singing Competition in 2003 and encouraged his son's interest in pursuing a career in music. Keon's mother, Meimei Kuan, is a singing instructor and all members of the family share a passion for music and singing. Keon started writing songs at the age of 15 after learning guitar and piano and has received unwavering support from his parents in expressing his musical talent. His father taught him how to sing and play songs and his grandmother has provided him with financial support for any equipment he may need.

After graduating from Chung Hua Middle school, Keon enrolled in Broadcasting studies at Oneworld Hanxin College. His music talent received recognition in 2005 when he became a restaurant performer.

== Career ==
=== Early career ===
In 2006, Hsieh participated in the "Xin Miao Cup” songwriting competition in Oneworld Hanxin College and won three awards: Best composition, Best performance, and Championship. In the same year, he won the championship in the songwriting competition in the TV program “Shout Out! It’s Saturday Night” on NTV7. The judges were Jovi Theng, Nick Zhong, and Guoxiang Zhang; they signed Hsieh to be a singer under Echo Stone Records. In September 2007, he released the album "Yue Lu Xing 樂旅行" with Genie. In the album, he wrote 70% of the lyrics and music. In December of the following year, he was nominated for the Best New Artist in the Malaysia PWH Music Award.

Hsieh's first hit song released overseas was "Shang 傷" sung by the Chinese singer Daimo Li. The song served as a milestone in his music career and enabled him to produce many more songs one after another. In 2009, Hsieh officially started his career as a music producer. Over the years, he has participated in the production of many works including the hit song in Yixin Lin's album, album production for Ariel Zheng, radio station music for Chen Jiakai, concert director for Yiyi Chen, and debut EP for Sheena Yanting, etc.

=== Songwriter and producer ===
Hsieh has worked with Warner Chappell Music for over ten years, and released songs all over Asia Pacific. His works include Crowd Lu’s "Your name engraved herein 刻在我心底的名字", Karen Mok’s "My Dear 親愛的", A-Lin’s "I’m not sorry 抱歉我不抱歉", Andrew Tan's "Broken 壞掉的我們", Angela Changs "Return 還", Daimo Li's "Shang 傷", Janice Yan's "Grim Reaper 閻羅王", Rainie Yang’s "Don’t Care Anymore 與我無關", Linong Chen and Lala Hsu’s "Unsure 一無所知", and Julia Pengs "When I look back 我想念我自己", etc. He has also worked with singers such as Momo Wu, Terry Lin, Wallace Chung, Hankyung, Ailing Tai, Mi Zhou, Yisa Yu, Della, etc.

Since 2011, Hsieh became the Director for the digital concert of Malaysian artists. He was also invited to perform theme songs for TV series, such as “Heart to heart 心點心", "Ni Zhi Dao 你知道", "My Sensei Nyonya 娘惹相思格", "Jie yau 解藥", etc.

In 2018, Hsieh has been nominated as the "Top 10 Original Song (international)" in the Malaysia PWH Music Award with Karen Mok's "My Dear 親愛的". In 2020, he won the award "Top 8 Award" in the Ultimate Song Chart Awards with Jason Chan’s "Gan Qing Zhe Hui Shi 感情這回事". In the same year, he collaborated with Singaporean musician 陳文華 and Malaysian lyricist Yuanting Xu to create Crowd Lu's "Your name engraved herein 刻在我心底的名字", which is the theme song of the movie in the same title. The song received great feedback in the market and was awarded "Best Original Song" in the 57th Golden Horse Awards and "Song of the Year" in the 32nd Golden Melody Awards. Hsieh himself was also congratulated by the JKKN Assistant Director Dato Sebastian Ting Chiew Yew.

=== Entrepreneurship ===
In 2014, Hsieh started Burger Music Studio with Zhenghao Wu and Yaojian Wang as partners. The business focuses on producing albums and singles and also serves as an original publishing (OP) company, aiming to support songwriters to sell their work.

== Personal life ==
He and his wife have known each other for about a decade since they met as students and were married in 2013. In 2014, Hsieh wrote a song "Popomama 婆婆媽媽" for his grandmother's 90th birthday as a tribute to the seniors in his family. In 2017, Hsieh's father died, and Hsieh also wrote a song for him, which was later released as "Ceng Jing You Ge Peng You 曾經有個朋友" sung by Don Chu. Whenever he has songs released, his family share the work to show support for his career. Hsieh is very grateful for all the encouragement and support he receives from his family, because they allow him to pursue his career without having to worry about anything.

== Works ==
Released	Singer	Song	Lyrics by	Composed by	Participated in
2021-8-17	A-Lin	一无所有时的爱情	吕易秋	Euywein杨展鸿/Keon Chia	
2021-7-19	汪苏泷	照亮黑夜的太阳	张鹏鹏/浅紫	MUNA	Harmonics and harmonics arrangement
2021-6-28	黄若熙	这世界总是劝我不要放弃	饶彗冰/黄若熙	Keon Chia/王耀建/吴振豪	Production/Vocal production
2021-6-28	Zen俊倩	你会更好的	Zen俊倩/洪健瑞	Zen俊倩	Strings arrangement
2021-6-28	Freya Lin	亲爱的爱丽丝	许媛婷	Keon Chia	
2021-6-15	姚慧	灰心	吕易秋	Keon Chia	
2021-5-23	Andrew Tan	遗失的灵魂《HIStory4-近距離愛上你》插曲	洪健瑞	Keon Chia	Arrangements/Harmonics
2021-5-23	Andrew Tan	心之所往 「HBL高中籃球甲級聯賽主題曲」	Keon Chia／陳海維／許媛婷	Keon Chia／陳海維／許媛婷	Arrangements
2021-5-12	Fuying & Sam, 梁祖儀	因你而完美	肯林	肯林/Fuying	Production, Arrangements, Harmonics
2021-5-5	A-lin	遠在心中的你(電視劇《風暴舞》插曲)	马嵩惟	CHOI SANGIN, KIM HADON	Harmonics and harmonics arrangement
2021-5-4	沈以誠	乘風而起「風暴舞」插曲	徐昊/浅紫	浅紫	Harmonics and harmonics arrangement
2021-5-4	Julia Peng	满山的花	許媛婷	Keon Chia	
2021-4-29	鄭雲龍	重生「風暴舞」插曲	张鹏鹏/浅紫	都智文	Harmonics and harmonics arrangement
2021-4-24	赵传	以前忘了告诉你	姚若龙	Keon Chia	
2021-4-23	潘裕文	无人知晓的浪漫	林珺帆	Euywein 杨展鸿/Keon Chia	
2021-4-15	凌加峻, 陳珂冰	每日給你一個擁抱	凌加峻	凌加峻	Arrangements
2021-3-26	徐凯	无人签收的幸福	洪健瑞	徐凯/Keon Chia	
2021-3-26	潘虹	还在等待	Keon Chia	Keon Chia	Arrangements
2021-3-5	陈柏宇	悔过书	陈咏谦	Euywein杨展鸿/Keon Chia	
2021-2-14	文俊辉	寂寞号登机口	易家扬	陈劲豪/严世茗/杨嘉成/Keon Chia/王俊凯	
2021-2-9	蝦王	等你回家	怪兽Monsterz	怪兽Monsterz	Harmonics and harmonics arrangement
2021-1-22	蔡恩雨, Fun噓	回首往事	Keon Chia/吳振豪/王耀建	Keon Chia/吳振豪/王耀建	Production/Arrangements/Harmonics
2021-1-29	Jam Hsiao	不完美的我	林孝谦	蕭敬騰	Arrangements
2021-1-8	钟明轩	雨咧落	武雄	Euywein 杨展鸿/Keon Chia	
2020-12-25	Hui Ng	傷心歌聽傷心歌	十方	徐偉銘	Arrangements
2020-12-25	Hui Ng	紅帖仔	方文良	徐偉銘	Arrangements
2020-12-25	Hui Ng	輪抉著你	高薇芯	徐偉銘/高薇芯	Arrangements
2020-12-25	Hui Ng	心疼驗無傷	張欣瑜	林從胤	Arrangements
2020-12-21	王博文	不一样的月光	林若宁	Keon Chia	Production/Harmonics
2020-12-6	大颖	我是不是你最疼爱的人	小虫	小虫	Arrangements
2020-12-1	黄若熙	对不起谢谢你我爱你	饒彗冰/黃若熙	Keon Chia/王耀建/吳振豪	Production
2020-11-30	郑荔分	小城故事	庄奴	汤尼	Arrangements
2020-11-9	品冠	爱你需要练习	许媛婷	品冠	Arrangements
2020-11-5	梁嘉靖	味之道「味之道」主题曲	何维健/方炯镓	何维健/方炯镓	Arrangements
2020-11-3	莊凌芸	下次遇見再相愛「说不出的告别宣传曲」	昨梦	吱吱	Arrangements
2020-10-9	李濠德	再说	李濠德	李濠德	Arrangements
2020-10-5	陳珂冰	哭笑	饶彗冰	吴振豪	Production, Arrangements
2020-9-25	A-Lin	抱歉我不抱歉「恋爱好好说」主题曲	黃偉文	Keon Chia	
2020-9-16	茜拉	Kita我们	怪兽Monsterz	怪兽Monsterz	Production, Arrangements, Harmonics
2020-9-11	陈柏宇	感情这回事	陈咏谦	Keon Chia	Arrangements
2020-9-1	Jam Hsiao	悟空传（2020重唱版）	今何在/赵英俊	赵英俊	Arrangements
2020-08-25	吴岱林, 菜头琦	坠落星空	小星星Aurora	小星星Aurora	Harmonics
2020-8-24	Crowd Lu	刻在我心底的名字	許媛婷/Keon Chia/陳文華	許媛婷/Keon Chia/陳文華	
2020-8-13	大颖	值得	廖莹如	黄明洲	Arrangements
2020-8-13	大颖	我们没有在一起	黄婷	木兰号 AKA 陈韦伶	Arrangements
2020-08-12	Jing Wong	离开我	袁惟仁	袁惟仁	Production, Arrangements, Harmonics
2020-08-12	Jing Wong	味道	姚謙	黃國倫	Production, Arrangements, Harmonics
2020-08-12	Jing Wong	踮起脚尖爱	小寒	蔡健雅	Production, Arrangements, Harmonics
2020-8-12	何维健	爱情字典	易家扬	陳文華	Production, Arrangements, Harmonics
2020-07-13	张一腾	她	周启儿	Keon Chia	
2020-7-6	周星星	我看過	黄政彬/曾歆沂/周星星	Keon Chia/吴周烁/周星星	Arrangements
2020-7-2	王子異	誰「怪你過分美麗」插曲	浅紫	滕少	Harmonics
2020-6-10	大颖	该怎么原谅	方炯镓	方炯镓	Arrangements
2020-5-29	陈立农, 徐佳瑩	一无所知	蓝小邪	Keon Chia/吴振豪/饶彗冰/郭文翰/吕孙杰	
2020-5-2	Keon Chia, 林文蓀	一起呼喊	怪兽Monsterz	怪兽Monsterz	Production, Arrangements, Harmonics
2020-5	吴岱林	时差	許媛婷	Keon Chia	Production/Arrangements/Harmonics
2020-4-23	罗时丰	为你命名	彬杰	Keon Chia	
2020-4-1	不逻辑	你并不孤单	許媛婷	Keon Chia/Euywein Yong楊展鴻/David/Chit wei/Jintat	Production/Harmonics
2020-3-6	潘嘉麗	我們沒有愛錯	吳易緯	坂诘美纱	Harmonics
2020-1-13	大颖	爱自己更深	方炯镓	方炯镓	Arrangements
2020-1-13	雷颖	爱你爱的那么笨	方炯镓	方炯镓	Arrangements
2019-12-30	2019年亞洲小姐	美麗冠軍	怪兽Monsterz	怪兽Monsterz	Production, Harmonics
2019-12-25	One Fm	快樂數不清	Keon Chia	Keon Chia	
2019-12-24	王栎鑫	大不了就再遗憾	林家谦/Keon Chia/钟婉芸	林家谦/Keon Chia/钟婉芸	
2019-12-20	Showlen Maya	八字	十方	方文良	Arrangements
2019-12-20	Showlen Maya	繡娘	方文良	林从胤	Arrangements
2019-12-20	Showlen Maya	傷痕是花	十方	高薇芯/徐伟铭	Arrangements
2019-12-20	Showlen Maya	若會曉飛	方文良	徐伟铭	Arrangements
2019-12-20	陳梓童	閃閃	陈梓童/吴国菲	Keon Chia/吴国菲/Colbie 王思涵	
2019-12-17	邓典	独特	吴振豪	Keon Chia	Production
2019-12-17	邓典	悲极生乐	杨格/李知锦/廖羽	廖羽	Production, Arrangements, Harmonics
2019-11-29	黃若熙	三千三百公里外	黄若熙	黄若熙/章国伟	Arrangements
2019-11-22	晟敏	I pray	晟敏	黄韵仁/Keon Chia	Arrangements
2019-11-20	蕭秉治	再活一遍	萧秉治/吴圣皓	林喆安	Strings arrangements
2019-10-7	李家歡	過期了	少女	游政豪	Harmonics
2019-10-7	李家歡	無解	李家歡	李家歡	Harmonics
2019-10-7	李家歡	油畫	伍家辉/傅健颖	伍家辉	Harmonics
2019-10-7	李家歡	開放世界	严云农	游政豪	Harmonics
2019-10-4	王瑞霞	一个	十方	方文良	Arrangements
2019-10-4	王瑞霞	孤单的人徛规排	十方	方文良	Arrangements
2019-10-4	王瑞霞, Hui Ng, Showlen Maya	咱的膨纱衫	虫二	林从胤	Arrangements
2019-9-20	Angela Chang	还	林乔/刘恩汛	Keon Chia	
2019-8-24	孫慧雪	幸福的錯覺	王樂儀	Robynn Yip/鍾婉芸/Keon Chia	
2019-8-17	Dickson Chai	拜託別太過火	Dickson Chai/Endee Ahmad	Dickson Chai/Endee Ahmad	Production, Arrangements, Harmonics
2019-7-12	品冠	投己所好	洪健瑞	Keon Chia/徐凯	Arrangements
2019-5-20	謝佳潔	雙人島	温伟杰	Keon Chia	Production, Arrangements, Harmonics, Mixing, Mastering
2019-5-9	李子森	手放开	十方	方文良	Arrangements
2019-4-30	Dickson Chai	我的三十幾怎麼了	Dickson Chai	Dickson Chai	Production, Arrangements, Harmonics
2019-4-2	Della	成瘾《HIStory3圈套》插曲	余琛懋	Keon Chia/方炯嘉	
2019-3-15	徐凯	其实也不想	洪健瑞	Uriah徐凯/Keon Chia	Production, Arrangements
2019-1-11	Dickson Chai	你不要再問我幾時結婚	Dickson Chai	Dickson Chai	Production, Arrangements, Harmonics
2018-12-31	Hui Ng	福气	谢志豪	谢志豪	Arrangements
2018-12-31	Hui Ng	咱的情歌	陈佳惠	徐凤仪	Arrangements
2018-12-31	Hui Ng	你敢知我毋知	十方	林从胤	Arrangements
2018-12-31	Hui Ng	画你	十方	徐伟铭	Arrangements
2018-12-31	Hui Ng	思念上路	林东松	林东松	Arrangements
2018-12-31	Hui Ng	月娘敢会知	武雄	陈世娟	Arrangements
2018-12-28	魏晖倪	二七定律	魏晖倪	Keon Chia	
2018-12-20	范世琦	星期一去跑步	李欣怡	Keon Chia	
2018-12-13	五福星	幸福满桌	傅健颖	伍家辉	Arrangements
2018-12-1	林一心	認真你就輸了	管启源	Keon Chia	Production, Harmonics
2018-12-1	林一心	高攀	管启源	Keon Chia	Production, Arrangements
2018-12-1	林一心	我倆	管启源	许亮宇	Production, Harmonics
2018-12-1	林一心	謝謝你勇敢	管启源	林轩羽	Production, Harmonics
2018-11-1	黃若熙	嘿你好嗎	饶彗冰/黄若熙	Keon Chia/吴振豪	Production, Arrangements
2018-10-25	徐凯	一个人的旅程	许媛婷	陈劲豪	Production, Arrangements
2018-8-31	Andrew Tan	壞掉的大人	林彬杰/彭学斌	陈海维/TuxBoNic	Production, Harmonics
2018-8-31	Andrew Tan	潜伏期	小寒	Keon Chia/林轩羽	Production, Harmonics
2018-8-24	林文荪	这世界终会记得我的名字	管启源	Keon Chia	
2018-6-28	朱兴东	曾经有个朋友	Keon Chia	Keon Chia	
2018-6-22	Jam Hsiao	迷茫世代	阿弟仔	阿弟仔	钢琴
2018-6-13	傅健穎	娘惹《娘惹相思格》片尾曲	伍家輝/傅健穎	伍家輝	Arrangements
2018-6-13	Keon Chia	解药《娘惹相思格》主题曲	李欣怡	伍家辉/Keon Chia	Arrangements
2018-6-8	Jess Lee	装睡的人	小寒	Keon Chia	
2018-5-18	李俊頡	記得我愛你《我的非一般岳母》片尾曲	杨俊康	杨俊康	Arrangements
2018-4-20	周覓	我不管	饶彗冰	Keon Chia/Oliver Kim	
2018-1-26	Showlen Maya	尚愛的相愛	徐伟铭	徐伟铭	Arrangements
2018-1-26	Showlen Maya	戇甲有賰	陳靜楠	方文良	Arrangements
2017-12-29	黄若熙	卸妆	吴振豪/饶彗冰	Keon Chia/吴振豪	Production, Harmonics
2017-12-29	黄若熙	你要快乐	龔建仲/饒彗冰	吴振豪	Production, Arrangements, Harmonics
2017-12-29	黄若熙	放空	饒彗冰	吴振豪	Production, Arrangements
2017-12-29	黄若熙	獲得	吳振豪/饒彗冰	吴振豪	Production, Arrangements
2017-12-29	Julia Peng	我想念我自己	阿超/Keon Chia/林家谦	阿超/Keon Chia/林家谦	
2017-12-29	Julia Peng	你不爱我	饶彗冰/吴振豪	郭文翰/Keon Chia/吴振豪	
2017-11-1	Daimo Li	不成气候	Hush	Keon Chia	
2017-10-20	Janice Yan	阎罗王	黄伟文	Keon Chia/陈文华	
2017-10-20	Janice Yan	万中无一	黄伟文	Keon Chia/陈文华	
2017-3-28	志祥	騙子	溫偉傑	溫偉傑	Production
2016-12-28	孫露	兩個朋友	alan、李三木	Keon Chia	
2016-12-28	Hui Ng	囍	谢志豪	谢志豪	Arrangements
2016-12-27	Yisa Yu	电梯	金玟岐	Keon Chia	
2016-12-27	Yisa Yu	21天	姚若龙	Keon Chia	
2016-12-14	颜慧萍	你看见什么	饶彗冰	Keon Chia	Arrangements
2016-10-26	謝承偉	得獎感言	文康	吴振豪/吴振汉	Production, Arrangements, Harmonics
2016-10-26	李詩斌, 謝承偉	偶像	文康	陈建宁	Production, Harmonics
2016-9-30	黄若熙	It's my time	叶家豪	叶家豪	Production
2016-9-30	黄若熙	你就不要說愛我	吴振豪/饶彗冰	吴振豪	Production, Arrangements
2016-9-30	Rainie Yang	与我无关	饶彗冰	Keon Chia	
2016-7-13	冯建宇	爱为你出发	林尚德/洪诚孝	林尚德/Keon Chia	
2016-5-14	等巴士的小孩, 简文豪	爸爸妈妈	吴振豪	吴振豪	Production, Arrangements, Harmonics
2016-5-6	Jess Lee (歌手)	妄想者	姚若龙	Keon Chia	
2015-12-1	钟汉良	乐作人生	饶慧冰	Keon Chia	
2015-11-20	亦帆	来了走了忘了	伍贰柒	Keon Chia	
2015-10-22	Fuying & Sam	靠近	肆一	吳國菲	Production, Harmonics
2015-8-1	Dickson Chai	自衛術	Dickson Chai	Dickson Chai	Production, Arrangements, Harmonics
2015-8-1	Dickson Chai	打工仔狂想曲	Dickson Chai	Dickson Chai	Production, Arrangements, Harmonics
2015-8-1	Dickson Chai	我已经下班了	Dickson Chai	Dickson Chai	Production, Arrangements, Harmonics
2015-8-1	Dickson Chai	打工潮男	Dickson Chai	Dickson Chai	Production, Arrangements, Harmonics
2015-8-1	Dickson Chai	荧光棒	Dickson Chai	Dickson Chai	Production, Arrangements, Harmonics
2015-8-1	Dickson Chai	现代月光曲	Dickson Chai	Dickson Chai	Production, Arrangements, Harmonics
2015-8-1	Dickson Chai	如果我的车有翅膀	Dickson Chai	Dickson Chai	Production, Arrangements, Harmonics
2015-8-1	Dickson Chai	只是爱唱歌的人	Dickson Chai	Dickson Chai	Production, Arrangements
2015-8-1	Dickson Chai	有空喝杯茶	Dickson Chai	Dickson Chai	Production, Arrangements, Harmonics
2015-8-1	Dickson Chai	放一个假期	Dickson Chai	Dickson Chai	Production, Arrangements, Harmonics
2015-7-10	Ailing Tai	爱是一起冒险	黄亮勋	吴振豪/Keon Chia	
2015-7-10	姚可杰	以后留给以后	Keon Chia	Keon Chia	
2015-6-22	Julia Peng	微微的幸福	吴振豪/饶彗冰	Keon Chia	
2014-12-28	徐梽豪	别对我崇拜	Keon Chia/伊藤	Keon Chia/吴振豪	Production, Harmonics
2014-12-26	Karen Mok	亲爱的	陈振宜	Keon Chia	
2014-4-18	吴莫愁	靠近	Keon Chia	Keon Chia	
2014-3-5	管罄	我讨厌照顾我自己	管罄	Keon Chia	
2014-1-13	Hankyung	那个女孩《前任攻略》主题曲	吴振豪/饶彗冰	Keon Chia	
2014-1-1	Rainie Yang	懂得自己	姚若龙	Keon Chia	
2014	等巴士的小孩	同类	吴振豪	吴振豪/Keon Chia	Production, Arrangements, Harmonics
2014	等巴士的小孩	自言自语	吴振豪/饶慧萍	吴振豪/Keon Chia	Production, Arrangements, Harmonics
2014	等巴士的小孩	失控	吴振豪/饶慧萍	吴振豪/Keon Chia	Production, Arrangements, Harmonics
2014	等巴士的小孩	随你吧			Production, Arrangements, Harmonics
2014	等巴士的小孩	Awaken			Production, Arrangements, Harmonics
2014	等巴士的小孩	流浪者	曾衡權	吴振豪	Production, Arrangements, Harmonics
2014	等巴士的小孩	怕寂寞	吴振豪	吴振豪/Keon Chia	Production, Arrangements, Harmonics
2013-9-23	丁丁	快乐练习曲	管启源/Keon Chia	Keon Chia	
2013-6-17	Daimo Li	伤	Keon Chia	Keon Chia	
2012-1-6	A-Lin	每一个我	叶蔓	Keon Chia	

== Personal albums ==
=== In group ===
Released	Performer	Song	Lyrics by	Composed by
2007-9-18	Keon Chia	Alright	Keon Chia	Keon Chia
2007-9-18	Keon Chia	Do re mi	Keon Chia	Keon Chia
2007-9-18	Keon Chia	光速	Keon Chia	Keon Chia
2007-9-18	Keon Chia, Genie	貪心你的思念	Keon Chia	Keon Chia
2007-9-18	Keon Chia, Genie	也許	Keon Chia	Keon Chia
2007-9-18	Keon Chia, Genie	泡麵	Genie	Keon Chia
2007-9-18	Genie	離開之前	Keon Chia	Keon Chia
2007-9-18	Genie	禮物	Keon Chia	Keon Chia
2007-9-18	Keon Chia, Genie	夜旅行	林新洲	罗家豪

=== Singles ===
Released	Performer	Song	Lyrics by	Composed by
2021-9-16	Keon Chia,陳儀芬	愛多一點點	林欣樂	陳儀芬
2020-4-1	不逻辑	你并不孤单	許媛婷	Keon Chia/Euywein Yong楊展鴻/David/Chit wei/Jintat
2020-5-2	Keon Chia，林文蓀	一起呼喊	怪兽Monsterz	怪兽Monsterz
2018-12-17	Keon Chia	"Heart to heart 心點心" (theme song for Ni Zhi Dao)	黎沸挥	黎沸挥
2018-6-13	Keon Chia	"Jie yau 解藥" (theme song for My Sensei Nyonya)	李欣怡	伍家辉/ Keon Chia
2008-5-27	Keon Chia, Genie	同一片天空	Keon Chia	Keon Chia

== Awards ==
Award	Awarded with	Song	Status
2022 Anugerah Industri Muzik (AIM) 2022	Best Chinese Song	《无人签收的幸福》Uriah See	Won
2020 Ultimate Song Chart Awards Presentation	8th in Top 10 Singles	《感情這回事》Jason Chan Pak Yu	Won
57th Golden Horse Awards	Best Original Song	Crowd Lu's "Your name engraved herein 刻在我心底的名字"	Won
32rd Golden Melody Awards	Song of the Year	Crowd Lu's "Your name engraved herein 刻在我心底的名字"	Won
14th Freshmusic Awards	Top 10 Singles of the Year	Crowd Lu's "Your name engraved herein 刻在我心底的名字"	Won
30th Malaysia PWH Music Award	Top 10 Original Song (international)	Karen Mok's "My Dear 親愛的"	Nominated
Taipei Film and Drama Union Joint Awards for Professional Excellence in Film, TV, and Radio	Special Recognition Award	Crowd Lu's "Your name engraved herein 刻在我心底的名字"	Won
2021 Hito Pop Music Awards	Top 10 Hits	Crowd Lu's "Your name engraved herein 刻在我心底的名字"	Won
2021 Hito Pop Music Awards	The Hito Soundtrack	Crowd Lu's "Your name engraved herein 刻在我心底的名字"	Won
