= Peter Lee (director) =

Chinese film director

- Born: Peter Lee Kui-yuen; Hong Kong
- Education: New York University
- Occupations: Writer, Director, Producer, Program Host

Peter Lee (Chinese: 李巨源; pinyin: Lǐ Jùyuán) is a Chinese film director.

== Early life ==
Peter Lee was born in Hong Kong in 1963 and immigrated to the United States in 1974. There, he attended New York University from 1982 to 1984, studying film. He later returned to Hong Kong.

== Film career ==
Peter Lee worked in various capacities with director Ang Lee, whom he knew as a fellow student at New York University. He played a role in his directorial debut Pushing Hands and then in several of Lee's other projects. Between 1995 and 1999, Peter Lee worked in Taiwan television.

Lee's 2017 film Love is a Broadway Hit stars Godfrey Gao, Wang Likun, Wang Chuanjun, Li Yuan (李媛) and Naren Weiss.

== Filmography ==
1998	The Candidate
2009	My Fair Gentleman
2013	Sex Argogo
2017	Love is a Broadway Hit
