= Zhang Bo (actor) =

Chinese actor (born 1982)

- 张博
- Born: August 29, 1982 (age 44); Beijing, China
- Other name: Jaco Zhang
- Education: Central Academy of Drama
- Occupation: Actor
- Years active: 2000–present

Chinese name
- Traditional Chinese: 張博
- Simplified Chinese: 张博
Transcriptions
Standard Mandarin
- Hanyu Pinyin: Zhāng Bó

Zhang Bo (Chinese: 张博; born 29 August 1982) is a Chinese actor. Zhang rose to fame for his roles in television series such as Three Kingdoms (2010) and The Qin Empire III (2017).

== Early life and education ==
Zhang was born in Beijing on August 29, 1982. He graduated from Central Academy of Drama.

== Acting career ==
Zhang first came to public attention in 2000 at the age of 18, appearing on Tianwang Qingwang.

In 2005, he acted as Prince Calaf in Turandot and won an Excellent Performance Award at the International Drama Festival.

Zhang starred with Jia Yiping, Ma Yili and Bai Baihe in the 2006 romantic comedy drama Where Is Happiness. On film in 2006, he played opposite Jaycee Chan, Chen Bolin and Niu Mengmeng in PK.COM.CN. In the following year, he had key supporting role in the romance drama Rich Man Poor Love.

Zhang co-starred with Zhang Fengyi, Jing Tian and You Yong in the 2009 historical drama Biography of Sun Tsu as Goujian.

In 2010, he appeared in Gao Xixi's Three Kingdoms, which earned him a Best New Actor at the Sohu Summer Teleplay Internet Festival. That same year, he starred in a television series called The Firmament of The Pleiades with Yûko Tanaka, Yu Shaoqun, Zhou Yiwei, Xu Baihui and Yin Tao. It is based on the novel by the same name by Jirō Asada.

Zhang was cast in the romantic comedy television series Scent of a Woman (2011), playing the lover of Xu Fan's character.

In 2013, he had a lead role in the biographical film, Falling Flowers.

In 2014, he played the male lead opposite Choo Ja-hyun in Xiu Xiu's Men.

Zhang appeared in the 2015 war television series The Waves, opposite Han Xue and Yin Xiaotian.

Zhang's big break in The Qin Empire III, in which he played King Zhaoxiang of Qin, a role which brought him much publicity. That same year, he played a supporting role in Nirvana in Fire sequel Nirvana in Fire 2, starring Huang Xiaoming, Liu Haoran, Tong Liya and Zhang Huiwen and directed by Kong Sheng and Li Xue.

In 2018, Zhang played King Wu of Zhou, the lead role in Shin Woo-chul's The Gods, costarring Wang Likun, Luo Jin and Yu Hewei.

== Filmography ==
=== Film ===
Year	English title	Chinese title	Role	Notes
2006	PK.COM.CN	PK.COM.CN	Alexander	
2006	Exchanging Feelings for Heart	谈谈心恋恋爱	Liu Hua	
2007	The Most Familiar Stranger	最熟悉的陌生人	Zheng Cheng	
2013	Falling Flowers	萧红	Luo Binji	

=== Television ===
Year	English title	Chinese title	Role	Notes
2000	Tianwang Qingwang	天网情网	Li Mu	
2004	The Legend of Love	我的武林男友	Yu Yongjing	
2004		天下第一媒婆	Murong Mingzhu	
2006	Where Is Happiness	幸福在哪里	Hao Jiajun	
2006	Full Spring Leaves	望春风	Fang Sijun	
2007	Rich Man Poor Love	钻石王老五的艰难爱情	Meng Wei	
2007	Dancer	舞者	Gu Zi	
2008		苍天	Li Guoliang	
2009	Li Bai	李白	Li Boqin	
2009	Biography of Sun Tsu	孙子大传	Goujian	
2010	Worrying	牵挂	Niu Jianjun	
2010	Scent of a Woman	青春四十	Li Xiaolong	
2010	The Lure of Cloud	云上的诱惑	Luo Kuang	
2010	The Firmament of The Pleiades	苍穹之昂	Guangxu Emperor	
2010	Three Kingdoms	三国	Sun Quan	
2011		天下人家	Lawyer Shen	
2011	Embarrassed People a Happy Life	囧人的幸福生活	Ma Xiaodong	
2011	War Does Not Believe in Tears	战争不相信眼泪	Gao Ningdu	
2013		绝命追踪	Liao Shenghui	
2013	The Battle of Thunder	战雷	Gao Deng	
2014	Out of Tongguan	出关	Liu Yishou	
2014	Xiu Xiu's Men	秀秀的男人	Shi Haisheng	
2014		金战尖兵	Qin Guoliang	
2015		王大花的革命生涯	Xia Jiahe	
2015	On Our Way Home	坐88路车回家	Gao Shan	
2015	The Waves	巨浪	Wu Hongyun	
2015	Fight Up	战寇	Chen Yu	
2016	The Distant Distance	遥远的距离	Zheng Xiangdong	
2017	The Qin Empire III	大秦帝国之崛起	King Zhaoxiang of Qin	
2017	Nirvana in Fire 2	琅琊榜之风起长林	Xun Feizhan	
2018	Genius Butler	天才管家	Zuo Fei	
2018	Pudong	大浦东	Zhao Haiying	
2018	The Gods	封神	King Wu of Zhou	
2018	Trouble Killer	谜·途	Li Yi	
2018		诚忠堂	Qiao Yingji	
