= Momo Love =

2009 Taiwanese television series

- Promotional poster
- Also known as: 桃花小妹; Táohuā Xiǎomèi
- Genre: Romance; Comedy; Harem
- Based on: Momoka Typhoon by Kazuko Fujita
- Directed by: Chu Yu-ning (瞿友寧)
- Starring: Jiro Wang; Cyndi Wang; Wong Jinglun; Calvin Chen; Ken Chu; Godfrey Gao
- Opening theme: "喜歡你怎麼辦" (What To Do That I Love You) by Cyndi Wang
- Ending theme: "很安靜" (Very Quiet) by Fahrenheit
- Country of origin: Taiwan
- Original language: Mandarin
- No. of episodes: 13

Production
- Producer: Wang Xin-gui
- Production location: Taiwan
- Production company: Comic International Productions

Original release
- Network: China Television (CTV)
- Release: 18 October 2009 – 10 January 2010

Related
- Boys Over Flowers; Down With Love

Momo Love (Chinese: 桃花小妹; pinyin: Táohuā Xiǎomèi) is a 2009 Taiwanese television series starring Jiro Wang and Calvin Chen, Cyndi Wang, Wong Jinglun and Ken Chu. It was produced by Comic International Productions and Gala Television (GTV) and directed by Chu Yu-ning. It is based on the Japanese manga series Momoka Typhoon (桃花タイフーン) by Kazuko Fujita.

The production was announced in a press conference on 17 June 2008 by GTV and originally titled Tao Hua Love Conquers All (Chinese: 桃花愛無敵), starring Aaron Yan, Gui Gui and Ah Ben of Choc7. However filming was postponed and subsequently re-cast. It resumed filming on 16 June 2009 and wrapped on 12 December 2009.

It was broadcast on free-to-air China Television (CTV) from 18 October 2009 to 10 January 2010, every Sunday at 22:00 to 23:30 and cable TV GTV Variety Show/CH 28 from 24 October 2009 to 16 January 2010, every Saturday at 21:00 to 22:30.

== Synopsis ==
Tao Hua (Cyndi Wang) is the youngest, and only girl, in a family of six children. Her four eldest brothers: Chen Qi (Ken Chu) a news weather anchor, Chen Cheng (Gaby Lan) a fashion stylist; Chen Zhuan (Ding Chun Cheng) and Chen He (Godfrey Gao) are twins. They are afraid that their place in her heart will diminish if she is to fall in love, they set stringent guidelines on whom she can date. They also force their youngest brother, Yu Yi (Wong Jinglun), to care and risk his life to protect her at all times and resort to making Yu Yi stay in high school for an additional year in order to protect Tao Hua.

Shi Lang (Jiro Wang) recently moved into Tao Hua's area and attends a school nearby with high academic standards. Shi Lang and Tao Hua meet on a rainy day, during which Tao Hua falls in love with him after he gives her his umbrella, thinking that he has a big heart. Until Shi Lang comes into the picture, no guy has passed all of the guidelines set by the brothers. Despite Shi Lang's clean track record, the brothers are still unwilling to let go of their sister. They also "hire" Xue Zhi Qiang (Calvin Chen) to distract Tao Hua from Shi Lang, believing Zhi Qiang's lie about being in love with Yu Yi. They even go as far as to write up a script for a date so that Tao Hua will hopefully fall for Zhi Qiang, which results in confusion and sadness for everyone. Not only is Tao Hua hindered by her brothers, but she is also competing for Shi Lang's affections with his childhood friend, Gong Hui Qi. The two main conflicts of the story consist of Tao Hua's struggle to prove that she can be independent as well as whether or not Shi Lang likes Tao Hua.

== Cast ==
Actor	Character	Description
Jiro Wang	Shi Lang	
Cyndi Wang	Chen Tao Hua	
Calvin Chen	Xue Zhi Qiang	Shi Lang's rival
Wong Jinglun	Chen Yu Yi	Tao Hua's 5th brother
Ken Chu	Chen Qi	Tao Hua's eldest brother
Gaby Lan	Chen Cheng	Tao Hua's 2nd brother
Ding Chun Cheng	Chen Zhuan	Tao Hua's 3rd brother
Godfrey Gao	Chen He	Tao Hua's 4th brother
Chloe Wang	Shi Xue	Shi Lang's cousin
Honduras	Shi Lang papa	Shi Lang's father
Shadya Lan	Shi Lang mama	Shi Lang's mother
Li Jia Ying	Gong Hui Qi	Shi Lang's childhood friend
Xie Yuwei	Tao Hua papa	Tao Hua's father
Yú Mĕi Rén	Tao Hua mama	Tao Hua's mother
CY Ling	Xue Zhi Qiang papa	Xue Zhi Qiang's father
Wu Fei Li	Xiăo Mĭ	Tao Hua's friend
Annie Chen	Zhang Kaili	Chen Qi's girlfriend
Jam Hsiao	himself	Guest star (ep 8)
River Huang	Young Chen Chi	
Summer Meng	Young Chao Ko-jou	Cameo

=== Characters ===
Tao Hua

The youngest sibling in a large family, Tao Hua has grown up under the care of her brothers because her parents are away. She has never been in a relationship and struggles to woo Shi Lang. Her personality is childish yet sweet and innocent, which comprises her main draw factor. Tao Hua's athletic abilities are superior to those of Hui Qi. In fact, Tao Hua has learned judo from a young age, beating both Shi Lang and Zhi Qiang in combat despite her slight frame. While she has been wooed by many admirers, her brothers have "taken out" all the guys who have not met their requirements. In order to be in the same school as Shi Lang, Tao Hua takes the entrance exam to transfer. Eventually, Tao Hua, Yu Yi, Zhi Qiang, and Hui Qi are the four students selected to enter the school.

Shi Lang

Shi Lang has many achievements under his name in academic and athletic areas. He is the first to successfully meet the standards of Tao Hua's brothers, yet the brothers seem to find him inadequate for an unspecified reason. His handsome looks and kind heart make him very popular among the girls at school, yet he does not seem to have any girl friends outside of Tao Hua and Hui Qi. While he looks strong outwardly, Shi Lang struggles to decide his own feelings for both girls. His warm personality is tempered by his shyness. As the story progresses, it becomes apparent that he has feelings for Tao Hua; eventually, he gathers the courage to face his emotions.

Hui Qi

Hui Qi is Tao Hua's main competitor for Shi Lang's affections. She has known Shi Lang from a young age and believes that she is his future bride. She often fakes sickness in order to grab Shi Lang's attention from Tao Hua. Hui Qi seems to be developing a relationship with Chen He, although her feelings are ambiguous at best. Hui Qi has had poor health since a young age and cannot compete with Tao Hua athletically. Hui Qi is very ambitious and "declares war" on Tao Hua openly. Yu Yi falls in love with Hui Qi and she kept on rejecting him, but in the end she accepts him.

Zhi Qiang

Zhi Qiang began liking Tao Hua after seeing her resilience and perseverance in pursuing Shi Lang. He uses various antics as to win Tao Hua's heart. Like Shi Lang, Zhi Qiang is also admired by many girls at school. While Shi Lang seems to lack the courage to tell Tao Hua of his affections, Zhi Qiang is very open. Zhi Qiang wins the support of Tao Hua's brothers by pretending that he really does not have any feelings for Tao Hua. He teams up with Hui Qi and the four brothers to separate Tao Hua and Shi Lang. Zhi Qiang is hot-blooded and romantic. Zhi Qiang's father is the director of a large television company and is actually Chen Qi's boss. His father then uses his position to indirectly forcing Tao Hua to become engaged with Zhi Qiang. In the past, Zhi Qiang was faced with the problem of keeping a girlfriend because of his aging father's wish to have grandchildren.

Yu Yi

Yu Yi is actually quite gifted, but as the youngest brother, he feels inferior to his brilliant brothers. He desires to have a relationship with a girl, currently hoping for the girl to be Hui Qi. Yu Yi's life has been plagued with difficulty due to his brothers. The brothers use Yu Yi as a tool to spy on and protect Tao Hua. While Yu Yi's problems stem from Tao Hua, Tao Hua is the only one who understands him and tries to help Yu Yi. In order to protect Tao Hua, Yu Yi had to be intentionally held back in school and now is delaying college to go to school with Tao Hua yet again.

Shi Xue

Shi Xue is Shi Lang's cousin and takes care of Shi Lang when Shi Lang's mother died, as well as comforting him when he was young. She initially disagreed Shi Lang to be with Tao Hua as she felt that Tao Hua is too dependent of her brothers. Shi Xue later fell in love with Chen Cheng, Tao Hua's second brother.

== Love triangle ==
Shi Lang and Tao Hua

On Tao Hua's part, she seems to truly be engrossed in Shi Lang and is eager to become his girlfriend. She accidentally confesses her love for him and has yet to receive a solid answer. At this point, Shi Lang seems to be the primary problem because he does not seem to know how to face having a relationship. Nevertheless, Shi Lang appears to like Tao Hua more as their friendship progresses. He even appears to be jealous of any guys who approach Tao Hua, particularly Xue Zhi Qiang. In order to see Shi Lang more often, Tao Hua took the entrance exam to his school.

Shi Lang and Hui Qi

Shi Lang and Hui Qi have been best friends from their childhood days. In their childhood, Shi Lang had asked Hui Qi to marry him. While Shi Lang feels that the "proposal" was of no consequence, Hui Qi still believes it to be valid. Hui Qi has recently moved across the street from Tao Hua and also tested into Shi Lang's school. She has openly admitted that she likes Shi Lang, going so far as to kiss him. Like in Tao Hua's case, Shi Lang does not know how to respond to her affections—so her confession goes unanswered as well.

Tao Hua and Zhi Qiang

While Tao Hua is slightly annoyed by his presence, Zhi Qiang thinks that she is the girl of his dreams. Zhi Qiang outwits the four brothers with Hui Qi's help and steals Tao Hua's "first" kiss from under Shi Lang's nose (her actual first kiss was accidental at a judo match with Shi Lang). Zhi Qiang's father blackmails Tao Hua into agreeing to an engagement with Zhi Qiang - creating further struggles between the two. Zhi Qiang appears to realize that Tao Hua does not like him in a romantic way, yet he is willing to put forth the effort to win her without blackmailing.

== Music ==
- Opening theme song: "喜歡你怎麼辦" (What To Do That I Love You) by Cyndi Wang
- Ending theme song: "很安靜" (Very Quiet) by Fahrenheit – composed by Tank – released on Super Hot

Insert songs

- "小星星" (Little Stars) by Cyndi Wang
- "我的媽" (My Mother) by Wong Jinglun – released on OK Man
- "鹹魚" (Salted Fish) by Wong JingLun – released on OK Man

== Reception ==
China Television (CTV) (中視) Ratings
Episode	Original Broadcast Date	Average	Rank	Remarks
1	18 October 2009	1.95	2	
2	25 October 2009	1.48	2	Hi My Sweetheart BTS Special
3	1 November 2009	1.26	3	105 mins
4	8 November 2009	1.10	3	105 mins
5	15 November 2009	1.04	3	105 mins
6	22 November 2009	0.91	3	105 mins
7	29 November 2009	0.94	3	105 mins
8	6 December 2009	0.67	3	105 mins
9	13 December 2009	0.69	3	105 mins
10	20 December 2009	0.84	3	105 mins
11	27 December 2009	0.67	3	120 mins
12	3 January 2010	0.76	3	120 mins
13	10 January 2010	0.69	3	120 mins
Average		1.00	3	

Source：China Times

Rival dramas on air at the same time：

- Taiwan Television (TTV) (台視): Autumn's Concerto (下一站，幸福)
- Chinese Television System (CTS) (華視): Hi My Sweetheart (海派甜心)

== International broadcast ==
It aired in Thailand on Channel 3 from June 22 to July 21, 2013.
