= Godfrey Gao =

Taiwanese-Canadian model and actor (1984–2019)

- 高以翔
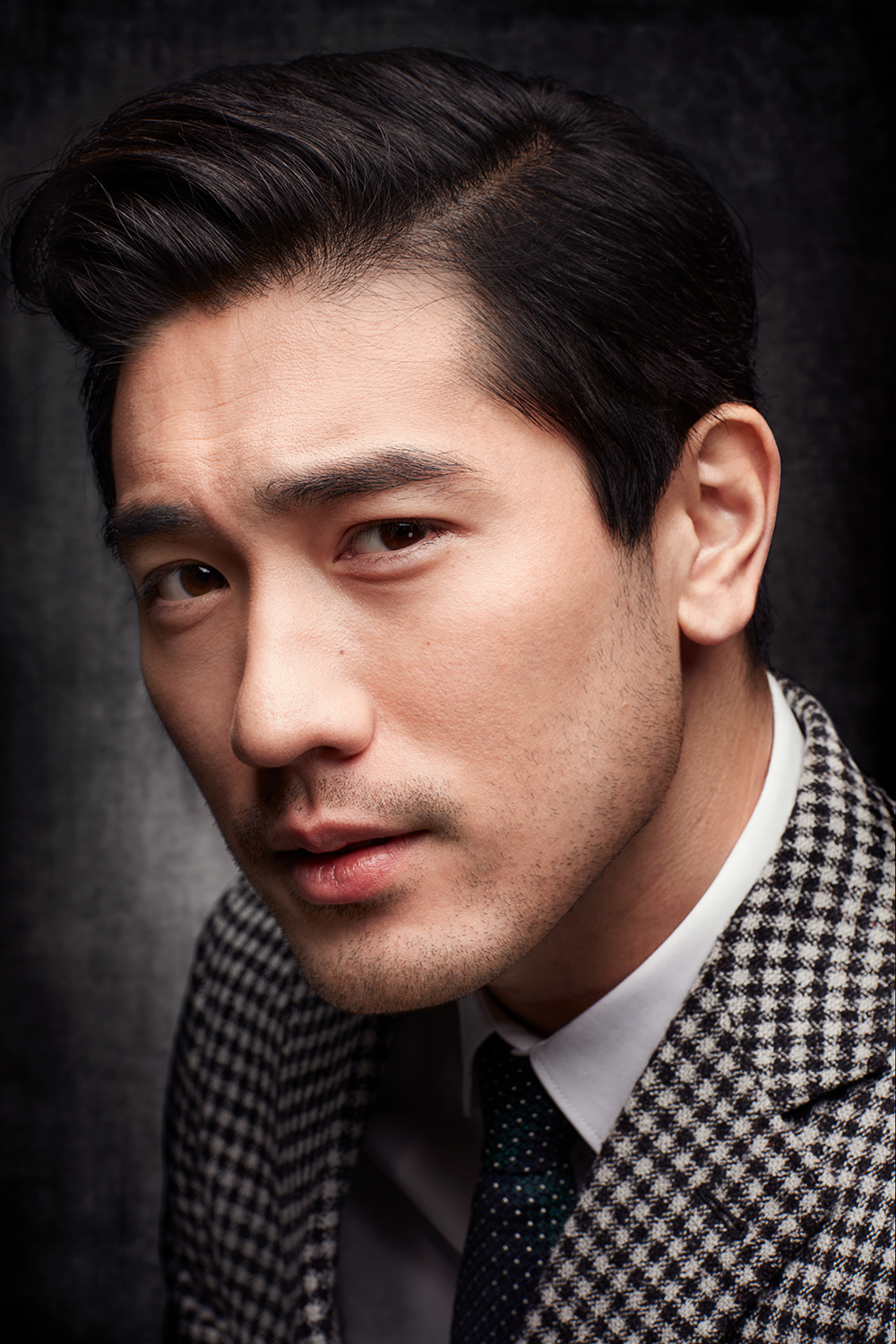
- Gao in 2017
- Born: Tsao Chih-hsiang (曹志翔); 22 September 1984; Taipei, Taiwan
- Died: 27 November 2019 (aged 35); Ningbo, China
- Cause of death: Cardiac arrest
- Resting place: Chin Pao San, Jinshan District, New Taipei City
- Other names: Godfrey Tsao; Gao Yixiang; Kao Yi-hsiang
- Education: Capilano University
- Occupations: Actor; model
- Years active: 2004–2019
- Height: 1.93 m (6 ft 4 in)

Chinese name
- Chinese: 高以翔
Transcriptions
Standard Mandarin
- Hanyu Pinyin: Gāo Yǐxiáng
- IPA: [kǎʊ ì.ɕjǎŋ]
Southern Min
- Hokkien POJ: Ko Í-siông

Birth name
- Chinese: 曹志翔
Transcriptions
Standard Mandarin
- Hanyu Pinyin: Cáo Zhìxiáng
- Wade–Giles: Tsʻao^{2} Chih^{4}-hsiang^{2}
- IPA: [tsʰǎʊ ʈʂî.ɕjǎŋ]
Southern Min
- Hokkien POJ: Chô Chì-siông

Godfrey Gao (Chinese: 高以翔; pinyin: Gāo Yǐxiáng; Pe̍h-ōe-jī: Ko Í-siông; 22 September 1984 – 27 November 2019), born Tsao Chih-hsiang (Chinese: 曹志翔; pinyin: Cáo Zhìxiáng; Pe̍h-ōe-jī: Chô Chì-siông), was a Taiwanese-Canadian model and actor. Described as Asia's first male supermodel, Gao was the first Asian male model featured in a Louis Vuitton campaign. As an actor, he was known for his roles as Magnus Bane in the film adaptation of The Mortal Instruments: City of Bones (2013) and as Wang Lichuan in the Chinese television series Remembering Lichuan (2016).

== Early life ==
Gao was born in Taipei on 22 September 1984. Gao's father was a Taiwanese of Shanghainese descent, and worked as a general manager at Michelin Taiwan; his mother was a Malaysian of Peranakan Chinese descent from George Town who won the Miss Penang beauty pageant in 1970. The youngest of three boys, Gao moved with his family to North Vancouver, British Columbia, Canada, where his parents raised their boys during his childhood. He attended Queensbury Elementary School and Argyle Secondary School, and later studied at Capilano University where the 6-foot-4-inch (1.93 m) Gao played basketball for the school's team.

== Career ==
Gao returned to Taiwan to work as a model in 2004, and was managed by JetStar Entertainment. Gao and fellow male models Sphinx Ting, Victor Chen, and Lan Chun-tien were collectively nicknamed the "Fashion F4", and jointly released a book in 2009. In 2011, he became the first Asian male model for Louis Vuitton.

Gao began appearing in minor roles in Chinese television dramas in 2006, and had his first starring role in the 2010 television drama Volleyball Lover. In 2013, he made his American film debut as Magnus Bane in the film adaption of The Mortal Instruments: City of Bones. His starring role in the 2016 drama Remembering Lichuan (alongside Jiao Junyan, and others) was widely acclaimed and earned him the nickname of the "nation's husband" in Chinese media. Gao's other notable credits include the 2015 film Wedding Bible alongside Korean actress Yoo In-na, and the 2017 romantic comedy film Love is a Broadway Hit, alongside Wang Likun, Wang Chuanjun, Yuan Li and Naren Weiss.

== Death ==
On 27 November 2019, Gao collapsed in Ningbo while filming Chase Me, a sports reality television series broadcast on Zhejiang Television. He was taken to a hospital, where after attempts at resuscitation for nearly three hours, he was pronounced dead. His agency JetStar Entertainment published the death announcement on Sina Weibo. The producers of Chase Me said in a statement that Gao died from cardiac arrest.

Gao's death prompted increased scrutiny of the series, which involves contestants competing in physically strenuous challenges late at night, and of the safety standards of Chinese reality television productions more broadly. Gao had reportedly been filming for 17 hours at the time of his collapse; actor and director Xu Zheng stated that the series' producers "must be held responsible" for what he claimed were poor health and safety conditions. In a statement on Sina Weibo, Zhejiang Television stated that they were "deeply regretful and sorry for the irreparable and serious consequences that this incident has caused, and are willing to take up responsibility."

Gao's body was moved to a funeral home in Ningbo on 28 November 2019, and returned to Taiwan on 2 December 2019. Gao's funeral, a Buddhist ceremony per the request of Gao's mother, was held in Taiwan on 15 December 2019. His remains are interred at Chin Pao San.

== Filmography ==
=== Film ===
Title	Year	Role	Notes	Ref.
All About Women	2008	X		
Toy Story 3	2010	Ken (Note: Mandarin voice-over for Taiwan release.)	Mandarin version, Voice	
101 Proposals	2013	Xu Zhuo	Main role	
The Mortal Instruments: City of Bones	2013	Magnus Bane	Supporting role	
Wedding Bible	2015	Chikai	Main role	
Min & Max	2016	Zhang Xiao	Main role	
My Other Home	2017	Yang Xi Ya	Supporting role	
Love is a Broadway Hit	2017	Song Wei Dong	Main role	
The Jade Pendant	2017	Tom	Main role	
Legend of the Ancient Sword	2018	Xia Yize	Main role	
Shanghai Fortress	2019	Yang Jiannan	Supporting role	
Lost in Russia	2020	Michael	Cameo	

=== Television series ===
Title	Year	Role	Notes	Ref.
The Kid from Heaven	2006	Luo Yixiang	Second Lead	
Chao Ji Pai Tang Super	2006	Big Mac	Cameo	
Love Queen	2006	Wang Zhixun	Second Lead	
The Magicians of Love	2006	Xiao Ling's boyfriend	Cameo	
I Want To Become A Hard Persimmon	2007	Luo Xin Hu/Tiger	Supporting role	
Bull Fighting	2007	Tank	Supporting role	
Momo Love	2009	Chen He	Supporting role	
Volleyball Lover	2010	Bai Qian Rui	Main role	
Odd Perfect Match	2010	Ying Kai Tai	Main role	
The Queen of SOP	2012	Gao Zi Qi	Main role	
Hello Gorgeous	2013	Li Zhen	Main role	
Never Give Up Dodo	2013	Xiu Fei	Main role	
Only If I Love You	2014	Yan Jun	Special guest Ep. 1, 4, 5, 10–12 & 20	
God of War, Zhao Yun	2015	Lü Bu	Supporting role Ep. 1, 2, 4, 7–11, 16, 19, 25, 30, 31 & 36	
Remembering Lichuan	2016	Wang Lichuan	Main role	
The Gravity of a Rainbow	2019	Ji Huang	Main role	
We Are All Alone	2020	Mo Bei	Main role	
We Are All Alone: Special	2020	Mo Bei	Main role	

== Awards ==
Year	Nominated work	Category	Award	Result	Notes	Ref.
2017	The Jade Pendant	Most Popular Actor	Golden Angel Awards	Won		
