= Sphinx Ting =

Taiwanese actor and male model

Sphinx Ting or Ting Chun-cheng (Chinese: 丁春誠; pinyin: Dīng Chūnchéng) is a Taiwanese actor and male model. TV series and music videos. He has earned the title "fashion 4" (shortened to F4) due to his fashion experience with Godfrey Gao, Victor, and Gaby. They made a show for YKsuit in winter of 2008. In 2009, the four published a book meet fashion 4. He also has his own brand: "Doris Bella".

Ding was born in a rich family. His father Ding Sanguang owns a giant company. The first magazine he shot was CQ which fulfilled his childhood dreams.

== Filmography ==
=== TV series ===
Year	Name	Chinese name	Role
2007	Bull Fighting (TV series)	鬥牛要不要	Roma
2009	Momo Love	桃花小妹	Chen Zhuan
2010	Love in Taichung	愛在台中	Fang Yasi
2010	4 Gifts	女王不下班	Zhangyang
2011	Zhen Ai Bei Ling	珍愛北林	Dan Bang Wang
2019	River Flows To You		
2020	Futmalls.com	預支未來	Zhuang Yun
2023	Oh No! Here Comes Trouble	不良執念清除師	Xie Hui

=== Films ===
Year	Title
2011	Shadows of Love
2014	Bugs
2015	Detective Gui
2018	Love, What Do You Want to Say?

== Music videos ==
- S.H.E MV Can't Find It(找不到) (2004)
- Gigi Leung MV The Love Song For Myself''(给自己的情歌) (2006)
- Joey Yung MV Milk(牛奶) (2007)
- A-Lin MV Before and After(以前以后) (2009)
- Jam Hsiao MV How Can I Say Love (怎么说我不爱你) (2009)
- Landy Wen MV Don't love me (2009)

== TV programs ==
- 2006/01/29 Mala PALACE theme: date with actoress section B
- 2006/06/21 Mala PALACE theme: super hot male model
- 2006/10/24 The Handsome Chief
- 2006/10/26 The Handsome Chief
- 2007/01/10 Mala PALACE theme: the superstar in rich family
- 2008/02/01 Shen Chunhua lifeshow
- 2008/05/07 Kang Xi is Coming theme: My classmates are rich people
- 2008/05/29 Three Pigs theme:Let's make friends with Fashion 4
- 2008/06/10 Kang Xi is Coming theme:Fashion 4
- 2008/08/04 Make a Wish theme:let's have a summer holiday
- 2008/09/04 As a College Studenttheme:We also have tough time
- 2009/04/17 I Love Black Group
- 2009/04/24 Helping Guo Guang
- 2009/05/02 Guess!Guess!Guess! theme:Barbie
- 2009/05/08 Challenge 101
- 2009/05/12 Kang Xi is Coming theme: Help us in Fellowship
- 2009/10/14 Kang Xi is Coming theme: MOMO LOVE
- 2009/10/21 As a College Studenttheme:How to find true love
- 2009/10/27 Awarding
- 2009/10/29 Entertainment for 100%
- 2009/12/05 Enjoy Your Weekendtheme:Bling Bling things
- 2010/03/04 Kang Xi is Coming theme: Speak out your love
- 2010/03/05 Million of Class
- 2010/10/20 SS Night of Yan sister
