= Momoka Typhoon =

Japanese manga series

桃花タイフーン!!
- Manga
- Written by: Kazuko Fujita
- Published by: Shogakukan
- Imprint: Flower Comics
- Magazine: Shōjo Comic
- Original run: 1987 – 1989
- Volumes: 7
- Television drama
- Momo Love (2009–2010)

Momoka Typhoon (桃花タイフーン!!) is a Japanese shōjo manga series written and illustrated by Kazuko Fujita. It was serialized in Shogakukan's manga magazine Shōjo Comic from 1987 to 1989. Shogakukan collected the manga into seven volumes under its Flower Comics label from January 1988 to July 1989. It was adapted into the Taiwanese drama Momo Love in 2009.
