= OK Man =

- OK Man cover

Studio album by Wong JingLun
- Released: 11 December 2009
- Genre: Mandopop
- Language: Mandarin
- Label: Warner Music Taiwan

Wong JingLun chronology
Jing's Note (2008)	OK Man (2009)

OK Man is Singaporean Mandopop artist Wong JingLun's second Mandarin studio album. It was released on 11 December 2009 by Warner Music Taiwan.

The album includes two insert songs from Taiwanese drama Momo Love, starring Jiro Wang and Calvin Chen of Fahrenheit, Cyndi Wang, Wong JingLun and Ken Chu of F4. The track "我的媽" (My Mother) is written by Golden Melody Award winner and songwriter Di Zi (Chinese: 阿弟仔).

== Track listing ==
1. "我的媽" (My Mother) - insert song for Momo Love
2. "OK Man"
3. "透明人" (Invisible Man)
4. "我會一直記得" (I Will Remember)
5. "鹹魚" (Salted Fish) - insert song for Momo Love
6. "舊傷" (Old Hurt)
7. "我們的show" (Our Show)
8. "心碎雨" (Heart Break Rain)
9. "怎麼愛都累" (How To Love)
10. "敵不過" (No Match)
