= Jing's Note =

- Jing's Note cover

Studio album 倫語錄 by Wong JingLun
- Released: 14 November 2008
- Genre: Mandopop
- Language: Mandarin
- Label: Warner Music Taiwan

Wong JingLun chronology
Jing's Note (2008)	OK Man (2009)

Jing's Note (Chinese: 倫語錄) is Singaporean Mandopop artist Wong JingLun's debut Mandarin solo studio album. It was released on 14 November 2008 by Warner Music Taiwan. A second edition was released on 12 December 2008, Jing's Note (Wish Your Love MV Limited Edition) (倫語錄 Wish Your Love 影音限定版) with a bonus DVD containing three music videos, and other behind-the-scene footage.

== Track listing ==
1. "每日一句" (Every day a Sentence)
2. "月光" (Moonlight)
3. "缺席" (Absent)
4. "明天再說" (Talk about it Tomorrow)
5. "慢半拍" (Half-Beat Slower)
6. "我的天" (Oh My God)
7. "懶" (Lazy)
8. "走音" (Off-Key)
9. "白日夢" (Daydream)
10. "傻裡傻氣" (Silly)

== Music videos ==
- "缺席" (Absent) MV
- "月光" (Moonlight) MV - feat Chie Tanaka
- "慢半拍" (Half-Beat Slower) MV - feat Xiao Xun of Hey Girl
