= Investiture of the Gods (2019 TV series) =

- Promotional poster
- Chinese: 封神演义
- Hanyu Pinyin: Fēngshén
- Genre: Historical, shenmo
- Based on: Investiture of the Gods by Xu Zhonglin and Lu Xixing
- Written by: Zhu Sujin
- Directed by: Shin Woo-chul
- Starring: Wang Likun; Luo Jin; Zhang Bo; Yu Hewei; Deng Lun; Collin Chou
- Country of origin: China
- Original language: Mandarin
- No. of seasons: 1
- No. of episodes: 65

Production
- Executive producers: He Jin; Yang Xiaoming
- Production location: Hengdian World Studio
- Production companies: Mango Studio; Samhwa Networks; Cathay Media Group; China Television Production Center; CCTV

Original release
- Network: Hunan Television
- Release: April 8, 2019

Investiture of the Gods (Chinese: 封神演义) is a 2019 Chinese shenmo television series loosely based on the 16th-century Chinese gods and demons fiction Investiture of the Gods by Xu Zhonglin and Lu Xixing. The series is directed by Korean director Shin Woo-chul and starring Wang Likun, Luo Jin, Zhang Bo, Yu Hewei, Deng Lun, and Collin Chou. Produced by Mango Studio, Cathay Media Group, China Television Production Center and China Central Television (CCTV), Investiture of the Gods aired on Hunan Television in April 2019. The series followed the love story between Erlang Shen and Daji in the two rival countries Shang and Western Zhou.

== Synopsis ==
Daji (Wang Likun) and Yang Jian (Luo Jin) are close friends, they love each other since their childhood. Their whole life is changed when the tyrannical King Zhou of Shang (Collin Chou) kills their parents and destroys their hometown. Vowing revenge, beautiful Daji joins the royal harem, seeking to topple the kingdom from the inside. Meanwhile, Yuanshi Tianzun sends his disciples Jiang Ziya (Yu Hewei) and Shen Gongbao (Hai Yitian) to save the oppressed people. Jiang Ziya takes Yang Jian as a disciple, agreeing to teach him how to control his magical Eye of Heaven, and bring about the end of the Shang dynasty.

== Cast ==
=== Main ===
- Wang Likun as Daji, Yang Jian's adoptive sister and consort to King Zhou of Shang.
- Luo Jin as Yang Jian, Erlang Shen.
- Zhang Bo as Ji Fa, King Wu of Zhou.
- Yu Hewei as Jiang Ziya, immortal disciple of Yuanshi Tianzun and Yang Jian's master.
- Deng Lun as Zi Xu, King of fox demons.
- Collin Chou as King Zhou of Shang.

=== Supporting ===
- Hu Jing as Empress Jiang, wife of King Zhou of Shang.
- Hai Yitian as Shen Gongbao, prime minister of Shang.
- Yu Yankai as Huang Feihu
- He Dujuan as Tian Xiao'e
- Huang Jingchun as Cai Xia, a little fox demon.
- Jin Jiangri as Fei Zhong, a minister in the government of Shang.
- Liu Zikai as You Hun, a minister in the government of Shang.
- Jin Feng as Consort Yang, a consort of King Zhou of Shang.
- Wang Ziqi as Consort Huang, younger sister of Huang Feihu, a consort of King Zhou of Shang.
- Bai Shan as Lady Su, mother of Daiji
- Qi Hang as Bo Yikao, elder brother of Ji Fa, oldest son of King Wen of Zhou.
- He Zhonghua as Yang Zicheng, father of Yang Jian.
- Liu Tianyue as Lady Yang, mother of Yang Jian.
- Zhang Haiyan as Lady Jiang, wife of Jiang Ziya.
- Guo Yuanyuan as Lan Ying, daughter of Jiang Ziya.
- Qian Duoduo as Lady Lüqiu, younger sister of Fei Zhong.

== Music ==
No.	Title	Lyrics	Music	Singers	Length
1.	"Heroes (封神英雄)" (Ending theme)	Cheng Xi	Dong Dongdong	Liu Huan

== Production ==
Korean director Shin Woo-chul was signed to direct the series from a script by Zhu Sujin.

Flying Apsaras Award winner Yang Shudong (杨树栋) joined the project as the chief makeup artist. Chen Tongxun (陈同勋), the fashion designer who won a Golden Horse Award for 2008 biographical film Forever Enthralled, was hired as the costume designer. Han Zhong (韩忠), an art designer acclaimed for The Wasted Times, was confirmed as art designer.

Principal photography started on March 18, 2015 and wrapped on August 18, 2015.
