= Makoto Call! =

Japanese manga series

- Makoto Call! Volume 1 as published by Shogakukan

真コール! (Makoto Kōru!)
- Genre: Sports (volleyball)
- Manga
- Written by: Kazuko Fujita
- Published by: Shogakukan
- Magazine: Shōjo Comic
- Original run: 1990 – 1992
- Volumes: 9

Makoto Call! (真コール!, Makoto Kōru!; "Makoto Shout!") is a Japanese shōjo manga series by Kazuko Fujita. The series first appeared in July 1990 on the 15th issue of the semimonthly Shōjo Comic. It won the 37th Shogakukan Manga Award for shōjo. While shōjo, the series has elements of classical sports manga like player rivalry and special attacks.

The series is about high-school student Fujisaki Makoto, a figure skater who returns from Canada to Japan. As the result of a random encounter with her new school's volleyball team, she joins the team, and with her help they are able to hold off (but still loses at the end) to high school championships favorites led by Hitomi Kanou. There begins Fujisaki's road to stardom and Barcelona.

== Main characters ==
Makoto Fujisaki (藤咲 真, Fujisaki Makoto)
The protagonist. As a former figure skater, she is a gifted athlete and quickly learns volleyball skills even with no prior experience. She stands 172 cm tall.
Hayato Watanabe (渡辺 隼人, Watanabe Hayato)
A childhood friend of Makoto, he is an amateur photographer.
Coach Kazuhiko Maki (コーチ 万紀 一彦)
The new coach of the school volleyball team and a former Japan National Team player. He stands about 190 cm tall.
Hitomi Kanou (加納 仁実, Kanō Hitomi)
The star of the Tōyō High School's volleyball team and Makoto's rival.

== Manga ==
Makoto Call! was written and illustrated by Kazuko Fujita. It was serialized in the shōjo manga magazine Shōjo Comic from 1990 to 1992, and collected in nine tankōbon volumes by Shogakukan under the Flower Comics imprint. It was reprinted in 2003 in four bunkoban volumes.

No.	Release date	ISBN
1	January 1991	4-09-133591-8
2	February 1991	4-09-133592-6
3	June 1991	4-09-133593-4
4	September 1991	4-09-133594-2
5	December 1991	4-09-133595-0
6	March 1992	4-09-133596-9
7	June 1992	4-09-133597-7
8	September 1992	4-09-133598-5
9	November 1992	4-09-133599-3
