= Never Give Up Dodo =

- Promo poster
- Also known as: Duo Duo’s Love Story, 錢多多煉愛記
- 钱多多炼爱记
- Genre: Romance, Comedy
- Created by: http://tv.sohu.com/
- Directed by: Lin Xiao Qian 林孝谦
- Starring: Godfrey Gao 高以翔; Yin Hang 尹航
- Opening theme: Love Story 炼爱记 by Yì Guang Nian 毅光年 &
- Ending theme: Your Favorite 最喜欢的你 by Misi Ke 柯泯熏
- Country of origin: China
- Original language: Mandarin
- No. of series: 1
- No. of episodes: 10

Production
- Producer: Chen Zheng Dao 陈正道
- Production locations: Shanghai, China
- Running time: approx. 20 minutes
- Production company: tv.sohu

Original release
- Network: tv.sohu
- Release: 22 October – 24 December 2013

Never Give Up Dodo aka Duo Duo's Love Story (simplified Chinese: 钱多多炼爱记; traditional Chinese: 錢多多煉愛記; pinyin: Qian Duo Duo Lian Ai Jì) is a 2013 Chinese romance, comedy and urban web series produced by Sohu TV. It stars Taiwanese actor Godfrey Gao and newcomer Chinese actress Yin Hang in her first lead role. Filmed on location in Shanghai China, the series began airing on October 22, 2013 on Sohu TV's website tv.sohu.com and finished airing on December 24, 2013 with 10 episodes total. Each episodes running time is approximately 20 minutes long.

== Synopsis ==
The series is a raunchy romantic comedy about a couple, Dodo and Xu Fei, who decide to get married but face many obstacles to happiness.

Dodo (Yin Hang) is engaged to her former co-worker Xu Fei (Godfrey Gao) but she is afraid this engagement won't last since her previous two engagements ended in disaster with her groom-to-be always leaving her for someone else just when they're about to get married. When Dodo was younger she reported a fortune teller to law enforcement's saying the fortune teller was a fraud, the fortune teller was arrested and cursed that Dodo well never get married. Dodo and Xu Fei move in together before their marriage, each guest that stays over at their home is a test to their relationship. Will Dodo and Xu Fei make it to their wedding day?

== Cast ==
=== Main cast ===
- Yin Hang 尹航 as Qian Duo Duo 钱多多 (Dodo)

Xu Fei's fiancee. She is constantly made fun of for being flat chested. She loves Xu Fei but still has trust issues with him because of his past lifestyle and immaturity. A fortune teller cursed that she would remain single forever because when she was younger she reported the fortune teller to law enforcement's by telling them that the fortune teller was a fraud, due to her not liking the fortune reading she received. Her first two engagements ended in disaster. Her first engagement, the groom ran off with her maid of honor. Her second engagement was to a foreigner who later decided to marry a woman that was the same race as him.

- Godfrey Gao 高以翔 as Xu Fei 许飞

Dodo's fiancee and former co-worker. He recently quit his job to start his own company. He loves Dodo a lot but can be immature and clueless. He is very tall and handsome. He doesn't understand why Dodo gets jealous when he interacts with other females or keep in contact with his ex-girlfriends, but he does show his jealous side when she interacts with other guys or is in contact with her former fiancee. He likes to have foreplay with Dodo.

=== Supporting cast ===
Note: According to appearance.

- Evonne Xie 谢依霖 as Jiang Miao Miao 姜淼淼

The fortune teller who curses Dodo to be single forever. Dodo went along with a friend to have her fortune read when she was in college because she didn't like the reading she received she reported Miao Miao to the authorities.

- Li Yuan 李媛 as Sun Qing Qing 孙青青

Dodo's boss and best friend. Xu Fei's former boss. She's in an unhappy marriage where she and her husband constantly argue about everything. She gives advice to Dodo when needed.

- Mike Sui 隋凯 as Li Dong 黎东

Dodo's former foreign fiancée. He recently got divorced and ends up purchasing the same apartment Dodo and Xu Fei brought. He wants Dodo back in his life, to do so he invites all kinds of strange females to the apartment that he, Dodo and Xu Fei share to see if Dodo still cares about him.

- Cica Zhou 周韦彤 as At Chun Hua 于春花

Xu Fei's former girlfriend. Dodo and Xu Fei moved into her home when they couldn't take Li Dong's antics anymore. Dodo originally thought she was an ugly duckling that's why she agreed to move to her house but she turned out to be a bosomy hot chick who's also a great cook, which makes Dodo feel insecure.

- Sunny Wang 王阳明 as Li Tong 李桐

Xu Fei's best friend and former college roommate. He comes for a visit and stays at Dodo and Xu Fei's home. Dodo thinks he's trying to come on to her because of the way he acts towards her.

- Han Zhi Shuo 韩志硕 as Xiang Yu 尚宇

A man Dodo meets at a night club and almost has a one-night stand with to get back at Xu Fei for his past lifestyle.

- Dong Xian 董娴 as Xu Zhen Zhen 许珍珍

Xu Fei's oldest sister. She's the authority in the family. She has a constipation problem which cause her to have a swollen appearance. She has never been married.

- Wei Xiao Yu 卫小雨 as Xu Ai Ai 许爱爱

Xu Fei's second-oldest sister. She is the beauty of the family. She's pregnant but not married at the moment.

- Ta Lin Fu 塔林夫 as Xu Yun Yun 许云云

Xu Fei's younger brother. He's very feminine and flamboyant. He likes to wear wigs and dress like a woman. He also has a foot odor problem.

- Zhao Lei Qi 赵雷琪 as Lao Meng 老孟

Sun Qing Qing's husband and Xu Fei's friend. He and Qing Qing were in a loving marriage but due to arguments over finances they've became bitter of each other and later separate.

- Dani 朱丹 as Wu Di 吴狄

Xu Fei's lawyer. He hires her to represent him when he and Dodo can't come to agreeing terms on their prenuptial agreement.

- Yan Feng 严丰 as Lawyer Cheung 张律师

Dodo's lawyer. She hires him to represent her during her and Xu Fei prenuptial agreement terms.

- Tang Dan Ni 唐丹尼 as Lawyer Li 李律师

Dodo's lawyer. She hires her to represent her during her and Xu Fei prenuptial agreement terms.

- Xie Bo 谢波 Wang Jia Bao 王家宝

Dodo's high school classmate. He has a crush on Dodo because she saved him from drowning in high school. He thinks Dodo didn't like him back in high school because he was short and fat. Even though he is still short and fat he tries to pursue her before he gets married because he is rich now.

- Zhao Yi Huan 赵奕欢 as Xuan Xuan 萱萱

Dodo's younger cousin. She tries to seduce Xu Fei but it turns out to be a test set up by Dodo.

=== Various characters ===
Note: The following actors play various different characters in each episode of the series.

- Jīn Da Zhou 金大洲
- Bud Bud Shi 蓓蓓饰

== Production Team ==
- Producer:
  - Chen Zheng Dao 陈正道
- Director:
  - Lin Xiao Qian 林孝谦
- Production Company :
  - tv.sohu 搜狐视频
