= Love Is a Broadway Hit =

Love is a Broadway Hit
- Directed by: Peter Lee
- Written by: Peter Lee
- Starring: Godfrey Gao; Wang Likun; Wang Chuanjun; Li Yuan (李媛); Naren Weiss
- Release date: October 13, 2017
- Country: China
- Languages: Mandarin; English

Love is a Broadway Hit (Chinese: 情遇曼哈顿) is a Chinese romantic comedy film written and directed by Peter Lee.

== Plot ==
A new musical and dance show named Mulan is going to release on Broadway. A rivalry soon forms for the leading role between a newly graduate actress Qi Bai (played by Wang Likun), and a youthful actor Weidong Song (played by Godfrey Gao). The two first meet in a restaurant as part-time co-workers and then both realize they become competitors on stage. Qi believes that Mulan was a heroine so she has more possibility than Weidong to get the role. Yet the director decides both of them have equal chances. From rehearsal stage to part-time workplace, Qi and Weidong compete everywhere. As time goes by, their competition becomes intense yet love is quietly sprouting.

== Cast ==
- Godfrey Gao as Song Wei Dong
- Wang Likun as Bai Qi
- Kenan Heppe as Josh
- Wang Chuanjun as Tony
- Li Yuan (李媛), as Fang
- Naren Weiss as Pi
- Denis Ooi as Prince Claude
- Lauren Downie as Jamie
- Mark Andrew Garner as Mark (Broadway Dancer)

== Production ==
Casting for the film took place in late 2016. Production took place in New York City.
