= The Jade Pendant =

2017 American-Hong Kong film by Leong Po-Chih

- Film poster
- Directed by: Leong Po-Chih
- Written by: David Assael; Scott M. Rosenfelt
- Story by: L.P. Leung
- Produced by: Marc Liu
- Starring: Godfrey Gao; Clara Lee; Brian Yang; Tsai Chin; Russell Wong; Mark Boone Junior; Tzi Ma
- Cinematography: Jonathan West
- Edited by: Ellen Goldwasser
- Music by: Anne-Kathrin Dern
- Production company: Lotus Entertainment
- Distributed by: Crimson Forest Entertainment
- Release dates: October 19, 2017 (Boston Asian American Film Festival); November 3, 2017
- Running time: 106 minutes
- Countries: United States; Hong Kong
- Languages: English; Mandarin

The Jade Pendant is a 2017 historical Western film directed by Po-Chih Leong and written by David Assael and Scott M. Rosenfelt. It follows the tragic love story between two Chinese immigrants (played by Godfrey Gao and Clara Lee) against the backdrop of rising anti-Chinese sentiment in the American West, culminating in the events surrounding the Los Angeles Chinese massacre of 1871.

== Plot ==
In the 1870s, a young woman named Peony flees her home in Guangdong, China, to escape an arranged marriage. She and her friend, Lily, are tricked into signing exploitative labor contracts, believing they are headed for a better life in America. Upon arrival in California, they discover the grim reality: they have been sold into servitude as "flower girls", a euphemism for prostitution, for the powerful and ruthless Hong Kong Triad boss, Yu Hing.

Peony, determined and trained in martial arts, fiercely resists her fate. Her refusal to submit attracts the attention of Tom Wong, an American-born Chinese man who works as a cook. Tom is the son of Mr. Wong, a laborer who worked on the First Transcontinental Railroad. A romance blossoms between the resilient Peony and the more assimilated but kind-hearted Tom, characterized by a reversal of traditional gender roles. Defying the odds and the oppressive forces around them, they marry and have a child, building a fragile happiness.

Throughout her journey, Peony wears a circular green jade pendant, a gift from her grandmother meant to provide luck and protection. However, their peace is threatened by Yu Hing, who is determined to expand his criminal empire in America and remains fixated on reclaiming Peony. His relentless pursuit forces Peony and Tom into a desperate struggle to protect their family.

The couple's personal turmoil unfolds within the increasingly volatile and racially charged atmosphere of Los Angeles' Chinatown. The film depicts the tensions between the Irish American police force, rival Chinese tongs, and the growing resentment from the white populace. These tensions finally explode in a wave of mob violence. While the film focuses on the fictional story of Peony and Tom, their lives are tragically intertwined with the historical 1871 Chinese Massacre, where a mob of over 500 people stormed Chinatown, resulting in the lynching of 19 Chinese immigrants, one of the largest mass lynchings in American history.

The film was released on the anniversary of this massacre and was shot on location in Utah.

== Cast ==
- Godfrey Gao as Tom Wong (湯姆・黃)
- Clara Lee as Peony / Ying Ying Leung Wong (牡丹 / 黃粱瑩瑩)
- Brian Yang as Sam (三姆)
- Tsai Chin as Madame Pong (龐太太)
- Russell Wong as Wong Lim (黃廉)
- Chen Tang as Joe Lee (李喬)
- Jamie Harris as Robert Thompson
- Nina Wu as Lily (莉莉)
- Sue Wong as Po Ping (王太太)
- Edward Zo as Mei Song (宋眉)
- Christine Ko as May (梅)
- Song Hanz as Rough Looking Man
- Raymond Ma as Dr. Tong (董大夫)
- Mark Boone Junior as Captain Wynne
- Tzi Ma as Yu Hing (余興)
- Perry Yung as Bai Qiang

== Reception ==
Produced independently after larger studios passed on a Western with a predominantly Asian cast, The Jade Pendant found its audience at the festival level. It was honored with the "Golden Angel" Award for "Best Film by an Independent Producer" at the 2017 Chinese American Film Festival.

The film was received by critics as an ambitious effort to bring a marginalized history to the screen. Reviewers frequently praised its premise and historical setting, particularly the depiction of the 1871 Los Angeles massacre. However, the critical consensus suggested that the film's execution leaned heavily into melodramatic conventions, with some arguing that this approach simplified the complex social tensions of the era. Despite this, the film was noted for its strong production values and for providing a platform for Asian American narratives in the Western genre.
