= Bugs (2014 film) =

- Directed by: Yan Jia
- Starring: Xia Zitong; Zhang Zilin; Eric Wang; Sphinx Ting
- Production companies: Shenzhen Jinhaian Industry Co., Ltd; Meiya Great Wall Media（Beijing） Co., Ltd; Beijing Dongfang Huamian Film Co., Ltd; Pearl River Pictures Co., Ltd
- Release date: October 10, 2014
- Running time: 82 minutes
- Country: China
- Language: Mandarin
- Box office: ¥7.74 million (China)

Bugs (Chinese: 食人虫) is a 2014 Chinese 3D science fiction disaster thriller film directed by Yan Jia. It was released on October 10.

== Plot ==
In the near future, due to huge demand for protein, synthetic protein is rapidly developed around the world. James, a fanatic geneticist, has managed to raise superbugs that can provide high-quality protein at low-cost. However, the reproduction of the bugs goes out of control. They break out of the tubes, devour scientists, and turn into giant monsters. Numerous monster bugs hankering after men's flesh and blood swarm into the sea. Meanwhile, there's a rave party going on by the beach, and the participants have no idea the bugs are coming. The bugs keep reproducing and eventually cause a tsunami. The young people enjoying the party suddenly get ripped up and eaten. The bugs turn the beautiful beaches into a horrible sea of blood. Some guys are bold enough to jump onto the ship where the bug queen is at, hope to end the war by killing it. They know – if they don't succeed, mankind will be doomed...

== Cast ==
- Xia Zitong
- Zhang Zilin
- Eric Wang
- Sphinx Ting Yoshi Sudraso and Casey Burgess

== Reception ==
By October 11, the film had earned ¥7.74 million at the Chinese box office.
