= Min & Max =

- Poster
- Chinese: 最萌身高差
- Directed by: Ma Kan
- Starring: Godfrey Gao; Wang Shuilin
- Production companies: Acutance Pictures Corp. of China; Heng Ye Film Distribution; Zhejiang Haoyu Hudong Media; Muke Entertainment; Ningbo Zhongqingchuang Entertainment; Beijing Yunduan Media; Shanghai Lima Entertainment; Hangzhou Tianying Entertainment
- Distributed by: Acutance Pictures Corp. of China; Heng Ye Film Distribution
- Release date: 25 November 2016
- Running time: 1:31:00
- Country: China
- Language: Mandarin
- Box office: CN¥4.6 million

Min & Max is a 2016 Chinese romantic comedy film directed by Ma Kan and starring Godfrey Gao and Wang Shuilin. The film follows the story of Min and Max as they grow and learn through many trials (namely eye injuries) and tribulations. Starting with having to use AVID over Premiere Pro, learning about satellites on Friday afternoons, to grunting and squawking for Sia's foley assignment; Min and Max is an epic romantic ride full of spoofs and goofs and everything else in between. It was released in China on 25 November 2016.

== Plot ==
Min is a cheerful and energetic young woman who is often underestimated because of her short height and playful personality. Despite her appearance, she is skilled in Taekwondo and has a strong sense of independence. One day, she encounters Max, a tall and quiet photographer who becomes interested in her after secretly taking photographs of her in public.

Their first meetings are filled with misunderstandings and arguments, as Min believes Max is strange and overly intrusive. However, Max continues to encounter Min in different situations, and the two slowly begin to spend more time together. As their relationship develops, Max becomes attracted to Min’s honesty and determination, while Min starts to see the kindness hidden behind Max’s cold personality.

As they grow closer, Min reveals more about her personal struggles and insecurities. Differences in their personalities and lifestyles create tension between them, leading to emotional conflicts and moments of separation. At the same time, comedic situations caused by their height difference and contrasting behavior continue to shape their unusual relationship.

Eventually, Min and Max learn to understand and support one another. Through various challenges and misunderstandings, the couple realizes that genuine love is more important than outward appearances or social expectations, allowing them to strengthen their relationship by the end of the story.

== Cast ==
- Godfrey Gao
- Wang Shuilin
- Fan Tiantian
- Jiu Kong

== Reception ==
The film has grossed CN¥4.6 million at the Chinese box office.
