= Maya from Madurai =

Indian play written by Naren Weiss

Maya from Madurai is an Indian play written by Naren Weiss. The play explores the life and death of a drug dealer, and marked the directorial debut of actress Pooja Devariya. It premiered at the 2013 edition of the Short and Sweet Festival in Chennai, India; where it won the Play of the Day award. Three days before script submission, director Devariya called former classmate Weiss and asked him to write something, describing what she had in mind.

The play subsequently toured the country as a part of The Park's New Festival in 2013. South Indian theatre troupe Stray Factory took the one act play to six Indian cities, with four other short plays. The original production starred Venkatesh Harinathan, who also translated the play.
