= Fuying & Sam =

FS (Fuying & Sam)
- Born: Malaysia
- Years active: 2012–present
- Musical career
- Also known as: FS
- Origin: Malaysia
- Genres: Mandopop

FUYING & SAM, or FS, is a pop duo from Malaysia consist of members Chronicles Ong Fu Ying 王赴穎 and Sam Chin Neng 沈展寧 (Sam). The duo released their mini album Love Protection 1.0 in 2012.

== History ==
=== 2012: Formation ===
The duo was formed in 2012. Initially, the two attended a vocal training course and were later selected to sing the theme song for local movie Kepong Gangster. The pairing worked and their then record label decided to market them as a duo instead of solo singers.

=== 2015: Moved to Taiwan and Second Album, Close To ===
Following the success of their earlier EPs and debut 2014 full-length album, Love Temperature, the duo decided to be based in Taiwan. In 2015, the duo released their second album Close To to a lukewarm reception compared to their previous album.

=== 2017 - 2019: The Lakeside Of Yearning and return to Malaysia ===
Their third album, The Lakeside Of Yearning was released in 2017. In 2019, the duo decided to return to Malaysia because 90 percent of their music is made in Malaysia. Despite the return, Fuying & Sam still has links to a Taiwanese company which helps distribute its music.

== Members ==
- Chronicles Ong Fu Ying 王赴穎 (Fuying) was born on 16 May 1993 (age 32) and is a Selangor native.
- Sam Chin Neng 沈展寧 (Sam) was born in Ipoh on 5 April 1990 (age 35). He is a vegetarian/pescetarian.

== Philanthropy ==
In July 2016, Fuying & Sam helped to raise in excess of RM 3,000 for the Pertubuhan Kebajikan Seri Cahaya, through the Love + Help charity concert in Penang. The duo also performed at the World Vision Malaysia 30-Hour Famine 2016, an event aimed to raise funds for communities living in poverty and hunger in August 2016.

== Discography ==
=== Singles / Mini Albums ===
Title	Details	Tracks
Love Protection 1.0	Release Date: 29 December 2012; Language: Mandarin; Label：HALO MUSIC 海螺音乐	Track Listing: 1. 前奏 Intro; 2. 保護 Protect; 3. 分開以後 Detachment; 4. 說一句話 Say A Word; {{{2}}}
全世界 Love & Dream	Release Date: 8 December 2013; Language: Mandarin; Label：HALO MUSIC 海螺音乐	Track Listing: 1. 全世界都以為我們在一起; 2. 你要快樂; 3. Like 我一下; 4. 逆光; 5. I've been waiting for you; {{{2}}}
有你真好 Great To Have You	Release Date: 2016; Language: Mandarin; Label：RAM Entertainment Sdn. Bhd.	Track Listing: 1. 有你真好; {{{2}}}
日寸小偷 The Time Keeper	Release Date: 20 November 2018; Language: Mandarin; Label：RAM Entertainment Sdn. Bhd.	Track Listing: 1. 日寸小偷; {{{2}}}

=== Albums ===
Title	Album Details	Tracks
温度 (Love Temperature)	Release Date: 19 September 2014; Language: Mandarin; Label：RAM Entertainment Sdn. Bhd.	Track Listing: 1. 吻的溫度; 2. 可不可以你也剛好喜歡我; 3. 兩個太陽(Feat. 魏如昀); 4. 全世界都以為我們在一起; 5. 想為你做的事; 6. Like我一下; 7. 保持聯繫; 8. 說一句話; 9. 愛他還是我; 10. 分開以後; 11. 分開以後 Bonus Track(2014回憶重播版); {{{2}}}
靠近 (Close To ___)	Release Date: 20 October 2015; Language: Mandarin; Label：RAM Entertainment Sdn. Bhd.	Track Listing: 1. OVER; 2. 凭什么 (How could you); 3. 靠近 (Close to); 4. 爱一个人不一定要在一起 (You Don't Have To Be Together To Love); 5. 有你做伙 (Cheers); 6. Sit Back & Relax; 7. 海 (The Ocean); 8. 让爱延续 (Love Lasts); 9. 清凉的风 (Breeze); 10. I am so sorry; {{{2}}}
我们走在相思湖畔 (The Lakeside of Yearning)"	Release Date: 25 September 2017; Language: Mandarin; Label： Great Time Music Co., Ltd.	Track Listing: 1. You are by my side 2. 相思湖畔; 3. 月光下; 4. 相思湖畔-溫情版; 5. 有你真好; 6. 第一縷晨光; 7. 生命協奏曲; {{{2}}}

== Filmography ==
Year	Title	Role	Notes
2015	The Dream Boyz 小電影	Liu Mei Zheng (Fuying); Lee Da Xiong(Sam)	Released on 12 February 2015.
2015	Paint My Love 再见,我爱你	Hao Wen (Fuying); Shen (Sam)	Released on 3 December 2015.

== Concerts / Showcase ==
Year	Title	Venue	Notes
2015	FS 2°C Concert Live In Malaysia	Mega Star Arena, Kuala Lumpur	
2015	FS Mini Concert	Taipei, Taiwan	
2015	FS Sit Back & Relax Live Showcase	Gardens Theatre	
2016	FS 有你真好 Music Live	Kuala Lumpur	
2020	FS ∞ Infinity Global Exclusive Online Music Live	Online	Free concert commemorating 8 years of their formation.

== Awards ==
Year	Award	Category	Recipient	Outcome
2013	AIM Chinese Music Award	Best New Artiste	Fuying & Sam	Won
2013	Neway Music Awards	My Favorite New Singer	Fuying & Sam	Won
2013	Neway Music Awards	Top 10 Hottest Local Tracks	分開以後 Detachment	Won
2013	Neway Music Awards	Track of the Year	分開以後 Detachment	Won
2013	Neway Music Awards	My Favorite Group	Fuying & Sam	Won
2013	MY Astro Music Awards	MY Astro Best Newcomer	Fuying & Sam	Won
2013	MY Astro Music Awards	My Astro Best Single Top 25	分開以後 Detachment	Won
2013	Red Box & Green Box Top 20 Songs Awards	Most Requested Song	分開以後 Detachment	Won
2014	4th Global Chinese Golden Chart Awards	Best Newcomer of The Year	Fuying & Sam	Won
2014	Metro Radio Hong Kong Award	Best New Artiste	Fuying & Sam	Won
2014	Music Authors' Copyright Protection (MACP) Awards	Most Performed Chinese Song	分開以後 Detachment - 曲: 馬逸騰 Ma Yi Teng	Won
2015	Malaysia PWH Music Awards	Most Popular Original Track Singer by Live Votes	Fuying & Sam	Won
2015	Malaysia PWH Music Awards	Best Group Award	Fuying & Sam	Won
2015	Malaysia PWH Music Awards	Recommended Newcomer Award (Bronze)	Fuying & Sam	Won
2015	Malaysia PWH Music Awards	Top 10 Original Track (Local)	分開以後-詞 (Detachment) - 曲: 馬逸騰 Ma Yi Teng	Won
2015	5th Global Chinese Golden Chart Award	Best Group	Fuying & Sam	Won
2015	Neway Music Award	JOOX Popularity Award (by streaming via JOOX)	Fuying & Sam	Won
2015	Neway Music Award	Best Group	Fuying & Sam	Won
2015	Neway Music Award	Top 10 Favourite MV	可不可以你也刚好喜欢我	Won
2015	Neway Music Award	Top 10 Exclusive K-Song	可不可以你也刚好喜欢我	Won
2015	Neway Music Award	Best Song of the Year	可不可以你也刚好喜欢我	Won
2016	Neway Music Award	JOOX Popularity Award (by streaming via JOOX)	Fuying & Sam	Won
2016	Neway Music Award	Best Group	Fuying & Sam	Won
2016	Neway Music Award	Top 10 Favourite MV	愛一個人不一定要在一起	Won
2016	Neway Music Award	Top 5 Exclusive K-Song	海	Won
2016	Redbox K-20	Top 20 K-Song	凭什么	Won
2017	Neway Music Award	Favourite Group	Fuying & Sam	Won
2017	Neway Music Award	Top 10 Favourite MV	我們分開應該會更好一點	Won
2018	8th Global Chinese Golden Chart Award	Top 20 Songs of the Year	Fuying & Sam	Won
2018	8th Global Chinese Golden Chart Award	MYFM Top Award	Fuying & Sam	Won
2018	30th Malaysia PWH Music Awards 馬來西亞娛協 30颁奖典礼	Best Group	Fuying & Sam	Won
2018	Neway Music Award	Favourite Group	Fuying & Sam	Won
2018	Neway Music Award	Top 5 Favourite MV	1234567	Won
2018	Neway Music Award	Top 5 Exclusive K-Song	1234567	Won
