= Kazuko Fujita =

Japanese manga artist

Kazuko Fujita 藤田 和子
- Born: March 18, 1957 (age 69) Niigata, Japan
- Area: Manga artist
- Notable works: Makoto Call! Four Steps to Romance
- Awards: 1992 Shogakukan Manga Award for shōjo - Makoto Call!

Kazuko Fujita (藤田 和子, Fujita Kazuko) (born 18 March 1957 in Niigata, Japan) is a Japanese shōjo manga artist. She made her professional debut in 1977 in Bessatsu Shōjo Comic and she has written manga mainly for Flower Comics. She is best known for Makoto Call! about a girl who plays volleyball, for which she received the 1992 Shogakukan Manga Award for shōjo. In 2007, her Four Steps to Romance (ろまんす五段活用, Romance Godan Katsuyou) was dramatized on CTV in Taiwan as Romantic Princess.

Other series by her include Silver and Gold. Silver is a manga adaptation of a book by Penny Jordan, bearing the same title. Gold is based on Ann Major's novel, Secret Child.

== Works ==
=== Manga Artist and Writer ===
- Love Letter ni Kiss
- Yasashisa Endless (1980)
- Shouhin ni Te wo Dasu na (1985)
- Nakaniwa no Ibu-tachi (1985)
- Komugi Panic! (1985)
- Nakanaide Mister (1986)
- Juliet no Musume (1986–1987)
- Momoka Typhoon (1987–1989)
- Ramansu Godankatsuyou (1989–1990)
- Makoto Call! (1991–2003)
- Happy Ends (1992–1997)
- Tenshi no Shippo (1993)
- Mariko Mangaka ni Narimasu (1993)
- Dream Rush (1994)
- P. P. Scramble (1995–1996)
- Kin no Prism (1996–1997)
- Kaze ni Kike (1997)
- Akai Tsuki (1999)
- Ayakaze no Runner (1999–2000)
- Moonlight Party (2005)
- Hana Kaoru Kimi e (2007)
- Tsuki no Pierce (2009)
- Wagamamana Hitomi (2010)
