= Wong Jinglun =

- 黃靖倫
- Born: 23 July 1983 (age 43)
- Occupations: Singer, actor, tv presenter
- Years active: 2008–present

Chinese name
- Traditional Chinese: 黃靖倫
- Simplified Chinese: 黄靖伦
Transcriptions
Standard Mandarin
- Hanyu Pinyin: Huáng Jìnglún
- Musical career
- Also known as: Hayden Wong, Jing Wong, JL
- Genres: Mandopop
- Instrument: Vocal
- Label: Warner Music Taiwan (2008–present)

Wong Jinglun (traditional Chinese: 黃靖倫; simplified Chinese: 黄靖伦; pinyin: Huáng Jìnglún, born 23 July 1983) is a Taiwan-based Singaporean singer and actor. He is managed by Universes Entertainment Marketing Limited.

== Biography ==
Wong is of Hakka descent, with ancestry from Dabu, Guangdong. He was a contestant on season 3 of One Million Star. He auditioned in Singapore and was one of the five contestants to get the golden ticket to compete in Taiwan. He once PKed with Peter Pan when "Four Princes of Superstar Avenue" (星光四少) went to Singapore. He caught the attention of many people because of his high pitched vocals and falsettos, which sounds like a hybrid of mainly Gilla, a bit of Cher, and Patti Page. He is also well known for his humorous character and speech. He never fails to say Chinese idioms in every week's competition. Wong gotten a sixth position in the competition and was voted as the most popular contestant. He performed five songs in a One Million Star concert show in LA. His performance was highly commended by many.

Wong's debut album, Jing's Note, was released in Taiwan on 14 November 2008. His album sold over 45,000 copies in Taiwan and around 4,000 copies in Singapore.

Wong is attending vocal and acting classes in Taiwan. He was the guest artists for most of Jolin Tsai's Butterfly School Concert Tour. He has also clinched his first endorsement deal with Suntory C.C. Lemon alongside his fellow senior Rainie Yang.

In 2009, Wong co-starred with Cyndi Wang and Jiro Wang in his first Taiwanese drama, Momo Love on Gala Television (GTV). Prior to that, he had a small role on SET's My Queen as Ethan Juan's classmate.

From 2011, Wong shifted his focus on TV presenting (referred as a variety-show-class entertainer). He, along with Sister Strawberry, took over from Linda Jian (Sister Butterfly) and Hank Chen in November 2012 on a travel show.

In 2013, Wong starred in an original musical by Toy Factory Productions, entitled Innamorati, which features 12 songs sung by Eric Moo, along with 6 other singers including Tay Kewei, Bonnie Loo and Sugie Phua.

== Personal life ==
Wong was married in May 2020 and his son born on 24 September 2020.

== Discography ==
=== Albums ===
Studio albums
Album #	Title	Released	Label
1st	Jing's Note	14 November 2008	Warner Music Taiwan
2nd	OK Man	11 December 2009	Warner Music Taiwan

=== Soundtrack contribution ===
- "我的媽" [My Mother] – insert song for Momo Love
- "鹹魚" [Salted Fish] – insert song for Momo Love

== Filmography ==
=== Television series ===
Year	Title	Role	Ref
2009	My Queen	Xiao Shen 小沈	
2009	Momo Love	Chen Yuyi 陳餘一	
2011	Let's Play Love PK爱情	Ian	
2012	Jump!	Zhang Guolun 章国伦	
2019	Jalan Jalan 带你去走走	邱宇凡	
2019	天之蕉子	高志龙	
2019-2021	Girl's Power series 女力報到	Huang Wei-lun 黃韋綸	

== Stage productions ==
Year	Chinese Title	English Title	Role
2014	唯一	Innamorati	Si Jing 司净
2016	唯二	Innamorati Two	小志

== Endorsements ==
- 2009: Suntory C.C.Lemon
