= Naren Weiss =

American actor

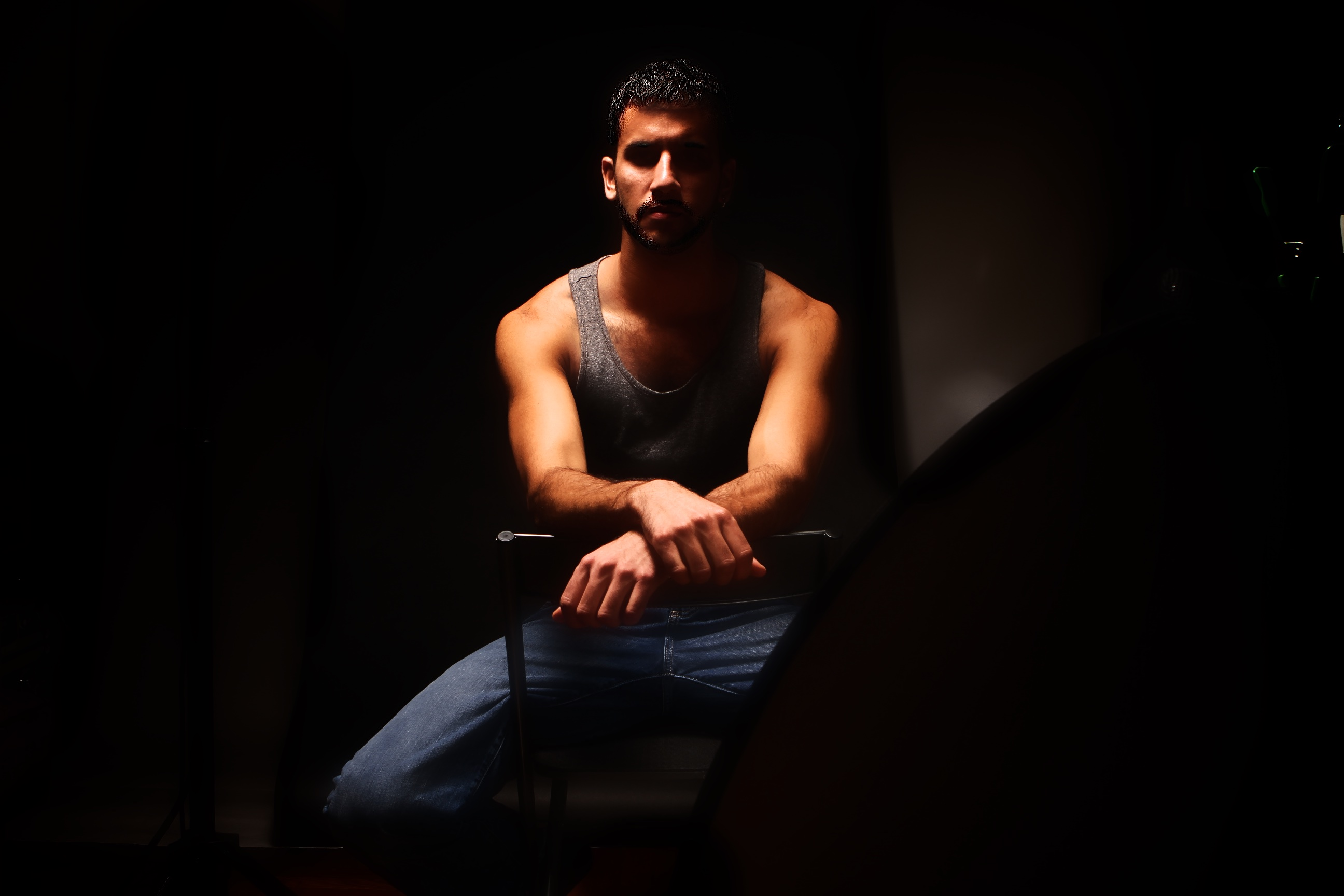
- Weiss during a photoshoot in New York City in 2016
- Born: March 15, 1991 (age 35); Houston, Texas, U.S.
- Occupations: Actor, playwright, model
- Years active: 2010–present
- Known for: Vishwaroopam; Maya from Madurai
- Height: 6 ft 3 in (191 cm)

Naren Weiss (born March 15, 1991) is an actor, playwright, and former model. He played Osama bin Laden in Kamal Haasan's film on terrorism Vishwaroopam, Dekker in the ABC series Deception, and is known for his work in theatre in India and the United States.

== Early life ==
Born in Nassau Bay, 30 minutes outside of Houston, Weiss's family bounced around various places in the U.S. until, at the age of 12, the family migrated to Madras. While finishing his education, he found his love for the stage in several school and college productions, and went on to attend Madras Christian College and Brooklyn College. He is of mixed ethnicity and worked as a model during college, appearing in campaigns for Sprite, Bank of India, The Chennai Silks and on magazine covers like India Today. He was discovered by VJ Paloma Rao while performing onstage, leading to his becoming a VJ for Channel UFX. He comes from an athletic background, and turned down several scholarships to play basketball at the collegiate level to instead focus on acting.

== Career ==
Naren Weiss began his career onstage in Chennai, acting and writing in plays for The Little Theatre, the Stray Factory, and The Hindu Metroplus Theater Fest. He found success as a young stage actor and received visibility from the Indian media, being called "enchantingly scraggly and gloriously flamboyant" (The Hindu) and "annoying perfection" (The New Indian Express).

He had a small role in Good Night Good Morning, notably played Osama bin Laden in Vishwaroopam, and had an unsuccessful audition run for the title role in Life of Pi. He played a separate character named Pi years later in the Chinese film Love is a Broadway Hit directed by Peter Lee, a long-time friend and associate of Life of Pi director Ang Lee.

He acted in the United States in 2014 in New York City. His performance as an Israeli immigrant in Meron Langsner's Over Here was successful, and he had other roles at the Geffen Playhouse, Kennedy Center, Off-Broadway, and guest roles on American television shows such as Elementary, The Brave, Broad City and others. For his work on The Brave, NBC submitted him for consideration in the Outstanding Guest Actor category for the 2018 Primetime Emmy Awards, although he did not receive a nomination.

He is one among a small number of playwrights from the Indian subcontinent writing in English, and has had his work performed around the world; including at the prestigious Hindu Metroplus Theater Festival, National Arts Festival, Hollywood Fringe Festival, Alliance Francaise of Singapore, various global Short+Sweet Festivals, and across India.

His book Deepak and Raj: Two Indian Plays reached #1 on Amazon's playwriting list in 2020.

== Personal life ==
Naren Weiss speaks multiple languages, and was a translator for Madam Secretary. He also taught playwriting at The City College of New York.

== Books ==
- God is Dead: Ten Short Plays and Stories (2019) - contains the piece Maya from Madurai
- Deepak and Raj: Two Indian Plays (2020)
- A Halfway Celebrity Actor Without a Home: Some Poems (2021) - illustrations by Ujwal Nair
- A Marginally Better Place: Performance Manuscripts (2021)
- Something More than Broken Love (2021) - poetry, with illustrations by Ujwal Nair
