= Showlen Maya =

Taiwanese singer

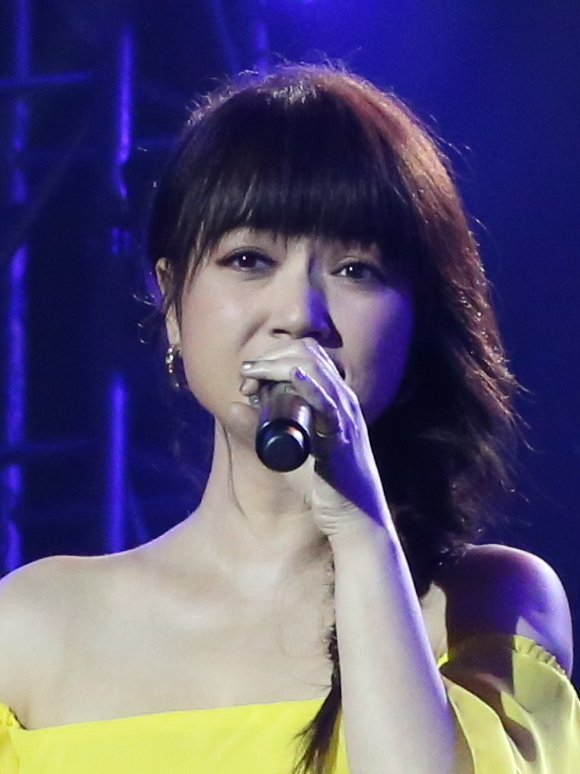
Showlen Maya

Shen Show-len (born October 18, 1978), better known by her stage name Showlen Maya (or Xiulan Maya), is a Taiwanese singer of Han Chinese (father) and Bunun (mother) descent. While she also sings in Mandarin, Showlen Maya is primarily a Hokkien pop singer, even though she doesn't speak Hokkien.

Showlen Maya has released 20 albums to date. She has been nominated for "Best Hokkien Female Singer" (or "Best non-Mandarin Dialect Female Singer" before 2004) at the Golden Melody Awards a record 15 times, including in 11 consecutive years from 2004 to 2017.
