= Wang Likun =

Chinese actress and dancer

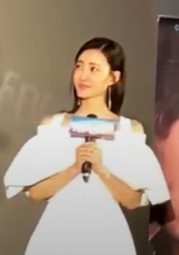
- Wang in 2017
- Born: March 22, 1985 (age 41); Chifeng, Inner Mongolia, China
- Other name: Claudia Wang
- Education: Beijing Dance Academy
- Occupations: Actress; dancer
- Years active: 2004–present
- Agent: Ciwen Media
- Spouse: Zhan Haoli (m. 2019; div. 2023)

Chinese name
- Simplified Chinese: 王丽坤
- Traditional Chinese: 王麗坤
Transcriptions
Standard Mandarin
- Hanyu Pinyin: Wáng Lìkūn

This is a Chinese name. The family name is Wang.

Wang Likun (Chinese: 王丽坤, born 22 March 1985), also known as Claudia Wang, is a Chinese actress and dancer. She is best known for her roles in television series Seven Swordsmen (2006), Beauty's Rival in Palace (2010), Beijing Youth (2012), Miss Assassin (2013), Qing Mang (2013), Twice Blooms the Flowers (2015); as well as the movies Ex-Files (2014) and Somewhere Only We Know (2015).

== Early life ==
Wang Likun was born on 22 March 1985, in Chifeng, Inner Mongolia. Wang is a Manchu, a Chinese ethnic minority. Wang Likun graduated from Beijing Dance Academy in 2004, majoring in traditional dance.

== Career ==
Wang Likun was discovered by famous Chinese director Tsui Hark, and shot her first television series Seven Swordsmen in 2004. She gained more recognition with her portrayal of three different roles in historical drama Beauty's Rival in Palace (2010). Wang also won the Acting Breakthrough award at the China TV Drama Awards for her performance as a mentally-ill patient in the popular youth series Beijing Youth (2012), and the Most Promising Actress award for her role as a wealthy girl in Barber (2013).

In 2015, Wang starred in the romantic film Somewhere Only We Know directed by Xu Jinglei. She won the Rising Star of Asia at 9th Asian Film Awards Special Awards Ceremony, Most Popular Actress at 22nd Beijing College Student Film Festival and Best Actress at 3rd China International Film Festival London for her performance.

In 2016, she was cast as the one of female leads in fantasy action drama Martial Universe, which stars Yang Yang as the main character.

In 2017, she featured in fantasy blockbuster Journey to the West: Conquering the Demons 2 produced by Stephen Chow and directed by Tsui Hark. The same year, she starred in the romantic comedy film Love is a Broadway Hit.

In 2019, Wang played Su Daji in the fantasy television series The Gods.

== Personal life ==
Wang married Zhan Haoli in 2019; the couple divorced around 2023. Zhan had previously been sentenced to six years in prison in 2005 for fraud. Between 2019 and 2022, during the marriage, he again defrauded nearly 200 homebuyers of approximately RMB 1.39 billion by selling properties without lawful land development rights. In February 2023, Zhan was arrested on suspicion of fraud. Wang’s studio issued a statement denying her involvement in any illegal activity, though some brands removed her promotional materials. On 26 December 2025, the Beijing No. 2 Intermediate People’s Court sentenced Zhan to life imprisonment at first instance.

== Filmography ==
=== Film ===
Year	Chinese title	English title	Role	Notes/Ref.
2008	八十一格		Hu Yanting	
2014	前任攻略	Ex-Files	Luo Qian	
2015	有一个地方只有我们知道	Somewhere Only We Know	Jing Tian	
2015	重生爱人	The Beloved	Su Yin	
2017	西遊伏妖篇	Journey to the West: Conquering the Demons 2	Spider Demon	
2017	情遇曼哈顿	Love Is a Broadway Hit	Bai Qi	
2018	幕后玩家	A or B	Wei Simeng	
2019	决胜时刻	Mao Zedong 1949	Meng Yu	
2021	侍神令	The Yinyang Master	Peach Blossom Spirit	
2026	我没错！	Probation	Li Xiang	

=== Television series ===
Year	Chinese title	English title	Role	Notes/Ref.
2006	七剑下天山	Seven Swordsmen	Liu Yufang	
2007	金耳环		Lu Baozhen	
2007	爱就爱了		Zhang Tianyu	
2007	五号特工组		Gao Han	
2007	家	The Family	Qin	
2008	血色迷雾		Zheng Xiaocong	
2009	龙门驿站		Zhu'er	
2009	加油优雅	Jiayou You Ya	Kang Yayou	
2009	当铺	Pawnshop	Rui Yunxiang	
2010	无间有爱	Infernal Lover	Ding Xiaoxue	
2010	美人心计	Beauty's Rival in Palace	Nie Shen'er / Nie Ao / Wang Zhi / Concubine Qi	
2010	贤妻良母	Good Wife and Mother	Luo Na	Cameo
2010	迷案1937	Mystery 1937	Li Menglu	
2010	告密者	The Informant	Pigeon	
2011	盛女的黄金时代	The Golden Age of the Leftover Ladies	Liang Shuang	
2011	理发师	Barber	Song Jiayi	
2011	唐宫美人天下	Beauty World	Bai He	Cameo
2012	青盲		Wang Lingyu	
2012	五号特工组2		Gao Han	
2012	北京青年	Beijing Youth	Ren Zhiliao	
2012	连环套	Lian Huan Tao	Ma Xiaohui	
2012	婚巢	Destination of Love	Yang Xue	
2013	枪花	Miss Assassin	Fan Lu	
2013	零下三十八度		Chang Qing	
2013	恋爱的那点事儿	Fall in Love		Cameo
2014	爱的多米诺	Domino Effect of Love	Xie Xiaonuo	
2014	战神	God of War	Lin Yan	
2015	想明白了再结婚	Think Before You Marry	Yu Xiaoyu	
2015	两生花	Twice Blooms the Flowers	Yan Song	
2015	爱情珠宝	Love Jewelry	Xu Shuijing	Cameo
2015	狭路		Miao Qing	Cameo
2017	漂洋过海来看你	Across the Ocean to See You	Su Mang	
2017	凤凰无双	Phoenix Warriors	Miao Qianqian / Nie Wushuang	
2018	武动乾坤	Martial Universe	Ling Qingzhu	
2019	封神	The Gods	Su Daji	
2021	海洋之城	One Boat One World	Tian Ai	
2021	三生有幸遇见你	Lucky With You	Wu Shiyi	
2026	玉簟秋	The Lament of Autumn	Chen Wanqiao	

=== Variety show ===
Year	English title	Chinese title	Role	Notes/Ref.
2020	Female Drifters	乘风破浪的姐姐	Cast member	

== Discography ==
Year	English title	Chinese title	Album
2012	"Forgive Me"	原谅我	—N/a
2012	"Irony"	讽刺	—N/a
2015	"Finally"	终于	Think Before You Marry OST

== Awards and nominations ==
Year	Award	Category	Nominated work	Result	Ref.
2012	4th China TV Drama Awards	Breakthrough Award	Beijing Youth	Won	
2015	9th Asian Film Awards	Rising Star of Asia	Somewhere Only We Know	Won	
2015	22nd Beijing College Student Film Festival	Most Popular Actress	Somewhere Only We Know	Won	
2015	3rd China International Film Festival London	Most Accomplished Actress	Somewhere Only We Know	Won	
2018	31st Tokyo International Film Festival - Gold Crane Award	Most Popular Actress	A or B	Won	
