= Cui Songwang =

Chinese journalist

Cui Songwang (Chinese: 崔松旺 born 1986) is a journalist from Luohe, Henan Province, China. He currently works for the Metropolitan Channel of Henan Television and serves as the head of its new media department. Cui is known for going undercover to expose "black kilns" (illegal brick kilns) and collect evidence to help rescue enslaved intellectually disabled laborers.

== Career ==
=== Early life ===
Cui Songwang was raised in the countryside by his grandfather. In 2003, he was admitted to Tianjin University of Sport, where he majored in journalism and law. He graduated in 2007 with dual degrees in both fields and joined the Metropolitan Channel of Henan Television as a reporter. That same year, the 2007 Chinese slave scandal came to light, prompting Cui to suspect that similar illegal brick kilns might exist in areas around Luohe, Zhumadian, Shangqiu, and Kaifeng. These illegal operations were known for trafficking intellectually disabled individuals and subjecting them to forced labor under extremely poor working and living conditions.

=== Undercover investigation of illegal brick kilns ===
==== First investigation ====
Henan TV's Metropolitan Channel frequently received calls from rural residents reporting missing family members, suspecting they had been abducted and forced into labor at illegal kilns. Although the channel often assisted police with tips and deployed journalists for investigations, the lack of concrete evidence had previously prevented authorities from cracking down on the perpetrators.

In July 2011, two intellectually disabled young men escaped from two different brick kilns, both showing visible signs of abuse. Their families contacted the Metropolitan Channel for help. Cui Songwang decided to launch an investigation into the enslavement of disabled individuals. After thorough research, Cui identified seven kilns suspected of abuse.

Disguised as a fugitive, Cui approached one of the kilns. The owner was highly suspicious, repeatedly questioning Cui about his origins and intentions. The owner offered him a bowl of spoiled noodles to test his desperation. Cui ate the noodles to gain trust but was ultimately turned away.

==== Undercover operation ====
Despite capturing initial video evidence, Cui sought more comprehensive proof. He planned to go undercover inside a kiln to live and work alongside enslaved workers. His superiors and colleagues warned him of the severe risks, including potential beatings or even death if discovered. Nevertheless, Cui was determined to expose the truth.

On August 14, 2011, Cui and three colleagues arrived at Zhumadian Railway Station in Henan Province. Cui played the role of bait, while the others monitored the area for safety. The next day, a man approached Cui with a job offer. Sensing the man was a trafficker, Cui pretended to be mentally impaired, dodging questions and scavenging leftover food from a nearby food stall before collapsing on the ground. He even smoked discarded cigarette butts. Despite his act, the trafficker did not take him away that day.

On the afternoon of August 17, the same man returned and took Cui to a brick kiln in Lvdian Township, Xiping County, where he sold Cui for 500 yuan as a slave laborer. Upon arrival, Cui was searched. To protect his recording equipment and phone, he feigned confusion and ignored instructions, successfully avoiding detection. The workers endured poor meals and were beaten for even minor mistakes.

On the night after his arrival, around 9 PM, Cui escaped while the overseer went to the restroom. He climbed over the kiln wall and navigated through the dark while coordinating with his colleagues via phone. He successfully reunited with them, bringing back critical first-hand evidence.

=== Officials implicated ===
Six local officials and policemen were implicated in the illegal brick kiln scandal. Their failure to conduct inspections, enforce regulations, or report violations contributed to the use of forced labor. Authorities detained 35 individuals and were pursuing 20 more in connection with the case.

==== Aftermath ====
On September 4, 2011, Henan Television aired the documentary Mentally Disabled Slave Workers, based on Cui's footage. The broadcast caused a national sensation. Cui later assisted police in rescuing over 30 enslaved individuals from the kiln. The kiln owner and traffickers were prosecuted and punished according to law. The public widely linked the scandal to systemic political corruption, lax law enforcement, and inadequate services for people with disabilities.

After the undercover operation, Cui's colleagues and family feared reprisals and urged him to step away from the front lines, but Cui declined.

== See also ==
- Slavery in China
- Disability in China
