= Abortion in Korea =

Abortion in Korea can refer to:

- Abortion in North Korea
- Abortion in South Korea
