= Human trafficking in China =

The People's Republic of China is a main source and also a significant transit and destination country for men, women, and children who are subjected to trafficking in persons, specifically forced labour and forced prostitution. Women and children from China are trafficked to Africa, Europe, Latin America, the Middle East, and North America, predominantly Taiwan, Thailand, Malaysia, and Japan for commercial sexual exploitation and forced labour. Women and children from Myanmar, Vietnam, Mongolia, former USSR (except for the Baltic States), North Korea, Romania, Indonesia, Nepal, Pakistan, and Ghana are trafficked to China for commercial sexual exploitation and forced labour.

U.S. State Department's Office to Monitor and Combat Trafficking in Persons placed the country in "Tier 3" , the lowest one, in 2017. As of 2025, China has remained in Tier 3, since the U.S. State Department determined that China did not fully meet the minimum standards for the elimination of trafficking and was not making significant efforts to do so. This 2025 report mentions especially widespread forced labor in government-affiliated sectors regarding ethnic and religious minorities such as Uyghurs, ethnic Kazakhs, ethnic Kyrgiz in the Xinjiang Region as well as ethnic Tibetans under the guise of "vocational training", "poverty alleviation" or "deradicalization' programs.

== Definition ==
According to the United Nations Palermo Protocol to Prevent, Suppress and Punish Trafficking in Persons of 2000, as part of the United Nations Convention against Transnational Organised Crime, human trafficking involves "recruitment, transportation, transfer, harbouring or receipt of persons" by "the use of force or other means of coercion" with the "purpose of exploitation".

The Protocol further explains "exploitation" as, at a minimum, "the sex work of others" and "other forms of sexual exploitation". A person is considered a "trafficked victim if he or she is involved in the above-mentioned situations, regardless of whether the person consents to it or not."

== Extent ==
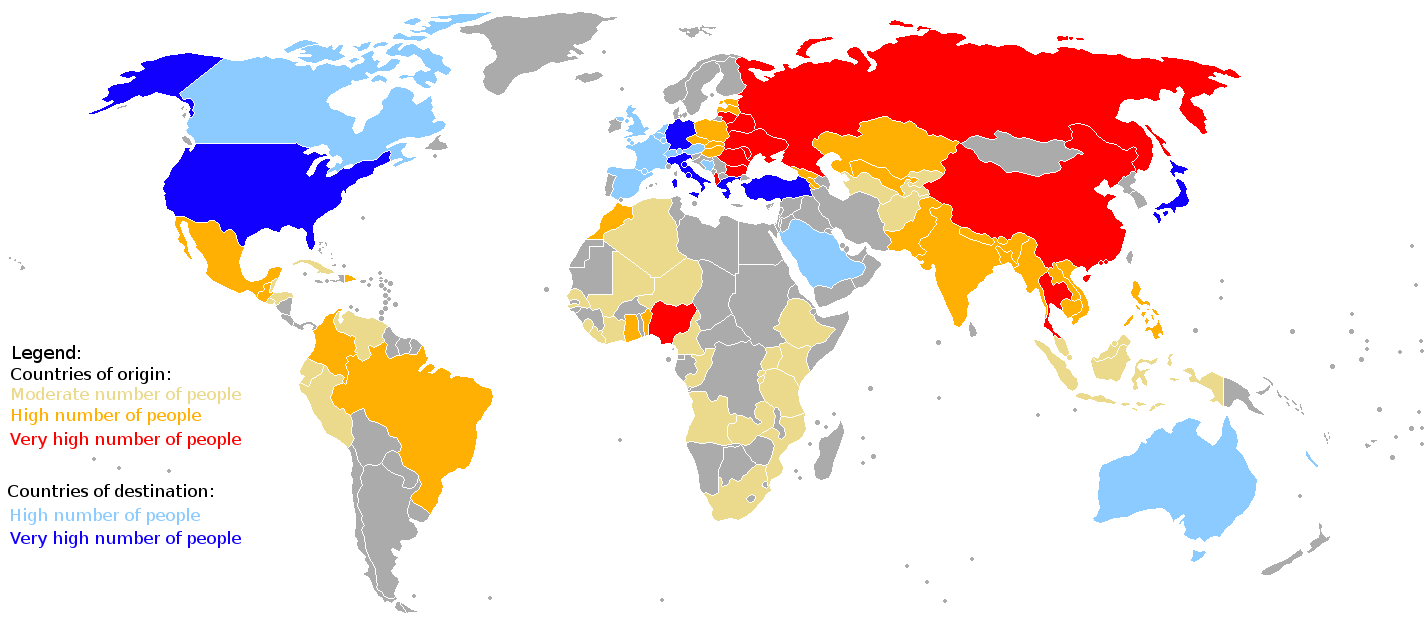
A global map of human trafficking.

The United Nations Inter-Agency Project on Human Trafficking reports that around 600,000 migrant workers leave China annually to work overseas. This number accounts for those tracked by the Ministry of Labour and Social Security and does not include those who leave without documents. Perhaps up to 90% of the migrant workers are migrating through unregulated and uninformed channels.

The number of female migrants is also rising rapidly, most of whom are young girls aged 17–25. It has been suggested that cross-border trafficking of women is increasing in China. Undocumented migrants who are trafficked into China mainly come from Vietnam, Russia, North Korea, and Myanmar. The UNIAP states that many individuals have been trafficked from southwest China through Myanmar and eventually into countries like Thailand and Malaysia.

The trafficking of individuals across countries has a wide array of purposes, ranging from commercial sexual exploitation and forced marriage to illegal adoption, forced labour, and begging. For example, of the 8,000 Vietnamese women married to Chinese men in Guangxi province between 1989 and 1999, some were introduced by friends and relatives, and most were found to have been trafficked.

=== Reports on human trafficking ===
According to a UNIAP study on the reports of human trafficking in China, there were 800 reported human trafficking cases reported in the print media between 2006 and 2007. The study found correlations between factors like age and gender with different types of human trafficking. For example, the trafficking of young boys for adoption, and girls and young women for sexual exploitation were different instances of human trafficking that had a positive correlation with another factor.

The main means of trafficking involved: fraud and deception, 37%; kidnapping, 26%; abuse of power or a position of vulnerability, 17%; and physical violence, 5%. 58% of the articles reported into which sector victims were trafficked: forced prostitution 19%; the entertainment industry, hairdressing or massage parlours 9%; brick kilns 9%; manufacturing 4%; domestic labour 3%; forced begging 3%; and others 11%.

=== Geographic distribution of forced labourers ===
According to the UNIAP report on human trafficking in China, 301 trafficking cases reported by the media from 2007 to mid-2008 were analysed to determine that Yunnan and Guizhou were the main source provinces of human trafficking. Fujian, Guangdong, and Shandong were the primary destination provinces. Henan province is both a source and destination for human trafficking.

A correlation has also been found between sources and the destinations for trafficked victims. Trafficked victims come from provinces with low GDP per capita like Yunnan and Guizhou. Provinces with high GDP per capita like Fujian, Guangdong, and Shandong, are the prime destinations for trafficked victims because there is a great demand and resources available to utilise forced labourers.

According to a 2023 report, there are up to 500,000 North Korean women and girls in China's northern provinces of Jilin, Liaoning, and Heilongjiang, where human trafficking industry exploded, reaching $105 million per year.

China remains a significant source of girls and women subjected to forced prostitution throughout the world. During the year, Chinese sex trafficking victims were reported on all of the inhabited continents. Traffickers recruited girls and young women, often from rural areas of China, using a combination of fraudulent job offers, imposition of large travel fees, and threats of physical or financial harm, to obtain and maintain their service in prostitution. Locations of sex trafficking of Chinese women and girls abroad vary widely, and sometimes are collocated with concentrations of Chinese migrant workers in factories, and mining and logging camps.

Most of the women trafficked from China to Thailand and Malaysia are from ethnic minorities like the Dai ethnicity from areas like the Xishuangbanna Dai Autonomous Prefecture in Yunnan province and they are trafficked by men of their own ethnicity. The Dai people are related to Thai people.

While Chinese prostitutes in British Malaya refused to service non-Chinese men, Japanese karayuki-san prostitutes in British Malaya were open to non-Japanese men.

Chinese prostitutes in French Indochina also only served overseas Chinese men there unlike the Japanese karayuki-san prostitutes who serviced non-Japanese men.

In 2011, a brothel in Moscow with Chinese and Vietnamese prostitutes which served only Chinese male citizens as clients was uncovered, it advertised to its Chinese clients via coded messages in a Chinese language newspaper but was uncovered by the police.

Chinese women sex trafficked to Chinese owned offshore gaming operators in the Philippines only serve Chinese male clients who visit or work at those Chinese owned offshore gaming operators according to the Philippines National Bureau of Investigation, with both the pimps and clients of the prostitutes being Chinese men residing in the Philippines, not local Filipino men or other foreigners in the Philippines.

=== Major Chinese hubs for human trafficking ===
The U.S. State Department's human trafficking report (2010) writes: "Internal trafficking is most pronounced among China's migrant population, which is estimated to exceed 150 million people. Forced labour remains a serious problem, including in brick kilns, coal mines, factories, and construction sites throughout China. There were numerous confirmed reports of involuntary servitude of children, adults, and migrant workers during the reporting period. As an example, in May 2009, media reports exposed a forced labour case at brick kilns in Anhui province, where mentally handicapped workers were subjected to slave-like conditions". The U.S. State Department's human trafficking report (2024) estimated that the PRC's internal migrant population exceeds 169 million people, placing them at high risk of forced labor in brick kilns, coal mines, and factories.

In addition to internal trafficking of the migrant population in China, rampant trafficking is often also attributed to a decade-long one-child policy that resulted in gender imbalance, and a universal expectation to marry. Men in communities experiencing a severe shortage of women are under strong pressure to find a bride. When they cannot afford to pay the high bride price for local women, they readily resort to purchasing brides kidnapped from other areas.

Popular areas of origin for domestically trafficked brides are the poorer areas of Yunnan, Sichuan, and Guizhou where poverty renders women more vulnerable to trafficking. Traffickers generally sell these women in distant areas, such as Shaanxi, Ningxia, Guangxi, Hainan, and Guangdong provinces with large gender imbalances.

== Types of human trafficking ==
=== Child labour ===
One demographic particularly susceptible to forced labour is children. The U.S. Department of State has issued a report stating that "Chinese children are forced into prostitution, and various forms of forced labour, including begging, stealing, selling flowers, and work in brick kilns and factories; the children of migrants are particularly vulnerable to trafficking." For example, there were reports that child labourers were found working in brick kilns, low-skill service sectors and in small workshops and factories. These reports found that the underage labourers are in their teens, typically ranging from 13 to 15 years old, but some are as young as 10 years old.

In another instance, children in Xinjiang were forced to pick cotton as part of a "work-study" program, according to foreign media reports. They worked long hours and were exploited under this simple guise. Students do not have a voice in raising concerns about how they are employed and have no protection against any abusive work practice or dangerous conditions of being on the job.

The overall extent of forced labour and child labour in China is also unclear in part because the government releases only limited information on the subject according to the report on trafficking issued by the U.S. Department of State. In 2014, the U.S. Department of Labor issued a List of Goods Produced by Child Labor or Forced Labor where China was attributed 12 goods ranging from bricks, coal and cotton to electronics, fireworks and Christmas decorations.

=== Sex trafficking ===
China's legal definition of trafficking does not automatically regard children over the age of 14 who are subjected to the commercial sex trade as trafficking victims. The U.S. Department of State's 2010 report said it was unclear whether Chinese laws recognized forms of coercion other than abduction, such as threats of physical harm or non-physical harm, as a means of trafficking. In the United States Department of State report: "Article 244 of the Chinese Criminal Law criminalizes forced labour, but prescribes punishments of a fine or no more than three years imprisonment, and only if the circumstances are found to be 'serious' - penalties which are not sufficiently stringent." In addition, the definition of trafficking does not pertain to male victims of trafficking or adult victims of labor trafficking.

The number of women suffering from sexual exploitation is exponentially increasing. Traffickers usually attract victims through false promises of high salaries and stable job incomes. Many women are deceived because of their poor education and they are often also marginalized minority groups who believe the false promises of traffickers who offer the hope of living an urban life.

The problem of sex trafficking stems from the gender imbalance present in China. Women are most likely sold into provinces like Henan in which the gender imbalance is particularly stark and where there is a high demand for women. Often, men kidnap the women after enticing them with promises of employment and money, but later sell them to villages and other provinces. Trafficked women are often then forced into marriage and therefore suffer from prolonged sexual exploitation. Particularly, according to the article "Human Trafficking and Smuggling in China" by Cindy Chu, trafficked women were usually aged between 20 and 50 in the past, but "recently most of them were under 20 and some were girls as young as 12 years old." The sex industry in China is flourishing, primarily fueled by the trafficking and sale of young women and girls for the purpose of marriage. This phenomenon has been influenced by the historical implications of the one-child policy and the traditional Chinese inclination for male offspring, which has led to a significant gender imbalance with a surplus of men in the country.

In 2018, Johns Hopkins Bloomberg School of Public Health and the Kachin Women's Association Thailand published a study that estimated that in just one province in China, there are approximately 21,000 women and girls from the northern part of Myanmar who were forced into marriage from 2013 to 2017. This was then associated with the “One Child” policy in China, which was claimed to have caused the gender imbalance in China that reached its height in 2004, where about 121 boys were born for every 100 girls (Beech, 2019). China's ‘One Child’ policy was a program that officially started on September 25, 1980, under the leadership of Deng Xiaoping, as a way to curb China's rapid population growth rate, which was reaching the one-billion mark by the late 1970s (Pletcher 2020). The program later ended on October 29, 2015, when the rules were slowly relaxed to allow for a second child for every family (Zhang, 2020). The policy not only resulted in a general reduction in China's fertility and birth rates but also a skewed sex ratio towards males, where there were about 3-4 percent more males than females. This is due to the tradition in which sons (especially firstborns) usually inherit the family name and property and are tasked with taking care of the parents, which made having daughters undesirable. This also resulted in an increase in female fetus abortions, the number of female children abandoned/placed in orphanages, and infanticide of baby girls. Since males are the bearers of family heritage, the shortage of wives could mean an end to the family trees, so marrying wives from nearby countries became a coping mechanism (Beech, 2019). However, this demand has created an opportunity for human smugglers/traffickers to commit human trafficking crimes to meet the increasing demands for brides.

Economic hardships, especially in rural areas, are cited to be the main reason why so many women became victims of human trafficking through transnational marriages. The possibility of immigration through marriage, in a way, offers women opportunities towards a better life as it is often seen as an easy and secure path to wealth, stability, and mobility. Culturally, the perception of wifehood and modernity are also factors that motivate the idea of marriage migration, usually via media and other forms of communication, which convince many that establishing a stable family life with middle-class resources is possible beyond their borders (Yang and Lu, 2010). Another important factor is the political instability and violence in neighboring countries that leave women vulnerable to displacement and human trafficking. For example, brides trafficked from northern Myanmar into China are mostly part of an ethnic minority that is vulnerable to the long-run conflict in the region. They are often tricked by traffickers who promise well-paid employment opportunities in China (Barr, 2020). Although there are more initiatives to combat the issue both domestically and internationally, more cooperation in the region is needed either through bilateral or multilateral arrangements.

=== Extraction of organs ===
The buying and selling of organs is prevalent in the black market of China. The organ trade is the trade of organs for organ transplantation. There is a shortage of organs available for transplantation which fuels a thriving black market for organs. Traditionally, Chinese culture dictates that organs should be buried and cremated for the individual to be reincarnated as a whole which has led to a dearth of bodies being donated. Therefore, China has resorted to harvesting organs from the bodies of prisoners for the use of organ transplants. According to an organ trafficking paper written by Budiani-Saberi and Delmonico, 11,000 transplants were performed in China using the organs of executed prisoners in 2006.

Of the transplants performed, 8,000 were kidney transplants, 3,000 were liver transplants, and 200 were heart transplants. In 2006, the 8,000 kidney transplants alone in China would have accounted for at least 10% of the total number of annual organ transplants done in programs of organ trafficking. However, since China has recently adopted the Human Transplantation Act that bans commercial use of prisoner organs, China has reduced the number of transplants to foreign patients by 50% in 2007.

According to a New Yorker article written by Jiayang Fan, even though China performs more transplants annually than any country except the United States, less than 1% of the population in need of life-saving transplants receives them (as compared to about 20% in the United States). According to China's Ministry of Health, some 1.5 million people continue to wait for transplants.

In 2021, UN human rights experts published that they were "extremely alarmed by reports of alleged 'organ harvesting' targeting minorities, including Falun Gong practitioners, Uyghurs, Tibetans, Muslims and Christians, in detention in China." According to the UN experts, it is a form of trafficking with a medical nature allegedly involving medical professionals. In August 2024, The Diplomat reported the first known survivor of forced organ harvest, Cheng Pei Ming, a Falun Gong practitioner.

=== Surrogacy ===
Although surrogacy in China is illegal, it is still a common practice among the wealthy Chinese population. In fact, in the past thirty years, over 25,000 children have been born to surrogate mothers in China. Most of these surrogate mothers are recruited from the countryside and are paid around 140,000 yuan. The couples looking for a surrogate mother go through an unlicensed agency that acts like a middleman and establishes communication with women willing to rent their wombs. The growing demand for surrogate mothers is based upon the fact that many urban Chinese are marrying later and postponing childbirth as work demands and the high costs of city living weigh couples down. In addition, vanity may also be involved as women continue to maintain their figures.

In particular, couples look for surrogate mothers the year before the dragon so that their children can be born on an auspicious year. Many wealthy couples often hire more than one surrogate mother to ensure that eight babies are born because eight is a lucky number in Chinese culture. In-vitro fertilization also produces a higher chance of having twins or triplets, leading to the circumvention of China's one-child policy. This exploitation of women's bodies has called for stricter laws against surrogacy. The Chinese Health Ministry has cracked down on many of these practices and even forced the abortion of fetuses by surrogate mothers when discovered.

== Anti-trafficking laws and policies ==
=== Law enforcement against trafficking ===
The Ministry of Public Security (MPS) last reported in 2016 a number of 1,004 investigations of possible trafficking cases, but did not give numbers since then. In May 2024 the Ministry claimed that trafficking had declined by two thirds over the previous five years but did not share any evidence of this.

As human trafficking is a prevalent problem within China, regulations and laws have been implemented to prohibit forms of trafficking. The Chinese government ratified the UN Trafficking in Persons Protocol in December 2009, which obligates China to prohibit all forms of trafficking and bring its domestic laws into conformity with international standards within 24 months. In 2010 the U.S. Department of State reported that China had "arrested 19 of the country’s 20 most wanted traffickers and pursuit of criminal networks and organized crime syndicates involved in trafficking."

The Chinese government passed several laws against trafficking and smuggling. The penalties for traffickers and buyers of the 'human goods' are high and severe. The laws against trafficking in women in China are as severe as the law prohibiting rape according to the U.S. Department of State in 2001. However, the amount of corruption and weak enforcement by officials have impeded the successful implementation of such laws and programs. In addition, police complicity with smugglers has further exacerbated the problem, leaving women vulnerable to trafficking and forced marriage.

Chinese law also prescribes the death penalty for certain offences of child trafficking. In the case of convicted child trafficker Yu Huaying, she was sentenced to death for abducting 17 children and selling them to other families, and the court deemed her conduct extremely heinous and warranted a harsh punishment. Yu was executed on 28 February 2025 after losing her appeal. Another case is the execution of Zhang Weiping and Zhou Rongping on 27 April 2023, who abducted multiple children and sold them via an intermediary nicknamed "Mei Yi". Mei Yi was arrested on 21 March 2026, and confessed to the child trafficking. As of 8 April 2026, the penalty is still undecided, but multiple lawyers in multiple media interviews expressed the opinion that she is likely to be sentenced to death.

=== Central government action ===
In a report by the Ministry of Public Security and the Ministry of Justice, details have been provided into combating human trafficking in China. For example, the report states that "since combating trafficking in women and children started nationally in 1991, a large number of cases of trafficking in women and children has been solved and handled and offenders severely punished according to law."

In 2008, courts nationwide convened to decide 1353 cases of trafficking in women and children which was a 9.91% increase of cases from 2007. In total, from the 1353 cases, 2161 offenders were sentenced, representing an 11.05% increase from 2007. Of those who were sentenced, 1319 were sentenced to more than 5 years of fixed-term imprisonment, life imprisonment or death, representing a 10.1% increase from 2007.

In 2009, courts nationwide decided 1636 cases of trafficking in women and children, representing a 20.9% increase from 2008. In total, 2413 offenders were sentenced, representing an 11.7% increase from 2008. Of those who were sentenced, 1475 were sentenced to more than 5 years of imprisonment, life imprisonment, or death, representing an 11.83% increase from 2008."

=== Organizations against trafficking ===
Several organisations within China have dedicated efforts to ameliorating the human trafficking situation. For example, Save the Children is a program that has helped fund research to gain a clearer understanding of issues like migration, trafficking, and street children to help promote safer migration. By educating children and young people about the dangers of trafficking, especially in communities of ethnic minorities, they will be better equipped to stay on their guard against trafficker organisations.

According to a pamphlet created by Save the Children debriefing the current situation in China, the organisation is "helping to build networks that migrants can turn to when they arrive in their destinations." They created a safe migration textbook for children that has been instituted into the education system in the Ping Xiang, Guanzi province. There is also child protection work at children's activity centres in cities like Nanning, Kunming, Shenzhen, and Shanghai with huge migrant communities.

Another organization, called the All-China Women's Federation, is an anti-trafficking education campaign aimed at educating vulnerable women and children to protect themselves against prevailing social and cultural perspectives that propagate human trafficking. The All-China Women's Federation is also involved in a collaboration project with Vietnam to combat trafficking on the borders.

Also, in 2016 TongJuBao.com, a collaborative mutual help model (also referred to sometimes as P2P Insurance) launched a Child Safety scheme intended to mobilise the resources of all members to fund professional rapid investigation support (supporting the family and police efforts) in case a child from the community should go missing.

=== Pressure from human rights and activist groups ===
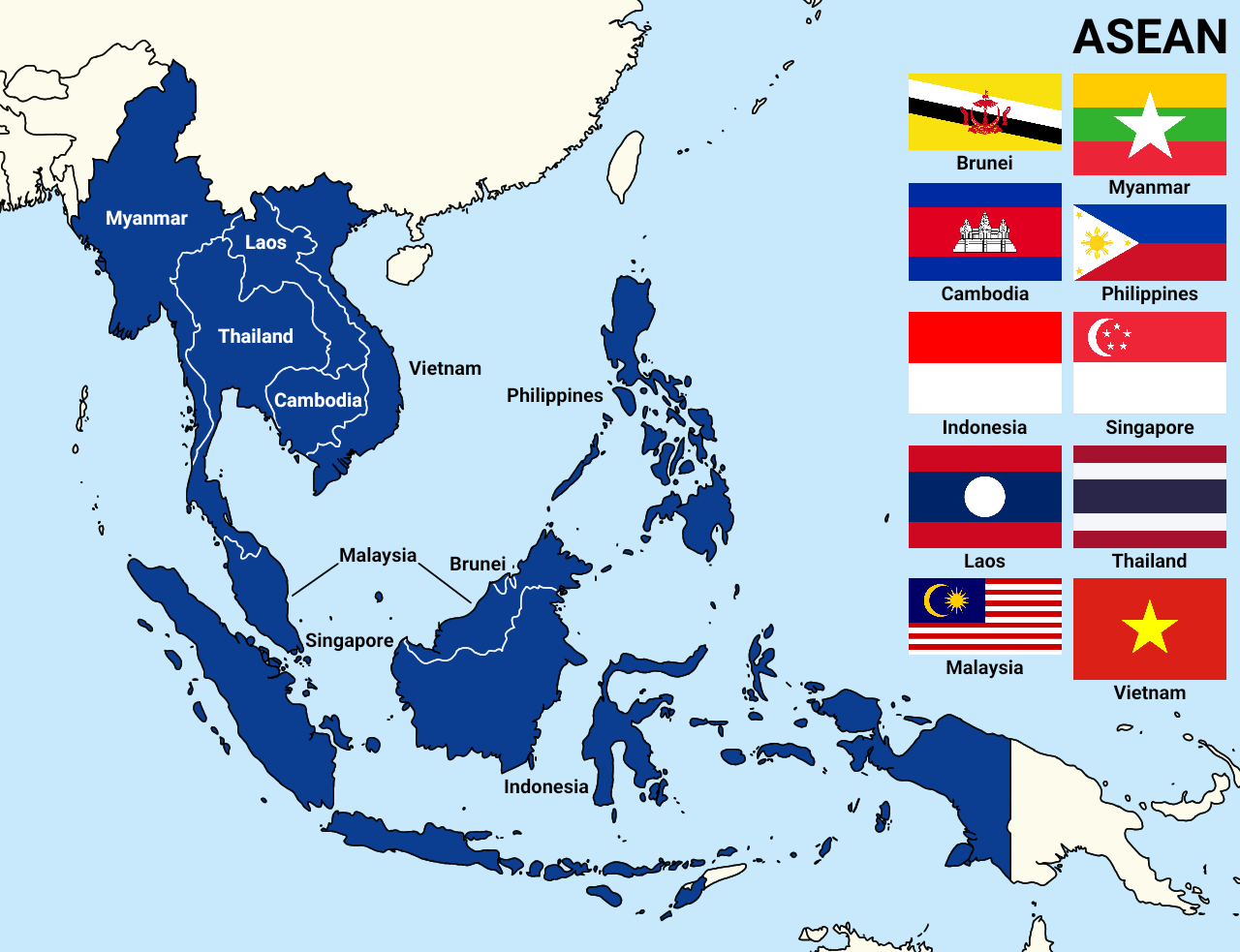
Countries in ASEAN

The Association of Southeast Asian Nations (ASEAN) signed its first human rights convention in November 2012 and committed itself to a trafficking agreement in 2014. Original ASEAN member countries formed in 1967 included Indonesia, Malaysia, Philippines, Singapore, and Thailand. It has expanded to include Bruenei, Cambodia, Laos, Myanmar, and Vietnam since then along with adding the ASEAN Plus Three of China, Japan, and Korea. These countries are dedicated to the fight against trafficking of people.

This includes commitments to work together to prevent trafficking, to identify and protect the victims, and to ensure that offenders are punished. According to Helen Stacy, director of the CDDRL Program on Human Rights and an FSI senior fellow, human rights issues are becoming integrated into regional discussions on trade and economic development. ASEAN, being a free trade organisation, has taken an interest in human trafficking because countries have begun to recognise that if they want to claim national governance credibility, they have to at least acknowledge the problem, sign human rights agreements, and start cooperating with their neighbours in combating human trafficking. One of the primary purposes of ASEAN is to prevent trafficking, protect victims and prosecute traffickers.

== See also ==
- Human rights in China
- Crime in China
- Sex trafficking in China
- Human Trafficking of North Korean Women in China
