= Slavery in China =

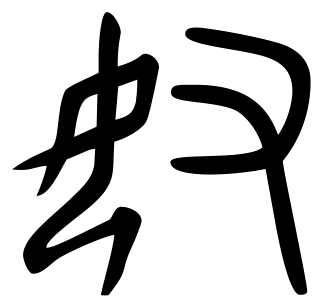
Earliest recorded form of the Chinese character 奴, meaning "slave." It depicts a woman (女) at left, being 'held' by a hand (又), which may suggest that slaves of the era were often captive women held as concubines and sex slaves.

Slavery in China has taken various forms throughout history. Slavery was nominally abolished in 1910, although the practice continued until at least 1949. The Chinese term for slave (simplified Chinese: 奴隶; traditional Chinese: 奴隸; pinyin: núlì) can also be roughly translated into 'subordinate servant'. Despite a few attempts to ban it, slavery existed continuously throughout pre-modern China, sometimes serving a key role in politics, economics, and historical events. However slaves in China were a very small part of the population due to a large peasant population that mitigated the need for large scale slave labor. The slave population included war prisoners and kidnapped victims or people who had been sold.

== General history ==
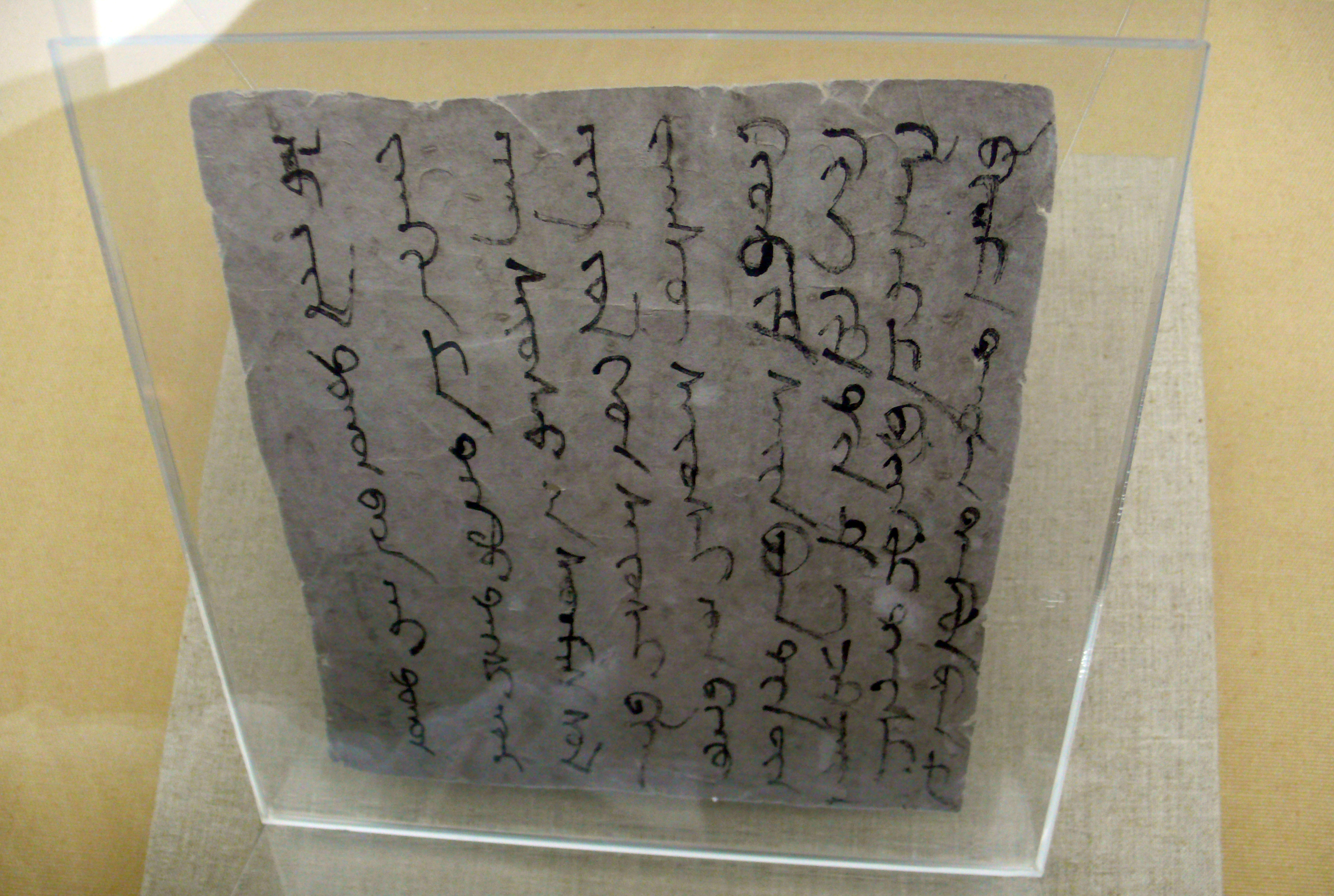
Slave contract written in Old Uyghur script

In Chinese society, slaves were grouped under a category of people known as the jianmin, which means "base" or "mean". Direct equivalents to large scale slavery such as classical Greece and Rome did not exist in ancient China. During the Shang dynasty and Zhou dynasty, slaves generally consisted of war captives or criminals, although peasants lived in a similar condition of perpetual servitude and were unable to leave their land or own it. Some people deliberately became slaves to escape imperial taxation, but they were still considered to be higher in status than traditional slaves, and inhabited a position somewhere between a slave and a commoner. From the Qin dynasty to Tang dynasty, slavery expanded beyond criminals and war captives. The Qin used large scale slave labor for public works such as land reclamation, road construction, and canal building.

Slavery declined during the economic boom of the Song dynasty in the 12th century. Advances in fertilizer, hydraulic, and agricultural technologies enabled the expansion of commercial crops such as medical herbs, mulberry, and cotton. The small land-to-population ratio enticed slaves to run away and seek better employment. During the Mongol-led Yuan dynasty and Manchu-led Qing dynasty, slavery of Chinese increased. These Chinese slaves to Mongols or Manchus were called bondsmen and became personal retainers of their imperial overlords. Some attained high positions and led other Chinese slaves. In the 19th century, due to concerted efforts to end the African slave trade, large numbers of Chinese laborers known as coolies were exported to replace slave labor. They were transported in cargo ships with conditions and practices nearly identical to the former African slave trade. Visitors to late 19th century China found little difference between the poor free and the slaves, both of which were treated as hired laborers.

A handful of emperors and officials throughout Chinese history have made efforts to limit or outlaw slavery. None were successful. In 100 BC, the Confucian scholar Dong Zhongshu advised Emperor Wu of Han to limit the amount of land and slaves whom people could own. In 9 AD, Wang Mang ordered the nationalization of large estates and their redistribution to farmers. Part of his reform was changing the institution of slavery so that they would become tax payers, since some impoverished farmers sold themselves or their children into slavery. In the 13th century AD, the jurist Ma Duanlin promulgated a policy limiting the number of slaves owned by officials and commoners to 30. In the 14th century, the Hongwu Emperor ordered an end to all slavery, but in practice slavery continued without heed to his commands. In the 18th century, the Yongzheng Emperor made similar attempts to abolish slavery. In 1909, the Qing officially abolished slavery, but due to internal turmoil and its demise, the institution persisted until 1949 when the People's Republic of China was founded.

== History of slavery in China by era ==
=== Ancient ===
The Shang dynasty engaged in frequent raids of surrounding states, obtaining captives who would be killed in ritual sacrifices. Scholars disagree as to whether these victims were also used as a source of slave labor.

The Warring States period (475–221 BC) saw a decline in slavery from previous centuries, although it was still widespread during the period. Since the introduction of private ownership of land in the state of Lu in 594 BC, which brought a system of taxation on private land, and saw the emergence of a system of landlords and peasants, the system of slavery began to later decline over the following centuries, as other states followed suit.

The Qin dynasty (221–206 BC) confiscated property and enslaved families as punishment. Large numbers of slaves were used by the Qin government to construct large-scale infrastructure projects, including road building, canal construction and land reclamation. Slave labor was quite extensive during this period.

Beginning with the Han dynasty (206 BC – 220 AD), one of Emperor Gao's first acts was to manumit agricultural workers enslaved during the Warring States period, although domestic servants retained their status. The Han dynasty promulgated laws to limit the possession of slaves: each king or duke was allowed a maximum of 200 slaves, an imperial princess was allowed a maximum of 100 slaves, other officials were limited to 30 slaves each. Sometimes instead of the death penalty, felons punished with castration during the Han dynasty were also used as slave labor. Deriving from earlier Legalist laws, the Han dynasty set in place rules penalizing criminals doing three years of hard labor or sentenced to castration by having their families seized and kept as property by the government.

As can be seen from the some historical records as “Duansheng, Marquis of Shouxiang, had his territory confiscated because he killed a female slave”(Han dynasty records of DongGuan), “Wang Mang's son Wang Huo murdered a slave, Wang Mang severely criticized him and forced him to commit suicide”(Book of Han: Biography of Wang Mang), murder against slaves was as taboo as murder against free people, and perpetrators were always severely punished. Ancient China can be said to be very distinctive compared to other countries of the same period (in most cases, lords were free to kill their slaves) in terms of slaves' human rights.

In the year 9 AD, the Emperor Wang Mang (r. 9–23 AD) usurped the Chinese throne and, to deprive landowning families of their power, instituted a series of sweeping reforms, including the abolition of slavery and radical land reform. Slavery was reinstated in AD 12 before his assassination in AD 23.

=== Medieval ===
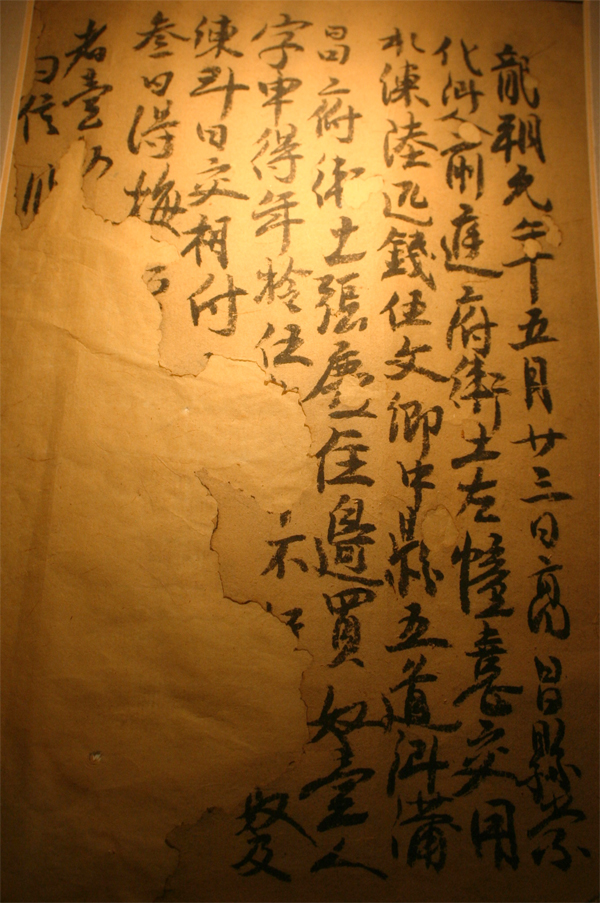
A contract from the Tang dynasty that records the purchase of a 15-year-old slave for six bolts of plain silk and five Chinese coins. Found in the Astana Cemetery in Turfan.

During the Three Kingdoms period (220–280 AD), a social status intermediate between freedom and slavery—Buqu (部曲)—developed on the social stage. Those with this status were legally subordinate to their masters, and lacked the right to manage their farmland, but they were recognized as property owners, and armed in time of war to serve as their master's private soldiers. The large decline in demographic figures from the Eastern Han period through the Three Kingdoms period is seen as being related to the emergence of this status class.

During the period of division from the Jin to the Sui dynasties, due to years of poor harvests, the influx of foreign tribes, and the resulting wars, the number of slaves exploded. They became a class and were called jianmin (贱民). The word literally means "inferior person". As stated in the Commentary on the Tang Code: “Slaves and inferior people are legally equivalent to livestock products”. They always had a low social status: even if they were deliberately murdered, the perpetrators received only a year in prison, and they were punished even when they reported the crimes of their lords. However, when stability returned, perhaps because the increase in the number of slaves slowed down again, the penalties for crimes against them became harsh again. For example, the famous Tang dynasty female poet Yu Xuanji was publicly executed for murdering her own slave.

The law of the Tang dynasty forbade enslaving free people, but allowed enslavement of criminals, foreigners, and orphans. Free people could, however, willingly sell themselves. The primary source of slaves was southern tribes, and young slave girls were the most desired. Although various officials such as Kong Kui, the Jiedushi of Lingnan, banned the practice, the trade continued. Female slaves from Yue (an ancient tribe in the area of Guangdong) were eroticized in a poem by Tang dynasty literary figure Yuan Zhen.

Chan and Zen Buddhist monastic slavery grew in the Tang dynasty as monasteries became increasingly wealthy and acquired more land. Monks were not generally required to work the fields they owned, with cultivation of farmland left in the hands of free laymen employed by the temples and temple slaves, although temple slaves were a far more significant share of the labor force, with 150,000 such slaves being emancipated during the Huichang Persecution of Buddhism. Some temple slaves were criminals, orphans (who were allowed to enter the monastery in adulthood), or previous tenants of land donated to the monasteries. However, a majority were laborers left unemployed during consolidations of estates by the monasteries who sold themselves to earn a livelihood. Temple slaves were permitted to marry each other, but not free peasants.

=== Early modern ===
The Song dynasty's (960–1279 AD) warfare against northern and western neighbors produced many captives on both sides, but reforms were introduced to ease the transition from bondage to freedom.

The Hongwu Emperor of the Ming dynasty (1368–1644 AD) sought to abolish all forms of slavery but in practice, slavery continued through the Ming dynasty.

The Javans sent 300 black slaves as tribute to the Ming dynasty in 1381. When the Ming dynasty crushed the Miao Rebellions in 1460, they castrated 1,565 Miao boys, which resulted in the deaths of 329 of them. They turned the survivors into eunuch slaves. The Guizhou Governor who ordered the castration of the Miao was reprimanded and condemned by Emperor Yingzong of Ming for doing it once the Ming government heard of the event. Since 329 of the boys died, they had to castrate even more. On 30 Jan 1406, the Ming Yongle Emperor expressed horror when the Ryukyuans castrated some of their own children to become eunuchs to give them to Yongle. Yongle said that the boys who were castrated were innocent and didn't deserve castration, and he returned the boys to Ryukyu and instructed them not to send eunuchs again.

Later Ming rulers, as a way of limiting slavery because of their inability to prohibit it, passed a decree that limited the number of slaves that could be held per household and extracted a severe tax from slave owners.

The Qing dynasty (1644–1912 AD) initially oversaw an expansion in slavery and states of bondage such as the booi aha. They possessed about two million slaves upon their conquest of China. However, like previous dynasties, the Qing rulers soon saw the advantages of phasing out slavery, and gradually introduced reforms turning slaves and serfs into peasants. Laws passed in 1660 and 1681 forbade landowners from selling slaves with the land they farmed and prohibited physical abuse of slaves by landowners. The Kangxi Emperor freed all the Manchus' hereditary slaves in 1685. The Yongzheng Emperor's "Yongzheng emancipation" between 1723 and 1730 sought to free all slaves to strengthen his authority through a kind of social leveling that created an undifferentiated class of free subjects under the throne, freeing the vast majority of slaves.

Among his other reforms, Taiping Rebellion leader Hong Xiuquan abolished slavery and prostitution in the territory under his control in the 1850s and 1860s.

In addition to sending Han exiles convicted of crimes to Xinjiang to be slaves of Banner garrisons there, the Qing also practiced reverse exile, exiling Inner Asian (Mongol, Russian and Muslim criminals from Mongolia and Inner Asia) to China proper where they would serve as slaves in Han Banner garrisons in Guangzhou. Russian, Oirats and Muslims (Oros. Ulet. Hoise jergi weilengge niyalma) such as Yakov and Dmitri were exiled to the Han banner garrison in Guangzhou.

=== Slavery by non-Han Chinese ===
In 1019, Jurchen pirates raided Japan for slaves. Only 270 or 259 Japanese on eight ships were returned when Goryeo managed to intercept them. The Jurchen pirates slaughtered Japanese men while seizing Japanese women as prisoners. Fujiwara Notada, the Japanese governor was killed. In total, 1,280 Japanese were taken prisoner, 374 Japanese were killed and 380 Japanese owned livestock were killed for food. Only 259 or 270 were returned by Koreans from the eight ships. The woman Uchikura no Ishime's report was copied down. Traumatic memories of the Jurchen raids on Japan in the 1019 Toi invasion, the Mongol invasions of Japan in addition to Japan viewing the Jurchens as "Tatar" "barbarians" after copying China's barbarian-civilized distinction, may have played a role in Japan's antagonistic views against Manchus and hostility towards them in later centuries such as when the Tokugawa Ieyasu viewed the unification of Manchu tribes as a threat to Japan. The Japanese mistakenly thought that Hokkaido (Ezochi) had a land bridge to Tartary (Orankai) where Manchus lived and thought the Manchus could invade Japan. The Tokugawa Shogunate bakufu sent a message to Korea via Tsushima offering help to Korea against the 1627 Manchu invasion of Korea. Korea refused it.

The Yuan dynasty (1271–1368 AD) expanded slavery and implemented harsher terms of service. In the process of the Mongol invasion of China proper, many Han Chinese were enslaved by the Mongol rulers. According to Japanese historians Sugiyama Masaaki (杉山正明) and Funada Yoshiyuki (舩田善之), there were also a certain number of Mongolian slaves owned by Han Chinese during the Yuan. Moreover, there is no evidence that Han Chinese suffered particularly cruel abuse.

== Conditions of slavery in premodern China ==
Slaves could either be bought and sold to their masters or inherit their role through birth. The majority of the Chinese slave market consisted of adolescents and young adults. Chinese law stated that families could only sell their children under the condition that doing so would save the rest of their family from starvation. Despite this law, the restrictions of human sales were rarely enforced. On some occasions, slaves were born into the family house by an existing slave thereby becoming a slave under that household by birth.

=== Slave contracts ===
If a slave was bought from their birth family and sold, a slave contract was created by the selling agency or agent (more commonly known as "people sellers" or ren fanzi). The contract stated the name of the person offering the slave, the name of the person buying the slave, the name of the selling agent, the name of the guarantor, the age of the slave and how many years the slave was to work for the new family, which was typically around 10–15 years. It also stated how much money was being exchanged for the slave. Most contracts for slave girls had a clause that the master was to choose a mate for the girl following the end of her time working. After the agreement was made, the slave was then transported, cleaned, trained, inspected and brought to their new master's home to start work. These contracts were often known as "white contracts", meaning contracts meant for common goods as opposed to "red contracts" which were reserved for more important matters such as land.

== Living conditions of slaves in premodern China ==
Slaves had very poor living conditions with little time to themselves and a small living space often shared with other slaves. They were confined to small mud or brick huts known as uk jai Punishment and abuse were regular occurrences for slaves in China and could sometimes result in extreme permanent injuries or even death in some cases. Abuse was rarely reported or looked into. The only instances where slave abuse was questioned was if the family or masters were under investigation by the police for another offence. After a master dies, his slaves are distributed evenly among the rest of the family members like all other property.

=== Male slaves ===
Due to the strict patriarchal system in China's history, boys were bought and sold for one of two reasons: to become an heir to a family with no son or to become a slave. Males were always in high demand due to their ability to become heirs and their higher physical capabilities. Therefore, they were four to five times more expensive than female slaves and were only owned by the elite families that could afford them; daughters and even land were sold before males of the family. Male slaves (sai man) were given the hardest and most demanding tasks. After their servitude, male slaves were either released from the main house to survive on their own, or they could have marriages arranged for them if their masters considered them to be extremely loyal or hard working. Those who were chosen to be married would be provided with an 'unlucky' woman, usually a person with disabilities or the daughter of another slave. If a male slave had a son, his slave status was inherited and the son remained the property of his father's master.

=== Female slaves ===
Women slaves were distinguished by their marital status rather than what kind of work they did. Married women who were slaves were similar to employees; they were paid wages and were free to leave the family house when they were not working. Unmarried women (called binü or yatou) however were unpaid and forced to remain on duty at all times. The children of a woman slave did not necessarily inherit her slave status, but there was a high possibility of becoming a slave themselves to avoid starvation. Oftentimes, women who found work outside of their family found themselves vulnerable to kidnapping, trafficking, and sexual violence.

"Slavery exists in China, especially in Canton and Peking ... I have known a male slave. He is named Wang and is a native of Kansu, living in Kuei-chou in the house of his original master's son, and with his own family of four persons acknowledged to me that he was a slave, Nu-p'u. He was a person of considerable ability, but did not appear to care about being free. Female slaves are very common all over China, and are generally called ...

YA-TOU 丫頭. Slave girl, a female slave. Slave girls are very common in China; nearly every Chinese family owns one or more slave girls generally bought from the girl's parents, but sometimes also obtained from other parties. It is a common thing for well-to-do people to present a couple of slave girls to a daughter as part of her marriage dowery. Nearly all prostitutes are slaves. It is, however, customary with respectable people to release their slave girls when marriageable. Some people sell their slave girls to men wanting a wife for themselves or for a son of theirs.

I have bought three different girls; two from Szű-chuan for a few taels each, less than fifteen dollars. One I released in Tientsin, another died in Hongkong; the other I gave in marriage to a faithful servant of mine. Some are worth much money at Shanghai."

==== Concubinage ====
Concubinage in China was a regular part of Chinese history. A slave who had sexual relations willingly or unwillingly with her master was considered to be a second wife rather than a slave, regardless of whether the master himself thought of her as such. A slave could also become a concubine if she was sold or given to another master as a gift. According to Chinese law, a man could have only one legal wife (qi), but could have as many concubines (qie) as he desired. On some occasions, the wife would select a concubine for her husband for the goal of getting a son and heir to the family line. Whether a child was born from the wife or a concubine, the wife was considered to be the mother.

== Modern slavery in China ==
=== Political prisoners ===
The Laogai system in China, short for Laodong Gaizao ("Laogai" or "Reeducation Through Labor") was established under the leadership of Mao Zedong, titled “Instructions on Thoroughly Eliminating Hidden Counterrevolutionaries” in the 1950s and continues to function in various forms today. It serves as a mechanism for the Chinese Communist Party to suppress dissent and enforce ideological conformity. Political prisoners, including those who oppose government policies or practice banned religions, are subjected to forced labor, often without trial or formal charges. These individuals endure grueling work conditions, psychological coercion, and physical abuse, all aimed at breaking their resistance and instilling party loyalty. Despite official claims of reform, the Laogai system persists under different names, continuing to exploit prisoners for economic gain. Products made through this forced labor have been found in international markets, raising concerns about human rights violations and the ethical implications of global trade.

=== Ethnic minorities ===
==== Uyghur ====
The Chinese Communist Party (CCP) government has been accused of systematically oppressing the Uyghur population in the Xinjiang region. Reports from human rights organizations and international media allege that over one million Uyghurs and other Muslim minorities have been detained in so-called 'reeducation camps,' where they are subjected to forced labor, political indoctrination, and harsh surveillance. Critics describe these practices as part of a broader campaign of cultural erasure and religious repression, with some experts and governments labeling it a form of modern-day slavery or even genocide. In 2026, the Office of the United Nations High Commissioner for Human Rights stated that China's policies toward the Uyghurs contain "coercive elements...so severe that they may amount to forcible transfer and/or enslavement as a crime against humanity."

==== Yi people ====
Throughout the 1930s and 1940s the Yi people (also known as Nuosu) of China terrorized Sichuan to rob and enslave non-Nuosu including Han people. The descendants of the Han slaves, known as the White Yi (白彝), outnumbered the Black Yi (黑彝) aristocracy by ten to one. There was a saying that can be translated as: "The worst insult to a Nuosu is to call him a 'Han'." (To do so implied that the Nuosu's ancestors were slaves.)

=== Laborers ===
Migrant construction workers, for instance, frequently face delayed or unpaid wages and are denied benefits such as medical and accident insurance, despite legal entitlements. In the tech industry, the illegal yet prevalent "996 working hour system" work from 9 a.m. to 9 p.m., six days a week—has led to widespread health issues, including fatigue and stress-related illnesses. Factory workers exposed to hazardous conditions often suffer severe health consequences without adequate compensation or medical support. Additionally, healthcare workers have reported numerous instances of unpaid wages and lack of social insurance contributions.

In 2007 and 2011 Chinese slave scandal, disabled men in central China were enslaved to work in kilns.

=== Females ===
The report of slavery in China to the Temporary Slavery Commission (TSC) of 1924–1926 described the Mui Tsai trade in girls, which was a matter given international attention at this point. Hong Kong refused to provide any information with the motivation that there was no slavery in Hong Kong.

=== North Koreans ===
North Korean women have been subject to human trafficking in China. Many have been subjected to forced marriages and sexual slavery. Then China repatriated North Korean defectors back to North Korea.

=== Prisoners of war ===
Imperial Japanese authorities and authorities in the Japanese puppet state of Manchukuo used Chinese prisoners of war for forced labor.

== See also ==
- History of slavery in Asia
- Slavery in Japan

== Bibliography ==
- Abramson, Marc S. (2008), Ethnic Identity in Tang China, University of Pennsylvania Press
- Barbieri-Low, Anthony Jerome (2007), Artisans in early imperial China, University of Washington Press
- Benn, Charles (2002), Daily Life in Traditional China: The Tang Dynasty, Greenwood Press
- Du, Shanshan (2013), Women and Gender in Contemporary Chinese Societies, Lexington Books
- Harrasowitz, O. (1991), Journal of Asian History, Volume 25, O. Harrassowitz.
- Lewis, Mark Edward (2007), The Early Chinese Empires: Qin and Han, The Belknap Press of Harvard University Press
- Lozny, Ludomir R. (2013), Continuity and Change in Cultural Adaptation to Mountain Environments, Springer
- Mitamura, Taisuke (1970), Chinese eunuchs: the structure of intimate politics, C.E. Tuttle Co.
- Ramsey, S. Robert (1987), The Languages of China, Princeton University Press
- Schafer, Edward H. (1963), The Golden Peaches of Samarkand: A Study of T'ang Exotics, University of California Press
- Toh, Hoong Teik (2005), Materials for a Genealogy of the Niohuru Clan, Harrassowitz Verlag
- Tsai, Shih-shan Henry (1996), The Eunuchs in the Ming Dynasty, SUNY Press
