= Human trafficking in North Korea =

Human trafficking in North Korea (Democratic People's Republic of Korea or DPRK) extends to men, women, and children for the purpose of forced labour, and/or commercial sexual exploitation for the trafficker (source country).

== Trafficking by type ==
=== Bride and sex trafficking in China ===
Many North Korean women fall victim to human trafficking upon migrating to the People's Republic of China. North Korea's discrimination of women in the workforce, the traditional familial view of women as a burden, and the region's ever-increasing poverty serve as factors that motivate them to migrate to their neighboring country to find a better life. China's one-child policy decreased the number of women in the country, growing the demand for trafficked sex workers and brides. As of 2020, an estimated 80% of North Korean defectors were women, 60% of whom were sold in China's extensive human trafficking network. Women and girls who are trafficked are bought by cybersex brokers, sold into marriage, and forced into prostitution. As of 2023, there are up to 500,000 such women and girls in China's northern provinces of Jilin, Liaoning, and Heilongjiang, where human trafficking industry exploded, reaching $105 million per year. North Korea's punishments for defectors and China's lack of legal protection for North Korean refugees force women to withstand abuse to avoid facing deportation.

=== Forced labor ===
According to the United States Department of State (DOS), forced labor in North Korea is part of an established system of political repression. North Koreans do not have a choice in the jobs they work and are not free to change jobs at will; the North Korean government determines what work each citizen will have. From April to September 2009, the government initiated a "150-Day Battle" campaign to boost the economy by requiring increased work hours and production targets of citizens, and implementing government-imposed programs, such as road building and construction work. The country initiated a second "labor mobilization" campaign, the "100-Day Battle," immediately after the initial "150-Day Battle."

The DOS finds that the North Korean government is directly involved in subjecting North Koreans to forced labor in prison camps. An estimated 150,000 to 200,000 persons are held in detention camps in remote areas of the country; many of these prisoners were not duly convicted of a criminal offense. In prison camps, all prisoners, including children, are subject to forced labor, including logging, mining, and farming for long hours under harsh conditions. Reports indicate that political prisoners endure severe conditions, including little food or medical care, and brutal punishments; many are not expected to survive. Many prisoners have fallen ill or died, due to harsh labor conditions, inadequate food, beatings, lack of medical care, and unhygienic conditions.

=== North Korean workers sent abroad ===
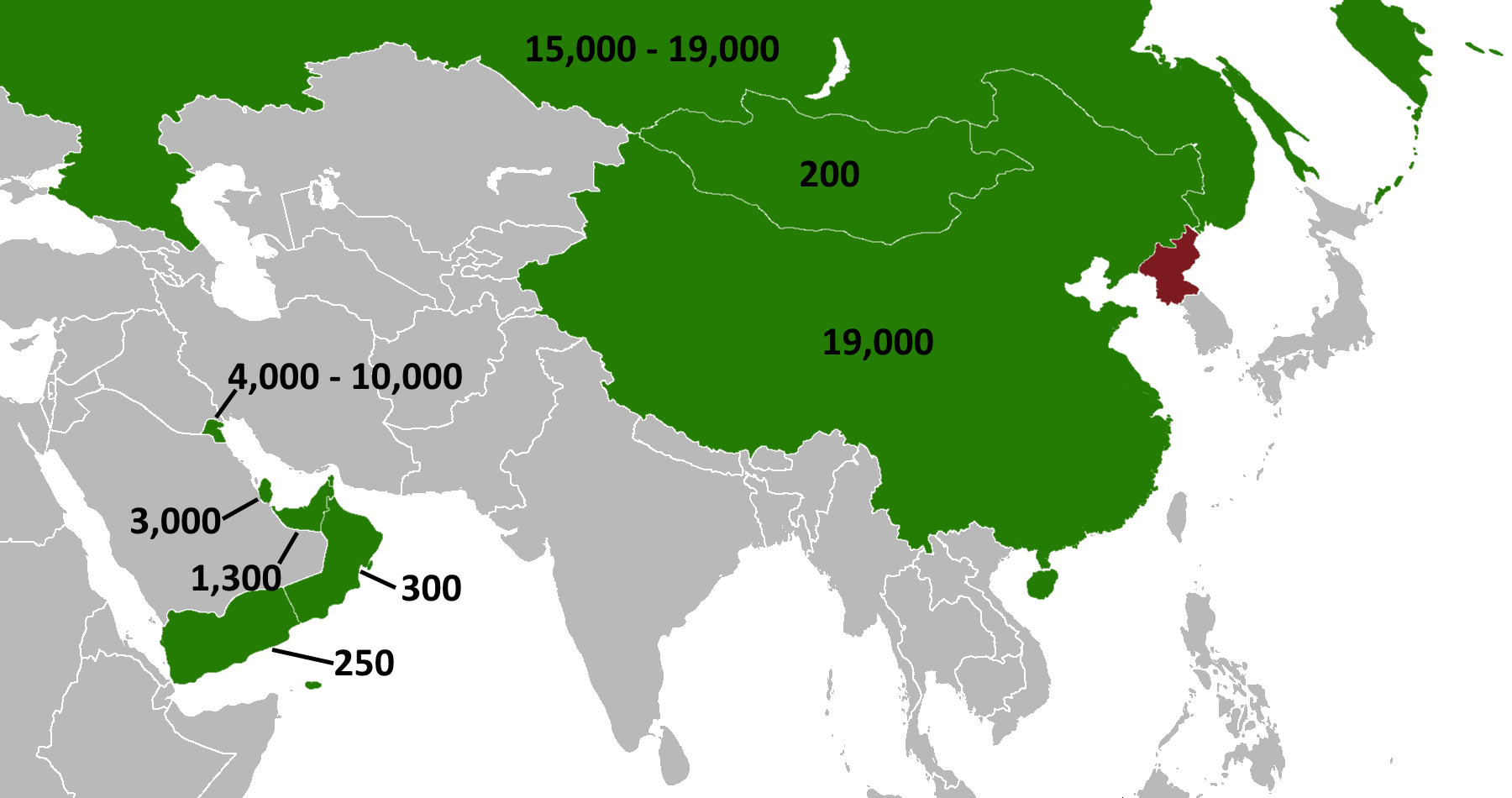
Number of North Korean migrant workers in Asia

According to the DOS, the North Korean government recruits workers for bilateral contracts with foreign governments, including in Russia, countries in Africa, Central and Eastern Europe, East and Southeast Asia, including Mongolia, and the Middle East. There are credible reports that many North Korean workers sent abroad by the regime under these contracts are subjected to forced labor, with their movement and communications constantly under surveillance and restricted by North Korean government "minders."

The DOS finds credibility in claims that state that North Korean workers face threats of government reprisals against them or their relatives in North Korea if they attempt to escape or complain to outside parties. Worker salaries are deposited into accounts controlled by the North Korean government, which keeps most of the money, claiming fees for various "voluntary" contributions to government endeavors. Workers only receive a fraction of the money paid to the North Korean government for their work.

As of 2019, the DOS estimates tens of thousands of North Korean workers to be employed in Russian logging camps, where they reportedly have only two days of rest per year and face punishments when they fail to meet production targets. Wages of some North Korean workers employed in Russia reportedly were withheld until the laborers returned home, in a coercive tactic by North Korean authorities to compel their labor. North Korean workers at joint ventures with foreign investors within North Korea are employed under arrangements similar to those that apply to overseas contract workers.

Since Kim Jong-un became leader of North Korea in 2011, the number of workers sent abroad has increased rapidly in order to obtain foreign currency and bypass international sanctions. In 2012 it was estimated that 60–65,000 North Koreans had been sent abroad to work in more than 40 countries and in 2015 these workers were estimated to number 100,000. In 2016 North Korea earned £1.6 billion (about US$2.3 billion) a year from workers sent abroad worldwide according to one source and £1 billion (about US$1.3 billion) according to another source.

In response to North Korea's launch of a ballistic missile in 2017, the U.N. Security Council has unanimously approved sanctions against North Korea, including the return home of all North Koreans working overseas within 24 months. In December 2019, some countries had still not met these obligations. The U.N Security Council has thus set a deadline of December 22, 2019, when sanctions would take effect. However, it was reported that North Korea had found ways of circumventing the sanctions and started using a loop hole that allowed tourist or student visas. The resolution forbids extending or providing workers visas, allowing North Korea to change the type of visa requested to student or travel visa. Reportedly, in 2018, hundreds of North Koreans were working in China under a trainee status. Moreover, North Korea has been sending students abroad pretending they are part of an exchange student program, while they are spending most of the time working in different businesses.

== North Korean government response ==
The North Korean government does not fully comply with the US Department of State's minimum standards for the elimination of trafficking and the DOS finds that they are not making significant efforts to do so. The government has explicitly denied that human trafficking is a problem. Authorities do not differentiate between trafficking and other forms of illegal border crossing, and victims are punished for violation of migration laws. The government contributes to the problem of trafficking through its harsh restrictions on emigration and through its forced labor prison camps, where North Koreans live in conditions of servitude, receiving little food and little if any medical care.

=== Prosecution ===
US State Department reports find that the North Korean government made little, if any, efforts to combat trafficking in persons through law enforcement efforts over the period 2015–2016, and continued to severely restrict the movement of its citizens internally and across its borders. The North Korean government continues to deny the existence of trafficking as a problem. Little information is available on North Korea's internal legal system. The country's Penal Code prohibits crossing the border without permission; these laws are used against both traffickers and trafficking victims.

The DOS finds it doubtful that North Korean laws are adequate to address trafficking. Article 150 of the Penal Code criminalizes inter alia the abduction, sale, or trafficking of children. Article 7 of the 1946 Law on Equality of the Sexes forbids trafficking in women. However, fair trials do not occur in North Korea. It is not made clear under what provisions of the law, if any, traffickers are prosecuted. Laws used to prosecute traffickers and trafficking victims are those that seek to limit all cross-border migration, including refugee outflows, and often end up harming victims.

Reports reviewed by the DOS indicate that more restrictions have been imposed on leaving North Korea, and there are reports of more severe punishments being imposed on those who seek to leave the country and those who are forcibly returned. Reports by North Korean defectors include instances of the government punishing traffickers; however, NGO reports indicate that the "traffickers" may include activists or professional border crossers who assist North Koreans voluntarily leaving for China. There were no known trafficking prosecutions or convictions during the reporting period.

=== Protection ===
DOS reports find that the North Korean government does not make any known attempts to identify individuals as victims of trafficking or assist victims of trafficking. On the contrary, victims undergo severe abuse by the regime if caught attempting to cross the border or if deported back to North Korea by the Chinese government. While authorities screened repatriated North Koreans for contacts with South Koreans and exposure to South Korean cultural influences, they did not make a distinction between trafficking victims and illegal immigrants.

According to the DOS, North Koreans forcibly repatriated by Chinese authorities, including a significant number of women believed to be trafficking victims, are sent to prison camps, where they may be subject to forced labor, torture, sexual abuse by prison guards, or other severe punishment. Repatriated victims who are suspected of having become pregnant with a child of possible Chinese paternity may be subject to forced abortions and infanticide; reports indicate that prison authorities may kill babies born to repatriated victims while in prison. The government did not ensure that trafficking victims are not penalized for unlawful acts committed as a direct result of being trafficked.

The DOS reports that internal conditions in North Korea prompt many North Koreans to flee the country, making them particularly vulnerable to human traffickers. North Korea continues to ban the existence of indigenous NGOs, and there are no international NGOs in the country that work to prevent trafficking or assist trafficking victims. North Korea is not a party to the 2000 UN TIP Protocol.

== See also ==
- Human rights in North Korea
- North Korea's illicit activities
- Human Trafficking of North Korean Women in China
