= Abortion in North Korea =

Overview of the legality and prevalence of abortions in North Korea

Abortion in North Korea has been illegal for most of the country's history, except for it being made legal in 1983 until being banned again in 1993. However, its abortion laws have often been loosely enforced. During the 1970s, abortion seems to have been generally tolerated and modern contraceptives were widely available. Reportedly, a law passed in 2015 banned birth control devices and imposed fines and imprisonment for people who provide abortions. A lack of contraceptives and abortion services in hospitals has led to a rise in unsafe abortions. However, According to the UN's 2017 World Population Policies report, abortion is available in North Korea for all reasons, including upon request, and without gestational limits.

Forced abortions in prison camps and detention facilities are often performed by state security officials in North Korea. Forced abortions are carried out for people with disabilities, political prisoners, and in instances of pregnancy from rape by government officials or prison guards. An official ideology of maintaining racial purity mandates the termination of pregnancies that would result in half-Chinese babies. North Korean women who have been sold into prostitution or marriage in China and then forcibly repatriated receive abortions if they are pregnant with non-Korean babies.

== History ==
For much of its history, knowledge about the status of abortion in North Korea has been fragmentary. Abortion seems to have been banned early on in the country's history. By the 1970s, despite the ban, it appears to have been generally tolerated.

During the 1970s and 1980s, North Korea promoted modern contraception. Since the mid-1970s, oral contraceptives, condoms, and intrauterine devices (IUDs) were available in obstetric hospitals at maternal counseling centers. With a culture that was increasingly sexually liberated, and with the rise of prostitution since the late 1980s, premarital and extramarital pregnancies increased. Abortion was made legal in 1983 but was banned again in 1993. Despite a shift in policy to encourage childbirth in the 1990s, contraceptives continued to be available.

A 1998 reproductive health survey by the Population Institute found that the abortion rate among married women in North Korea was 1.77%. With the promotion of family planning services, the rate dropped to 1.11% by 2001. According to the United Nations Development Programme's 2014 Socio-Economic Demographic and Health Survey, 11% of married North Korean women had previously had an abortion. There is no evidence that sex-selective abortions are practiced in North Korea.

In October 2015, it was reported that North Korean authorities had banned abortions and the implantation of birth control devices such as IUDs in "an effort to reverse the isolated country's falling birth rate". (Note: The birth rate in North Korea was 6.5 in 1966. Both South and North Korea underwent drastic declines in birth rates in the 1970s, and the birth rate in North Korea was 2.5 in 1988 and 2.0 in 2013.) According to Radio Free Asia, a source within North Korea indicated that gynaecologists who performed abortions would be fined, while non-gynaecologists would be imprisoned for up to three years. Prior to 2015, there were already "punishments for those who perform illegal abortions and use contraceptive devices" though it is unclear how often these were enforced. North Korean women who are not married undergo birth control procedures and obtain illegal abortions in the homes of doctors or midwives to avoid detection. A lack of contraceptives and abortion services in hospitals has led to a rise in unsafe abortions, especially in remote areas such as Hyesan.

== Forced abortions ==
According to reports by defectors and non-governmental organisations, women in North Korea have been subject to forced abortions by state security officials. Forced abortions are particularly common with North Korean women who became pregnant in China and were forcibly repatriated to North Korea. As early as 2002, there were reports of forced abortions and infanticide in prisons.

Victims of human trafficking in North Korea, who are forced into marriages and prostitution in China, are forcibly repatriated to North Korea if they attempt to escape. In June 2022, the Committee for Human Rights in North Korea and the War Crimes Committee of the International Bar Association reported that a multi-year investigation demonstrated evidence of a North Korean policy of "forcibly ending pregnancies that would result in half-Chinese babies". The report concluded that the policy was "driven by official ideology that emphasizes the importance of maintaining the purity of the Korean race at all costs".

Forced abortions have also been reported at political prison camps (kwallisos) after prison guards raped detainees. According to a 2022 report by the U.S. State Department, forced abortions are also common for people with disabilities, political prisoners, and pregnancy from rape by government officials. A 1992 study found that high-risk pregnancies were closely monitored and that abortions were performed on deformed fetuses following ultrasounds in the sixth month of pregnancy.

== See also ==
- Women in North Korea
