= 2007 Chinese slave scandal =

Forced labour scandal in Shanxi, China

The 2007 Chinese slave scandal (simplified Chinese: 山西黑砖窑案; traditional Chinese: 山西黑磚窯案; pinyin: Shānxī Hēi Zhuān Yáo àn; lit. 'Shanxi Black Brick Kiln incident') was a series of forced labour cases in Shanxi, China. Thousands of Chinese people including many children had been forced to work as slaves in illegal brickyards, and were tortured by the owners of the brickyards. As of June 2007, approximately 550 people have been rescued from such situations by the Chinese Communist Party (CCP).

== Background ==
Shanxi is located in the Loess Plateau in northern China which is known for its rich clay deposits which are easier and cheaper to mine than coal. Through corrupt relationships with officials, slave "bosses" opened illegal brickyards. Due to a scarcity of labor in Shanxi, some factories outsourced production to middlemen who recruited workers from other provinces, making huge profits for the bosses. For example, in one notorious case, it was reported that Wang Bingbing, the son of Wang Dongyi, a secretary of a local CCP branch, was the owner of a brickyard located in Hongdong County, Linfen. The owner outsourced the brickyard to Heng Tinghan, who was from Henan. The brickyard produces 10,000 bricks per day. The market price for 10,000 bricks is about 2,000 to 3,000 yuan; the owner, however, paid only 360 yuan to Heng per 10,000 bricks produced. Wang Bingbing and Heng Tinghan, along with three other employees, including Heng's son, were later charged with a variety of crimes including murder, illegal detention, and forced labor.

The existence of illegal brickyards was first reported to authorities in 1998. On 1 May, Chen Jianjiao, a representative of the Shanxi People's Congress, received a telephone call from a laborer who had escaped from an illegal brickyard. The escaped man also wrote to the chairman of the Shanxi People's Congress. As a result, slave rescue operations were carried out by provincial government authorities without notifying local officials. Over 150 slaves, three of them child laborers, were freed from these illegal brickyards. Chen Jianjiao himself was responsible for helping to free hundreds of them.

== Incident ==
There have been continuing reports of cruelty committed at Shanxi's illegal brickyards since 2004. On 7 May 2007, Henan TV Metro Channel reported the case of five minors around sixteen years old who had disappeared from the environs of Zhengzhou Railway Station. Having heard of earlier instances of child laborers being kidnapped for brickyards in Shanxi, their parents suspected their children might be found there. Two months later these five were among fifty minors from Henan who were found at an illegal brickyard. Human traffickers had sold them to brickyards for 500 Yuan each. Later in 2011, it was found that the practice had not abated, as disabled men in Zhengzhou were still being kidnapped and forced to labor in the brickyards. The scandal was only uncovered following an undercover investigation.

On 10 May, reporters from Henan Television, accompanied by two parents, visited the sites of some illegal brickyards in Shanxi undercover. Reporters later visited many illegal brickyards in Yuncheng and Jincheng. The conditions they found were clearly those of slavery.

Concealed camera revealed that the local police refused to take action to rescue the slaves. Later the reporters were allowed into the illegal brickyards with the company of the local police. Concealed camera showed the police keeping them from rescuing children who were not from Henan which showed obvious local government protection for the illegal brickyards.

== Working conditions ==
The brickyard owners had purchased laborers from human traffickers to use as slaves. Many of the slaves were sold for CNY300 to CNY400 including delivery. The slaves included children as young as eight years old and teenagers. Moreover, brickyard owners hired guards and wolfdogs to watch their slaves. These slaves were forced to work over sixteen hours every day and any mistakes were punished by brutal torture.

One teenager who was rescued from an illegal brickyard said that, during his slavery, he had been taken to another brickyard by his boss to watch another slave being fed to a meat grinder.

== Investigation ==
As the scandal received immediate media attention, it also caught the eyes of the major party and state leaders, including CCP General Secretary Hu Jintao and Chinese Premier Wen Jiabao. Governor Yu Youjun of Shanxi province offered an unprecedented self-criticism, took responsibility, and tendered his resignation on 30 August. He was replaced by Meng Xuenong, an official who had been sacked as Beijing mayor after the SARS outbreak.

In June and July 2007, 570 people in Shanxi and Henan were freed by the Chinese Communist Party and Chinese government. Of those rescued, sixty-nine of them were children. In response, the Chinese government assembled a force of 35,000 police to check northern Chinese brickyards for slaves, sent dozens of brickyard supervisors to prison, punished ninety-five low level officials in Shanxi province for dereliction of duty, and sacked twenty-four. One brickyard foreman, Heng Tinghan, was sentenced to life in prison, and an employee of his, Zhao Tanbing, earned the death penalty for killing a mentally handicapped slave.

== See also ==
- Economy of China
- Slavery in China
