= Human trafficking of North Korean women in China =

Many North Korean women fall victim to human trafficking upon migrating to the People's Republic of China. North Korea's discrimination of women in the workforce, the traditional familial view of women as a burden, and the region's ever-increasing poverty serve as factors that motivate them to migrate to their neighboring country to find a better life. China's one-child policy decreased the number of women in the country, growing the demand for trafficked sex workers and brides. As of 2020, an estimated 80% of North Korean defectors were women, 60% of whom were sold in China's extensive human trafficking network. Women and girls who are trafficked are bought by cybersex brokers, sold into marriage, and forced into prostitution. As of 2023, there are up to 500,000 such women and girls in China's northern provinces of Jilin, Liaoning, and Heilongjiang, where human trafficking industry exploded, reaching $105 million per year. North Korea's punishments for defectors and China's lack of legal protection for North Korean refugees force women to withstand abuse to avoid facing deportation.

== History ==
After the dissolution of the Soviet Union in the year 1991 and wavering ties with Russia and China, the North Korean regime lost financial support and fell into an increasingly severe economic depression. Many factories shut down due to a lack of natural resources and an inability to pay laborers, forcing the government to drastically cut food rations. In 1994, Kim Jung Il announced that citizens had to be self-sufficient because he was shutting down the railway system, leaving many people without access to food. The ensuing famine exacerbated by "agricultural disasters" killed 2 million North Koreans from 1996 to 1999. In 2002, new economic policies increased the cost of food by 50% and decreased the purchasing power of money, this matter forcing people to spend 75 to 85% of money on groceries. The ever-worsening starvation conditions in North Korea motivated families to migrate to the neighboring nation of China. In the decade leading to 2006, 100,000 North Korean immigrants entered China searching for food and job security through the Yalu and Tumen rivers.

The $105 million trafficking market of North Korean women is mainly powered by the demand of the Shandong, Fujian, and Guangdong villages and the supply of the Yunnan province. China's one-child policy enacted in 1980 fueled the desire for trafficked women. When it was implemented, the law motivated an increase in female infanticides and sex-selective abortions, creating the alarming ratio of 14 men to 1 woman that rural areas have today. According to the United Nations Human Rights Council, men outnumbered women in China by 34 million in 2014. The cultural practice of the commodifying of women also plays a role in China's rampant human trafficking situation, as, historically, Confucian beliefs encouraged families to sell women into concubinage and servitude.

== North Korean experiences with human trafficking ==
Some North Korean women are initially willing to be smuggled across the border in hopes of finding a better life. Although this is true, many women consent to this without knowing they are going to be trafficked, they can only hope for the best. Many times, smugglers promise to help them in good faith, but eventually sell them to trafficking brokers. Traffickers lure Korean women into migrating by promising them normal jobs in China like working as a maid or factory worker and then force them into the commercial sex industry. In other cases, North Korean women are sold by their own family in the hopes that, in China, they will work to provide them with financial support. Some families also sell their North Korean daughters as brides to Chinese men under the false premise that they will receive compensation.

There are many factors that facilitate the trafficking of North Korean women and girls, such as the fact that most traffickers are of ethnic Korean-Chinese men who are fluent in Korean, this circumstance increasing the trust these women have in their smugglers. Other factors include the corruption among border guards that allow the smuggling of women and the tendency of trafficked individuals to help traffic other Korean women. In 2019, 15% of the women and girls who were trafficked were bought by cybersex brokers, 30% were sold as brides, and 50% were forced into prostitution. While under the control of their captors, more than 60% of women experienced physical and psychological abuse. Trafficked North Korean women are forced to participate in sex, gang-rape, depraved cybersex performances, and hard labor (when sold to men in rural areas). Traffickers also try to break trafficked women's spirits to flee by chaining them for long periods of time and submitting them through prolonged rape periods. Women who forcefully refuse to be trafficked are beaten, starved, and even killed.

== Legislation ==
=== North Korea ===
The North Korean government claimed not having a human trafficking case for more than 50 years, an assertion that has maintained people ignorant of the trafficking of their female citizens. Despite this claim, trafficked defectors are frequently caught in China and are sent to the North Korean-Chinese border to be interrogated, beaten, searched, and tortured at police stations or detention centers. If found guilty, trafficking brokers fare even worse, as those that are caught are sentenced to death and executed publicly. On the other hand, trafficking victims are tried as political criminals and sent to labor camps for at least 5 years to perform hard labor under poor working conditions. In these labor camps, repatriated pregnant women are subject to induced abortions and infanticide as a way to keep North Korean lineages pure and rid the government of responsibility from financially supporting "foreign-blooded children".

According to a 2021 report by the US Department of State, the North Korean government compels its citizens to work in China as forced labor (likely known and possibly sanctioned by China) to generate revenue for the North Korean government. The forced labor involves working in hotels and restaurants as well as in cyber operations.

=== China ===
China refuses to acknowledge North Koreans as refugees due to its prioritization of its 1986 Repatriation Agreement with the communist country. To justify their deportation and rid itself of the financial responsibility of providing asylum to North Koreans, China labels them as economic migrants. In doing so, it excuses itself from violating the United Nations' Refugee Convention of 1951, repatriating about 6,000 North Koreans annually. The Human Rights Watch reported that China recently repatriated 500 North Korean refugees on October 9, 2023. Consistent with its treatment of refugees, China has refused to sign the UN's Protocol to Prevent, Suppress, and Punish Trafficking in Persons, especially Women and Children formulated in the year 2000.

Although China does not consider North Koreans as refugees, it has taken multiple measures to discourage their migration and has implemented laws to diminish the prevalence of human trafficking. As of 2002, China officially increased police surveillance to watch for undocumented migrants and intensified the deportation of Korean defectors. China also began to pay Chinese citizens to turn in Korean refugees and punished those who illegally helped them. It fined employers up to US$600 for employing North Koreans, a matter that increased women's vulnerability to being trafficked. It is estimated that, in 2013, 1978 brokers were convicted for trafficking women and children in China upon the implementation of stricter surveillance measures.

=== International law ===
International bodies like the United Nations have taken action to remedy the trafficking of North Koreans. In 1951, prior to the boom of human trafficking in China, the United Nations ratified the Refugee Convention, a document that protects refugees universally. Due to China's agreement to comply with the document, the UN has repeatedly urged the country to protect defectors who are afraid of repatriation. Not only has China refused to abide by the convention, but it has repeatedly turned down the UN High Commission on Refugees' requests to turn over North Korean refugees to them.

International attitudes to helping trafficked North Korean refugees vary. A source indicates that the global community has formerly threatened China with sanctions, but that the threats were inconsistent and weak, allowing China to neglect the issue.

As of 2013, the United States Department of State placed China on its Tier 3 Watch List due to its human trafficking problem. Other countries are not as sensitive to this humanitarian crisis, as South Korea holds a discriminatory attitude towards North Korean refugees. The Seoul government is "remarkably unwilling to accept" the 1000 migrants that try to enter its city every year due to the belief that the refugees' lack of education will make them a burden to society. Despite this fact, North Koreans are considered citizens of South Korea immediately upon crossing the border.

== Types of human trafficking ==
=== Bride trafficking ===
North Korean women who are trafficked are promised a better life by bride traffickers if they agree to marry Chinese or Korean-Chinese men. A lot of women willingly accept because they fear that they will die of starvation if they stay in their country. Although some North Korean women agree to arranged marriages in China in order to escape extreme poverty, many brokers deceive these vulnerable women by selling them into the sex industry or to undesirable partners (such as old, disabled, drunkard, or drug-using men). Women who cross safely may also be sold into marriage when kidnapped in areas where illegal migrants congregate. Prices for women vary in China from US$120 to US$1200. North Korean women are desired by Chinese men because they find them to be ideal wife prospects due to the perception that they are "respectful and obedient". Despite their popularity among purchasers, many men are sometimes reluctant to buy them because marriages with defectors are not legally recognized by the Chinese government. If found, the family could be heavily fined and the Korean bride repatriated. There are systemic barriers in China that keep women from escaping forced marriages. When wives run away, husbands can contact brokers and use their help to recapture brides. Trafficked brides are sometimes sold again by their Chinese partners or kidnapped by their marriage traffickers. Chinese police and border guards are also accomplices. They arrest women under the premises of deportation but then sell them to other men.

=== Prostitution ===
Chinese venues of prostitution involve unlikely, average businesses such as hair salons, karaoke bars, hotels, saunas, cafes, and bathhouses, among others. North Korean female defectors between the ages of 15 and 25 are the group most severely abused in such places, where those trafficked experience abuse such as like gang-rape, groping, vaginal rape, and forced masturbation. Victims forced to work in such brothels sometimes catch venereal diseases. Despite the health risks and social degradation they are subjected to in such acts, oftentimes these women only receive a small fraction of what customers pay for sex services.

=== Cybersex ===
Captured North Korean women and girls are forced to livestream their sexual abuse by cybersex business owners. When sold into the cybersex industry, a Chinese purchaser usually keeps multiple women locked in an apartment performing sexual acts 7 days a week, for as many as 17 hours at a time. Sometimes, women are physically abused and made dependent on drugs in order to keep them from escaping. Emancipated Korean victims of cybersex traffickers are a few of the reliable sources that currently exist for documenting the daily life of individuals made to work in cybersex dens.
