= MTV Movie Award for Best Fight =

Annual film award

- Awarded for: Quality fight scenes
- Country: United States
- Presented by: MTV
- First award: 1996
- Final award: 2023
- Website: www.mtv.com/ontv/movieawards/

The MTV Movie Award for Best Fight is an award presented to actors and characters for quality fight scenes in films at the MTV Movie Awards, a ceremony established in 1992. Honors in several categories are awarded by MTV at the annual ceremonies, and are chosen by public vote. The MTV Movie Award for Best Fight was first presented in 1996 to Adam Sandler and Bob Barker for their fight in Happy Gilmore. Uma Thurman won the award in 2004 and 2005 for her fights against Chiaki Kuriyama and Daryl Hannah in Kill Bill: Volume 1 and Volume 2, respectively. In 2008 and 2009, Cam Gigandet was presented with the honor for his fights in Never Back Down and Twilight. Robert Pattinson has also won the award twice, for his appearances in The Twilight Saga films: Twilight in 2009, and The Twilight Saga: Eclipse in 2011. Jackie Chan has won the Best Fight honor once from four nominations. Jet Li and Chris Tucker have each received three nominations, and Brad Pitt, Hugh Jackman, Hayden Christensen, and Ewan McGregor have each been nominated twice.

== Winners and nominees ==
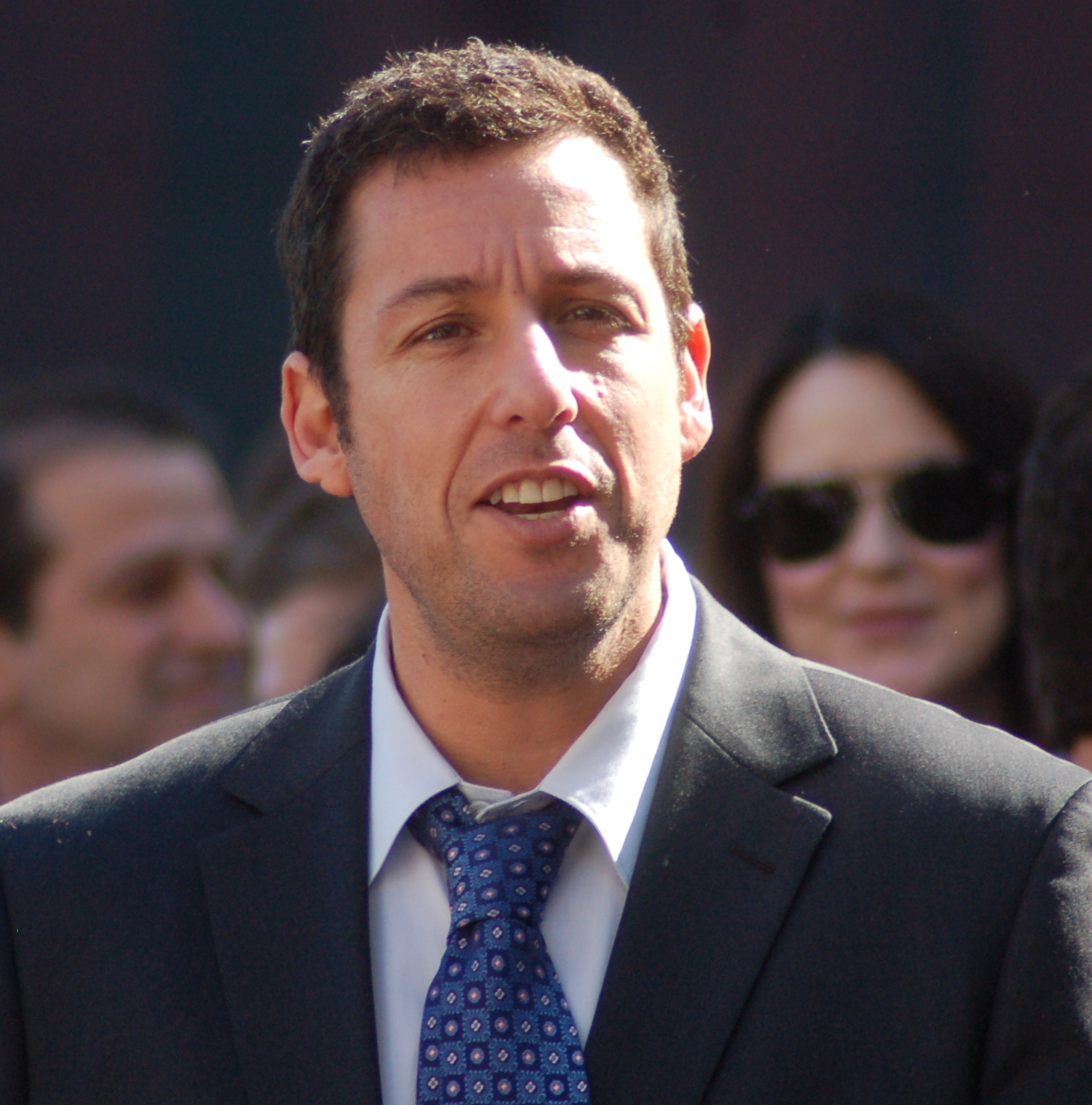
The first winner of this award, Adam Sandler for his fight with Bob Barker in Happy Gilmore, 1996

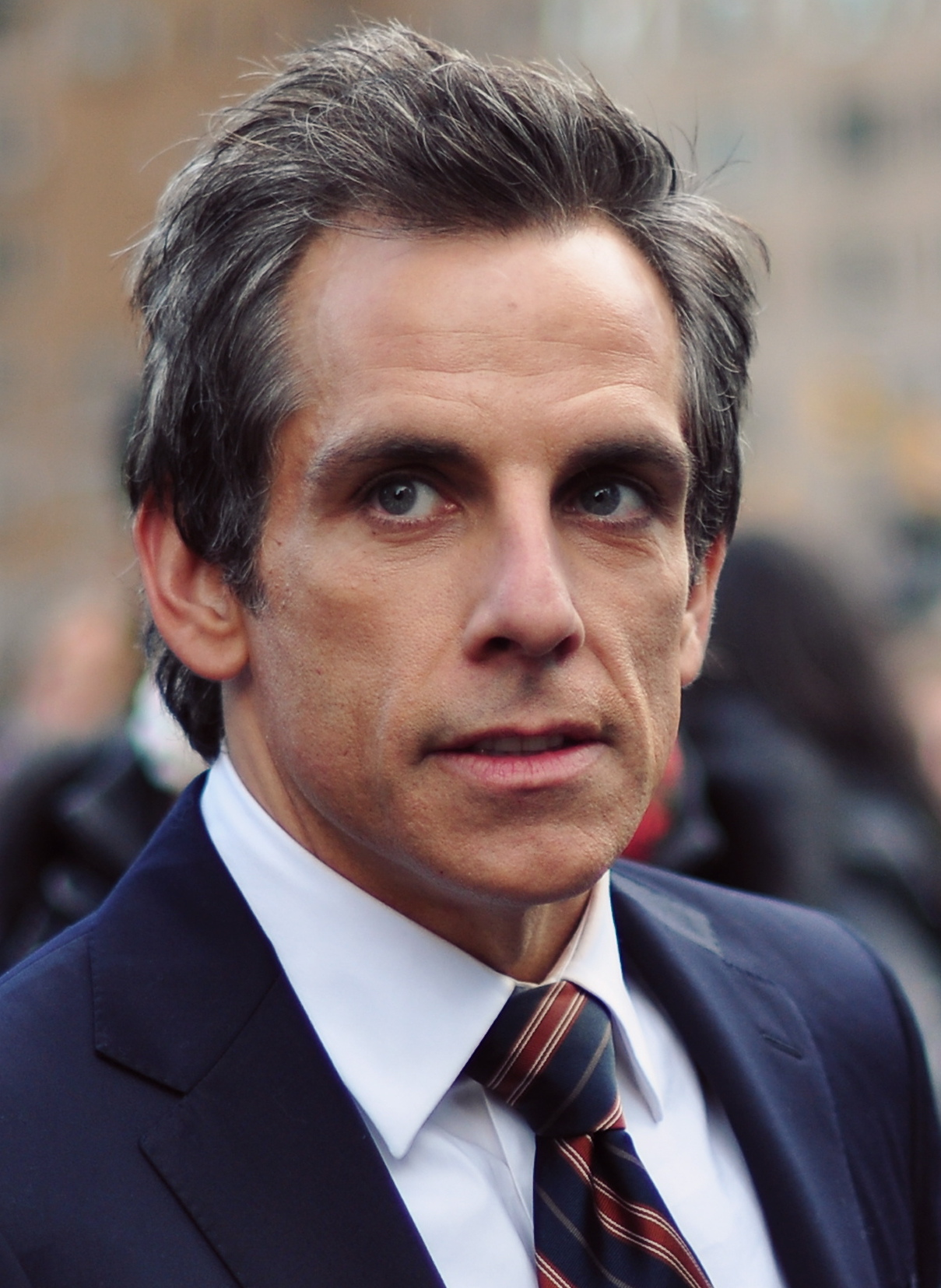
1999 winner Ben Stiller

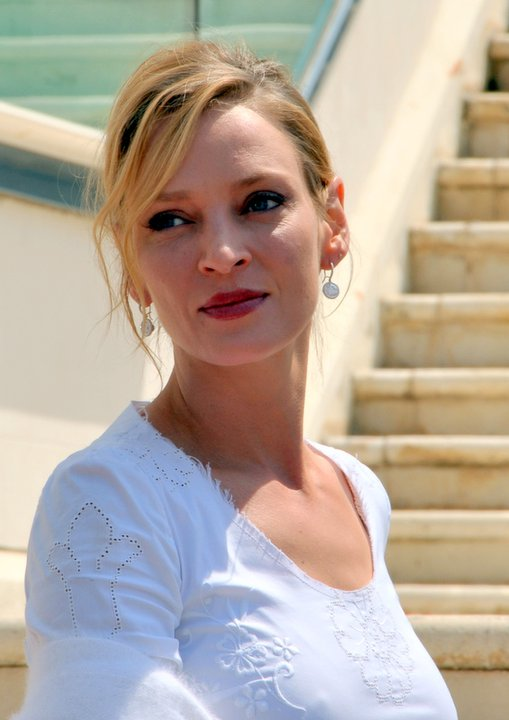
2004 and 2005 winner Uma Thurman

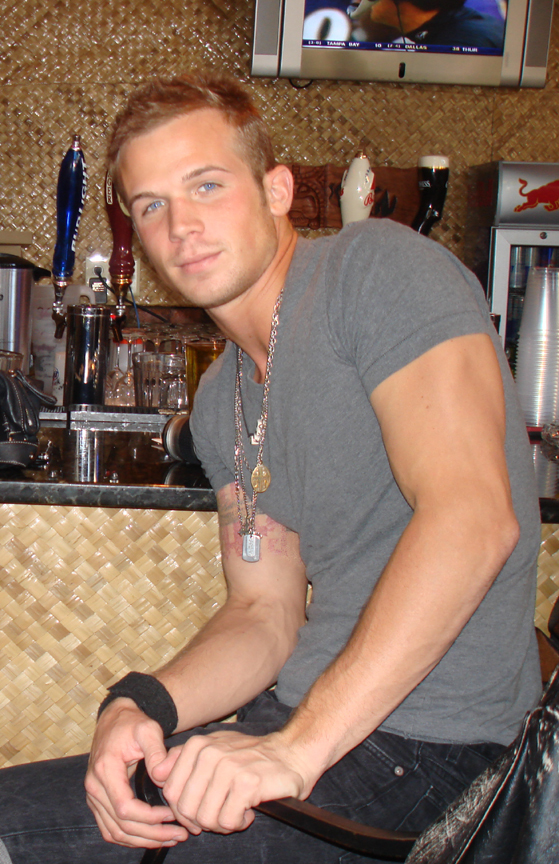
2008 and 2009 winner Cam Gigandet

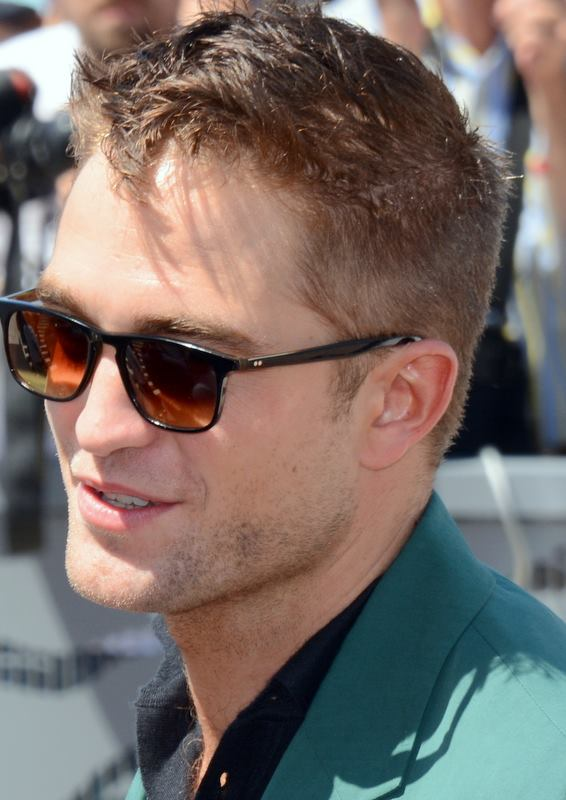
2009 and 2011 winner Robert Pattinson

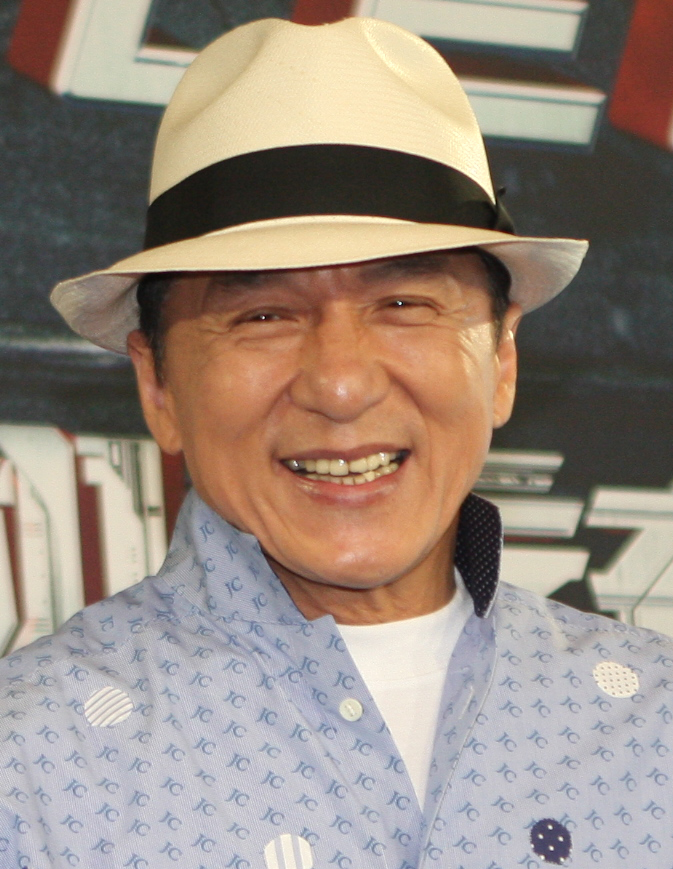
2002 winner Jackie Chan

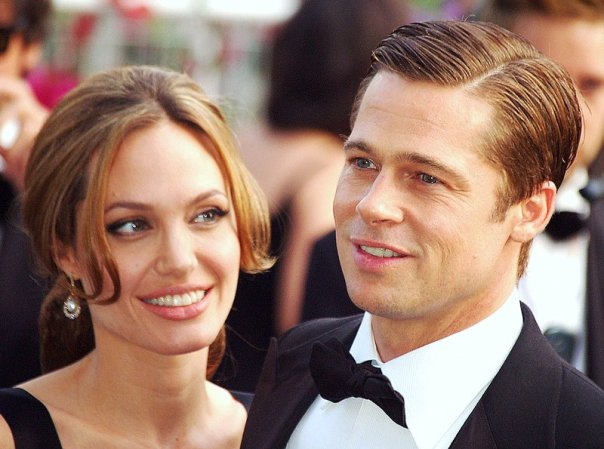
The fight between Angelina Jolie (left) and Brad Pitt in Mr. & Mrs. Smith won the 2006 award.

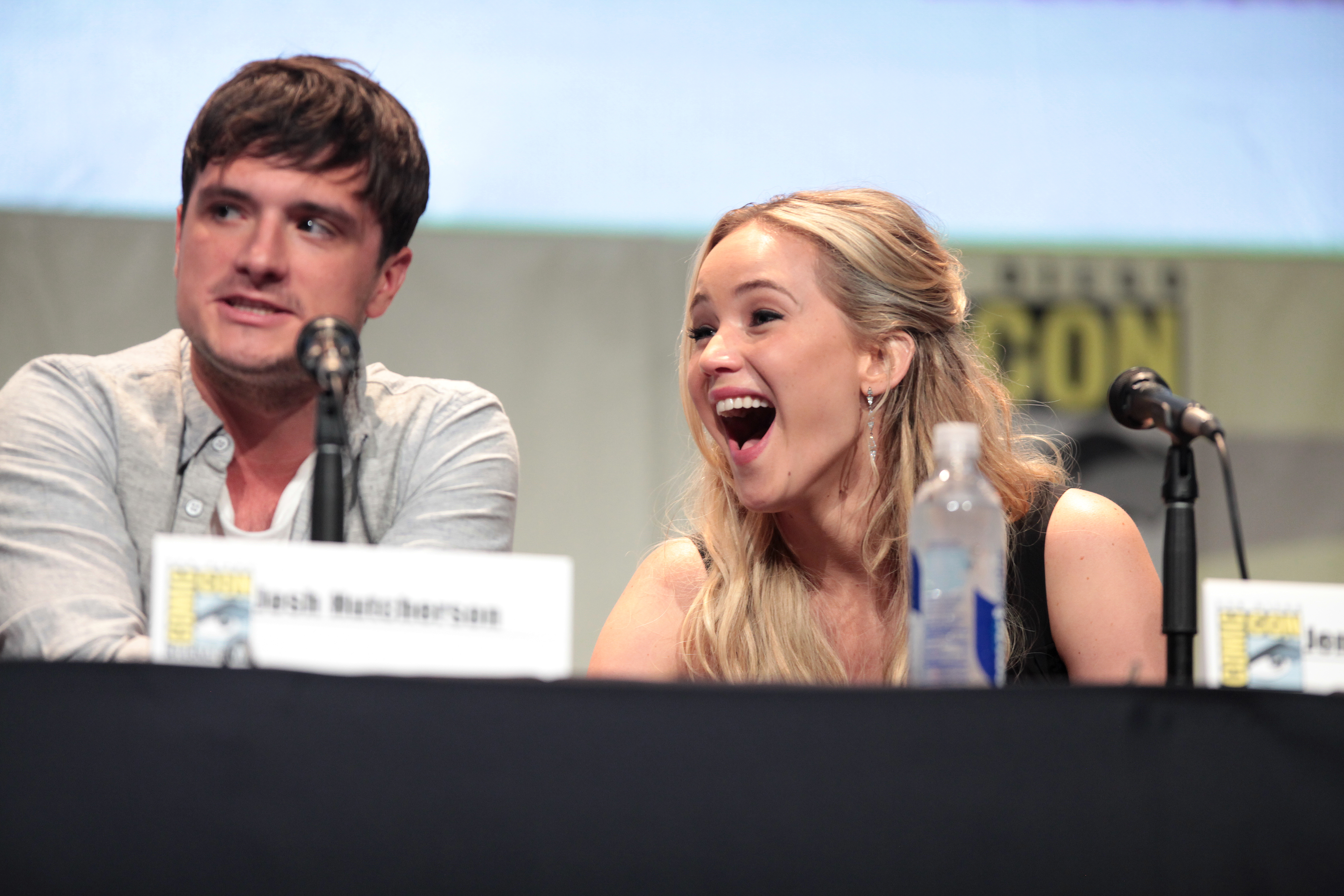
2012 winners Josh Hutcherson and Jennifer Lawrence in The Hunger Games

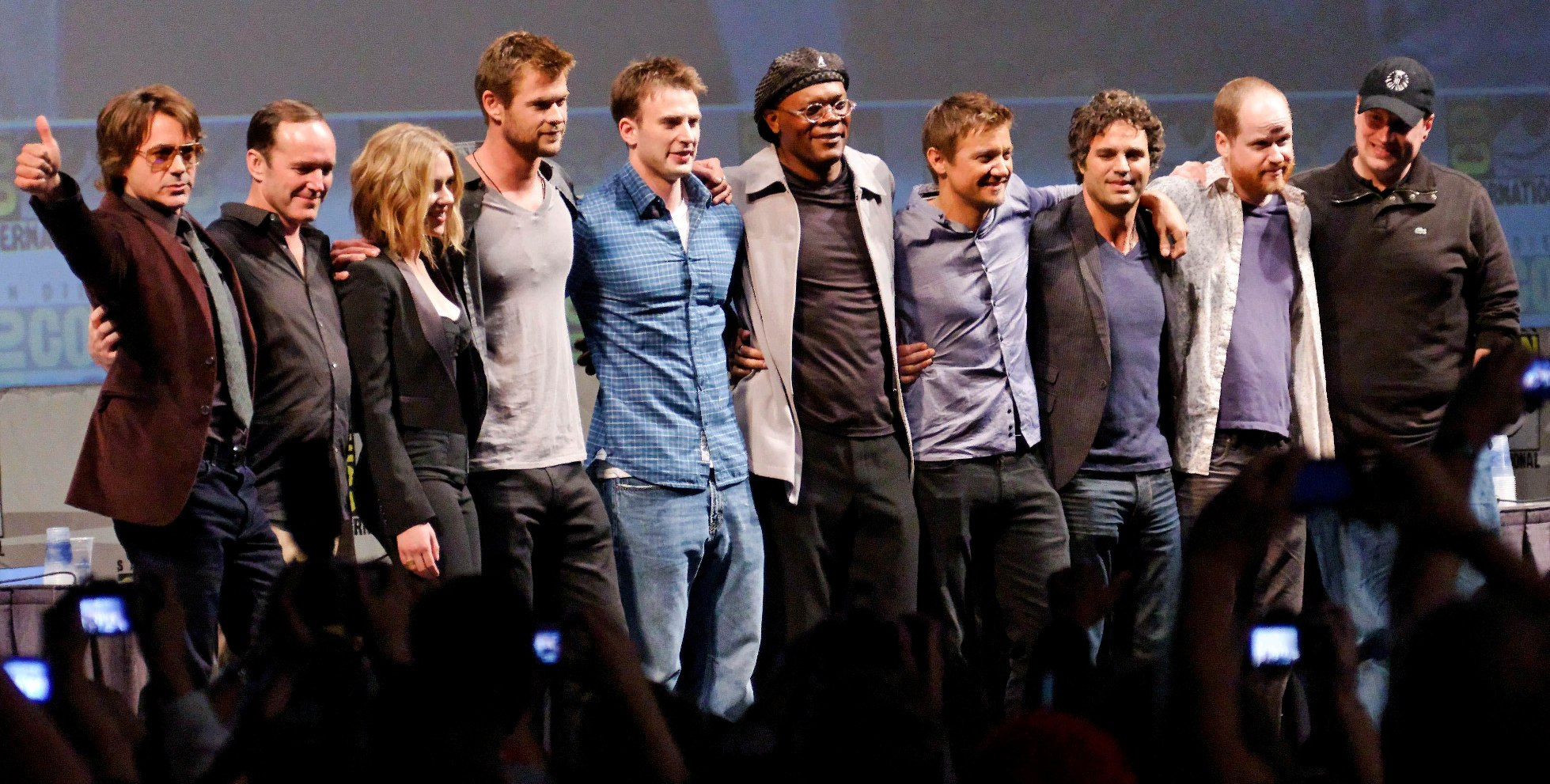
2013 winners Chris Hemsworth, Chris Evans, Mark Ruffalo, Scarlett Johansson, Jeremy Renner, Tom Hiddleston and Robert Downey Jr. in The Avengers

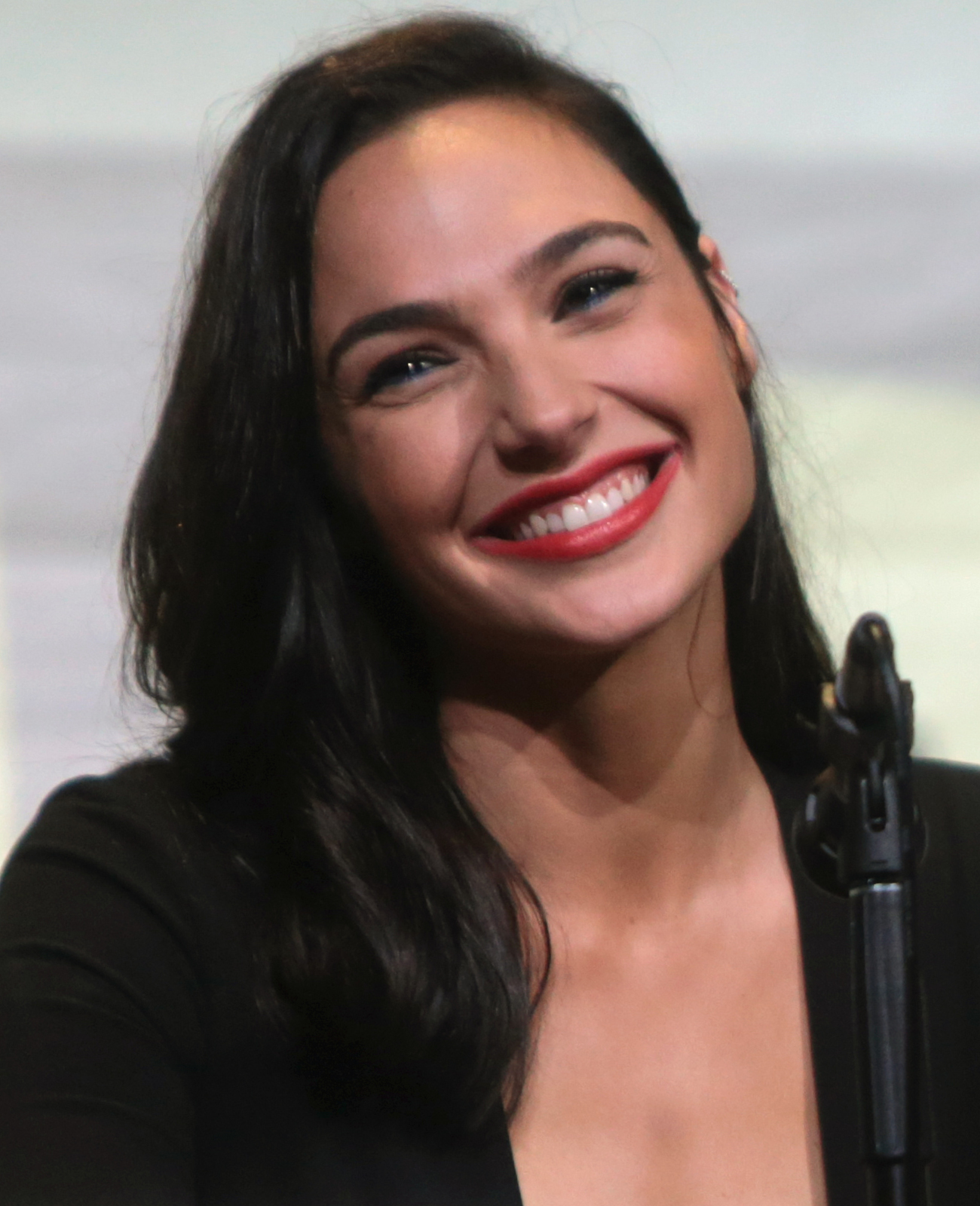
2018 winner Gal Gadot

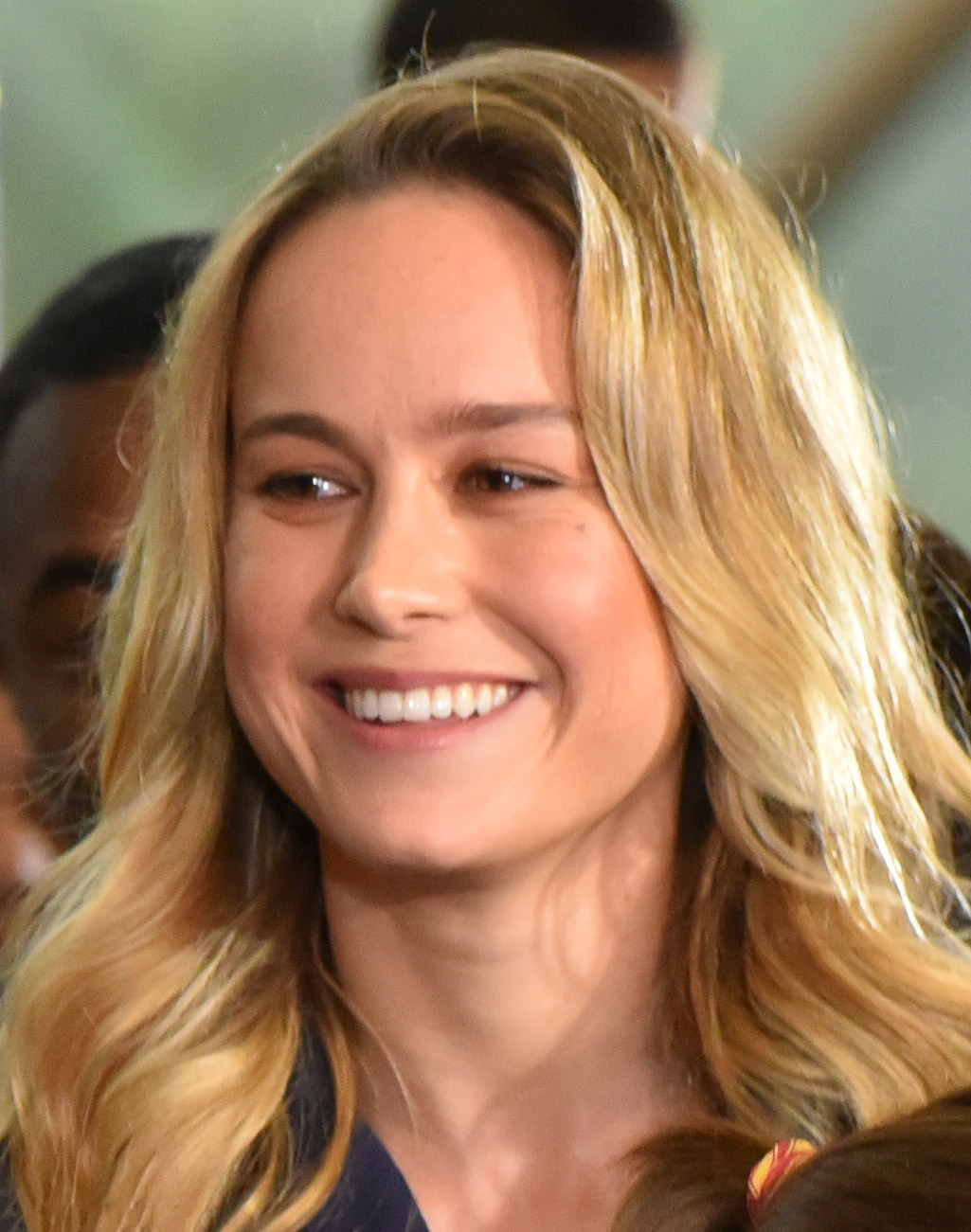
2019 winner Brie Larson

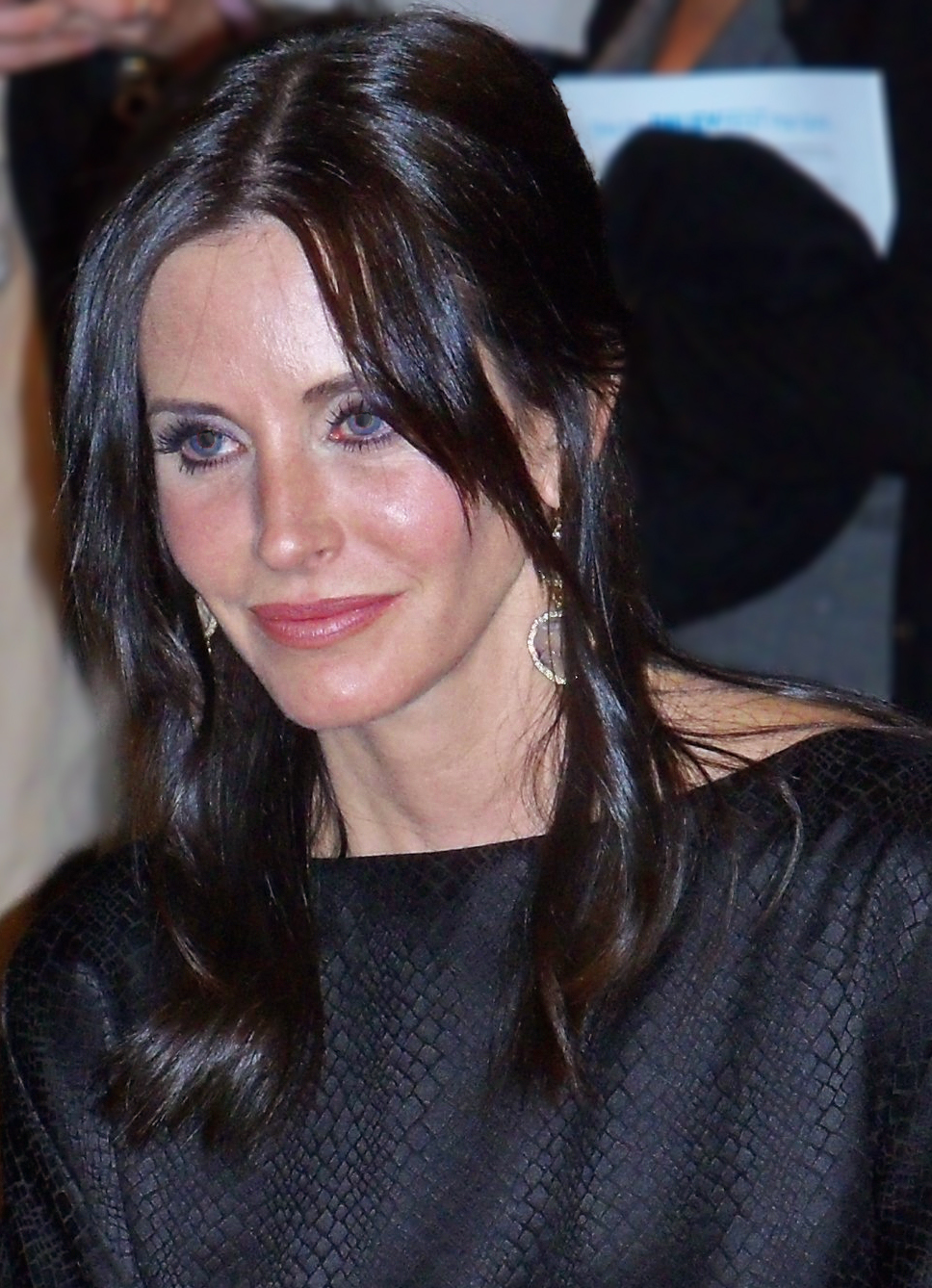
2023 winner Courteney Cox for a fight with Ghostface in Scream VI

| Year | Winner | Film | Other nominees | Ref. |
|---|---|---|---|---|
| 1996 | Adam Sandler vs. Bob Barker | Happy Gilmore | John Travolta vs. Christian Slater – Broken Arrow; Pierce Brosnan vs. Famke Janssen – GoldenEye; Jackie Chan vs. Bad Guys – Rumble in the Bronx | |
| 1997 | Fairuza Balk vs. Robin Tunney | The Craft | Matthew Broderick vs. Jim Carrey – The Cable Guy; Jim Brown vs. a Martian– Mars Attacks!; Jackie Chan vs. Henchmen – Jackie Chan's First Strike; Pamela Anderson Lee vs. Bad Guy – Barb Wire | |
| 1998 | Will Smith vs. the Edgar Bug | Men in Black | Harrison Ford vs. Gary Oldman – Air Force One; Milla Jovovich vs. Aliens – The Fifth Element; Demi Moore vs. Viggo Mortensen – G.I. Jane; Michelle Yeoh vs. Bad Guys – Tomorrow Never Dies | |
| 1999 | Ben Stiller vs. Puffy the Dog | There's Something About Mary | Wesley Snipes vs. Vampires – Blade; Antonio Banderas vs. Catherine Zeta-Jones – The Mask of Zorro; Jackie Chan and Chris Tucker vs. Chinese Gang – Rush Hour | |
| 2000 | Keanu Reeves vs. Laurence Fishburne | The Matrix | Mike Myers vs. Verne Troyer – Austin Powers: The Spy Who Shagged Me; Liam Neeson and Ewan McGregor vs. Ray Park – Star Wars: Episode I – The Phantom Menace; Edward Norton vs. Himself – Fight Club | |
| 2001 | Ziyi Zhang vs. Entire bar | Crouching Tiger, Hidden Dragon | Drew Barrymore vs. Attackers – Charlie's Angels; Russell Crowe vs. Sven-Ole Thorsen and Tiger – Gladiator; Jet Li vs. Attackers – Romeo Must Die | |
| 2002 | Jackie Chan and Chris Tucker vs. Hong Kong gang | Rush Hour 2 | Angelina Jolie vs. Robot – Lara Croft: Tomb Raider; Christopher Lee vs. Ian McKellen – The Lord of the Rings: The Fellowship of the Ring; Jet Li vs. Himself – The One | |
| 2003 | Yoda vs. Christopher Lee | Star Wars: Episode II – Attack of the Clones | Jet Li vs. Ultimate Fighters – Cradle 2 the Grave; Tobey Maguire vs. Willem Dafoe- Spider-Man; Johnny Knoxville vs. Butterbean – Jackass: The Movie; Fann Wong vs. Palace Guards – Shanghai Knights | |
| 2004 | Uma Thurman vs. Chiaki Kuriyama | Kill Bill: Volume 1 | Hugh Jackman vs. Kelly Hu – X2: X-Men United; Keanu Reeves vs. Hugo Weaving – The Matrix Reloaded; The Rock vs. Ernie Reyes Jr. and Kontiki Rebels – The Rundown; Queen Latifah vs. Missi Pyle – Bringing Down the House | |
| 2005 | Uma Thurman vs. Daryl Hannah | Kill Bill: Volume 2 | Battle of the News Teams – Anchorman: The Legend of Ron Burgundy; Brad Pitt vs. Eric Bana – Troy; Zhang Ziyi vs. Emperor's Guards – House of Flying Daggers | |
| 2006 | Angelina Jolie vs. Brad Pitt | Mr. & Mrs. Smith | Kong vs. Planes – King Kong; Stephen Chow vs. The Axe Gang – Kung Fu Hustle; Ewan McGregor vs. Hayden Christensen – Star Wars: Episode III – Revenge of the Sith | |
| 2007 | Gerard Butler vs. Robert Maillet | 300 | Sacha Baron Cohen vs. Ken Davitian – Borat: Cultural Learnings of America for Make Benefit Glorious Nation of Kazakhstan; Jack Black and Héctor Jiménez vs. Los Duendos – Nacho Libre; Will Ferrell vs. Jon Heder – Blades of Glory; Uma Thurman vs. Anna Faris – My Super Ex-Girlfriend | |
| 2008 | Sean Faris vs. Cam Gigandet | Never Back Down | Alien vs. Predator – Aliens vs. Predator: Requiem; Hayden Christensen vs. Jamie Bell – Jumper; Matt Damon vs. Joey Ansah – The Bourne Ultimatum; Tobey Maguire vs. James Franco – Spider-Man 3; Chris Tucker and Jackie Chan vs. Sun Mingming – Rush Hour 3 | |
| 2009 | Robert Pattinson vs. Cam Gigandet | Twilight | Anne Hathaway vs. Kate Hudson – Bride Wars; Christian Bale vs. Heath Ledger – The Dark Knight; Ron Perlman vs. Luke Goss – Hellboy II: The Golden Army; Seth Rogen and James Franco vs. Danny McBride – Pineapple Express | |
| 2010 | Beyoncé Knowles vs. Ali Larter | Obsessed | Sam Worthington vs. Stephen Lang – Avatar; Logan Lerman vs. Jake Abel – Percy Jackson & the Olympians: The Lightning Thief; Robert Downey Jr. vs. Mark Strong – Sherlock Holmes; Hugh Jackman and Liev Schreiber vs. Ryan Reynolds – X-Men Origins: Wolverine | |
| 2011 | Robert Pattinson vs. Bryce Dallas Howard and Xavier Samuel | The Twilight Saga: Eclipse | Amy Adams vs. The Sisters – The Fighter; Chloë Grace Moretz vs. Mark Strong – Kick-Ass; Daniel Radcliffe, Emma Watson and Rupert Grint vs. Arben Bajraktaraj and Rod Hunt – Harry Potter and the Deathly Hallows – Part 1; Joseph Gordon-Levitt vs. Hallway Attacker – Inception | |
| 2012 | Jennifer Lawrence and Josh Hutcherson vs. Alexander Ludwig | The Hunger Games | Daniel Radcliffe vs. Ralph Fiennes — Harry Potter and the Deathly Hallows – Part 2; Tom Cruise vs. Michael Nyqvist — Mission: Impossible – Ghost Protocol; Channing Tatum and Jonah Hill vs. Kid gang — 21 Jump Street; Joel Edgerton vs. Tom Hardy — Warrior | |
| 2013 | Robert Downey Jr., Chris Evans, Mark Ruffalo, Chris Hemsworth, Scarlett Johansson and Jeremy Renner vs. Tom Hiddleston | The Avengers | Christian Bale vs. Tom Hardy — The Dark Knight Rises; Jamie Foxx vs. Candieland Henchmen — Django Unchained; Daniel Craig vs. Ola Rapace — Skyfall; Mark Wahlberg vs. Seth MacFarlane — Ted | |
| 2014 | Orlando Bloom & Evangeline Lilly vs. Orcs | The Hobbit: The Desolation of Smaug | Jason Bateman vs. Melissa McCarthy – Identity Thief; Jennifer Lawrence, Josh Hutcherson, & Sam Claflin vs. Mutant Monkeys – The Hunger Games: Catching Fire; Jonah Hill vs. James Franco & Seth Rogen – This Is the End; Simon Pegg, Nick Frost, Paddy Considine, Martin Freeman, & Eddie Marsan vs. Android – The World's End; The Cast of Anchorman 2: The Legend Continues (Will Ferrell, Paul Rudd, Steve Carell and David Koechner) vs. Other Newscasters | |
| 2015 | Dylan O'Brien vs. Will Poulter | The Maze Runner | Chris Evans vs. Sebastian Stan – Captain America: The Winter Soldier; Edward Norton vs. Michael Keaton – Birdman; Jonah Hill vs. Jillian Bell – 22 Jump Street; Seth Rogen vs. Zac Efron – Neighbors | |
| 2016 | Ryan Reynolds vs. Ed Skrein | Deadpool | Leonardo DiCaprio vs. The Bear – The Revenant; Charlize Theron vs. Tom Hardy – Mad Max: Fury Road; Robert Downey Jr. vs. Mark Ruffalo – Avengers: Age of Ultron; Daisy Ridley vs. Adam Driver – Star Wars: The Force Awakens; Melissa McCarthy vs. Nargis Fakhri – Spy | |
| 2018 | Gal Gadot vs. German Soldiers | Wonder Woman | Charlize Theron vs. Daniel Hargrave and Greg Rementer – Atomic Blonde; Danai Gurira, Scarlett Johansson and Elizabeth Olsen vs. Carrie Coon – Avengers: Infinity War; Chadwick Boseman vs. Winston Duke – Black Panther; Chris Hemsworth vs. Mark Ruffalo – Thor: Ragnarok | |
| 2019 | Brie Larson vs. Gemma Chan | Captain Marvel | Josh Brolin vs. Chris Evans – Avengers: Endgame; Maisie Williams vs. White Walkers – Game of Thrones; Ruth Bader Ginsburg vs. Inequality – RBG; Becky Lynch vs. Ronda Rousey vs. Charlotte Flair – WrestleMania 35 | |
| 2021 | Elizabeth Olsen vs. Kathryn Hahn | Scripted | | |
| 2021 | Elizabeth Olsen vs. Kathryn Hahn | WandaVision | Final Funhouse Fight - Birds of Prey; Finale House Fight - Cobra Kai; Starlight, Queen Maeve, Kimiko vs. Stormfront: - The Boys; Final Fight vs. Steppenwolf - Zack Snyder's Justice League | |
| 2021 | Kourtney Kardashian vs. Kim Kardashian | Unscripted | | |
| 2021 | Kourtney Kardashian vs. Kim Kardashian | Keeping Up With The Kardashians | Chrishell Stause vs. Christine Quinn - Selling Sunset; Jackie Goldschneider vs. Teresa Giudice - The Real Housewives of New Jersey; Kandy Muse vs. Tamisha Iman - RuPaul's Drag Race: Untucked; Law Roach vs. Dominique Jackson - Legendary | |
| 2022 | Sydney Sweeney vs. Alexa Demie | Scripted | | |
| 2022 | Sydney Sweeney vs. Alexa Demie | Euphoria | Black Widow vs. Widows – Black Widow; Guy vs. Dude – Free Guy; Shang-Chi vs. Razor Fist – Shang-Chi and the Legend of the Ten Rings; Spider-Men vs. Multiverse Villains – Spider-Man: No Way Home | |
| 2022 | Bosco vs. Lady Camden | Unscripted | | |
| 2022 | Bosco vs. Lady Camden | RuPaul's Drag Race | Candiace Dillard Bassett vs. Mia Thornton – Salad toss fight – The Real Housewives of Potomac; Margaret Josephs vs. Teresa Giudice – The Real Housewives of New Jersey; Danielle Olivera vs. Ciara Miller vs. Lindsay Hubbard – Summer House; Christine Quinn vs. Chrishell Stause – Selling Sunset | |
| 2023 | Courteney Cox vs. Ghostface | Scream VI | Brad Pitt vs. Bad Bunny – Bullet Train; Jamie Campbell Bower vs. Millie Bobby Brown – Stranger Things; Keanu Reeves vs. Everyone – John Wick 4; Escape from Narkina 5 – Andor | |
