= Rush Hour (American TV series) =

American police comedy TV series

- Genre: Police procedural; Comedy drama; Action; Mystery; Crime
- Based on: Rush Hour by Ross LaManna
- Developed by: Bill Lawrence; Blake McCormick
- Starring: Justin Hires; Jon Foo; Aimee Garcia; Page Kennedy; Wendie Malick
- Composers: Waz-Jackson & Al Sgro
- Country of origin: United States
- Original language: English
- No. of seasons: 1
- No. of episodes: 13

Production
- Executive producers: Toby Emmerich; Arthur M. Sarkissian; Brett Ratner; Jeff Ingold; Blake McCormick; Bill Lawrence; Steve Franks
- Producers: Trey Callaway; Steven Fielder; Andrew Cholerton; Carlos Jacott; Brian Chamberlayne
- Production locations: Universal City, California, U.S.
- Cinematography: David Connell; Christian Sebaldt; Marshall Adams
- Editors: Roger Bondelli; Noel Rogers; Elisa Cohen; Mike Banas
- Camera setup: Single-camera
- Running time: 42 minutes
- Production companies: Doozer; RatPac Television; New Line Cinema; Warner Bros. Television

Original release
- Network: CBS
- Release: March 31 – August 20, 2016

Rush Hour is an American police procedural comedy-drama television series developed by Bill Lawrence and Blake McCormick that is based on the film of the same name. The series was produced by Doozer, RatPac Television, New Line Cinema and Warner Bros. Television. Similar to the films, the series follows Detective Carter, a radical LAPD detective, and Detective Lee, a by-the-book detective from Hong Kong, as they are forced into an unlikely partnership. CBS placed a series order on May 8, 2015. The show premiered on March 31, 2016.

On May 16, 2016, CBS cancelled the show after one season. On May 26, 2016, CBS removed the show from its schedule; however, they later announced the show would return on July 23, 2016, to burn off the remaining episodes. The series finale aired on August 20, 2016.

== Cast ==
=== Main ===
- Justin Hires as Detective James Steven Carter, a reckless LAPD detective who is partnered with a serious detective from Hong Kong, Detective Lee. He is based on the character that Chris Tucker portrayed in the Rush Hour franchise.
- Jon Foo as Detective Jonathan Lee, a strict detective from Hong Kong who is partnered with a brash detective from the LAPD, Detective Carter. He is based on the character that Jackie Chan portrayed in the Rush Hour franchise. Unlike in the films, Lee does not carry a firearm on the job, due to being haunted by having to kill someone with one in Hong Kong sometime before the series.
- Aimee Garcia as Sergeant Didi Diaz, Carter's former partner. After her son Derrick was born, she decided to work from her desk instead of on the streets. To avoid her from being humiliated from the other cops, Carter took the heat and let them believe that he dumped her as a partner.
- Page Kennedy as Gerald Page, a low life criminal and Carter's cousin who is secretly his and Lee's informant to help them solve cases. When he was 16, he and Carter robbed a man outside a liquor store with an unloaded BB gun. When the cops arrived, he told Carter to run, believing that his cousin had more potential in life than he ever would.
- Wendie Malick as Captain Lindsay Cole, Carter's and Lee's no nonsense captain. She gets annoyed with Carter's wild behavior when he's on a case, but also recognizes that he's a great detective. She finds Detective Lee extremely attractive.

=== Recurring ===
- Jessika Van as MSS Agent Kim Lee, a former Hong Kong police officer and Lee's younger sister. When she first arrived in Los Angeles, she seemingly joined the Quantou, a dangerous Chinese crime organization, believing that her big brother wasn't letting her live up to her full potential as a cop. In "Assault on Precinct 7", she is revealed to be an MSS agent undercover in the organization, but opts to keep this hidden from Lee to protect him. In the series finale, she is reassigned following the collapse of the Quantou.
- Kirk Fox as Detective Don Ovan, a detective who works with Carter and Lee. He and Carter have a strong dislike for each other.
- Steele Gagnon as Derrick, Didi's young son.
- Julianna Guill as Dr. Alice Rosenberger, the medical examiner for the LAPD. She has a huge crush on Lee.
- Diedrich Bader as CIA Agent Westhusing, part of a task force combatting the Quantou.
- Lyman Chen as MSS agent Joseph Yun, Kim's superior. He is outed as corrupt and working for the Quantou after selling Kim out to them in the final episode, and arrested by Carter and Lee.
- James Hong as the Dragon of the Quantou, and the series' main antagonist. He is willing to do anything to take and retain power over Los Angeles, even killing his own son, Zhou Tu. He is killed in the finale by Carter, Lee, and Kim after admitting to having Lee and Kim's parents killed in a hit disguised as a car accident.
- Byron Mann as Fong, the Dragon's loyal right-hand man.

=== Notable guest stars ===
- Robyn Lively as FBI Agent Myers
- Lewis Tan as Cheng
- Doug Savant as D.A. Ginardi
- Vernee Watson as "Grandma", Carter's and Gerald's foster mother.
- Janel Parrish as Nina

== Episodes ==
No.	Title	Directed by	Written by	Original release date	Prod. code	US viewers (millions)
1	"Pilot"	Jon Turteltaub	Teleplay by : Bill Lawrence & Blake McCormick and Jim Kouf and Ross LaManna; Story by : Ross LaManna	March 31, 2016	276098	5.06
When the Quantou organization from Hong Kong steal valuable terracotta statues from a cargo plane in Los Angeles, Detective Lee, tasked with recovering them travels to Los Angeles, and is partnered with Detective James Carter. Their investigation leads them to a noodle restaurant in Chinatown used by the Quantou. While there, Lee encounters his sister Kim who he believed was killed along with the officers guarding the statues, and learns she's working with the Quantou. Because of their actions, Carter is suspended by Captain Lindsay Cole, and Lee is ordered to return to Hong Kong. Carter convinces Lee to continue the investigation, which leads them to an empty mall containing the statues. Inside the mall, Lee encounters his sister Kim, and learns that Thomas was responsible for the Quantou stealing the statues. With the statues recovered, Carter's suspension is lifted, and Lee reveals to him that he had transferred to the LAPD office.
2	"Two Days or the Number of Hours Within that Timeframe"	Peter Weller	Blake McCormick	April 7, 2016	4X6403	4.81
Detective Carter and Detective Lee investigate a series of homicides committed by a gang during a home invasion. They are called to arrest a drug dealer who turns out to be Carters cousin Gerald, and arrest him. When they notice he's wearing a stolen Rolex from one of the homes, Carter suggests a deal to Captain Cole that Gerald helps them in exchange for avoiding prison, but she refuses. Carter decides to break him out anyway, and he leads them across the city. But when the investigation leads them nowhere, Gerald handcuffs Carter to a handrail and flees. They realize that the gang responsible for the homicides had worked on the houses previously when Lee remembers the similar art styles used in the homes, which leads them to Nick Wright. After arresting Nick, Carter is called back to the station by Captain Cole and is told that as punishment for his actions he can take no acclaim for the arrest, and then congratulates Lee. Gerald is later released from custody.
3	"Captain Cole's Playlist"	Sylvain White	Brian Chamberlayne & Steve Franks	April 14, 2016	4X6410	4.26
Lee and Carter investigate the disappearance and apparent murder of an Assistant D.A. and discover that there may be a witness to the crime. The search for the said witness proves difficult when it's discovered that a criminal who has long-avoid prosecution may be the murderer and the one looking to silence the witness.
4	"LA Real Estate Boom"	Jimmy Muro	Cindy Fang	April 21, 2016	4X6407	4.65
Detective Carter and Detective Lee investigate a series of bombings committed by a man targeting people connected to a strip club that was demolished. They learn that the man responsible worked at a bakery that was lost during the demolition, and that the man had previously attempted to get the building classed as a heritage site, but failed. Meanwhile Gerald, after learning that Lee is looking for a new place to stay, offers his services and takes him to Didi's house. Gerald tells Lee that the place is perfect for him as he had once said that it had felt like home to him. Lee is reluctant to accept the offer, but is reassured by Didi that he's welcome to stay in the spare room.
5	"Assault on Precinct 7"	John Putch	Trey Callaway	April 28, 2016	4X6409	4.32
Detective Lee's sister Kim visits him at Didi's home and gives him a tip regarding trafficked women being held by the Quantou. The investigation leads to one of the lead enforcers of the organization, who is also the head's son, whom they manage to capture. But before they can get him to talk, a faction of Quantou members infiltrate the L.A.P.D. to supposedly break him out, Kim being one of them. Although the detectives ultimately manage to take down the Quantou members, they are unable to prevent the son from being killed in his interrogation room. They are able, however, to locate and free the trafficked women. At the end, Kim is revealed to be an MSS Agent working undercover in the Quantou for the Chinese Ministry State of Security her superior MSS Agent Joseph Yun. They, along with FBI Agent Myers & CIA Agent Westhusing, meet with Captain Cole. Agent Lee asks Captain Cole to not tell her brother about her assignment for the time being.
6	"Welcome Back, Carter"	Steve Boyum	Brittany Hilgers & Krystal Houghton-Ziv	May 5, 2016	4X6412	4.56
Lee and Carter pose as faculty at a prestigious high school to investigate the death of a student, later discovered to be an undercover police officer investigating illegal drug activity.
7	"Badass Cop"	Steve Boyum	Steve Franks	May 12, 2016	4X6402	4.53
Carter and Lee are present for a seemingly unsuccessful armored van robbery involving a motor cycle group, and launch an investigation. Carter becomes excited when someone publishes a video of the crime, featuring him, labelled "badass cop", but is horrified to realize that the video was about Lee. Lee suspects that the robbery was the work of the Quantou, but Carter and Didi discover that it was performed by a Ukrainian gang.
8	"Wind Beneath My Wingman"	Maja Vrvilo	Krystal Houghton Ziv	May 19, 2016	4X6406	4.13
Lee and Carter escort a witness to whom Carter is attracted from a safehouse to the courtroom, but are attacked by a pair of assassins. It is discovered that Nina, the witness, was having an affair with her boss, who she is now testifying against. She fears this will damage her credibility as a witness, so she escapes police custody to obtain more evidence.
9	"Prisoner of Love"	John Badham	Trey Callaway	July 23, 2016	4X6405	1.83
Lee and Carter track an escaped prisoner from Boston who appears to be looking for his family who are in witness protection, but soon discovers that not all is as it seems in this case.
10	"Knock, Knock... House Creeping!"	James Roday	Carlos Jacott	July 30, 2016	4X6408	2.03
While investigating a young girl's disappearance from an exclusive hotel, Lee and Carter find that it might be connected to the doings of a long-assumed dead serial killer who has powerful and traumatic ties to Captain Cole's past as a detective.
11	"O Hostage! My Hostage!"	Steve Boyum	Brian Chamberlayne	August 6, 2016	4X6404	1.67
Carter & Lee find themselves handling a hostage situation at the L.A. Concert Hall that Captain Cole has found herself caught in the middle of, which unknown to anyone, is actually a cover for an even bigger scheme.
12	"The Dark Night"	Stephen Herek	Blake McCormick	August 13, 2016	4X6411	1.64
Carter and Lee are put on the case of a mastermind who targets and publicly humiliates prominent people with something to hide, then kills them if they don't own up. As the hunt for the mastermind goes on, a link between him and Carter is uncovered along with a long, deep-seated revenge plot against an auto company for covering up a car defect that ultimately killed the man's family and maimed him for life years prior.
13	"Familee Ties"	John Putch	Trey Callaway and Carlos Jacott	August 20, 2016	4X6413	1.62
Carter and Lee investigate a gunless, violence-less bank robbery that they are able to determine ultimately traces back to the Quantou. They soon discover that the Dragon of the Quantou is gathering the gang lords of Los Angeles to a summit in order to unite them all under his command, and learn about Kim's true status as an MSS Agent in the process. However, when she is betrayed and sold out by her corrupt superior, Agent Yun, Carter, Lee and the rest of Precinct 7 must race against time to save her and stop the summit.

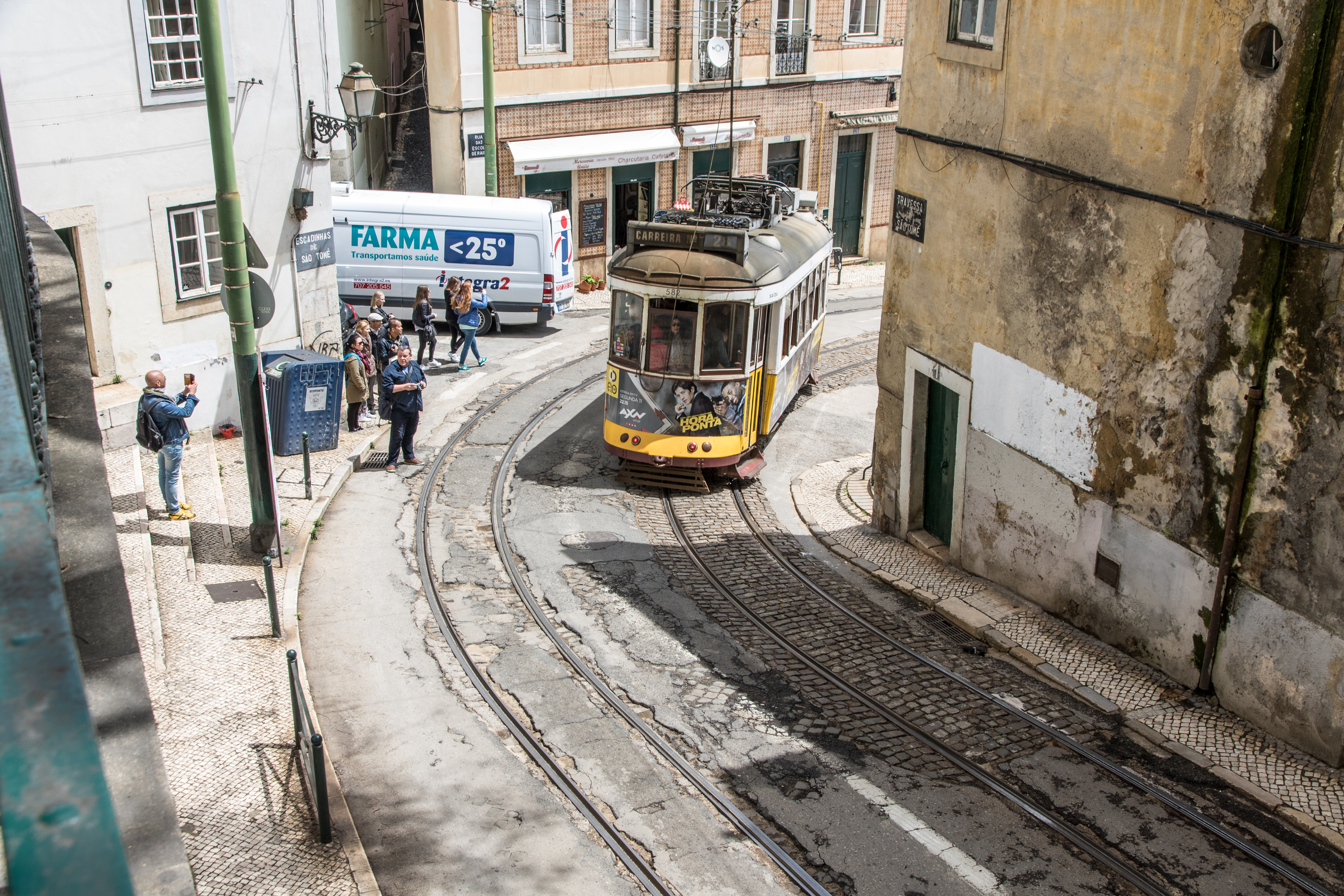
Advertisement for the AXN syndication in Portugal (Hora de Ponta) on a Lisbon tram in 2016.

== Broadcast ==
The series premiered on CBS in the United States on March 31, 2016. It aired on E4 in the United Kingdom on April 19, 2016, and the Seven Network in Australia on June 9, 2016.

== Filming locations ==
Among the locations used for filming the series were three places in the San Fernando Valley region of Los Angeles, California: Roscoe Boulevard in Canoga Park, and two locations in Studio City: Universal Inn on Ventura Boulevard, and Vista Pointe II Apartments on Aqua Vista Street.

== Reception ==
Rush Hour received generally negative reviews from critics. Rotten Tomatoes gave the show a 22% approval rating based on reviews from 23 critics. The site's critical consensus states: "Lackluster chemistry and uninspired plotting prevent Rush Hour from living up to its namesake." Metacritic gave season one of the show a score of 46 out of 100 based on 18 reviews, indicating "mixed or average reviews".

=== Ratings ===
Viewership and ratings per episode of Rush Hour
No.	Title	Air date	Rating/share (18–49)	Viewers (millions)	Ref.
1	"Pilot"	March 31, 2016	1.1/4	5.06	
2	"Two Days or the Number of Hours Within that Timeframe"	April 7, 2016	0.9/3	4.81	
3	"Captain Cole's Playlist"	April 14, 2016	0.9/3	4.26	
4	"La Real Estate Boom"	April 21, 2016	1.0/4	4.65	
5	"Assault on Precinct 7"	April 28, 2016	0.9/3	4.32	
6	"Welcome Back, Carter"	May 5, 2016	0.8/3	4.56	
7	"Badass Cop"	May 12, 2016	0.9/3	4.53	
8	"Wind Beneath My Wingman"	May 19, 2016	0.9/3	4.13	
9	"Prisoner of Love"	July 23, 2016	0.3/1	1.83	
10	"Knock, Knock...House Creeping!"	July 30, 2016	0.3/1	2.03	
11	"O Hostage! My Hostage!"	August 6, 2016	0.2/1	1.67	
12	"The Dark Night"	August 13, 2016	0.3/1	1.64	
13	"Familee Ties"	August 20, 2016	0.3/1	1.62	
