= Jay Stern =

American film producer

Jay Stern is an American film producer.

== Filmography ==
He was a producer in all films unless otherwise noted.

=== Film ===
Year	Film	Notes
1997	Love Jones	Executive producer
1997	B.A.P.S.	Executive producer
1997	Money Talks	Co-executive producer
1998	Rush Hour	Executive producer
1999	The Corruptor	Executive producer
2000	Love & Basketball	Executive producer
2001	Rush Hour 2	
2004	After the Sunset	
2007	Code Name: The Cleaner	
2007	Rush Hour 3	
2010	Mother's Day	
2011	Horrible Bosses	
2014	Horrible Bosses 2	
2015	A Walk in the Woods	Executive producer
2015	Last Knights	Executive producer
2015	Equals	
TBA	Hong Kong Phooey	

Miscellaneous crew

Year	Film	Notes
1979	Squeeze Play!	Assistant to producer

Thanks

Year	Film	Notes
2005	Santa's Slay	The producers wish to thank
