= Rush Hour (franchise) =

Series of American buddy cop films

- Directed by: Brett Ratner (1–3)
- Screenplay by: Jim Kouf (1); Ross LaManna (1); Jeff Nathanson (2–3)
- Story by: Ross LaManna (1); Jeff Nathanson (2–3)
- Based on: Characters created by Ross LaManna
- Produced by: Jay Stern; Michael Poryes; Roger Birnbaum; Robert Birnbaum; Jonathan Glickman; Arthur M. Sarkissian
- Starring: Jackie Chan; Chris Tucker
- Edited by: Mark Possy; Billy Weber; Don Zimmerman; Mark Helfrich; Robert K. Lambert
- Music by: Ira Hearshen; Nile Rodgers; Lalo Schifrin; Mark Mothersbaugh
- Distributed by: Warner Bros. Pictures; (New Line Cinema) (1–3) Paramount Pictures (4)
- Running time: 279 minutes
- Country: United States
- Language: English
- Budget: $263–305 million
- Box office: $850.8 million

The Rush Hour franchise is a series of American buddy cop action comedy films created by Ross LaManna and directed by Brett Ratner with both Jackie Chan and Chris Tucker in leading roles. All three films center around a pair of police detectives, Hong Kong Police Force (HKPF) Chief Inspector Lee (Chan) and Los Angeles Police Department (LAPD) Detective James Carter (Tucker), who go on their series of misadventures involving corrupt crime figures in Hong Kong and Los Angeles. The films incorporate elements of martial arts, humor involving fish out of water situations and east–west culture shock, and the buddy cop subgenre. The films were released theatrically from 1998 to 2007, attaining commercial success, but critical reception was mixed.

== Films ==
=== Rush Hour ===
Rush Hour was released on September 18, 1998, grossing over $240 million worldwide. Martin Lawrence was originally considered for the role of James Carter. Chris Tucker was finally chosen for the part. Director Brett Ratner, a big fan of Jackie Chan's Hong Kong movies, felt that American audiences would not be familiar with the jokes in Jackie's other movies, and deliberately re-used some of his gags. For example, the scene where Inspector Lee accidentally grabs Detective Johnson's (Elizabeth Peña) breasts is a reference to Jackie Chan's film Mr. Nice Guy (1997). Rush Hour began as a spec script written in 1995 by screenwriter/novelist Ross LaManna. The screenplay was sold by LaManna's William Morris agent Alan Gasmer to Hollywood Pictures, a division of the Walt Disney Company, with Arthur Sarkissian attached as producer. After attaching director Ratner and developing the project for more than a year with producers including Sarkissian and Roger Birnbaum, Disney Studios Chief Joe Roth put the project into turnaround, citing concerns about the $34 million budget, and Chan's appeal to American audiences at the time. Several studios were interested in acquiring the project. New Line Cinema was confident in Ratner's talents, having done Money Talks with him, so they made a hard commitment to a budget and start date for the film.

=== Rush Hour 2 ===
Rush Hour 2 was released on August 3, 2001, and grossed over $340 million worldwide, making it the most financially successful film in the series. The film received mixed reviews compared with the first film. Other than Chan and Tucker, no cast members return to reprise their roles from the first film. John Lone, Zhang Ziyi, and Roselyn Sánchez join the cast while actors Don Cheadle, Saul Rubinek, Gianni Russo, and Jeremy Piven have guest or cameo appearances. The first two Rush Hour films both begin in Hong Kong and end in a United States airport.

=== Rush Hour 3 ===
Rush Hour 3 was officially announced on May 7, 2006, and filming began on July 4, 2006. The film, set in Paris and Los Angeles, was first released on August 10, 2007, and grossed over $250 million worldwide. Academy Award-winning film director Roman Polanski co-stars as a French police official involved in Lee and Carter's (Chan and Tucker's characters) case. Tzi Ma reprises his role as Ambassador Han, Lee's boss and friend who appeared in the first installment. This film has received an M rating by the Office of Film and Literature Classification (Australia) and a PG-13 rating by the MPAA for "sequences of action violence, sexual content, nudity and language". Additionally, the film was not screened in Chinese theaters in 2007 to make way for a larger variety of foreign films, according to a business representative (the quota for imported films is 20 each year).

=== Rush Hour 4 ===
Because of the films' collective box-office success, director Brett Ratner and writer Jeff Nathanson are considering the production of a fourth installment. In the DVD audio commentary for Rush Hour 3, Brett Ratner joked that the fourth Rush Hour film could be released in 2012. Ratner and Nathanson are exploring many concepts, including the use of the motion capture technique for the possible sequel and various different film projects with Chan and Tucker. It has been reported that the fourth film may be set in Moscow.

In July 2009, in an interview, Ratner stated that he "has been in contact with a long list of stars including Danny DeVito and Jet Li for possible roles in a potential Rush Hour 4", but stressed "nothing's been okayed yet". In a short interview with Vulture in 2011, Ratner stated that the cost of making a follow-up to X-Men: The Last Stand would have cost more than X-Men: First Class and "that's why another Rush Hour 4 probably won't get made, either: It'd be too much to pay me, Chris [Tucker], and Jackie [Chan] to come back."

In August 2011, in an interview with The Breakfast Club, Tucker stated in response to the question of a fourth by saying, "Rush Hour 4? Maybe you know, because that's a different kind of movie. You got the action and the stuff like that, and they pay 20 million dollars too... I'm just joking! No, you know Jackie Chan, you know I love working with him and those type of movies you can redo them and it's different, we'll see but I don't know though. But we've got some new stuff coming, so we'll see what happens."

In July 2012, series producer Arthur M. Sarkissian stated that a fourth film was being worked on with Chan and Tucker, and stated that he would welcome Brett Ratner back as a director if he would "do it in the right way." Sarkissian expressed some dissatisfaction with the third film, and admitted he wants the potential fourth film to be grittier, and have new ideas. Sarkissian is reportedly working on choosing which out of "four or five" screenwriters he has been talking to, should work on the script.

In August 2014, Chan stated that the studio still wants to make Rush Hour 4, but that he will only participate if he can see a quality script first, stating "I don’t want to do a rubbish script just because they want to make the movie". Both Chan and Tucker met for dinner to discuss Rush Hour 4 in June 2015.

In November 2016, while promoting Billy Lynn's Long Halftime Walk, Tucker reaffirmed his optimism for a potential fourth film, stating “Yeah, we’re talking about it now doing another one, and we’re trying to get it going. I think we might be able to get one going. I love working with Jackie and I think we could do a really fun one.” In April 2017, it was reported that Indian actor Shah Rukh Khan had said yes to join the Rush Hour 4 cast. By October 2017, Chan said that the script for Rush Hour 4 has been in the works and shooting for the film will most likely start in 2018 if Tucker agrees to be in the film. He stated that he was optimistic about Tucker accepting due to his previous claims of being on board for the film.

In February 2018, Tucker confirmed the production of Rush Hour 4. He stated on ESPN's podcast, The Plug: "It's happening. This is gonna be the rush of all rushes. Jackie is ready and we want to do this so that people don't ever forget it." In February 2019, Tucker reported that the script is coming together, stating: "We're working on a few things on the script right now, so we’re trying to get into production. But we’re working on it and trying to get it going." He reiterated this in a podcast appearance in April that the fourth film was still a possibility, but that "it's not in pre-production. We're working on a few things [for] the script. Jackie wants to do it. I want to do it. The studio wants to do it." By 2018, in the wake of sexual misconduct allegations against Ratner by several actresses, Warner Bros. sources presumed that it's highly unlikely that Ratner will be directing Rush Hour 4.

In March 2019, That Hashtag Show reported that a female-led Rush Hour reboot was in development by STXfilms with Li Bingbing in the lead.

In December 2022, the fourth film was confirmed to be in development by Chan. In November 2025, Paramount Pictures was announced to release the film with Brett Ratner returning. It has been reported that U.S. President Donald Trump played a role in reviving the project.

In late April 2026, it was reported that Rush Hour 4 has been delayed due to salary disputes, as Chris Tucker and Jackie Chan were only offered $8 million compared to the larger $20 million salary they received in Rush Hour 3. Filming was supposed to take place in China, Saudi Arabia, and Africa, before the film was reportedly pushed back to September 2026 at the earliest.

== Television series ==
A TV series based on the premise of the film series aired from March to August 2016, with Jon Foo as Chief Inspector Lee and Justin Hires as James Carter. The films' original director Brett Ratner signed on as the show's executive producer, along with Rush Hour producers Arthur M. Sarkissian, Jeff Ingold, and Jon Turteltaub. Turtletaub also directed the pilot episode with Bill Lawrence penning the series alongside Blake McCormick. James Lew, who worked on the stunts for all three films, was a stunt coordinator for the series. It was announced that Jon Foo and Justin Hires would star as Detectives Lee and Carter for the CBS series, along with Aimee Garcia and Jessika Van in regular roles. The series was cancelled after one season.

== Characters ==
List indicators

This section includes characters who will appear or have appeared in notable roles.

- An empty grey cell indicates the character was not in the film, or that the character's official presence has not yet been confirmed.
- ^{E} indicates an appearance not included in the theatrical cut.
- ^{U} indicates an uncredited appearance.

Character	Films			Television series
Character	Rush Hour	Rush Hour 2	Rush Hour 3	Rush Hour
Character	1998	2001	2007	2016
Chief Inspector Lee	Jackie Chan	Jackie Chan	Jackie Chan	Jon Foo
Detective James Carter	Chris Tucker	Chris Tucker	Chris Tucker	Justin Hires
Consul / Ambassador Solon Han	Tzi Ma		Tzi Ma	
Soo Yung Han	Julia Hsu		Zhang Jingchu	
Thomas Griffin Juntao	Tom Wilkinson			Henry Ian Cusick (Note: Credited in pilot episode as "Thomas".)
Detective Tania Johnson	Elizabeth Peña			
Sang	Ken Leung			
FBI Agent Warren Russ	Mark Rolston			
FBI Agent Dan Whitney	Rex Linn			
Captain William Diel	Philip Baker Hall	Philip Baker Hall^{E}	Philip Baker Hall^{U}	
Ricky Tan		John Lone		
Isabella Molina		Roselyn Sánchez	Roselyn Sánchez^{E}	
Hu Li		Zhang Ziyi		
Steven Reign		Alan King		
Kenji			Hiroyuki Sanada	
Geneviève			Noémie Lenoir	
George			Yvan Attal	
Jasmine The Dragon Lady			Youki Kudoh	
Varden Reynard			Max von Sydow	
Sergeant Didi Diaz				Aimee Garcia
Captain Lindsay Cole				Wendie Malick
Gerald				Page Kennedy
Kim Lee				Jessika Van
Donovan				Kirk Fox

== Reception ==
=== Box office performance ===
Film	Release date	Box office gross			Box office ranking		Budget	References
Film	Release date	North America	Other territories	Worldwide	All time North America	All time worldwide	Budget	References
Rush Hour	September 18, 1998	$141,186,864	$104,113,136	$245,300,000	#312	#455	$33–35 million	
Rush Hour 2	August 3, 2001	$226,164,286	$121,261,546	$347,425,832	#114 #165^{(A)}	#270	$90 million	
Rush Hour 3	August 10, 2007	$140,125,968	$117,971,154	$258,097,122	#315	#422	$140–180 million	
Total		$507,477,118	$343,345,836	$850,822,954			$263–305 million	
List indicator^{(A)} indicates the adjusted totals based on current ticket prices.

=== Critical and public response ===
Film	Rotten Tomatoes	Metacritic	CinemaScore
Rush Hour	64% (70 reviews)	60 (23 reviews)	A
Rush Hour 2	49% (122 reviews)	48 (28 reviews)	A
Rush Hour 3	18% (152 reviews)	44 (32 reviews)	A–

== Soundtracks ==
Year	Title	Chart positions		Certifications (sales thresholds)
Year	Title	U.S.	U.S. R&B	Certifications (sales thresholds)
1998	Rush Hour: Released: September 15, 1998; Label: Def Jam	5	2	US: Platinum
2001	Rush Hour 2: Released: July 31, 2001; Label: Def Jam	11	11	US: Gold
2007	Rush Hour 3: Released: August 8, 2007; Label: Def Jam	—	—	
List indicator: A dark grey cell indicates the information is not available for the film.
