= Rush Hour 2 =

2001 film by Brett Ratner

- Theatrical release poster
- Directed by: Brett Ratner
- Written by: Jeff Nathanson
- Based on: Characters by Ross LaManna
- Produced by: Roger Birnbaum; Jonathan Glickman; Arthur M. Sarkissian; Jay Stern
- Starring: Jackie Chan; Chris Tucker; John Lone; Alan King; Roselyn Sánchez; Harris Yulin; Zhang Ziyi
- Cinematography: Matthew F. Leonetti
- Edited by: Mark Helfrich
- Music by: Lalo Schifrin
- Production companies: Roger Birnbaum Productions; Salon Films
- Distributed by: New Line Cinema
- Release date: August 3, 2001
- Running time: 90 minutes
- Country: United States
- Languages: English; Cantonese; Mandarin
- Budget: $90 million
- Box office: $347.5 million

Rush Hour 2 is a 2001 American buddy cop action comedy film directed by Brett Ratner and written by Jeff Nathanson. A sequel to Rush Hour (1998), it is the second installment in the Rush Hour franchise and stars Jackie Chan and Chris Tucker reprising their roles from the first film. The story follows Hong Kong Police Force (HKPF) Chief Inspector Lee (Chan) and Los Angeles Police Department (LAPD) Detective James Carter (Tucker), who go to Hong Kong on vacation only to be thwarted by a murder case involving two U.S. customs agents after a bombing at the American embassy. Lee suspects that the crime is linked to the Triad crime lord Ricky Tan (Lone). This film was filmed in Hong Kong, Los Angeles and Las Vegas.

Rush Hour 2 was released by New Line Cinema on August 3, 2001, to mixed reviews. The film was a commercial success, grossing $347.5 million worldwide, making it the highest-grossing film in the franchise. It also became the year's fifth-highest-grossing film domestically in the United States, as well as the second-highest-grossing PG-13-rated film in that market. A sequel, Rush Hour 3, was released on August 10, 2007.

== Plot ==
Following their successful mission in Los Angeles (Note: As depicted in Rush Hour (1998)), LAPD Detective James Carter is in Hong Kong on vacation with his friend, Hong Kong Police Force Chief Inspector Lee. His vacation is put on hold when a bomb at the US Consulate General kills two undercover US Customs agents. Lee is assigned to the case and discovers that his late father's police partner, Ricky Tan, is somehow involved. Lee and Carter attempt to question Ricky, now a Triad leader, at a massage parlor, resulting in a brawl with his bodyguards forcing Lee and Carter to flee through Hong Kong while completely naked. After getting dressed, Carter tries to return to the massage parlor to retrieve his passport so he can return home.

The U.S. Secret Service, led by Agent Sterling, and the Hong Kong Police Force fight over jurisdiction of the case. Lee's office is bombed and Lee, unaware Carter has left the building, believes him dead. They reunite at a party on Ricky's yacht, where Ricky scolds his underling, Hu Li. Lee and Carter confront Ricky, who claims he is being framed by his enemies and asks for protection, but Hu Li shoots him and escapes. Sterling holds Lee responsible for Ricky's death and orders him off the case. Carter is ordered back to Los Angeles but convinces Lee to return to Los Angeles with him after hearing the history between Ricky Tan and Lee’s Father and realizing how personal the case is for Lee.

Upon their return to L.A., they start by investigating Steven Reign, a billionaire Los Angeles hotelier whom Carter met on Ricky Tan's boat and later saw acting suspiciously calm. Staking out Reign Towers, they spot Isabella Molina, whom Carter also met on Ricky's yacht, receiving a delivery from Hu Li. Mistaking the package for another bomb, Lee and Carter try to intervene, but Molina reveals she is an undercover U.S. Secret Service agent, looking into Reign's laundering operation of $100 million in superdollars, with the only difference being that they burn with a red color unlike real dollars.

Lee and Carter visit ex-con Kenny, now Carter's informant, who runs a gambling den in the back of his Chinese restaurant. He mentions a customer with a suspicious amount of hundred-dollar bills, which Carter confirms are Reign's counterfeits. They trace the money to a bank, where they are captured by Hu Li and the Triads. Taken to Las Vegas in a Triad truck, Lee and Carter escape, realizing that Reign is laundering the $100 million through his new Red Dragon Casino. At the Red Dragon, Molina points Lee to the engraving plates used to print the counterfeit money, while Carter creates a distraction to help Lee sneak past security. Hu Li captures Lee, taping a Ying Tao grenade in his mouth before bringing him to Ricky, who is still alive. When Ricky departs, Molina tries to arrest Hu Li but is shot, and Lee and Carter remove the grenade before Hu Li detonates it, evacuating the casino.

Carter fights and defeats Hu Li, accidentally knocking her out with a spear, while Lee pursues Ricky. In the casino's penthouse, Reign prepares to escape with the plates, but Ricky fatally stabs him. Lee and Carter confront Ricky, who admits to killing Lee's father. In the ensuing scuffle, Ricky falls to his death when Lee accidentally kicks him out of a window, thus avenging the death of Lee's father. Hu Li enters the room with a time bomb, forcing Lee and Carter to escape on a makeshift zip line as Hu Li dies in the explosion.

Later at McCarran International Airport, Sterling and Molina thank Lee for his work on the case and Molina kisses him. Planning to go their separate ways when Lee gives Carter his late father's police badge after finally finding closure for his father's death, Lee and Carter change their minds when Carter reveals the large amount of money he won at Caesars Palace. The pair head to New York City to indulge themselves.

== Cast ==
- Jackie Chan as Chief Inspector Lee, a Hong Kong cop. He invites Carter to Hong Kong for a vacation but accepts a case involving Ricky Tan, the man who killed his father.
- Chris Tucker as Detective James Carter, an LAPD detective who is in Hong Kong for vacation but quickly becomes entangled in an international investigation.
- Zhang Ziyi as Hu Li, a Triad assassin and enforcer.
- Roselyn Sánchez as Agent Isabella Molina of the Secret Service. She is working undercover, posing as a corrupt agent while also enlisting Lee and Carter to help her stop the Triads.
- John Lone as Ricky Tan, a Triad gangster working with Steven Reign.
- Alan King as Steven Reign, a corrupt Los Angeles businessman in league with the Triads to use his new casino to launder counterfeit money.
- Harris Yulin as Special Agent-In-Charge Sterling
- Kenneth Tsang as Captain Chin

The cast also includes Maggie Q as a young woman Carter unsuccessfully flirts with, Ernie Reyes Jr. as Zing, Jeremy Piven as a Versace salesman, Saul Rubinek a casino box man, Joel McKinnon Miller as Tex, and Gianni Russo as a pit boss, all have cameo appearances. Don Cheadle makes an uncredited appearance as Kenny, the owner of a Chinese restaurant in L.A. that also houses an illegal gambling den.

== Production ==
=== Filming ===
Filming took place between December 11, 2000 and April 30, 2001. Filming locations include the Desert Inn on the Las Vegas Strip in Las Vegas, as well as various locations in Hong Kong such as the Causeway Bay Typhoon Shelter or Tsim Sha Tsui police station.

=== Fake-money controversy ===
The prop masters for the film created approximately $1 trillion in fake money to be used as props in the film. The money was realistic enough that some of the film's extras pocketed it and attempted to spend it illegally outside of the production, which led to said fake money being confiscated and destroyed by the U.S. Secret Service.

=== Production ===
Director Brett Ratner claimed he had learned a lot from Jackie Chan's stunt work, and that choreographies for fight scenes in Rush Hour 2 were often designed on the day of filming. Ratner only informed Chan of where the scene should start and end for the sole purpose of storytelling, and left him to coordinate most of the action. Chris Tucker said the crew had wanted to bring "more of everything" to the sequel, which was echoed by Chan, who declared "There's got to be big actions, big stunts, big comedy, everything big!"

== Music ==
"Main Title"
Audio sample of the main title from Rush Hour 2

Lalo Schifrin returned to compose the score for the film. According to him, "The music for Rush Hour 2 is completely different from Rush Hour. The first 20–30 seconds of the main title is a reprise of the music from Rush Hour – but that's it." He said that Ratner had requested a "symphonic score", which he incidentally found suitable for Rush Hour 2:

For the sequel, he asked me to do a symphonic score. It was bigger than life – like an epic score. I ignored the comedy – the actors took care of that. I played to the chases and the danger. It's a serious score in the sense of an "epic" score, like Raiders of the Lost Ark or an Errol Flynn film. Also, you must realize that the symphony orchestra allows many more possibilities. Mozart didn't need a rhythm section to "drive". I was able to create a lot of energy without the use of drums and electric guitars and all that.

Schifrin performed the Rush Hour 2 score with the Hollywood Studio Symphony. Varèse Sarabande released the soundtrack album on compact disc in August 2001. In a 2001 interview with Dan Goldwasser for Soundtrack.Net, Schifrin was asked whether he would score Rush Hour 3, and he stated: "Oh, I'm not a prophet!" By 2007, he began composing the score for Rush Hour 3, which was his last motion picture score.

== Release ==
Before its August 3, 2001 release, Rush Hour 2 premiered on July 26, 2001, on-board the United Airlines Flight 1 from Los Angeles to Hong Kong renamed, "The Rush Hour Express". The Hong Kong Board of Tourism teamed up with United Airlines and New Line Cinema in a campaign that offered both trailers for the movie for passengers on all domestic United flights during July and August reaching an expected three million people, as well as Hong Kong travel videos to inspire tourists to visit the country where the film was set.

=== Box office ===
Rush Hour 2 earned $226.2 million in North America and an estimated $121.2 million in other countries, for a worldwide total of $347.4 million (surpassing Rush Hour and Rush Hour 3's worldwide box-office receipts). The film was ranked number one during its opening weekend, grossing $67.4 million at 3,118 locations. The film stayed in the Top 10 until October 11 (10 weeks total). It became one of the four 2001 films to generate $60 million in their first three days of release, with the others being Monsters, Inc., The Mummy Returns and Planet of the Apes. The film also had the fourth-highest opening weekend of all time, behind the latter two films and The Lost World: Jurassic Park. Additionally, Rush Hour 2 achieved two other records during its opening weekend, beating The Sixth Sense for having the biggest August opening weekend and Austin Powers: The Spy Who Shagged Me for scoring the largest opening weekend for a New Line Cinema film. The August opening weekend record would be held for six years before being surpassed by The Bourne Ultimatum in 2007. Rush Hour 2 would hold the record for having the highest opening weekend for a comedy film until 2002 when Austin Powers in Goldmember surpassed it. Despite being overtaken by American Pie 2, the film made $31.5 million during its second weekend. It was 2001's second-highest-grossing rated PG-13 film and the 11th highest-grossing film worldwide. Rush Hour 2 surpassed the 1984 film The Karate Kid as the highest-grossing martial arts action film, and was ranked as the second-highest-grossing buddy comedy film, behind the 1997 film Men in Black. The film was also ranked as the third-highest-grossing second installment in a live action comedy film franchise (behind the 2004 film Meet the Fockers and the 2011 film The Hangover Part II).

== Reception ==
Reviews for Rush Hour 2 were mixed. On Rotten Tomatoes, the film has an approval rating of 50% based on 127 reviews, with an average rating of 5.2/10. The website's critical consensus states that the film "doesn't feel as fresh or funny as the first, and the stunts lack some of the intricacy normally seen in Chan's films." On Metacritic, the film has a score of 48 out of 100 based on 28 reviews, indicating "mixed or average reviews". Audiences polled by CinemaScore during Rush Hour 2's opening weekend gave the film an average grade of A on an A+ to F scale.

Roger Ebert of the Chicago Sun-Times gave it one and half stars out of a possible four, calling Chris Tucker "an anchor around the ankles of the humor" in the movie. Conversely, Robert Koehler of Variety called it a "superior sequel" and "the very model of the limber, transnational Hollywood action comedy".

=== Awards ===
Rush Hour 2 earned 27 award nominations and 10 wins, including an MTV Movie Award for Best Fight, a Teen Choice Award for Film-Choice Actor, Comedy, and 3 Kids' Choice Awards: Favorite Movie Actor for Tucker, Favorite Male Butt Kicker for Chan, and Favorite Movie.

== Sequel ==
Because of various issues during development hell and production, Rush Hour 3 wasn't released until August 10, 2007, six years after Rush Hour 2. Rush Hour 3 failed to receive the critical and commercial acclaim of its predecessors, but was still a box office success.

== See also ==
- Buddy cop film
- Jackie Chan filmography
