= Jeff Nathanson =

American screenwriter

- Born: Jeffrey D. Nathanson; October 12, 1965 (age 60); Los Angeles County, California, U.S.
- Education: University of California, Santa Barbara; AFI Conservatory
- Occupations: Screenwriter; director; producer
- Years active: 1993–present

Jeffrey D. Nathanson (born October 12, 1965) is an American filmmaker. He is best known for writing two films of the Rush Hour series, as well as the Steven Spielberg films Catch Me If You Can and The Terminal.

== Early life and education ==
Nathanson was born in Los Angeles County, California. He attended the University of California, Santa Barbara as an English major from 1983 to 1985. While at UC Santa Barbara, he worked on the school's newspaper, the Daily Nexus, and has stated that the courses he took at UC Santa Barbara led him to want to become a screenwriter. He later enrolled in the screenwriting program at the AFI Conservatory for one year.

== Career ==
He is best known for his work on the Rush Hour sequels Rush Hour 2 and Rush Hour 3, Catch Me If You Can, The Terminal, and The Last Shot. He co-wrote a story draft for the film Indiana Jones and the Kingdom of the Crystal Skull (2008) with George Lucas; the film was directed by Steven Spielberg. He wrote the screenplay for Pirates of the Caribbean: Dead Men Tell No Tales (2017), on which he also received a story by co-credit, the latter with Terry Rossio. He wrote the script for the 2019 live-action remake of The Lion King for Disney, directed by Jon Favreau. He also wrote its 2024 prequel, Mufasa: The Lion King, directed by Barry Jenkins.

On October 3, 2017, it was reported that Nathanson would be penning a script for a biographical film directed by Brett Ratner based on the life of the Playboy founder Hugh Hefner, who will be portrayed by Academy Award winner Jared Leto. However the film was put indefinitely on hold and was confirmed that Leto would not portray the Playboy founder following emergence of sexual harassment allegations against Ratner that November.

== Awards and honors ==
Nathanson was nominated for a Best Original Screenplay British Academy of Film and Television Arts Award for his work on Catch Me If You Can.

== Film writer credits ==
Year	Title	Director	Notes
1995	For Better or Worse	Jason Alexander	Also executive producer
1997	Speed 2: Cruise Control	Jan de Bont	
2001	Rush Hour 2	Brett Ratner	
2002	Catch Me If You Can	Steven Spielberg	
2004	The Terminal	Steven Spielberg	
2004	The Last Shot	Himself	
2007	Rush Hour 3	Brett Ratner	
2008	Indiana Jones and the Kingdom of the Crystal Skull	Steven Spielberg	Story only, co-written with George Lucas and David Koepp
2008	New York, I Love You	Brett Ratner	Segment #5
2011	Tower Heist	Brett Ratner	
2017	Pirates of the Caribbean: Dead Men Tell No Tales	Joachim Rønning; Espen Sandberg	
2019	The Lion King	Jon Favreau	
2024	Young Woman and the Sea	Joachim Rønning	Also producer
2024	Mufasa: The Lion King	Barry Jenkins	

Uncredited

- Men in Black 3 (2012)
- Wonka (2023)
- Haunted Mansion (2023)
