= Rush Hour 3 =

2007 film by Brett Ratner

- Theatrical release poster
- Directed by: Brett Ratner
- Written by: Jeff Nathanson
- Based on: Characters by Ross LaManna
- Produced by: Roger Birnbaum; Jonathan Glickman; Jay Stern; Arthur M. Sarkissian; Andrew Z. Davis
- Starring: Jackie Chan; Chris Tucker; Hiroyuki Sanada; Youki Kudoh; Max von Sydow
- Cinematography: J. Michael Muro
- Edited by: Mark Helfrich; Dean Zimmerman; Don Zimmerman
- Music by: Lalo Schifrin
- Production companies: Roger Birnbaum Productions; Arthur Sarkissian Productions; Unlike Film Productions
- Distributed by: New Line Cinema
- Release dates: July 30, 2007 (Los Angeles); August 10, 2007 (United States)
- Running time: 90 minutes
- Country: United States
- Language: English
- Budget: $125–180 million
- Box office: $258 million

Rush Hour 3 is a 2007 American buddy cop action comedy film directed by Brett Ratner, written by Jeff Nathanson. It is the third installment in the Rush Hour franchise and the sequel to Rush Hour 2 (2001). Jackie Chan, Chris Tucker, Tzi Ma and Philip Baker Hall reprise their roles from the previous films with Hiroyuki Sanada, Youki Kudoh and Max von Sydow joining the cast. The story centers on Hong Kong Police Force (HKPF) Chief Inspector Lee (Chan) and Los Angeles Police Department (LAPD) Detective James Carter (Tucker) tracking an assassin (Sanada) to Paris to unravel a mystery about the Chinese triads.

Announced on May 7, 2006, filming began on July 4 on location in Paris and Los Angeles. Released by New Line Cinema on August 10, 2007, the film grossed $258 million worldwide against a production budget of $125–180 million, but was not well received from critics. It was the last film scored by prolific film composer Lalo Schifrin. A sequel is in development with Ratner set to return as director.

== Plot ==
Three years after the killing of Ricky Tan and his bodyguards (Note: As depicted in Rush Hour 2 (2001).), Chinese Ambassador Solon Han, with Hong Kong Police Force Chief Inspector Lee as his bodyguard, addresses the importance of fighting the Triads at the World Criminal Court in Los Angeles, while LAPD Detective James Carter is working as a traffic cop.

Just before Han announces the whereabouts of Shy Shen, a semi-mythical individual of great importance to the Chinese mob, an assassin shoots him. Lee chases after and corners the shooter but hesitates when he learns that the assassin is his childhood foster brother, Kenji, allowing him to escape just as Carter arrives having heard about the shooting over the police radio.

Han is later hospitalized at UCLA Medical Center, having survived the assassination attempt, and Lee and Carter promise his daughter Soo Yung to find the person responsible. She insists they head to the local Kung Fu studio to retrieve an envelope Han left her, but they learn from studio master Yu that the Triads took Soo Yung's belongings and are heading to the hospital to kill Soo Yung and Han.

Lee and Carter return to the hospital to intercept the hitmen who came to kill Han. After defeating them, Lee and Carter interrogate one of them who apparently only speaks French with the help of Sister Agnes, a French-speaking nun. For her protection, they take Soo Yung to the French Consulate General in Los Angeles, leaving her with the French ambassador and chairman of the World Criminal Court, Varden Reynard. Reynard and Soo Yung are nearly killed by a car bomb, so Lee and Carter go to Paris to investigate this case further.

After a painful inspection from Parisian Commissaire Revi, Lee and Carter meet anti-American taxicab driver George and force him to drive them to a Triad hideout. While there, Carter meets stage performer Geneviève while Lee is tricked by mob assassin Jasmine, who claims to have information about Shy Shen, and Carter saves Lee from being killed.

The pair tries to escape but is ultimately captured by Kenji's men. They are taken to the sewers where Kenji promises to let them live if they leave Paris, but Lee refuses when Kenji cannot grant the same for Han and Soo Yung. Following a short struggle, he and Carter successfully escape. They recover and rest at a hotel, and Lee soon reveals his relationship with Kenji and decides to continue alone after declaring Carter as not his brother, in the same manner as Kenji.

A disillusioned Carter leaves but recomposes himself when he spots and follows Geneviève. Meanwhile, Reynard meets Lee and explains Shy Shen is not a person but a list of Triad leaders and that Geneviève is Han's informant with access to the list. After locating Geneviève and saving her from being killed, the two flee with her to their hotel. They are attacked by Jasmine, but George rescues them. Geneviève reveals to Lee and Carter that the Triad leaders' names were tattooed on the back of her head and that she will be beheaded if the Triads capture her. Lee and Carter bring her to Reynard, who reveals he was working with the Triads.

Kenji calls to inform Lee that he has captured Soo Yung and demands he turn over Geneviève. Lee arrives at the Eiffel Tower to make the exchange, with Carter disguised as Geneviève with a wig. Enraged, Kenji challenges Lee to a sword fight, during which the two fall into a safety net. After Kenji's sword cuts the net, Lee tries to save him, but Kenji is touched by Lee's kindness and lets go, falling to his death and devastating Lee. Meanwhile, Carter single-handedly fights off Kenji's henchmen, manages to save Soo Yung, and defeats Jasmine by kicking her into an elevator wheel that bisects her.

After escaping the remaining Triad members, Carter and Lee are confronted by Reynard, who threatens to kill Geneviève and frame them. However, George shoots Reynard from behind, killing him. As the police arrive, Revi tries to take credit for Lee and Carter's work, but they both knock him out with a double punch and leave with a victory dance to Edwin Starr's "War".

== Cast ==
- Jackie Chan as Chief Inspector Lee, the head of Ambassador Han's security detail.
- Chris Tucker as Detective James Carter. Carter is assigned to traffic duty at the beginning of the film as punishment for an unspecified offense when he gets drawn into the investigation of Ambassador Han's shooting.
- Hiroyuki Sanada as Kenji, Lee's childhood foster brother who grew up together with Lee in an orphanage but later turned to a life of crime.
- Max von Sydow as Varden Reynard, a corrupt head of the World Criminal Court who is secretly in league with the Triads.
- Yvan Attal as George Cabbie, a French taxi driver.
- Youki Kudoh as Dragon Lady Jasmine
- Noémie Lenoir as Geneviève / Shy Shen, a French burlesque performer who gets involved with the Triads after dating Kenji.
- Zhang Jingchu as Soo-Yung Han, Ambassador Han's daughter.
- Tzi Ma as Ambassador Solon Han, the Chinese Ambassador to the U.S. whom Kenji attempts to assassinate.
- Roman Polanski as Commissaire Revi (uncredited), a French policeman who assaults Lee and Carter at the airport and later attempts to take credit for their work.
- Philip Baker Hall as Captain Bill Diel (uncredited), Carter's supervisor in the LAPD.
- Dana Ivey as Sister Agnes, a nun fluent in French who translates for Carter and Lee.
- Henry O as Master Yu
- Mia Tyler as Marsha
- Sarah Shahi as Zoe (uncredited)
- David Niven Jr. as British Foreign Minister
- Sun Mingming as Kung-Fu Giant
- Julie Depardieu as Paulette

== Production ==
After the commercial success of the first and second films in the franchise, Chris Tucker received a salary of $25 million, Jackie Chan received $15 million, Brett Ratner $7.5 million, and Jeff Nathanson $3 million. In addition, Chan received 15% of the box office revenue as well as distribution rights in China and Hong Kong, bringing his total earnings to at least $53,700,000 (equivalent to $83,400,000 in 2025).

The scene where Chan and Tucker fight the Kung-Fu Giant, played by Chinese basketball player Sun Mingming, is a parody of Bruce Lee's Game of Death, where Lee fights a taller black man played by NBA basketball player Kareem Abdul-Jabbar. The film subverts it by having a shorter African-American man, Tucker, fight a taller Chinese man played by a basketball player, Sun.

== Release ==
The film was not screened in Chinese theaters in 2007, to make way for a larger variety of foreign films for that year, according to a business representative (the quota for imported films was 20 per year at the time).

== Soundtrack ==
Lalo Schifrin composed the soundtrack, interspersed with hip hop and R&B music. Two soundtrack albums were released. An album of the hip hop and R&B music used was released on August 8, 2007, on CD and audio cassette from New Line Records and Columbia Records. Another, containing Schifrin's original compositions for the film was released on the Varèse Sarabande label.

== Reception ==
=== Box office ===
Rush Hour 3 opened on August 10, 2007, and grossed $49.1 million in its opening weekend.

Brandon Gray of Box Office Mojo noted:

Rush Hour 3 was marketed as just another Rush Hour picture, in part because the movie itself is a slight romp, and lacked the event-style build-up that Rush Hour 2 had. What's more, Chan hasn't been on American screens for three years, while Tucker's last movie was Rush Hour 2. A repetitious entry in a series without a major new hook doesn't quite cut it after a six-year wait if the intent is to build or retain an audience. That Rush Hour 3 had a sizable debut is a credit to the good will generated by the first two pictures.

The film grossed $258 million worldwide.

=== Critical response ===
On Rotten Tomatoes, Rush Hour 3 has an approval rating of 17% based on 157 reviews, with an average rating of 4.2/10. The site's critical consensus reads, "Rush Hour 3 is a tired rehash of the earlier films, and a change of scenery can't hide a lack of new ideas." Todd Gilchrist of IGN Movies said, "A movie that not only depends on but demands you don't think in order to enjoy it." On Metacritic, the film has a score of 44 out of 100, based on 32 critics, indicating "mixed or average reviews". Audiences surveyed by CinemaScore gave the film an average grade of "A−" on an A+ to F scale.

Desson Thomson of The Washington Post, giving it three and a half stars out of five, said "at the risk of eternal damnation on the Internet, I admit to laughing at – even feeling momentarily touched by – Rush Hour 3." Christian Toto of The Washington Times said, "The Rush job should put the franchise down for good." Roger Ebert of the Chicago Sun-Times was slightly more positive giving the film two stars and saying, "...once you realize it's only going to be so good, you settle back and enjoy that modest degree of goodness, which is at least not badness, and besides, if you're watching Rush Hour 3, you obviously didn't have anything better to do, anyway." James Berardinelli of ReelViews gave the film one-and-a-half stars out of four, and said the movie was dull, uninspired and redundant. Nick De Semlyen of Empire gave it a two out of five review, explaining that "like Lethal Weapon, this franchise has become lazier and less thrilling with each installment. Hopefully, unlike Lethal Weapon, they'll stop at Part Three."

In 2025, during an interview with BuzzFeed, Jackie Chan expressed his disappointment with the film in comparison to its two predecessors, stating the following:

"You know what, the first one: little money, little time. We shot it like, 'Go, go, go, go!' The second one: a lot of money, a lot of time. The third one: too much money, too much time. Too much money is no good."

=== Home media ===
The film was released on December 26, 2007 by New Line Home Entertainment, (Note: The DVD release date of Rush Hour 3 varies, as it was seen in Wal-Mart stores on December 22, 2007, while in advertisements for other stores it was not scheduled for release until December 26.) on DVD and Blu-ray. As of March 30, 2008, it made $80.75 million in home video rentals, making it the top rental of 2007. As of 2018, the film has grossed $45 million in American DVD sales.

== Sequel ==
Tucker said in 2019 that he, Chan, and the studio were all interested in a sequel. As of 25 November 2025, the fourth film is in development with Ratner returning to direct.

== See also ==
- Jackie Chan filmography
