= Arthur M. Sarkissian =

Armenian-American film producer

- Occupation: Film producer
- Years active: 1977–present

Arthur M. Sarkissian (Armenian: Արթուր Սարգսյան) is an Armenian-American film producer mainly known for being one of the producers of the Rush Hour series. He is also a former fashion designer based in England, UK, and the founder of a production company under his own name, Sarkissian Productions. He also served as a judge for the screenwriting competition called Script2Screens in 2020 that was focused on finding new and upcoming writers in the field.

== Filmography ==
=== Films ===
Year	Film	Role	Ref.
1985	Beyond Reason	Executive Producer	
1986	Quiet Cool	Delegate producer (uncredited); executive producer	
1986	Wanted: Dead or Alive	Executive producer	
1989	Chrome Hearts	Executive producer	
1990	Spontaneous Combustion	Executive producer	
1995	While You Were Sleeping	Executive producer	
1996	Last Man Standing		
1998	Rush Hour		
2001	Rush Hour 2		
2002	The Glow	Executive producer	
2003	Risk	Executive producer	
2007	How to Rob a Bank (and 10 Tips to Actually Get Away with It)		
2007	Rush Hour 3		
2011	Kill the Irishman	Executive producer	
2016	Silver Skies	Executive producer	
2017	The Foreigner		
2021	The Protégé		
2018	The Gate	Executive producer (pre-production)	

=== Television ===
Year(s)	Series	Role	Episode(s)	Notes	Ref.
2012–2013	Las Vegas	Producer	21		
2016	Rush Hour	Producer	13		
