= The Glow (film) =

- Genre: Psychological thriller
- Written by: Gary Sherman
- Directed by: Craig R. Baxley
- Starring: Dean Cain; Portia de Rossi; Hal Linden; Dina Merrill; Joseph Campanella
- Music by: Gary Chang
- Country of origin: United States
- Original language: English

Production
- Executive producers: Arthur M. Sarkissian; Laura Armstrong; Charles Freericks; Gary Sherman
- Producer: Iain Paterson
- Cinematography: João Fernandes
- Editor: Ross Albert
- Running time: 89 minutes
- Production companies: Fox Television Studios; New Line Television

Original release
- Network: Fox
- Release: August 30, 2002

The Glow is a 2002 American made-for-television psychological thriller film directed by Craig R. Baxley and starring Dean Cain, Portia de Rossi, Hal Linden, Dina Merrill and Joseph Campanella. The film originally aired on Fox on August 30, 2002.

== Plot ==
New Yorkers Jackie and Matt Lawrence get married. They are looking for a new apartment. When Matt is ambushed while jogging in the park, three retirees help him. They give the couple a comfortable but inexpensive apartment with a view of Central Park.

Matt takes out a loan from the seniors.

Shortly after moving in, another young married couple who lived in the same house disappear without a trace. Jackie and Matt find out that the old people kill young people in order to keep themselves alive longer with body substances. Several bodies are found in the basement of the house.

== Cast ==
- Dean Cain as Matt Lawrence
- Portia de Rossi as Jackie Lawrence
- Hal Linden as Arnold Janusz
- Dina Merrill as Phoebe Janusz
- Joseph Campanella as Ben Goodstein
- Grace Zabriskie as Sylvia Goodstein
- John Gilbert as Victor
- Corrine Connely as Miriam
- Ian Downie as Buddy
- Sabrina Grdevich as Trish
- Jason Blicker as Allan
- Kari Matchett as Allison
- Jonas Chernick as Randy
