= Chris Tucker =

American actor and comedian (born 1971)

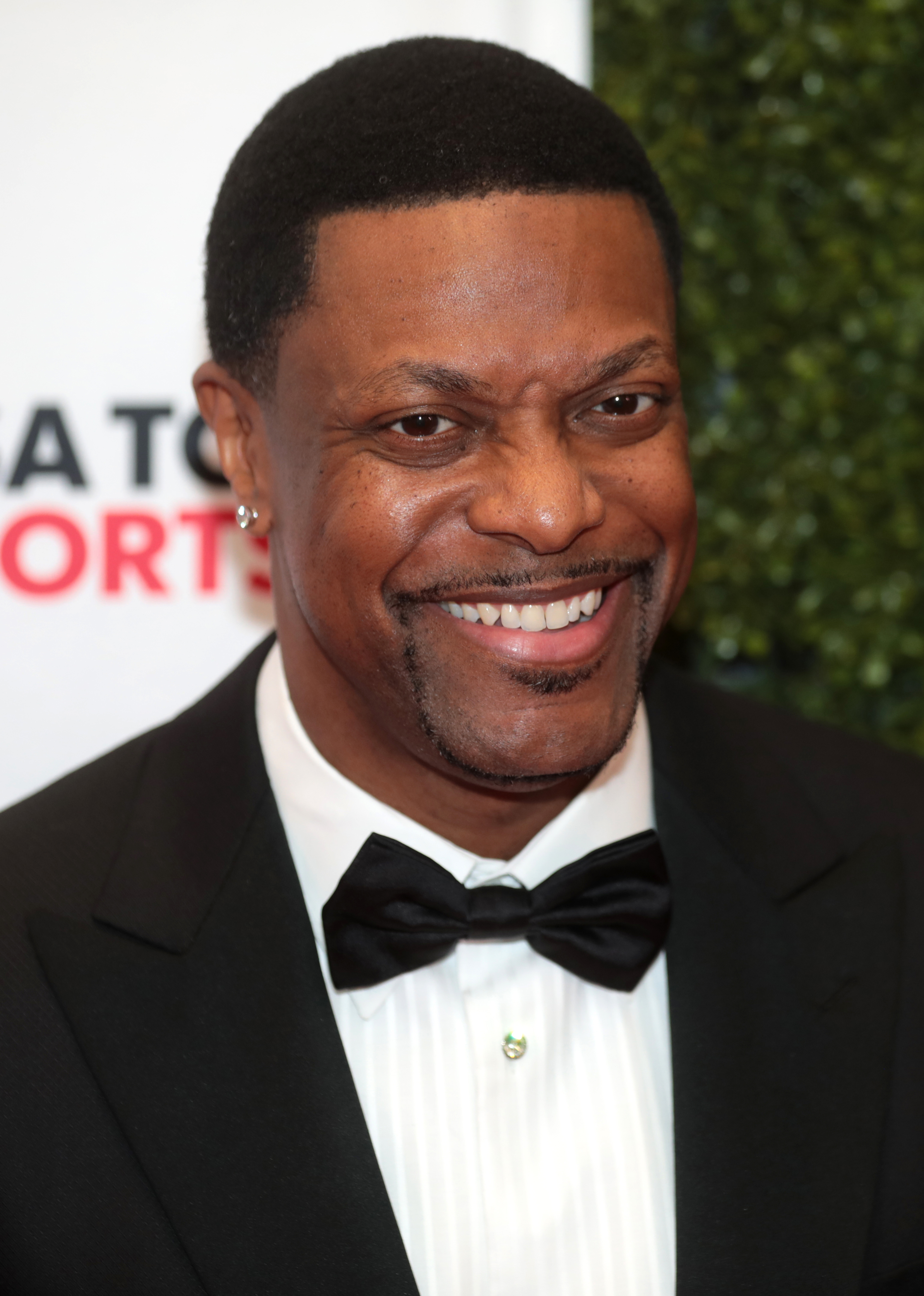
- Tucker in 2019
- Born: Christopher Tucker; August 31, 1971 (age 55); Atlanta, Georgia, U.S.
- Spouse: Azja Pryor (m. 1997; div. 2003)
- Children: 1

Comedy career
- Years active: 1992–present
- Medium: Stand-up; film; television
- Genres: Observational comedy; sarcasm; black comedy; insult comedy
- Subjects: African-American culture; current events; human sexuality; pop culture; race relations; racism

Christopher Tucker (born August 31, 1971) is an American stand-up comedian and actor. He made his debut in 1992 as a stand-up performer on the HBO comedy series Def Comedy Jam, where he frequently appeared on the show during the 1990s. He made his feature film debut in House Party 3 in 1994 and gained greater recognition in Friday the following year. In 1997, he co-starred in the films The Fifth Element and Money Talks, and had a supporting role in Quentin Tarantino's Jackie Brown. Tucker gained international fame in the 2000s for playing Detective James Carter in the Rush Hour film series.

== Early life, education, and career ==
Christopher Tucker was born in Atlanta, Georgia, on August 31, 1971, the youngest son of Mary Louise (née Bryant) and Norris Tucker. One of six children, Tucker learned early in life that humor had the power to draw attention to himself both at school and at home. His father was an independent businessman who owned a janitorial service. Tucker grew up in a Pentecostal Christian household; his parents were members of the Church of God in Christ during his childhood.

Tucker grew up in Decatur, Georgia, and after graduating from Columbia High School, he moved to Los Angeles to pursue his comedy career. His comedy influences were Richard Pryor and Eddie Murphy, and Tucker was known by his teachers and high school classmates for making people laugh by doing impressions of Murphy, Michael Jackson, and others.

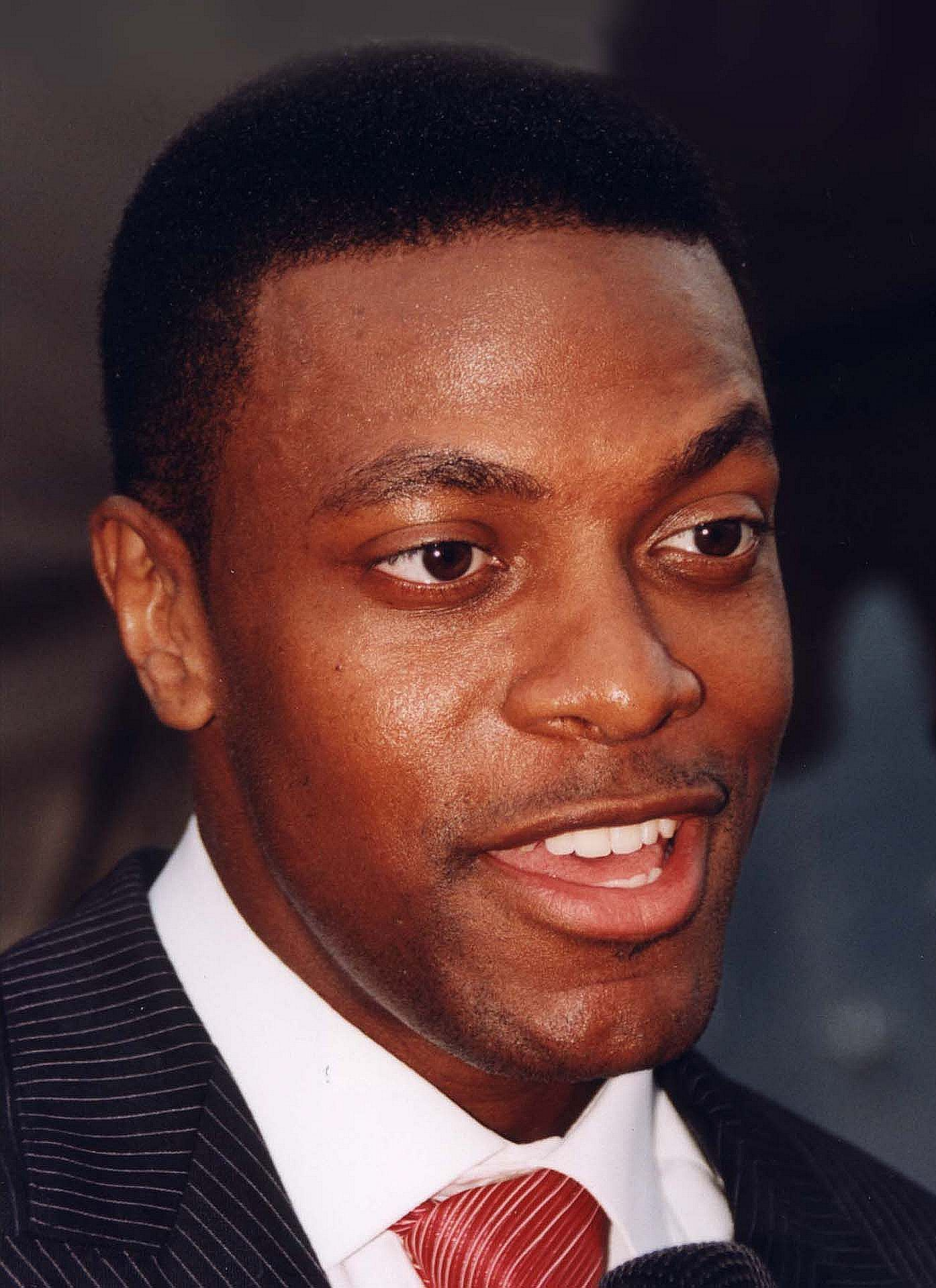
Tucker in 2000

=== 1990–1997: Career beginnings ===
Tucker began showcasing his comedy skills before an audience in local Atlanta comedy clubs until he decided to move to Los Angeles in 1990 to further pursue his stand-up comedy career. In 1992, Tucker was a frequent performer on the HBO comedy series Def Comedy Jam. He made his cinematic debut in House Party 3 in 1994 and gained greater film recognition alongside N.W.A rapper Ice Cube in Friday the following year. In 1997, he co-starred in the films The Fifth Element and Money Talks. He later starred in the film Double-O-Soul, which was never released.

=== 1998–2010: Mainstream recognition ===
Along with Hong Kong actor and martial artist Jackie Chan, Tucker starred as LAPD detective James Carter in the martial arts action comedy film series Rush Hour. After the commercial success of the first Rush Hour film, he held out for a $20 million salary for Rush Hour 2, and was paid $25 million for Rush Hour 3. The latter was part of a $40 million two-movie contract with New Line Cinema that also included an unnamed future film. He was also to receive 20% of the gross from Rush Hour 3.

Tucker did not reprise his role as Smokey in Next Friday (2000) or Friday After Next (2002) for religious reasons, later saying that he did not want to use profanity or smoke marijuana. He starred in Michael Jackson's video "You Rock My World" and made a cameo appearance in Tupac Shakur's "California Love". On February 13, 2009, Tucker participated in the NBA All-Star Weekend's Celebrity Game. Other celebrities participating included rapper Master P, NBA Hall of Famers Clyde Drexler and Dominique Wilkins, wide receiver Terrell Owens, and four Harlem Globetrotters.

Tucker was announced in 2007 to star in the New Line drama film Mr. S: My Life with Frank Sinatra, directed by Ratner and based on George Jacobs autobiography of working as Frank Sinatra's valet during the Rat Pack era of 1953–68, but the film was never made.

=== 2011–present: Comeback and further success ===
In 2011, Tucker made a comeback to stand-up comedy. The next year, he returned to film in Silver Linings Playbook, co-starring Bradley Cooper, Jennifer Lawrence, and Robert De Niro. Tucker's performance in the film was well received by critics and audiences alike. The film itself received numerous nominations and awards including the Broadcast Film Critics Association Award for Best Cast. He also hosted the BET Awards 2013. In 2016, he appeared in Billy Lynn's Long Halftime Walk. In 2023, he portrayed Nike executive Howard White in the film Air.

Tucker is expected to reprise his role in a fourth Rush Hour film, which began production in November 2025 after U.S. President Donald Trump reportedly pushed for its creation.

== Politics ==
He endorsed Barack Obama in the 2008 primaries.

In 2021, Tucker joined the Heal Los Angeles Foundation as an official ambassador. The Foundation is co-founded by Michael Jackson's son, Prince Jackson, and their purpose is to help inner-city youth in Los Angeles by ending homelessness, child abuse, and hunger in the city.

During the 2022 Halloween Thriller Night hosted by the Heal Los Angeles Foundation, Tucker and Steve Harvey were honored and received the inaugural "Man in The Mirror" Award. The award is given to influential individuals using their platforms for good. Tucker accepted the award that was presented by Prince Jackson.

In 2025, Tucker participated in the Riyadh Comedy Festival. Joey Shea, a Saudi Arabia researcher at Human Rights Watch, said in a statement that the Saudi government is using the comedy festival to whitewash its human rights abuses.

== Personal life ==
Tucker has a son named Destin with his ex-wife Azja Pryor. He divides his time between Los Angeles, Las Vegas, and Atlanta.

Tucker is good friends with fellow Rush Hour co-star Jackie Chan. He was also close with singer Michael Jackson: introducing and dancing with him at his 30th Anniversary Celebration; appearing in his video "You Rock My World" from the 2001 album Invincible; testifying on Jackson's behalf during his 2005 trial, and attending his memorial service. Tucker's career was also influenced by Jackson, as he is seen dancing and singing to "Don't Stop 'Til You Get Enough" in a scene in Rush Hour 2 and imitating Jackson's dancing style in Friday.

Tucker participated in Professor Henry Louis Gates Jr.'s 2006 PBS documentary on the genetic makeup of African Americans, African American Lives, that specifically focused on stories of Native American heritage in African-American communities. Tucker's DNA test results showed African, European, and "likely some Native American" ancestors. Tucker's patrilineal ancestry was also traced back to the Ambundu ethnic group of Angola and one line of his mother's to the Bamileke of Cameroon. He also traced his family tree back to the 1830s. Tucker and Gates were shown visiting Angola, the birthplace of some of his ancestors.

In 2014, Tucker settled a $2.5 million tax debt. A representative blamed "poor accounting and business management". In November 2021, the IRS sued Tucker, seeking $9.6 million in back taxes. Tucker settled the lawsuit for $3.6 million in 2023.

Also in 2014, Tucker told an interviewer that he refrains from using harsh profanity in his performances due to his Christian faith.

Tucker's connection to convicted child sex offender Jeffrey Epstein was covered in the 2020 Netflix documentary series Jeffrey Epstein: Filthy Rich. In 2002, Tucker traveled in Epstein's airplane alongside Bill Clinton and Kevin Spacey for humanitarian purposes in combating the HIV/AIDS epidemic in Africa. However, Tucker being a passenger on Epstein's airplane, dubbed the "Lolita Express" by media, for the September 2002 African humanitarian event had in fact previously been made public prior to the revelations of Epstein controversies, with an article in the October 28, 2002 issue of New York Magazine noting that Tucker, Clinton and Spacey's flight on Epstein's plane greatly increased the media awareness of Epstein, who prior to this was hardly even mentioned in gossip columns. In November 2025, Tucker was confirmed to have been in Epstein's personal contact book.

== Filmography ==
=== Film ===
Year	Title	Role	Notes
1993	The Meteor Man	M.C. in Mall	Uncredited
1994	House Party 3	Johnny Booze	
1995	Friday	Smokey	
1995	Panther	Bodyguard	
1995	Dead Presidents	Skip	
1997	The Fifth Element	Ruby Rhod	
1997	Money Talks	Franklin Maurice Hatchett	Also executive producer
1997	Jackie Brown	Beaumont Livingston	
1998	Rush Hour	James Carter	
2001	Rush Hour 2	James Carter	
2007	Rush Hour 3	James Carter	
2012	Silver Linings Playbook	Danny McDaniels	
2016	Billy Lynn's Long Halftime Walk	Albert Brown	
2023	Air	Howard White	Also writer: additional literary material (uncredited)

=== Television ===
Year	Title	Role	Notes
1992	Hangin' with Mr. Cooper	Rapper	Episode: "Please Pass the Jock"
1992	Def Comedy Jam	Himself	2 episodes
2001	32nd NAACP Image Awards	Himself	Host; television special
2001	Michael Jackson: 30th Anniversary Celebration	Himself	Guest
2001	Diary	Himself	Episode: "What About Me?"
2002	33rd NAACP Image Awards	Himself	Host; television special
2005	36th NAACP Image Awards	Himself	Host; television special
2006	African American Lives	Himself	4 episodes
2013	BET Awards 2013	Himself	Host; television special
2015	Chris Tucker – Live	Himself	Netflix exclusive stand-up comedy special
2020	2nd Annual Urban One Honors	Himself	Co-host; television special
2020	Jeffrey Epstein: Filthy Rich	Himself	Archive footage

=== Music videos ===
Year	Title	Artist
1994	"Nuttin' But Love (Heavy D)"	Heavy D & the Boyz
1995	"Keep Their Heads Ringin'"	Dr. Dre
1995	"California Love"	Tupac Shakur featuring Dr. Dre & Roger Troutman
1997	"Feel So Good"	Mase
2001	"You Rock My World"	Michael Jackson
2005	"Shake It Off"	Mariah Carey
2021	"Love One Another"	Tito Jackson

== Awards and nominations ==
Year	Award	Category	Nominated work	Result
1995	MTV Movie Award	Best Comedic Performance	Friday	Nominated
1995	MTV Movie Award	Best Breakthrough Performance	Friday	Nominated
1995	MTV Movie Award	Best On-Screen Duo (with Ice Cube)	Friday	Nominated
1997	Razzie Award	Worst New Star	The Fifth Element	Nominated
1997	Razzie Award	Worst New Star	Money Talks	Nominated
1998	Blockbuster Entertainment Award	Favorite Duo – Action/Adventure (with Jackie Chan)	Rush Hour	Won
1998	MTV Movie Award	Best On-Screen Duo (with Jackie Chan)	Rush Hour	Won
1998	Image Awards	Outstanding Lead Actor in a Motion Picture	Rush Hour	Nominated
1998	Kids Choice Awards	Favorite Movie Actor	Rush Hour	Nominated
1998	MTV Movie Award	Best Comedic Performance	Rush Hour	Nominated
1998	MTV Movie Award	MTV Movie Award for Best Fight (with Jackie Chan)	Rush Hour	Nominated
2001	Kids Choice Awards	Favorite Movie Actor	Rush Hour 2	Won
2001	BET Award	Best Actor	Rush Hour 2	Nominated
2001	Kids Choice Awards	Favorite Male Butt Kicker	Rush Hour 2	Nominated
2001	MTV Movie Award	Best Fight (with Jackie Chan)	Rush Hour 2	Won
2001	MTV Movie Award	Best Comedic Performance	Rush Hour 2	Nominated
2001	MTV Movie Award	Best Musical Sequence	Rush Hour 2	Nominated
2001	MTV Movie Award	Best On-Screen (with Jackie Chan)	Rush Hour 2	Nominated
2001	Teen Choice Award	Movie Actor - Comedy	Rush Hour 2	Won
2001	Teen Choice Award	Movie: Chemistry (with Jackie Chan)	Rush Hour 2	Nominated
2007	People's Choice Award	Favorite On-Screen Match-up (with Jackie Chan)	Rush Hour 3	Nominated
2007	MTV Movie Award	Best Fight (with Jackie Chan and Sun Mingming)	Rush Hour 3	Nominated
2012	Broadcast Film Critics Association	Best Cast	Silver Linings Playbook	Won
2012	Screen Actors Guild Award	Outstanding Cast in a Motion Picture	Silver Linings Playbook	Nominated
