= Money Talks (1997 film) =

- Theatrical release poster
- Directed by: Brett Ratner
- Written by: Joel Cohen; Alec Sokolow
- Produced by: Walter Coblenz; Tracy Kramer
- Starring: Chris Tucker; Charlie Sheen; Heather Locklear; Gerard Ismael; Paul Sorvino
- Cinematography: Russell Carpenter; Robert Primes
- Edited by: Mark Helfrich
- Music by: Lalo Schifrin
- Distributed by: New Line Cinema
- Release date: August 22, 1997
- Running time: 96 minutes
- Country: United States
- Languages: English; French
- Budget: $25 million
- Box office: $48.4 million

Money Talks is a 1997 American action comedy film directed by Brett Ratner (in his feature film directorial debut) and starring Chris Tucker and Charlie Sheen. It is the first of four collaborations between Ratner and Tucker, with the other three being the Rush Hour series.

Money Talks was released by New Line Cinema on August 22, 1997, and grossed $48.4 million at the box office against a production budget of $25 million. It received generally negative reviews from critics.

== Plot ==
In Los Angeles, Franklin Maurice Hatchett is a fast-talking, foul-mouthed, small-time car wash hustler and ticket scalper who owes money to a local mobster named Carmine. The police are informed of his crimes by investigating news reporter James Russell after Franklin unintentionally thwarts James' attempts to have him confess his crimes on camera, and he is arrested. When placed on a prison transport unit, he is handcuffed to a French criminal named Raymond Villard. The transport unit is attacked on a bridge with mercenaries killing all the police officers and prisoners except for Franklin and Villard; the mercenaries are Villard's men. Because he is handcuffed to Franklin he decides to bring him along, and they escape on a helicopter with another French criminal named Dubray. While on the helicopter, Franklin overhears the two discussing the location of a cache of stolen diamonds. Franklin then jumps out of the helicopter after realizing that Villard and Dubray plan to kill him. Franklin is recognized by police officers but is able to elude them, and he decides to call James after seeing his face in an advertisement.

James has just been fired from his job at Channel 12 News after arguing with his boss Barclay, but he convinces Franklin to hide with him because the next week is Sweeps Week. He arranges to get his job back with an exclusive interview with Franklin. Together they attend James' wedding rehearsal dinner, where Franklin meets James' fiancé Grace and ingratiates himself to Grace's father Guy by pretending to be Vic Damone's son. In the meantime, two police detectives question Franklin's girlfriend Paula and wiretap her phone. After calling Paula, Franklin tries to leave but realizes that the police are searching for him, and he convinces James to help him. The two rampage all over the city to find clues to clear Franklin's name, including calling a bomb threat on a European nightclub, getting shot at by the police when they visit Paula, and being chased by Villard and Dubray, who murder a shopkeeper in the process, which eventually gets James' name involved and spread all over the news. The two visit Franklin's childhood friend Aaron, a local arms dealer, who gives them guns and promises to help if they get into trouble. The following morning, Franklin convinces Guy to take him to the auto expo where the Europeans stashed the diamonds (in a Jaguar XK140). Franklin and Guy get into a bidding war with Villard and Dubray over the car with the diamonds inside, which ends with Dubray chaotically chasing Franklin across the city while Villard kidnaps James.

Villard then calls Franklin using James' phone and demands the return of his diamonds. Realizing that he has no chance on his own, Franklin calls the police detectives, Carmine, the French mercenaries, and Aaron, telling them all to meet him at the Coliseum. It is revealed that Detective Bobby Pickett is a dirty cop working for Villard. A massive shootout ensues in which both police detectives and Carmine and his crew are all wiped out. Aaron shows up with a henchman, an assault rifle, and an RPG, and proceeds to wipe out most of Villard's men, including Dubray and Pickett. In the meantime, James manages to escape from Villard's men, after placing several unpinned grenades beneath his helicopter, ready to detonate if he tries to take off. He then reunites with Franklin, saving him from being shot by Villard. However, when cornered once again, Franklin realizes that the diamonds are not worth dying for, and throws them at Villard's remaining men, who drop their weapons and begin grabbing as many as they can. The police arrive in the meantime. Villard tries to escape in the helicopter and the grenades detonate, killing him. In the end, both Franklin and James are cleared and branded as heroes. Franklin saves an unknown amount of the diamonds and puts one on a wedding ring that he gives to James, who marries Grace with Franklin as his best man. Before the credits roll, James (alongside Grace), Guy (alongside Connie), and Franklin (alongside Paula) walk down the stairs presumably heading out on a date.

== Cast ==
- Chris Tucker as Franklin Maurice Hatchett
- Charlie Sheen as James Russell
- Heather Locklear as Grace Cipriani
- Gerard Ismael as Raymond Villard
- Elise Neal as Paula
- Michael Wright as Aaron
- Paul Sorvino as Guy Cipriani
- Larry Hankin as Roland
- Paul Gleason as Det. Bobby Pickett
- Daniel Roebuck as Det. Williams
- Frank Bruynbroek as Debray
- Veronica Cartwright as Connie Cipriani
- Damian Chapa as Carmine
- Faizon Love as Cellmate
- David Warner as Barclay (James' Boss)

== Production ==
When the original director left the film Chris Tucker recommended Brett Ratner, having previously worked with him on a music video. The film marks the feature film directing debut of Ratner and the start of several collaborations with Tucker.

== Soundtrack ==
Year	Title	Chart positions		Certifications (sales thresholds)
Year	Title	U.S.	U.S. R&B	Certifications (sales thresholds)
1997	Money Talks: Released: August 12, 1997; Label: Arista	37	6	US: Gold

== Reception ==
=== Box office ===
The film debuted at No. 2 behind G.I. Jane, grossing $10.6 million at the box office. In its second weekend, Money Talks held the number-two spot with $9.4 million. It went on to gross $48.4 million worldwide.

=== Critical response ===
On Rotten Tomatoes, the film has an approval rating of 19% based on reviews from 21 critics. Audiences surveyed by CinemaScore gave the film an average grade "A" on scale of A+ to F.

Roger Ebert of the Chicago Sun-Times gave the film 3 out of 4 stars, and praised the performance of Chris Tucker: "Tucker, like [Jim] Carrey, comes on as obnoxious and irritating at first, and then you see the smile and the intelligence underneath, and he begins to grow on you". Owen Gleiberman of Entertainment Weekly gave the film a C+ grade writing "Money Talks has been slapped together with all the flair and wit of a bad Damon Wayans comedy. Tucker is teamed with Charlie Sheen as a hapless TV reporter, and these two look very glum together. Yet there's joy amid the tedium".
