= Ross LaManna =

American screenwriter and author

Ross LaManna is an American screenwriter and author. He is best known for creating the Rush Hour series starring Jackie Chan and Chris Tucker.

His first novel, Acid Test, was published in the U.S. and Canada by Ballantine Books. The geopolitical thriller was chosen as an Amazon.com "Penzler Pick" and as The Mysterious Bookshop's selection for "Best First Fiction". It was published in several foreign territories and as an audiobook.

He attended the University of Southern California in Los Angeles, graduating cum laude with a Bachelor of Arts in screenwriting, and also holds a Master of Arts from Arizona State University in dramatic writing.

He began in the entertainment industry working on international legal affairs at the independent studio Embassy Pictures. Columbia Pictures purchased a speculative script he had written while at Embassy, and soon thereafter he was hired by United Artists under a two-picture writing deal. Carolco Pictures later hired him under a unique, two-year "in-house screenwriter" arrangement, where he worked on a number of their projects. He has written original screenplays, adaptations or rewrites for Fox, Disney, Paramount, Columbia, Universal, HBO Films and many independent companies.

He was Chairman of the Undergraduate and Graduate Film Departments at the Art Center College of Design in Pasadena, California from 2011 to 2024. He was also on the Board of Directors for the United States Air Force Entertainment Liaison Office. At Art Center, he brought in a number of notable filmmakers as part-time instructors, including the cinematographer Affonso Beato, ASC, the storyboard artist Tim Burgard, the director/producer Jeremiah Chechik, the cinematographer Allen Daviau, ASC, the screenwriter Doug Eboch, the director David Kellogg, the composer Dennis McCarthy, the title designer Dan Perri, the director/producer Richard Pearce, the entertainment attorney Lee Rosenbaum, the writer/director Bobby Roth, the director/actor Mark Rydell, the producer/director John Suits, the director Ron Underwood and the editor Billy Weber.
