= Jackie Chan discography =

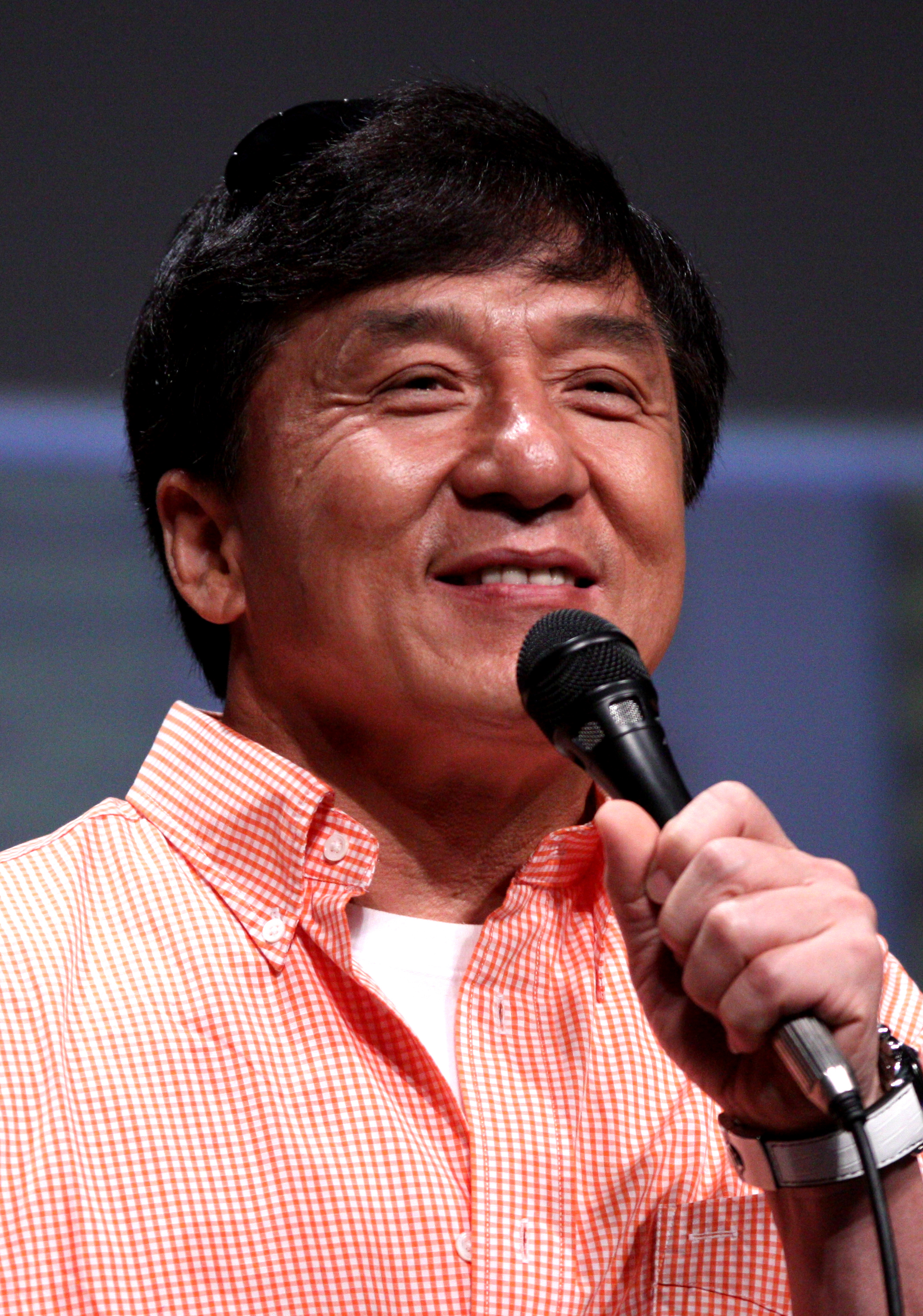
- Chan in 2012
- Studio albums: 12
- Compilation albums: 9

Jackie Chan is a prolific singer who started producing records in the early 80s. He started singing the theme songs over the closing credits of his films in 1980, when the film The Young Master was produced. Chan sang its theme song, titled "Kung Fu Fighting Man" entirely in English. Since then he has produced over 20 different albums, singing over 100 songs in over five languages, and has teamed up with singers such as Emil Chau and the late Anita Mui. His personal achievements also include winning Best Foreign Singer Award in Japan in 1984.

== Studio albums ==
Released	Title	Language	Track listing
1984	Love Me	English; Japanese; Cantonese	1. "Movie Star"; 2. "Jackie's Legend"; 3. "Marianne"; 4. "Let Me Hear Once More"; 5. "Love Me"; 6. "When April Comes"; 7. "Hello Happy Song"; 8. "Wait for Me"
1984	Thank You	Japanese; Cantonese	1. "Marianne" – Canto Version; 2. "Hello Happy Song" – Canto Version; 3. "Project A" – theme 4. "Project A" – Karaoke Version
1985	A Boy's Life	Japanese	1. "Tokyo Saturday Night"; 2. "China Blue"; 3. "Wow Wow Wow"; 4. "Memories of Eagles"; 5. "Try to Love Me"; 6. "I Love You, You, You"; 7. "Platonic Intuition"; 8. "Sleep in My Arms"; 9. "Hong Kong Twilight"; 10. "Rosy Coloured Pupils"
1986	Shangrila	English; Japanese	1. "Love Again (Beach Story)"; 2. "Je t'aime Je t'aime" 3. "Perfect Night for a Slow Dance"; 4. "Just for Tonight"; 5. "Esperance"; 6. "Only for Your Love"; 7. "Don't Stop the Romance"; 8. "Hello From the Back"; 9. "Be Like a Storm" (featuring Anita Mui); 10. "August Carmen"
1986	Sing Lung	Cantonese	1. "My Little Girl"; 2. "I Stop the Heart Pain"; 3. "Iron Man, Soft Feelings"; 4. "Flight of the Dragon"; 5. "Just for Tonight"; 6. "OK I Love You"; 7. "Thousand Times Chained in Feelings" (featuring Anita Mui); 8. "Waan Ngau"; 9. "Life's Fulfillment"; 10. "Hero Story"
1987	No Problem	Japanese; Cantonese	1. "Telephone"; 2. "Stardust Bay Blues"; 3. "The Rain of Jealousy Falls"; 4. "Miss Temptation"; 5. "Giant Feeling"; 6. "No Problem"; 7. "Tears of Jade"; 8. "Maria My Love"; 9. "Dream Ties"
1988	Jackie Chan	Cantonese	1. "Before The Midnight Kiss" (featuring Naoko Kawai); 2. "Stay with Me"; 3. "Giant Feelings"; 4. "Film Cutting Machine of Life"; 5. "New Diary"; 6. "Dare to Fight Against Bans"; 7. "This Night"; 8. "I Can Do It" (featuring Naoko Kawai); 9. "Grow"; 10. "Tender Hearts Sparkle"
1992	First Time	Mandarin; Taiwanese	1. "My Feeling"; 2. "I Wished the Flower Could Never Fade"; 3. "The Reddish Face"; 4. "Keep Your Company Through Every Moment"; 5. "So Transparent Is My Heart" (featuring Sarah Chen); 6. "A Vigorous Aspiration in My Mind"; 7. "The Betel Nuts Beauty"; 8. "You Are a Lover in My Dreams"; 9. "Everyday in My Life" (featuring Tarcy Su); 10. "The End"
1996	Dragon's Heart	Mandarin; Cantonese	1. "How Come"; 2. "Would Rather Say Goodbye in Dreams"; 3. "Red Sun"; 4. "I Know How You Feel"; 5. "Cry With You, Laugh With You"; 6. "In the Cold Rain"; 7. "Let Me Be Your Man"; 8. "I Would Start to Speak but I Can't"; 9. "So Much Love"; 10. "I Love Hong Kong"
2002	With All One's Heart	Mandarin	1. "Truly, With All My Heart"; 2. "Metropolis Shangri-la (featuring Norika Fujiwara); 3. "Staying with You All My Life"; 4. "I Only Care about You (featuring Teresa Teng); 5. "Pocket"; 6. "Dream of the Horizon" (featuring Lee Soo Young); 7. "That's Meaningless"; 8. "As Long as I Loved" (featuring Sammi Cheng); 9. "Offended"; 10. "Clear Conscience in My Heart"; 11. "With all One's Heart"
2008	Official Album for the Beijing 2008 Olympic Games – Jackie Chan's Version	Mandarin	1. "We Are Ready"; 2. " (Zhàn qǐlái chénglóng sūnyànzī wánglìhóng hán hóng)" / "Stand Up" (featuring Stefanie Sun, Han Hong and Leehom Wang); 3. " (Xiāngxìn zìjǐ)" / "Believe in Yourself"; 4. " (Shàonián qiáng)" / "Youth are Strong"; 5. " (Zhōngguó kànjiàn chénglóng tánjīng)" / "China Saw It" (featuring Tan Jing); 6. " (Dǎkāi tiānkōng)" / "Open the Heavens"; 7. " (Shēngsǐ bùlí)" / "Chain of Life and Death"; 8. " (Lóng de mèngxiǎng)" / "Dragon's Dream"; 9. " (Běijīng huānyíng nǐ qúnxīng)" / "Beijing Welcomes You"; 10. " (Shàonián qiáng chénglóng zhōuhuájiàn)" / "Powerful Youngsters" (featuring Emil Chau)
2018	I Am Me (我還是成龍)	Mandarin	1. "Childhood Stories" ("青春故事"); 2. "Wù Shì Rén Fēi" ("物是人非"); 3. "Thank You, My Love" ("謝謝一輩子"); 4. "Love Is Old" ("愛情老了"); 5. "Heartache" ("心痛"); 6. "Crossroads" ("路口"); 7. "Don't Give Up" ("別放棄"); 8. "No Longer Lost" ("不再失去"); 9. "I Haven’t Grown Up Yet" ("還沒長大就老了")

== Compilation albums ==
Released	Name
1988	The Best of Jackie Chan
1988	Hong Kong, My Love
1989	See You Again
1989	Jackie
1990	Pride
1995	Best of Movie Themes
1999	The Best of Jackie Chan
2000	Asian Pop Gold
2005	Jackie Chan Greatest Hits

== Theme songs ==
Chan has performed the theme songs for the following films.

Released	Film	Song Title
1980	The Young Master	"Kung Fu Fighting Man"
1982	Dragon Lord	"龍少爺" / "Dragon Lord"
1983	Project A	"A計劃" / "Project A"
1985	Heart of Dragon	"Tokyo Saturday Night"
1985	Police Story	"英雄故事" / "Hero Story"
1986	Armour of God	"Flight of the Dragon (High Upon High)"
1987	Project A Part II	"A計劃續集" / "Project A 2"
1988	Dragons Forever	"When We Touch" (with Anita Mui)
1988	Police Story 2	"英雄故事" / "Hero Story" "我需要" / "I Need"
1991	Armour of God II: Operation Condor	"The Way of the Condor"
1991	Beauty and the Beast	"Beauty and the Beast" (Chinese Release)
1992	Twin Dragons	"感受" / "My Feeling"
1992	Once Upon a Time in China II	"男兒當自強" / "A Man Should Better Himself" (version of the Wong Fei-Hung theme)
1992	Police Story 3: Super Cop	"謎" / "The Riddle" (Mandarin) "我有我路向" / "I Have My Path" (Cantonese)
1993	City Hunter	"城市獵人" / "City Hunter"
1994	Drunken Master II	"醉拳" / Drunken Boxing"
1995	Thunderbolt	"一分鐘英雄" / "One Moment's Hero"
1995	Rumble in the Bronx	"問心無愧" / "A Good Conscience" (Mandarin) "對得起自己" / "Be Worthy of Yourself" (Cantonese)
1996	Police Story 4: First Strike	"怎么会" / "How Come?" "英雄故事" / "Hero Story" (Remix)
1997	Mr. Nice Guy	"一個好人" / "A Nice Guy" (Cantonese) "自我挑戰" / "Challenge Yourself" (Mandarin) "愛了就算" / "As Long as I Loved"
1997	Last Tango in Shanghai (TV series)	"午夜舞影" / "Midnight Dance"
1998	Who Am I?	"我是誰" / "Who Am I?" (with Emil Chau)
1998	Mulan	"男子汉" / "I'll Make a Man Out of You" (Chinese Release)
1998	Rush Hour	"Less than an Hour"
2001	The Accidental Spy	"身不由己" / "Out of Control" (with Mavis Fan)
2003	The Twins Effect	"变变变" / "Bian Bian Bian" (with Twins)
2004	New Police Story	"九月風暴" / "September Storm"
2005	The Myth	"無盡的愛" / "Endless Love" (with Kim Hee-sun)
2006	Rob-B-Hood	"爸媽的話" / "Father and Mother's Words"
2008	The One Man Olympics	"站起来" / "Stand Up" (with Leehom Wang, Stefanie Sun and Han Hong)
2010	Little Big Soldier	"油菜花" / "Canola Flower"
2012	Chinese Zodiac	"妙手空空" / "Petty Thief/Empty Handed" (with Emil Chau)
2013	Police Story 2013	"拯救" / "Rescue" (with Sun Nan)
2015	Dragon Blade	"不再失去" / "Song of Peace" "大漠英雄" / "Desert Hero" "告诉风沙送爹回家" / "Tell the Wind to Bring my Father Home" (with Wei Yunxi)
2016	Skiptrace	"明明白白我的心" / "Plainly My Heart" (with Sarah Chen)
2016	Railroad Tigers	"Pipa"
2017	Kung Fu Yoga	"美麗的神話" / " Beautiful Myth" "Curry Flavor"
2017	The Foreigner	"普通人 (双人)" / "Ordinary People (Duet Version)" (with Liu Tao) "普通人 (独奏)" / "Ordinary People (Solo Version)"
2017	Bleeding Steel	"英雄故事" / "Hero Story" (2017 Version)
2019	The Knight of Shadows: Between Yin and Yang	"一起笑出来" / "The Lunar Song" (with Cai Xukun) "怪可爱" / "Weird & Cute"
2020	Vanguard	"壮志在我胸2020" / "Ambition in My Chest 2020"
2024	A Legend	"傳說" / "A Legend" (with LAY and Kim-hee-soon)

== Other songs ==
Chan has also performed on the following songs.

Released	Recorded for	Song Title
2008	2008 Summer Olympics closing ceremony	"Hard to Say Goodbye" (with Andy Lau, Liu Huan and Emil Chau)
2009	Expo 2010	"City" (with Lang Lang and Yao Ming)
2020	COVID-19 Jackie Chan and Marco Arturo B	"坚信爱会赢" (with Xiao Zhan, Wang Leehom, Tian Tong, Li Guangjie, Wu Jing, Shen Teng, Song Jia, Yang Pei-An, Zhang Lei, Chen Jianbin, Lin Yongjian, Tong Liya, Hai Xia, Huang Xiaoming, Nan Shu, Lei Jia and Tan Weiwei)
