= Junpei Morita =

Japanese actor (born 1954)

- 森田 順平
- Born: August 1, 1954 (age 72); Fukuoka Prefecture, Japan
- Occupations: Actor; voice actor
- Years active: 1977–present
- Agent: Mausu Promotion

Junpei Morita (森田 順平, Morita Junpei; born August 1, 1954) is a Japanese actor and voice actor affiliated with Mausu Promotion. Some of his major roles include Ryuzo in Cybuster, Dr. White in Black Jack 21, Nagato in Naruto: Shippuden, and BUER in Pandora in the Crimson Shell: Ghost Urn.

== Filmography ==
=== Anime ===
List of voice performances in anime
Year	Title	Role	Notes	Source
1999	Cybuster	Ryuzo Ando		
1999	Kyoro-chan	Guruguri warrior / Kaito Giroush / Shibasiba グリグリ警部 / 怪盗ギロッシュ / シバシバ		
1999	Wild Arms: Twilight Venom	Kiel Aronnax		
2000	Ghost Stories	Momoko's father		
2001	Kasumin ja:カスミン	Dragon King 龍王		
2002	Naruto	Hoki		
2002	Shinseikiden Mars ja:神世紀伝マーズ	hopper ホッパー		
2003	Uninhabited Planet Survive!	Brindo		
2004	Le Portrait de Petit Cossette	Yutaka Enokido	OVA ep. 1	
2005	Eureka Seven	Neal		
2005	Tide-Line Blue	Blantyre		
2006	Black Jack 21	Dr. White		
2006	The Wallflower	Ranmaru's father		
2007	Deltora Quest	Joker		
2008	Golgo 13	Thomas Simpson		
2009	Naruto: Shippuden	Nagato		
2013	Space Battleship Yamato 2199	Ancient Tsuyoshi, Hydom Gimray 古代剛 / ハイドム・ギムレー		
2013	Odoriko Clinoppe ja:踊り子クリノッペ	Nanchobie Mazda ナンチョビー・マツダ		
2013	Rozen Maiden	Megu's father		
2013	Magi: The Kingdom of Magic	Solomon ソロモン		
2015	Classroom Crisis	Jason Lee ジェイソン・リー		
2015	Lupin the Third	Leopoldo Fargo レオポルド・ファーゴ	series 4	
2015	Crayon Shin-chan	Enchou-sensei	replaces Rokuro Naya	
2016	Pandora in the Crimson Shell: Ghost Urn	Buer ブエル	Eps. 2-12	
2018	Hugtto! PreCure	George Cry ジョージ クライ		
2021	Fairy Ranmaru	Hо̄jо̄ Amamori		
2021	The World's Finest Assassin Gets Reincarnated in Another World as an Aristocrat	Assassin		
2025	Miru: Paths to My Future	Mario's grandfather		

=== Film ===
List of voice performances in film
Year	Title	Role	Notes	Source
2000	Mobile Suit Gundam I	Gene	Mobile Suit Gundam Special Edition	
2002	WXIII: Patlabor the Movie 3	Goro Ishihara		
2003	Boku no Son Goku ja:ぼくの孫悟空	Mr. Sanzo 三蔵法師		
2015	Harmony	Nuada Kirie		
2016	Crayon Shin-chan: Fast Asleep! Dreaming World Big Assault!	Director 園長先生		

=== Video games ===
List of voice performances in video games
Year	Title	Role	Notes	Source
2004	3 Years Set up at teacher 's legendary teacher K Bank K - 8! ja:3年B組金八先生 伝説の教壇に立て！	Takamine 高峰通	PS1 / PS2	
2005	My family ja:ぼくらのかぞく	Arakawa Wataru 荒川渡	PS1 / PS2	
2005	Mobile Suit Gundam One Year War ja:機動戦士ガンダム 一年戦争	A gene ジーン	PS1 / PS2	
2006	Ace Combat Zero: The Belkan War	Weaker ウィーカー	PS 1 / PS 2	
2006	Hilarious sunset ja:あでやかな落日	Hiraishi Spring and Autumn 平石春秋	radio	
2007	Crisis Core: Final Fantasy VII	Lazard		
2008	428: Shibuya Scramble	Changi Agent チャンギエージェント	Wii	
2008	Fallout 3	James	PS3, Xbox 360; English voice for Liam Neeson	
2009	Lost Horizon ja:失われた地平線	Hugh Conway ヒュー・コンウェイ	radio	
2011	Gashira! ~ Rampage Teacher in High School ~ ja:ガチトラ！ ～暴れん坊教師 in High School～	Satoru Fujioka 藤岡悟	PSP	
2012	Assassin's Creed III	Charles Lee	PS3, Xbox 360	
2013	Shin Megami Tensei IV	Fujiwara フジワラ	3DS	
2013	Metro: Last Light	Resnisky	PS3, Xbox 360	
2014	Naruto Shippuden: Ultimate Ninja Storm Revolution	Nagato	PS3, Xbox 360	
2014	Ciel Nosurge: Offline	Lieveld リーヴェルト	Other	
2016	Naruto Shippuden: Ultimate Ninja Storm 4	Nagato		
2016	Shin Megami Tensei IV: Apocalypse	Fujiwara フジワラ	3DS	
2016	Yakuza 6	Big Lo ビッグ・ロウ	PS4	
2017	Tiny Metal	President of Artemisia		
2018	Judgement	Kunihiko Morita 森田 邦彦	PS4	
2020	The Last of Us Part II	Jerry		
2022	Crisis Core: Final Fantasy VII Reunion	Lazard		

=== Tokusatsu ===
List of voice performances in tokusatsu
Year	Title	Role	Notes	Source
2006	GoGo Sentai Boukenger	Creator King Ryuuwon	Eps. 2, 4, 7, 10, 11, 13, 15, 16, 21, 25, 27, 29, 33, 34, 37, 41, 42 & 45-47	
2008	Engine Sentai Go-onger	Savage Land Water Sky Special Barbaric Machine Beast Kagami Banki	Ep. 10	
2010	Tensou Sentai Goseiger	Yuumajuu Uobouzu of the Nessie	Ep. 21 & 22	
2011	Kaizoku Sentai Gokaiger	Creator King Ryuuwon	Ep. 21	
2014	Ressha Sentai ToQger	Chain Shadow	Ep. 3	

=== Dubbing roles ===
==== Live-action ====
Title	Role	Voice dub for	Notes	Source
Mickey Blue Eyes	Michael Felgate	Hugh Grant		
Bridget Jones's Diary	Daniel Cleaver	Hugh Grant		
About a Boy	Will Freeman	Hugh Grant		
Love Actually	David	Hugh Grant		
Bridget Jones: The Edge of Reason	Daniel Cleaver	Hugh Grant		
American Dreamz	Martin "Tweedy" Tweed	Hugh Grant		
Did You Hear About the Morgans?	Paul Morgan	Hugh Grant		
The Man from U.N.C.L.E.	Alexander Waverly	Hugh Grant		
Florence Foster Jenkins	St. Clair Bayfield	Hugh Grant		
A Very English Scandal	Jeremy Thorpe	Hugh Grant		
The Gentlemen	Fletcher	Hugh Grant		
The Undoing	Jonathan Fraser	Hugh Grant		
Glass Onion: A Knives Out Mystery	Phillip	Hugh Grant		
Dungeons & Dragons: Honor Among Thieves	Forge Fitzwilliam the Rogue	Hugh Grant		
Operation Fortune: Ruse de Guerre	Greg	Hugh Grant		
Heretic	Mr. Reed	Hugh Grant		
Contact	Palmer Joss	Matthew McConaughey		
Amistad	Roger Sherman Baldwin	Matthew McConaughey		
The Newton Boys	Willis Newton	Matthew McConaughey		
U-571	Andrew Tyler	Matthew McConaughey		
Frailty	Fenton Meiks	Matthew McConaughey		
How to Lose a Guy in 10 Days	Benjamin Barry	Matthew McConaughey		
Two for the Money	Brandon Lang	Matthew McConaughey		
Failure to Launch	Tripp	Matthew McConaughey		
The Wolf of Wall Street	Mark Hanna	Matthew McConaughey		
True Detective	Detective Rust Cohle	Matthew McConaughey		
Tinker Tailor Soldier Spy	Bill Haydon	Colin Firth		
Gambit	Harry Deane	Colin Firth		
Devil's Knot	Ron Lax	Colin Firth		
Magic in the Moonlight	Stanley Crawford	Colin Firth		
Kingsman: The Secret Service	Harry Hart / Galahad	Colin Firth		
Kingsman: The Golden Circle	Harry Hart / Galahad	Colin Firth		
Mary Poppins Returns	William "Weatherall" Wilkins	Colin Firth		
1917	General Erinmore	Colin Firth		
Operation Mincemeat	Ewen Montagu	Colin Firth		
The Staircase	Michael Peterson	Colin Firth		
Sherlock Holmes: A Game of Shadows	James Moriarty	Jared Harris		
The Mortal Instruments: City of Bones	Hodge Starkweather	Jared Harris		
The Crown	King George VI	Jared Harris		
Chernobyl	Valery Legasov	Jared Harris		
Unfaithful	Edward Sumner	Richard Gere		
Arbitrage	Robert Miller	Richard Gere		
MotherFatherSon	Max Finch	Richard Gere		
Alien: The Director's Cut	Kane	John Hurt		
A Better Tomorrow	Inspector Wu	John Woo		
Beyond the Sea	Bobby Darin	Kevin Spacey		
Black Swan	Thomas Leroy	Vincent Cassel		
Blade II	Jared Nomak	Luke Goss		
The Bourne Legacy	Eric Byer	Edward Norton		
The Bridge on the River Kwai	Major Clipton	James Donald		
The Bridges of Madison County	Michael Johnson	Victor Slezak		
Casablanca	Victor Laszlo	Paul Henreid	2013 Star Channel edition	
City of Angels	Jordan Ferris	Colm Feore		
The Company	Choreographer #2	Robert Desrosiers		
The Count of Monte Cristo	Fernand Mondego	Guy Pearce		
Criminal Minds	Aaron Hotchner	Thomas Gibson		
Dawn of the Dead	Stephen "Flyboy" Andrews	David Emge	2010 DVD edition	
Dawn of the Dead	Michael	Jake Weber		
Doomsday	John Hatcher	Alexander Siddig		
Draft Day	Sonny Weaver Jr.	Kevin Costner		
Erin Brockovich	Kurt Potter	Peter Coyote		
Firestorm	To Shing-bong	Gordon Lam		
Frasier	Frasier Crane	Kelsey Grammer		
Friends	Gavin Mitchell	Dermot Mulroney		
The Game	Conrad van Orton	Sean Penn		
The Gingerbread Man	Rick Magruder	Kenneth Branagh		
The Golden Child	Sardo Numspa	Charles Dance	On-demand edition	
Gordon Ramsay: Uncharted	Gordon Ramsay			
The Guardian	Ben Randall	Kevin Costner		
Helix	Dr. Alan Farragut	Billy Campbell		
A Hidden Life	Captain Herder	Matthias Schoenaerts		
The Hobbit: The Desolation of Smaug	Thranduil	Lee Pace		
The Hobbit: The Battle of the Five Armies	Thranduil	Lee Pace		
The Holiday	Ethan	Edward Burns		
Hollywood Homicide	Bernard "Bennie" Macko	Bruce Greenwood		
I, Robot	Lawrence Robertson	Bruce Greenwood		
Impact Point	Detective Adams	Linden Ashby		
Infernal Affairs	Lau Kin-ming	Andy Lau / Edison Chen		
Infernal Affairs III	Lau Kin-ming	Andy Lau		
Interview with the Vampire	Lestat de Lioncourt	Tom Cruise	2000 TV Tokyo edition	
Jason Bourne	Edwin Russell	Scott Shepherd	2022 BS Tokyo edition	
Jesus Revolution	Chuck Smith	Kelsey Grammer		
Law Abiding Citizen	Clyde Alexander Shelton	Gerard Butler		
The Legend of Zorro	Count Armand	Rufus Sewell		
The Majestic	Peter Appleton	Jim Carrey		
The Man from Laramie	Will Lockhart	James Stewart	DVD edition	
Meet the Spartans	Captain	Kevin Sorbo		
Michel Vaillant	Jean-Pierre Vaillant	Philippe Bas		
A Midsummer Night's Dream	Oberon	Rupert Everett		
The Monuments Men	2nd Lt. Jean-Claude Clermont	Jean Dujardin		
Mrs. America	Fred Schlafly	John Slattery		
Ocean's Twelve	Baron François Toulour	Vincent Cassel	2007 NTV edition	
Octopus	Capt. Jack Shaw	David Beecroft		
Octopussy	Kamal Khan	Louis Jourdan	2006 DVD edition	
Old Dogs	Charlie Reed	John Travolta		
Palm Springs	Howard Wilder	Peter Gallagher		
Pirates of the Caribbean: The Curse of the Black Pearl	James Norrington	Jack Davenport		
Pirates of the Caribbean: Dead Man's Chest	James Norrington	Jack Davenport		
Platoon	Sergeant Elias	Willem Dafoe	2003 TV Tokyo edition	
Police Story	Superintendent Raymond Li	Lam Kwok-Hung	2012 Ultimate Blu-Ray edition	
Police Story 2	Superintendent Raymond Li	Lam Kwok-Hung	2010 Blu-Ray edition	
Proven Innocent	Gore Bellows	Kelsey Grammer		
Real Steel	Ricky	Kevin Durand		
Red Election	William Ogilvy	Stephen Dillane		
Rumor Has It...	Jeff Daly	Mark Ruffalo		
The Scorpion King	Memnon	Steven Brand		
Shock Wave	Cheung Choi-san	Andy Lau		
Showtime	Cesar Vargas	Pedro Damián		
Thirteen Days	Robert F. Kennedy	Steven Culp		
The Towering Inferno	Senator Gary Parker	Robert Vaughn	2013 BS Japan edition	
The Tuxedo	Clark Devlin / Brad Dillford	Jason Isaacs		
Unstoppable	Ned Oldham	Lew Temple		
Vanilla Sky	Brian Shelby	Jason Lee		
Wanted	Cross	Thomas Kretschmann	2019 BS Japan edition	
The Water Horse: Legend of the Deep	Thomas Hamilton	David Morrissey		
Wild Hogs	Woody Stevens	John Travolta		
X-Men: First Class	John F. Kennedy	Archival footage		
Yogi Bear	Ranger Smith	Tom Cavanagh		

==== Animation ====
Year	Title	Role	Notes	Source
2007	Ratatouille	Talon		
2011	Cars 2	David Hobbscap		
2011	The Adventures of Tintin: The Secret of the Unicorn	Red Rackham		
2013	Planes	Ripslinger		
2014	Big Hero 6	Alistair Krei		
2026	The Cat in the Hat	Waffles		
