= Police Story (film series) =

Hong Kong action film series

Police Story 警察故事系列
- Hong Kong Blu-ray box set for the first three Police Story films

Chinese name
- Traditional Chinese: 警察故事系列
- Simplified Chinese: 警察故事系列
Transcriptions
Standard Mandarin
- Hanyu Pinyin: Jǐngchá Gùshì Xì Liè
Yue: Cantonese
- Jyutping: Ging²caat³ Gu³si⁶ Hai⁶ Lit⁶
- Directed by: Jackie Chan (I, II); Stanley Tong (Police Story 3: Supercop, First Strike, Supercop 2); Benny Chan (New); Ding Sheng (2013); Nicholas Tse (New II)
- Written by: Jackie Chan (I, II); Edward Tang (I-III); Ma Fibe; Yee Lee-Wai (Police Story 3: Supercop); Stanley Tong (First Strike, Supercop 2); Elliot Tong; Greg Mellott; Nick Tramontane (First Strike); Alan Yuen (New); Ding Sheng (2013); Kin-Hung Chan (New II); Sandy Shaw (Supercop 2)
- Produced by: Raymond Chow (I, II); Leonard Ho (I-III); Jackie Chan (Police Story 3: Supercop, New II); Barbie Tung (First Strike, New, Supercop 2); Willie Chan (Police Story 3: Supercop, New); Solon So (New); Yang Du (2013)
- Starring: Jackie Chan
- Cinematography: List: Cheung Yiu-Cho (I, II) Danny Lee Yau Tong (II) Ardy Lam (Police Story 3: Supercop, Supercop 2) Jingle Ma (First Strike) Anthony Pun (New) Yu Ding (2013)
- Edited by: List: Peter Cheung (I-IV, Supercop 2) Cheung Ka-Fai (Police Story 3: Supercop, Supercop 2) Yau Chi-Wai (First Strike, New) Ding Sheng (2013)
- Music by: List: Michael Lai Kevin Bassinson (I, export version) Tang Siu-Lam (I, II) Mac Chew Jenny Chinn Jonathan Lee Joel McNeely (Police Story 3: Supercop) Nathan Wang J. Peter Robinson (First Strike) Tommy Wai (New) Zai Lao (2013) Richard Lo (Supercop 2)
- Distributed by: Hong Kong: Golden Harvest Media Asia Golden Way Films Co. Ltd. Dimension Films New Line Cinema JCE Movies Limited Emperor Motion Pictures China Film Group Corporation Fortune Star Media Ltd. Miramax Warner Bros
- Running time: 743 minutes (combined)
- Country: Hong Kong
- Languages: Cantonese: (I, II, III, First Strike, New, Supercop 2); Mandarin: (2013); English: (Supercop, First Strike, New)
- Box office: US$265 million (est.)

Police Story (Chinese: 警察故事系列) is a Hong Kong action film series created by and starring Jackie Chan. It comprises seven films, variously directed by Jackie Chan, Stanley Tong, Benny Chan, and Ding Sheng, and produced by Raymond Chow, Leonard Ho, Jackie Chan, Barbie Tung, Willie Chan, Solon So and Yang Du. The first film Police Story was released on 14 December 1985. The film's success led to three sequels, one spin-off (Supercop 2), and two reboots (New Police Story and Police Story 2013).

Chan began work on the film after a disappointing experience working with director James Glickenhaus on The Protector, which was intended to be his entry into the American film market. The first Police Story film is considered by fans to be one of Chan's best films. It was a massive hit in Asia. According to his autobiography, I Am Jackie Chan, Chan considers the film his best, in terms of action and stunts. The first three Police Story films were voted among the best action films of all time in Time Out's poll of film critics, directors, actors, and stunt actors, with Police Story ranked 5th, Police Story 2 ranked 61st, and Police Story 3: Supercop ranked 75th.

== Films ==
All of the Police Story films were produced by Raymond Chow, Leonard Ho, Jackie Chan, Barbie Tung, Willie Chan, Solon So and Yang Du, distributed by Golden Harvest, Media Asia, Golden Way Films Co. Ltd., Fortune Star Media Ltd., and JCE Movies. They were all directed by Jackie Chan, Stanley Tong, Benny Chan and Ding Sheng.

=== Police Story (1985) ===
Police Story (Chinese: 警察故事) was made in 1985. The Royal Hong Kong Police Force is planning a major undercover sting called "Operation Boar Hunt" to arrest crime lord Chu Tao (Chor Yuen). Inspector Chan Ka-Kui (or Kevin Chan in some versions) is part of the operation, along with undercover officers stationed in a shanty town. After arresting Chu, Chan's next assignment is to protect Chu Tao's secretary, Selina Fong (Brigitte Lin), who plans to testify in court about Chu Tao's illegal activities. The trial fails due to Selina's tampering with evidence. Though Chu Tao is released on bail, he wants revenge against Ka-Kui, framing him for the murder of fellow policeman Inspector Man. Meanwhile, Selina, realizing Chu's criminality, goes to his office at a shopping mall to download incriminating data from Chu Tao's computer system. Chu Tao and Chan notice this and head to the mall. In the ensuing fight, Ka-Kui defeats all of Chu Tao's henchmen while the police apprehend Chu and the briefcase.

=== Police Story 2 (1988) ===
Police Story 2 (Chinese: 警察故事續集), made in 1988, featured many of the same actors reprising their roles from the original. The story picks up with Chan Ka-Kui being demoted to a traffic cop for causing so much damage in his apprehension of Chu. Chu has been released from prison on the pretense that he is terminally ill, and Chu and his clan continue to harass Chan and his girlfriend May as Chan gets reinstated to the detective unit when criminal bombers begin extorting money from businessmen. The film marks the last appearance of Lam Kwok-Hung as Superintendent Raymond Li.

=== Police Story 3: Supercop (1992) ===
Police Story 3: Supercop (Chinese: 警察故事3超級警察), also known as Supercop, was made in 1992. Michelle Yeoh joins the cast, portraying a police officer from mainland China. The story involves Chan and Yeoh's character going undercover to try to break up a drug smuggling ring. The action moves from China to Kuala Lumpur, where Chan's girlfriend May is kidnapped. The film marks the last appearance of Maggie Cheung as May. Michelle Yeoh reprises her role in the spin-off, called Supercop 2. Dimension Films released Supercop in the US in 1996 with some edits to the film, the complete replacement of all music and sound effects, and English dubbing.

=== Supercop 2 (1993) ===
Supercop 2 (Chinese: 超級計劃, also known as Project S or Once a Cop), made in 1993, is a Hong Kong action film directed by Stanley Tong and starring Michelle Yeoh. It is a spin-off of Jackie Chan's Police Story film series involving the character Yeoh portrayed in Supercop, Inspector Jessica Yang. The film is also known as Project S in original territories and many other titles, including Police Story IV (inaccurately), Police Story 3 Part 2, and Supercop 2 (US).

Both Jackie Chan and Bill Tung have cameo appearances as Inspector Chan Ka-Kui and "Uncle" Bill Wong in the film. Although Jackie Chan only has a cameo appearance, some DVD covers prominently featured Chan, misleading audiences to think that he was one of the main characters. He reprises his role as Inspector Chan, but in drag to catch a criminal in drag wearing the same wig and clothes.

=== First Strike (1996) ===
Police Story 4: First Strike (Chinese: 警察故事4之簡單任務), also known as First Strike, Police Story 4, or Jackie Chan's First Strike, was made in 1996 and is the only film in the Police Story series made partially in English. Jackie reprises his role as Chan Ka-Kui (also known in some versions as himself) for the final time as the Hong Kong cop works with Interpol to track down and arrest an illegal weapons dealer. Later Ka-Kui realizes that things are not as simple as they appear and soon finds himself a pawn of an organization posing as Russian intelligence. The action shifts away from Hong Kong and Asia, with a globe trekking espionage plot, lending the film the air of a James Bond adventure. The New Line Cinema release in the US contained various alterations. Filmed on location in Ukraine and Australia, the film also marks the last appearance of Bill Tung, who plays Chan's superior "Uncle" Bill Wong in the series.

=== New Police Story (2004) ===
New Police Story (Chinese: 新警察故事), made in 2004, is a reboot of the Police Story series. Chan portrays a disgraced detective named Chan Kwok-Wing, who accidentally leads his team into a trap from which he is the only survivor. Drowning his guilt in booze, he is eventually assigned a new younger partner who turns out to have his own secrets. However, they must work together if they are to stop the gang who killed Chan's team a year earlier. The film features younger Hong Kong actors such as Nicholas Tse, Charlene Choi, Charlie Yeung and Daniel Wu. The story features a more dramatic focus, taking a darker and more serious tone.

=== Police Story 2013 (2013) ===
Police Story 2013 (Chinese: 警察故事2013), made in 2013, stars Jackie Chan in another reboot of the series. The film is directed by Ding Sheng, who previously helmed Chan's Little Big Soldier. Unlike the previous Police Story films where he portrayed a Hong Kong cop, Jackie portrays a mainland Chinese officer named Zhong Wen. Zhong heads to Wu Bar in search of his estranged daughter, Miao Miao (Jing Tian). He disapproves of Miao's relationship with Wu Jiang (Liu Ye), the nightclub owner. However, Wu, who is looking for the release of a long-time prisoner, takes Zhong, Miao, and a group of strangers hostage. The film was distributed as Police Story: Lockdown in the United States by Well Go USA Entertainment and released in June 2015.

=== Future ===
On 14 March 2023, a sequel to New Police Story, titled New Police Story 2, was announced at the Hong Kong FILMART to be in development, with stars Jackie Chan, Nicholas Tse, Daniel Wu, and Charlene Choi returning. Chan will serve as producer while Tse will make his directorial debut.

== Reception ==
=== Box office performance ===
Film	Year	Gross revenue							
Film	Year	Hong Kong	China	Taiwan	Japan	South Korea (est.)	United States / Canada	France / Germany / Italy (est.)	Other territories (est.)
Police Story	1985	HK$26,626,760	—N/a	NT$20,549,670	¥1,900,000,000	US$1,052,405	—N/a	—N/a	US$1,132,480
Police Story 2	1988	HK$34,151,609	—N/a	NT$16,688,260	¥700,000,000	US$1,049,187	—N/a	—N/a	—N/a
Police Story 3: Supercop	1992	HK$32,609,783	—N/a	NT$64,576,200	¥763,000,000	US$3,710,000	US$16,270,600	US$292,782	US$45,765
Supercop 2	1993	HK$9,337,853	—N/a	—N/a	—N/a	—N/a	—N/a	—N/a	—N/a
First Strike	1996	HK$57,518,794	CN¥112,000,000	NT$47,284,460	¥545,000,000	US$4,220,000	US$15,318,863	US$2,163,657	—N/a
New Police Story	2004	HK$21,109,502	CN¥43,000,000	NT$9,070,000	—N/a	US$2,036,644	—N/a	US$1,719,655	US$2,400,330
Police Story 2013	2013	HK$1,511,904	CN¥534,000,000	—N/a	¥41,004,185	US$841,358	—N/a	—N/a	US$6,472,693
Total regional gross		HK$254,795,969 (US$32,859,515)	CN¥689,000,000 (US$112,152,880)	NT$183,020,070 (US$6,179,770)	¥4,294,004,185 (US$53,722,258)	US$14,439,594	US$31,784,183	US$4,176,094	US$10,051,268
Total worldwide gross		US$265,428,023 (est.)							

=== Critical response ===
Film	Year	Rotten Tomatoes	Metacritic
Police Story	1985	93% (27 reviews)	78/100 (9 reviews)
Police Story 2	1988	84% (19 reviews)	68/100 (7 reviews)
Police Story 3: Supercop	1992	93% (48 reviews)	—N/a
Supercop 2	1993	62% (13 reviews)	—N/a
First Strike	1996	57% (23 reviews)	—N/a
New Police Story	2004	57% (8 reviews)	—N/a
Police Story 2013 – Lockdown	2013	25% (8 reviews)	44/100 (5 reviews)

=== Individual films ===
==== Police Story ====
Jackie Chan's first film featuring Chan as a Hong Kong cop was a blockbuster in Asia, Hong Kong, US and other foreign countries. Chan returned to fame after his first attempt to cross over to Hollywood ended with The Protector becoming a box office bomb. The film grossed HK$26,626,760 in Hong Kong.

==== Police Story 2 ====
Chan's second film in the series was an even bigger hit, grossing HK$34,151,609 in Hong Kong. Although the film was a huge success at the box office, it wasn't as appreciated as its predecessor at the Hong Kong Film Awards and only received one win.

==== Police Story 3: Supercop ====
Supercop is the first in the Police Story series not to be directed by Jackie, with Stanley Tong taking over the helm. It is also the last appearance in the series for Maggie Cheung as Ka-Kui's girlfriend, May. Supercop grossed HK$32,609,783 in its Hong Kong theatrical run. After Chan's North American breakthrough in Rumble in the Bronx, Supercop was released in North America on 25 July 1996. Opening at 1,406 theatres, it grossed US$5,503,176 ($3,914 per screen), on its way to a total gross of US$16,270,600. The North American release by Dimension was well received.

James Berardinelli of website ReelViews wrote: "As is usual in a Chan film, the end credits (which show out-takes of failed stunts) are one of Supercop's highlights. There are more laughs in this hilarious three-minute sequence than in the whole of Kingpin. I can't think of a better reason to stay through the entire movie. Ultimately, the closing montage points out one of the chief differences between Chan's stylized, fast-paced films and those of his American counterparts: this is action with a smile, not a grimace".

In the Washington Post, Richard Harrington said: "Chan seems to have met his soul mate in Khan [Michelle Yeoh], Asia's top female action star. Like Chan, Khan does her own fighting and stunts. Unlike the Hollywood action contingent, Chan and Khan don't rely on cinematic trickery. Theirs are not special effects, just spectacular ones. Connoisseurs will find Chan's helicopter-train chase far riskier, more exciting and more believable than its mates in Mission: Impossible and The Living Daylights".

==== Supercop 2 ====
Supercop 2 was released in Hong Kong on 21 October 1993. In Hong Kong, the film managed to gross HK$9,337,853 (as of 8 November 1993). The film was released to the US nearly three years later and it managed to gross US$16,270,600.

Almar Haflidason of BBC Films said: "While not original, it's a good set-up for an action film. Conflicts of loyalty, moments of terrible realisation, and the facing up to of terrible choices are on offer here, but a muddy script structure and some very weak attempts at comedy hamper the flow of the film as Yeoh is partnered with muppet-like partners".

==== First Strike ====
First Strike was an enormous box office success in Hong Kong, grossing HK$57,518,794 during its theatrical run. It remains Jackie Chan's highest-grossing film in Hong Kong.

The film was released on 10 January 1997 in 1,344 North American theatres, grossing US$5,778,933 ($4,299 per screen) in its opening weekend. Its total North American box office gross was US$15,318,863.

The version of the film released in North American cinemas by New Line was met with mixed critical response. On Rotten Tomatoes it has an approval rating of 57% based on reviews from 23 critics.

Mike LaSalle of the San Francisco Chronicle was among the most enthusiastic of the reviewers: "One of the pleasures of being alive at this period of history is Jackie Chan. There are other pleasures, of course, and other movie pleasures, too. But few things in film today are as reliable as a Jackie Chan movie. Even if the picture is weak, Chan is never disappointing. Watching him in Jackie Chan's First Strike, a brand-new effort opening today, there's no doubt that this is a lovable original and a great popular artist. So this time Chan swims with sharks. He climbs from balcony to balcony on the top floor of a tall hotel building. He even—get this—drops 100 feet from a helicopter into a frozen lake, just as the helicopter explodes".

==== New Police Story ====
New Police Story opened in Hong Kong on 23 September 2004, where it made HK$5,625,746 in its first three days. It ended its run with HK$21 million, making it the fourth highest-grossing domestic release of the year.

The film received a limited release in the United Kingdom on 13 October 2006. In its opening weekend the film grossed GBP $19,332 having been shown in 16 theatres. It ranked No. 21 at the box office and averaged $1,208 per theatre. As of 22 October 2006, New Police Story had grossed a total of GBP $33,404 in its two-week release in the UK.

==== Police Story 2013 ====
Police Story 2013 opened in China on 23 December 2013 and in Hong Kong on 16 January 2014 and was shown on 211,468 screens. It was a box office success, dominating the Chinese box office in the last week of the year, despite mixed reviews.

The film made US$21 million on its first weekend, and US$45 million in its first six days. Police Story 2013 grossed US$94,249,025 worldwide. A public screening of Police Story 2013 was held at the 2013 Beijing International Film Festival in April.

== Awards and nominations ==
=== Police Story ===
- 1986 Hong Kong Film Awards
  - Won: Best Film
  - Won: Best Action Choreography
  - Nominated: Best Director (Jackie Chan)
  - Nominated: Best Actor (Jackie Chan)
  - Nominated: Best Actress (Brigitte Lin)
  - Nominated: Best Cinematography (Cheung Yin-Cho)
  - Nominated: Best Film Editing (Peter Cheung)

=== Police Story 2 ===
- 1989 Hong Kong Film Awards
  - Won: Best Action Choreography

=== Police Story 3: Supercop ===
- 1993 Hong Kong Film Awards
  - Nominated: Best Actor (Jackie Chan)
  - Nominated: Best Action Choreography (Stanley Tong, Tang Tak-Wing, Ailen Sit, Chan Man-Ching, Wong Ming-Sing)
- 1992 Golden Horse Film Festival
  - Won: Best Actor (Jackie Chan)
  - Won: Best Editing (Peter Cheung, Cheung Kar-Fei)

=== First Strike ===
- 1997 Hong Kong Film Awards
  - Won: Best Action Choreography (Stanley Tong)
  - Nominated: Best Picture
  - Nominated: Best Actor (Jackie Chan)
  - Nominated: Best New Performer (Annie Wu)
  - Nominated: Best Film Editing (Peter Cheung, Yau Chi-Wai)
- 1996 Golden Horse Film Festival
  - Won: Best Action Direction (Stanley Tong)
- 1997 MTV Movie Awards
  - Nominated: Best Fight

=== New Police Story ===
- 24th Annual Hong Kong Film Awards
  - Nomination – Best Picture
  - Nomination – Best Director (Benny Chan)
  - Nomination – Best Actor (Jackie Chan)
  - Nomination – Best Supporting Actor (Daniel Wu)
  - Nomination – Best Editing (Yau Chi-Wai)
  - Nomination – Best Action Design (Lee Chung-Chi, Jackie Chan Stunt Team)
  - Nomination – Best Sound Effects (Kinson Tsang Kin-Cheung)
  - Nomination – Best Visual Effects (Wong Won-Tak, Ho Chi-Fai)
- 41st Annual Golden Horse Awards
  - Won – Best Supporting Actor (Daniel Wu)
  - Won – Best Action Choreography (Lee Chung-Chi, Jackie Chan Stunt Team)
  - Won – Best Visual Effects (Victor Wong, Brian Ho)
  - Won – Audience Choice Award
  - Nomination – Best Editing (Yau Chi-Wai)
  - Nomination – Best Art Direction (Wong Ching-Ching, Choo Sung-Pong, Oliver Wong)
  - Nomination – Best Sound Effects (Tsang King-Cheung)

=== Police Story 2013 ===
- 18th Beijing Screenings and China Film Outstanding International Contribution Awards
  - Won – Outstanding International Contribution for a Chinese Film

== Cast and characters ==
The following table shows the cast members who played the characters in the series.

List indicators
- This table shows the characters and the actors who have portrayed them throughout the series
- Some actors are featured in several films but play different characters
- A dark grey cell indicates the character was not in the film
- While New Police Story and Police Story 2013 are part of the Police Story film series, they are not continuations of the original series and are considered reboots
- New Police Story and Police Story 2013 are separate reboots
- Supercop 2 is a spin-off of the Police Story series

Character	Films						
Character	Police Story (1985)	Police Story 2 (1988)	Police Story 3: Supercop (1992)	Supercop 2 (1993)	First Strike (1996)	New Police Story (2004)	Police Story 2013 (2013)
Original Series
Inspector "Kevin" Chan Ka-Kui	Jackie Chan	Jackie Chan	Jackie Chan	Jackie Chan^{C}	Jackie Chan		
Inspector "Uncle" Bill Wong	Bill Tung	Bill Tung	Bill Tung	Bill Tung^{C}	Bill Tung		
May	Maggie Cheung	Maggie Cheung	Maggie Cheung				
Superintendent Raymond Li	Lam Kwok-Hung	Lam Kwok-Hung					
Inspector "Big Mouth" Kim	Mars	Mars					
Inspector Francis Tak	Kent Tong	Kent Tong					
Inspector Paul Wong	Paul Wong	Paul Wong					
Chu Tao	Chor Yuen	Chor Yuen					
John Ko	Charlie Cho	Charlie Cho					
Danny Chu Ko	Fung Hak-On						
Selina Fong	Brigitte Lin						
Inspector Man	Kam Hing-Yin						
"Snake Eyes" Lee	Tai Bo	Tai Bo					
Counsellor Cheung	Lau Chi-Wing						
Dummy/Deaf Criminal		Benny Lai					
President Fung		Kwan Shan					
Miss Wong		Isabella Wong					
Inspector Jessica Yang			Michelle Yeoh	Michelle Yeoh			
Panther			Yuen Wah				
Khun Chaibat			Kenneth Tsang				
Chen Wen-Shi Chaibat			Josephine Koo				
David Chang Fung				Yu Rongguang			
Inspector Martin Lee Kwong-Ming				Emil Chau			
Annie Tsui					Annie Wu		
Jackson Tsui					Jackson Liu		
Colonel Gregor Yegorov					Yuri Petrov		
Natasha					Nonna Grishayeva		
Mark					John Eaves		
Uncle Seven					Terry Woo		
Allen					Ailen Sit		
Reboot Series
Senior Inspector Chan Kwok-Wing						Jackie Chan	
Detective Frank Cheng Siu-Fung						Nicholas Tse	
Sun Ho-Yee						Charlie Yeung	
Officer Sa Sa						Charlene Choi	
Joe Kwan						Daniel Wu	
Commander Chiu Chan						Yu Rongguang	
Detective Zhong Wen							Jackie Chan
Miao Miao							Jing Tian
Wu Jiang							Liu Ye
Captain Wu							Yu Rongguang

== Theme songs ==
Chan has performed the theme songs for the following Police Story films.

Released	Film	Song Title
1985	Police Story	"英雄故事" / "Hero Story"
1988	Police Story 2	"英雄故事" / "Hero Story" "我要衝霄" / "I Need"
1992	Police Story 3: Supercop	"謎" / "The Riddle" (Mandarin) "希望你會懂" / "I Hope You Will Understand" (Mandarin) "我有我路向" / "I Have My Path" (Cantonese)
1996	First Strike	"怎么会" / "How Come?" "英雄故事" / "Hero Story" (Remix)
2004	New Police Story	"九月風暴" / "September Storm"
2013	Police Story 2013	"拯救" / "Rescue" (with Sun Nan)

== Related films ==
Crime Story, though not officially part of the franchise, was released under the title 新ポリス・ストーリー, Shin Porisu Sutōrī (lit. New Police Story) in Japan, promoting it as a Reboot of the Film Series, even despite 1st Official Reboot of the Series would came 11 years later.

Mr. Nice Guy (1997) was originally going to be the fifth film in the Police Story series, with its setting in Sydney, Australia, but in a month's time it was revised to become a stand-alone action film set in Melbourne.

Bleeding Steel (Chinese: 機器之血) (2017), though not officially part of the franchise, was released under the title ポリス・ストーリー REBORN, Porisu Sutōrī Ribon (lit. Police Story Reborn) in Japan and even used an updated version of the Police Story title song once again sung by Jackie Chan in the end credits.
