= Supercop =

1992 Hong Kong film by Stanley Tong

Police Story 3: Supercop
- Film poster

Chinese name
- Traditional Chinese: 警察故事3超級警察
- Simplified Chinese: 警察故事3超级警察
Transcriptions
Standard Mandarin
- Hanyu Pinyin: Jǐngchá Gùshì Sān Chāojí Jǐngchá
Yue: Cantonese
- Jyutping: Ging2 Chaat3 Gu3 Si6 Saam1 Ciu1 Kap1 Ging2 Chaat3
- Directed by: Stanley Tong
- Written by: Edward Tang; Ma Fibe; Yee Lee Wai
- Produced by: Willie Chan; Edward Tang; Jackie Chan; Leonard Ho
- Starring: Jackie Chan; Michelle Yeoh; Maggie Cheung; Ken Tsang; Yuen Wah; Bill Tung; Josephine Koo; Wong Siu
- Cinematography: Ardy Lam
- Edited by: Cheung Ka-Fai; Peter Cheung
- Music by: Mac Chew; Jenny Chinn; Richard Lo; Jonathan Lee; Joel McNeely (U.S)
- Distributed by: Media Asia; Golden Harvest; Golden Way Films Co. Ltd. Dimension Films; Miramax (U.S)
- Release date: 4 July 1992
- Running time: 95 minutes 91 minutes (U.S)
- Country: Hong Kong
- Languages: Cantonese; Mandarin; English; Malay
- Budget: $900,000
- Box office: US$34.4 million (est.)

Police Story 3: Supercop (Chinese: 警察故事３超級警察; Cantonese Yale: gíng chaat gu sih sāam: Chīu kāp gíng chaat), released as Supercop in the United States and also known as Jackie Chan's Supercop, is a 1992 Hong Kong action film directed by Stanley Tong. It is the third installment in the Police Story series, with Jackie Chan, Maggie Cheung and Bill Tung reprising their roles from the first two films, and Michelle Yeoh introduced as a new co-lead alongside Chan.

In Supercop, series protagonist Chan Ka-kui (Chan) is selected as Hong Kong's "supercop" to work undercover with elite Chinese policewoman Jessica Yang (Yeoh) and take down a drug cartel. It is the last film in the series to feature Cheung, and the first not directed by Chan, although he returns as action director and is now also a producer.

Chan, Tung and Tong would return for the direct sequel First Strike (1996), which would conclude the original series before two reboots in 2004 and 2013; Yeoh would also receive her own spin-off film Supercop 2 in 1993, again directed by Tong.

== Plot ==
Ka-Kui is the "supercop" of the Hong Kong police with amazing martial arts skills. He is sent to Guangzhou, where the Chinese police force's Interpol director, Superintendent Jessica Yang, briefs him on his next assignment. The target is Chaibat, a drug lord based in Hong Kong. To infiltrate Chaibat's organization, Ka-Kui must get close to Panther, Chaibat's henchman, who is being held in a Chinese prison camp. Ka-Kui, posing as a fellow prisoner, aids Panther's escape. A grateful Panther invites Ka-Kui to go with him to Hong Kong and join Chaibat's gang. Panther meets up with some of his other men, and vouches for Ka-Kui. The group heads for Hong Kong.

On the way, they pass through Ka-Kui's supposed home village, and Panther insists that Ka-Kui visit his family there. He does not actually know anyone in the village, but is pleasantly relieved to be greeted by undercover police posing as his family, with Yang as his sister. After a confrontation with local police - who are unaware of the undercover operation - in a restaurant, Ka-Kui and Yang (who is also a skilled martial-artist) escape after a big fight, which concludes with Yang faking the killing of a policeman. This secures Panther's trust in the pair.

In Hong Kong, Chaibat welcomes Ka-Kui and Yang to his luxurious hide-out. He takes them with him to a big opium grower's fortified compound in the Golden Triangle in Thailand, for a meeting of big-time heroin traffickers. During the meeting, Chaibat's gang attack from outside while Ka-Kui and Yang protect him inside. In a huge gun battle, Chaibat's gang kill the rival traffickers and their guards, and smash up the compound. The grower survives, but will now sell only to Chaibat at Chaibat's price.

In Kuala Lumpur, Malaysia, Chaibat's wife, Chen Wen-Shi, is sentenced to death for drug trafficking. Chaibat needs to get her out of prison, as only she knows the codes to his Swiss bank account, and will not reveal them unless freed. Chaibat brings his gang, now including Ka-Kui and Yang, to Kuala Lumpur to stage a jailbreak.

A new difficulty arises when Ka-Kui sees his girlfriend May, a tour guide, in Kuala Lumpur leading a party of Hong Kong tourists. After seeing Ka-Kui accompanying Yang at the luxurious hotel where Chaibat's gang are staying, May jealously confronts Ka-Kui, nearly blowing his cover. Later, Ka-Kui gets May alone and explains the situation. She manages to prevent him from inadvertently blowing his own cover, but is then overheard recounting the tale to a co-worker by one of Panther's men. Chaibat takes May hostage, and forces Ka-Kui and Yang – their cover now blown – to help free Chen as ransom.

Chen's jailbreak is successful, but May's release turns sour when Chaibat pushes her from his helicopter. May survives, and a furious Ka-Kui and Yang pursue Chaibat and his men over the roads, rooftops (where Ka-Kui and Yang defeat Panther and his partner), and skies of Kuala Lumpur. Atop a moving train, Chaibat is killed when his helicopter collides with a bridge and lands on him. Yang and Ka-Kui recapture Chen, with the trio collectively saving themselves from falling beneath the moving train. Chen decides to tell Yang and Ka-Kui the password to Chaibat's bank account. The two partners argue whether Hong Kong or China will get the money.

== Cast ==
- Jackie Chan as RHKP Inspector "Kevin" Chan Ka-Kui / Chen Chia-Chu / Lin Fu Sheng
- Michelle Yeoh (billed as "Michelle Khan") as Interpol Superintendent based in Beijing "Jessica" Yang Chien-Hua / Hannah Lin / Hua-Nui
- Maggie Cheung as May, Kevin's girlfriend
- Bill Tung as "Uncle" Bill Wong, RHKP Senior Superintendent and Kevin's immediate superior
- Philip Chan as Chief Superintendent of Police (Hong Kong) RHKP Chief Superintendent Y.K. Chen
- Yuen Wah as Panther, Chaibat's top lieutenant
- Kenneth Tsang (as Ken Tsang) as Khun Chaibat, narcotics kingpin in Hong Kong
- Josephine Koo as Chen Wen-Shi, Chaibat's wife
- Lo Lieh (as Lit Law) as Thai General, warlord and Golden Triangle drug supplier
  - Burt Kwouk provided the voice in the English version (uncredited)
- Kelvin Wong (as Wong Siu) as Peter / Pierre, Chaibat's henchman
- Ken Lo (as Lowei Kwong) as one of Chaibat's henchman (uncredited)
- Allen Sit as one of Chaibat's henchman (uncredited)
- Mars as Hsiung, one of Panther's henchman (uncredited)
- Wai Man Tam (as Wei-min Tan) as Scar Chiang, one of Panther's henchman
- Ming-Sing Wong as Chinese Police Chief Coach Wang (uncredited)
- Wai Shum as Drug Lord #1 at Meeting (uncredited)
- Yi-Sheng Han (as Yee Sang Hon) as Drug Lord #2 at Meeting (uncredited)
- Kim Maree Penn as Blonde Gunwoman (uncredited)

== Production ==
A significant aspect of this film is that it was the first Jackie Chan film from Hong Kong to use sync sound, allowing all the actors' voices to be recorded as they spoke on scene, rather than dubbed over by different actors later.

Exterior scenes were filmed in Hong Kong Island, Shanghai and Kuala Lumpur. Interior scenes were shot in Kuala Lumpur.

In one scene of the film, Michelle Yeoh and a crewman were almost killed when she jumped onto a car while Jackie Chan was driving and accidentally slipped off the side. Chan grabbed Yeoh and attempted to lift her back onto the car while a crewman also jumped onto the car to help, but Yeoh slipped from Chan’s grasp and both Yeoh and the crewman fell into incoming traffic, prompting the entire crew to rush to help. Yeoh was almost run over but escaped with only minor injuries, while the crewman was knocked unconscious but recovered a few minutes later. The shot is included in the outtakes of the film.

According to his book I Am Jackie Chan: My Life in Action, Chan dislocated his cheekbone during a stunt scene.

=== Filming locations ===
- Victoria Harbour, Central and Western District, Hong Kong Island, British Hong Kong
- Nanjing Road and The Bund, Shanghai, People's Republic of China
- Sultan Abdul Samad Building, Kuala Lumpur Railway Station, Kuala Lumpur, Klang Valley, Peninsular Malaysia, Malaysia
- Brisbane, Queensland, Australia

=== Dimension version ===
The Dimension Films version, which was distributed theatrically in North America in 1996, was dubbed into American English with the participation of Jackie Chan and Michelle Yeoh.

Among the changes was the addition of a new score composed and conducted by composer Joel McNeely. Tom Jones' rendition of "Kung Fu Fighting" plays over the end credits, followed by a song specially written and performed for the film by the band Devo, entitled "Supercop".

This release was cut by approximately 10 minutes. These cuts include:

- Scenes of the police superiors getting a briefing about drug-related crimes.
- The police superiors discussing a plan to send Jackie Chan's character on an undercover mission.
- A scene where Yeoh tries to teach Chan about Mainland China.
- A longer version of the meeting with Chaibat in which the sexy women lounging about his mansion are revealed as drug addicts.

== Home media ==
The film was given a theatrical and VHS release in the United Kingdom.

=== DVD and Blu-ray releases ===
- In January 2000, Dimension Films released their Supercop version.
- In Hong Kong, the film was initially released by Mega Star Video Distribution (Megastar), and later Deltamac. In 2004, it was re-released by Intercontinental Video Limited (IVL). This version was contained within a Police Story trilogy DVD boxset (Region 0 NTSC). All Hong Kong DVDs contain the original cut.
- In January 2009, the film was re-released in the west by Dragon Dynasty and the Weinstein Company. Although it has the original Hong Kong Cantonese soundtrack, it is cut to fit the visuals of the included Dimension Supercop version. It does not contain any of the scenes specific to the Hong Kong version.
- Hong Kong based company Kam & Ronsom Enterprise released the first three Police Story films on Blu-ray Disc in June 2009.
- In September 2022, Eureka Entertainment released Supercop in the UK as both a stand-alone 1080p Blu-ray release, and as part of a 4K Ultra HD Blu-ray set of the Police Story trilogy. These releases include both the 96 minute Hong Kong theatrical cut and the 91 minute US version, with two audio commentaries on the Hong Kong cut.

== Reception ==
=== Box office ===
Police Story 3 grossed HK$32,609,783 (US$4,212,833) in its Hong Kong theatrical run. In Taiwan, it grossed NT$64,576,200 (US$2,607,187). In Japan, it earned ¥763 million (US$4.82 million) at the box office. In South Korea, it grossed US$3.71 million, adding up to US$17,530,020 grossed in East Asia.

In the United States, the film was screened in 1993 at the Hogg Memorial Auditorium in Austin, Texas, along with the original Police Story, with both films well-received among Austin audiences at the time. After the North American success of Rumble in the Bronx, Police Story 3 received a wide release in North America on 25 July 1996. Opening at 1,406 theatres, it grossed US$5,503,176 ($3,914 per screen), on its way to a total gross of US$16,270,600 from 3.7 million ticket sales.

In France, the film sold 61,402 tickets in 1994, equivalent to an estimated €276,309 (US$328,670) in gross revenue. In Italy, the film sold 2,385 tickets in 1997, equivalent to an estimated €11,925 (US$13,523) in gross revenue. In Spain (released 1999), it sold 61,402 tickets, and 1,100 tickets in Romania, equivalent to an estimated €233,328 (US$248,681) in gross revenue.

Combined, the film grossed an estimated US$34,391,494 (equivalent to $79,000,000 in 2025) from the worldwide box office.

=== Home media ===
In the United States, the home video release grossed US$14,430,000 (equivalent to $29,000,000 in 2025) in video rental revenue during 1997, making it the year's second highest-grossing Dimension rental video (after Scream). This adds up to an estimated US$48,821,494 (equivalent to $112,000,000 in 2025) grossed from the box office and US video rentals.

=== Awards and nominations ===
- 1993 Hong Kong Film Awards
  - Nominated: Best Actor (Jackie Chan)
  - Nominated: Best Action Choreography (Stanley Tong, Tang Tak-wing, Ailen Sit, Chan Man-ching, Wong Ming-sing)
- 1992 Golden Horse Film Festival
  - Won: Best Actor (Jackie Chan)
  - Won: Best Editing (Peter Cheung, Cheung Ka-Fai)

=== Critical reception ===
The North American release by Dimension was well received. The US version of the film holds a rating of 93% on review aggregator Rotten Tomatoes from 55 reviews.

James Berardinelli of website ReelViews wrote: "As is usual in a Chan film, the end credits (which show out-takes of failed stunts) are one of Police Story 3's highlights. There are more laughs in this hilarious three-minute sequence than in the whole of Kingpin. I can't think of a better reason to stay through the entire movie. Ultimately, the closing montage points out one of the chief differences between Chan's stylized, fast-paced films and those of his American counterparts: this is action with a smile, not a grimace".

In the Washington Post, Richard Harrington said: "Chan seems to have met his soul mate in Khan [Yeoh's credited name], Asia's top female action star. Like Chan, Khan does her own fighting and stunts. Unlike the Hollywood action contingent, Chan and Khan don't rely on cinematic trickery. Theirs are not special effects, just spectacular ones. Connoisseurs will find Chan's helicopter-train chase far riskier, more exciting and more believable than its mates in Mission: Impossible and The Living Daylights".

Furthermore, in 2009, director Quentin Tarantino named Police Story 3 as one of his favorite films of the past seventeen years. He said that Supercop features the "greatest stunts ever filmed in any movie ever". In 2016 during a roundtable discussion, when asked which movie scene he would love to save for the last of humanity to see, he named the final scene of the movie as his choice. In 2014, Time Out polled several film critics, directors, actors and stunt actors to list their top action films. Supercop was listed at 75th place on this list.

== Spin-off ==
Michelle Yeoh went on to star in a 1993 spin-off called Supercop 2 or Project S. Though it features a cameo appearance by Jackie Chan and Bill Tung reprises his role as "Uncle" Bill, this film is not a proper part of the Police Story series.

== Popular culture ==
The film inspired two missions in the 2004 videogame Grand Theft Auto: San Andreas, both of which were taken from the film's final scenes. The game's last mission, "End of the Line", in which C.J must chase a firetruck with a red open-top car and catch Sean "Sweet" Johnson, was taken from the scene in which Jackie must chase a van using a red open-top car to catch Jessica Yang (Michelle Yeoh). That mission in turn inspired the final mission of Uncharted: The Lost Legacy, which has a similar design.

The mission "Wrong Side of the Tracks", in which the player must follow a train from a dirt bike, was taken from the scene in which Jessica Yang (Michelle Yeoh) follows the train on a similar dirt bike.

The film briefly appears in a scene in British police comedy film Hot Fuzz in which Danny Butterman sees the film in a supermarket's bargain bin and reads it while Nicholas Angel pursues a shoplifter.

== Music ==
Two songs "I Have My Way" (我有我路向) sung by Jackie Chan and "I Just Want You to Understand" (我只想你懂) sung by Taiwanese musician Jonathan Lee, both lyricized by Hong Kong songwriter James Wong and composed by Lee, are featured as theme songs for the Asian versions of the film.

A soundtrack containing alternative rock and hip hop song was released on 30 July 1996 by Interscope Records. It peaked at #133 on the Billboard 200.

== See also ==
- Hong Kong action cinema
- Jackie Chan filmography
- List of Hong Kong films of 1992
- Yuen Wah filmography
