= Lam Kwok-hung =

Hong Kong actor

Frederick Lam Kwok-hung 林國雄
- Born: 1958; Hong Kong
- Occupation: Actor
- Years active: 1980–1992
- Spouse: Amy Chan (1985–2013)

Chinese name
- Traditional Chinese: 林國雄
- Simplified Chinese: 林国雄
Transcriptions
Standard Mandarin
- Hanyu Pinyin: Lín Guóxióng
Yue: Cantonese
- Jyutping: Lam Gwok Hung

Frederick Lam Kwok-hung (Chinese: 林國雄), is a Hong Kong actor, best known for his role as Superintendent Raymond Li in Jackie Chan's Police Story and Police Story 2.

== Film career ==
Lam started acting in 1980 at the age of 22, in his first film, The Mortal Storm. He became well known after starring in Jackie Chan's action film Police Story as Superintendent Raymond Li, alongside Bill Tung, Maggie Cheung, Brigitte Lin and Chan himself. Lam reprised his role again in the highly successful sequel, Police Story 2, but would not return for further sequels.

Lam's last film and starring role to date was in Lucky Way (1992).

== Personal life ==
In 1985, Lam married Hong Kong actress and Cantopop singer Amy Chan (Chinese: 陳秀雯). They have one son. In 2013, it was confirmed that the couple had split.

== Filmography ==
- The Mortal Storm (1980)
- Lucky Breaks (1981)
- Dangerous Person (1981)
- Challenge of Chasing Girls (1984)
- Police Story (1985) – Superintendent Raymond Li
- Mr. Vampire II (1986) – cameo
- Project A II (1987) – cameo
- Police Story 2 (1988) – Superintendent Raymond Li
- Lucky Way (1992)

== See also ==
- Amy Chan
- Jackie Chan
- Police Story
