= First Strike (1996 film) =

1996 Hong Kong film by Stanley Tong

- Hong Kong theatrical poster

Chinese name
- Traditional Chinese: 警察故事4之簡單任務
- Simplified Chinese: 警察故事4之简单任务
Transcriptions
Standard Mandarin
- Hanyu Pinyin: Jǐngchá Gùshì Sì zhi Jiǎndān Rènwu
Yue: Cantonese
- Jyutping: Ging2 Chaat3 Gu3 Si3 Sei3 Zi1 Gaan2 Daan1 Yam6 Mou6
- Directed by: Stanley Tong
- Screenplay by: Stanley Tong; Nick Tramontane; Greg Mellott; Elliot Tong
- Produced by: Barbie Tung
- Starring: Jackie Chan; Wu Chen-chun; Jackson Lou
- Cinematography: Jingle Ma
- Edited by: Peter Cheung; Yau Chi-wai
- Music by: Nathan Wang (Hong Kong cut); J. Peter Robinson (U.S. cut)
- Production company: Golden Harvest
- Distributed by: Golden Harvest; New Line Cinema; Warner Bros
- Release date: 10 February 1996
- Running time: 110 minutes
- Country: Hong Kong
- Languages: Cantonese; Mandarin; English; Russian; Ukrainian
- Box office: US$53 million (est.)

Police Story 4: First Strike (Chinese: 警察故事4之簡單任務), also known as First Strike or Jackie Chan's First Strike, is a 1996 Hong Kong action film directed and co-written by Stanley Tong, and starring Jackie Chan, Jackson Lou, Annie Wu, Bill Tung, Yuri Petrov, and Nonna Grishayeva. It is the fourth main installment of the Police Story series, and the final film in the series' original timeline before its reboot with 2004's New Police Story.

Chan reprises his role of Hong Kong police officer "Kevin" Chan Ka-Kui; "Jackie", which had been used as the character's nickname in international releases of previous Police Story films, is used for the first time in the original canon as the nickname used for him by non-Chinese language characters. Tung also reprises his supporting role as "Uncle" Bill Wong from previous films, while Tong returns as director after Police Story 3: Supercop and the spin-off Supercop 2. It is the first entry in the series not to be fully set in Hong Kong or mainland China, instead taking Ka-Kui on a journey to Ukraine, Russia, and eventually Australia, in scenes which were shot on location in Crimea, Moscow and Australia (including the Sunshine Coast's Underwater World and Chinatown, and the snow scenes of Falls Creek, Victoria). In First Strike, Ka-Kui works with the CIA to track down and arrest an illegal weapons dealer, but starts to suspect that things are not as they appear and that he might be used as a pawn in a greater scheme.

The film includes snow action scenes featuring skiing and snowmobiles, and an underwater fight scene involving sharks. To advertise First Strike, Chan recorded the song "怎麼會 Zenme Hui" and also made a music video for it, although it is not featured in the American release. The film's original version includes dialogue in English, Cantonese, Mandarin, Ukrainian and Russian; the latter three are all dubbed in English in the North American version.

== Plot ==
Whilst working for the CIA, Jackie is assigned to follow leads of a nuclear smuggling case. One of the tasks the CIA gives him is to watch a woman named Natasha while on a plane from Hong Kong to Crimea and record her movements. Jackie arrives in Simferopol and the CIA, partnered with local Ukrainian Security Service, take over the task of following Natasha. However, the CIA operation almost falls apart when the Ukrainian Strike Force arrest Natasha. However, Jackie spots Natasha being driven away and follows her.

During the chase in Yalta, Jackie discovers that Natasha is working with a partner, who called in the Strike Force to prevent her from being followed. Natasha and her partner are also romantically involved. Jackie decides to follow Natasha's partner to a remote lodge in the Crimean Mountains, and informs the CIA of his location. Natasha's partner is meeting with Russian mafia members who are interested in a nuclear bomb that is in his possession. The criminals eventually spot Jackie and agents of both the Ukrainian Militsiya and the CIA arriving. A gunfight ensues. During it, Natasha's partner is identified as Jackson Tsui, a Chinese-American nuclear scientist with CIA links, suspected of stealing a nuclear warhead.

Jackie finds a briefcase which contained evidence from Tsui. However, while being chased by mafia forces, Jackie loses the briefcase as he falls into frozen waters. The mafia takes the briefcase. While recovering in Russian military hospital, he meets Colonel Gregor Yegorov of the Russian FSB. Jackie goes with him to Moscow and discovers he has been assigned to work with Gregor to solve a similar case involving nuclear weapons being smuggled out of Ukraine. His task is to track Tsui, who disappeared after their last encounter. A Russian submarine smuggles Jackie into Brisbane, Australia.

To find out where Jackson is, Jackie befriends his younger sister Annie, who works at an aquarium doing shark shows. Jackie pretends to be Jackson's friend. Chan's deception is successful, and he eventually meets Uncle 7, the Tsuis' father and the local Triad boss. Uncle 7 is seriously ill and will be getting surgery soon. Jackie reveals the true nature of his visit to both Uncle 7 and Annie and informs them of Jackson's criminal activities. Unknown to Jackie, Jackson is hiding at the hospital and has given a nuclear warhead (disguised as a small oxygen tank) to Annie, who hides it at the aquarium.

While following Annie, Jackie gets held up by Jackson, who claims to have a deal with Gregor. He also reveals that Gregor has secretly put audio bugs in objects the FSB gave Jackie. After realizing he has been used by Gregor, Jackie decides to return home and write a full report to both of their superiors. Two men are sent to kill him, and he is framed for the murder of Uncle 7. He attempts to clear his name by going to see Annie at the memorial hall, but he is unwelcome, having to fight Allen and the family's bodyguards until Jackson arrives to clear Jackie's name. Jackson explains that Gregor caught him on a CIA assignment three years before, and forced him to turn into a triple agent: a CIA agent ostensibly turned by the FSB, but in reality serving Gregor's private criminal schemes.

Gregor uses the nuclear warheads to secure stakes in oil franchises in the Middle East. Jackson was trying to get money from Gregor for the warhead. However, after overhearing the conversation, Annie believes Jackie was right and blames Jackson for his wrongdoing behind her back. Annie, Jackie, and Jackson decide to work together to find Gregor and bring him in. Uncle 7's elaborate Chinatown funeral becomes the scene for a shootout between the various parties, injuring Jackson in the process. Annie and Jackie attempt to retrieve the stolen warhead from the shark pool (so that they can return it to the police), but Gregor and his men follow them, leading to a confrontation underwater. During it, Gregor shoots the aquarium tank and shatters the glass, which releases a great white shark into the restaurant area.

During the confusion, Gregor escapes with the warhead and kidnaps Annie to a getaway boat. Jackie saves the tourists from the shark and then pursues Gregor. While Gregor escapes in the getaway boat, Jackie finds and drives a display car (Note: More specifically, a Mitsubishi FTO.) onto the boat. The car pins Gregor, allowing Jackie to retrieve the warhead and save Annie as armed police close in. The Australian police apprehend Gregor and Jackson and turn them over to Russian authorities. Jackie is thanked for his work by the FSB and returns to his work in Hong Kong.

== Cast ==
- Jackie Chan as "Kevin" Chan Ka-kui or himself
- Jackson Lou as Jackson Tsui
- Annie Wu as Annie Tsui
- Bill Tung as "Uncle" Bill Wong
- Yuriy Petrov as Col. Gregor Yegorov
- Nonna Grishayeva as Natasha Rekshynskaya
- John Eaves as CIA Lieutenant Mark
- Terry Woo as Uncle Seven
- Allen Sit as Allen
- Jean Gilpin as Australian Group Lady
- Rocky Lai as Golden Dragon Club Member 1
- Chan Wai-to as Golden Dragon Club Member 2
- Chan Man-ching as Golden Dragon Club Member 3
- Tang Chiu-yau as Golden Dragon Club Member 4
- Alex Yip as Golden Dragon Club Member 5
- Brett Arthur as Russian Hit Man 1
- Mark French as Russian Hit Man 2
- Damien Gates as Russian Hit Man 3
- Mark Gilks as Russian Hit Man 4
- Nathan Jones as Russian Hit Man 5 (the tall hitman who beats up and chases Jackie in his hotel room)
- Matthew Walker Kininmonth as Russian Hit Man 6
- John Langmead as Russian Hit Man 7
- Steve Livingstone as Russian Hit Man 8
- Steve Morris as Russian Hit Man 9

== Distribution ==
New Line Cinema re-edited the film, making the following changes: new opening credits sequence with Hong Kong scenery, removal of over 20 minutes of footage, new music composed by J. Peter Robinson and almost all the multi-lingual dialogue (English, Cantonese, Mandarin, Russian and Ukrainian) dubbed into English.

All Mei Ah Entertainment releases, the Japanese Warner Home Video DVD and the Towa laserdisc were the only versions that contain the film uncut and without the language dubbing. The Mei Ah releases feature English subtitles.

A remastered German-exclusive Blu-ray was released by Plaion Pictures on 24 October 2024, featuring both the uncut and US edit versions with English and German subtitles, along with German and Mandarin dubbed audio tracks.

On 27 March 2026, Arrow Video announced that they would release both the international cut of the film as well as the Hong Kong theatrical cut on Blu-ray, as part of the "Jackie Chan's Breakout Hits" box set.

== Commercial reception ==
=== Box office ===
Box office performance
Market	Year	Gross revenue (est.)		Ticket sales (est.)	Ref
Market	Year	Local currency	US dollars	Ticket sales (est.)	Ref
Hong Kong	1996	HK$57,518,795	$7,436,890	1,200,000	
China	1996	CN¥112,000,000	$14,640,000	15,000,000	
Taiwan	1996	NT$47,284,460	$1,732,032	234,956	
Japan	1996	¥545,000,000	$5,010,000	440,000	
South Korea	1996	Unknown	$4,220,000	739,845	
North America	1997	US$15,318,863	$15,318,863	3,337,400	
United Kingdom	1997	£224,000	$457,000	55,070	
Germany	1997	€1,860,000	$2,109,000	357,639	
Spain	1997	€246,000	$279,000	72,272	
Netherlands	1997	€34,000	$39,000	6,110	
France	1997	€603,000	$684,000	113,746	
France	1998	€765,000	$858,000	144,431	
Hungary	1997	€145,000	$164,000	103,235	
Hungary	1999	€153,000	$163,000	84,943	
Romania	1998	€49,000	$55,000	53,947	
Romania	1999	€2,619	$2,791	3,742	
Total		US$53,168,576		21,947,336	
Inflation adjusted (2021)		US$98,816,196			

First Strike was an enormous box office success in Hong Kong, grossing HK$57,518,795 during its theatrical run. It remains Jackie Chan's highest-grossing film in Hong Kong and the third highest-grossing domestic film in Hong Kong film history.

In China, it grossed CN¥112 million at the box office. In Taiwan, it grossed NT$47,284,460. In Japan, it earned ¥545 million at the box office. In South Korea, it grossed US$4.22 million. In Europe, the film sold 72,272 tickets in Spain and 922,863 in other EU countries.

The film was released on 10 January 1997 in 1,344 North American theatres, grossing US$5,778,933 ($4,299 per screen) in its opening weekend. Its total North American box office gross was $15,318,863. Adjusted for inflation in 2021, the film grossed the equivalent of US$32,401,297 in North America and US$98,816,196 worldwide.

=== Home media ===
In the United States, the home video release grossed US$13,830,000 (equivalent to $28,000,000 in 2025) in video rental revenue during 1997. It was the seventh highest-grossing New Line rental video that year. This adds up to US$60,548,863 (equivalent to US$126,553,603 adjusted for inflation in 2021) in combined revenue from the box office and US video rentals by 1997.

In the United Kingdom, the film was watched by 2.2 million viewers on television in 2004, making it the year's second most-watched foreign-language film on television (below Crouching Tiger, Hidden Dragon). The original Police Story drew 1.2 million UK viewers the same year, adding up to a combined 3.4 million UK viewership for both Police Story films in 2004.

== Critical reception ==
The version of the film released in North American cinemas by New Line was met with an overall positive critical response. Mike LaSalle of the San Francisco Chronicle gave the film an enthusiastic review:

One of the pleasures of being alive at this period of history is Jackie Chan. There are other pleasures, of course, and other movie pleasures, too. But few things in film today are as reliable as a Jackie Chan movie. Even if the picture is weak, Chan is never disappointing. Watching him in Jackie Chan's First Strike, a brand-new effort opening today, there's no doubt that this is a lovable original and a great popular artist. So this time Chan swims with sharks. He climbs from balcony to balcony on the top floor of a tall hotel building. He even -- get this -- drops 100 feet from a helicopter into a frozen lake, just as the helicopter explodes.

Roger Ebert reviewed the film in January 1997 and rated it three out of four stars. He noted that "Chan is said to be the world's top action star" outside of the United States, and that what "makes him popular is not just his stunts (he is famous for doing them all himself) but his attitude" and reactions to them. He said "Jackie Chan is an acquired taste" and the film lacks "the polish of big-budget Hollywood extravaganzas" while the dubbed dialogue "sounds like cartoon captions," but that "Chan himself is a graceful and skilled physical actor, immensely likable, and there's a kind of Boy Scout innocence in the action that's refreshing after all the doom-mongering, blood-soaked Hollywood action movies."

Arlington Heights Daily Herald newspaper rated it two-and-a-half out of four stars, calling it a "homage to James Bond, spiced up with elaborate fight pieces choreographed to show off Chan's incredible comic battle style."

It currently has a 52% approval rating on Rotten Tomatoes, with a 6.2/10 average rating from 23 reviewers.

== Awards and nominations ==
- 1997 Hong Kong Film Awards
  - Won: Best Action Choreography (Stanley Tong)
  - Nominated: Best Picture
  - Nominated: Best Actor (Jackie Chan)
  - Nominated: Best New Performer (Annie Wu)
  - Nominated: Best Film Editing (Peter Cheung, Yau Chi-wai)
- 1996 Golden Horse Film Festival
  - Won: Best Action Direction (Stanley Tong)
- 1997 MTV Movie Awards
  - Nominated: Best Fight
