= Police Story 2 =

1988 Hong Kong film by Jackie Chan

- Hong Kong film poster

Chinese name
- Traditional Chinese: 警察故事續集
- Simplified Chinese: 警察故事续集
Transcriptions
Standard Mandarin
- Hanyu Pinyin: Jǐngchá Gùshì Xùjí
Yue: Cantonese
- Jyutping: Ging2 Chaat3 Gu3 Si6 Zuk6 Zaap6
- Directed by: Jackie Chan
- Written by: Jackie Chan; Edward Tang; Masahiro Kakefuda
- Produced by: Leonard Ho
- Starring: Jackie Chan; Maggie Cheung; Charlie Cho
- Cinematography: Cheung Yiu Cho; Danny Lee Yau Tong
- Edited by: Peter Cheung
- Music by: Michael Lai; Tang Siu Lam
- Production company: Golden Way Films Ltd.
- Distributed by: Golden Harvest; Media Asia Fortune Star Media Ltd.
- Release date: 20 August 1988
- Running time: 105 minutes
- Country: Hong Kong
- Languages: Cantonese; English
- Box office: US$11.5 million (est.)

Police Story 2 (Chinese: 警察故事續集; Jyutping: Ging2 caat3 gu3 si6 zuk6 zaap6 lit. 'Police Story Sequel'), also known as Police Story Part 2, is a 1988 Hong Kong action comedy film starring and directed by Jackie Chan, who also wrote the screenplay with Edward Tang. It is a sequel to the hit 1985 film Police Story, continuing the storyline of Chan's character "Kevin" Chan Ka-kui, and is the second installment of Police Story series. It also marks the last appearance in the series for Lam Kwok-Hung as Chief Inspector Raymond Li, Chor Yuen as Chu Tao, and Charlie Cho as John Ko.

== Plot ==
After the events of the first film, Sergeant Chan Ka-kui has been demoted to constable of highway patrol as the result of his handling of his previous case, which involved the violent arrest of crime lord Chu Tao and heavy property damage. The new duty pleases his girlfriend, May, who is glad that her boyfriend is no longer taking difficult cases and has more time to see her.

However, the happy mood changes when Ka-Kui is greeted by Chu Tao and his bespectacled right-hand man John Ko. It seems Chu Tao is terminally ill with only three months left to live, so he has been released from prison, and while he is still alive he vows to make life difficult for Ka-Kui.

John Ko and some henchmen show up at Ka-Kui's apartment and intimidate him, baiting the policeman to attack. Later, May and her aunt are beaten by John Ko and his men. Ka-Kui can no longer hold back, and he lashes out against John Ko and his men at a restaurant.

Ashamed of his behavior, Ka-Kui resigns from the Royal Hong Kong Police Force. He plans to take a trip to Bali with May, but while he is at a travel agency in a shopping mall, some police officers see him and report that the mall is under a bomb threat.

Unable to resist the urge to get involved in police work, Ka-Kui tells the officers to sound the fire alarm and have the mall cleared, and agrees to take responsibility for the decision. A bomb does indeed explode, and the entire mall is leveled by the blast.

Ka-Kui is praised for his efforts, and he is reinstated and assigned to solve the case of the bombing. Ka-Kui plants a covert listening device in the mall property company's office to try to learn more about the bombers. This leads to a suspect who is a deaf-mute and is a fierce martial artist and explosives expert.

The bombing gang (four men consisting of the leader Tall Pau Hung aka The Polar Bear, Ken, and the two bomb experts, one of them being deaf-mute), also aware that the police are on to them, plan a simultaneous bombing of the property company and the police headquarters. They double their ransom demand to $20 million and kidnap May, luring Ka-Kui into a trap in which he is strapped with an explosive vest and forced to pick up the extortion money from the property company.

After picking up the money, Ka-Kui tells the gang that they are being followed and split up. Ka-kui, still holding the ransom, is able to drive his car into a tunnel so that the bomb he is wearing cannot be activated and he strips it off. He then goes to rescue May, who is being held tied up and gagged in a warehouse full of fireworks.

After defeating other gang members, Ka-Kui again faces the deaf-mute man, who throws large bang snaps at him. Ka-Kui is unable to beat him hand-to-hand, but then gains the upper hand by using his own bang snaps against him, and throwing him off a third story catwalk onto a pile of plastic drums below. Ka-Kui then rescues May and departs the warehouse, just as it explodes in a huge ball of fire.

== Cast ==
- Jackie Chan as Sergeant "Kevin" Chan Ka-kui a.k.a. Jackie Chan (New Line Cinema & Fortune Star Media dubs)
- Maggie Cheung as May
- Bill Tung as "Uncle" Bill Wong / Inspector Chou
- Lisa Chiao Chiao as Aunt
- Kenny Ho as Cops
- Lam Kwok-Hung as Chief Inspector Raymond Li
- Chor Yuen as Chu Tu a.k.a. Tom Koo (New Line Cinema English dub)
- Charlie Cho as John Ko a.k.a. John Chow (New Line Cinema English dub)
- Benny Lai as Dummy / Deaf Criminal / Gabby (New Line Cinema dub)
- Mars as Inspector Kim
- Johnny Cheung as Cheung
- Ben Lam as Tall Pau Hung / The Polar Bear
- Chi Fai Chan as Ngor
- Shan Kwan as President Fung
- Isabella Wong as Miss Wong, Secretary of President Fung
- Ann Mui as Karen

== Release ==
=== Box office ===
Police Story 2 was released in Hong Kong on 20 August 1988, grossing HK$34,151,609 (US$4,375,046) at the Hong Kong box office. In Taiwan, it grossed NT$16,688,260 (US$593,255). In Japan, it earned ¥700 million (US$5.46 million) at the box office. In South Korea, the film sold 191,739 tickets in the capital city of Seoul, equivalent to an estimated ₩766,956,000 (US$1,049,000). This adds up to a combined US$11,477,301 (equivalent to $31,000,000 in 2025) grossed in East Asia.

The film was released in Malaysia by Golden Communications and became the country's highest-grossing film of 1988.

4K restorations of Police Story 2 and its predecessor received a limited North American theatrical release from Janus Films beginning on 1 February 2019.

=== Home media ===
The Hong Kong version is 105 minutes long, while the Japanese release is 122 minutes long. Golden Harvest's export version of the film, released in the UK and European territories, runs 95 minutes. The IVL Police Story Trilogy DVD boxed set version is the Japanese cut with Hong Kong blooper footage. Hong Kong-based company Kam & Ronson Enterprise released the first three Police Story films on Blu-ray Disc in June 2009.

New Line Cinema acquired the rights to distribute the export version of Police Story 2 on VHS & Laserdisc on 15 June 1999, with a recycled soundtrack score from J. Peter Robinson. In 2007, Dragon Dynasty released the Japanese cut on DVD. Shout! Factory released Police Story and Police Story 2 as a double feature on DVD and Blu-ray Disc on 16 April 2013.

The Criterion Collection released both Police Story and its sequel on Blu-ray on 30 April 2019. Unlike Shout! Factory's Blu-ray release, Criterion's release used 4K restorations of both of the films, as well as the Hong Kong-release version of Police Story 2. It also includes bonus features on Jackie Chan himself, such as new programs on his screen persona and action-filmmaking techniques, a stunt reel, and archival interviews with him and stuntman Benny Lai, as well as a 1964 TV program about Peking-opera training that was akin to the education Chan received as a child.

=== Television ===
In the United Kingdom, the film (released as Jackie Chan's Police Story 2) was watched by 700,000 viewers on Channel 5 in 2007, making it the year's most-watched foreign-language film on Channel 5.

== Reception ==
The film received a rating of 84% on review aggregator Rotten Tomatoes. Marc Savlov of The Austin Chronicle rated it 3/5 stars and called it "a fine introduction to the Jackie Chan phenomenon" that is less emotionally charged than the first film and less outlandish than its sequel, Supercop. The film holds a score of 68 out of 100 on Metacritic based on 7 critic reviews, indicating "generally favorable reviews". TV Guide rated it 4/5 stars and wrote that the film makes up for its lack of story and eye-opening stunts with better pacing and more action. They concluded that this film "remains among Chan's best". In a review of the Shout! Factory double-bill, Calum Marsh of Slant Magazine rated it 3.5/5 stars and wrote: "This isn't so much exemplary filmmaking as it is bravura stunt work, but Police Story is a veritable case study in the value of the latter". On reviewing the Police Story series, Kim Newman wrote in Sight & Sound that "a rare instance of a sequel that takes criticism of the original into account, but not to the benefit of the series" as Chan "actually does tone down the destruction, making for an oddly action-light action movie with the amiable Chan out of his depth as the story tries to turn serious".

In 2014, Time Out polled several film critics, directors, actors and stunt actors to list their top action films. Police Story 2 was listed at 61st place on this list.

== Awards and nominations ==
- 1989 Hong Kong Film Awards
  - Won: Best Action Choreography

== See also ==
- The Protector
- Crime Story
- Police Story 3: Supercop
- List of Hong Kong films
