= The Extreme Fox =

2014 Chinese-Hong Kong film by Wellson Chin

- Poster
- 非狐外传
- Directed by: Wellson Chin
- Written by: Sap Sam Chan; Stanley Tong
- Cinematography: Yip Wai-Ying
- Production companies: Pearl River Film Group; Pro-east Entertainment Limited; Guangzhou Futang Investment; Pearl River Film Digital Media; Great Cinema Enterprise (Beijing); Guangdong Zhuying Film Production
- Distributed by: Pearl River Pictures; Guangdong Dadi Theatre Circuit
- Release date: 14 March 2014
- Running time: 90 minutes
- Countries: China; Hong Kong
- Languages: Mandarin; Cantonese
- Box office: CN¥6.1 million

The Extreme Fox (Chinese: 非狐外传) is a 2014 period fantasy romance film directed by Wellson Chin. A China-Hong Kong co-production, the film was released on 14 March 2014.

== Cast ==
- Chrissie Chau
- Alex Fong
- Lam Suet
- Renata Tan
- A-Wei
- Jun-qi Huang
- Jianbo Zhang
- Zifen Tsai
- Zehu Yang
- Weiming Meng
- Zaidong Hao
- He Meitian
- Kangxi Jia
- Hailong Yin
- Fulin Fan

== Reception ==
The film earned CN¥6.093 million at the Chinese box office.
