= Police Story (1985 film) =

1985 Hong Kong film by Jackie Chan

- Hong Kong theatrical poster

Chinese name
- Traditional Chinese: 警察故事
- Simplified Chinese: 警察故事
Transcriptions
Standard Mandarin
- Hanyu Pinyin: Jǐngchá Gùshì
Yue: Cantonese
- Jyutping: Ging2 Caat3 Gu3 Si6
- Directed by: Jackie Chan
- Written by: Jackie Chan; Edward Tang
- Produced by: Leonard Ho
- Starring: Jackie Chan; Brigitte Lin; Maggie Cheung
- Cinematography: Cheung Yiu Cho
- Edited by: Peter Cheung
- Music by: Michael Lai; Tang Siu Lam; Kevin Bassinson
- Production company: Golden Way Films Ltd.
- Distributed by: Golden Harvest
- Release date: 14 December 1985
- Running time: 100 minutes
- Country: Hong Kong
- Language: Cantonese
- Box office: US$18.7 million (est.)

Police Story (Chinese: 警察故事; pinyin: Jǐngchá Gùshì; Jyutping: Ging2 caat3 gu3 si6) is a 1985 Hong Kong action comedy film directed by and starring Jackie Chan, who co-wrote the screenplay with Edward Tang. It is the first film in the Police Story franchise. It features Chan as Hong Kong police detective "Kevin" Chan Ka-Kui, alongside Brigitte Lin and Maggie Cheung. In the film, Ka-Kui helps arrest a drug lord, but must clear his own name after being accused of murder.

Chan began work on the film after a disappointing experience working with James Glickenhaus on The Protector (1985), which was intended to be his entry into the American film market. Police Story contains many large-scale action sequences with elaborate, dangerous stunts performed by Chan and his stunt team, including car chases, Chan hanging off a speeding bus, parkour-like acrobatics, and a shopping mall fight with shattering glass panes, leading up to Chan sliding down a pole with exploding electric lights as he falls to the ground. Much of the film was created surrounding the action sequences, which Chan and the filmmakers developed via linear progression.

Police Story was a box-office success in Asia and Europe, grossing an estimated US$18,724,000 (equivalent to $56,100,000 in 2025). It won the Best Film award at the 1986 Hong Kong Film Awards. According to Chan's autobiography, he considers Police Story his best action film. Since its release, Police Story has been frequently listed as one of the greatest action films of all time. It is also considered one of the best martial arts movies of all time. In 2016, Police Story was voted the fifth best action movie of all time in Time Out's poll of film critics, directors, actors and stunt performers. Chan's final action sequence in the mall is considered one of the greatest stunts in the history of action cinema. A 4K restoration of the film had a limited theatrical release in North America on 1 February 2019. A sequel, Police Story 2, was released in 1988.

== Plot ==
The Royal Hong Kong Police Force plans Operation Boar Hunt, an undercover sting to arrest crime lord Chu Tao. It involves undercover officers stationed in a shantytown. However, the criminals spot them, and a shootout ensues between the two groups. Civilians either flee the town or are caught in the crossfire. Chu Tao and his men flee in their car by driving through the town. However, they crash the car immediately after going downhill and escape on foot. Undercover officer Sergeant Chan Ka-Kui (Note: Known as Kevin Chan in some versions.) persists in his chase on foot as Chu Tao and his men attempt to escape in a double-decker bus. Ka-Kui gets in front of the bus and brings it to a halt by threatening to shoot the driver with his service revolver.

Later, Ka-Kui is reprimanded by Chief Inspector Raymond Li for letting the operation get out of hand, but is subsequently presented to the media as a model police officer to please the police brass. His next assignment is to protect Chu Tao's secretary, Salina Fong, who is pressured to testify in court about Chu Tao's illegal activities. At first, Salina insists that she does not require protection, but Ka-Kui has a fellow policeman break into her apartment and pose as a knife-wielding assassin. After Ka-Kui and Salina fight him off, she agrees to be more cooperative. The two drive away in her car, but are ambushed by Chu Tao's actual hitmen, who are scared away when Salina threatens them with Ka-Kui's revolver.

When Ka-Kui arrives at his apartment with Salina, he is surprised to find his girlfriend May and her friends throwing a birthday party for him. May becomes angry with Ka-Kui after seeing Salina only wearing lingerie and Ka-Kui's jacket. Ka-Kui eventually explains to May that Salina is a witness. While he tries to apologize to May, Salina discovers that the attack at her apartment was a sham, and decides to record over her taped confession about working for Chu Tao. She sneaks away while Ka-Kui sleeps. She is subsequently not present at the trial the next day, which ends with failure for the prosecution because of Salina's absence and tampering with the recording.

Though Chu Tao is released on bail, he wants revenge against Ka-Kui. He captures Salina and threatens to kill her to ensure her silence. Ka-Kui finds and frees her, but is attacked by Chu Tao's men. Fellow Police Inspector Man eventually arrives and reveals that he had been working with Chu Tao; Salina's capture was merely a ruse to trap Ka-Kui. To Man's surprise, the plan is also to include Tao's men killing him with Ka-Kui's gun to frame him for murder. Now a fugitive cop killer, Ka-Kui wants to catch Chu Tao and clear his name. He returns to the police station to plead his case, but the Chief Inspector orders him to be arrested. Ka-Kui takes the Chief Inspector as a hostage to escape custody, but soon lets his co-operative superior go free to continue his investigation.

Salina goes to Chu Tao's office at a shopping mall to download incriminating data from Chu Tao's computer system. Chu Tao notices this and rushes to the mall with his men to intervene. Ka-Kui and May, who are monitoring Chu Tao's activities, follow. In the ensuing carnage, Ka-Kui defeats all of Chu Tao's henchmen, destroying a good portion of the mall in the process. The briefcase containing the computer data falls to the bottom floor of the mall, but Chu Tao and his men retrieve it after attacking May. Ka-Kui, at the top floor, slides down a pole wrapped in light bulbs to the bottom floor and catches Chu. The rest of the police force then arrive and prevent him from further taking matters into his own hands. Salina attests to them that Chu had Sergeant Man killed and that evidence of his crimes is in the briefcase. Chu's defense attorney shows up and accuses the police of misconduct, prompting a beating from an at-wit's-end Ka-Kui, who goes on to extend the beating to Chu Tao before being stopped by his friends.

== Cast ==
- Jackie Chan as Sergeant "Kevin" Chan Ka-Kui (or himself in new second, new third, and fourth English dubs), but in old English dubs of second and third movies, the Kevin name was used.
- Brigitte Lin as Salina Fong, Chu Tao's secretary aka Selina Fong (all English dubs) (as Brigette Lin)
- Maggie Cheung as May, Ka-Kui's Girlfriend
- Chor Yuen as Chu Tao, Crime Lord aka Tom Koo (first and second English dubs) / Joe Chu (third and fourth English dubs)
- Charlie Cho as John Ko, gangster aka John Chow (second English dub)
- Fung Hark-On as Danny Chu Ko / Danny Koo (first and second English dubs)
- Lam Kwok-Hung as Chief Inspector Raymond Li
- Bill Tung as Inspector "Uncle" Bill Chou / Inspector Wong (first and second English dubs) / Inspector George (third and fourth English dubs)
- Kam Hing Yin as Inspector Man / Sergeant Mao (first and second English dubs) / Sergeant Ming (third and fourth English dubs)
- Mars as Kim
- Lau Chi-wing as Lawyer Cheung
- Tai Po as Lee / Snake Eyes (first and second English dubs) / Sharkey (third and fourth English dubs)
- Kent Tong as Tak / Tom / Francis Tong (Japanese release version)
- Wan Fat as Mad Wing / Jacknife (1st and 2nd English dubs) / Crazy Wing (third English dub) / Psycho Wing (fourth English dub)
- Bowie Wu as Sha Tau Kok police officer
- Clarence Fok as Photographer
- Money Lo as TV reporter

=== Jackie Chan stunt team ===
- Chan Tat-kwong
- Johnny Cheung
- Danny Chow
- Fung Hak-on
- Benny Lai
- Rocky Lai
- Sam Wong
- Ben Lam
- Chris Li
- Mars
- Pang Hiu-sang
- Paul Wong

== Production ==
The film contained many large-scale action scenes, including an opening sequence featuring a car chase through a shanty town, Chan dangling from a speeding double-decker bus before stopping it with his service revolver, and a climactic fight scene in a shopping mall. This final scene earned the film the nickname "Glass Story" by the crew, due to the huge number of panes of sugar glass that were broken. During a stunt in this last scene in which Chan slides down a pole from several stories up, the lights covering the pole had heated it considerably and resulted in Chan suffering second-degree burns, particularly to his hands. Chan also suffered a back injury and dislocation of his pelvis upon landing.

Screenwriter Edward Tang said that he did not write this film the way normal Hollywood screenwriters work. Chan instructed Tang to structure the film around a list of props and locations, e.g. a shopping mall, a village, a bus, etc.

In an interview with Chan, he discusses the stunt of sliding down the pole covered with lights. As with the clock tower stunt from Project A (1983), Chan described his fear at the thought of performing the stunt. During the filming of Police Story, there was the added pressure of strict time constraints, as the shopping mall had to be cleaned up and ready for business the following morning. One of Chan's stuntmen gave him a hug and a Buddhist prayer paper, which he put in his trousers before finally performing the stunt.

Stuntman Blackie Ko doubled for Chan during a motorcycle stunt in which his character drives through glass towards a hitman. In the double decker bus scene, Jackie used a metal umbrella because a wooden one kept slipping when he tried to hang onto the bus.

== Box office ==
The film grossed HK$26,626,760 at the Hong Kong box office, becoming the third highest-grossing film of the year. In Taiwan, it grossed NT$20,549,670 between 1985 and 1986, becoming one of the top ten highest-grossing films of 1986. In Japan, it was the eighth highest-grossing foreign film of 1986, grossing ¥1.9 billion at the Japanese box office. In South Korea, it was the third highest-grossing film of 1988, with 192,327 ticket sales in Seoul City.

In Europe, the film sold 245,452 tickets in France (released 1987), 846,700 tickets in Hungary (released 1988) and 65,700 tickets in Romania. In the United States, the film was screened in 1993 at the Hogg Memorial Auditorium in Austin, Texas, along with Police Story 3: Supercop, with both films well-received among Austin audiences at the time. The film later had a limited US release in 2019, grossing US$113,164.

Market	Year	Box office gross revenue		Ticket sales	Ref
Market	Year	Local currency	US dollars	Ticket sales	Ref
Hong Kong	1985	HK$26,626,760	$3,418,069	1,800,000 (est.)	
Taiwan	1985	NT$20,549,670	$578,048	312,245	
Japan	1985	¥1,900,000,000	$11,300,000	1,700,000 (est.)	
France	1987	€908,200 (est.)	$1,048,426 (est.)	245,452	
South Korea (Seoul City)	1988	₩769,308,000 (est.)	$1,051,732 (est.)	192,327	
Hungary	1988	€931,400 (est.)	$1,101,381 (est.)	846,700	
Romania	1996	€26,300 (est.)	$33,393 (est.)	65,700	
United States (limited release)	2019	US$113,164	$113,164	12,560 (est.)	
Worldwide		est. US$18,724,000 (equivalent to $56,100,000 in 2025)		5,174,984 (est.)	

== Critical reception ==
Upon release, the film received critical acclaim in Hong Kong. At the 5th Hong Kong Film Awards in 1986, it won Best Picture and Best Action Choreography, out of six nominations.

Overseas, the film initially received a mixed reaction in contemporary English-language reviews. Kim Newman wrote, in the Monthly Film Bulletin, that Police Story starts well with its car chase described as an "astonishing set-piece", but that "once the mix of realistic settings and fantasy action seems to have been established, the film falls back on Chan's clowning and turns into a slapstick comedy heavily dependent on cake-in-the-face jokes". The review concluded that the film "still lacks much of the aesthetic appeal and occasional comic grace of the more traditional period kung fu films such as Project A, Drunken Master, Snake in the Eagle's Shadow and Dragon Lord". Vincent Canby wrote in The New York Times that at a screening of the film at the New York Film Festival Chan was promoted as a hybrid of Buster Keaton and Clint Eastwood, with Canby noting that Chan was "more like a scaled-down, oriental Sylvester Stallone, with energy and a willingness to smile fondly at himself". Canby also noted the excessive pie-in-the-face gags, and that Chan "participates in several elaborately staged gun fights and car chases" which were "mildly amusing" but not as amusing as the dubbed dialogue. Canby concluded that the film "is of principal interest as a souvenir of another culture".

The film went on to receive wide acclaim in later reviews. Michael Zey reviewed the film in The Daily Texan and rated it three-and-a-half stars in 1993, calling it a "great action thriller" that leaves "most American action films in the dust." He praised the "absolutely stunning" action scenes, saying the "film must have set a new record for the number of people thrown through windows in a single action film" as Chan eventually "perfects another action scene" with his final stunt. He also praised Chan's unique humor with the "long complicated scenes of physical comedy" rather than the usual "awful one-liner your average hero spouts after wasting a bad guy." He called it "great action entertainment" but noted "many people" would "snub it because they'll have to read subtitles." He concluded that "Jackie Chan is the true last action hero."

On review aggregator website Rotten Tomatoes, the film holds an approval rating of 90% based on 31 reviews. The site's consensus reads: "Blending brilliant physical comedy with thrillingly choreographed set pieces, Police Story makes a persuasive case for Jackie Chan as one of the all-time genre greats." On Metacritic, which uses a weighted average, the film received a score of 78 out of 100 based on 9 critics, indicating "generally favorable reviews".

A review from the Time Out Film Guide stated: "In Jackie Chan-land vehicles are for trashing small buildings, while big buildings are for falling off or sliding down... The likeable and graceful Chan directs, sings and performs jaw-dropping stunts". In advance of the film's 4K restoration release in 2018, Matt Zoller Seitz of RogerEbert.com gave the film four out of four stars, saying that Police Story "is one of the great 1980s action films. It is also one of the most 1980s action films", commenting its "cop-on-the-edge clichés" and synthesizer music. Seitz further wrote that "The entire film has the mentality of a master showman who wants to dazzle in every moment, big or small.... A stunt near the end gets repeated at full length three times, from three different angles; this would seem like a display of narcissism if it weren’t one of the greatest stunts in the history of movies, right up there with the collapsing house in Steamboat Bill, Jr. and the final fall in Sharky’s Machine".

In 2016, when Time Out polled 50 film critics, directors, actors and stunt actors to list their top action films of all time, Police Story was voted the fourth best action film of all time. Film critic Trevor Johnston wrote that "you have to go back to the silent-comedy era of Harold Lloyd and Buster Keaton to find the equivalent of Jackie Chan in his Hong Kong prime—a star who’d put life and limb at risk to get the shot he wanted"—and that "Chan’s ’80s peak delivers a whole other level of insanity." He praised "the exuberant blend of comic knockabout thrills and heart-stopping spills from this landmark cop flick," especially his "batshit crazy" final stunt which "has since become celluloid legend."

== Accolades ==
- 1986 Hong Kong Film Awards
  - Won: Best Picture
  - Won: Best Action Choreography (Jackie Chan Stunt Team)
  - Nominated: Best Director (Jackie Chan)
  - Nominated: Best Actor (Jackie Chan)
  - Nominated: Best Actress (Brigitte Lin)
  - Nominated: Best Cinematography (Cheung Yiu Cho)
  - Nominated: Best Film Editing (Peter Cheung)

== Home media ==
=== Home video ===
The film was released on VHS in the United States by the distributor Cinema Group under the title Jackie Chan's Police Force, using Golden Harvest's export version created for international distribution, and featuring a new music score by composer Kevin Bassinson. The export cut is shorter than the original cut by 13 minutes.

New Line Cinema acquired the rights to the export version of the film, distributing it on VHS and Laserdisc on 4 August 1998, with a recycled soundtrack score from J. Peter Robinson replacing Bassinson's music. On 19 December 2006, The Weinstein Company released the film on Region 1 NTSC DVD (under their Dragon Dynasty label) with special features and deleted scenes; it was also released in Canada on 23 January 2007.

In late 2004, Hong Kong's Intercontinental Video Limited released a remastered anamorphic widescreen Police Story Trilogy boxed set in Region 0 NTSC format, featuring optional English subtitles and a choice of Chinese-language soundtracks. Hong Kong-based company Kam & Ronsom Enterprise released the first three Police Story films on Blu-ray Disc in June 2009. The first film was released on Blu-ray on 14 September 2009.

Shout! Factory released Police Story and Police Story 2 as a double feature on DVD and Blu-ray Disc on 16 April 2013.

The Criterion Collection released both Police Story and Police Story 2 on Blu-ray on 30 April 2019 with 4K restoration on both of the films, as well as including the Hong Kong-release version of Police Story 2. The release also includes bonus features on Jackie Chan himself; new programs on his screen persona and action-filmmaking techniques, a stunt reel, and archival interviews with Chan and stuntman Benny Lai, as well as a 1964 TV program about Peking opera training that was akin to the education Chan received as a child.

=== Television ===
In the United Kingdom, the film (released as Jackie Chan's Police Story) was watched by 1.2 million viewers on television in 2004, making it the year's fifth most-watched foreign-language film on television (below four other Hong Kong action films). It was later watched by 800,000 UK viewers in 2006, making it the year's most-watched foreign-language film on Channel 5. Combined, the film drew a 2 million UK viewership in 2004 and 2006.

== Sequels ==
=== Police Story 2 ===
Police Story 2 (Chinese: 警察故事２), made in 1988, features many of the same actors reprising their roles from the original. The story picks up with Chan Ka-Kui demoted to traffic cop for causing so much damage in his apprehension of Chu. Chu has been released from prison on the pretense that he is terminally ill, and Chu and his clan continue to harass Chan and his girlfriend May as Chan gets reinstated to the detective unit when criminal bombers begin extorting money from businessmen.

=== Police Story 3: Super Cop ===
Police Story 3 (Chinese: 警察故事３超級警察, or Supercop) was made in 1992. Michelle Yeoh joins the cast, portraying a police officer from Mainland China. The story involves Chan and Yeoh's characters going undercover to break up a drug smuggling ring in Malaysia. The action moves from China to Kuala Lumpur, where Chan's girlfriend May is kidnapped. The film marks the last appearance of Maggie Cheung as May. Michelle Yeoh reprises her role in the spin-off, Project S (1993). Dimension Films released Police Story 3 in the US in 1996 under the name of Supercop with some edits to the film, the complete replacement of all music and sound effects, and English dubbing.

=== Police Story 4: First Strike ===
Police Story 4 (Chinese: 簡單任務 or Jackie Chan's First Strike), made in 1996, is the only film in the Police Story series made partially in English. The action shifts away from Hong Kong and East Asia, with a globe trekking espionage plot, lending the film the air of a James Bond adventure. New Line Cinema's US release contained several alterations. Filmed on location in Ukraine and Australia, the film also marks the last appearance of Bill Tung, who plays Chan's superior in the series.

=== New Police Story ===
New Police Story (Chinese: 新警察故事), made in 2004, is a reboot of the Police Story series. Chan portrays a disgraced detective named Wing, and acts alongside younger Hong Kong actors including Nicholas Tse, Charlene Choi and Daniel Wu. The story features a more dramatic focus, taking a darker and more serious tone.

=== Police Story 2013 ===
Police Story 2013 (Police Story: Lockdown in North America) is a 2013 Chinese-Hong Kong action crime film starring Jackie Chan in another reboot of the Police Story film series. The film is directed by Ding Sheng, who previously helmed Chan's Little Big Soldier. According to Chan, unlike the previous Police Story films where he portrayed a Hong Kong cop, in the new film he portrays a mainland Chinese officer. Like New Police Story, 2013 is a stand-alone installment with a darker tone than the previous installments, which were comedies.

== Popular culture ==
- The shanty town chase inspired a similar sequence in Bad Boys II. A similar scene also appeared in the 2004 Thai film Born to Fight.
- Jackie Chan fan Brandon Lee paid homage in his film Rapid Fire by filming a similar sequence from the mall fight scene, in which Jackie's character rams a villain with a motorcycle, through multiple layers of glass.
- The scene where Chan stops a bus inspired a similar scene in the Sylvester Stallone and Kurt Russell film Tango & Cash.
- Between 1994 and 2004, the Hong Kong TV series Police Report adopted the Police Story theme song sung by Jackie Chan, as its own theme. Since 2009, the same song is re-adopted as the theme song of Police Report, but sung by Hacken Lee. Televised job advertisements for the Hong Kong Police also adopted segments of the song.
- According to film critic Danny Leigh of Financial Times, the film Uncharted (2022) has action scenes inspired by Police Story. The film's lead actor Tom Holland confirmed that Jackie Chan was an inspiration for several action scenes.

== See also ==
- List of Hong Kong films
- Hong Kong action cinema
- Jackie Chan filmography
