= Project A Part II =

1987 Hong Kong film by Jackie Chan

- Hong Kong film poster

Chinese name
- Traditional Chinese: A計劃續集
- Simplified Chinese: A计划续集
Transcriptions
Standard Mandarin
- Hanyu Pinyin: A Jìhuà Xùjí
Yue: Cantonese
- Jyutping: A Gai3 Waak6 Zuk6 Zaap6
- Directed by: Jackie Chan
- Written by: Jackie Chan; Edward Tang
- Produced by: Raymond Chow; Leonard Ho; Edward Tang
- Starring: Jackie Chan; Maggie Cheung; Bill Tung; Rosamund Kwan
- Cinematography: Cheung Yiu-tsou
- Edited by: Peter Cheung Yiu-chung
- Music by: Michael Lai
- Distributed by: Golden Harvest; Media Asia
- Release date: 19 August 1987
- Running time: 106 minutes
- Country: Hong Kong
- Language: Cantonese
- Box office: US$18.7 million (est.)

Project A Part II
- Traditional Chinese: A計劃續集
- Simplified Chinese: A计划续集
- Literal meaning: "Plan A – The Sequel"
Transcriptions
Standard Mandarin
- Hanyu Pinyin: A Jìhuà Xùjí
Yue: Cantonese
- Jyutping: A Gai3waak6 Zuk6zaap6

Project A Part II (Chinese: A計劃續集; aka Jackie Chan's Project A II; released in the Philippines as Super Fighter) is a 1987 Hong Kong action film starring and directed by Jackie Chan. It co-stars Maggie Cheung, Bill Tung, and Rosamund Kwan. It is the sequel to the 1983 film Project A. Chan plays Sergeant Dragon Ma once again, but his co-stars from the previous film, Sammo Hung and Yuen Biao, are both absent. The film was released theatrically in Hong Kong on 19 August 1987.

== Plot ==
Continuing from where the first film left off, the pirates vow that they must kill Dragon Ma for revenge. On recommendation of the Chief Inspector of Marine Force, Dragon Ma is transferred to be in charge of the district of Sai Wan after the Inspector, Chun, is thought to be staging his arrests. Though Chun has an excellent record, the "criminals" he has been engaging are shot and killed, so there is no evidence against him.

Dragon Ma and his subordinates meet Yesan and her cousin, Carina, at a teahouse. He learns that Carina is a member of the Chinese revolutionaries headed by Dr Sun Yat-sen. Dragon identifies himself as the new Inspector of Sai Wan Police Station, after realizing that all of his policemen except one has been taking bribes. Ho, the only upright policeman around, tells them that a gangster named Tiger Ow with gambling dens and other illegal businesses is the kingpin of the town.

As his men at the police station are too cowardly, Dragon is forced to confront Tiger with only Ho and the three friends he brought with him from the Marine Police. Following a big fight where the policemen are badly outnumbered, the Marine Police show up with guns and force the gangsters to surrender. After one last fight with Ow, all the gangsters are sent to prison, inspiring the police at the station to do a better job.

Dragon is put in charge of the Governor's security for a birthday ball he is throwing for his adopted daughter. Chun collaborates with a group of revolutionaries to implicate Dragon in a theft of the Governor's diamond pendant, and Dragon is arrested. After the ball, Carina is kidnapped by agents of the Empress Dowager, who are working with Chun; they trap her in a wardrobe at Yesan's house. Yesan, Li, Ma, and Ho arrive. Li hides but ends up threatened by one of the imperial agents. Ma and Ho, who are handcuffed together, enter the bathroom. While they are in the bathroom, the chief inspector arrives.

As Yesan hangs up his uniform, Ma and Ho see the keys to the handcuffs. They break free and hide under the bed, losing the key to the handcuffs. They see the Imperial Agents with Carina in the wardrobe. Yesan and the chief inspector sit down to talk. The chief inspector demonstrates how to handcuff two people by handcuffing himself to the armchair but can not break free. Chun arrives to visit Yesan, and the chief inspector hides under the bed, where he sees Ma and Ho. Yesan finally gets Chun to get out of her house, when Ma, Ho, Tung and Yesan defeat the Imperial agents. Eventually the Imperial Agents are arrested, the revolutionary chief escapes, and Dragon is handcuffed by Chun so that he can be brought to the main prison. Carina flees town with the help of the revolutionaries. Chun arranges for Dragon to be killed by a prison warden.

The pirates attack both Dragon and Chun with axes, but they are eventually driven off after the police show up. Dragon is handed over to the prison warden, tied up in a sack, and thrown into the sea. The revolutionaries save Dragon and take him back to their hideout above a medicine store, where they try to enlist him. Dragon refuses to actively help them, saying that he is just a Hong Kong cop. The head of the pirates falls sick and the pirates enter the medicine store to ask for some herbs. Dragon intervenes and offers to pay for their medicine, causing the pirates to think much better of him.

The Imperial agents arrive and apprehend most of the revolutionaries, to gain possession of the black book. Dragon helps Yessan and Miss Pak escape while safeguarding the book. After a frantic run and fight, he defeats them with the help of the pirates. The chief inspector arrives with a huge police cohort and orders the arrest of inspector Chun, now fully aware Chun is trying to murder Dragon. Chun tries to run, but a large bamboo-and-wood stage facade falls on Chun while he attempts to retrieve his moneybag. Dragon, on order of the chief inspector, takes charge of the police.

== Cast ==
- Jackie Chan – Sergeant Dragon Ma / Ma Yu-Lung
- Maggie Cheung – Maggie / Yesan
- Bill Tung – Chief Inspector / Chief Tung
- Rosamund Kwan – Miss Pak
- David Lam – Inspector Chun
- Carina Lau – Carina / Beattie
- Ray Lui – Mr. Man Tin-ching
- Chan Wai-man – Tiger Au / Au Sam-Fu, gangster boss
- Regina Kent – Regina, Governor's daughter
- Mars – Mars / Jaws
- Kenny Ho – Shi King Ho
- Božidar Smiljanić - Governor
- Yao Lin Chen – Awesome Wolf
- Chris Li – Mr. D (Ma's sidekick)
- Fan Mei-sheng – Black Bear
- Wang Lung-wei – Bravo Wong
- Hoi Sang Lee – Choy
- Tai Bo – Mr. B
- John Cheung – Bodyguard
- Chen Ti-ko – Python
- Benny Lai – Pirate No. 1
- Rocky Lai – Pirate No. 2
- Johnny Cheung – Pirate No. 3
- Lai Sing-kong – Pirate No. 4
- Frankie Poon – Pirate No. 5
- Sun Wong – Sgt. Ching
- Wan Fat – Wan Sam Mun
- Len Wen-wei – Sung
- Ben Lam – Brawns
- Lo Wai-kwong – Brains
- Anthony Chan – Cop #365
- Nicky Li – Hotel Receptionist
- Kwan Hoi-san – Chi
- Lau Siu-ming – The Prince
- Isabela Wong – Winnie Chi
- Ricky Hui – Cop #364
- Alan Chui Chung-San – Unknown Cop (cameo)
- Sammo Hung – Fei (opening credit sequence)
- Yuen Biao – Captain Tzu (opening credit sequence)
- Dick Wei – San Pao (cameo) (opening credit sequence in film)

== Production notes ==
- Sammo Hung and Yuen Biao did not appear in the Project A sequel because they were shooting the film Eastern Condors (1987). Cheung Wing-fat, Kenny Ho and Chris Li appeared in both films.
- The scene in Maggie's house is an homage to the scene in the 1935 Marx Brothers film A Night at the Opera in which several characters were crammed into a small cabin on a ship. The scene in which the wall falls on Jackie but he escapes injury because he is standing exactly where the window of the wall lands is taken from Buster Keaton's Steamboat Bill, Jr.. The handcuff sequence was inspired by a segment Jackie saw on the news magazine 60 Minutes.

== Box office ==
At the Hong Kong box office, the film grossed HK$31,459,916 (US$4,034,357). In Taiwan, it was the fourth highest-grossing film of 1987, earning NT$19,936,980 (US$697,097).

In Japan, it was the sixth highest-grossing foreign film of 1987, earning ¥1.91 billion (US$13.2 million). In South Korea, it was the second highest-grossing film of 1987, with 176,273 ticket sales in Seoul City, equivalent to an estimated ₩616,956,000 (US$750,036). This adds up to an estimated total gross of approximately US$18,681,490 in East Asia.

The film was released in the Philippines by Asia Films Exchange as Super Fighter on 3 December 1987.

== Reception ==
Rotten Tomatoes, a review aggregator, reports that 71% of seven surveyed critics gave the film a positive review; the average rating was 6.5/10. David Beamish of DVDactive rated it 6/10 stars and recommended it to fans of the first film. J. Doyle Wallis of DVD Talk rated it 3.5/5 stars and called it one of the better films in his career. Mike Pinsky of DVD Verdict called it a "time filler" for Chan that does not live up to the previous film.

=== Accolades ===
- 1988 Hong Kong Film Awards
  - Won: Best Action Choreography
  - Nominated: Best Film Editing (Peter Cheung)

== Other media ==
The video game Project A2: Shijousaidai no Hyouteki (プロジェクトA2史上最大の標的) is a tie-in for the movie. It was developed and published by Pony Canyon for the MSX2 computer line.

== See also ==
- Jackie Chan filmography
- List of Hong Kong films
