= Bill Tung =

Hong Kong actor and horse racing commentator

- Born: 朱文彪 (Chu Man Biu); March 30, 1933; British Hong Kong
- Died: February 22, 2006 (aged 72); Hong Kong
- Years active: 1967–1996

Chinese name
- Traditional Chinese: 董驃
- Simplified Chinese: 董骠
Transcriptions

William Tung Biu (Chinese: 董驃) (March 30, 1933 in Hong Kong — February 22, 2006) was a Hong Kong actor and horse racing commentator. Tung started off as a jockey with his family racing horse stable. He was then recruited to become a horse racing commentator. Due to his fame, he was invited to act in many movies beginning in the late 1970s. He appeared in several films with Jackie Chan during the 1980s and 1990s, such as playing Inspector "Uncle" Bill Wong in the original Police Story series, including his final movie role in Police Story 4: First Strike in 1996. Tung retired from horse racing commentating in 2000. Tung died in 2006 of lung failure.

== Biography ==
Tung was born in Hong Kong in 1933. He started to learn horse riding when he was eight years old. He became an official horse jockey when he was twelve after graduating from the first post war Hong Kong Jockey Club training. In his short horse jockey career, he went to Singapore, United Kingdom and other countries as a professional horse jockey. After learning to be a horse trainer, Tung served in his family's stables as a vice-horse trainer.

In 1967, when Rediffusion Television (now Asia Television) began broadcasting horse racing, Tung was recruited to become a horse racing commentator. Due to his frank assessment and criticism in the horse racing circles, he was respectfully called "Uncle Biu"（彪叔）. Due to the loss of broadcasting rights, Tung was not able to continue as a commentator on television and he joined the Hong Kong Jockey Club as a radio show host. It had an effect on the radio industry as the listenership for Radio Television Hong Kong increased significantly.

After 1997, when Asia Television lost the horse racing broadcasting rights, Tung went to the Macau Jockey Club as a horse trainer. In his first year as a trainer, Tung won 64 races with the horses from his stables. He also worked as a horse racing commentator in Macau until 2000. He returned to Hong Kong as a horse racing commentator for the 2003–04 horse racing season.

In July 2005, Tung retired from the media industry due to heart disease. He had been hospitalized several times due to diabetes and heart disease. On February 16, 2006, Tung was admitted to St. Paul's Hospital on Hong Kong Island due to physical discomfort. On February 22 at 11 pm, due to pulmonary fibrosis leading to organ failure, Tung died in the hospital in the company of loved ones, at the age of 72.

A funeral committee was set up and Tung's wake was held on March 13, 2006, at 4 pm at the Hong Kong Coliseum. Actor and good friend Jackie Chan was one of the pallbearers. In the afternoon the next day, Tung was cremated at Sha Tin's crematorium.

From his four marriages, Tung had five children. His three daughters are married. Both of his sons died, one at a young age, and his second of cancer.

== Filmography ==
- Luan long bo meng (1977) as himself
- Fatherland (1980, TV series) as Yung Hok-ling
- Security Unlimited (1981) as Racetrack Announcer
- The Legendary Fok (1981, TV series) as Fok Yan-tai
- Coolie Killer (1982)
- My Darling, My Goddess (1982) as Don Phew
- Tian ji guo he (1983)
- The Fung-shui Master (1983)
- Fast Fingers (1983) as Uncle Bill
- Esprit d'amour (1983) as Chi-Ming's Father
- Family Light Affair (1984)
- I Love Lolanto (1984)
- I Will Finally Knock You Down, Dad! (1984) as Monk
- My Little Sentimental Friend (1984)
- Mummy Dearest (1985) as Inspector Bill
- Police Story (1985) as Inspector Bill Wong
- Tian guan ci fu (1985) as Ji Xiao Dong
- Happy Din Don (1986) as Ma Masa, the Crocodile King
- Devoted to You (1986) as Television Racing Commentator
- Jiang shi shao ye (1986)
- It's a Mad, Mad, Mad World (1987) as Bill
- Sworn Brothers (1987)
- Enchanting Night (1987) as Uncle Hak
- Project A II (1987) as Police Commissioner
- Mr. Handsome (1987) as Bill Lau
- Who Is the Craftiest (1988) as Leung Piu
- The Good, the Bad and the Beauty (1988) as Uncle Mark
- Dian zhi zei zei (1988)
- Bless This House (1988) as Bill Chang
- The Inspector Wears Skirts (1988) as Commissioner Tung
- Double Fattiness (1988) as Mo Chak-shu
- Ling huan xiao jie (1988) as Master Wong
- Mother vs. Mother (1988) as Dut-Hing
- Shen tan fu zi bing (1988)
- Police Story 2 (1988) as Bill Wong
- Tong tian pai dang (1988)
- Imaginary Suspense (1988) as Shek Man-Tau
- It's a Mad, Mad, Mad World II (1988) as Bill
- The Inspector Wears Skirts II (1989) as Commissioner Tung
- It's a Mad, Mad, Mad World III (1989) as Bill
- Xiao xiao xiao jing cha (1989)
- Mr Canton and Lady Rose (1989) as Tung
- My Dear Son (1989) as Ho Ka-chai
- Fu gui kai xin gui (1989)
- Tragic Heroes (1989) as Uncle Gwai
- The Final Judgement (1989) as Officer Kent Chan
- Ghostly Vixen (1990) as Wizard
- Look Out, Officer! (1990) as Chang Piao
- Xi huan de gu shi (1990)
- Si ren xin shi jie (1990)
- Doctor's Heart (1990) as Man-Tsun's Father
- The Banquet (1991) as Uncle Bill
- Hong Kong Eva (1992)
- It's a Mad, Mad, Mad World Too (1992) as Bill
- Freedom Run Q (1992)
- Police Story 3 (1992) as 'Uncle' Bill Wong
- Meng qing ren (1993)
- Once a Cop (1993)
- Police Story 3 Part 2 (1993) as Uncle Bill
- Drunken Master II (1994) as General (uncredited)
- Ma shen (1994)
- Rumble in the Bronx (1995) as Uncle Bill
- Police Story 4: First Strike (1996) as 'Uncle' Bill Wong (final film role)
