= Stanley Tong =

Hong Kong film director

- Tong at the 37th Tokyo International Film Festival in 2024
- Born: 7 April 1960 (age 66); British Hong Kong
- Occupations: Film director; film producer; stunt choreographer; screenwriter; entrepreneur; philanthropist
- Years active: 1991–present
- Awards: Hong Kong Film Awards – Best Action Choreography; 1996 Rumble in the Bronx; 1997 Police Story 4: First Strike Golden Horse Awards – Best Action Choreography; 1997 Police Story 4: First Strike

Stanley Tong
- Traditional Chinese: 唐季禮
- Simplified Chinese: 唐季礼
Transcriptions
Standard Mandarin
- Hanyu Pinyin: Táng Jìlǐ
Yue: Cantonese
- Jyutping: tong4 gwai3 lai5

Stanley Tong Gwai-lai (Chinese: 唐季禮; born 7 April 1960) is a Hong Kong filmmaker. He is known for directing action-adventure films, including several with Jackie Chan.

== Early life ==
Stanley Tong was born on 7 April 1960, in Hong Kong, and he completed his education in Hong Kong and Canada. Tong studied at the University of Manitoba.

== Film career ==
Encouraged by his brother-in-law in Hong Kong, who was a filmmaker, Tong started his film career there in 1979 by working behind the scenes in films. In 1991, Tong directed his first film, the self-funded Stone Age Warriors. The film received critical acclaim from some famous film critics, which attracted the attention of Golden Harvest. Tong was then invited to join the company as a film director.

Tong is very well known for his action movies. Working closely with Jackie Chan, Stanley directed some very popular movies in the 1990s. Their first collaboration, Police Story 3: Super Cop (1992), broke box office records in many Asian countries and received a nomination for Best Film at the Golden Horse Awards. Tong's other movies with Jackie Chan, such as Rumble in the Bronx (1995) and Police Story 4: First Strike (1996), also created significant box office records, the latter grossing HK$57,518,795, the highest box office return for a local film in Hong Kong until 2001. Also, the release of Rumble in the Bronx in the United States helped Jackie Chan make a name for himself in Hollywood.

Tong customarily attempts stunts himself before asking actors to risk themselves, e.g., Jackie Chan's leap from a parking garage roof to a fire escape in Rumble in the Bronx and the finale of Stone Age Warriors.

During his stay in Hollywood, Tong also filmed his only English language non-martial arts film Mr. Magoo (1997), which was a critical and commercial failure, and Martial Law (1998), which was a moderate critical success. He was also in talks to direct a live-action adaption of Sailor Moon, under Disney, however, the film was scrapped very early on.

In 2000, Tong returned to Shanghai, in hopes to inspire the future generation of filmmakers in China. After his long absence away from home, Tong directed his first film in his homeland, China Strike Force. In 2005, Tong wrote and directed the film The Myth. In the same year, Tong also helped produce Asia's first 3D CGI animated film, DragonBlade: The Legend of Lang.

In recent years, Tong has produced a number of films, including the films The Myth (2005) and CZ12 (2012), as well as the TV series Fall in Love with You (2012) and The Patriot Yue Fei (2013).

Apart from filmmaking, Tong has been active with charity work both in USA and China. He also works as a guest lecturer in Chinese institutions to help cultivate the nation's future filmmakers.

== Filmography ==
Film

- Stone Age Warriors (1991)
- Police Story 3: Super Cop (1992)
- Supercop 2 (1993)
- Rumble in the Bronx (1995)
- Police Story 4: First Strike (1996)
- Mr. Magoo (1997)
- China Strike Force (2000)
- The Myth (2005)
- CZ12 (2012)
- The Extreme Fox (2014)
- Kung Fu Yoga (2017) starring Jackie Chan
- Vanguard (2020)
- Rising Shaolin: The Protector (2021)
- A Legend (2024)

Television

- Martial Law (1998) (Episodes "Shanghai Express" and "This Shogun for Hire")
- Ambition (壮志雄心) (2002)
- Boy & Girl (2004)
- Water Beauty (2005)
- The Myth (2010, credited as creative director)
- Fall in Love with You (2012)
- The Patriot Yue Fei (2013)

== Entrepreneurship ==
In 2001, Tong formed his own production company, China International Media Group Ltd. Many of his films are partly financed by the company. In addition, the company has invested in a stunt performers' training program. Both local and foreign lecturers who are well known in the industry have been invited to give lessons for the program, and the best students receive opportunities to play in films invested by Tong's company.

== Other work ==
In 2012, Tong was invited by The 15th Shanghai International Film Festival's SIFFORUM as a guest speaker. At the forum titled "Far East Dream Factory - Future for Chinese Film Industry Upgrading", Tong shared his views with other panelists in the industry. In 2011, Tong took the role of Honored Consultant for the Film and TV Association of China Public Security Ministry. The Association is established to produce films and TV series featuring crime stories.

In 2008, Tong appeared as a guest judge on the China Beijing TV Station reality television series The Disciple, which aired in Mainland China and was produced by, and features, Jackie Chan. The purpose of the program was to find a new star, skilled in acting and martial arts, to become Chan's "successor", the champion being awarded the lead role in a film. It concluded on June 7, 2008, with the series winner being announced in Beijing.

== Philanthropy ==
Stanley Tong has organized many charitable activities and has received numerous awards for his contributions to the charity work. Some of them include:

- "Charity Hero" medal for organizing Hong Kong Yan Chai Hospital fundraising activities
- The President of Fundraising Activities for the Elderly in San Francisco, USA
- The Fundraising Ambassador of the Los Angeles branch of the Eastern China Flood Fundraising Committee
- The Fundraising President of the Hong Kong Disabled Youth Association and the Hong Kong Blind People Association
- Organized fundraising activities for the victims of China's Sichuan earthquake
