= Hogg Memorial Auditorium =

Auditorium in Austin, Texas, U.S.

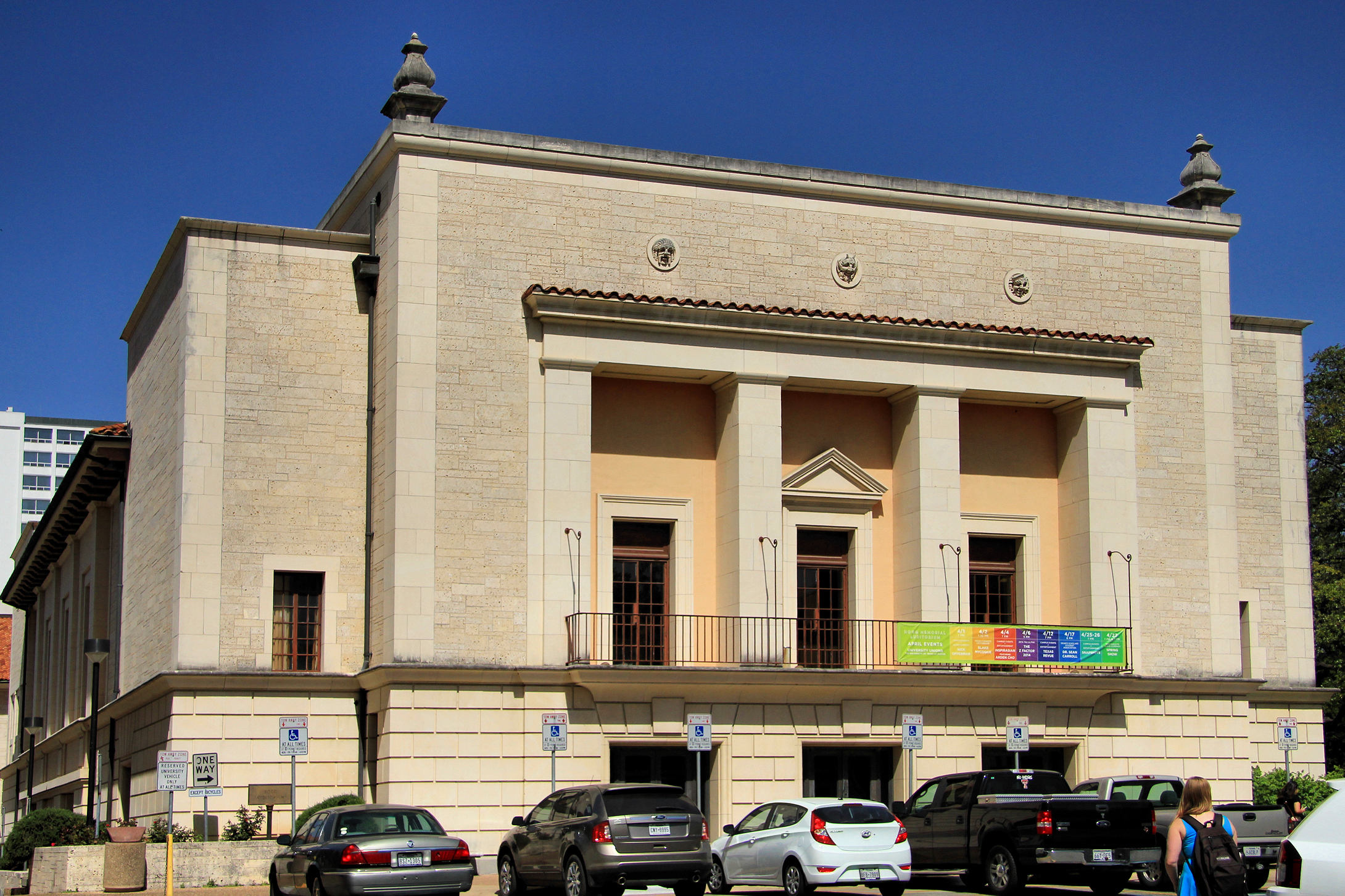
- The building's exterior in 2014

- Location within Texas

General information
- Location: 2300 Whitis Avenue, Austin, Texas, United States
- Coordinates: 30.2869°N 97.7406°W
- Named for: Jim Hogg
- Completed: 1933
- Renovated: 2021–2023

Technical details
- Floor count: 3

Design and construction
- Architect: Paul Philippe Cret

Renovating team
- Architect: McKinney York Architects
- Structural engineer: Jacobs Engineering Group

Other information
- Seating capacity: 1,200

Hogg Memorial Auditorium is a theater located on the University of Texas at Austin campus in Austin, Texas, United States. The venue was the first theater at the university's campus when it was constructed in 1933.

Designed by French-born Philadelphia architect Paul Cret, the auditorium was named after James Stephen Hogg, the 20th governor of Texas.

The auditorium was renovated in the period 2021–2023.
