= Police Story 2013 =

- Film poster
- Traditional Chinese: 警察故事2013
- Simplified Chinese: 警察故事2013
- Hanyu Pinyin: Jǐng Chá Gù Shì Èr Líng Yī Sān
- Jyutping: Ging2 Caat3 Gu3 Si6 Ji6 Ling4 Jat1 Saam1
- Directed by: Ding Sheng
- Screenplay by: Ding Sheng; Wei Yahui; Xu Yang; Alex Jia
- Story by: Chao Lv; Chen Shuying; Gao Ying; Gao Huijuan; He Jianai
- Produced by: Jerry Ye
- Starring: Jackie Chan; Liu Ye; Jing Tian
- Cinematography: Ding Yu
- Edited by: Ding Sheng; Ismael Gomez III
- Music by: Lao Zai
- Production companies: China Film Group Corporation; China Vision Group; Prosperity Pictures; Wanda Media Co.
- Distributed by: Jackie & JJ International (Worldwide); Emperor Motion Pictures (Hong Kong)
- Release dates: 24 December 2013 (China); 16 January 2014 (Hong Kong)
- Running time: 108 minutes
- Countries: China; Hong Kong
- Language: Mandarin
- Budget: US$35 million
- Box office: US$94.2 million

Police Story 2013 (also known as Police Story: Lockdown) is a 2013 neo-noir action thriller film directed and written by Ding Sheng. A Chinese-Hong Kong co-production, it stars Jackie Chan in another reboot of the Police Story film series. The film is directed by Ding Sheng, who previously helmed Chan's Little Big Soldier. Unlike the previous Police Story films where he portrays a Hong Kong cop, Chan instead portrays a mainland Chinese officer.

Like New Police Story, 2013 is a stand-alone installment with a darker tone than the previous installments, which were more comedic. It is the sixth and most recent installment of the series.

== Plot ==
Detective Zhong Wen heads to Wu Bar in search of his estranged daughter, Miao Miao, who is now the girlfriend of the nightclub's owner, Wu Jiang. However, Zhong disapproves of Miao's relationship, which leads to an argument between the father and daughter. Before Zhong can make amends with Miao, he is struck in the head by an unnamed assailant, in a plot orchestrated by Wu. Regaining consciousness, Zhong finds himself strapped onto a chair, and his hands bound by metal wires. He deduces that Wu was after him all along, but cannot conclude. Zhong also learns that the other bar patrons, including his daughter are being held captive.

Wu phones the local Lieutenant and demands a hefty ransom as well as an audience with prisoner Wei Xiaofu, before leaving the room Zhong is trapped in. Zhong breaks free of the wires and escapes from the room. Scouring the bar undetected, he finds Wu's secret chamber, which is predominantly filled with posters of a teenage girl and a younger Wu, who once went by the moniker "Spider" when he was a kickboxer. He also spots blueprints of the bar and discerns that Wu intends to bomb the entire bar should his kidnapping ploy fail. Through Miao, Zhong obtains a cell phone, which he uses to contact the lieutenant.

Wu soon discovers that Zhong has fled the hostage room. Wu grabs Miao and threaten to dip her hand in a fish tank full of piranhas, forcing Zhong to reveal his hiding place. Recaptured, Zhong offers an impatient Wu his assistance in finding Wei, who has yet to arrive. Wu agrees and gives Zhong two options — defeat one of his henchmen in a battle and be allowed to free three hostages, or admit defeat and find Wei alone. Zhong relents, agreeing to fight. With perseverance, and somehow unbreaking his broken finger, Zhong emerges as victor. Zhong then convinces a reluctant Wei Xiaofu to enter the bar with him.

Back in Wu Bar, Wu Jiang reveals the reason behind the kidnapping: he intends to exact revenge on Zhong, Wei, and three other hostages, all of whom were coincidentally witnesses to Wu's younger sister's death. On that fateful day, Wei had wanted to steal medicine for his mother at a pharmacy. Wu's sister was also at the drug store. When Wei's theft is discovered, he panics and holds Wu's sister at knifepoint. It transpires that she had been pregnant and, due to stress, had committed suicide by slashing her own neck with Wei's weapon. Zhong, who was driving back home, happened to pass by the crime scene, but could not save her.

Suddenly, a worker of Wu (the bartender) reveals himself to be Wu's sister's boyfriend. He reveals that he was trying to get through the crowd of police, but fails, and watches his girlfriend die. The bartender tries to shoot himself, but Zhong stops him and holds on to his arm. As Wu digests the truth, police forces storm into the bar. The bombs set in place by Wu go off and very few criminals flee through an underground escape route. The rest are gunned down. In the ensuing confusion, Wu leaves with Miao. Zhong gives chase and the trio end up in a subway tunnel. Wu offers Zhong an ultimatum: shoot himself and his daughter lives, or shoot Wu and his knife will slice Miao's neck and she will die.

Zhong chooses the former but realises after pulling the trigger that the gun is unloaded. Wu informs Zhong that he has passed his test and in doing so, has earned his respect. Wu returns Miao to Zhong and prepares to let an oncoming train hit him. Zhong tries to stop him, but gets shot and is unable to stop his suicidal act in time but luckily, the train switches tracks just as it is about to collide with Wu. It is then revealed that the lieutenant changed the tracks. Wu is apprehended, while Zhong is sent to the hospital to heal his wounds. Zhong reconciles with his daughter in the ambulance and the SWAT captain hands him a spider medallion as a parting gift from Wu.

== Cast ==
- Jackie Chan as Detective Zhong Wen
- Liu Ye as Wu Jiang
- Jing Tian as Miao Miao
- Yin Tao as Lan Lan
- Liu Yiwei as Chief Niu
- Zhou Xiaoou as Wei Xiaofu
- Yu Rongguang as Captain Wu
- Zhang Lei as Quanzi
- Liu Peiqi as Chief Zhang
- Wang Zhifei as Officer Fang
- Zhang Xiaoning as Wu's father
- Zha Ka (aka Han Feixing) as Bin Ge
- Guli Nazha as Xiao Wei
- Wu Yue as Yue
- Liu Hailong as Pizhong
- Na Wei as Na Na
- Cai An as Kun
- Ding Sheng as truck driver

== Production ==
Filming of Police Story 2013 began in November 2012 in Beijing. To prepare for his role, Chan cut his hair short to fit the look of a mainland officer. About his new role, Chan posted on his Sina Weibo account saying:

I’ve played policemen many times before, but I’ve never shot a film which focused on the life of a mainland policeman. So this time, I get the chance to fulfill this kind of role.

Filming wrapped on in February 2013 and post-production began, with the actors re-recording their dialogue.

== Release ==
A public screening of Police Story 2013 was held at the 2013 Beijing International Film Festival in April. Chan also promoted the film at the 2013 Cannes Film Festival in May. The film was released in China on 24 December the same year.

The film was distributed as Police Story: Lockdown in the United States by Well Go USA Entertainment, and released in June 2015.

== Reception ==
Initial response for 2013 were generally mixed. Review aggregation website Rotten Tomatoes gives the film a score of 14% based on 7 reviews. It has a 44% rating on Metacritic, indicating "mixed or average reviews".

== See also ==
- Jackie Chan filmography
- List of Hong Kong films of 2013
