= Supercop 2 =

1993 Hong Kong film by Stanley Tong

- 1993 Hong Kong theatrical poster
- Directed by: Stanley Tong
- Written by: Stanley Tong; Sandy Shaw
- Produced by: Barbie Tung; So Haau Leung
- Starring: Michelle Yeoh; Yu Rongguang; Emil Chau; Jackie Chan
- Cinematography: Ardy Lam
- Edited by: Peter Cheung; Cheung Ka-fai
- Music by: Richard Lo
- Production companies: Golden Harvest; Golden Way Films Ltd.
- Distributed by: Gala Film Distribution Limited
- Release date: 21 October 1993
- Running time: 104 minutes
- Country: British Hong Kong
- Language: Cantonese
- Box office: HK$9,337,853

Supercop 2 (Chinese: 超級計劃) is a 1993 Hong Kong action film directed by Stanley Tong and starring Michelle Yeoh. It is a spin-off of Jackie Chan's Police Story film series involving the character Yeoh portrayed in Supercop.

Although Jackie Chan only has a cameo appearance in this film, some DVD covers prominently featured Chan, misleading audiences into thinking he is one of the main characters. He reprises his role as Inspector Chan, but in drag to catch a criminal in drag wearing the same wig and clothes.

== Plot ==
After the mission from Supercop, Inspector Yang participates in neutralizing a terrorist incident during which she narrowly survives, and is awarded the Highest Distinction for the mission. Her boyfriend Chang, a war veteran who works as a security guard and bravely helped Yang in her mission, is frustrated that Yang gets a mere medal for risking her life. Growing disillusioned with the prospects in Mainland China, the ambitious Chang leaves for Hong Kong, promising to one day come back a millionaire and marry Yang.

Some time later, the Hong Kong police encounters a heavily armed gang of highly trained robbers. Suspecting them to be ex-militaries from the Mainland, the police asked for assistance from the Chinese Public Security. Yang is dispatched to Hong Kong to provide intelligence sharing, working with Inspector Lee, who has an awkward crush on Yang.

Yang helps Lee track down the robbers' safehouse. Although the robbers have rigged explosives in the building to ambush the police, Chang, who leads the gang, hesitates after seeing Yang, resulting in one of their member being killed and another arrested. In order to free the arrested man, who is a demolition specialist crucial to an upcoming heist, Chang contacts Yang and rekindles their relationship, and manages to stage a successful breakout. Yang suspects Chang's part in the crime, but cannot bring herself to accuse Chang. She is then ordered to return to Mainland, although she convinces Lee to let her stay on the case.

The robbers then perform a daring heist on the Central Bank, masterminded by Roger Davidson, the designer of the Bank's vault security. After successfully breaking into the vault, Davidson double-crosses Chang's gang. Chang survives the betrayal and chases down Davidson's crew in an underwater subway tunnel, killing Davidson's men and mortally wounding Davidson. Yang, who has infiltrated the bank during the heist, arrives and confronts Chang, trying to convince him to surrender. When Chang is distracted by Yang, the dying Davidson detonates a bomb, causing the tunnel to flood. Knowing his injury will only hinder their survival, Chang pushes Yang and Lee past the lock gate, sacrificing his own life for the person he loved.

== Cast ==
- Michelle Yeoh as Interpol Inspector Jessica Yang Jian-wa / Jessica Yang Cien-hua
- Yu Rongguang (as Yu Rong Guang) as David Chang Fung, Vietnam veteran and Yang's ex-boyfriend
- Emil Chau as RHKP Inspector Martin Lee Kwong-ming
- Athena Chu as Annie May Lee, Lee's younger sister
- Louis Fan (as Fan Sui Wong) as Alan Kwok Shao-long, Lee's partner and May's boyfriend
- Bill Tung as "Uncle" Bill Wong, RHKP deputy commissioner
- Alain Guernier as Roger Davidson, designer of the Central Bank Vault
- Bowie Lam as George Ho Chu, Chang's right-hand man
- Dick Wei as Ah Shuen / Chuen
- Joe Cheung as Jewelry shop manager / Fung's Man in Hospital (2 roles)
- Chan Mei-kei as Bank manager
- Yukari Oshima as Red Terrorist at the Beginning
- Mars as Jewelry Store Customer
- Alien Sit as Po
- Sam Wong as Chun
- Bruce Law as Ping
- Jackie Chan as Inspector "Kevin" Chan Ka-Kui (cameo)
- Eric Tsang as Jewel Robbing Leader (cameo)
- Jon M. Chu

== Alternative titles ==
- (original title)
  - Chiu kup gai wak
- Argentina
  - Projecto S
- Australia
  - Project S
- Brazil (video title)
  - Policial Acima de Tudo
- Brazil
  - Police Story 3, Parte 2: Policial Acima de Tudo
- Canada (French title)
  - Chiu kup gai wak
- Canada (English title)
  - Supercop 2
- China (Cantonese title) (poster title)
  - 超級警察2 超級計劃
- Denmark (video title)
  - Once a Cop
- Finland
  - Once a Cop
- France
  - Project S
- France (video box title)
  - Supercop 2
- Germany
  - Mega Cop
- Greece
  - Supercop 2
- Hong Kong (English title)
  - Project S
- Hong Kong (English title) (series title)
  - Police Story 3: Supercop 2
- Hong Kong (Mandarin title)
  - Chao ji ji hua
- Hungary
  - Volt egyszer egy zsaru
- Japan
  - プロジェクトS
- Japan (Rōmaji title)
  - Purojekuto S
- New Zealand (English title)
  - Project S
- Philippines (English title)
  - Supercop 2
- Poland
  - Policyjna opowieść 4: Projekt S
- Romania
  - Supercop
- Russia
  - Супер полицейский 2
- Slovenia
  - Projekt S
- Spain
  - Supercop 2
- Sweden
  - Once a Cop
- UK
  - Project S
- UK (video box title)
  - Project S: Police Story 4
- USA
  - Supercop 2
- USA (alternative title)
  - Once a Cop
- International (English title) (alternative title)
  - Project S
- International (English title)
  - Supercop 2

== Box office ==
In Hong Kong, the film grossed HK$9,337,853, as of 8 November 1993. In US dollars, this was US$1,207,130 (equivalent to $2,700,000 in 2025).

== See also ==
- Jackie Chan filmography
