= Leonard Ho =

Hong Kong film producer (1925–1998)

Leonard Ho Koon Cheung
- Born: 1925
- Died: 16 February 1998 (aged 71–72); Hong Kong
- Occupation: Film producer
- Years active: 1970–1995

Chinese name
- Chinese: 何冠昌
Transcriptions
Yue: Cantonese
- Jyutping: Ho4 gwun3 coeng1

Leonard Ho (1925 – 16 February 1998) was a Hong Kong film producer.

Ho formed Golden Harvest in 1970, with Raymond Chow, after leaving Shaw Brothers. The first film he produced was A Man Called Tiger from 1973. In 1989, he was nominated for a Hong Kong Film Award for best picture for the movie Painted Faces, which was released in 1988. Later productions credits include Armour of God and Rumble in the Bronx. In the end credits of the 2012 movie CZ12, Jackie Chan cited Leonard Ho as his mentor.

Ho was awarded Hong Kong Film Award for Lifetime Achievement in 1999.
