= Tangxun Lake =

Lake in Wuhan, China

- Tangxun Hu, Tangsun Lake, Tangsun Hu, T’ang-sun Hu
- 汤逊湖 (Chinese)
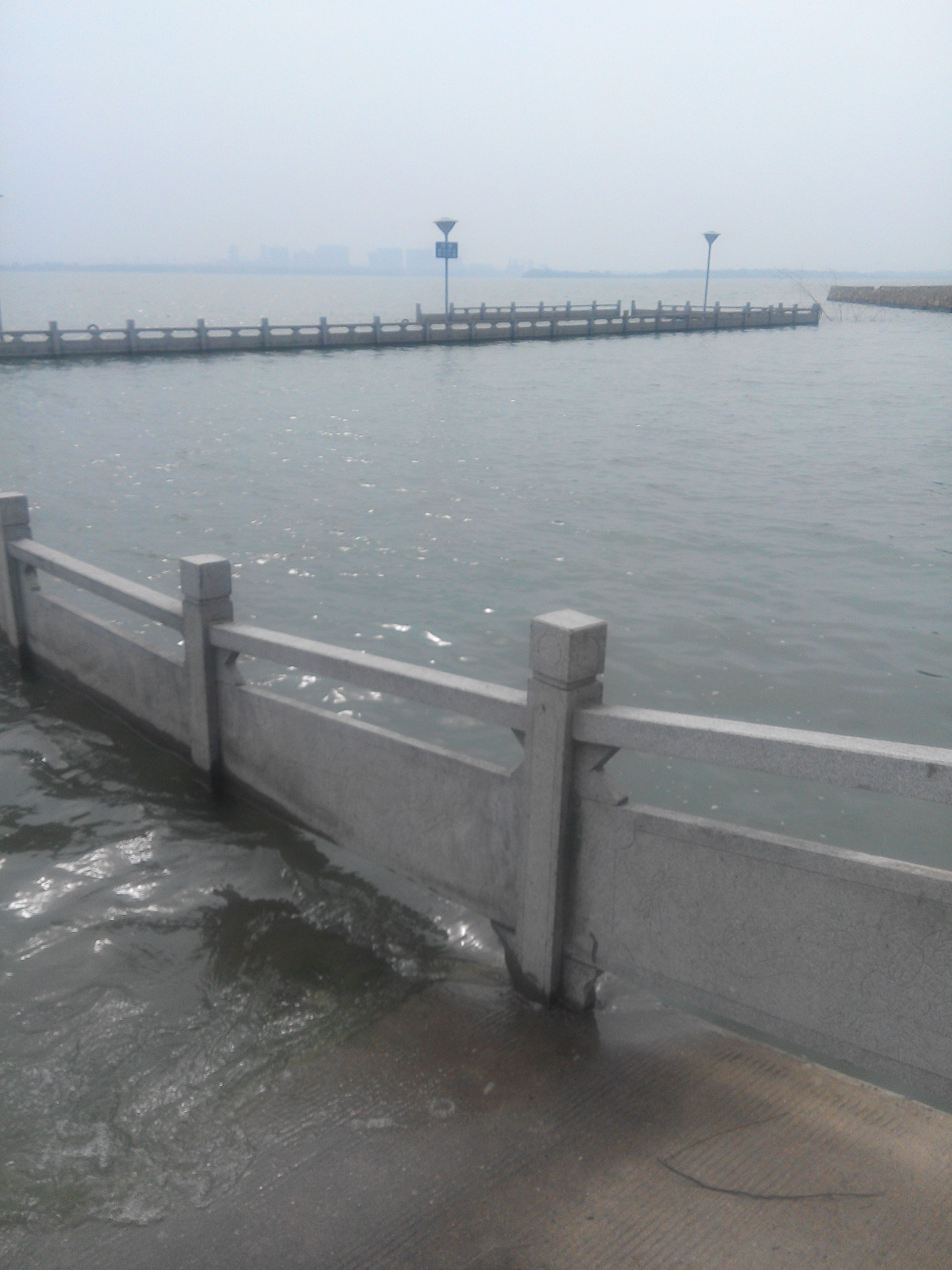

- Location within Hubei
- Location: Hongshan District/Jiangxia District, Wuhan, Hubei
- Coordinates: 30°25′48″N 114°21′00″E
- Part of: Yangtze River Basin
- Basin countries: China
- Surface area: > 47.6 km^{2} (18 sq mi)
- Surface elevation: 10 metres (33 ft)
- Islands: Zanglong Island (藏龙岛)

Tangxun Lake
- Traditional Chinese: 湯遜湖
- Simplified Chinese: 汤逊湖
Transcriptions
Standard Mandarin
- Hanyu Pinyin: Tāngxùn Hú
Yue: Cantonese
- Jyutping: tong^{1}seon^{3} wu^{4}

Tangsun Lake
- Traditional Chinese: 湯孫湖
- Simplified Chinese: 汤孙湖
Transcriptions
Standard Mandarin
- Hanyu Pinyin: Tāngsūn Hú
Yue: Cantonese
- Jyutping: tong^{1}syun^{1} wu^{4}

Tangxun Lake, formerly Tangsun Lake, is a freshwater lake between Hongshan District and Jiangxia District in southeastern Wuhan, the capital of Hubei Province, China. It is south of Wuhan's Third Ring Road and north of its Fourth Ring Road. Tangxun Lake is the largest lake completely enclosed by a city in Asia.

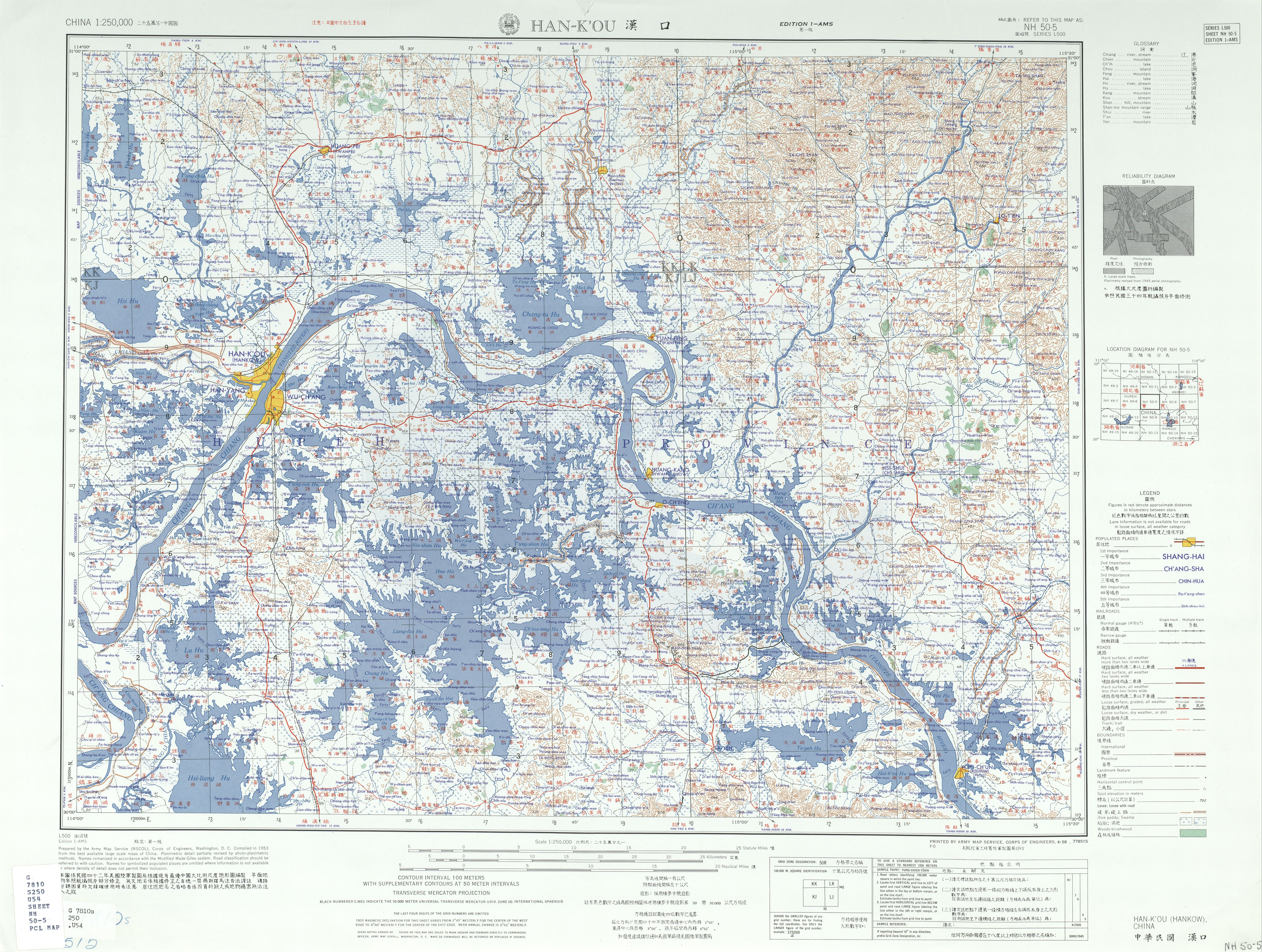
Map including Tangxun Lake (labeled as T’ang-sun Hu 湯孫湖) (1953)

Before a 1997 decision by the Jiangxia District government, Tangxun Lake was called Tang-Sun Lake. According to tradition, two families surnamed Tang and Sun lived in two of the bays of the lake, hence the name Tang-Sun Lake.

As of May 2014, due to the expansion of Wuhan, Tangxun Lake was recognized as the largest lake in Wuhan in the official Wuhan Lake Records (武汉湖泊志). Tangxun Lake surpassed East Lake and claimed the title of the 'Largest Lake entirely within a City in China and Asia'.

Tangxun Lake is the site of recreation and residential areas, including man-made peninsulas extending into the lake. The Tangxun Lake Recreational Area is divided into three recreational areas: 'Rural' Park (including a fishing center); Water Sports Recreation Area (combination of tourism and competitive sports; yacht racing area, rowing center and swimming pool); and Summer Recreational Area, (business center, office buildings, news center, a layer of shopping center, swimming pool, professional training and the gym, etc). The scenic spots are both connected and relatively independent. The Tangxun Lake Resort Area was developed by the Hubei Huatai Land Industry Co., Ltd.

Tangxun Lake Railway Station and Miaoshan Railway Station, located on the northern and southern shores of Tangxun Lake are stops on the Wuhan–Xianning intercity railway.

The Science and Technology Park of Huazhong University of Science and Technology is located on the north shore of Tangxun Lake. Wuhan Donghu University was established on the western shore of Tangxun Lake in 1980. Wuhan Institute of Design and Sciences was established on the eastern shore of Tangxun Lake in 2015.
