= Lin Peng =

Chinese actress

- 林鹏
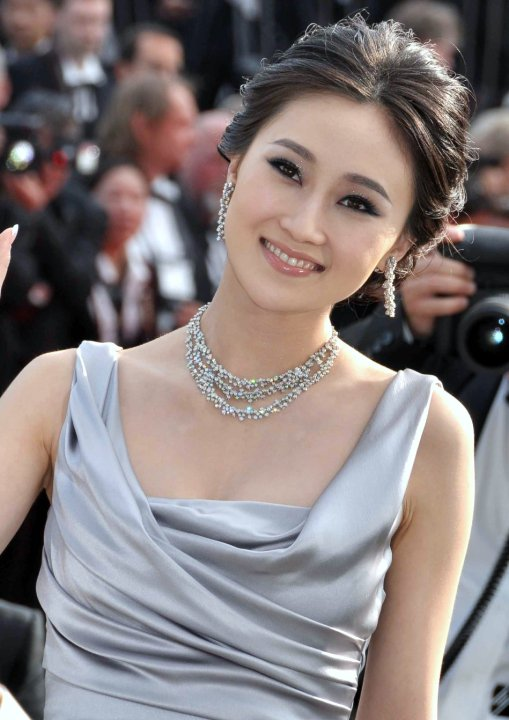
- Peng at the 2010 Cannes Film Festival
- Born: October 25, 1986 (age 39); Dalian, Liaoning
- Education: Central Academy of Drama
- Occupation: Actress
- Years active: 2010–present

Lin Peng (simplified Chinese: 林鹏; traditional Chinese: 林鵬; pinyin: Lín Péng, born October 25, 1986) is a Chinese actress. Peng began her career by appearing in a Jackie Chan film Little Big Soldier.

== Film ==
Year	English title	Chinese title	Role	Notes
2010	Little Big Soldier	大兵小将	Singer	
2011	A Chinese Fairy Tale	倩女幽魂	White Snake spirit	
2011	1911	辛亥革命	Nurse	
2012	The Viral Factor	逆战	Jian Lishan	
2012	Meet the In-Laws	搞定岳父大人	Su Qian	
2012	CZ12	十二生肖		Cameo
2014	The Break-Up Artist	分手达人	Xin Ping	
2015	Dragon Blade	天将雄师	Ling Yue	
2016	Provoking Laughter	冒牌卧底	Ai Da	
2018	Untouchable Love	无法触碰的爱	Liu Ying	
2019	The Knight of Shadows: Between Yin and Yang	神探蒲松龄之兰若仙踪		

=== Television series ===
Year	English title	Chinese title	Role	Notes
2016	Demon Girl	半妖倾城	Cao Yanyan	Cameo
2017	The Song	恋恋阙歌	Qin Kexin	
2017	Love Actually	人间至味是清欢	Lin Yue	
TBA	The Legend of Ba Qing	巴清传	Mi Weiyang	
TBA	Secret Keepers	绝密者	Jiang Wei	
TBA	Black Lighthouse	黑色灯塔		
TBA	Ode to Daughter of Great Tang	大唐女儿行	Consort Wei	
TBA	Stealth Walker	玫瑰行者	Lin Qiang	
TBA	Two Conjectures About Marriage	婚姻的两种猜想	Xue Kexin	

== Discography ==
=== Albums ===
Year	English title	Chinese title	Notes
2010	I'm Lin Peng	我是林鹏	

=== Singles ===
Year	English title	Chinese title	Album	Notes
2011	"Return Tears"	还泪	A Chinese Fairy Tale OST	
2014	"My Love Understands You"	我的爱懂你	The Break-Up Artist OST	with Van Fan

== Awards ==
Year	Award	Category	Nominated work	Ref.
2013	5th Macau International Movie Festival	Outstanding Actress Award	The Viral Factor	
2015	1st Jackie Chan Action Movie Awards	Best Action Movie Actress	Dragon Blade	
