= Yoo Seung-jun =

American singer and actor (born 1976)

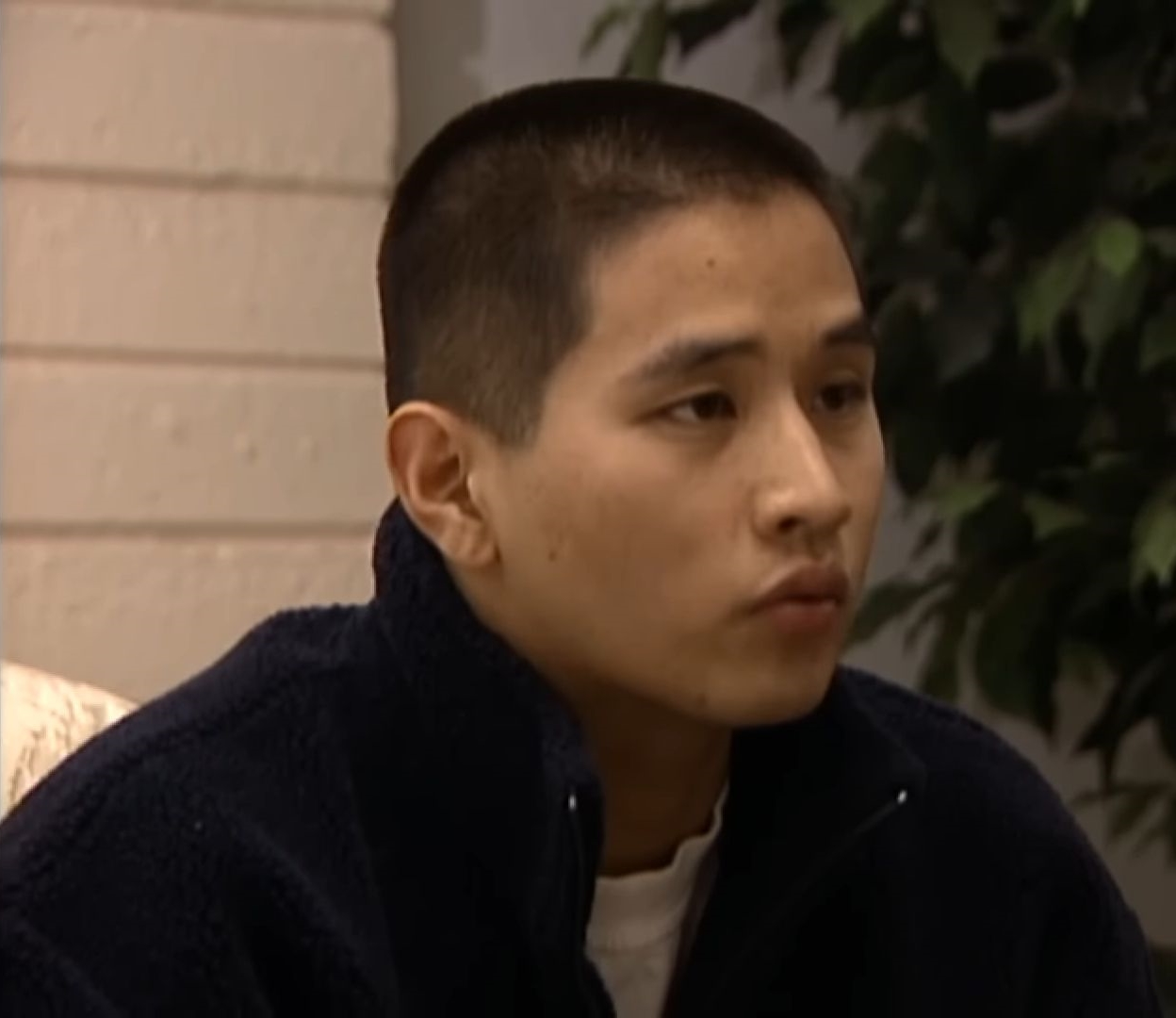
- Yoo on January 31, 2002
- Born: December 15, 1976 (age 49); Seoul, South Korea
- Other names: Yoo Sueng-jun; Steve Sueng Jun Yoo; Steve Yoo
- Citizenship: South Korea (1976–2002); United States (2002–present)
- Musical career
- Origin: Seoul, South Korea
- Genre: K-pop
- Years active: 1997–present

Korean name
- Hangul: 유승준
- Hanja: 劉承埈
- RR: Yu Seungjun
- MR: Yu Sŭngjun

Steve Sueng Jun Yoo (born Yoo Seung-jun on December 15, 1976), is an South Korean-born American singer, rapper and actor. He debuted in South Korea in 1997 with the song "Gawi" and became one of the country's most popular K-pop stars at the time. Within the first five years of his career, Yoo had sold more than 5 million records.

Yoo's career in South Korea ended in 2002 when he was accused of evading South Korean mandatory military service by becoming a U.S. citizen. He was subsequently banned from entering South Korea, becoming the only person in history to be banned from the country for acquiring another citizenship.

Since his banishment from South Korea, Yoo worked as an actor in China. He is best known for his roles as Jin Wuzhu in 2013 historical TV series The Patriot Yue Fei and Prince Wen in 2010 film Little Big Soldier.

== Early life ==
Yoo was born on December 15, 1976, in Seoul, South Korea. He and his family immigrated to the United States when he was thirteen and settled in Buena Park, California. Yoo led a troubled life during his teen years until he joined the church choir, where he found a passion for singing. He made demo tapes of his rapping and dance skills and sent these to Brothers Entertainment, where he was eventually scouted and left California to start his career as a singer.

== Career ==
=== 1997–2002: Debut and early music career ===
Yoo made his South Korean debut as a singer in 1997. His first album West Side was a hit with the debut single "Gawi." Along with another single "I Love You, Noona," he won "Best Newcomer of the Year" at many award ceremonies. Yoo gained popularity with his signature dance move "Gawi," in which he and his backup dancers lined up diagonally to perform the same moves in unison. "West Side" sold a million copies.

In the summer of 1998, he released his second album 1998 V2 for SALE with "Na Na Na" ("나나나") as its lead song, where it and the music video topped the charts. In the video, it featured actress Choi Ji-woo, who played as the internship teacher while he played as the troublesome student. Many consider this album as the most successful of his career, as it won him Best Artist of the Year in multiple award ceremonies. The album again sold 1 million records. In 1999, he went on to release his third album Now Or Never, which contained the hit single "Passion". Later that year, Yoo released his fourth album, "Over and Over," which contained the hit single "Vision."

In 2000, he began to expand his career into China and Taiwan, with the release of the single "Can't Wait", which was a collaboration with Taiwanese singer Yuki. Now or Never topped the South Korean charts with first week sales of 879,000 albums sold. Setting a record for the highest first week sales ever at the time. The album eventually sold close to 1.5 million units. He also released music videos for two of his Korean songs that year for "찾길 바래" (English: "Wish you could find") & "어제 오늘 그리고" (English: "Yesterday, Today & Tomorrow"), the latter showing off a more sophisticated image.

In 2001, he released the single "Wow" from his sixth album "Infinity." Though considered a disappointment critically and commercially compared to his last three albums, "Infinity" still debuted at No. 1 on the charts with first-week sales of 359,961 units. The album went to achieve sales of over 600,000.

=== 2002–present: Overseas career ===
In 2006, he was featured on rapper H-Eugene's song "독불장군" (English: "Single Person"). The song's music video does not show Yoo's face, but shows him dancing and his silhouette.

In August 2007, Yoo released the single "My World" in China. On September 18, 2007, he released his seventh album Rebirth of YSJ as a "special release" for his fans, with proceeds of the album donated to charity. The album was produced under the collaboration of production teams from the United States, China, and South Korea. He also released the single "You and Me" in China. Yoo appeared on the cover of the October 2007 issue of Men's Health China, where he was the first Korean male to be featured on the cover of the Chinese edition. He earned a role in an untitled Taiwanese drama loosely based on Bret Easton Ellis's novel Less than Zero.

In June 2008, Yoo signed a 15-year contract with Jackie Chan's entertainment management company to become an actor. He has since attempted to establish a name for himself in mainland China while continuing his singing and acting career. In February 2010, Yoo made his film debut in Jackie Chan's Little Big Soldier as Prince Wen.

In 2015, it was announced that Yoo would appear in the film Dragon Blade.

On November 21, 2018, Yoo attempted to make a comeback in the Korean entertainment industry with a 5-track extended play album titled Another Day originally set for release on December 5, with the pre-release title song "Another Day" and accompanying music video set to release on November 22. Yoo's label deleted the teaser and canceled the album after public outrage. Another label who Yoo had contact with also declined to distribute the album. On January 18, 2019, Yoo was able to release Another Day on streaming services such as Melon and Naver Music.

In November 2025, Yoo was featured as an uncredited guest rapper on Justhis's song "Home Home." On January 12, 2026, he announced through his YouTube channel that he would be releasing his own version of the song, "Home Home (YSJ version)", and an accompanying music video.

== Personal life ==
After his banishment from South Korea in 2002, Yoo made his residence in Beijing, China. Soon after, he moved back to the U.S. to live in Los Angeles County, California. Yoo married Christine Oh in 2004, with whom he has 4 children. In October 2019, Yoo launched his YouTube channel, where he posted videos of his daily workout routine.

While Yoo was in South Korea, he attended Kaywon School of Art and Design as a multimedia major. He then majored in business at Cerritos College and theology at Bethesda University.

Yoo was a practitioner of Taekwondo during the height of his celebrity days. He featured his skills on Korean TV shows of the time. In 2010, when he was invited as a guest on the show Asia Uncut, he stated he (at the time of filming) held a 3rd Dan black belt.

=== Banishment from South Korea ===
Yoo had repeatedly stated on television that he would fulfill his mandatory military service. During his physical examination in August 2001, Yoo was given a grade 4 rank, the lowest passing rank to enter the military, due to having a surgery for a herniated disc that resulted from a music video shoot for his fifth album. Although he was scheduled to enlist in the military by the end of 2001, he had his enlistment date postponed by three months in order to perform at a concert in Japan and to visit the United States. While he was in Los Angeles, California, in January 2002, he gave up his citizenship in South Korea in order to obtain citizenship in the United States as a naturalized citizen, thereby becoming exempt from military service. In 2015, Yoo stated that his father had submitted an application for citizenship in the United States without his knowledge, and that he had been persuaded to go through with it because his family was living there and out of concern that citizenship would become more difficult to obtain due to the September 11 attacks. In addition, he was also concerned that being inactive for two years could cause his talent agency to shut down, as he was the highest-earning artist at the agency at the time. Furthermore, he stated that the media had "twisted his words" about agreeing to join the military, and that he was pressured by both his talent agency and the media to follow through with enlisting.

As a result of Yoo relinquishing his Korean citizenship, the South Korean government considered it an act of desertion and permanently banned him from entering the country. He is the only person to be banned from South Korea for obtaining another citizenship. Yoo had attempted to return to South Korea in February 2002 to resume his activities and to hold a press conference regarding his citizenship, but he was banned from entering the Incheon International Airport. In 2003, his father-in-law, who resided in South Korea, died. South Korea's Ministry of Justice allowed Yoo temporary entry into South Korea for three days. In 2011, in response to an announcement by South Korean television network Seoul Broadcasting System on holding a public poll on whether South Koreans thought Yoo should be allowed to come back to South Korea, he said he had no plan to return.

On May 19, 2015, Yoo held a live stream through AfreecaTV apologizing to the Korean public and addressing his reasons for pursuing citizenship in the United States. He promised to complete his military service, but, by that time, he was 39 years old in Korean years (38 years old) and had passed the age limit for being able to serve. He held a second live stream addressing the feedback on May 27, 2015. Both live streams were received poorly by the public, particularly the second live stream, which had ended in a man's voice cursing when the microphone failed to disconnect. AfreecaTV issued an apology to the viewers, stating that the cursing was "intended for the staff."

In response to Koreans renouncing their citizenship to avoid military service, in 2016, the Military Manpower Administration introduced the Steve Yoo Law, which required Koreans with dual citizenship to enlist in the military. In 2020, Mo Jung-hwa, the chief of the Military Manpower Administration, stated that Yoo appearing on South Korean broadcasts as a figure in the entertainment industry would create a "risk of lowering the morale" of South Korean citizens performing military service and affect their "willingness" to fulfill their duties. Kim Byung-joo, a politician from the Democratic Party of Korea, proposed the Yoo Seung-jun Prevention Act, which would ban people who had given up their South Korean citizenship before fulfilling their military service from entering South Korea. Yoo responded and criticized this on his YouTube channel.

==== Korea visa application attempts and lawsuits ====
In September 2015, Yoo applied for a Korean F-4 visa as an overseas Korean through the Consulate General of Los Angeles, which would allow him to work and live in South Korea, but his application was rejected. Yoo then filed a lawsuit disputing the rejection in October of the same year. In September 2016, the case was overruled and Yoo lost the lawsuit. He submitted an appeal in October 2016. In February 23, 2017, following a court hearing, Yoo lost his second and final appeal for having his entry ban lifted, and was no longer allowed to return to South Korea, nor would he be able to appeal his entry ban in the future. On July 11, 2019, the South Korean Supreme Court sent Yoo's previously closed case back to the Seoul High Court. On November 15, 2019, an appeals court reversed its earlier decision and ruled in favor of Yoo.

Following this, Yoo attempted to apply for a visa again, but the Consulate General of Los Angeles again rejected the application on July 2, 2019, causing him to file a second lawsuit with the Seoul Administrative Court in October 2020. On April 28, 2022, the Seoul Administrative Court ruled against Yoo, stating that the previous ruling was due to "procedural flaws." Yoo again appealed the decision, with the first hearing on September 22, 2022. On July 13, 2023, the Seoul High Court overturned the Seoul Administrative Court ruling. On November 30, 2023, the Seoul High Court ruled in favor of Yoo, stating that there was "no just cause" to deny him a visa. However, the court ruling was separate from the South Korean government's ban, and Yoo attaining a visa did not indicate he would be allowed back into the country. In September 2024, Yoo's request for a visa was denied for a third time.

== Discography ==
=== Studio albums ===
| Title | Album details | Peak chart positions | Sales |
| Title | Album details | KOR | Sales |
|---|---|---|---|
| West Side | Released: March 3, 1997; Label: Universal Music; Formats: CD, cassette | —N/a* | KOR: 800,000+ |
| For Sale | Released: April 29, 1998; Label: Best Media; Formats: CD, cassette | 2 | KOR: 796,412+ |
| Now Or Never | Released: April 15, 1999; Label: Baeksan Media; Formats: CD, cassette | 1 | KOR: 825,569+ |
| Over And Over | Released: December 10, 1999; Label: Warner Music Korea; Formats: CD, cassette | 1 | KOR: 530,674+ |
| Summit Revival | Released: November 24, 2000; Label: West Side Media; Formats: CD, cassette | 3 | KOR: 414,615+ |
| Infinity | Released: August 31, 2001; Label: West Side Media; Formats: CD, cassette | 2 | KOR: 243,119+ |
| Rebirth of YSJ | Released: September 18, 2007; Label: Genie Music; Formats: CD, digital download | — | —N/a |
*Chart positions not available prior to 1998 "—" denotes album did not chart.

=== Extended plays ===
| Title | Album details | Peak chart positions | Sales |
| Title | Album details | KOR | Sales |
|---|---|---|---|
| Another Day | Released: January 18, 2019; Label: YSJ Media Group; Formats: CD, digital download | — | — |
"—" denotes album did not chart.

=== Compilations and live albums ===
- 98 Live Album (1998)
- New Release + English Version (1999)
- All That Yoo Seung Jun (1999)
- Gold Techno Remix (2000)
- Hidden Story (2001)
- Best & J Duet Collection (2001)
- Yoo Seung Jun 2002 Live (2002)

== Filmography ==
=== Film ===
- Little Big Soldier (2010)
- He-Man (2011)
- Scheme With Me (2012)
- Chinese Zodiac (2012)
- Man of Tai Chi (2013)
- The Wrath of Vajra (2013)
- Long's Story (2014)
- The Break-Up Artist (2014)
- Dragon Blade (2015)
- Taste of Love (2015)
- Crazy Fist (2017)
- Romantic Warrior (2017)
- Invictus Basketball (2017)
- Blade Master Li Bai (2019)

=== Television ===
- The Sleuth of the Ming Dynasty (2020)
- The Patriot Yue Fei (2013)

== Awards and nominations ==
=== Golden Disc Awards ===
| Year | Category | Work | Result |
|---|---|---|---|
| 1997 | Bonsang (Best Artist) | Yoo Seung-jun | Won |
| 1999 | Bonsang (Best Artist) | Yoo Seung-jun | Won |
| 2000 | Bonsang (Best Artist) | Yoo Seung-jun | Won |

=== Mnet Asian Music Awards ===
| Year | Category | Work | Result |
|---|---|---|---|
| 1999 | Best Male Artist | "Passion" (열정) | Nominated |
| 2000 | Best Dance Performance | "Vision" (비전) | Nominated |
| 2001 | Best Dance Performance | "Wow" | Won |
| 2001 | Best Male Artist | "Wow" | Nominated |

=== Seoul Music Awards ===
| Year | Category | Work | Result |
|---|---|---|---|
| 2000 | Bonsang (Main Prize) | Yoo Seung-jun | Won |
| 2001 | Bonsang (Main Prize) | Yoo Seung-jun | Won |
