= Never Grow Up (disambiguation) =

"Never Grow Up" is a song by Taylor Swift from the 2010 album Speak Now.

Never Grow Up may also refer to:

- Never Grow Up (book), 2015 autobiography by Jackie Chan
- Never Grow Up, 2017 stand-up comedy special by Bryan Callen

== Music ==
=== Albums ===
- Never Grow Up, a 2012 album by Mr Hudson
- Never Grow Up: Lullabies and Happy Songs, a 2014 charity album by Brooke White
- Never Grow Up, a 2019 album by Chanmina
- Never Grow Up, a 2019 extended play (EP) by Shane Eagle

=== Songs ===
- "Never Grow Up", from Svoy's 2011 album Grow Up
- "Never Grow Up", from The Alchemist's 2012 album Russian Roulette
- "Never Grow Up", from Niall Horan's 2023 album The Show
- "I Won't Grow Up", a song from the 1954 musical Peter Pan which features the repeated line "never grow up"
