= Meet the In-Laws (2012 film) =

- poster
- Chinese: 搞定岳父大人
- Literal meaning: Pacify Mr. Father-in-Law
- Hanyu Pinyin: Gǎodìng Yuèfù Dàrén
- Directed by: Li Haishu
- Written by: Li Haishu; Huang Yanwei
- Produced by: Liu Zhijiang
- Starring: Xu Zheng; Benz Hui; Lin Peng
- Cinematography: Liu Yonghong
- Edited by: Zhang Yifan
- Music by: Double-Y
- Production company: HG Entertainment
- Release date: August 3, 2012
- Running time: 91 minutes
- Country: China
- Language: Mandarin
- Box office: $2.6 million

Meet the In-Laws is a 2012 Chinese comedy film directed by Li Haishu.

== Plot ==
Psychologist Fan Jianqiang (Xu Zheng) travels with his girlfriend Su Xi (Lin Peng) from Shanghai to her home in Hangzhou, to meet her parents for the first time. Things get off to a rocky start when Fan discovers that his prospective father-in-law Su Bohu (Benz Hui) is actually one of his patients who had disclosed to him all his secrets.
