= Jackie Chan Hill =

Neighbourhood in Banda Aceh, Indonesia

Coordinates: 5°38′09″N 95°25′03″E

Jackie Chan Hill or Jackie Chan Village (Indonesian: Kampung Jackie Chan; formally: The Friendship Village of Indonesia-China) is a neighbourhood in Banda Aceh, Indonesia. It is named for Chinese actor Jackie Chan who, with other Hong Kong actors, helped fund the building of the community and purchase of the hill. Jackie Chan also campaigned with the Hong Kong Red Cross to raise additional relief funds that went to reconstruction of the site. Officially, the government does not allow villages to be named after individuals, hence the official name not bearing "Jackie Chan". The neighbourhood is built up on a hill, high enough to avoid being inundated by a tsunami, thus being safe from tsunamis. The village is a green field construction, where only treed hills and farmers' fields once stood. It is located 25 minutes, some 17 km, outside of central Banda Aceh. The village is 1.5 km inland and elevated 300m. The village has a clinic and kindergarten and a covered village square for a market. However the market has not worked out. There are 606 mostly single family homes in the village. The village was built by a Chinese contractor. The quality of the build is reasonable, unlike some other similar reconstruction efforts in Aceh. There is no local high school, and the public transport system is insufficient to needs, as most jobs are located far from the village. The village opened in 2007 with 2400 residents from a variety of villages and a variety of ethnic groups. They have lived harmoniously and built a community together. As of 2014, the community's kindergarten is currently unused. Some 1200 people remain, others having moved away to be closer to work or services. Those that still hold title to their homes have rented them out to others.
