= Little Big Soldier =

2010 Hong Kong-Chinese film by Ding Sheng

- International poster
- Directed by: Ding Sheng
- Written by: Jackie Chan
- Produced by: Jackie Chan; Gao Jingxin; Solon So; Sun Rong
- Starring: Jackie Chan; Leehom Wang; Steve Yoo; Lin Peng
- Cinematography: Zhao Xiaoding; Ding Yu
- Edited by: Ding Sheng
- Music by: Xiao Ke
- Distributed by: Polybona Films; JCE Movies Limited
- Release dates: 14 February 2010 (China); 25 February 2010 (Hong Kong)
- Running time: 96 minutes
- Countries: China; Hong Kong
- Language: Mandarin
- Budget: US$25 million
- Box office: US$30 million

Little Big Soldier (Chinese: 大兵小将; pinyin: Dà Bīng Xiǎo Jiang, lit. "Big Soldier, Little General") is a 2010 action comedy film directed by Ding Sheng and produced and written by Jackie Chan, also starring Chan and Leehom Wang. A Hong Kong-Chinese co-production, the film was produced with a budget of US$25 million and filmed between January and April 2009 at locations in Yunnan, China. According to Chan, the film was stuck in development hell for over 20 years.

Little Big Soldier takes place during the Warring States period of China. An old foot soldier (Chan) and a young general from a rival state (Wang) are the only survivors of a ruthless battle. The soldier decides to capture the general and bring him back to his own state in exchange for a reward. The film received generally positive reviews from critics.

== Plot ==
The film is set in the 3rd century BC during the Warring States period of China. After a battle between the states of Liang and Wey, only two men are left alive – a Liang foot soldier and a Wey general. The Soldier survived because he is an expert in playing dead, with a device protruding like an arrowhead strapped to his body for added realism.

The Soldier captures the wounded General, hoping to use him as a ticket to freedom – by handing an enemy general to the king of Liang, the Soldier can be honourably discharged from military service and return home to a peaceful life. The young General, though taken captive, is condescending towards the Soldier. The two men are often at loggerheads during the long and winding journey, but are forced to work together in order to survive in a variety of circumstances: being tricked by a singer who blames them for the war; being nearly killed by a bear in the woods; being attacked by a group of beggars; and being captured and enslaved by a group of Loufan warriors.

To make matters more complicated, the General is actually the crown prince of Wey. Prince Wen, the General's younger brother, is coveting the throne of Wey. When he learns that the General has survived the battle, he leads his men on a relentless attempt to hunt down and kill the General in order to secure his claim to the throne. Although they stand on opposing sides, the Soldier ends up siding with the General against Prince Wen.

The General and Prince Wen decide to cooperate when they are attacked by the Loufan warriors, whose leader is seeking revenge on Prince Wen for killing his wife earlier. At the end of the fight, Prince Wen commits suicide to appease the Loufan leader and tells the General that one of them needs to live in order to ensure the continuity of Wey.

In the end, the Soldier brings the General back to Liang, but changes his mind at the last minute and releases the General – after the General promises that Wey will not wage war on Liang for the next ten years if he becomes the king of Wey. Turning towards Liang, the Soldier is shocked to see that his home state has been conquered by the state of Qin. Depressed that his quest was in vain to begin with and there is nothing left for him to return to, the Soldier raises the Liang flag in defiance to the Qins so the Qin soldiers fire arrows at him. Still proudly holding up the Liang flag, the Soldier collapses and dies. The state of Wey ultimately surrenders to the state of Qin without a fight.

== Cast ==
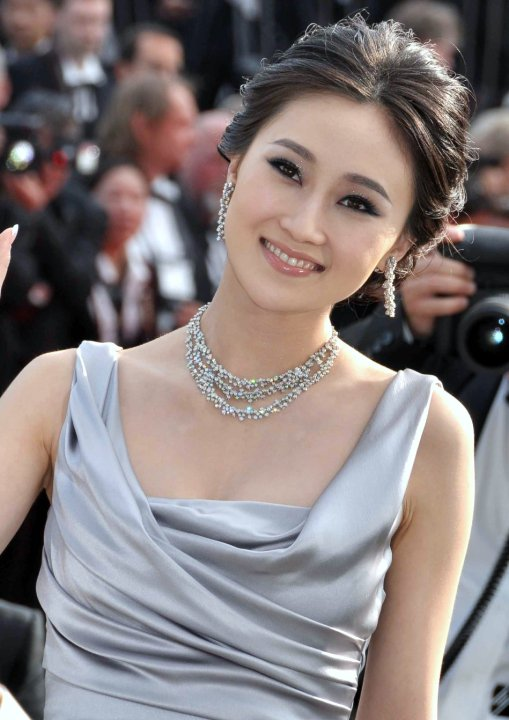
Newcomer Lin Peng was chosen as the film's lead actress.

- Jackie Chan as the Soldier
- Leehom Wang as the General
- Steve Yoo as Prince Wen, the General's younger brother
- Du Yuming as Guard Wu, Prince Wen's bodyguard
- Lin Peng as the Singer
- Xu Dongmei as Loufan Yan, the Loufan leader's wife
- Jin Song as Loufan Wei, the Loufan leader
- Ken Lo as Guard Yong, Prince Wen's bodyguard
- Yu Rongguang as Deputy General Yu, a Wey deputy general executed by the General
- Wang Baoming as a Liang scout
- Wu Yue as a beggar
- Yuen Woo-ping as a Liang official

== Production ==
Little Big Soldier was a joint production of China's Polybona Films and Hong Kong's JCE Movies Limited, a company set up by Jackie Chan in 2003. The film is notable for having been in production for over 20 years. Chan had wanted to perform in and write a comedic film that took place in a historical background since the 1980s, when Hong Kong action cinema was rising in prominence.

=== Casting ===
Chan originally had Daniel Wu in mind to play the part of the young general, but Chan disregarded that thought after realising that he had already filmed two movies earlier with Wu. Joan Lin, Chan's wife, suggested their son Jaycee Chan, but Chan was highly against it. Lin later suggested Leehom Wang, whom Chan agreed to immediately. Chan and Wang have remained close friends ever since, and went on to collaborate on numerous songs, movies, concerts, and official events.

== Reception ==
On review aggregator website Rotten Tomatoes, the film has an approval rating of 79% based on 14 reviews.

== Home media ==
In the United Kingdom, Little Big Soldier was one of 2011's top ten best-selling foreign-language films on physical home video formats, and the fourth-best-selling Chinese film (below Ip Man 2, Ip Man and Confucius).

== Video game ==
At a conference in Beijing on 20 November 2009, Jackie Chan announced, along with Universal Culture Limited and EURO WEBSOFT, that an MMO was being released to promote the film. Chan and Wang's characters in the game were also shown at the conference. On 26 January 2010, the MMO went online under the name FLASH Little Big Soldier (Chinese: FLASH大兵小將). It was free to play under an account subscription. However, the game was available only in Chinese. The game could no long be played after Adobe discontinued Flash in 2020.

== Spinoff ==
The Adventures of Jinbao (大兵金宝历险记) is a Chinese computer-animated film directed by Wu Yaoquan and Lu Guocheng, released on 10 August 2012 in mainland China. It is a 3D fantasy adventure film developed as an extension of the Little Big Soldier (大兵小将) franchise, with Jackie Chan having authorized the use of his character for the project.

== See also ==
- Jackie Chan filmography
