= Dragon Blade (film) =

2015 Chinese-Hong Kong film by Daniel Lee

- Film poster

Chinese name
- Traditional Chinese: 天將雄師
- Simplified Chinese: 天将雄师
- Literal meaning: "Celestial General, Heroic Army"
Transcriptions
Standard Mandarin
- Hanyu Pinyin: Tiān Jiàng Xióng Shī
Yue: Cantonese
- Jyutping: Tin¹ Zeong³ Hung⁴ Si¹
- Directed by: Daniel Lee
- Written by: Daniel Lee
- Produced by: Jackie Chan; Susanna Tsang
- Starring: Jackie Chan; John Cusack; Lin Peng; Mika Wang; Choi Siwon; Adrien Brody
- Cinematography: Tony Cheung
- Edited by: Yau Chi-wai
- Music by: Henry Lai Wan-man
- Production companies: Beijing Cultural Assets Chinese Film & Television Fund; Home Media and Entertainment; Huayi Brothers Shanghai Film Group; Shenzhen Tencent Video Culture Communication; Sparkle Roll Cultural Media; Visualizer Films; Lionsgate Films
- Distributed by: SFC Film (China); Intercontinental Film Distributors (HK) Ltd. (Hong Kong)
- Release dates: 18 February 2015 (Taiwan); 19 February 2015 (China); 12 March 2015 (Hong Kong); 4 September 2015 (United States)
- Running time: 127 minutes 103 minutes (U.S)
- Countries: China; Hong Kong
- Languages: Mandarin; Cantonese; English
- Budget: US$65 million
- Box office: US$122 million

Dragon Blade is a 2015 historical action film written and directed by Daniel Lee starring Jackie Chan. In the film, Chan plays Huo An, the commander of the Protection Squad of the Western Regions during the Han dynasty. A Chinese-Hong Kong co-production, Dragon Blade was released in IMAX 3D on 19 February 2015, the first day of the Chinese New Year holiday period. The film was released in the United States on 4 September 2015 by Lionsgate Premiere. It was met with generally mixed-to-negative reviews by critics, who praised its action scenes, cinematography and performances, but criticized its screenplay, story, editing and special effects.

== Plot ==
In northwest China, a security, customs and peacekeeping company under Han China's current government called Silk Road Protection Squad is committed to stopping battles, customs clearing and peacekeeping on the Silk Road. Huo An (Jackie Chan), the captain, successfully averts a battle between Indians and Xiongnu whilst he inadvertently disgraces the Xiongnu woman warrior. The squad returns to their home city where Huo An's gentle wife Xiuqing (Mika Wang) serves as a schoolteacher for orphans of multiple ethnicities. One day, the Protection Squad's commanders uncover evidence that someone in the Squad is corrupt after soldiers found bribes among the corpses of enemies they neutralised. Suspecting Huo An and his squad to be the culprits, the commanders sentence them to construction work at the Wild Geese Gate, a ruined fortress located on the fringes of the Western regions, run by a Turkic auxiliary commander which houses workers, peasants, and prisoners of various nomadic groups tasked with rebuilding the fort.

Not long after, Wild Geese Gate is threatened by an exhausted Roman legion, carrying with them a blind boy named Publius (Jozef Waite), the youngest son of triumvir Marcus Licinius Crassus. The Wild Geese Gate commander tries to fight the Romans, only to be defeated. Huo An rides out to stop the Romans, leading to a duel between him and legion commander Lucius (Cusack). The duel ends in a stalemate after discovering a coming sandstorm, and seeing Publius and some Roman soldiers collapse due to starvation. Huo An allows the Romans to enter the fortress and recover, despite the Wild Geese Gate commander's protests. The next day, the Romans help the workers in rebuilding the fortress using their superior engineering skills, boosting the morale and happiness of the inhabitants in the process. Huo An returns the favour by sending some of his men to assist Lucius' envoys in reaching the Parthian Empire. A celebration is later held and Huo An is made an honorary centurion by Publius himself.

Lucius reveals that he and Publius are fleeing from Publius' brother Tiberius (Brody), a sadistic and ruthless Roman who betrayed and murdered Crassus during the Battle of Carrhae, blinded Publius to become consul, and defied the peace treaty with the Parthians. Learning from the soldiers Huo An sent earlier that Tiberius is marching with 100,000 soldiers, Huo An insists on helping Lucius stop Tiberius as he is a big threat to the Silk Road. Shortly after, Huo An leaves to gather reinforcements, only to find that his second-in-command, revealed to be the corrupt soldier, has sent soldiers to murder Xiuqing and attack Wild Geese Gate in an attempt to help Tiberius in his conquest of the Silk Road and become the Protection Squad's commanding prefect. Huo An saves his wife and the orphans with help from the Xiongnu, but his wife is mortally wounded when she tried to rescue one of the orphans. With her dying breath, Xiuqing convinces Huo An to protect the orphans. Meanwhile, Lucius is betrayed and imprisoned alongside his legionaries in the city of Kroran, where Tiberius and his legions are encamped. Lucius is brutally tortured by Tiberius while Publius and his tutor are forced to commit suicide.

After learning of Lucius and his legion's capture, Huo An and a few loyal soldiers from his squad and the Wild Geese Gate travel to Kroran to rescue them and liberate the Silk Road. Huo An's group incites an uprising that frees Lucius' soldiers while Huo An himself breaks into Lucius' cell to free him, to no avail. As Tiberius' soldiers arrive to apprehend Huo An, he is begged by Lucius to kill him so that he does not have to suffer a slow death. Huo An tearfully acquiesces before returning to help his comrades. As Huo An and Lucius' soldiers are routed, nomadic hordes arrive to help them in the fight against Tiberius and his legions. A battle ensues but, despite their combined strength, the nomadic forces are unable to gain the upper hand and they suffer heavy casualties. Among the dead are members of Huo An's squad, the Wild Geese Gate commander and his translator, and the Xiongnu warriors. The battle's tide is soon turned when an army of Parthians, led by some of Lucius' soldiers sent earlier, arrive to avenge Crassus and restore peace between Rome and Parthia. Tiberius is persuaded by his generals to surrender but he stubbornly refuses. Huo An then challenges Tiberius to a fierce duel, which ends with Tiberius being killed.

After the battle, the Chinese emperor allows the Romans to establish their own city, naming it Regum, or Liqian in Chinese, upon hearing of their bravery. The Emperor also allows the surviving nomadic inhabitants of the Wild Geese Gate to join the Protection Squad with Huo An as their commander. Huo An and his men then honour their fallen comrades, especially Lucius, by relocating Wild Geese Gate's shrine to Regum. Thousands of years later, the city fades from collective memory until in the present day, a team of archaeologists stumble upon the site and uncover its ruins but upon learning of its tragic history via 3D reconstruction, the archeologists prefer to leave Regum be in peace.

== Cast ==
- Jackie Chan as Huo An (霍安), the captain of The Silk Road Protection Squad, a fictional elite fighting force created by the Han dynasty to preserve peace in the region
- John Cusack as Lucius, a rogue Roman general who allies with Huo An against Tiberius
- Adrien Brody as Tiberius, a ruthless, psychotic and bloodthirsty Roman general of the Roman Republic and the main antagonist
- Lin Peng as Cold Moon
- Mika Wang as Xiu Qing (Huo An's Wife)
- Choi Siwon as Yin Po
- Xiao Yang as Captain
- Wang Taili as Rat
- Sammy Hung as Red Sun
- Yoo Seung-jun as Cougar
- Lorie Pester as a Parthian Queen
- Vanness Wu as Christian
- Karena Lam as Karena
- Feng Shaofeng as General Huo Qubing (Han Chinese General)
- Sharni Vinson as Lady Crassus
- Jozef Waite as Publius
- Philippe Joly as Decimus
- James Lee Guy (uncredited) as Eugene

== Production ==
=== Filming ===
Principal photography for Dragon Blade started on 15 April 2014 in Hengdian, China with some battle scenes. The cast and crew encountered difficult filming conditions due to the heat, their heavy costume and long filming hours. Two days later, a press conference for Dragon Blade was held at the Beijing International Film Festival where star Jackie Chan and director Daniel Lee attended and announced the film to be released in IMAX 3D on 19 February 2015, the first day of the Chinese Lunar New Year. Aside from Hengdian, production took place in Dunhuang and the Gobi Desert.

The film was shot with a budget of US$65 million. The film was financed by Sparkle Roll Media Corporation, Huayi Brothers Media Corporation, Shanghai Film Group, Home Media & Entertainment Fund, Tencent Video and the Beijing Cultural Assets Chinese Film and Television Fund. A signing ceremony for the launching of Beijing Cultural Assets Chinese Film and Television Fund also occurred there as Dragon Blade is the first film to receive an investment from the fund. International distribution of the film outside of China was handled by Golden Network Asia.

Chan stated that he made the film to express a message of peace for the world.

== Release ==
=== Box office ===
Dragon Blade was a commercial success in its native country, China. It opened Thursday, February 19 in China and grossed US$18.7 million on the opening day. Through Sunday, February 22, it had a 3-day opening weekend total of US$33 million, topping the Chinese box office (US$54.8 million from Thursday - Sunday) from 132,874 screenings and 8.14 million admissions. Through its opening week it earned US$72 million. The film fell to number three the following weekend, earning US$45.9 million (down 19%). As of March 15, 2015, Dragon Blade has earned US$120 million in China alone.

=== Critical response ===
Dragon Blade has received a mixed reception, but with praise for its large-scale battle sequences, production design, and mixing of styles from both Hollywood and East Asian cinema. On Rotten Tomatoes, the film has an approval rating of 36% based on reviews from 47 critics, with an average rating of 4.62/10. The site's consensus reads, "Dragon Blade is beautifully staged and choreographed, but between the battles, its talented cast is overwhelmed by a dull story and choppy editing." On Metacritic, the film has a weighted average score of 41 out of 100 based on reviews from 12 critics, indicating "mixed or average reviews".

Variety's Maggie Lee applauded the film for its overall technical details and concluded it to be "a colossal entertainment with solid technique and terrific storytelling smarts". Clarence Tsui of The Hollywood Reporter complimented Dragon Blade for its filmmaking quality and screenplay for a primarily mainland Chinese production. IGN awarded it a score of 6 out of 10, saying "The story is rubbish, but Dragon Blade has some cool fight scenes thanks to Jackie Chan's action direction."

Indian news outlets gave predominantly negative reviews on the film. Claiming it to be "a Chinese propagandist film", The Hindu's Venky Vembu criticized the film's lack of subtle messages and disapproved of the characterizations, writing: "I watched this film in 3D, but given the two-dimensional nature of the cardboard characters, I don't think the third D would have vastly enhanced my viewing experience." IANS also labeled the film as "Chinese torture", but did commend the film for its action choreography and Jackie Chan's performance as the Chinese General Huo An: "With ample footage in action and emotional scenes, [Huo An] is one of the best characters Chan has portrayed in recent years."

== Historical basis ==
Marcus Licinius Crassus invaded Parthia in 53 BC, but most of his entire army was destroyed. The historian Homer H. Dubs speculated in 1941 that Roman prisoners of war who were transferred to the eastern border of the Parthian empire might later have clashed with Han troops there. Similar claims, and even a Roman force defecting to China, have been made since. These include a supposed Roman town near modern Liqian. But most historians do not accept this.

The first undisputed contact was much later, in 161 AD. An embassy from Roman Emperor Antoninus Pius or his successor Marcus Aurelius reached the Chinese Emperor Huan of Han at Luoyang.

The real life Publius, in 53 BC, wasn't a blind kid as shown in the movie, but a seasoned Roman army officer at least 30 years old. Publius was wounded and committed suicide to avoid capture during the Battle of Carrhae.

Publius had no confirmed brothers named Tiberius, his only brother was the older Marcus Licinius Crassus (the Younger). Crassus the Younger was serving as a proquaestor in Gaul during Caesar's Gallic Wars in 53 BC.

== See also ==
- Daqin (ancient Chinese name for the Roman Empire)
- Jackie Chan filmography
- Sino-Roman relations
- The Malay Chronicles: Bloodlines
- The Great Wall, a film about a group of mercenary soldiers from Europe who wind up in China during the Northern Song dynasty
