= Never Grow Up (book) =

2015 autobiography by Jackie Chan with Zhu Mo

- First edition
- Author: Jackie Chan, Zhu Mo
- Original title: 成龙:还没长大就老了
- Translator: Jeremy Tiang
- Language: Cantonese
- Genre: Autobiography
- Publisher: Jiangsu literature and Art Publishing House (Chinese); Simon and Schuster (English)
- Publication date: April 2015 (Chinese); December 2018 (English)
- Publication place: Hong Kong
- Media type: Papercover/Hardcover
- Pages: 350 (Chinese); 352 (English)
- ISBN: 978-7539981697

Never Grow Up (Chinese: 成龙:还没长大就老了; lit. 'Jackie Chan: Getting Old Before Growing Up') is a 2015 autobiography by Jackie Chan with Zhu Mo. The book tells of Chan's life story from childhood years at the China Drama Academy, his big breaks in Hong Kong and Hollywood and honorary Academy Award for his lifetime achievement in film, and his life as a husband and father. In December 2018, the book was released in English, translated by Jeremy Tiang, with the title Never Grow Up.
