= Wuhan Institute of Design and Sciences =

Private college in Wuhan, Hubei, China

Coordinates: 30°25′13.5″N 114°25′47.6″E

- 武汉设计工程学院
- Former names: Chutian College of Huazhong Agricultural University
- Established: 2006
- Website: www.wids.edu.cn

The Wuhan Institute of Design and Sciences (武汉设计工程学院; lit. 'Wuhan Design and Engineering College') is a private undergraduate college in Wuhan, Hubei, China. Despite the English name, the college has not yet be granted university status by the Ministry of Education of China. This private undergraduate institution comprises the College of Food and Biotechnology, the Jackie Chan Film and Television Media College, the School of Fashion Design, the School of Information Engineering, the School of Cultural and Creative Management (formerly known as the School of Business), the Yaxin Nursing College, and the School of Environmental Design.
