= List of Hong Kong films of 1997 =

This article lists feature-length Hong Kong films released in 1997.

== Box office ==
The highest-grossing Hong Kong films released in 1997, by domestic box office gross revenue, are as follows:

Highest-grossing films released in 1997
Rank	Title	Domestic gross
1	Mr. Nice Guy	HK$45,420,457
2	All's Well, Ends Well 1997	HK$40,443,625
3	Once Upon a Time in China and America	HK$30,268,415
4	Lawyer Lawyer	HK$27,163,795
5	Armageddon	HK$23,733,200
6	Lifeline	HK$20,757,187
7	Island of Greed	HK$18,273,895
8	Killing Me Tenderly	HK$15,881,265
9	Young and Dangerous 4	HK$15,797,825
10	Full Alert	HK$14,691,880

== Releases ==
Title	Director	Cast	Genre	Notes
1997
02:00 A.M.	Andy Chin	Jordon Chan, Michael Chow, Wyman Wong		
03:00 A.M.	Andy Chin	Jordon Chan, Theresa Lee, Cheung Tat-ming		
24 Hours Ghost Story	Wellson Chin	Francis Ng, Dayo Wong, Gigi Lai		
97 Aces Go Places	Chin Kar-lok	Alan Tam, Tony Leung Chiu-Wai, Christy Chung	Comedy	
97' Lan Kwai Fong	Joe Hau	Tong Man-lun, Chiu Ho-yee, Tun Oi-ling		
Black Rose II	Jeffrey Lau, Corey Yuen			
Ah Fai The Dumb	Derek Chiu	Eric Kot, Athena Chu, Hui Chi-on		
All's Well, Ends Well 1997	Alfred Cheung	Stephen Chow, Raymond Wong Pak-ming	Comedy	
Armageddon	Gordon Chan	Andy Lau, Michelle Reis, Anthony Wong	Science fiction	
Chinese Midnight Express	Billy Tang Hin-Shing	Tony Leung Chiu-Wai		
Eighteen Springs	Ann Hui	Jacklyn Wu, Leon Lai, Anita Mui, Ge You	Drama	
Full Alert	Ringo Lam	Lau Ching-wan, Francis Ng, Hao Kou-hsin		
Happy Together	Wong Kar-wai	Leslie Cheung, Tony Leung Chiu-Wai, Chang Chen	Drama, romance	
Island of Greed	Michael Mak	Andy Lau, Tony Leung Ka-fai, Alien Sun, Annie Wu	Crime	
Kitchen	Yim Ho	Jordan Chan		Entered into the 47th Berlin International Film Festival
Lawyer Lawyer	Joe Ma Wai-Ho	Stephen Chow, Eric Kot		
Legend of the Wolf	Donnie Yen	Donnie Yen, Carman Lee, Wong Chi Wah	Action	
Made in Hong Kong	Fruit Chan	Sam Lee, Neiky Yim, Wenders Li	Drama	
Mr. Nice Guy	Sammo Hung	Jackie Chan, Richard Norton, Gabrielle Fitzpatrick	Action	Copyright notice: 1996.
Once Upon a Time in China and America	Sammo Hung	Jet Li, Rosamund Kwan, Xiong Xin Xin	Action	
The Soong Sisters	Mabel Cheung	Elaine Jin, Maggie Cheung, Jiang Wen	Historical	
Troublesome Night	Steve Cheng, Victor Tam, Herman Yau	Simon Lui, Louis Koo, Ada Choi, Teresa Mak, Law Lan, Lee Lik-Chi, Christy Chung, Sunny Chan		
Troublesome Night 2	Herman Yau	Simon Lui, Louis Koo, Amanda Lee Wai Man, Chin Kar-lok, Wayne Lai, Cheung Tat Ming, Vincent Kok		
We're No Bad Guys	Wong Jing	Ekin Cheng, Jordan Chan, Gigi Leung, Vivian Hsu	Action	
Whatever Will Be, Will Be	Barry Chu	Michael Tse, Teresa Mak	Adult	
Young and Dangerous 4	Andrew Lau	Ekin Cheng, Jordan Chan		
