= 17th Hong Kong Film Awards =

1998 Hong Kong Film Awards

- Date: 26 April 1998
- Site: Hong Kong Cultural Centre
- Hosted by: Carol Cheng and Cheung Tat Ming

The 17th Hong Kong Film Awards ceremony, honored the best films of 1997 and took place on 26 April 1998 at Hong Kong Academy for Performing Arts, Wan Chai, Hong Kong. The ceremony was hosted by Carol Cheng and Cheung Tat Ming, during the ceremony awards are presented in 17 categories.

== Awards ==
Winners are listed first, highlighted in boldface, and indicated with a double dagger (‡).

**Best Film**: **Made in Hong Kong**‡; The Soong Sisters; Lifeline; Full Alert; Happy Together	**Best Director**: **Fruit Chan — Made in Hong Kong**‡; Johnnie To — Lifeline; Mabel Cheung — The Soong Sisters; Ringo Lam — Full Alert; Wong Kar-wai — Happy Together
**Best Screenplay**: **Raymond To — The Mad Phoenix**‡; Alex Law — The Soong Sisters; Johnny Mak — Island of Greed; Wai Ka-Fai, Matt Chow and Szeto Kam-Yuen — Too Many Ways to Be No. 1; Fruit Chan — Made in Hong Kong	**Best Actor**: **Tony Leung — Happy Together**‡; Leslie Cheung — Happy Together; Sean Lau — Full Alert; Tony Leung — Island of Greed; Tse Kwan Ho — The Mad Phoenix
**Best Actress**: **Maggie Cheung — The Soong Sisters**‡; Pauline Suen — Island of Greed; Shu Qi — Love Is Not a Game, But a Joke; Jacklyn Wu — Eighteen Springs; Carina Lau — The Intimates	**Best Supporting Actor**: **Jiang Wen — The Soong Sisters**‡; Chang Chen — Happy Together; Eric Tsang — Task Force; Poon Chan-Leung — The Mad Phoenix; Law Kar-ying — Kitchen
**Best Supporting Actress**: **Anita Mui — Eighteen Springs**‡; Elaine Kam — The Soong Sisters; Theresa Lee — The Intimates; Theresa Lee — Downtown Torpedoes; Michelle Yeoh — The Soong Sisters	**Best New Performer**: **Sam Lee — Made in Hong Kong**‡; Ruby Wong — Lifeline; Nicola Cheung — Cause We Are So Young; Ken Wong — Downtown Torpedoes; Lam Bo-Lun — My Dad Is a Jerk
**Best Cinematography**: **Arthur Wong — The Soong Sisters**‡; Horace Wong — Too Many Ways to Be No. 1; Cheung Man-Biu — Downtown Torpedoes; Mark Lee — Eighteen Springs; Christopher Doyle — Happy Together	**Best Film Editing**: **Wong Wing-Ming — Lifeline**‡; Marco Mak and Angie Lam — Full Alert; Fruit Chan — Made in Hong Kong; Eric Kwong and Cheung Ka-Fai — Downtown Torpedoes; William Chang and Wong Ming-Lam — Happy Together
**Best Art Direction**: **Eddie Ma — The Soong Sisters**‡; Raymond Lee — Island of Greed; Eddie Ma and Ken Mak — Downtown Torpedoes; Bruce Yu and Yank Wong — Eighteen Springs; William Chang — Happy Together	**Best Costume Make Up Design**: **Emi Wada — The Soong Sisters**‡; Silver Cheung — The Odd One Dies; Dora Ng — Downtown Torpedoes; William Chang — Happy Together; Eddie Mok — Eighteen Springs
**Best Action Choreography**: **Tung Wai — Downtown Torpedoes**‡; Yuen Bun — Island of Greed; Yuen Bun — Lifeline; Sammo Hung — Once Upon a Time in China and America; Jackie Chan Stunt Team and Cho Wing — Mr. Nice Guy	**Best Original Film Score**: **Kitarō and Randy Miller — The Soong Sisters**‡; Cacine Wong — Too Many Ways to Be No. 1; Carl Wong — First Love: The Litter on the Breeze; Ye Xiaogang — Eighteen Springs; Peter Kam — Downtown Torpedoes
**Best Original Film Song**: **歡樂今宵 —Cause We Are So Young**‡; Composer: Dennie Wong; Lyricist: Wyman Wong; Singer: Leo Ku; 半生緣 — Eighteen Springs; Composer: Wong Kwok-Lun; Lyricist: Albert Leung; Singer: Leon Lai; 孤星淚 — Island of Greed; Composer: Wu Bai; Lyricist: Wu Bai; Singer: Andy Lau; 一於奉陪 — Young and Dangerous 4; Composer: Duck Lau; Lyricist: Richard Lam; Singer: Ekin Cheng and Jordan Chan; 我愛廚房 — Kitchen; Composer: Otomo Yoshihide; Lyricist: Cheng Kwok-Kong; Singer: Cass Phang	**Best Sound Design**: **Lifeline**‡; Downtown Torpedoes; Full Alert; Island of Greed; The Soong Sisters
**Professional Achievement**: **Chor Yuen**‡
