= Tai Po Plover Cove Garden murder case =

1993 killing in Tai Po, Hong Kong

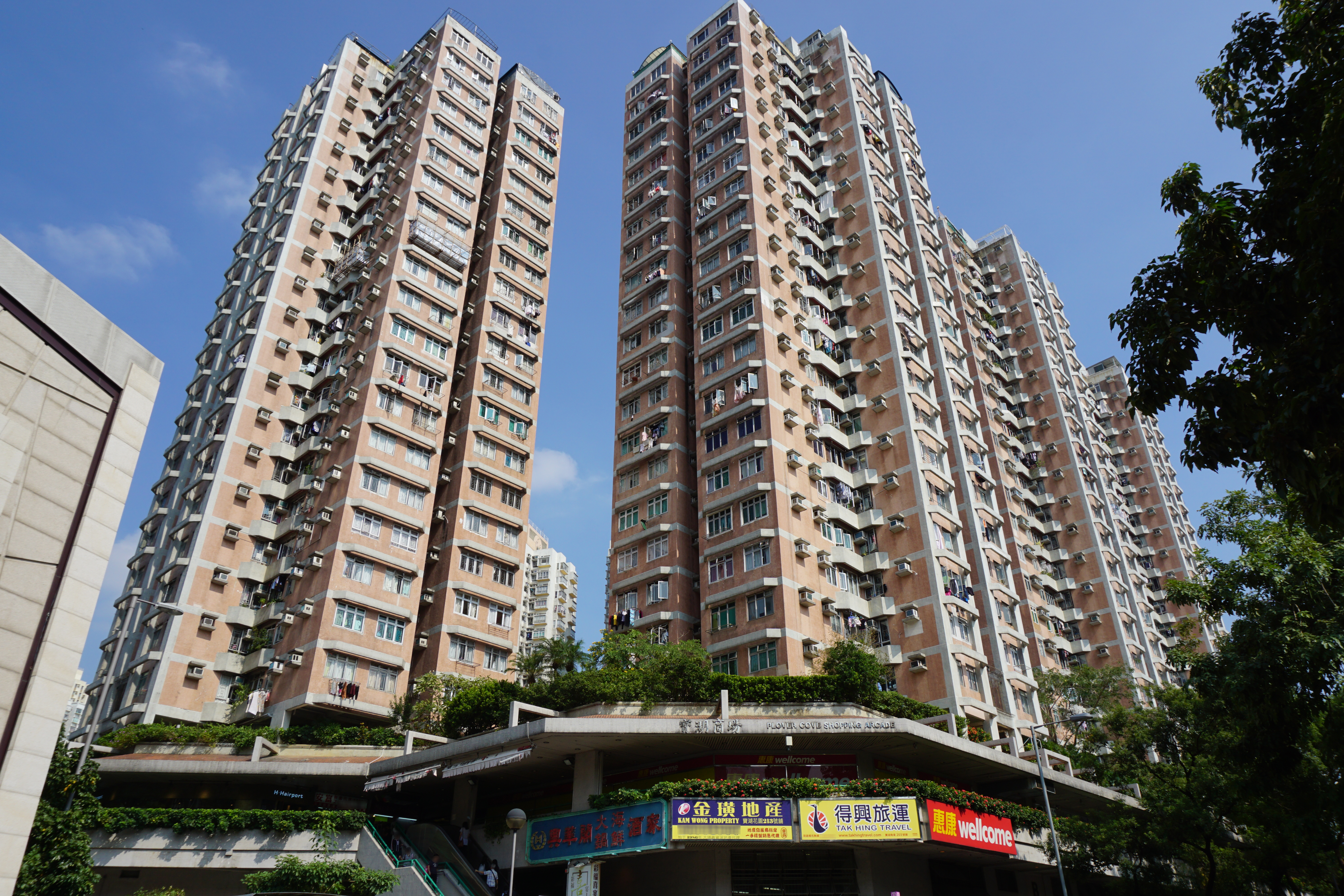
- Plover Cove Garden, Tai Po, where Chung Chor-kuen was killed. (pictured in 2016)
- Location: 16th Floor, Block B, Plover Cove Garden, Tai Po, British Hong Kong
- Date: 5 July 1993
- Target: Chung Chor-kuen
- Attack type: Strangulation, dismemberment
- Deaths: 1
- Perpetrator: Chin Yin-ho
- Motive: Dispute over a roast meat stall licence, financial matters, and a long-running affair involving the victim's husband Law Fuk-shing; possible jealousy

Tai Po Plover Cove Garden murder case
- Chinese: 大埔寶湖花園炸屍案
- Literal meaning: Po Wu Garden burning corpse case
Transcriptions
Standard Mandarin
- Hanyu Pinyin: Dàpǔ Bǎohú Huāyuán zhà shī àn
Yue: Cantonese
- Yale Romanization: Daaihpóu Bouhwù Faayùhn ja syī ngon
- Jyutping: Daai6 bou3 Bou2 wu4 Faa1 jyun4 zaa3 si1 ngon3

On 5 July 1993, at Plover Cove Garden (Note: Chinese-language newspapers refer to the estate as Po Wu Garden.) in Tai Po, British Hong Kong, 32-year-old Chung Chor-kuen (Note: traditional Chinese: 鍾彩娟; simplified Chinese: 钟彩娟; Jyutping: zung1 coi2 gyun1; pinyin: Zhōng Cǎijuān) was taken by Chin Yin-ho, (Note: traditional Chinese: 錢燕荷; simplified Chinese: 钱燕荷; Jyutping: cin4 jin6 ho4; pinyin: Qián Yànhé) the mistress of Chung's husband Law Fuk-shing, (Note: traditional Chinese: 羅福成; simplified Chinese: 罗福成; Jyutping: lo4 fuk1 sing4; pinyin: Luó Fúchéng) to Chin's flat following a dispute over a roast meat stall licence and financial matters arising from their long-running relationship. Chung was killed during the confrontation.

After Chung died during the confrontation, Chin attempted to conceal the crime by burning the body in a bathtub, dismembering the remains with a kitchen chopper, and disposing of them at Kam Shan Country Park. Her 10-year-old granddaughter assisted her in disposing of the remains, although prosecutors did not allege that the child had participated in the killing. The case received much public attention in Hong Kong because of the brutality of the disposal of Chung's body and rumours that circulated following the discovery of the remains. Police publicly dismissed claims that human flesh had been sold through roast meat shops, describing them as unsubstantiated rumours.

Chin was charged with murder of Chung after her arrest in July 1993. Her first trial ended with a hung jury, requiring a retrial. At the retrial, the defence argued that Chung's death occurred unintentionally during a struggle and that Chin had not intended to kill her. In June 1994, the jury acquitted Chin of murder but convicted her of the lesser offence of manslaughter, finding that the prosecution had not proved an intent to kill. She was sentenced to six years' imprisonment. The sentence prompted criticism from Chung's family, who unsuccessfully sought a review on the grounds that it was unduly lenient.

== Background ==
=== Affair and dispute ===
Chung Chor-kuen (aged 32), a resident of Tai Po, and her husband, Law Fuk-shing (aged 33), to whom she had been married for 12 years, operated the Bo-zai Kei (Chinese: 寶仔記) roast meat shop in Tai Po Market, a family business founded by Law's father that had operated for several decades. Law had an extramarital relationship with Chin, a barbecue meat vendor. During their four-year affair, Law set Chin up with her own roast meat business. Although their affair was discovered in 1992, Law continued his relationship with Chin. He said that he had last had sexual relations with Chin at his outlet in Tai Po Market 10 days before she killed his wife.

By 1993, tensions between Chin and Chung had intensified over the operation of the roast meat business after Chin's licence for her stall was cancelled. The dispute involved the renewal of the licence and debts that Chin said were owed to her. According to Chin's later statements, she invited Chung to her flat at Plover Cove Garden during the early hours of 5 July 1993 in an attempt to resolve the disagreements, but after hours of discussion the two failed to reach an agreement.

=== Chin Yin-ho ===
At the time of the incident, Chin Yin-ho was a 47-year-old barbecue meat vendor living at Plover Cove Garden in Tai Po with her 10-year-old granddaughter. Chin had once considered Chung to be "a sister", but their relationship later deteriorated after Chin's affair with Chung's husband Law, became a source of conflict. She had been involved in a relationship with Law for approximately four years and managed a roast meat stall that Law had arranged for her. The business relationship later became a source of conflict after the stall's licence was cancelled and disagreements arose over money and ownership.

According to Chin, she became enraged during the argument over financial matters and the cancellation of the licence, maintaining that Chung died during a struggle and that she had not intended to kill her. During the trial, the prosecution argued that Chin had deliberately abducted and killed Chung, while the defence maintained that Chung's death was accidental and occurred during a struggle.

== Killing ==
Chung Chor-kuen, the victim

On 5 July 1993, Chin took Chung to her flat in Plover Cove Garden, Tai Po, at around 5 a.m. Chung lived in nearby Pan Chung Village. According to Chin's statement to police, she had pleaded with Chung to renew the licence on her roast meat stall, and the two argued for hours over debts but failed to reach an agreement. Chin said she restrained Chung with a baby carrier and strangled her with it. Chin claimed that she had accidentally killed Chung and said that she had not intended to do so.

After Chung's death, Chin left the flat and returned to the roast meat stall, where she cooked vegetarian food for about an hour before returning home. She later returned to the apartment, where she apologised to the deceased before deciding to destroy the body to avoid detection. After purchasing alcohol, joss paper and other funeral offerings, Chin performed traditional religious rites over the body before dragging it into the bathroom. She placed the body in a bathtub, covered it with paper offerings, poured alcohol over it and set it alight. Chin later dismembered the charred body with a kitchen chopper. She placed the remains into three plastic bags while her granddaughter, was in the flat. The following morning, her granddaughter noticed a "stinking smell, thick black smoke and a bubbling sound" coming from the bathroom, but Chin refused to let her enter. Although Chin later claimed that her granddaughter was unaware of the contents of the bags, the granddaughter told police that she had seen Chung tied to a chair, and later discovered charred human remains inside one of the bags.

On the evening of 6 July, after Law informed Chin that he had reported his wife's disappearance to police, Chin became fearful that the crime would be discovered. She and her granddaughter travelled by taxi to the vicinity of Kam Shan Country Park, where the bags containing Chung's remains were discarded at different locations on a hillside.

== Investigation ==
Locations associated with the Tai Po Plover Cove Garden murder case
1 Plover Cove Garden, Tai Po (location of the killing)
2 Kam Shan Country Park (body disposal site and location where remains were recovered)

On 8 July 1993, police began investigating after human remains were discovered on a hillside in Kam Shan Country Park. The remains, which had been placed in plastic bags, included a torso and a head, while other body parts were recovered during an extensive search of the surrounding area. Forensic examination determined that the remains belonged to an adult woman who had died several days earlier and had been subjected to burning before being dismembered. At the same time, officers were investigating the disappearance of Chung, who had last been seen leaving her home in Pan Chung on the morning of 5 July. She had failed to meet her husband Law, at their roast meat shop later that day, prompting him to report her missing to police on the evening of 6 July. Detectives searched Chin's flat at Plover Cove Garden, where they discovered bloodstains in the living room and scorched patches in the bathroom. Tactical Unit officers conducted door-to-door enquiries at the building, while the investigating officers inspected the drainage and collected forensic evidence in the flat. These findings strengthened police suspicions that Chung had been killed in the flat.

During the investigation, Law told the investigating team that he had been involved in a long-term affair with Chin and had received a letter purportedly signed by Chung, instructing him to transfer ownership of their roast meat business and residence. Believing the letter to be suspicious and not written by his wife, Law reported his concerns to police, leading investigators to focus on Chin as a possible suspect. Police arrested Chin shortly after searching her flat at Plover Cove Garden. Officers also interviewed Chin's 10-year-old granddaughter, who told police that she had seen human remains in the flat. Chin had earlier taken her by taxi to Monkey's Hill in Kam Shan Country Park to dispose of the remains.

On 9 July, police searched a hillside in the country park in connection with Chung's disappearance and recovered three bags containing human remains. A woman's torso was found in one bag, while the head and other body parts were found in the other two. Police also conducted an underwater search of a nearby reservoir for the remaining body parts. Members of the Special Duties Unit (SDU), also known as the Flying Tigers, took part in the search, which lasted for more than an hour. No further remains were found.

According to Detective Constable Yuen Sum-kuen (Chinese: 袁心娟), Chin eventually admitted responsibility for Chung's death during police questioning, telling officers, "It has nothing to do with my granddaughter. It was I who killed Ah Kuen." (Note: "Ah Kuen" (阿娟) is a familiar Cantonese form of address for Chung Chor-kuen. South China Morning Post frequently refer to her by this nickname in quotations and witness testimony.) In her statements to police, Chin said that she had argued with Chung over money and the cancellation of her roast meat stall licence before tying her to a chair with a baby carrier and placing her in a chokehold. She stated that after Chung died, she purchased alcohol, paper offerings and candles, performed religious rites over the body, burned it in the bathtub, and later dismembered the remains with a kitchen chopper before disposing of them in Kam Shan Country Park.

== Trial of Chin Yin-ho ==
Chin Yin-ho
- 錢燕荷
- Born: 1946 (age 79–80)
- Conviction: Manslaughter
- Penalty: Six years' imprisonment

Details
- Victims: Chung Chor-kuen (deceased)
- Date: 5 July 1993
- Country: British Hong Kong
- State: Hong Kong
- Date apprehended: July 1993

Chin was charged with murder in July 1993. Her first trial ended without a verdict after the jury failed to reach a decision, and the judge discharged the jury and ordered a retrial. The retrial was held before a judge of the High Court in June 1994. During the proceedings, prosecutor Paul Dinan argued that Chin had deliberately taken Chung to her flat, restrained her against her will and intentionally killed her before attempting to destroy evidence by burning and dismembering the body. He also argued that Chin murdered Chung during a dispute over the roast meat stall after Law cancelled her licence. The defence argued that Chung's death occurred unintentionally during a struggle and that Chin had not planned to kill her. Dinan told the court that the remains recovered from Kam Shan Country Park were "disfigured beyond belief" and could only be identified through dental records. The judge agreed with the prosecution that the charred remains should not be presented as exhibits during the trial.

On 17 June 1994, Chin testified in her own defence. She claimed that she had brought Chung to her flat after learning that her roast meat stall licence had been cancelled, and that their discussion continued into the night. According to Chin, the argument escalated after Chung insulted her over her relationship with Law and threatened her with a fruit knife. Chin said the two women struggled before she pushed Chung onto a chair and restrained her with a baby carrier. She stated that she had put Chung in a chokehold but did not intend to kill her, and initially believed that Chung had only lost consciousness. Chin said that after discovering Chung had died, she panicked and attempted to conceal the crime by disposing of the body.

Law testified that Chin was "wicked" and had attempted to force Chung out of the business because she was jealous of Chung's success. When challenged by the defence, Law rejected suggestions that his description of Chin was exaggerated, stating that "she is in fact as bad as that." He also denied allegations that she was a "gold digger" and had borrowed HK$100,000 from Chin during their four-year affair. Defence counsel Anthony Mitchell-Heggs argued that Law was attempting to damage Chin's reputation because his feelings towards his former lover had changed. Mavis Law Lai-hung, a prosecution witness, testified during the retrial that Chin had first made threats against Chung in February 1992, after Chung left home upon discovering her husband Law's affair with Chin. She said Chin repeated similar threats several months before Chung's death, including statements about killing Chung and taking her own life. Mitchell-Heggs accused Mavis of "cooking up" a story to damage Chin's defence, arguing that her testimony was influenced by hostility towards the defendant.

During cross-examination, Dinan accused Chin of killing Chung in a "cold-blooded" manner and attempting to conceal the crime. Chin maintained that she had not intended to kill Chung and that the death occurred during a struggle. The defence argued that her actions were influenced by provocation and diminished responsibility, with psychiatrist Sylvia Chen testifying that Chin had a history of suicide attempts and was suffering from "reactive depression".

=== Verdict ===
On 29 June 1994, the jury found Chin not guilty of murder but guilty of the lesser offence of manslaughter. In sentencing, the judge described Chin's treatment of the body as "shameful and barbaric". The judge stated that, because the jury had found that Chin did not intend to kill Chung, he was required to treat the offence as a less serious category of manslaughter. The court sentenced her to six years' imprisonment.

== Aftermath ==
The six-year prison sentence imposed on Chin has been widely criticized by the family of Chung, stating that the sentence is too light compared to the surrounding context of the crime and the disposal of the body afterward. Chung's father, a retired dim sum chef, said that the family believed the crime had been planned and described the sentence as unfair. Following the conclusion of the trial, Chung's family launched a signature campaign in Sha Tin and Mong Kok calling for a heavier penalty for Chin. After the discovery of the remains, rumours circulated that parts of Chung's body had been processed into roast meat and sold to customers, although police stated that the claims were unsubstantiated. Police, however, stated that they had found no evidence to support these claims and treated them as unsubstantiated rumours.

== Media coverage ==
The case has been the subject of documentaries and television programmes in Hong Kong. The case was also adapted into the 1993 Hong Kong B-movie Human Flesh Tempura, which was released later in the same year as the incident. It later inspired the 1998 film The Untold Story 2. Although the film fictionalised several aspects of the incident, it broadly followed the story of Fung, a fictional character portrayed by Singaporean actress Alien Sun, who kills her lover's wife and disposes of the body by burning and dismemberment. The film was marketed as a standalone sequel, but drew from the real-life Tai Po Plover Cove Garden burning corpse case.

The case was also adapted in the TVB crime drama Crime Story (重案解密). The seventh episode was based on the incident, although the programme changed the identities of the victim and perpetrator for dramatic purposes. The adaptation renewed public discussion of the case and introduced the incident to viewers who were unfamiliar with the original events.
