= Full Alert =

Full Alert may refer to:

- Full Alert (film), 1997 Hong Kong film
- an episode of Stargate SG-1 season 8
