= Heijin =

Heijin may refer to:

- Black gold (politics), a term used in Taiwan to refer to political corruption, especially businesses with organized crime societies
- Island of Greed, a 1997 Hong Kong film about Taiwan's "black gold" politics
