= Healing Hearts (film) =

2000 Hong Kong film by Gary Tang

- Directed by: Gary Tang
- Written by: Gary Tang
- Produced by: Wong Jing
- Starring: Tony Leung; Michele Reis
- Cinematography: Cheung Man-po
- Edited by: Kwong Chi-leung
- Release date: September 30, 2000
- Running time: 107 minutes
- Country: Hong Kong
- Language: Cantonese
- Box office: HK$15.5 million

Healing Hearts (Chinese: 俠骨仁心) is a 2000 Hong Kong romantic drama film written and directed by Gary Tang, and starring Tony Leung Chiu-wai and Michelle Reis.

== Plot ==
Lawrence and Paul are neurologists at the same hospital and also close friends. Paul's girlfriend, Jackie, becomes comatose after an accident and falls into a vegetative state. Despite this, Paul remains undeterred. He visits her every day, speaking to her and hoping she will miraculously wake up.

By a twist of fate, it is Lawrence who ultimately brings Jackie out of her coma. However, after regaining consciousness, Jackie seems different and gently turns down Paul's romantic advances. Now alone, Jackie searches for a place with low rent and happens to run into Lawrence. The two strike a deal: Jackie will temporarily stay at Lawrence's home until she finds a job.

Sharing the same living space, the two slowly fall into a tender and romantic relationship. But the happiness doesn't last long. Lawrence discovers that Jackie has a brain tumor and could face death once again at any moment. This time, they are just as helpless as before.

== Cast ==
- Tony Leung Chiu-wai as Lawrence
- Michelle Reis as Jackie, Paul's recently comatose girlfriend
- Kenny Bee as Doctor Paul
- Pinky Cheung as Nurse Karen
- Esther Kwan as Samantha
- Stephen Fung as Alan

== Production ==
The film was shot concurrently alongside a television pilot for a television series on Asia Television also entitled Healing Hearts. This is not to be confused with the medical drama television series Healing Hands (1998), which director Gary Tang also wrote.

== Reception ==
Paul Fonoroff for the South China Morning Post wrote, "Leung proves that he is an alchemist, for he delivers a first-rate performance that, although failing to transform the dreck into gelt, provides Healing Hearts with its most watchable moments."

== Soundtrack ==
The film features Patti Austin's "Say That You Love Me".
