= Angel Wong =

Malaysian actress

Wong Chui Ling
- Born: Hong Kong
- Occupations: TV and radio personality

Wong Chui-ling (Chinese: 王翠玲), also known as Chui Ling, is a Hong Kong-born Malaysia-based host, speaker, soft skills coach, TV and radio personality, and entrepreneur.

She has worked in the entertainment industry for over 20 years, presenting TV and radio programmes.

In her earlier days, Chui Ling hosted the popular On The Beat TV programme - a weekly variety info and entertainment show. She later co-hosted the daily morning show on WAFM, a Malaysian Chinese radio station, before moving on to Astro's MYFM 101.8 where she had a daily 5-minute segment called Chui Ling's Drivetime Mall. She then became part of the founding presenter team for Melody FM103, helming their breakfast show, Morning Boss, for 5 years, before moving on to do her own thing.

She was also a frequent host of Astro Wah Lai Toi programmes (the country’s satellite station’s premier Chinese channel) and annually hosts the feng shui-inspired Feng Shui Voyage with Joey Yap. She is also well known for the extremely popular food programmes, Recipes, with Love, Menu Please and One Day Five Meals, as well as Ladies Sdn Bhd and Tohoku Travel Blog by HK-TVB. She has two publications to her name, too.

These days, Chui Ling juggles her time between her home, public engagements, speaking and training engagements, media agency and her businesses. She was also instrumental in the formation of the Malaysian Postpartum Care Association and serves as honorary advisor.

== Filmography ==
Films

- I Love Wing Chun (2011)
- Lady Iron Chef (2006)
- Anna and the King (1999)
- Armageddon (1997)
- Ebola Syndrome (1996)
- Top Banana Club (1996)

Drama series

- Sourire Pour Moi guest appearance (Astro AEC 2008)
- Eu Yan Sang Bak Foong Pills mini series (Astro Wah Lai Toi 2007)
- Homecoming 己子當歸 Seasons 1 & 2 (Astro Wah Lai Toi 2003-2004)

Variety shows

- Feng Shui Voyage 2010-2021
- Chase Joey 2020
- Feng Shui Odyssey 2018
- Health 123 (guest appearance)
- King of Health (guest appearance)
- 明星市集游乐团 KL
- Maria's Auspicious Menu
- Cabinets of Chinese Metaphysics
- Walking the Dragons
- Genting Tour with Chef Hugo Leong
- Maurice Lacroix Private Sessions
- Lingering Flavours by American Express
- Recipes, with Love
- Menu Please
- Ladies Sdn Bhd
- One Day Five Meals 一日五餐 (Astro Wah Lai Toi 2007)
- Miss Astro Chinese International Pageant Astro 國際華裔小姐競選 Challenge (Astro Wah Lai Toi 2006-2007)
- Astro Annual TV Awards Astro华丽台电视剧大奖 (Astro Wah Lai Toi 2005-2007)
- Current Affairs with Chui Ling (NTV7 2006)
- Family Happy Hour (NTV7 2004)
- Malay variety programme, Inspector Arrow - The Recycling Hero (TV3 2002) - director
- On The Beat (TV3 2000-2002) - director/host

Game shows

- I am a TV Buff (Astro Wah Lai Toi 2005-2007)
- Dare to Refresh with Shell Helix (NTV7 2005)

Travelogues

- EGL Tohoku Travel Blog 雪映移城 (HK-TVB 2006)

Sports programmes

- FIFA World Cup Live in Genting 2006
- Astro Equestrian Channel 501 (2005–2006)
- Selangor/Penang/Ipoh Turf Club Horse Racing Live (Astro Wah Lai Toi 2002-2004)

== Radio ==
- WAFM 97.6 Morning show (2003–2005)
- MYFM 101.8 Chui Ling's drive time segment 翠LING架勢廣場 (2006-2012)
- Melody FM103 Morning Boss (2012-2018)

== Books ==
- One Day Five Meals 一日五餐
- Tastefully Chic

== TED Talk ==
- TEDxUTAR Kampar: Say What You Mean, Mean What You Say

== Awards ==
=== 2020 ===
- Famous Brands Malaysia - Most Ad Value Artist in Malaysia 大马著名品牌奖 - “最具广告价值艺人奖”
- 《女人行表扬会2020》Women Glamour Award - "亚洲华人女影响力"
- 《商海领航 · 百企明传》ShangHai Elite Entrepreneurs Book of Fame 2020

=== 2019 ===
- McMillan Woods Global Award – Innovative Postnatal Care Excellence 创新产后护理卓越奖
- The Page Elite Entrepreneurs 2019 商页菁英特刊2019
- Her Dream Awards 2019 – Outstanding Artist Award 她与梦想杰出女性典范奖 - 影艺卓越

=== 2017/2018 ===
- Elegante International Business Award 2017/2018 – The Phenomenal Elegante Award 企爵奖2017/2018 - “非凡女企业精英奖”

=== 2017 ===
- Shang Hai Elite Entrepreneurs 2017 商海风云人物
- The Malaysia Book of Records Business Edition – Women of Achievement《马来西亚纪录大全商企版之辉煌人物》卓越企业女杰之一

=== 2016 ===
- The 100 Most Influential Young Entrepreneurs 2016 (The 100 MIYE) 2016年100位最具影响力青年企业家

=== 2013 ===
- McMillan Woods Global Awards for Outstanding Achiever Artiste of the Year
