= Up for the Rising Sun =

1997 Hong Kong film by Victor Tam

- Directed by: Victor Tam Long Cheung
- Based on: the book of the same name.
- Produced by: Raymond Wong Pak Ming
- Starring: George Lam Chi Cheung; Gordon Lam
- Release date: 1997
- Country: Hong Kong
- Language: Cantonese

Up for the Rising Sun (Cantonese: Yung po giu yeung) is a Hong Kong movie released in 1997, based on the book of the same name.

It was directed by Victor Tam Long Cheung, and produced by Raymond Wong Pak Ming.

== Cast ==
- George Lam Chi Cheung
- Gordon Lam
- Law Shu Kei
- Poon Hung
- Pauline Suen
- Kenneth Tsang Kong
- Raymond Tso Wing Lim
- Anita Yuen Wing Yee
- Jessica Hester Hsuan
