= A Kid from Tibet =

1991 Hong Kong film by Yuen Biao

- US DVD cover
- Directed by: Yuen Biao
- Written by: Barry Wong; Sam Chi-leung; Chan Kam-cheong
- Produced by: Yuen Biao
- Starring: Yuen Biao; Michelle Reis; Yuen Wah; Nina Li Chi; Wu Ma
- Cinematography: Arthur Wong; Chan Tung-chuen
- Edited by: Marco Mak
- Music by: Violet Lam
- Distributed by: Golden Harvest
- Release date: 21 December 1991
- Running time: 97 minutes
- Country: Hong Kong
- Languages: Cantonese; Tibetan
- Box office: HK$10,384,155

A Kid from Tibet (Chinese: 西藏小子) is a 1991 Hong Kong martial arts action film starring and directed by Yuen Biao, who also produced. The film was written by Barry Wong, Sam Chi-leung, and Chan Kam-cheong. The film features two more former members of the Seven Little Fortunes: Yuen Wah as an evil sorcerer and a cameo appearance from Jackie Chan. A Kid From Tibet is Yuen's only credit as director. It was filmed in Taiwan, Hong Kong and partly on location in Tibet.

== Plot ==
When the evil "Black Section of Esoteric Buddhism" had tried to invade Tibet years ago, the Tibetan monks used a powerful magical item, the "Babu Gold Bottle" to expel them. The Tibetan master (Wu Ma) has the bottle's cap and wishes to reunite it with the bottle as the Black Section are stirring once more. He sends a young monk, Wong La (Yuen Biao) to Hong Kong to recover the sacred bottle, which is in the possession of a crippled lawyer.

Wong meets and protects a woman, Chiu Seng-Neng (Michelle Reis) who is acting as the agent for the lawyer, and the Black Section fight to gain the magical bottle for themselves.

The leader of the Black Section (Yuen Wah) learns of the intended hand-over, and seeks to get the Babu Gold Bottle for himself.

== Cast ==
- Yuen Biao as Lo Ba Wong La
- Michelle Reis as Chiu Seng-neng
- Yuen Wah as Black Section Sorcerer
- Nina Li Chi as Sorcerer's Sister
- Roy Chiao as Lawyer Robinson
- Michael Dingo as Michael
- Wu Ma as Wong's Master
- Billy Lau as Airport Security Guard / Jail Warden
- Lau Chau-sang (Fung Lee) as Tibetan henchman
- Lay Kah as Tibetan henchman
- Jackie Chan as Airport Passenger (cameo)
- Kingdom Yuen as Mimi
- Gabriel Wong as Mimi's lover
- Anthony Carpio as Black Section Sorcerer's Henchman
- Jack Wong
- Corey Yuen
- Lee Ming-yeung as Mr. Bao
- Bruce Law

== See also ==
- List of Hong Kong films
- Jackie Chan filmography
