= The Untold Story 2 =

1998 Hong Kong film by Andy Ng

- Film poster
- Directed by: Andy Ng Yiu Kuen
- Written by: Law Kam-Fai
- Produced by: Danny Lee
- Starring: Alien Sun; Emotion Cheung; Anthony Wong; Yeung Fan
- Cinematography: Ko Chiu-Lam
- Edited by: Choi Hung
- Music by: Wong Yim
- Production company: Mei Ah Entertainment
- Distributed by: Cameron Entertainment Co. Magnum Films Ltd. (Hong Kong)
- Release date: 25 April 1998
- Running time: 91 minutes
- Country: Hong Kong
- Language: Cantonese

The Untold Story 2, a.k.a. Human Flesh Bun 2 (Chinese: 人肉叉燒包II之天誅地滅), is a 1998 Hong Kong film directed by Andy Ng Yiu Kuen. It is a sequel to The Untold Story, and also stars Anthony Wong, albeit in a different role.

Despite it having no relationship to the prior movie, it is also based on a true crime, in this case the Tai Po Plover Cove Garden murder in 1993, in which the murderer operated a siu mei shop and disposed of his victim's corpse by deep-frying and chopping it up, which was compared to chopping Siu yuk.

== Plot ==
An unhappily married couple, Chung and his wife Kuen in Hong Kong invite the wife's beautiful cousin, who has survived a horrifying experience in mainland China, to live with them. She has her own special way of overcoming hardship and becomes the master of the barbecue.

== Cast ==
Actor	Role
Alien Sun	Fung
Anthony Wong	Officer Lazyboots
Emotion Cheung	Chung
Yeung Fan	Kuen
Melvin Wong	Police Captain
Law Lan	Sik Sam Po
Jamie Luk	Sik Gei
