= Lonely Tree, Lonely Bird =

Studio album by Wu Bai & China Blue
- Released: January 12, 1998
- Genre: Art rock; alternative rock; Hokkien pop
- Length: 53:54
- Language: Hokkien
- Label: Magic Stone
- Producer: Wu Bai & China Blue

Wu Bai & China Blue chronology
The End of Love (1996)	Lonely Tree, Lonely Bird (1998)	White Dove (1999)

Lonely Tree, Lonely Bird (Chinese: 樹枝孤鳥; Pe̍h-ōe-jī: Chhiū-ki Ko͘-chiáu) is the first Taiwanese Hokkien studio album and fourth studio album overall by Taiwanese rock band Wu Bai & China Blue, released on January 12, 1998. Musically, the album incorporates a wide range of styles including jazz, folk, rock, electronica, and pop.

Lonely Tree, Lonely Bird was a great commercial success, selling over 600,000 copies in Taiwan, and is considered to be one of Wu Bai's most influential works. To support the album, Wu Bai embarked on the Air Alert (空襲警報) concert tour across Taiwan, Malaysia, and Singapore, which sold over 120,000 tickets.

== Background and recording ==
With the lifting of martial law in 1987 and further liberalization efforts in Taiwan in the early 1990s, the New Taiwanese Song movement gained prominence as many Taiwanese artists began singing in languages other than Mandarin, such as Hokkien, Hakka, or the aboriginal languages. However, by the mid-to-late 1990s, the movement began to subside due to the dominance of Mandopop.

Wu Bai himself was disappointed by the quality of Taiwanese Hokkien songs at this time, believing them to simply be Mandarin-based melodies sung in the Hokkien language. The creative inspiration for the album was based on a vision of what Taiwan's music scene would be like if the Kuomintang had not suppressed songs in the Hokkien language. This scenario inspired Wu Bai to blend the singing techniques of traditional Taiwanese song with modern genres such as rock or electronica.

Recording for the album took place in Wu Bai's rehearsal space in Tianmu, which was converted into a recording studio.

== Reception ==
Lonely Tree, Lonely Bird was a commercial success, selling over 600,000 copies. The album won the 10th Golden Melody Award for Album of the Year in 1999 and received nominations for Golden Melody Awards for Best Male Taiwanese Singer and Best Lyrics.

In 2009, the album was ranked number 5 on a list of "200 Best Taiwanese Popular Music Albums (1993-2005)".

== Track listing ==
All tracks are written by Wu Bai.

No.	Title	Length
1.	"Young Girl’s Heart" (少女的心)	4:35
2.	"Broken Heart Poetry" (斷腸詩)	3:36
3.	"Hustling" (漂浪)	4:05
4.	"Back to Hometown" (返去故鄉)	5:48
5.	"Long Way Fall" (萬丈深坑)	4:09
6.	"Farewell My Love" (心愛的再會啦)	5:35
7.	"Wandering at Night City" (徘徊夜都市)	4:22
8.	"Crush On You" (煞到你)	3:01
9.	"Air Alert" (空襲警報)	4:04
10.	"Lonely Tree, Lonely Bird" (樹枝孤鳥)	4:57
11.	"Mist In The Wind" (飛在風中的小雨)	4:15
12.	"Sigh" (怨嗟嘆)	5:27
Total length:		53:54

== Charts ==
Chart (1998)	Peak position
Taiwanese Albums (IFPI Taiwan)	2
