= Ebola Syndrome =

1996 Hong Kong exploitation film by Herman Yau

- Film poster
- Directed by: Herman Yau
- Written by: Ting Chau
- Produced by: Wong Jing
- Starring: Anthony Wong
- Cinematography: Puccini Yu
- Edited by: Choi Hung
- Music by: Mak Chun Hung
- Distributed by: Gala Film Distribution Limited
- Release date: 15 June 1996 (Hong Kong)
- Running time: 98 minutes
- Country: Hong Kong
- Languages: Cantonese; English

Ebola Syndrome (Chinese: 伊波拉病毒) is a 1996 Hong Kong Category III exploitation film directed by Herman Yau and starring Anthony Wong.

== Plot ==
Living in Hong Kong in 1986, Kai San works for Kwan. Kai has sex with Kwan's wife. Kwan catches them, and the wife accuses Kai of assaulting her. In the ensuing fight, Kai kills Kwan, his wife and henchman. He is about to kill Kwan's daughter Lily, but is interrupted. Now a wanted convict, Kai flees to South Africa.

Ten years later, Kai works as a chef in a Chinese restaurant. His boss, Kei, and Kei's wife bully Kai frequently. Meanwhile, Lily is now a young woman working as a flight attendant. She goes to Kai's restaurant and gets sick when she is near him.

Trying to get some cheap pig meat, Kei goes to see the Zulu tribe and he brings Kai with him. The tribe performs a ceremony around several members who are sick. Kei buys the pigs. On the way home, Kai crashes the car into a tree. As Kei fixes the car, Kai wanders off and sees a dying infected member of the tribe, where he rapes and kills her. Shortly afterward, Kai gets a fever. The doctor says he has the Ebola virus. Kai is one of the rare people immune to Ebola and becomes a living carrier who can spread the disease to others through bodily fluids.

While Kei is out, his wife talks about killing Kai. Kai overhears and attacks her. Then, Kei returns to the restaurant. He tries to defend his wife, but Kai kills him. Next, after raping Kei's wife, Kai rips her right eyeball out and kills her as well. And, when the wife's cousin stops by, Kai also kills him. He cuts up all of the corpses and serves them to the restaurant's customers as hamburgers. Lily and her boyfriend go back to the restaurant, and she realizes who Kai is. They go to the police, who cannot do anything without evidence. Many people in the area start getting sick. Using Kei's money, Kai returns to Hong Kong. He has sex with two prostitutes and both of them get sick. Working together, the South African police, the Hong Kong police and Lily figure out that Kai is the person spreading the virus.

Kai meets up with his ex-girlfriend Har, who now has a husband and daughter. Kai buys Har from her husband and spreads the virus to many people, including Lily. He has sex with Har. Afterward, Har learns about Kai's disease and attempts to leave him. Kai grabs a knife and takes the daughter hostage to keep the police from taking him into custody. He spits in random people's faces. While trying to get away, he strangles Har's daughter to death. Inspector Yeung then lights Kai on fire and shoots him repeatedly, killing him. A dog eats a piece of Kai's flesh that he had cut off, and then returns to its owner, likely continuing the spread of Ebola.

== Cast ==
- Anthony Wong as Kai San
- Lo Mang as Boss Kei
- Lu Cheung as Kei's wife
- Wan Yeung-ming as Inspector Yeung
- Mariane Chan as Har
- Angel Wong as Lily Chow
- Ng Shui Ting as Lily's boyfriend
- Shing Fui-On as Boss Kwan
- Tsang Yin as Kwan's wife
- Yip Sin-yi as prostitute
- Lori Shannon as prostitute
- Peter Ngor as Ma
- Bobby Yip as Short Ugly Triad

== Release ==
Ebola Syndrome was released in Hong Kong on 15 June 1996. On Rotten Tomatoes, the film has a 20% rating with five reviews.
