= Wu Bai =

Taiwanese singer and actor (born 1968)

- 伍佰
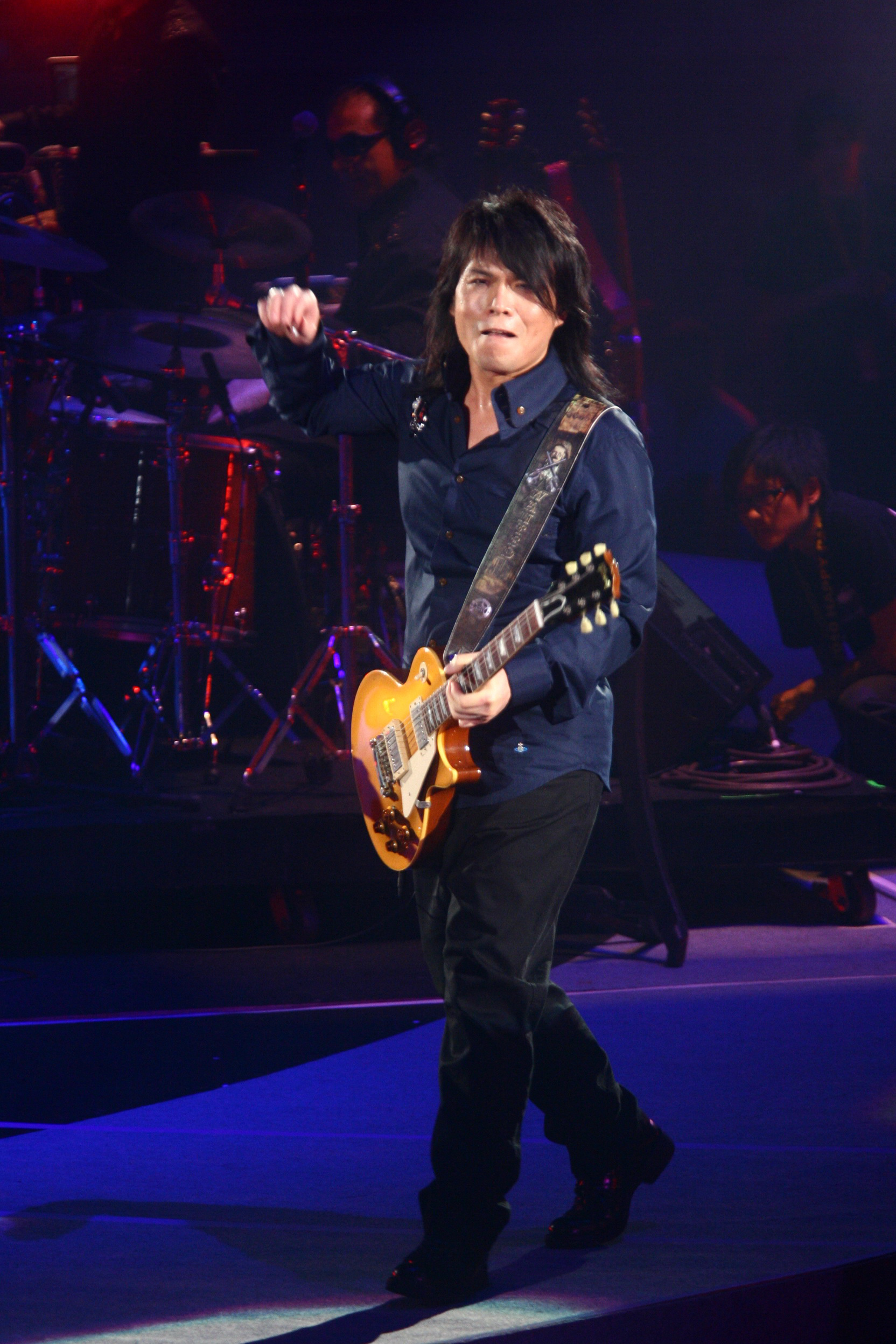
- Wu in 2010
- Born: Wu Chun-lin (吳俊霖); Ngô͘ Chùn-lîm (Hokkien); 14 January 1968 (age 58); Chiayi, Taiwan
- Occupations: Singer-songwriter, actor, record producer, photographer
- Years active: 1991–present
- Spouse: Chen Wen-pey (m. 2003)
- Musical career
- Also known as: Wu Pai
- Genres: Rock, blues rock, hard rock
- Instruments: Guitar; vocals; trumpet; keyboards; drums
- Labels: Pony Canyon; Rock Records; Avex Trax; Universal Music
- Member of: Wu Bai & China Blue
- Website: www.wubai.com

Wu Chun-lin (Chinese: 吳俊霖; pinyin: Wú Jùnlín; Pe̍h-ōe-jī: Ngô͘ Chùn-lîm; born 14 January 1968), better known by his stage name Wu Bai (Chinese: 伍佰; pinyin: Wǔ Bǎi; Pe̍h-ōe-jī: Gō͘-pah), is a Taiwanese rock singer, songwriter and actor. He formed the band Wu Bai & China Blue with Dean Zavolta (drums), Yu Ta-hao (keyboards), and Chu Chien-hui (bass guitar). Wu is the lead guitarist and vocalist of the band. Dubbed "The King of Live Music", Wu is considered to be one of the biggest pop music stars in East and Southeast Asia.

Wu is one of the biggest rock stars in Mandarin-language music markets. He also has released a number of works performed in Taiwanese Hokkien. He writes almost all of his own songs for his albums and also writes for many popular artists including Andy Lau, Emil Chau, Karen Mok, Tarcy Su, and Vivian Hsu. His guitar-driven rock music differs from that of many Mandopop or Cantopop stars and, with his Taiwanese Mandarin accent and rough looks, he projects an image of an archetypal Taiwanese punkster (taike) in his music and film roles.

== Early life ==
Wu was born in Suantou, Liujiao in Chiayi County in south-central Taiwan. His father was a retired Taiwan Sugar Corporation worker and his mother a betel nut vendor, and he had two younger brothers who died in a car accident. His nickname Wu Bai, meaning "five hundred", was given to him by his neighbours, after his early academic success when he scored 100 points on each of five examination subjects when he was studying at primary school.

== Career ==
=== Early career and the formation of China Blue ===
Wu left Chiayi County for the capital of Taipei in the late 1980s and worked in a number of menial jobs. One of those jobs in a music shop led to the formation of his first band, Buzz, which soon broke up.

Dean Zavolta describes the formation of Wu Bai & China Blue noting that the members originally "played for different bands up until about 1991, after which [Chu Chien-hui] and I began jamming together with the eventual idea of forming a newer, fresher, and original rock band ... Then one day, he called me up and asked me if I would mind filling in for a one-off gig with himself and a guitarist named Wu Bai ... Something just clicked between us. Both the music and the mo chi (默契 – chemistry) we had were fantastic. What really helped us though, was that when we first came out, Taiwan—along with other Asian countries—was ready for an Asian rock band that played live music."

Wu debuted with two songs on the Taiwanese-language Dust of Angels soundtrack in 1992 which were credited to his real name, Wu Chun-lin, and featured Chu Chien-hui and Dean Zavolta credited as China Blue. The same year, Pony Canyon Taiwan released Wu's first album, Loving Others is a Happy Thing, a solo effort credited to Wu, and featuring each of the three other current China Blue members on at least one song but without the group being mentioned by name. The 1993 soundtrack to Treasure Island featured Wu with the three members of China Blue designated as such. All subsequent albums as of 2007 have been credited to Wu Bai & China Blue.

=== Growing popularity ===
Wu's initial releases were followed by performing live at pubs throughout Taiwan, notably Sleeping Earth in Taipei and, upon its closure, Live A Go-Go. As his fan base grew, "Friday with Wu Bai" became a weekly event for many listeners, especially college students. Based on this increasing popularity, Wu was given a contract with Rock Records' Mandala Works, which released his second album Wanderer's Love Song and accompanying music videos. Sales were limited but Wu's following continued to grow due to his live performances.

=== Music and film success ===
In January 1996, Wu Bai & China Blue brought their powerful live show to Hong Kong for the first time to great success and Wu began to be known as Taiwan's "King of Live Music." Later that year they released the smash hit album The End of Love, which, propelled by the hit single "Norwegian Forest," sold over 600,000 copies and was honored by the China Times and the United Evening News as one of the year's Top 10 albums. The album also ranked in the Top 20 Music Videos on television's Channel [V] and was nominated by MTV for the best music video of the year.

In January 1998, Wu released his first album in Taiwanese Hokkien, Lonely Tree, Lonely Bird, to critical acclaim. It sold over 600,000 copies and won the Golden Melody Award for Album of the Year, alongside nominations for Best Male Taiwanese Singer and Best Lyrics, in 1999.

In June 1998, after representing Taiwan Beer in its new television commercial, Wu also appeared in a Chinese movie A Beautiful New World, playing the part of a street singer. He also wrote and sang the title song for the movie.

In 1999, Wu had a small role in The Personals, a motion picture with good box office sales. That November, Wu released a Mandarin album, White Dove, and started a tour of three cities in Taiwan. He held six sold-out concerts in a gigantic tent called "Super Dome", which was also a ground breaking event for the Taiwanese concert scene. The album and the concerts were the first big events after Taiwan's devastating earthquake, which comforted so many people's broken hearts. As a result, Wu was voted as the most popular singer of the year, and also rank number three as the Man of the Year, outranking the President of the Republic of China Lee Teng-hui.

In the year 2000, Wu wrote and sang the theme song for the Pili movie Legend of the Sacred Stone. This time his backing music had a full orchestra, and the lyrics were written in Classical Chinese. Between March and April, Wu Bai and China Blue held three concerts in Singapore, Malaysia and Hong Kong. In Singapore, the Straits Times' headline after the concert was "King of Chinese Rock", in Malaysia, the media headline was "Cult Master arrived, all congregation bowed." and in Hong Kong, the whole audience stood up in a stadium that has rules against standing during concerts. After these phenomenal successes, Wu sang at Taiwan's new president's inauguration, Singapore's National Day concert, and Japan Fukuoka's Music Festival. In Fukuoka, Japanese audiences all stood up to enjoy the concert even though they likely did not understand the lyrics. Wu has also appeared in Tsui Hark's movie Time and Tide as the lead actor, and also wrote two songs for the soundtrack.

== Music ==
Wu listened to 1970s English-language rock music such as Led Zeppelin and Jimi Hendrix in his formative years and has said he felt it unusual for a Taiwanese person to play the guitar. Prior to Wu Bai & China Blue's achieving widespread popularity in Taiwan in the mid-1990s, guitar-oriented rock music was unusual in the country's domestic popular music scene. Live concerts were similarly rare but the group's frequent touring and live album releases set a new standard for live performing in Taiwan. The band's distinctive blend of poetical lyrics with rock tunes has won them fans not only in Taiwan but throughout East and Southeast Asia.

== Personal life ==
In 2003, Wu married Chen Wen-pey (陳文珮; Pe̍h-ōe-jī: Tân Bûn-pòe), his manager and girlfriend for over 10 years, in a private ceremony in Fukuoka, Japan.

Wu is an avid fan of Japanese pro wrestling, and has even written a theme song for his close friend, Keiji Mutoh.

== Discography ==
=== Studio albums ===
- 愛上別人是快樂的事 (Loving Others is a Happy Thing) (1992)
- 浪人情歌 (Wanderer's Love Song) (1994)
- 愛情的盡頭 (The End of Love) (1996)
- 樹枝孤鳥 (Pe̍h-ōe-jī: Chhiū-ki Ko͘-chiáu; Lonely Tree, Lonely Bird) (1998)
- 世界第一等 (Pe̍h-ōe-jī: Sè-kài Tē-it-téng; No. 1 in the World) EP (1998)
- 白鴿 (White Dove) (1999)
- 伍佰&CHINA BLUE電影歌曲典藏 / 順流逆流電影原聲帶 (Wu Bai & China Blue Movie Song Book / Time and Tide Soundtrack) (2000)
- 夢的河流 (Dream River) (2001)
- 淚橋 (Tear Bridge) (2003) (CD+VCD)
- 雙面人 (Pe̍h-ōe-jī: Siang-bīn-lâng; Two Faced Man) (2005)
- GO PA 人面鯊 (2005)
- 純真年代 (Innocent Years) (2006) (CD+DVD)
- 忘情1015 新歌+精選 (2007) (CD+DVD)
- 太空彈 (Spacebomb) (2008)
- 詩情搖滾 (Poetic Rock) (2009) (CD+DVD)
- 單程車票 (One Way Ticket) (2011)
- 無盡閃亮的哀愁 (Endless Shining Sadness) (2013)
- 釘子花 (Pe̍h-ōe-jī: Teng-chú-hoe) (2016)
- 讓水倒流 (jang4 shui3 tao4 liu2) (2019)
- 純白的起點 (Fresh Start) (2023)

=== Live albums ===
- 伍佰的LIVE (1995)
- 夏夜晚風 (1997)
- 伍佰97亞洲巡弋紀念盤EP (1997)
- 空襲警報Pe̍h-ōe-jī: Khong-si̍p Kèng-pò (1999)
- 1999~2000真世界巡迴演唱會全紀錄 (2000)
- 冬之火 (2002)
- 伍佰力 (2004)
- 2005厲害演唱會全紀錄 (2005)
- 妳是我的花朵演唱會全紀錄（2007）
- 生命的現場 Life Live (2012)
- 光和熱 (2015)
- 伍佰 and China Blue 雙面對決演唱會全紀錄 Two Face Concert Live in Taipei Arena (2018)

=== Soundtracks ===
- Dust of Angels (少年吔，安啦！; Pe̍h-ōe-jī: Siáu-liân--ê, an-lah) (1992) – 2 songs
- Treasure Island soundtrack (只要為你活一天; Pe̍h-ōe-jī: Chí-iàu ūi-lí oa̍h chi̍t-kang) (1993) – 2 songs
- Time and Tide soundtrack (順流逆流) (2000)
- Legend of the Sacred Stone soundtrack (聖石傳說; Pe̍h-ōe-jī: Sèng-chio̍h-thoân-soat) (2000)

=== Music and concert videos ===
- 2005厲害演唱會全紀錄 (2005)
- 妳是我的花朵演唱會全紀錄（2007）
- 太空彈 世界巡迴演唱會精選實錄 (2009)

== Filmography ==
=== Film ===
Year	English title	Original title	Role	Notes
1988	Gangland Odyssey	大頭仔	Runner	
1993	Treasure Island	只要為你活一天	Percussion band member	
1998	The Personals	徵婚啓事	Musician	
1999	A Beautiful New World	美麗新世界	Liang	
2000	Time and Tide	順流逆流	Jack	
2007	Arthur and the Invisibles	—N/a	Emperor Maltazard	Mandarin dub
2004	New Police Story	新警察故事	Father of Frank Cheng	
2016	Mrs K	—N/a	Mr. K	
2017	The Thousand Faces of Dunjia	奇門遁甲	Boss	
2023	Good Morni MIT	山椒魚來了	Himself	Voice-over
2024	Tales of Taipei	愛情城事	Jack	

=== Television series ===
Year	English title	Original title	Role	Notes
2004	Say Yes Enterprise	求婚事務所	Chieh	
2014	In a Good Way	我的自由年代	Singer	Cameo

=== Music video appearances ===
Year	Artist	Song title
1996	Tarcy Su	"Passive" ("被動")
1996	Wanfang	"Then What Would You Say" ("然後你怎麼說")
1997	Faith Yang	"One" ("一個人")
1998	Karen Mok	"Reason to Be Strong" ("堅強的理由")
2002	Chang Chen-yue	"Hands in Pockets" ("雙手插口袋")
2012	Yisa Yu	"You Don't Want Me Already" ("你不要我了嗎")

== Photography books ==
- 伍佰‧風景 (Fēngjǐng) (Scenery)
- 伍佰‧故事 (Gùshì) (Story)
- 伍佰‧台北 (Táiběi) (Taipei)

== Awards and nominations ==
Year	Award	Category	Nominated work	Result
1992	29th Golden Horse Awards	Best Original Film Score	Dust of Angels	Nominated
1997	1997 MTV Video Music Awards	International Viewer's Choice Award for MTV Mandarin	"End of Love" (as Wu Bai & China Blue)	Nominated
1998	17th Hong Kong Film Awards	Best Original Film Song	Island of Greed – "Tears of a Lonely Star" (composer and lyricist)	Nominated
1998	9th Golden Melody Awards	Best Mandarin Male Singer	Rock Romance	Nominated
1999	10th Golden Melody Awards	Album of the Year	Lonely Tree, Lonely Bird	Won
2002	MTV Asia Awards 2002	Favorite Artist – Taiwan	—N/a	Nominated
2006	17th Golden Melody Awards	Song of the Year	"Made in Taiwan"	Nominated
2017	28th Golden Melody Awards	Album of the Year	釘子花(Pe̍h-ōe-jī: Teng-chú-hoe)	Nominated
2017	28th Golden Melody Awards	Song of the Year	"Peng Kung"	Nominated
2017	28th Golden Melody Awards	Best Album – Taiwanese	釘子花(Pe̍h-ōe-jī: Teng-chú-hoe)	Won
2017	28th Golden Melody Awards	Best Lyricist	"蹦孔(Pe̍h-ōe-jī: pōng-khang)"	Nominated
2017	28th Golden Melody Awards	Best Arrangement	"蹦孔(Pe̍h-ōe-jī: pōng-khang)"	Nominated
2017	28th Golden Melody Awards	Best Male Vocalist – Taiwanese	釘子花(Pe̍h-ōe-jī: Teng-chú-hoe)	Nominated
