= The Golden Girls (film) =

1995 Hong Kong film by Joe Ma

- Film poster
- Traditional Chinese: 山水有相逢
- Simplified Chinese: 山水有相逢
- Hanyu Pinyin: Shān Shuǐ Yǒu Xiāng Féng
- Jyutping: Saan1 Seoi2 Jau2 Seong1 Fung4
- Directed by: Joe Ma
- Written by: Cheung Chi-sing; Joe Ma
- Produced by: Cheung Chi-sing
- Starring: Lau Ching-wan; Anita Yuen; Ada Choi; Alien Sun
- Cinematography: Apple Kwan
- Edited by: Eric Kwong
- Music by: Clarence Hui; Joseph Hwang; Ronald Ng
- Production company: Win's Entertainment
- Distributed by: China Star Entertainment Group
- Release date: 16 November 1995 (Hong Kong)
- Running time: 94 minutes
- Country: Hong Kong
- Language: Cantonese
- Box office: HK$10,091,650

The Golden Girls (Chinese: 山水有相逢) is a 1995 Hong Kong romantic comedy film directed by Joe Ma and starring Lau Ching-wan and Anita Yuen. The film is not related to the American TV sitcom of the same name.

== Cast ==
- Lau Ching-wan as Chun-wai
- Anita Yuen as Mei-ball
- Ada Choi as Lulu Shum
- Alien Sun as May Chu
- Allen Fong as Assistant director
- Nancy Lan as Assistant director
- Manfred Wong as Director of Cleopatra
- Francis Ng as Wong Siu-yi
- Cheung Tat-ming as Cousin J.P.
- Yeung Bing-lam as Lam Sin
- Pak Yiu-charn as Studio boss
- Wong Yat-fei as Brother Choi
- Vincent Kok as Kent
- Michael Tse as Fey Leading Man
- Lee Lik-chi as Priest
- Josephine Koo as Sister Sen
- Tin Kai-man as Trainee actor with cigarette in mouth
- Chan Hau-yee as New actress
- Cheung Chi-sing as Cinematographer
- Cheuk Wai-man as Studio boss' secretary
- David Lai as Projectionist
- Leung Pui-san as Trainee actress
- June Chan as Trainee actress
- Irsi Chai as Trainee actress
- Perry Chiu as Trainee actress
- Lok Sze-man as Trainee actress
- Chan Chor-man as Trainee actress
- Alan Mak as Assistant director
- Lam Suk-foon as Make up artist A
- Irene Kong as Make up artist B
- Lung Chi-shing as Traitor
- Chan Hing-hang as Cinematographer
- Wong Wa-wo as Reporter
- So Wai-nam as Cousin's bodyguard

== See also ==
- List of Hong Kong films
