= Lifeline (1997 film) =

1996 Hong Kong film by Johnnie To

- Film poster

Chinese name
- Traditional Chinese: 十萬火急
- Simplified Chinese: 十万火急
Transcriptions
Standard Mandarin
- Hanyu Pinyin: Shí Wàn Huǒ Jí
Yue: Cantonese
- Jyutping: Sap6 Maan6 Fo2 Gap1
- Directed by: Johnnie To
- Screenplay by: Yau Nai-hoi
- Produced by: Mona Fong
- Starring: Sean Lau; Alex Fong; Carman Lee
- Cinematography: Cheng Siu-Keung
- Edited by: Wong Wing-ming
- Music by: Raymond Wong
- Production company: Cosmopolitan Film Productions
- Distributed by: Shaw Brothers Studio
- Release date: 3 January 1997 (Hong Kong)
- Running time: 108 minutes
- Country: Hong Kong
- Language: Cantonese
- Box office: HK$20,730,867

Lifeline is a 1997 Hong Kong action disaster drama film directed by Johnnie To and starring Sean Lau, Alex Fong and Carman Lee.

== Plot ==
Yau Sui (Sean Lau) is a senior firefighter of the Tsz Wan Shan Fire Station who has an arrogant attitude because of his extensive experience. By chance, Sui meets Annie (Carman Lee), a doctor who becomes troublous after a recent breakup with her boyfriend. Sui consoles her and they begin a relationship. Meanwhile, Sui strikes a rivalry with the newly transferred senior officer of the fire station, Raymond Cheung (Alex Fong), often getting into disputes. Later, a big fire erupts in a weaving factory located in Tsuen Wan, where Sui, Raymond and their team members arrive to the scene, where the fire level rose to 5th alarm. Because of many hazardous objects present, an explosion occurs, releasing toxic gas. To deal with the dilemma, Sui and Raymond must put their rivalry aside and work together.

== Cast ==
- Sean Lau as Principal Fireman Yau Sui (有水)
- Alex Fong as Senior Station Officer Raymond Cheung (張文傑)
- Carman Lee as Dr. Annie Chan
- Damian Lau as Cheng Fu-wai (鄭富威), Chief Fire Officer
- Ruby Wong as Probationary Station Officer Lo Ka-wai (盧嘉慧)
- Raymond Wong Ho-yin as Fireman Wong Ho-yin (黃浩然)
- Chan Man-lei as Ho-yin's father
- Yuen Bun as injured Senior Station Officer Fong Ting-kwok
- Lam Suet as Arsonist
- Kenneth Chan as Annie's boyfriend
- Patrick Dunn as Madam Lo's husband
- Eileen Yeow as Janet, ex-wife of Raymond Cheung (張文傑)
- Annabelle Lau as Factory worker trapped in fire
- Yuen Ling-to as Factory manager
- Sin Kam-ching
- Lau man-yee
- Kwok Yee-kiu
- Cyrus Wong
- Lam Kwok-kit as Firefighter
- Lu Ching-ting as Firefighter
- Hung Wai-leung as Construction worker
- Chiu Chi-shing

== Reception ==
=== Critical ===
Beyond Hollywood gave the film a positive review praising the developed characters and the performances of Sean Lau and Alex Fong, while also noting its impressive fire stunts. LoveHKFilm gave the film a positive review and praises director Johnnie To's realism and sheer bravura storytelling. So Good Reviews also gave a positive review, praising the fire sequences and characters, but criticizes some of its melodramatic moments.

=== Box office ===
The film grossed HK$20,730,867 at the Hong Kong box office during its theatrical run from 3 January to 4 February 1997.

== Awards and nominations ==
Awards and nominations
Ceremony	Category	Recipient	Outcome
17th Hong Kong Film Awards	Best Film	Lifeline	Nominated
17th Hong Kong Film Awards	Best Director	Johnnie To	Nominated
17th Hong Kong Film Awards	Best New Performer	Ruby Wong	Nominated
17th Hong Kong Film Awards	Film Editing	Wong Wing-ming	Won
17th Hong Kong Film Awards	Best Action Choreography	Yuen Bun	Nominated
17th Hong Kong Film Awards	Best Sound Design	Lifeline	Won
4th Hong Kong Film Critics Society Awards	Film of Merit	Lifeline	Won
