= Michele Reis =

Hong Kong actress (born 1970)

- 李嘉欣
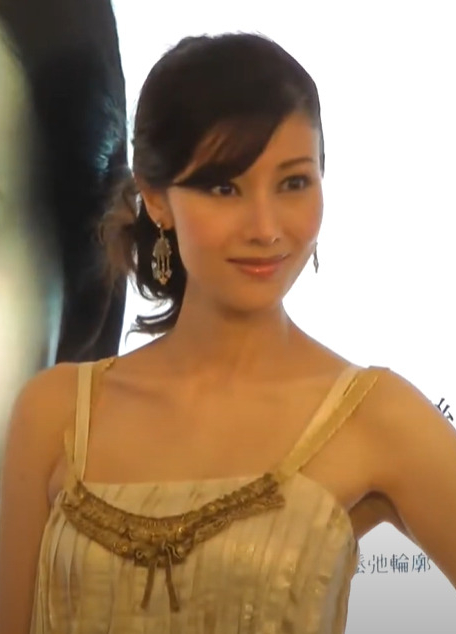
- Reis in 2017
- Born: Michele Monique Reis; 20 June 1970 (age 56); Portuguese Macau
- Citizenship: Chinese (Macau); Chinese (Hong Kong); Portugal
- Education: Maryknoll Convent School
- Occupations: Actress; model
- Years active: 1988–2003, 2009
- Known for: Swordsman II (1992), The Wicked City (1992), Fong Sai-yuk (1993), Fong Sai-yuk II (1993), The Legendary Ranger (1993), Fallen Angels (1995), Armageddon (1997), Flowers of Shanghai (1998), The City of Lost Souls (2000)
- Spouse: Julian Hui (m. 2008)
- Children: 1
- Modeling information
- Height: 1.71 m (5 ft 7 in)
- Hair color: Black
- Eye color: Black

Chinese name
- Chinese: 李嘉欣
Transcriptions
Standard Mandarin
- Hanyu Pinyin: Lǐ Jiāxīn
- Wade–Giles: Li^{3} Chia^{1}-hsin^{1}
Yue: Cantonese
- Jyutping: Lei5 Gaa1jan1

Michele Monique Reis (born 20 June 1970), often misspelled Michelle, is a Macau and Hong Kong former actress, model and beauty pageant titleholder. In 1988, she won the Miss Chinese International Pageant and Miss Hong Kong beauty pageants. Afterwards, she became a prominent actress in 1990s Hong Kong, often appearing in introspective and independent fare rather than mainstream releases.

Reis often played dynamic characters, with a significant number of her roles centering around characters deemed more "difficult" to portray in Hong Kong cinema, such as prostitutes, femme fatales, and professional killers. Known for her youthful beauty and often deemed "one of the most beautiful women in Asia", Reis has continued to remain in the public eye long after her film career subsided in the early 2000s. Outside of the Chinese-speaking world, she is most famous for her role as the Hitman's Assistant in Fallen Angels (1995), which brought her critical acclaim internationally, as well as status as a cult film character and saw her nominated for “Best Actress" at the 1996 Golden Bauhinia Awards.

== Early life ==
Reis was born in Macau, then a Portuguese colony, on 20 June 1970 as Michele Monique Reis. She did not acquire her Chinese name, Lee Ka Yan or Li Jiaxin (李嘉欣), until after elementary school. She is of mixed ancestry; her father, Francis Reis, was a Hong Kong-born ethnically Portuguese Macanese, and her mother, Wu Guofang (Chinese: 吴国芳), is Chinese and was raised in Shanghai before moving to British Hong Kong after World War II. Reis also has an older sister, born in August 1962, known as "Yuet Chi" (Joanna Francisca Reis or Li Jiaming; 李嘉明).

Her father, a member of the Hong Kong Volunteers, was captured by the Japanese when defending Hong Kong in 1941 during World War II and was imprisoned by the Imperial Japanese Army in the Sham Shui Po Barracks for two years. Francis was reportedly popular and well-liked by the other prisoners. Still, because of his height, he was sent to work in coal mines in Sendai, Japan, until Japan's surrender. After the liberation of Hong Kong in 1945, he returned to Hong Kong, married Michele's mother, and entered a business career.

In 1973, a modeling scout discovered Reis, and she was subsequently shot in a one-time baby advertisement.

Reis recalls her childhood as an unhappy one. She recalls her childhood being devoid of toys or new clothes and dominated by "her mother's tears and parents' endless bickering". Her father became more absent, resulting in Reis being raised primarily by her mother. Francis Reis was unsuccessful in his career, "achieving nothing", resulting in the family living in poverty. Wu Guofang, Reis' mother, worked two jobs a day to provide for the family. The family lived in a tin roof house, which they built themselves and was typical of Hong Kong's impoverished, and then lived in the highly dense and impoverished Chungking Mansions. Conditions at the tin roof house were very poor, with summers being extremely hot and rain easily dripping through cracks in their roof.

In 1982, when she was 12, Reis filmed a second advertisement.

At 14, she began part-time studies as a student, which her mother emphasised, completing these studies by modelling part-time. By the time she entered the 1988 Miss Hong Kong Pageant, she had already appeared in more than 70 advertisements. During her studies, modelling scouts offered her casting and commercial film opportunities, but Reis declined as she wanted to be a flight attendant. Reis attended Maryknoll Convent School and matriculated from St. Paul's Secondary School throughout her studies. At Maryknoll Convent School, she received excellent grades, with 2A (English, Bible) results and ranking 7B in the five-year secondary education graduation exam.

Many years after Reis' father abandoned the family and as Reis began to become well-known in Hong Kong, he tried to contact Reis by phone, asking for money. Despite her worries about his deteriorating health, she had no intention of reconnecting. Years later, Reis recalled the phone call, which she found hurtful. Reis’ father died at the Prince of Wales Hospital in Hong Kong on 22 August 1995 after fighting a blood disorder for eight months. She attended his funeral.

== Career ==
=== Beauty queen career and early actress career (1988–1993) ===
In 1988, after encouragement from others, Reis auditioned for the 1988 Miss Hong Kong Pageant. She was predicted to win the "Best Photogenic Award", which gave Reis the self-confidence to continue on this career path. However, Sheila Chin won the "Best Photogenic Award" instead. She reportedly cried after leaving the stage. However, her mother's words reminded Reis that the road to success was difficult and that there would be many setbacks in the future on this career path, which proved highly influential and inspirational to Reis, encouraging her to press ahead with the Miss Hong Kong Pageant. The competition between Reis and Sheila Chin was tense in the pageant and was "neck-to-neck". Reis won the pageant, becoming Miss Hong Kong 1988 at the age of 18 and winning the contest's "Miss International Goodwill" title. While both women would soon receive entertainment careers, with both taking a direction towards acting, Reis would, by the mid-1990s, ultimately become a more acclaimed celebrity than Chin, with distinctive film roles. Later that year, in late 1988, Reis would also become the first Miss Chinese International and was awarded the "Best Photogenic Award". Following her Miss Chinese International crowning, she participated in the Miss World 1988 pageant in London, where she promoted the image of Hong Kong. Continuing her newfound status as an acclaimed beauty queen, Reis was then supposed to compete in the Miss Universe 1989 pageant but withdrew due to health problems, citing "personal reasons".

Reis would later reveal in 1998 that her beauty queen career proved to be a difficult time for her, stating: “The Miss Hong Kong time was very confusing for me. I wouldn’t have the courage to do it again.” After spending a year as the "Miss International Goodwill" Ambassador, a title she received from the Miss Hong Kong 1988 pageant, Reis later remarked that she "wasn’t sure what I would do after it." As is customary for many Miss Hong Kong winners, Reis would receive a career offer from TVB – with Mona Fong, the Deputy chairman and general manager of TVB, personally stepping forward and trying her best to persuade Reis to sign a contract. Fong offered Reis very favourable conditions, such as not pushing Reis to star in the TV station's low budget series, which is what usually happens with new, young faces in TVB, as well as offering Reis more beyond a normal monthly salary. As such, Reis soon appeared in a 5-episode TVB drama series called “I Do I Do” (花月佳期), which aired in late March 1989. While the drama is fairly unremarkable, it marked the first acting role of Reis, who had had no formal acting training when she was offered a contract by TVB, and later remarked that filming the series "seemed like the right thing to do." In 1990, having first worked in commercials, appearing in music videos and then on TVB television episodes, Reis made her formal entry into showbiz with her first film roles such as Declaration Of Help (1990) – her film debut – and although a newcomer to films, played a role such as the "rebel sister" Yuet Chi / Moon in her second film, A Chinese Ghost Story Part II (1990). That year, she would also go on to star in comedies like No Risk, No Gain (1990), starring as Winnie, and as a streetwise tough beauty in Perfect Girls (1990). Her next films, in the years 1990–1993 would mostly be comedies, and she would often play roles dependent on her beauty. As such, she would to some degree cultivate an idol image, starring in popular films such as The Banquet (1991), Royal Tramp II (1992), and replacing Cecilia Yip in starring as the tomboyish disciple Kiddo in Swordsman II (1992) – starring alongside her favourite actress Brigitte Lin. Reis would also star in A Kid from Tibet (1992). However, Reis also starred in some roles in this early part of her acting career that would distinctly represent her acting style, and bring her out as an actress. These included starring as "Windy" in the anime-inspired, science-fiction future noir The Wicked City (1992), where her full-mouthed looks were deemed just right for the anime-inspired film, and her performance as an actress was brought out significantly in a way previously not before. Telling a story of conflicts and relationship between demon-like creatures and humans in 1990s Hong Kong, the film was a big success, being one of the most popular Tsui Hark productions in the USA and Europe, and still playing in festivals and midnight screenings around the USA and Europe. Reis would also dominate the film's promotional material.

=== Actress breakthrough (1993–1995) ===
By the dawn of the mid-1990s however, most of Reis’ film roles, with the exception of a few notable, acclaimed roles, had been relatively undemanding, being mainly known for her minor girl-next-door, "nice girl" roles, and she was often only used for simply window dressing, a common phenomenon amongst good-looking talents in Hong Kong's entertainment industry. Ambitious and wishing to attempt further, more elaborate roles with greater complexity, such as successful women, women with sex appeal, editresses or "mad women", Reis expanded the scope of her acting career significantly from 1993. Starring in Jet Li’s movie The Legend of Fong Sai Yuk (1993), she starred as the beautiful Ting-Ting. The film was a box office hit and Reis then starred in its sequel released later that year, Fong Sai-Yuk II (1993). Moving into television, Reis began to increase the complexity of her roles as she so desired, starring as the beautiful and deceptive top agent of a doomsday cult in the cross-genre TVB drama The Legendary Ranger (1993) alongside her good friend Leon Lai. The drama's eclectic setting and merger of wuxia, science fiction and fantasy genres, as well as its visual aesthetic was considered at the time groundbreaking in Hong Kong, and the demented mixture of beauty and darkness in the acting material Reis worked with cemented her signature acting style. In The Black Morning Glory (1993), Reis was to establish her acting style a step further – playing a complex dual-role as a professional killer employed by the Japanese yakuza. The film also dealt into the mental complexity of Reis’ character, with a drama-based storyline that sees her character fend off the police and yakuza while also attempting to reconcile with her own turmoil after she realises who she has killed. The film would then go on to serve as premise for Reis starring in The Other Side of the Sea (1994), where Reis would again portray a cold-blooded professional killer who must reckon with going on the run and betrayal after becoming disillusioned with a life of killing.

By 1995, Reis would star again alongside Leon Lai; this time in Wong Kar-wai’s neo-noir crime thriller Fallen Angels (1995), playing a sexually frustrated, jealous, cold-blooded hitman's assistant. Reis’ character was a notable departure from her earlier roles, allowing herself to be filmed at fisheye lens angles, in grungy colours and with an appearance that was glamorously dressed, stylish, and decidedly grunge, an appearance that would become emblematic of Reis’ style, but at times also dishevelled in contrast to the polished appearance of her Miss Hong Kong days. Reis’ character was described as a "chain-smoking, quivering, obsessive mess who faxes kill-plans and masturbates in PVC fetish dresses", and was also interpreted as a ironic depiction of supermodel glamour or MTV music videos. Fully declaring herself as an actress, and breaking away completely from any kind of innocent or clean-cut image in a way that likely shocked many of her fans, Reis received critical acclaim for her portrayal of the role and immediately established herself as an A-list actress, becoming amongst Hong Kong's most famous actresses. Fallen Angels would go on to become a cult classic of the "Golden Age" of Hong Kong cinema, and Reis’ film character would also become a cult film character and a grunge icon – a reputation Reis has continued to have to this day. The role would also establish Reis as having fame beyond the Chinese-speaking world, becoming her most well-known role outside of the Chinese-speaking world. The role has often been called as the “bravest film choice" in Reis’ film career, marking a moment where she began to build a reputation for starring in introspective and high-quality movies, and by far her most iconic role – it has also been called her "very best performance".

=== Continued film and modelling success (1995-early 2000s) ===
After the success of Fallen Angels, Reis’ film output began to decrease, with only 8 films over the next 5 years, representing how she was only willing to only star in higher-quality movies with more challenging film roles, though she continued to pick up large success in her modelling work. In 1996, she modelled for cinematographer Christopher Doyle’s art book Angel Talk, which built on her grunge image. That same year, she starred as Laura in July 13th (1996), a horror film about mental problems, suicide, and sleepless pressure in the chaos of Hong Kong city life. In 1997, Reis starred in the action sci-fi mystery thriller Armageddon (1997) as Adele, Andy Lau’s character's dead fiancé. The film was visually and thematically a departure from many other works in Hong Kong cinema at the time, and she also starred in Young And Dangerous IV (1997), the fourth film in the hugely-popular Young and Dangerous series of films. In 1998, Reis starred as the ambitious prostitute Emerald in the arthouse film Flowers of Shanghai. The role is Reis’ personal favourite of all her acting roles and she was the only member of the cast to fluently speak Shanghainese. Afterwards, she starred in the Japanese action film The City of Lost Souls in 2000, her last major film role. During the late 1990s, Reis’ career was also taking her abroad for further success – Reis was so popular in Japan that she was able to pick up "millions" from a day's work of working in Tokyo, and she was also doing a lot of advertising work in Los Angeles.

Around the beginning of the 2000s, Reis began to withdraw from acting to focus on family and charity businesses whilst making occasional public appearances. Her last role to date was 2009's Bodyguards and Assassins.

On 25 December 2021, Reis made an appearance as a guest/main judge on HK Television Entertainment's fourth season of the talent variety show King Maker (Chinese: 全民造星IV), sparking internet discussion and hype.

== Personal life ==
Reis is fluent in seven languages - Cantonese, Mandarin, Shanghainese, English, Portuguese, Japanese, and Italian - and has used several of these languages in her films, such as Shanghainese in Flowers of Shanghai (1998) and Japanese in The City of Lost Souls (2000). She is Catholic.

On 23 November 2008, following a public two-year courtship, Reis married business tycoon Julian Hui, son of real-estate billionaire Hui Sai Fun (1921–2018). Their son Jayden Max Hui was born on 8 February 2011. His initials are derived from the first initials, "J" and "M", of his parents' names.

In 2007, a viral audio of Reis and business tycoon Joseph Lau leaked onto the internet caused controversy, in which Reis and Lau had a heated argument regarding actresses he had signed, including Ada Choi and Catherine Hung. Reis' use of profanity directed at Lau led netizens to imply the two to be in a relationship and being able to swear profusely behind his wife's back during that time, although the quality and time indicated that the audio was recorded in the 1990s. Reis' famous line "I'm really gonna congratulate you/I give my congratulations!" (Chinese: 「我真係恭喜你呀！」) is often used by people nowadays as a sarcastic manner online or in real life.

On 15 January 2022, Reis was rushed to ICU after a near death experience due to breathing complications.

== Partial filmography ==
Sources:

- No Risk, No Gain (1990) – Winnie
- A Chinese Ghost Story Part II (1990) – Yuet Chi / Moon
- Perfect Girls (1990) – Lo Hsaio-Hsiao
- Qiang qian xiong di zhi zei yu shi da e (1990)
- Doctor's Heart (1990) – Anita Yeung
- Party of a Wealthy Family (1991) – Kar-Yan Li
- A Kid from Tibet (1991) – Chiu Seng-Neng
- Swordsman II (1992) – Kiddo
- Casino Tycoon II (1992) – Ti Yun
- Royal Tramp II (1992) – Li Ming-ke / A-ke
- Zen of Sword (1992) – Princess Choi Siu-Ling
- The Wicked City (1992) – Wan-Gei
- Fong Sai Yuk (1993) – Ting Ting
- The Sword of Many Loves (1993) – Ching Ling
- The Black Morning Glory (1993) – Michelle Lam Man-Ting / Fan Lin
- Fong Sai Yuk II (1993) – Ting Ting
- Drunken Master III (1994) – Sum Yu
- The Other Side of the Sea (1994) – Yip Man-Sau
- Fallen Angels (1995) – The Killer's Agent
- 100 Ways to Kill Yourself (1996) – Laura
- Heaven Earth Great Ambition (1997) – Adele
- Young and Dangerous 4 (1997) – Lee Yan-Kin
- Flowers of Shanghai (1998) – Emerald
- Prince Charming (1999) – 'Ice' Poa
- Round About Midnight (1999) – Linda
- The Island Tales (2000) – Sharon
- When I Fall in Love... with Both (2000) – Cecilia / Xixi (Chinese pinyin transliteration)
- The City of Strangers (2000) – Jackie Fong
- Healing Hearts (2000) – Kei
- Bakery Amour (2001) – Lok To
- Every Dog Has His Date (2001) – Sharon Lee
- Beauty and the Breast (2002) – Yuki
- The Irresistible Piggies (2002) – Mo
- Miss Du Shi Niang (2003) – Lady Ten
- Bodyguards and Assassins (2009) – Prince Lau's lover (final film role)

== Name as a wordplay ==
In mainland China in 2010, it was a popular meme for several Chinese white-collar workers to display images of Michele Reis at the office to subtly ask for a raise in salary because her Chinese name Jiāxīn (嘉欣) is an exact homophone of 加薪 ("pay raise") in Mandarin Chinese, and is a near-homophone in Cantonese language (ga1yan1/ga1san1).

== Awards and nominations ==
Year	Award	Category	Nominated work	Result	Ref.
1986	16th Miss Hong Kong Pageant	Miss Hong Kong	—N/a	Won	
1986	1st Miss Chinese International Pageant	Miss Chinese International	—N/a	Won	
1996	Golden Bauhinia Awards	Best Actress	Fallen Angels	Nominated	

== See also ==
- Cinema of Hong Kong
- Macanese people

== Notes ==
Awards and achievements
Preceded by None	Miss Chinese International; 1988	Succeeded by (Australia) Kit Wong
