= Eighteen Springs (film) =

- Film poster
- Traditional Chinese: 半生緣
- Simplified Chinese: 半生缘
- Hanyu Pinyin: Bànshēng Yuán
- Directed by: Ann Hui
- Written by: John Chan Kin-chung; Eileen Chang (novel)
- Produced by: Ann Hui; Jimmy Wang Yu
- Starring: Jacklyn Wu; Leon Lai; Anita Mui; Huang Lei; Ge You
- Cinematography: Mark Lee Ping-bin
- Edited by: Wong Yee-Shun; Poon Hung
- Music by: Daniel Ye Xiaogang
- Release date: 1997
- Running time: 126 minutes
- Countries: Hong Kong; China
- Language: Mandarin

Eighteen Springs (simplified Chinese: 半生缘; traditional Chinese: 半生緣; pinyin: Bànshēng Yuán) is a 1997 romantic drama directed by Ann Hui and starring Jacklyn Wu, Leon Lai, Anita Mui, Huang Lei and Ge You. It is a China-Hong Kong co-production, based on the novel of the same name by Eileen Chang.

The film depicts the ill-fated romance between two Chinese lovers in Shanghai and Nanjing during the 1930s and 1940s, which destined them to be apart for more than a decade. The film marked the second time Hui directed an Eileen Chang adaptation (the first was 1984’s Love in a Fallen City).

== Title ==
The novel was originally serialized in Shanghai’s Yibao (亦报) in 1950–1951. Chang published a revised version in 1969 in Taiwan, shortening the length of the lovers’ separation from 18 to 14 years and changing the title from 十八春 (Eighteen Springs) to 半生緣 (The yuan (affinity) of half a lifetime). Although the film's English title retains the original Chinese title, the Chinese title uses the revised title of the novel.

== Plot ==
Gu Manzhen (Jacklyn Wu) is an educated girl, working in a Shanghai factory as a clerical assistant. Her elder sister Manlu (Anita Mui), who works as a nightclub hostess, supports her family. At the factory Manzhen meets two former male classmates, Xu Shuhui (Huang Lei) and Shen Shijun (Leon Lai), and the three become firm friends. Manzhen falls in love with the introverted Shijun, who hails from a wealthy family in Nanjing and is working in Shanghai because he does not want to inherit his father’s merchandising business.

Unable to marry the man she loves, Manlu decides to marry wealthy, decadent playboy Zhu Hongcai (Ge You). Meanwhile, Manzhen and Shijun encounter obstacles to their love. Shijun’s family (believing Manzhen’s sister works at a sordid occupation) opposes their relationship and tries to match him with a cousin, Shi Cuizhi (Annie Wu). Manzhen quarrels with Shijun, and the two part unhappily.

Manlu is unable to bear children. To keep her husband, she arranges for Manzhen—visiting overnight—to be locked in their mansion and raped by Zhu (who is attracted to Manzhen). Manzhen becomes pregnant and is kept prisoner in Zhu’s mansion, unable to contact Shijun. When Shijun arrives to see Manzhen, Manlu sends him away thinking that Manzhen has rejected his love because of their social differences.

Manzhen escapes from the hospital after giving birth to Zhu’s son, and becomes a schoolteacher in another town. By the time she writes to Shijun, he has married Cuizhi. Cuizhi and her mother-in-law burn Manzhen's letters to Shijun.

Many years later, a desperately ill Manlu tracks down Manzhen to ask her forgiveness. Before she dies, she returns Manzhen's biological son (fathered by Zhu) in the hope that Manzhen will raise him. Manzhen still hates Zhu (who is remorseful for the rape), but decides to stay with him for the sake of their son.

Fourteen years after their parting, Manzhen and Shijun meet again by chance at their favorite restaurant in Shanghai. The two catch up on each other's lives and realize hopelessly that no matter how much they still love each other, because of their other obligations they can never be together again.

The film then flashes back to Shijun's search for Manzhen's missing red glove, which was when their romance began.

== Cast ==
- Jacklyn Wu as Gu Manzhen (顾曼桢)
- Leon Lai as Shen Shijun (沈世钧)
- Anita Mui as Gu Manlu (顾曼璐)
- Ge You as Zhu Hongcai (祝鸿才)
- Annie Wu as Shi Cuizhi (石翠芝)
- Huang Lei as Xu Shuhui (许叔惠)
- Wang Zhiwen as Zhang Yujin (张豫瑾)
- Liu Changwei as Fang Yipeng (方一鹏)

== Critical reception ==
Eighteen Springs was well received in Hong Kong. The film won Anita Mui the Best Supporting Actress award at the 17th Hong Kong Film Awards. Jacklyn Wu was nominated for Best Actress for her role as Manzhen.

The film was also fairly well received (although distributed less) in the West. Time Out magazine compared Eighteen Springs's "retrospective voiceovers" to Wong Kar-wai’s, calling it "visually lush and beautifully layered" and likening it to "a lyrical, poignant souvenir". Critics singled out Jacklyn Wu's portrayal of Manzhen for praise. In a comprehensive review, Shelly Kraicer compared Lai's performance to Wu’s and found him wanting:

Leon Lai fills space handsomely, but in his scenes with her, he is negative energy: you can almost see how hard Wu is working, how much energy she has to put out to make the scenes work (although they do).

He praised Wu:

Wu doesn't choose an easier, self-consciously melodramatic style for her portrayal of Shujun (sic). Anita Mui, as Shujun's older sister, shows both the power and limitations of this option: she strikes an unforgettable set of gorgeously sinister poses, which seem expressly designed for the camera. But one is always aware that one is watching Anita Mui, larger-than-life, dazzling us on the screen.

Wu Chien-lien takes an opposite, far more difficult approach. Against the expectations imposed by the melodrama genre, she builds a character out of small, lightly sketched, delicately nuanced moments. Each in itself only hints at a full emotional world that lies beneath. But as they accumulate, as Wu's character slowly builds, the parts add up to a rich and very moving whole. Her approach neatly parallels what the film teaches about how character is formed: how this woman's personality is constructed out of various pieces, events, and reactions, out of a combination of resistances to and defeats by circumstance (or 'fate', in the language of the film). When Wu shows Manjing's [sic] shock, despair, and determination to survive what's thrown at her, all of which play briefly across her face as she is told that Shujun [sic]) has married someone else, we're witnessing great acting; that illuminates character, resonates with the film's structure, and at the same time subverts its overtly melodramatic form.

Other reviews of Eighteen Springs focused on Hui’s extensive use of voiceovers.

== Awards ==
Eighteen Springs won Anita Mui a Best Supporting Actress award at the 17th Hong Kong Film Awards. It was nominated in six other categories: `

- Best Actress (Jacklyn Wu)
- Best Cinematography (Lee Ping-Bin)
- Best Art Direction (Tsui Fung-Nyn, Wong Yan-Kwai)
- Best Costume Design (Miu Gwan-Git)
- Best Original Score (Yip Siu-Gong)
- Best Original Song ("Eighteen Springs", performed by Leon Lai)

Wu received the Best Actress award at the fourth annual Hong Kong Film Critics Society Awards for her role in the film.
