= Made in Hong Kong (film) =

1997 Hong Kong film by Fruit Chan

- Theatrical release poster
- Traditional Chinese: 香港製造
- Simplified Chinese: 香港制造
- Literal meaning: Hong Kong manufacture
- Hanyu Pinyin: Xiānggǎng zhìzào
- Jyutping: Hoeng1 Gong2 zai3 zou6
- Directed by: Fruit Chan
- Written by: Fruit Chan
- Produced by: Andy Lau; Doris Yang Ziming
- Starring: Sam Lee; Yim Hui-Chi; Wenders Li; Tam Ka-Chuen
- Cinematography: Lam Wah-Chuen; O Sing-Pui
- Edited by: Fruit Chan
- Music by: Lam Wah-Chuen
- Production companies: Nicetop Independent Ltd. Teamwork Motion Pictures
- Release date: 9 October 1997
- Running time: 108 minutes
- Country: Hong Kong
- Language: Cantonese
- Box office: HK$1,917,330

Made in Hong Kong (Chinese: 香港製造) is a 1997 Hong Kong drama film written, directed and edited by Fruit Chan, produced by Andy Lau, and starring Sam Lee, Yim Hui-Chi, Wenders Li, and Tam Ka-Chuen. At the 17th Hong Kong Film Awards, it won three out of five awards it was nominated for: Best Film, Best Director, and Best New Performer (Lee). The film was selected as the Hong Kong entry for the Best Foreign Language Film at the 71st Academy Awards, but was not accepted as a nominee. It was selected as one of the Best 100 Chinese Motion Pictures in 2005 by Hong Kong Film Awards.

== Plot ==
Autumn Moon is a secondary school drop-out whose father has abandoned his family for his mistress. Filled with resentment, Moon wants to attack his father, but his mother persuades him not to. He works with his friend Sylvester, who is mentally disabled, as a debt collector for a triad member, Cheung Siu-Wing. Sylvester is frequently bullied and Moon regularly defends him by fighting those who mistreat him. One day, Sylvester finds two bloodstained letters. They are the suicide notes left by Susan, addressed separately to her parents and to a male teacher with whom she had become emotionally involved before taking her own life.

While collecting debts for Siu-Wing, Moon meets Ping, the daughter of Mrs. Lam, one of the debtors. Ping lives with her mother; the debts were accumulated by her absentee father. After reading Susan's suicide note, Moon is haunted by recurring nightmares of her death, which even cause nocturnal emissions. Knowing that she has little time left to live because of her kidney disease, Ping took the initiative to befriend Moon. Meanwhile, Sylvester often experiences nosebleeds whenever he encounters Ping and appears unusually sensitive to the scent of her illness. The three visit Susan's school to deliver one of the suicide notes to the teacher, but he tears it up without reading it. They later visit Susan's home, where they see her memorial portrait through a window. Deeply moved, Ping finally tells Moon that she is terminally ill. He gradually falls in love with her and becomes determined to earn enough money to pay for her treatment.

Moon's friend Keung works as a driver. Keung's girlfriend, Ms. Lee, is a social worker. Through her, Moon and others sign organ donor consent forms. One day, a man called Fat Chan arrives to collect Ping's family's debt. Moon wards off Fat Chan's attempts to collect money from Mrs. Lam who does not approve of their relationship. Desperate for money, Moon asks Siu-Wing to lend him HK$20,000. Siu-Wing offers him work selling drugs instead, but Moon refuses. He later steals money from his own mother, who discovers the theft, beats him, and scolds him for refusing to find honest work. With Keung's help, Moon eventually finds employment at a knife shop. Meanwhile, Sylvester is cornered in a restroom and beaten by three students. Moon rescues him, punishes the attackers, then personally washes Sylvester's wounds and helps stop the bleeding.

One day, Moon's mother leaves home, leaving behind a farewell letter. Furious, he takes a knife and sets out to confront his father. While using a public restroom, however, he witnesses a student viciously chopping off his own father's hand with a knife. Horrified by the gruesome scene and the man's screams, Moon abandons his plan for revenge. During Ping's hospitalization, Moon and Sylvester regularly visit her. At one point, the three travel to a cemetery searching for Susan's grave and loudly call out her name. After Ping is discharged, Moon visits her home intending to give her money he has obtained from Siu-Wing, only to discover that Fat Chan has beaten Ping's mother. Enraged, he gathers several companions to hunt Fat Chan down, but they fail to find him.

Moon later takes an assassination contact from Siu-Wing, but is too nervous to go through with it. Sometime later, Moon is stabbed repeatedly outside his apartment by a young thug sent by Fat Chan. Moon falls into a coma though eventually makes a full recovery. Upon awakening, he finds that Sylvester has been killed by Siu-Wing after a failed drug-trafficking job and Ping has succumbed to her illness.

Out of hope, Moon finally delivers Susan's remaining suicide note to her parents. He takes revenge by killing Siu-Wing and Fat Chan before committing suicide by Ping's gravestone.

== Cast and roles ==
- Sam Lee - To Chung-Chau, "Moon"
- Neiky Yim Hui-Chi - Lam Yuk-Ping, "Ping"
- Wenders Li - Ah-Lung, "Sylvester" (credited as Wenbers Li Tung-Chuen)
- Amy Tam Ka-Chuen - Hui Bo San, "Susan"
- Carol Lam Kit-Fong - Mrs. Lam, Ping's mother
- Doris Chow Yan-Wah - Mrs. To, Moon's mother
- Siu Chung - Ms. Lee, social worker
- Chan Tat-Yee - Fat Chan
- Wu Wai-Chung - Keung
- Sang Chan - "Big Brother", Cheung Siu-Wing
- Kelvin Chung - Doctor
- Ah Ting - Moon's father
- Jessica - Moon's father's current wife
- Ah Wai - Assassin on skateboard
- Ho B-Chai - Male student

== Production ==
Fruit Chan has made 2 films in mainstream studios but was dissatisfied. As Chan explained in an interview, he decided to make an independent film, and through his former connections, secured financial backing of Andy Lau's production company. It used minimal crew of seven with no more than five in any working day at work. The total production budget was 1/2 million Hong Kong dollars.

Much of the film is set in public housing estates, which Chan considered to be "a very Hong Kong thing" due to the high population density of the territory. Though the film is sometimes regarded as a response to the 1997 Hong Kong handover, Chan feels that Made in Hong Kong can also be viewed as a character-driven drama that reflects the lifestyle of many young Hong Kong people at the time.

The film was made using leftover film reels and therefore had very low production costs, even for an independent movie.

== Reception ==
=== Critical response ===
BBC Four said the film is "impressively shot" and "boasts convincing performances". Slant Magazine's Pat Brown gives the film 2.5 stars out of 4, stating "Fruit Chan's quirky, gangster-adjacent flick, so infused with washed-out and blue-filtered imagery, presents a portrait of Hong Kong that bears more than a passing resemblance to Wong Kar-wai and Christopher Doyle's early collaborations."

On the review aggregator website Rotten Tomatoes, 100% of 11 critics' reviews are positive, with an average rating of 7.4/10.

=== Accolades ===
Award	Category	Recipient(s)	Result
2nd Busan International Film Festival	FIPRESCI Award	Made in Hong Kong	Won
2nd Busan International Film Festival	New Currents Award	Made in Hong Kong	Nominated
3rd Golden Bauhinia Awards	Best Film	Made in Hong Kong	Won
3rd Golden Bauhinia Awards	Best Director	Fruit Chan	Won
3rd Golden Bauhinia Awards	Best Screenplay	Fruit Chan	Nominated
34th Golden Horse Awards	Best Feature Film	Made in Hong Kong	Nominated
34th Golden Horse Awards	Best Director	Fruit Chan	Won
34th Golden Horse Awards	Best Original Screenplay	Fruit Chan	Won
34th Golden Horse Awards	Best Film Editing	Fruit Chan	Nominated
34th Golden Horse Awards	Best Leading Actor	Sam Lee	Nominated
17th Hong Kong Film Awards	Best Film	Made in Hong Kong	Won
17th Hong Kong Film Awards	Best Director	Fruit Chan	Won
17th Hong Kong Film Awards	Best Screenplay	Fruit Chan	Nominated
17th Hong Kong Film Awards	Best New Performer	Sam Lee	Won
17th Hong Kong Film Awards	Best Film Editing	Fruit Chan	Nominated
4th Hong Kong Film Critics Society Award	Best Film	Made in Hong Kong	Nominated
4th Hong Kong Film Critics Society Award	Best Director	Fruit Chan	Won
4th Hong Kong Film Critics Society Award	Best Screenplay	Fruit Chan	Nominated
4th Hong Kong Film Critics Society Award	Best Actor	Sam Lee	Nominated
4th Hong Kong Film Critics Society Award	Films of Merit	Made in Hong Kong	Won
50th Locarno Film Festival	Europa Cinemas Label	Made in Hong Kong	Won
19th Three Continents Festival	Golden Montgolfière	Made in Hong Kong	Won
16th Vancouver International Film Festival	Dragons and Tigers Award	Made in Hong Kong	Nominated

== Home media ==
The film was released in blu-ray by Kino Lorber.

== See also ==
- List of submissions to the 71st Academy Awards for Best Foreign Language Film
- List of Hong Kong submissions for the Academy Award for Best Foreign Language Film
