= Full Alert (film) =

1997 Hong Kong film by Ringo Lam

- Hong Kong film poster for Full Alert
- Chinese: 高度戒備
- Hanyu Pinyin: Gāodù Jièbèi
- Jyutping: Gou1dou6 Gaai3bei6
- Directed by: Ringo Lam
- Screenplay by: Lau Wing-kin; Ringo Lam
- Story by: Ringo Lam
- Produced by: Li Kuo-hsing
- Starring: Lau Ching-wan; Francis Ng; Jack Kao; Amanda Lee
- Cinematography: Ardy Lam
- Edited by: Marco Mak; Angie Lam
- Music by: Peter Kam
- Production company: Brilliant Idea Group Ltd.
- Release date: 18 July 1997
- Running time: 98 minutes
- Country: Hong Kong
- Language: Cantonese
- Budget: HK$13,000,000
- Box office: HK$14,691,880

Full Alert is a 1997 Hong Kong action film directed and co-written by Ringo Lam. The film's plot is set in 1997 when cops find a corpse and bomb chemicals, Inspector Pao (Lau Ching-wan) arrests suspect Mak Kwan (Francis Ng) hoping that his girlfriend will lead them to his Taiwanese gang, but Mak makes an escape and the girlfriend makes off for Macao. Pao then figures that the gang will go for the $230 million at the Hong Kong Jockey club while Mak plans his escape from prison.

Full Alert was shown at both the Rotterdam Film Festival and Berlin International Film Festival in 1997. It was nominated for five awards at the 17th Hong Kong Film Awards.

== Plot ==
Mak Kwan (Francis Ng) is an expert in bombs and a highly wanted criminal. After killing off his partner, he is arrested by police officer Pao Wai Hung (Sean Lau), who is in deep guilt due to an accidental killing. Kwan's girlfriend/conspirator, Chung Lai-hung (Amanda Lee) informs the head of the gang that Mak is being held by the police. Since Taiwanese mafia leader Zang (Jack Kao) fears that Mak will reveal their plans, he nevertheless makes a promise to rescue Mak with his underlings and Chan Wah (Raymond Cho), Mak's cousin and another criminal. Knowing the mafia leader's plan, Pao prepares to takedown Mak once more. Although the mafia leader cannot get to Mak, they manage to kill Pao's subordinate Yung (Yung Kam-cheong).

Pao and his subordinate Bill (Chin Kar-lok) are upset over Yung's death and swear to get revenge, and the police force sets off a high alert for the criminals. Chan Wah is then killed by the Zang's men, whose body is placed in a building's radiator in order to frame Pao. Meanwhile, Kwan escapes from prison with the assistance of a fellow prisoner. As he grows to understand Kwan's personality, Pao waits for the latter at the Hong Kong Jockey Club. Kwan reacts by tying up Pao's family, including his wife (Monica Chan). When Mak sneaks into the Jockey Club and takes the money, Zang arrives to kill him so that he can take the whole portion of the money for himself. Betrayed, Mak kills Zang. Mak takes the money with Lai-hung and escape, but are followed by Pao. As they engage at a shootout with each other, Pao shoots Lai-hung. Realizing he cannot handle her death, Mak shoots himself.

== Cast ==
- Sean Lau as HKPF Senior Inspector Pao Wai-hung
- Francis Ng as Mak Kwan, a former carpenter turned bomb expert and wanted criminal
- Amanda Lee as Chung Lai-hung, Kwan's girlfriend and partner in crime
- Jack Kao as Zang/Gentleman, a Taiwanese mafia leader who is working with Kwan on behalf of robbing money
- Monica Chan as Pao's wife
- Chin Ka Lok as Bill, Pao's subordinate
- Yung Kam-cheong as Yung, Pao's subordinate
- Raymond Cho as Chan Wah, Mak's cousin and his subordinate
- Emily Kwan Po-wai as Bo, Pao's subordinate
- Lee Siu-kei as a prisoner who helps Kwan escape (cameo)
- Ng Chi Hung as a police informant who gives information to Chung (cameo)
- Tsang Wai-ming as the head of the Hong Kong Jockey Club
- Cheng Siu-fung as the head sergeant of transportation
- Fok Wing-fu as Sang, Zang's subordinate and driver

== Production ==
In 1997, video distributor Mei Ah started its own film production company, Brilliant Idea Group (BIG) which was headed by Joe Ma. The companies first film was Ringo Lam's Full Alert.

In Hong Kong, few film productions have the budget to build sets leading to most scenes being shot on location. For Full Alert, Ringo Lam filmed a pursuit scene in Hong Kong during five days of traffic without blocking roads or obtaining official permission which involved filming cars passing trams and flipping over in the streets.

== Release ==
Full Alert was released in Hong Kong on 18 July 1997 and earned a total of HK$14,691,880 in the box office. In 1997, the film was shown at the Rotterdam Film Festival and the Berlin International Film Festival.

The Region 2 DVD for Full Alert was released on 17 July 2000. It included a Ringo Lam filmography and the film's theatrical trailer. The BBC referred to DVD's image quality as more poor than average mainstream DVDs but has suffered less print damage than other Hong Kong films.

== Reception ==
In Hong Kong, the film received five nominations at the 17th Hong Kong Film Awards for Best Film, Best Director, Best Actor (Lau Ching-wan), Best Editing (Marco Mak and Angie Lam), and Best sound. At the 4th Hong Kong Film Critics Society Awards, Full Alert won the award for best film and best actor (Lau Ching-wan).

Outside of Hong Kong, Neil Strauss praised the film in The New York Times, calling it "one of the best new Hong Kong cop stories (rivaled only by Benny Chan's Big Bullet)" and praising the plot and characters as "well-drawn" and the camerawork as "Mr. Lam's best". Derek Elley of Variety gave the film a positive review noting that Ringo Lam "invests the outwardly formulaic crimer with dark character play and a visceral power that are new in his career."

A review from the BBC gave the film three stars out of five calling it "far more entertaining" than Ringo Lam's previous film Maximum Risk and that the film "has its moments". Sight & Sound referred to the film as a "bravura thriller" with "car chases and shoot-outs are staged with ingenuity." and that it was "excellently acted by the two leads Lau Ching-Wan and Francis Ng". The review concluded that "Lam tells his story with such verve that we hardly notice it is riddled with clichés."

== See also ==
- Hong Kong films of 1997
