= Island of Greed =

1997 Hong Kong film by Michael Mak

- Film poster
- Traditional Chinese: 黑金
- Simplified Chinese: 黑金
- Hanyu Pinyin: Hēi Jīn
- Jyutping: Hak1 Gam1
- Directed by: Michael Mak
- Screenplay by: Johnny Mak
- Story by: Johnny Mak; Chan Man-keung; Lee Ying-kit; Jesse Hung; Liang Hai-chiang
- Produced by: Johnny Mak
- Starring: Andy Lau; Tony Leung; Pauline Suen; Annie Wu
- Cinematography: Jingle Ma; Tony Cheung; Lin Tien-kui
- Edited by: Poon Hung
- Music by: Raymond Wong; Landy Wei
- Production companies: Win's Entertainment; Johnny Mak Production
- Distributed by: China Star Entertainment Group
- Release date: 23 December 1997
- Running time: 126 minutes
- Country: Hong Kong
- Languages: Cantonese; Mandarin; Hokkien
- Box office: HK$18,146,790

Island of Greed is a 1997 Hong Kong action political crime thriller film directed by Michael Mak and starring Andy Lau and Tony Leung Ka-fai. The film is set and filmed in Taiwan and deals with corruption in the Government of the Republic of China.

== Plot ==
While investigating in Taiwan's gambling arcade scene, Captain Fong Kwok-fai (Andy Lau) of the Ministry of Justice Investigation Bureau's Tactical Squad discovers the mastermind to be Chow Chiu-sin (Tony Leung Ka-fai), a businessman and leader of the Chung-lam Triad who has decided to run as a member of the Legislative Yuan and has bribed his way into office. Fong infiltrate one his arcades and prosecutes him for operating an underground casino, but Chow had paid the presiding judge and gets dismissed. Fong then convinces Chairman Lam Ching-piu of the Tak-cheong Construction Company to report Chow for blackmailing him, and record evidence of Chow in bid rigging for the construction of Coastal Highway. Chow catches Lam and drags him on a fishing hook through a plantation as Fong and his squad give chase while evading Chow's attack dogs and manage to rescue Lam. Fong exposes Chow to the public, so the Kuomintang decides to nominate his rival, Ting Chung-shu, to run for the Legislative Yuan instead. Angered, Chow matches into Ting's press conference to announce that he is running for the Legislative Yuan without a political party. During this time, Fong is also suspended from his duties as his superior officer, Suen Ching-lim, is also corrupt.

As Chow and Ting rally, rival taxi driving company leaders Country and White Cloud, who respectively supports Chow and Ting, fight each other for customers. With support of Country Taxi director Kwan, Chow turns the disputes into a riot. Chow instructs his wife Miu-heung (Pauline Suen) to attend a ball, where National Police Agency Commissioner Tung's wife is present so Tung would plead Chow to stop the riot and Chow would be touted as a hero to the public. Fong's father, who is a taxi driver, gets caught in the riot but Fong manages to save him, as both manage to escape an explosion.

With the help of his journalist girlfriend Ling Fei (Annie Wu), Fong convinces the Justice Minister Fung King-chung to reinstate his position and fully supports him in combating corruption. However, Ting sends killers after Fong, who manage to take them down but one of his subordinates, Nicotine, who is killed. Ting attempts to frame Chow for the murder of Nicotine, but Miu-heung manages to help her husband win public support. Afterwards, Chow hires a prostitute to seduce and murder Ting, as Chow gets elected into the Legislative Yuan with 125,000 votes, and Fong returns to work after his superiors give him the order to take down Chow.

Fong later captures Sung Miu-tin, a fraudant cult leader and drug trafficker in cahoots with Chow, using him to enter Chow's mansion as Fong and his squad go undercover. Chow meets other twelve members of the Legislative Yuan who are also triad leaders and suggests starting their own political party, during which Fong and squad takes down Chow's guards and gain evidence of his crimes from his computer. Chow then kills Deputy Minister Hau of the Kuomintang, who has been taking advantage of him. Outnumbered and lost, Chow attempts to flee Taiwan in a thirteen-vehicle entourage, while Fong intercepts him in a helicopter and fires missiles which blows up several entourage vehicles. Chow retaliates by firing a rocket launcher at Fong, who escapes narrowly and engages in a scuffle with Chow. They are interrupted by an explosion which kills Miu-heung, as Chow breaks down before being arrested. Chow is subsequently sentenced to prison for disfranchisement and death row, while Fong resigns from the Investigation Bureau due to public pressure and involvement of manipulating high officials. He announces his bid to run for Mayor of Taipei in 1997 and marries Fei.

== Cast ==
- Andy Lau as Fong Kwok-fai (方國輝), captain of Ministry of Justice Investigation Bureau's Tactical Squad who is determined in combating corruption in Taiwan.
- Tony Leung Ka-fai as Chow Chiu-sin (周朝先), leader of the Chung-lam Triad (松林幫) and businessman with a net worth of NT$3 billion and bribes his way to be elected as a member of the Legislative Yuan in order to obtain pardon of his past crime.
- Pauline Suen as Tsui Miu-heung (崔妙香), Chow's wife who used to be a club girl in Singapore in the past.
- Annie Wu as Ling Fei (淩飛), a journalist and news broadcaster who becomes Fong's girlfriend, sharing similar values with him.
- Kelly Kuo as Mui Mei-lai (梅美麗), a member of Fong's Tactical Squad.
- Doze Niu as Ngai Kin-kwok (倪建國), nicknamed Nicotine (尼古丁), a member of Fong's Tactical Squad who was killed by Ting's killer sent after Fong at Shilin Night Market.
- Lee Li-chun as Deputy Chairman Hau (侯副部長), a senior Kuomintang officials in cahoots with Chow but eventually turns against him.
- Chin Shih-chieh as Suen Ching-lim (孫清廉), Fong's superior officer and mentor who turns out to be corrupt.
- Winston Chao as Fung King-chung (馮敬宗), the Minister of Justice of Taiwan who fully supports Fong in combating corruption even if it costs him his position.
- Liu Fu-juh as Lam Ching-piu (林清標), chairman of Tak-cheung Construction Company (德昌建築股份有限公司) who is blackmailed by Chow and reports him to the Investigation Bureau.
- Wang Jui as Fong Kwok-fai's father who is a taxi driver.
- Adam Chan as Wah Shu-tong (華恕堂), a member of Fong's Tactical Squad.
- Wong Ching-lam as Sam Pau (三炮), Chow's second in command.
- Kong Yeung as Commissioner Tung (董署長), commissioner of Taipei's National Police Agency.
- Wang Ping as Commissioner Tung's wife.

== Theme songs ==
- World's First Class (世界第一等)
  - Composer: Wu Bai
  - Lyricist: Preston Lee, Chen Fu-rong
  - Singer: Andy Lau
- Tears of a Lonely Star (孤星淚)
  - Composer / Lyricist: Wu Bai
  - Singer: Andy Lau

== Production ==
=== Controversy ===
During the filming of a stunt sequence, Andy Lau damaged a helicopter that was rented from Taiwanese airline company, Daily Air Corporation. In 1998, Daily Air filed a lawsuit against Lau and production company, Win's Entertainment, where the case dragged on for 16 years. In January 2014, Lau was found liable for brushing against the pitch stick of the chopper before jumping out of it. Initially, Lau ordered was to pay NT$5.1 million in compensation, but the amount was raised to NT$6.9 million after Lau lost an appeal. Following another appeal, the compensation was lowered to NT$2.6 million.

== Box office ==
The film grossed HK$18,146,790 at the Hong Kong box office during its theatrical run in Hong Kong.

== Accolades ==
Accolades
Ceremony	Category	Recipient	Outcome
17th Hong Kong Film Awards	Best Screenplay	Johnnie Mak	Nominated
17th Hong Kong Film Awards	Best Actor	Tony Leung	Nominated
17th Hong Kong Film Awards	Best Actress	Pauline Suen	Nominated
17th Hong Kong Film Awards	Best Action Choreography	Yuen Bun	Nominated
17th Hong Kong Film Awards	Best Art Direction	Lee King-man	Nominated
17th Hong Kong Film Awards	Best Original Film Song	Song: Tears of a Lonely Star (孤星淚) Composer / Lyricist: Wu Bai; Singer: Andy Lau)	Nominated
17th Hong Kong Film Awards	Best Sound Design	Island of Greed	Nominated
