= Armageddon (1997 film) =

1997 Hong Kong film by Gordon Chan

- Film poster

Chinese name
- Traditional Chinese: 天地雄心
- Simplified Chinese: 天地雄心
Transcriptions
Standard Mandarin
- Hanyu Pinyin: Tiān Dì Xióng Xīn
Yue: Cantonese
- Jyutping: Tin1 Dei6 Hung4 Sam1
- Directed by: Gordon Chan
- Written by: Gordon Chan; Vincent Kok
- Produced by: Gordon Chan
- Starring: Andy Lau; Michelle Reis; Anthony Wong
- Cinematography: Wong Wing-hang
- Edited by: Chan Kei-hop
- Music by: Chan Kwong-wing
- Production company: Win's Entertainment
- Distributed by: China Star Entertainment Group
- Release date: 22 March 1997
- Running time: 112 minutes
- Country: Hong Kong
- Language: Cantonese
- Box office: HK$27,698,750

Armageddon is a 1997 Hong Kong action sci-fi romance film directed by Gordon Chan, and starring Andy Lau, Michelle Reis and Anthony Wong.

== Summary ==
In the near future, 10 men are voted as the 10 who could lead the world; on the list is leading Hong Kong scientist Dr. Ken (Andy Lau). When some of the other important figures on the list start dying in suspicious cases of spontaneous human combustion, the Hong Kong CID and the British MI6 get involved to try to protect Dr. Ken. Ken's close friend in the Hong Kong police, Chiu (Anthony Wong) helps Ken stay out of trouble.

== Cast ==
- Andy Lau as Dr. Tak Ken
- Michelle Reis as Adele
- Anthony Wong as Chiu Tai-pang
- Vincent Kok as TC
- Wayne Lai as Chuck
- Claudia Lau as Superintendent Ivy Yip
- Jessica Chau as Teresa
- Michael Lui as Clarence Chung
- Angel Wong as Janis
- Kam Kong as Mr. Yao
- Jacky Wong
- Steven Lau
- Nunzio Caponio

== See also ==
- Andy Lau filmography
