= Young and Dangerous 4 =

1997 Hong Kong film by Andrew Lau

- DVD cover
- Directed by: Andrew Lau
- Written by: Manfred Wong
- Produced by: Manfred Wong
- Starring: Ekin Cheng; Jordan Chan; Jason Chu; Jerry Lamb; Michelle Reis; Roy Cheung; Pinky Cheung; Michael Tse; Karen Mok; Roland Wong; Anthony Wong; Alex Man; Sandra Ng; Vincent Wan
- Cinematography: Andrew Lau
- Music by: Ronald Ng
- Distributed by: Golden Harvest Company; BoB and Partners Co. Ltd. Warner Bros. Pictures
- Release date: 28 March 1997
- Running time: 106 minutes
- Country: British Hong Kong
- Language: Cantonese

Young and Dangerous 4 (Chinese: 97古惑仔之戰無不勝; Literal Title 97 Wise Guys: No War Cannot Be Won) is a 1997 Hong Kong triad film directed by Andrew Lau. It is the third sequel to the Young and Dangerous film series.

== Synopsis ==
The film opens in 1996. It begins with the wedding of Dai Tin Yee and his girlfriend. At the wedding, Chan Ho Nam agrees to travel to Thailand with the other branch leaders of Hung Hing in order to invite Chiang Tin Yeung, Chiang Tin Sang's elder brother, to lead the Hung Hing triad. While 6 of the 12 branch leaders are in Thailand, Dinosaur, back in Hong Kong, who leads the Tuen Mun area for Hung Hing is assassinated by being thrown over a building by Tiger of rival gang Tung Sing society. The following day, Chan Ho Nam and his fellow leaders in Thailand learn of Dinosaur's demise and agree to elect a new branch leader for the Tuen Mun area. The two nominees are Barbarian (Dinosaur's right-hand man) and Chicken San Gai (Chan Ho Nam's right-hand man). Chan Ho Nam warns Chicken of the dangers of running for branch leader but Chicken chooses to run anyway, causing a feud among their friendship. Meanwhile, Chiang Tin Yeung agrees to head back to Hong Kong to lead the Hung Hing society. He declares that Barbarian and Chicken are given a time period of one month to prove themselves worthy of leading Tuen Muen for Hung Hing. Barbarian gets support from Fatty Lai, the branch leader of North Point, and it's revealed that Fatty Lai's printing studio was once nearly burnt under the orders of Uncle Bee by Chan Ho Nam, which made them enemies. Meanwhile Chicken also gets support from Ben Hon, Sister 13, Tai Fei, and Prince.

Back in Hong Kong, Shuk Fan begins her career as a teacher with the worst students in the high school and she is able to temporarily befriend them. She also introduces her colleague Yan Yan to Chan Ho Nam, who lost his girlfriend previously. Chan Ho Nam lies to Yan Yan, saying that he's a tutorial teacher. Meanwhile, Chicken is fighting an uphill battle for his candidacy for Tuen Mun. Barbarian, who is a local of Tuen Mun, already has the upper hand in terms of support from the locals. Chicken tries to throw parties, but no one attends as everyone else is at Barbarian's party. At every turn, Chicken is continuously humiliated by Barbarian. Barbarian even has help from Tiger of rival gang Tung Sing. Tiger provides Barbarian with his wisdom, support, and money. He hopes to gain his own control of the Tuen Muen area with his own society with Barbarian as his puppet.

All of Chicken's supporters come under attack and Barbarian's victory is almost in his grasp. Banana who helped run a bar for Chicken is accused of drugging his customers and is arrested. In reality, the drugs were planted by accomplices of Barbarian. Shuk Fan is attacked by her students and Chan Ho Nam substitutes for her. He warns the students of the dangers of the Triad Gangster world, but the students dismiss him. Yan Yan also began feeling suspicious about Chan Ho Nam's identity.

Dai Tin Yee attempts to assassinate Barbarian for Chicken as a token of their friendship. However, the assassination fails and Yee is severely injured. He would have died if Tai Fai hadn't intervened and saved Yee. Afterwards, Yee goes into hiding to recover his wounds. Pou Pei is seduced by Barbarian's younger brother's girlfriend and let slip the whereabouts of Yee to her. She relays the information back. Tiger along with Fatty Lai (Who has been working secretly with Tiger), and his men burst into Dai Tin Yee's apartment and rape his wife and throw him over the building, killing him.

That night, Chan Ho Nam reprimands Chicken for participating in an unnecessary election as a branch leader. Meanwhile, Yan Yan was also at the scene, which caused her to know about Chan Ho Nam's identity as a Hung Hing branch leader. Chan Ho Nam goes into depression and drinks himself to the ground. Yan Yan carries him into her own home, and the two had relationships unexpectedly.

The final moment has arrived and Chicken has to face off against Barbarian in a debate. The debate is extremely heated. Chicken is barely able to fend off the accusations by Barbarian. Barbarian is being directed by Tiger by use of a headphone and mouthpiece who is the source of Barbarian's quick thinking. After the voting, Barbarian is almost declared as the winner when they are interrupted by Sister 13 and Ben Hon. They bring with them an informant. The girl who had seduced Pou Pei had earlier been betrayed by Barbarian's younger brother and now knows all the dirty tricks Barbarian was using. Right when she reveals all the details of Barbarian, she is shot by Tiger. Meanwhile, Barbarian tries to attack her but is subdued. His hat falls off, revealing the headpiece he was using to communicate with Tiger and all see him for what he really is. Tiger meanwhile is cornered by all of Hung Hing. Prince volunteered as Chian Tin Yeung decides to elect someone to fight Tiger, but Chan Ho Nam decides to take the reason to avenge Dai Tin Yee to fight. A fight ensues and Tiger takes out a pocket knife as a dirty trick, suddenly Fatty Lai interferes and kills Tiger with a katana. Afterwards, Fatty Lai announces his loyalty to Hung Hing. Fortunately, Chiang Tin Yeung knows that Fatty Lai is trying to keep his cahoots with Tiger in secret, and as a punishment, Fatty Lai is banished to Albania. Tai Fei replaces Fatty Lai as the branch leader of North Point.

With Barbarian exposed and in captive, Chicken is elected to be branch leader of Tuen Mun.

In the aftermath, Sister 13 delivers a letter addressed to Chan Ho Nam. Chan Ho Nam reads the letter and found that Yan Yan rejects him due to his identity as a Hung Hing branch leader but will remember the times she spent. The film ends with Chan Ho-Nam and Chicken Chiu as equal branch leaders.

== Cast ==
- Ekin Cheng - Chan Ho-Nam
- Jordan Chan - Chicken Chiu
- Jason Chu - Banana Skin (also played Chow Pan in a flashback)
- Jerry Lamb - Pou-Pan
- Michelle Reis - Lee Yan-kin
- Roy Cheung - Lui Yiu-Yeung/Thunder Tiger
- Pinky Cheung - K.K.
- Michael Tse - Dai Tin-yee
- Karen Mok - Lam Suk-Fan/Wasabi
- Roland Wong - Superman
- Anthony Wong Chau-Sang - Tai Fai
- Alex Man - Chiang Tin Yeung
- Sandra Ng - Sister 13
- Vincent Wan - Ben Hon
- Spencer Lam - Father Lam
- Lee Siu-kei - Key
- Samuel Leung - Class Student
- Ken Lo - Prince
- Ng Chi Hung - Tiger

== See also ==
- Young and Dangerous (series)
