= Annie Wu (actress) =

Taiwanese actress and model (born 1978)

Annie Wu Chen Chun
- Born: 21 August 1978 (age 46); Republic of China (Taiwan)
- Education: high school, Taipei Hwa Kang Arts School
- Occupation(s): Actress, Model
- Years active: 1996 - present
- Spouse: Aaron Liao (m. 2012) (2 child)

Chinese name
- Traditional Chinese: 吳辰君
Transcriptions
Standard Mandarin
- Hanyu Pinyin: Wú Chénjūn
Yue: Cantonese
- Jyutping: Ng4 San4 Gwan1

Annie Wu (born 21 August 1978) is a Taiwanese actress and model.

She has mainly acted in mainland Chinese TV series, and was featured in Jackie Chan's Police Story 4: First Strike. Though not fluent in Cantonese, she has also been featured in several Hong Kong films and magazine spreads. During her part in First Strike, Jackie Chan joked how horrible her Cantonese was and subsequently her voice was dubbed over with another voice. After several years with small parts in Hong Kong movies she is no longer active in the Hong Kong entertainment scene, and has primarily acted in roles in China. As of 2007 she is still acting and maintains a blog about her life. She's currently featured in a Korean/China co-produced series called Mama's Soup House.

In 2012, Wu married Aaron Liao, the son of Liao Hui, a former vice chairman of the Chinese People’s Political Consultative Conference. They have one daughter, Mia, born in 2014. They have one son born in 2019.

== Filmography ==
- Breaking the Waves (2014)
- From Vegas to Macau (2014)
- Sweet Summer Love (2013)
- Lost in Panic Cruise (2011)
- Hugupo (English: Aunt Tiger) (2005) — Ming-yueh
- Di ba hao dang pu (English: Pawnshop No. 8) (2004) — An Qi
- Zhongji ximen (English: West Town Girls ) (2004) — Porsch
- Asian Charlie's Angels (2004) TV Series — Annabelle
- Peach Girl (2002); Xiao Tao TV Series
- Feng yun (English: The Storm Riders or Wind and Cloud) (2002) TV Series
- Final Fantasy: The Spirits Within (2001) (voice) — uncredited
- Ai qing guan zi zai (English: Love Au Zen) (2001)
- Snakeheads (2001)
- Yau guk yeuk wui (English: Eerie Valley Appointment or Twilight Garden) (2000) — Queenie
- Ai qing min gan di dai (English: Love Paradox) (2000) — Fong Fong
- Da ying jia (English: Winner Takes All) (2000)
- Gorgeous (1999) — Xiao Jun
- Faces of Horror (English: Faces of Horrid) (1998)
- Maang gwai jeung yan toi (Mandarin: Meng gui shi ren tai English: The Demon's Baby) (1998) — Little Fish.
- Sha sha ren, tiao tiao miu (English: Ballistic Kiss) (1998) — Carrie
- Hak gam (1997) (Mandarin: Hei jin English: Black Gold or Island of Greed) — Ling Fai
- Boon sang yuen (Mandarin: Ban sheng yuan English: Eighteen Springs) (1997) — Shi Cuizhi
- Ai qing amoeba (English: Love: Amoeba Style) (1997) — Evita
- Sang yat doh luen si (1997) — Wendy
- Police Story 4: First Strike (1996) — Annie Tsui
- Fei hu xiong xin 2 zhi ao qi bi tian gao (Cantonese: Fei foo hung sam 2 ji ngo hei bei tin go English: Best of the Best) (1996) — Annie Ng Ching-Yee
