= Fruit Chan =

Hong Kong filmmaker

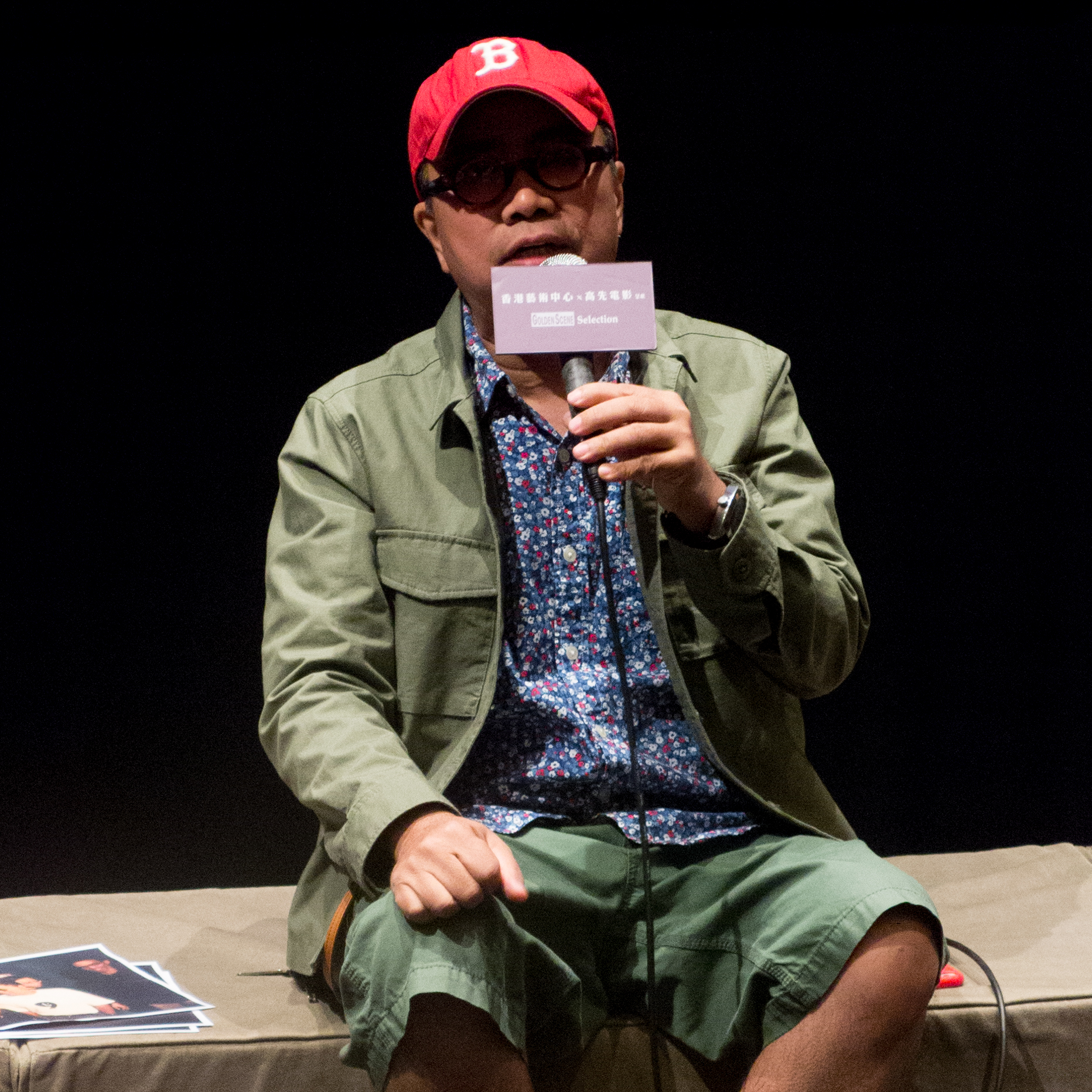
- Fruit Chan at the Hong Kong Art Centre, 28 July 2017
- Born: Chen Guo; 15 April 1959 (age 67); Guangdong, China
- Awards: Hong Kong Film Awards – Best Director; 1998 Made in Hong Kong; Best Screenplay; 2001 Durian Durian Golden Bauhinia Awards – Best Director; 1998 Made in Hong Kong; Best Screenplay; 2001 Durian Durian Hong Kong Film Critics Society Awards – Best Director; 1998 Made in Hong Kong; 2015 The Midnight After; Best Screenplay; 2003 Hollywood Hong Kong Golden Horse Awards – Best Director; 1997 Made in Hong Kong; 2002 Hollywood Hong Kong; Best Original Screenplay; 1997 Made in Hong Kong; 2000 Little Cheung; 2001 Durian Durian

Fruit Chan Gor
- Traditional Chinese: 陳果
- Simplified Chinese: 陈果
Transcriptions
Standard Mandarin
- Hanyu Pinyin: Chén Guǒ
Yue: Cantonese
- Jyutping: can4 gwo2

Fruit Chan Gor (Chinese: 陳果; born 15 April 1959) is a Hong Kong filmmaker who is best known for his style of film reflecting the everyday life of Hong Kong people. He is well known for using amateur actors (such as Sam Lee in Made in Hong Kong, Wong Yau-Nam in Hollywood Hong Kong) in his films. He became a household name after the success of the 1997 film Made in Hong Kong, which earned many local and international awards.

== Early life ==
Chan was born in Guangdong, China. His English name is a calque (literal translation) of his personal name Guo (果). Growing up, he watched a lot of films from Communist countries.

He and his family moved to Hong Kong in July 1971. His family was poor and Chan worked in an electronics factory while finishing Forms 1 to 3 at night school. He later got a job as a projectionist in Jordan, Hong Kong, where he developed an interest in international cinema.

He later enrolled in a one-year film studies course at the Film Culture Society, garnering admission by lying about his secondary education experience and working odd jobs to pay for tuition.

== Career ==
He continued his interest in film later on at the Hong Kong Film Culture Centre, a small film club, where he studied script writing and directing. In 1982, after only one year of working at the Hong Kong Film Culture Centre he started his career in the film industry. He began his career as an assistant director to David Lai Dai-Wai in the film Mid-Night Girls. He later worked as an assistant director to mainstream directors Jackie Chan, Kirk Wong, Ronny Yu, and Shu Kei.

His break came in 1991 when a film he was working with stopped its production. Chan took this as an opportunity; he used the same studio to direct Finale in Blood. However, the outcome of the first of his own films was highly praised by the critics rather than the public. In 1994 he collected a total of HKD500,000 and film-materials left over by other productions to begin directing his award-winning Made in Hong Kong. After Made in Hong Kong came out he was thought of as the hope for Hong Kong cinema by fellow Hong Kong filmmakers for challenging the stable model of Hong Kong filmmaking. He had become the first filmmaker to, independently of the big studios, challenge the genre of Hong Kong films and make realistic films about the political and social situations going on in Hong Kong at the time. The film was the first part to a trilogy that included The Longest Summer and Little Cheung.

In 2002, Chan was a member of the jury at the 24th Moscow International Film Festival.

Chan was selected to head the jury for the 2015 Taipei Film Festival.

== Style and influences ==
Chan lists Japanese directors, particularly from the 1960s such as Nagisa Ōshima, as his primary influences. Ōshima specifically was the influence for Chan's film Made in Hong Kong (1997).

Chan's films often focus on the "raw, often bleak, view of life of Hong Kong's working class."

== Filmography ==
=== As director ===
- Finale in Blood (大鬧廣昌隆) (1993)
- The 1997 Trilogy (九七三部曲) (referring to the year of Hong Kong's handover to the People's Republic of China)
  - Made in Hong Kong (香港製造) (1997)
  - The Longest Summer (去年煙花特別多) (1998)
  - Little Cheung (細路祥) (1999)
- The Prostitute Trilogy (妓女三部曲)
  - Durian Durian (榴槤飄飄) (2000)
  - Hollywood Hong Kong (香港有個荷里活) (2001)
  - Three Husbands (三夫) (2018)
- Public Toilet (人民公廁) (2002)
- Three... Extremes (三更2) (2004) – segment "Dumplings"
- Dumplings (餃子) (2004)
- Chengdu, I Love You (2009) – segment "1976"
- Don't Look Up (2009), a remake of the 1996 Japanese horror film Don't Look Up
- Tales from the Dark 1 (2013) – segment Jing Zhe
- The Midnight After (2014)
- Kill Time (2016)
- The Invincible Dragon (2019)
- The Abortionist (墮胎師) (2019)
- Coffin Homes (2021)

=== As scriptwriter ===
- Bugis Street (1995)
- The 1997 Trilogy 九七三部曲
  - Little Cheung 細路祥 (1999)
  - The Longest Summer 去年煙花特別多 (1998)
  - Made in Hong Kong 香港製造 (1997)
- The Prostitute Trilogy 妓女三部曲
  - Hollywood Hong Kong 香港有個荷里活 (2001)
  - Durian Durian 榴槤飄飄 (2000)
- Public Toilet 人民公廁 (2002)

=== As producer ===
- Public Toilet 人民公廁 (2002)
- Colour Blossoms 桃色 (2004)
- A-1 Headline (2004)
- Bliss (2006)
- Still Human 淪落人 (2019)

=== As actor ===
- Mrs K (2016)
