= Paulyn Sun =

Singaporean actress

- 孫佳君
- Born: Suen Kai-kwan; 11 September 1974 (age 51); Singapore
- Other names: Alien Sun; Pauline Suen
- Education: Simon Fraser University
- Occupation: Actress
- Years active: 1994–present
- Children: 2 sons

Chinese name
- Traditional Chinese: 孫佳君
- Simplified Chinese: 孙佳君
Transcriptions
Standard Mandarin
- Hanyu Pinyin: Sūn Jiājūn
Yue: Cantonese
- Jyutping: Syun1 Gaai1-gwan1

Paulyn Sun (born Suen Kai-kwan; 11 September 1974), also known as Alien Sun and Pauline Suen, is a Hongkonger-Singaporean actress and beauty pageant titleholder.

== Background ==
She became a Champion of the Miss Singapore Universe and represented Singapore at the Miss Universe 1994 but was unplaced. She quit her job in business development to launch an acting career in Hong Kong.

In 1996, she was offered HK$20 million to pose nude and rejected the offer. She was the first female from Singapore to be nominated for a Hong Kong Film Award in 1997 for her role in Island of Greed.

In 2000, she was featured in Wong Kar-wai's award-winning film In The Mood For Love but most of her scenes were not put into the final cut. She has worked in many commercials for ATV and beauty products in an effort to further advance her career. She is lesser known than her acting peers in Hong Kong despite her efforts. She can fluently speak English, Cantonese, Mandarin and Japanese and has used all four languages in her roles.

Sun has said during the DVD documentary for Ichi the Killer that her nickname "Alien Sun" was given to her by classmates in school who made fun of her for having a head that was slightly disproportionately larger than her body during childhood.

In 2012, Sun returned to the media industry after a 10 years break.

Sun has two sons, one born in 2004 and one born in 2008, with her former boyfriend.

== Filmography ==
- Project Gutenberg (2018)
- The Vanished Murderer (2015)
- Insanity (2015)
- Sara (2015)
- Hardcore Comedy (2013)
- May We Chat (2013)
- A Wedding Or A Funeral (2004) - Shirley
- Fu bo (2003)
- Bless The Child (2003)
- Sun Wukong (2002) (TV Series) - The Spider Evil
- Every Dog Has His Date (2001) - Cathy
- The Accidental Spy (2001) - (looking at gym instruments)
- Ichi the Killer (2001) - Karen
- In the Mood for Love (2000) (voice) - Mrs. Chow
- Last Ghost Standing (1999) - Officer Suen
- Troublesome Night 4 (1998) - Apple
- Love & Sex of the Eastern Hollywood (1998) - Selina/Pink
- The Untold Story 2 (1998) - Fung
- Island of Greed (1997) - Tsui Miu-Heung
- Killing Me Hardly (1997) - Starry
- Up for the Rising Sun (1997)
- Mr. Mumble (1996) - Sharon
- Love and Sex Among the Ruins (1996) - Madam Ron
- Lover's Tears (1996) -
- Banana Club (1996) - Vee
- Sixty Million Dollar Man (1995) - Bonnie
- Lover's Tears (1995) - Kam Hing
- The Golden Girls (1995) - May Chu
- Doug's Choice (1994)
