= List of Hong Kong films of 1989 =

This article lists feature-length Hong Kong films released in 1989.

== Box office ==
The highest-grossing Hong Kong films released in 1989, by domestic box office gross revenue, are as follows:

Highest-grossing films released in 1989
Rank	Title	Domestic gross
1	God of Gamblers	HK$36,294,029
2	Miracles	HK$34,036,029
3	Mr. Coconut	HK$31,246,447
4	All About Ah-Long	HK$30,913,083
5	Casino Raiders	HK$23,292,339
6	Aces Go Places 5: The Terracotta Hit	HK$20,032,206
7	A Better Tomorrow III: Love & Death in Saigon	HK$18,476,116
8	The Killer	HK$18,255,083
9	The Inspector Wears Skirts II	HK$18,151,313
10	It's a Mad, Mad, Mad World III	HK$16,686,891

== Releases ==
Title	Director	Cast	Genre	Notes
A Fishy Story	Anthony Chan	Kenny Bee, Maggie Cheung, Anthony Chan		
Aces Go Places V	Lau Kar-leung	Samuel Hui, Leslie Cheung, Karl Maka		
All About Ah-Long	Johnnie To	Chow Yun-fat, Sylvia Chang, Huang Kun-hsuan		
All Night Long	Peter Mak Tai-kit	Carol Cheng, Feng Tsui-fan, Elizabeth Lee		
Amusing Star	Chui Chik Lim			
Angel III	Teresa Woo, Paul Kalbach, Stanley Tong, Tang Tak-wing	Alex Fong, Moon Lee, Kharina Isa		Stanley Tong and Tang Tak-wing credited as executive directors
Angel Enforcers	He Zhiqiang	Sharon Yueng Pan-pan, Cheung Kwok-leung, Ha Chi-chun		
Armageddon	Huang Shaojun	Alex Man, Irene Wan, Norman Chu		
Avenging Trio	Yuen Qiu	Gordon Liu, Bryan Leung, Lelia Chow		
The Bachelor's Swan Song	Derek Yee	Kenny Bee, Maggie Cheung, Lawrence Cheng		
A Better Tomorrow 3	Tsui Hark	Chow Yun-fat, Tony Leung Ka-fai, Anita Mui		
Beyond The Sunset	Jacob Cheung	Richard Ng, Bo-bo Fung, Cecilia Yip		
Big Man Little Affair	Go Gam Tong	Michael Wong, Andrew Lam, Li Yanshan		
The Blonde Fury	Mang Hoi	Cynthia Rothrock, Jeff Falcon, Vincent Lyn	Action	
Blood Ritual	Li Yuen-ching	Chiu Siu-keung, Gina Lam, Dion Lam		
Bloody Brotherhood	Johnny Wang	Andy Lau, Irene Wan, Lam Wai		
Casino Raiders	Jimmy Heung, Wong Jing	Andy Lau, Alan Tam, Idy Chan, Rosamund Kwan		
China White	Ronny Yu	Russell Wong, Steven Vincent Leigh, Lisa Schrage	Action thriller	
City Kids 1989	Poon Man Kit	Max Mok, Andy Lau, May Lo		
City Squeeze	Clifton Ko	Kenny Bee, James Wong, Elizabeth Lee		
Crocodile Hunter	Wong Jing	Andy Lau, Alex Man, Sandra Ng		
Doubles Causes Troubles	Wong Jing	Carol Cheng, Maggie Cheung, Natalis Chan		
Dragon Fight	Billy Tang Hin-Shing	Jet Li, Stephen Chow, Nina Li Chi		
The Empress Dowager	Li Han-chieng	Liu Xiaoqing, Gong Li, Chen Ye		
Final Run	Philip Ko	Miu Kiu-wai, Cheung Kwok-keung, Simon Yam		
The First Time Is the Last Time	Raymond Leung	Carrie Ng, Season Ma, Andy Lau		
Forever Young	Eric Tsang	Ray Lui, Wilson Lam, Lam Kin Ming		
Funny Ghost	Yuen Cheung-yan	Natalis Chan, Sandra Ng, Billy Wong		
God of Gamblers	Wong Jing	Chow Yun-fat, Andy Lau, Joey Wong		
The Iceman Cometh	Clarence Fok	Yuen Biao, Maggie Cheung, Yuen Wah		
In the Line of Duty 4: Witness	Yuen Woo-ping	Donnie Yen, Cynthia Khan, Michael Wong		
The Inspector Wears Skirts Part II	Wellson Chin	Sibelle Hu, Sandra Ng Kwun-Yu, Kara Hui Ying-Hung		
Just Heroes	John Woo, Wu Ma	John Chiang, Danny Lee, Chen Kuan-tai, Stephen Chow		
The Killer	John Woo	Chow Yun-fat, Danny Lee, Sally Yeh	Gangster film	
Little Cop	Eric Tsang	Eric Tsang, Maggie Cheung, Natalis Chan		
Live Hard	Yuen Cheung Yan	Simon Yam, Lau Ching-wan, Elaine Liu		
Long Arm of the Law III	Michael Mak	Andy Lau, Elizabeth Lee, Max Mok		
Lucky Guys	Yau Ka Hung	Jacky Cheung, Eric Tsang, Andrew Lam		
Miracles	Jackie Chan	Jackie Chan, Anita Mui, Gua Ah-leh		
My Dear Son	David Chiang	Jacky Cheung, Maggie Cheung, Bill Tung		
My Heart Is That Eternal Rose	Patrick Tam	Kenny Bee, Joey Wong, Tony Leung Chiu-Wai		
News Attack	Samson Chiu	Andy Lau, Eric Tsang, Wilson Lam		
The Nobles	Norman Chan	Carol Cheng, Jacky Cheung, Michael Wong		
Peacock King (film)	Nam Nai-choi	Yuen Biao, Gloria Yip, Wong Siu-fung		
Pedicab Driver	Sammo Hung	Sammo Hung, Lowell Lo, Yuen Biao		
Perfect Match	Dennis Chan	George Lam, Carol Cheng, Andy Lau		
Proud and Confidence	King Lee	Andy Lau, Rosamund Kwan, Michael Miu		
Return of the Lucky Stars	Fung Shui-fan	Richard Ng, Eric Tsang, Fung Shui-fan		
Runaway Blues	David Lai	Andy Lau, Kelvin Wong, Shirley Lui	Crime thriller	
Sentenced to Hang	Taylor Wong	Tony Leung, Carrie Ng, Kent Cheng		
Seven Warriors	Terry Tong	Adam Cheng, Jacky Cheung, Max Mok, Tony Leung Chiu-Wai		
Stars and Roses	Taylor Wong	Andy Lau, Cherie Chung, Shing Fui-On		
They Came to Rob Hong Kong	Clarence Fok	Eric Tsang, Dean Shek, Roy Cheung		
Thunder Cops II	Jeffrey Lau	Sandra Ng, Stephen Chow, Ann Bridgewater	Thriller	
Triads: The Inside Story	Taylor Wong	Chow Yun-fat, Roy Cheung, Michael Chan Wai-man	Gangster film	
The Truth - Final Episode	Michael Mak	Andy Lau, Deanie Ip, Paul Chun		
Vampire Buster	Norman Law, Stanley K. W. Siu	Nat Chan Pak-cheung, Kent Cheng, Fung Shui-fan		
Vampire Vs. Vampire	Lam Ching Ying	Lam Ching Ying, Chin Siu Ho, Lui Fong		
Web of Deception	David Chung	Brigitte Lin, Joey Wang, Pauline Wong		
Wild Search	Ringo Lam	Chow Yun-fat, Cherie Chung, Paul Chun		
