= 9th Hong Kong Film Awards =

1990 Hong Kong Film Awards

- Date: 8 April 1990
- Site: The Hong Kong Academy for Performing Arts
- Hosted by: Philip Chan and John Sham

The 9th Hong Kong Film Awards ceremony, honored the best films of 1989 and took place on 8 April 1990 at Hong Kong Academy for Performing Arts, Wan Chai, Hong Kong. The ceremony was hosted by Philip Chan and John Sham, during the ceremony awards are presented in 15 categories.

== Awards ==
Winners are listed first, highlighted in boldface, and indicated with a double dagger (‡).

| **Best Film**: **Beyond the Sunset**‡; Eight Taels of Gold; A Fishy Story; All About Ah Long; The Killer | **Best Director**: **John Woo — The Killer**‡; Johnnie To — All About Ah-Long; Jacob Cheung — Beyond the Sunset; Anthony Chan — A Fishy Story; Mabel Cheung — Eight Taels of Gold |
| **Best Screenplay**: **Jacob Cheung and Chan Kam Cheung** **— Beyond the Sunset**‡; Ng Man Fai, Philip Cheng Chung Tai — All About Ah Long; John Woo — The Killer; Lip Wang Fung, Wong Man Yu, Lau Shek Yin and Gordon Chan — The Yuppie Fantasia; Derek Yee and Wong Chi Yat — Bachelor's Swan Song; Alex Law and Mabel Cheung — Eight Taels of Gold | **Best Actor**: **Chow Yun-fat — All About-Ah Long**‡; Jackie Chan — Miracles; Richard Ng — Beyond the Sunset; Chow Yun-fat — God of Gamblers; Sammo Hung — Eight Taels of Gold; Michael Hui — Mr. Coconut |
| **Best Actress**: **Maggie Cheung — A Fishy Story**‡; Carrie Ng — The First Time Is the Last Time; Fung Bo Bo — Beyond the Sunset; Sylvia Chang — Eight Taels of Gold; Sylvia Chang — All About Ah Long; Carina Lau — Her Beautiful Life Lies | **Best Supporting Actor**: **Tony Leung — My Heart Is That Eternal Rose**‡; Paul Chu Kong — The Killer; Shing Fui-On — Stars & Roses; Wong Kwan Yuen — All About Ah Long |
| **Best Supporting Actress**: **Cecilia Yip — Beyond the Sunset**‡; Pauline Wong — Web of Deception; Meg Lam — The First Time Is the Last Time; Seung Tin Ngoh — Sentenced to Hang; Josephine Koo — A Fishy Story | **Best New Performer**: **Kwong Wa — Life Goes On**‡; Sin Lap Man — The Reincarnation of Golden Lotus; Wong Kwan Yuen — All About Ah Long; Lung Fong — Casino Raiders; Law Chi Wai — Beyond the Sunset |
| **Best Film Editing**: **Fan Kung Wing — The Killer**‡; Peter Cheung — Miracles; Wong Chi Hung — The First Time Is the Last Time; Chiang Kwok Kuen — My Heart Is That Eternal Rose; Poon Hung — The Iceman Cometh | **Best Cinematography**: **Peter Pau — A Fishy Story**‡; Christopher Doyle — Her Beautiful Life Lies; Wong Wing Hung, Peter Pau — The Killer; Bill Wong — Eight Taels of Gold; Poon Hang Sang — The Iceman Cometh |
| **Best Art Direction**: **Szeto Wai Yung — A Fishy Story**‡; Eddie Ma — Miracles; Luk Chi Fung — A Better Tomorrow III; Yank Wong — Beyond the Sunset; Patrick Tam, Eddie Mok — My Heart Is That Eternal Rose | **Best Action Direction**: **Jackie Chan's Stuntman Association — Miracles**‡; Sammo Hung's Stunt Team, Yuen Wah and Yuen Tak — The Iceman Cometh; Brandy Yuen, Mang Hoi and Sammo Hung's Stunt Team — Pedicab Driver |
| **Best Original Film Score**: **Lo Ta-yu and Lo Sai Kit — Eight Taels of Gold**‡; Lowell Lo — A Better Tomorrow III; Lo Ta-yu and Lo Sai Kit — All About Ah Long | **Best Original Film Song**: **Composer: Lowell Lo • Lyrics: Poon Yuen Leung** **• Singer: Julie Su — Pedicab Driver**‡; Composer/Lyrics: Lo Ta-yu • Singer: Chyi Yu — Eight Taels of Gold; Composer: Lo Ta-yu • Lyrics: Richard Lam • Singer: Chow Yun-fat — Triads: the Inside Story; Composer: Lo Ta-yu • Lyrics/Singer: Sam Hui — All About Ah Long; Composer: Wong Ka Kui • Lyrics: Paul Wong • Singer: Wong Ka Kui — The Black Wall |
**Professional Achievement**: **Yat-Hung Chu**‡
