= Web of Deception =

Web of Deception may refer to:

- Web of Deception (1994 film), an American made-for-television thriller film
- Web of Deception (1989 film), a Hong Kong mystery thriller film
