= Peter Pau =

Hong Kong cinematographer

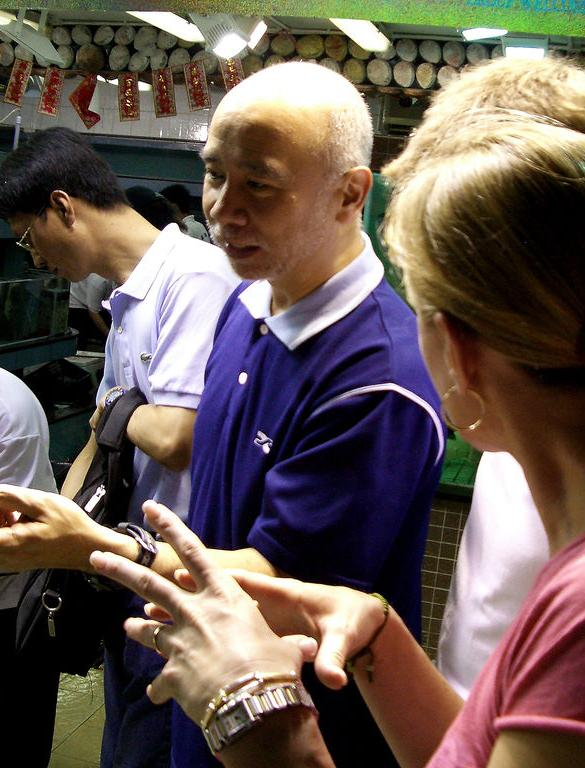
- Peter Pau in 2005
- Born: 1952 (age 73–74); Hong Kong
- Years active: 1985–present
- Organization: Hong Kong Society of Cinematographers

Chinese name
- Traditional Chinese: 鮑德熹
Transcriptions
Standard Mandarin
- Hanyu Pinyin: Bào Dé Xī
Yue: Cantonese
- Jyutping: Baau1 Dak1 Hei1

Peter Pau Tak-Hei (Chinese: 鮑德熹, born 1952) is a Hong Kong cinematographer and film director, best known to western audiences as for his work on Crouching Tiger, Hidden Dragon, for which he won the Academy Award for Best Cinematography.

The asteroid 34420 Peterpau was named in his honour in early 2006.

== Personal life ==
His older sister is Hong Kong Film Awards best actress winner Paw Hee-Ching.

== Filmography ==
Director

- Jue shi jia dao (1985)
- Misty (1992)
- The Touch (2002) (Also story writer)
- Zhong Kui: Snow Girl and the Dark Crystal (2015)

Actor

Year	Title	Role
1988	On the Run	
1991	Crazy Safari	Expert
1995	The Chinese Feast	Chef from North West Restaurant
2015	Zhongkui: Snow Girl and the Dark Crystal	God of Heaven

Cinematographer

Year	Title	Director	Notes
1985	Jue shi jia dao	Himself	
1986	Tian mi shi liu sui	Ken Siu	
1987	The Legend of Wisely	Teddy Robin	
1988	The Greatest Lover	Clarence Fok	
1988	Fatal Love	Po-Chih Leong	With Paul Chan, Hang Sang Poon and Wing-Hang Wong
1988	Hei Bo	Yan Yee Lee	With Hang-Sang Poon
1989	The Killer	John Woo	With Hang-Sang Poon
1989	A Fishy Story	Anthony Chan	
1989	God of Gamblers	Wong Jing	With David Chung
1989	A Terra-Cotta Warrior	Ching Siu-tung	With Hsin-Yeh Li
1990	The Swordsman	King Hu	With Andy Lam
1991	Bury Me High	Chi Li Tang; Siu-Ming Tsui	
1991	Tricky Brains	Wong Jing	
1991	Ho yat gwan joi loi	Tony Au	With David Chung, Peter Ngor and Bill Wong
1991	To Be Number One	Poon Man-kit	
1991	God of Gamblers III: Back to Shanghai	Wong Jing	
1991	The Banquet	Alfred Cheung; Joe Cheung; Clifton Ko; Tsui Hark	With David Chung, Ardy Lam, Andrew Lau, Kin-Keung Lee, Tak-Wai Lee, Chi-Wai Tam and Wing-Hang Wong
1991	Saviour of the Soul	Corey Yuen; David Lai; Jeffrey Lau	With Lee Tak-wai and Simon Li
1992	Justice, My Foot!	Johnnie To	
1992	Naked Killer	Clarence Fok	With William Yim
1992	Leung goh nuijen, yat goh leng, yat goh m leng	Stanley Kwan	Short film
1993	The Eagle Shooting Heroes	Jeffrey Lau	
1993	The Bride with White Hair	Ronny Yu	With Lee Tak-shing
1994	Treasure Hunt	Jeffrey Lau	
1995	The Chinese Feast	Tsui Hark	
1995	The Phantom Lover	Ronny Yu	
1995	Xiu Xiu han ta de nan ren	Henry Fong	
1997	Double Team	Tsui Hark	
1997	Warriors of Virtue	Ronny Yu	Also co-producer
1998	Anna Magdalena	Yee Chung-man	
1998	Bride of Chucky	Ronny Yu	
1999	Metade Fumaca	Kam-Hung Yip	
2000	Crouching Tiger, Hidden Dragon	Ang Lee	
2000	And I Hate You Sozh	Yee Chung-man	
2000	Dracula 2000	Patrick Lussier	
2001	Beijing Rocks	Mabel Cheung	
2002	The Touch	Himself	
2005	Perhaps Love	Peter Chan	
2005	The Promise	Chen Kaige	With Choi Shung-fai
2007	Shoot 'Em Up	Michael Davis	
2008	The Forbidden Kingdom	Rob Minkoff	
2010	Confucius	Hu Mei	
2011	Li xian ji li xian ji	Frant Gwo; Yang Li	
2012	I Do	Sun Zhou	
2013	Special ID	Clarence Fok	Also producer
2015	Zhong Kui: Snow Girl and the Dark Crystal	Himself; Zhao Tianyu	Also producer
2016	See You Tomorrow	Zhang Jiajia	With Yu Cao
2020	The Rescue	Dante Lam	
2021	The Battle at Lake Changjin	Chen Kaige; Tsui Hark; Dante Lam	With Islam Abdelbadia, Wenlong Cai, Yu Ding, Hu Gao, Pan Luo, Kenny Tse and Wing-Hang Wong
2022	The Battle at Lake Changjin II	Chen Kaige; Tsui Hark; Dante Lam	With Pan Luo
2025	Operation Hadal	Dante Lam	With Zhen Ye

== Awards and nominations ==
Year	Award	Category	Title	Result
2000	Academy Awards	Best Cinematography	Crouching Tiger, Hidden Dragon	Won
2000	Chicago Film Critics Association	Best Cinematography	Crouching Tiger, Hidden Dragon	Won
2000	Dallas–Fort Worth Film Critics Association	Best Cinematography	Crouching Tiger, Hidden Dragon	Won
2000	Los Angeles Film Critics Association	Best Cinematography	Crouching Tiger, Hidden Dragon	Won
2000	New York Film Critics Circle	Best Cinematographer	Crouching Tiger, Hidden Dragon	Won
2000	American Society of Cinematographers	Outstanding Cinematography	Crouching Tiger, Hidden Dragon	Nominated
2000	BAFTA Awards	Best Cinematography	Crouching Tiger, Hidden Dragon	Nominated
2000	National Society of Film Critics	Best Cinematography	Crouching Tiger, Hidden Dragon	Nominated
2000	San Diego Film Critics Society	Best Cinematography	Crouching Tiger, Hidden Dragon	Nominated
2000	Satellite Awards	Best Cinematography	Crouching Tiger, Hidden Dragon	Nominated
