= Happy Together (1989 Hong Kong film) =

1989 Hong Kong film by Stephen Shin

- Film poster
- Directed by: Stephen Shin
- Written by: Tony Leung Siu-hung; Lam Wai-lun; Cheng Siu-keung; Stephen Shin; Shin Kam-ching
- Produced by: Stephen Shin
- Starring: Cherie Chung; Vivian Chow; Lowell Lo; Chingmy Yau; Lawrence Cheng; Kenny Bee
- Cinematography: Cheng Siu-keung
- Music by: Violet Lam
- Production companies: D & B Films
- Release date: 19 August 1989 (Hong Kong)
- Running time: 90 minutes
- Country: Hong Kong
- Language: Cantonese

Happy Together (Chinese: 相見好) is a 1989 Hong Kong romantic comedy film co-written and directed by Stephen Shin. The film stars Cherie Chung and Kenny Bee in the lead roles. It was released on 19 August 1989, in Hong Kong.

== Cast and roles ==
- Cherie Chung
- Vivian Chow
- Lowell Lo
- Chingmy Yau
- Lawrence Cheng
- Kenny Bee
