= Behind the Yellow Line =

1984 Hong Kong film by Taylor Wong

- DVD cover
- Directed by: Taylor Wong
- Screenplay by: Gordon Chan; Chan Hing-ka; Lawrence Cheng; Sek Wai-man
- Story by: Jimmy Lo
- Produced by: Mona Fong
- Starring: Leslie Cheung; Maggie Cheung; Anita Mui; Anthony Chan
- Edited by: Siu Fung; Ma Chung-yiu; Chiu Cheuk-man
- Music by: Si Jan-hau; Stephen Shing
- Distributed by: Shaw Brothers Studio
- Release date: 3 October 1984
- Running time: 90 minutes
- Country: Hong Kong
- Language: Cantonese
- Box office: HK$8,755,898 (Hong Kong); CN¥13.9 million (China)

Behind the Yellow Line (Chinese: 緣份), also known as Fate, is a 1984 Hong Kong romantic comedy film directed by Taylor Wong and starring Leslie Cheung, Maggie Cheung, and Anita Mui. The film was released in Hong Kong on 3 October 1984.

== Plot ==
Paul (Leslie Cheung) meets Monica (Maggie Cheung) on the metro who he takes an immediate attraction to. Together, the two fend off Paul's obsessive suitor and Monica's toxic ex.

== Cast ==
- Leslie Cheung as Paul Chan
- Maggie Cheung as Monica
- Anita Mui as Anita
- Anthony Chan as Ng Wai
- Chan Lap-ban as Rubbish lady
- Lawrence Cheng as Cafe captain
- Connie Mak as DJ Mak Kit-man
- Alfred Cheung as Alfred Cheung
- Sze Kai-keung as Ng Wai's brother
- Yip Ha-lei as Paul's father
- Cheng Mang-ha as Paul's mother
- Michael Mak as Anita's boyfriend in MRT
- Michael Tong as Ben
- Tang Kei-chan as Building security guard
- Eric Yeung as Job interviewer
- Tang Wai-si
- Kwan Kam-ming
- Chang To-mei as Monica's studio colleague
- Nick Lam as Fat customer in cafe
- Tsui Oi-sam as Fat customer in cafe
- Titus Ho as Man in blue suit at bus stop
- Chin Tsi-ang as Granny in MRT
- Tai Wan-wai

== Release ==
The film was released in Hong Kong on 3 October 1984. It was released in mainland China on March 25, 2016.

== Reception ==
=== Box office ===
The film grossed HK$8,755,898 at the Hong Kong box office during its theatrical run from 3 to 18 October 1984. On its opening weekend in mainland China, the film grossed US$1.13 million. It grossed a total of CN¥13.86 million in mainland China.

=== Accolades ===
Awards and nominations
Ceremony	Category	Recipient	Outcome
4th Hong Kong Film Awards	Best Supporting Actress	Anita Mui	Won
4th Hong Kong Film Awards	Best Supporting Actor	Anthony Chan	Nominated
