= Mary from Beijing =

1992 Hong Kong film by Sylvia Chang

- Film poster
- 夢醒時分
- Directed by: Sylvia Chang
- Written by: Sylvia Chang
- Starring: Lawrence Ah Mon; Kenny Bee; Cynthia Cheung; David Chiang; Gong Li
- Cinematography: Christopher Doyle
- Edited by: Shun Yu
- Music by: Music Factory
- Production companies: Art & Talent Groupe Inc. Golden Harvest Productions
- Release dates: 24 December 1992 (Hong Kong); 10 September 1993 (Canada)
- Running time: 97 minutes
- Country: Hong Kong
- Languages: Cantonese; Mandarin; English

Mary from Beijing a.k.a. Awakening (Chinese: 夢醒時分) is a 1992 Hong Kong film written and directed by Sylvia Chang.

== Cast and roles ==
- Lawrence Ah Mon – Immigration Officer
- Kenny Bee – Wong Kwok-wai
- Cynthia Cheung – Elizabeth
- David Chiang – Yip
- Gong Li – Ma Li (Mary)
- Jan Lamb – Messenger
- Wilson Lam – Peter
- Pao Fong – Speaker at dedication
- Melvin Wong – Stanley
- Yuen King-Tan – Mahjong player
- Zhu Mu – Peter's father
- Francis Yau – Auctioneer
