= A Fishy Story =

1989 Hong Kong film by Anthony Chan

- DVD Cover
- Directed by: Anthony Chan
- Written by: Lo Wing Keung, Fong Ling Ching, Anthony Chan
- Produced by: Chan Pui Wah
- Starring: Kenny Bee; Maggie Cheung; Anthony Chan; Josephine Koo; Carrie Ng
- Cinematography: Peter Pau
- Edited by: Yu Shun; Kwong Chi Leung
- Music by: Richard Yuen
- Distributed by: Golden Harvest Productions (Hong Kong)
- Release date: 7 September 1989 (Hong Kong)
- Running time: 95 minutes
- Country: Hong Kong
- Languages: Cantonese; Mandarin
- Box office: HK$7,317,263

A Fishy Story (Chinese: 不脫襪的人; pinyin: Bù tuō wà de rén) is a 1989 Hong Kong drama film directed by Anthony Chan and starring Kenny Bee, Maggie Cheung and Anthony Chan.

== Synopsis ==
The film tells the tale of aspiring actress Huang (Maggie Cheung), who's trying to achieve fame and fortune in turbulent 1967 Hong Kong. While political unrest sweeps through the territory, Huang uses her looks and charm to romance various wealthy men in hopes of climbing the social ladder.

But times are rough for her, just as they are for her neighbour Kung (Kenny Bee), an unlicensed cab driver and a rich woman's toy boy. They don't get along well and despise each other. However, over the course of the movie, they go through so much together that they gradually become inseparable.

== Cast ==
- Kenny Bee - Kung
- Maggie Cheung - Huang
- Anthony Chan - Paul Chen
- Josephine Koo - Mrs. Koo
- Carrie Ng - Actress in Musical
- Margaret Lee - Actress in Drama
- Lam Chung - Movie Director

== Reception ==
A Fishy Story was critically acclaimed and a box office success in Hong Kong. Cheung's performance received positive reviews from critics.

== Awards and nominations ==
The movie received 6 nominations including Best Film, Best Director (Anthony Chan) and Best Supporting Actress (Josephine Koo) at 9th Hong Kong Film Awards which was held in 1990 and won for Best Cinematography (Peter Pau) and Best Art Direction (Szeto Wai Yung). Maggie Cheung won her first Best Actress Award.

== See also ==
- List of Hong Kong films
