= The Killer (1989 film) =

1989 Hong Kong film by John Woo

- Theatrical release poster

Chinese name
- Traditional Chinese: 喋血雙雄
- Simplified Chinese: 喋血双雄
- Literal meaning: pair of blood-splattering heroes
Transcriptions
Standard Mandarin
- Hanyu Pinyin: diéxuè shuāngxióng
Yue: Cantonese
- Jyutping: dip6 hyut3 soeng1 hung4
- Directed by: John Woo
- Written by: John Woo
- Produced by: Tsui Hark
- Starring: Chow Yun-fat; Danny Lee; Sally Yeh; Chu Kong; Kenneth Tsang; Shing Fui-On
- Cinematography: Peter Pau; Wing Hung Wong
- Edited by: Fan Kung-Ming
- Music by: Lowell Lo
- Production companies: Film Workshop; Magnum Presentations
- Distributed by: Golden Princess Film Production
- Release date: 6 July 1989 (Hong Kong)
- Running time: 110 minutes
- Country: Hong Kong
- Language: Cantonese
- Box office: HK$18.3 million

The Killer (Chinese: 喋血雙雄) is a 1989 Hong Kong action film directed by John Woo, and produced by Tsui Hark. The film stars Chow Yun-fat, Danny Lee, and Sally Yeh. Chow plays Ah Jong, a professional assassin for the Triads who wants to retire, but accidentally damages the eyes of singer Jennie (Yeh) during a shootout and sets out to perform one last hit to pay for her treatment.

After the financial backing from Hark became problematic following the release of Woo's film A Better Tomorrow II (1987), Woo had to find backing through Chow Yun-fat's and Danny Lee's financing companies. Woo went into filming The Killer with a rough draft whose plot was influenced by the films Le Samouraï, Mean Streets and Narazumono. Woo wanted to make a film about honour, friendship and the relationship of two seemingly opposite people. After finishing filming, Woo referred to The Killer as a tribute to directors Jean-Pierre Melville and Martin Scorsese.

The Killer was not an immediate success in Hong Kong but received critical acclaim internationally with reviewers praising its action scenes and over-the-top style. The film became Woo's stepping stone into Hollywood and has been a strong influence on many directors, including Quentin Tarantino, Robert Rodriguez and Johnnie To. In the years since, The Killer has come to be considered one of the greatest action films ever made. An English-language remake of the film, also directed by Woo, was released in August 2024.

== Plot ==
Ah Jong, a hitman, decides to retire after one final job. During a shootout with gangsters, he accidentally blinds a young nightclub singer named Jennie when his gun fires too close to her eyes, burning them. Over the next six months, he quietly watches over her, attending all of her performances. One night, he intervenes to save her from being mugged and assaulted; Jennie then invites him into her apartment. They grow close and begin a relationship. However, Jennie then learns from her doctor that if she does not undergo a corneal transplant, she will lose what remains of her sight. Ah Jong agrees to kill a high-ranking triad boss to pay for the operation.

Meanwhile, Detective Li Ying performs a botched undercover sting but is scolded and demoted by his superior for shooting a criminal inside a tram and unintentionally causing the fatal heart attack of a hostage. Li later spots Ah Jong in the middle of the hit on the Triad boss, but eventually loses him. Ah Jong's client, Wong Hoi, betrays him by sending hitmen to kill Ah Jong at the location of his getaway car. Ah Jong guns down the hitmen, but a child is badly injured in the crossfire. Ah Jong rushes the child to a nearby hospital while being followed by Li and his partner, Sgt. Tsang Yeh. Ah Jong holds Yeh at gunpoint until the child regains consciousness, then escapes from the police. Li becomes obsessed with Ah Jong's act of goodwill. He and Tsang learn about Jennie; when Ah Jong visits her, he manages to outwit and elude the two cops once again.

Li and Tsang explain to Jennie that Ah Jong was the assassin that blinded her at the nightclub. Ah Jong meets with his manager, Fung Sei, and demands the money he was promised for his last job. Sei betrays him by giving him a briefcase of blank notes and hitmen arrive to take down Ah Jong in his own home. Ah Jong kills his attackers, but spares Sei out of loyalty. The next day, Ah Jong attempts to kill Wong Hoi in a drive-by shooting but, fails. Wong Hoi hires hitman Frank Chen to kill Ah Jong. Jennie is persuaded to help the police set a trap for Ah Jong at the airport, but Sei distracts them while Ah Jong flees with Jennie. Tsang follows Sei to his house where Ah Jong and Jennie are hiding, but gets fatally wounded by Chen's gang and dies in the hospital moments after sharing his discovery with Li.

Li goes to arrest Ah Jong, but winds up helping him and Jennie fight their way out of an ambush. Ah Jong and Li flee, and while Ah Jong's wounds are mended, they find themselves bonding and becoming friends. Ah Jong makes Li promise that should anything happen to him, he will make sure that Jennie has her operation. Li, Ah Jong, and Jennie take refuge in a church while Sei goes to get Ah Jong's money from Hoi. Sei is badly beaten after trying to shoot Hoi and sustains several mortal gunshot wounds, but manages to get the money to the church. Ah Jong shoots Sei to end his suffering, and he and Li arm themselves before engaging in a bloody shootout with dozens of gangsters.

Li and Ah Jong are wounded, and eventually find themselves in a Mexican standoff between Ah Jong, Li, and Hoi. Hoi holds a gun to Jennie's head and shoots Chen dead when Li takes him hostage. Ah Jong has his eyes shot out, and bleeds to death as Jennie, now completely blind, crawls around helplessly trying to find him. As the police arrive, Hoi immediately surrenders, but an enraged Li kills him promptly during the process of his arrest. For disobeying the law by murdering Hoi after he had surrendered, Li is surrounded by the police, and he collapses to the ground in despair at the loss of his friend.

== Cast ==
- Chow Yun-fat as Ah Jong (Chinese: 阿莊; Jyutping: aa3 zong1; pinyin: ā zhuāng), an assassin who accidentally blinds singer Jennie when he is on a mission for the triads. Ah Jong decides to take on one last mission to pay for surgery to repair her eyes. Ah Jong is called "John" or "Jeff" in some subtitled prints of the film. The nickname given to Ah Jong by Li is "Har Tau", which roughly translates as "shrimp head." In some dubbed and subtitled prints, his nickname is "Mickey Mouse" or "Butthead".
- Danny Lee as Detective Li Ying (李鷹; lei5 jing1; lǐ yīng). Li works with his partner Tsang to find Ah Jong. After his first meeting with him, Li becomes obsessed with Ah Jong's morals and character. The nickname given to Li by Ah Jong is "Ah B" which roughly translates as "baby" or "kid". In some dubbed and subtitled prints, his nickname is "Dumbo" or "Numbnuts".
- Sally Yeh as Jennie (珍妮; zan1 nei4; zhēn nī), a nightclub singer who is blinded by Ah Jong in a shootout. Jennie falls in love with Ah Jong, before learning of his profession as a killer.
- Kenneth Tsang as Sgt. Tsang Yeh (曾爺; cang4 je4; zēng yé), Li's police partner and only sympathizer. Tsang helps find the whereabouts of Fung Sei that lead Li to Ah Jong before getting killed by the triads. In some subtitled prints, his name is "Randy Chang".
- Chu Kong as Fung Sei, Ah Jong's oldest friend and "manager"; he previously worked as an assassin himself before suffering a hand injury that ended his career. In some subtitled prints, his name is "Sidney Fong".
- Shing Fui-on as Wong Hoi (汪海; wong1 hoi2; wāng hǎi), a ruthless triad boss who tries to kill Ah Jong after hiring him to kill his uncle. Both Ah Jong and Fung Sei consider him a symbol of the triads losing their honor. In some subtitled versions he is "Johnny Weng."
- Ricky Yi Fan-wai as Frank Chen, a contract killer/assassin hired by Wong Hoi to kill Ah Jong. In some versions he is "Paul Yau."
- Barry Wong as Chief Inspector Dou, Detective Li's police superior.

== Themes ==
Director John Woo has described The Killer as being about "honour and friendship", "trying to find out if there is something common between two people" and as a "romantic poem". The structure of the film follows two men on opposite sides of the law who find a relation to each other in their opposition to a greater evil, Wong Hoi, a Triad boss. Li and Ah Jong's relationship was influenced by the Spy vs. Spy comics from Mad Magazine. Woo recalled "When I was young I was fascinated with the cartoon–I love it very much ... the white bird and the black bird are always against each other, but deep in their heart, they are still friendly, and the idea came from that." Woo uses Ah Jong and Li as a central motif to illustrate moral points. Scenes with this reflective doubling include the hospital sequence with Li and Ah Jong on opposite sides of a hospital hall and in the final battle scene where Li and Ah Jong are in a standoff with Wong. The focus on male friendships in Woo's film have been interpreted as homoerotic. Woo has responded to these statements stating "People will bring their own preconceptions to a movie .... If they see something in The Killer that they consider to be homoerotic then that is their privilege. It's certainly not intentional."

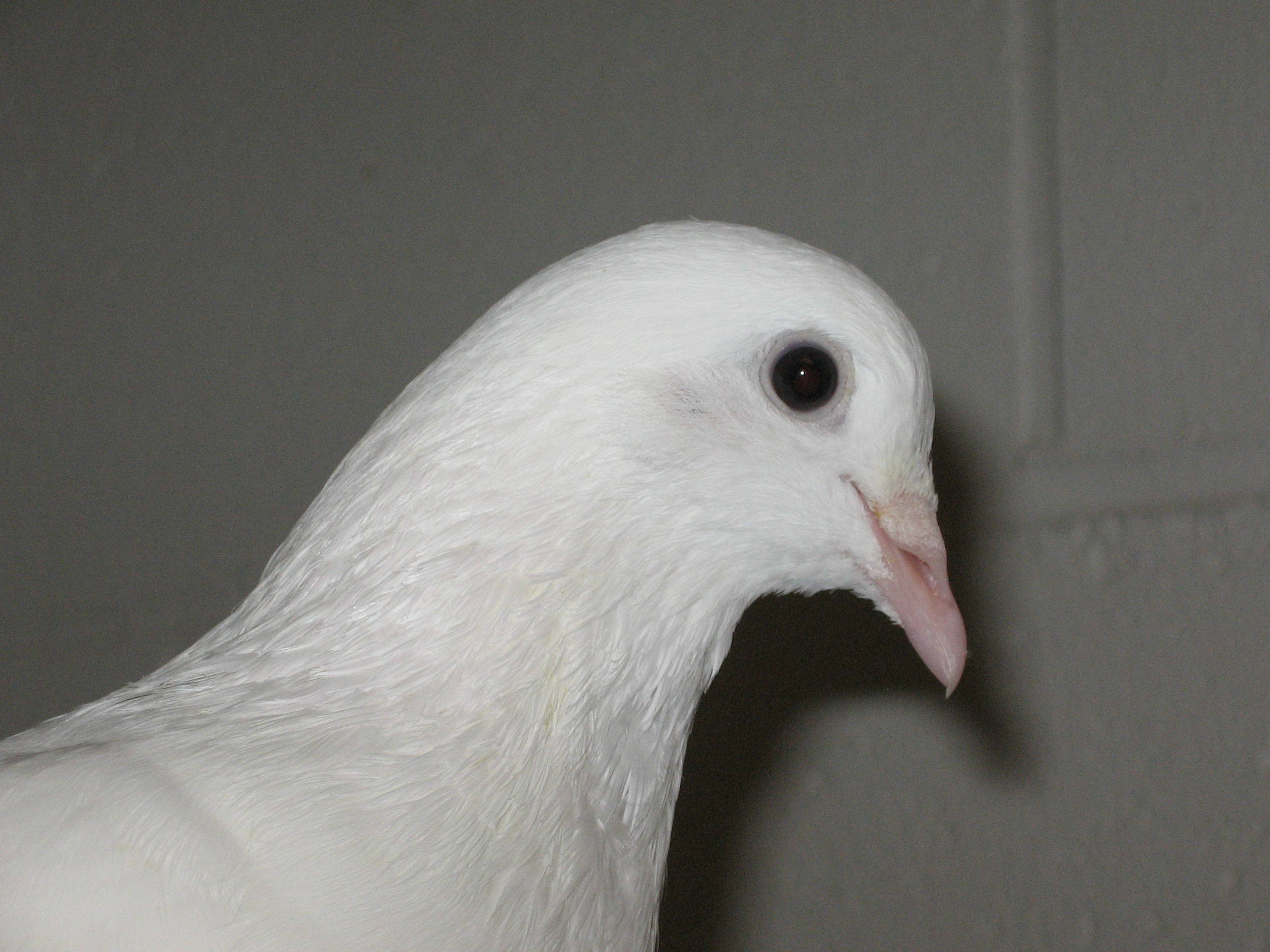
Woo's recurring symbol of white doves was first used in The Killer

Woo is a Christian and instills his films with religious imagery while stating that The Killer is "not a religious film". In the opening of The Killer, Ah Jong is found in a church stating he enjoys the "tranquility". Ah Jong is later found in the church again getting several slugs pulled out of his back showing his intense pain while the altar and cross are shown prominently behind him. The idea was influenced by Martin Scorsese's film Mean Streets, Woo stated the imagery was used to show that "God is welcoming, no matter if it's a good or a bad man, everyone is welcome".

Woo draws on animal symbolism throughout the film. He filled the church with doves and pigeons, employing doves to represent the spirits of the people. This was the first film in which Woo used the dove symbolism that he would later use for a similar effect in Hard Target and Face/Off. A cat appears when Ah Jong first meets Jennie on her visit home, and secondarily when Li's partner Tsang tries to catch Ah Jong in Jennie's apartment. In Chinese culture, a cat coming into a home is an omen of ruin and poverty for its inhabitants. Both Tsang and Jennie meet negative outcomes in the film.

== Production ==
=== Pre-production ===
The Killer was director Woo's follow-up to A Better Tomorrow 2 which was released in 1987. The first cut of A Better Tomorrow 2 was too long for the studio so the film was edited within a week separately by both producer Tsui Hark and Woo. According to producer Terence Chang, Tsui Hark felt that John Woo ruined A Better Tomorrow 2 and asked Chang to fire Woo from the studio. When Chang refused, Hark began rejecting Woo's new film ideas, including ideas for films that would later be made, such as Bullet in the Head and Once a Thief. When Woo proposed the story of The Killer to Tsui Hark, it was denied; Hark's reaction was that "[n]obody wants to see a film about a killer".

=== Casting ===
The Killer was not able to be filmed until actor Chow Yun-fat stepped in and enlisted the company he was contracted with, Golden Princess Film, to fund part of the project. Chow had worked previously with Woo on the two A Better Tomorrow films. Woo wanted Danny Lee to play Li Ying, but Lee was under an exclusive contract with Cinema City and was only able to work on The Killer if his production company, Magnum, was involved. John Woo approached his friend, Sally Yeh, asking her to be in a film to play an important female character. Yeh was currently contracted with Tsui Hark and accepted the role but later felt she did not give her best performance. The supporting roles were filled out by friends of the actors and director. Chu Kong was a friend of Chow Yun-fat who had entered retirement and returned to acting in The Killer as a favor. Two of Woo's close friends joined the cast: actor Kenneth Tsang and screenwriter Barry Wong. Wong Wing-Hang was hired to be the director of photography for The Killer but had to leave the set for an extended period of time, so Peter Pau was added to shoot the rest of the film.

=== Filming ===
Woo had over 90 days to shoot The Killer which was nearly double the amount of time that the average Hong Kong film was shot in the late 1980s. Woo went into filming with only a short treatment for the film and wrote the details of the script while filming. During promotion periods for the film, Woo described the film as a tribute to Martin Scorsese and French director Jean-Pierre Melville. Woo cites Melville's Le Samouraï as an influence on the story. Woo borrows plot elements for the film, including the set-up where Jef enters a nightclub and looks at the female singer. Woo also described the influence of a Japanese film, Narazumono, about a killer (Ken Takakura) who only kills delinquents. When a mob tricks him into killing an innocent person, he swears revenge but then meets a woman who has tuberculosis and wants to go home. The killer promises the woman that he will take her home after getting his revenge.

The scene where Danny Lee chases a gunman onto a tram was filmed in Causeway Bay and the crew only had three hours to film. Residents thought it was a real gunfight and phoned the police. However, when the police arrived, Danny Lee talked to the superintendent so they could continue filming. Scenes from the Dragon Boat festival were shot months apart, some footage was of the boat races and rest of the footage involving the actors was shot months later. It was planned for the boats to flip over during the chase, but the owners refused because they felt it would bring bad luck. The scene at the airport were filmed at the Kai Tak Airport. The scenes at Paul Chu Kong's character's house were filmed in Stanley, Hong Kong. John Woo wanted this house to be by a beach, but a suitable location could not be found. The action scene inside the house took 28 days to shoot. The final action scene took 36 days to shoot and was shot at a remote building made to look like a church while the exterior seen from Ah Jong's apartment is a real church. The original ending of the film involved Jennie waiting at an airport for Li to give her the money and for them to travel to the United States. Due to Sally Yeh's tight filming schedule, the scene was not filmed and replaced with Ah Jong playing the harmonica.

== Music ==
Tsui and Woo disagreed on the musical aspects of the film. For the opening scene, Woo wanted the singer to perform a jazz song and have the killer playing a saxophone. Tsui rejected this idea as he felt that the Hong Kong audiences did not understand or like jazz. Woo stated that he "had to change it to a Chinese song, the kind of song they always use in Hong Kong movies." Actress Sally Yeh who performed the Cantopop songs did not feel they were appropriate for the film. The songs were requested by the studio and written specifically for The Killer.

The film score was composed by Lowell Lo and edited by David Wu. A recurring motif is a haunting vibraphone theme which is first heard over the opening credits. The harmonica motif in the film was influenced by the soundtracks of Ennio Morricone, specifically the soundtrack to Once Upon a Time in America, and used a bottle blower to give the music a haunting effect. David Wu said the harmonica music in Sergio Leone's western films was a strong influence on his work. During the final action scene when the statue of the Virgin Mary is destroyed, the action music transitions to "Overture" from Messiah by George Frideric Handel. This was the idea of editor David Wu who felt that it would break up the numbing effect of the kinetic violence.

== Release ==
The Killer was first released in Taiwan in March 1989 with a running time of 124 minutes. It was then cut to its current running time of 110 minutes and released in Hong Kong on 6 July 1989, Woo felt this cut was "much better". The film was not an immediate success in Hong Kong due to the Tiananmen Square massacre but eventually gained fame, grossing $18,255,083 and reached ninth at the 1989 Hong Kong box office. At the 9th Hong Kong Film Awards, the film won for Best Director (John Woo) and Best Editing (Fan Kung Ming) and was also nominated for Best Picture, Best Supporting Actor (Paul Chu Kong), Best Screenplay (Woo) and Best Cinematography (Wong Wing Hang and Peter Pau). The Killer was popular in Korea taking seventh highest place in the year end box office receipts.

The Killer was shown at several film festivals outside Asia including the 1989 Toronto Festival of Festivals and, during the film's United States premiere, at the Palm Springs International Film Festival in January 1990. It was also shown at the Sundance Film Festival in the United States and the Cannes Film Festival in France in 1990. Film producer Terence Chang suggested that The Killer's success around the world made several Hong Kong filmmakers jealous: "It created a certain kind of resentment in the Hong Kong film industry. One thing I can say for sure is, the American, European, Japanese, Korean and even the Taiwanese audiences and critics appreciated The Killer a lot more than it was in Hong Kong." The Killer received a wide release in the United Kingdom on 8 October 1993.

=== Home media ===
The Killer was released in the United States on VHS by Fox Lorber in November 1992, in a dubbed and subtitled version. In 1993, The Criterion Collection issued a director's cut version of the film on LaserDisc that included audio commentary from Woo and Chang. On 25 June 1996 Fox Lorber released The Killer along with Hard Boiled as a double feature on home video. The Killer was released on DVD by The Criterion Collection on 1 April 1998 in the original Cantonese language track with English subtitles. Bonus features on DVD included the trailer, production notes, and a commentary track. Woo was very happy with the film being included in the Criterion Collection stating, "it was great because it would let people know what [The Killer and Hard Boiled] are about...when I saw that Criterion Collection selected The Killer, I was very happy as The Killer and Bullet in the Head are my two favourites".

On 3 October 2000, Fox Lorber released a DVD of The Killer. This Fox Lorber disc was also included in a two disc DVD collection with Hard Boiled but both the Fox Lorber and Criterion DVDs went out of print. In the United Kingdom, The Killer was released on DVD by Hong Kong Legends on 21 October 2002 which included an audio commentary with Bey Logan and interviews with Kenneth Tsang, Sally Yeh and cinematographer Peter Pau.

On 30 March 2010 The Killer was released by the Dragon Dynasty label on two-disc DVD and Blu-ray.

== Reception ==
=== Critical response ===
On review aggregator Rotten Tomatoes, the film has an approval rating of 96% based on 45 reviews by critics. Its critical consensus reads, "The Killer is another hard-boiled action flick from John Woo featuring eye-popping balletic violence and philosophical underpinnings." Metacritic, which uses a weighted average, assigned the film a score of 82 out of 100, based on 19 critics, indicating "universal acclaim".

Stephen Holden of The New York Times referred to the film as "Alternately gripping and laughable" and that "The scenes of gore and destruction are even more spectacular than Hong Kong's fog-shrouded skyline". Variety gave a positive review, describing the film as an "extremely violent and superbly made actioner demonstrates the tight grasp that director John Woo has on the crime meller genre". Kathleen Maher of The Austin Chronicle praised the film stating that it "defies all categorization but demands comparisons, if only to prove that there's never been anything like this before." Hal Hinson of The Washington Post wrote a positive review, describing the film as "like eating popcorn, but it's not just any old brand; it's escape-velocity popcorn, popcorn with a slurp of rocket fuel...[Woo's] ideas overreach themselves with such a virile swagger that they border on comedy. With excess like this you can't help but laugh. This is a rush of a movie".

Later critiques of the film remained positive. The Washington Post stated that "the plot doesn't exactly break new crime-story ground. It's all the Woo flourishes...that elevates The Killer to another level". Lucia Bozzola of the online film database Allmovie gave the film a five star rating, and stated it as "One of the high points of 1980s Hong Kong action cinema". Empire gave the film five stars and proclaimed that "John Woo's trademark style reached its zenith in The Killer". In 2010, Time Out New York ranked The Killer at number 50 on their list of the top 50 foreign films of all time. In 2014, Time Out polled several film critics, directors, actors and stunt actors to list their top action films. The Killer was listed at 24th place on this list.

=== Legacy ===
I went to the movies to see John Woo's The Killer. Damn. I wish we had more money for squib effects (bullet hits).

— Director Robert Rodriguez before production on El Mariachi (1992)

The Killer has been recognized as an important and influential film for both Western and Asian filmmakers. Film scholars have noted the similarities between Woo's style and The Killer with the films Nikita (1990) and Léon (1994) directed by French director Luc Besson. Kenneth E. Hall described Léon as having the similar character configuration of a hitman and the person he protects. In Nikita, the main character's crisis of conscience after performing a number of hits is also seen in The Killer. Lucy Mazdon described the style of Nikita as recalling "the work of directors like John Woo. Like Nikita, Woo's films show alienated and often brutal characters and graphic violence". In the United States, directors Robert Rodriguez and Quentin Tarantino developed films that were influenced by The Killer. Rodriguez's films El Mariachi (1992), Desperado (1995), & Once Upon a Time in Mexico (2003) contain stylistic homages to The Killer. In writing the script for Jackie Brown, Tarantino added dialog referencing The Killer that were not present in the source novel. Asian-based directors were also influenced by the film. Hong Kong director Johnnie To borrows from The Killer's gunfighting style, oppositional character pairing, and parody in his films A Hero Never Dies, Running Out of Time, and Fulltime Killer.

The Killer was also influential on hip hop music. American hip hop artist, and Wu-Tang Clan member Raekwon released his critically praised debut album Only Built 4 Cuban Linx... (1995) that sampled numerous portions of dialog from the film. RZA, the producer of the album described the album's themes by stating that "Rae and Ghost was two opposite guys as far as neighborhoods was concerned, I used John Woo's The Killer. [In that movie] you got Chow Yun Fat [playing the role of Ah Jong] and Danny Lee [Inspector Li]. They have to become partners to work shit out." Woo felt honored that the group sampled The Killer and asked for no monetary return from them. In 2005, Vibe magazine placed The Killer at number 21 on their list of top fifty films that shaped hip hop.

== Accolades ==
Accolades
| Ceremony | Category | Recipient | Outcome |
|---|---|---|---|
| 9th Hong Kong Film Awards | Best Film | | Nominated |
| 9th Hong Kong Film Awards | Best Director | John Woo | Won |
| 9th Hong Kong Film Awards | Best Screenplay | John Woo | Nominated |
| 9th Hong Kong Film Awards | Best Supporting Actor | Paul Chu Kong | Nominated |
| 9th Hong Kong Film Awards | Best Film Editing | Fan Kung Wing | Won |
| 9th Hong Kong Film Awards | Best Cinematography | Wing Hung Wong and Peter Pau | Nominated |

== Remake ==
In 1992, American filmmaker Walter Hill and David Giler wrote a screenplay for Tri-Star Pictures titled The Killer that was dated 6 April 1992. The press release of this remake stated the script was written for actors Richard Gere and Denzel Washington. In June 1992, it was announced Walter Hill and Giler were writing a script titled Hong Kong based on The Killer with Hill directing. The producers had difficulty with the relationship between two main characters in the script as they felt that American audiences would interpret it as a homoerotic one. Producer Terence Chang, who worked with Woo on several productions, suggested to the American producers to have Hong Kong actress Michelle Yeoh play the role of the police officer to resolve any homoerotic reading of the film. A year later, screenwriters Jim Cash and Jack Epps, Jr. were hired by producers Charles Roven and Robert Cavallo to write a screenplay based on The Killer for Tristar, in which they wrote a third draft of the script was that was dated on 23 August 1993 which featured a story of a Caucasian hitman living in Hong Kong. This screenplay moved the focus from the pairing the hit man and the police detective characters to the characters of blinded night club singer and the hit man.

In October 2007, The Hollywood Reporter announced that a remake of The Killer was announced with Korean-American director John H. Lee directing. The remake would take place in Los Angeles's Koreatown, Chinatown, and South Central. Lee named The Killer as one of his favorite films and that he was excited to make his own version of the film. Lee's version was set to be produced by Woo, and star Jung Woo-sung and shot in 3D. Seven Stars Film Studios was slated to finance the production with a screenplay by Josh Campbell. Sarah Li was initially cast to play the role of the blind singer. Woo spoke about the remake in October 2015, stating that Lee's film was in development for some time and Lee eventually took on other projects.

Woo commented in 2015 that he would return to Hollywood after filming Manhunt (2017) in order to make an American adaptation of The Killer. Universal Pictures was announced to be developing the film with a script written by Eran Creevy based on drafts by Josh Campbell and Matt Stuecken, with additional contributions by Brian Helgeland. Actress Lupita Nyong'o had been cast for the lead role. Woo said that filming would begin in January 2019. About the decision of flip both the gender and race of the lead, Nyong'o remarked that she "did not see it coming, either", stating that she had received, read and liked the script without having seen the original movie. However, Woo told Deadline in November 2019 that Nyong'o had left the film due to scheduling conflicts as a result of a script rewrite. In May 2022, it was announced that the film will be directed by Woo, produced by Universal and released exclusively on Peacock. In August 2022, Universal announced that Omar Sy would lead the film as the cop character. In March 2023, Nathalie Emmanuel was cast as the lead role. Woo returned to work on The Killer following a multi-month hiatus on shooting the film in Paris shoot due to the 2023 SAG-AFTRA strike. The film was released on August 23, 2024.

== See also ==
- Chow Yun-fat filmography
- Hong Kong films of 1989
- List of action films of the 1980s
- List of crime films of the 1980s
- List of cult films
