= The Chinese Feast =

1995 Hong Kong film by Tsui Hark

- DVD cover
- Directed by: Tsui Hark
- Written by: Philip Cheng; Ng Man-Fai; Tsui Hark; Yuen Kai-Chi
- Produced by: Tsui Hark; Raymond Wong; Lee Ling
- Starring: Leslie Cheung; Anita Yuen; Kenny Bee; Law Kar-ying
- Cinematography: Peter Pau; Hang Sang Poon
- Edited by: Marco Mak
- Music by: Lowell Lo
- Production company: Film Workshop
- Distributed by: Mandarin Films Ltd.
- Release dates: 28 January 1995 (Hong Kong); 28 January 1998 (France)
- Running time: 100 mins
- Country: Hong Kong
- Language: Cantonese
- Box office: HK$31,117,576

The Chinese Feast (Chinese: 金玉滿堂) is a 1995 Hong Kong film co-written, produced and directed by Tsui Hark, and starring Leslie Cheung, Anita Yuen, Kenny Bee, and Law Kar-ying.

== Synopsis ==
Kit was a master chef who once raked in many accolades as being the finest Chinese cook. An elite cooking competition had placed him enviably in front of many aspiring colleagues and he seemed to have the world at his feet. However, the competition placed him in a dilemma of conflicting interests of heart - his own craft or the woman whom he loves.

His obsession (and persistently stubborn attitude) with his work confirmed that he did not appear to hold his girlfriend in a special regard. She was about to give birth to their child, at the same time he was about to participate in an important and prestigious cooking contest. She dumped him for disregarding the relationship. Realising that a successful career can only be shared with a significant other, Kit turned bitter. He became an alcoholic, traumatized by the separation. Five years later, his career diminished and he was quickly forgotten. To further compound problems, his sense of taste appeared to have left him due to his constant drunken state, and he became cranky and unsociable.

Elsewhere, a popular Chinese restaurant in Hong Kong owned by Au was approached by an organisation 'Super Group' who wished to merge all major Chinese restaurants into a powerful group to eliminate all opposition in Asia. Au protested and the Super Group supremo throws down a challenge to cook the legendary Manchu Han Imperial Feast, where the loser would be absorbed into the Super Group indefinitely. Au's employees were poached over to 'Super Group', being promised that they will own a share of the restaurant and better salary if Au loses the challenge.

Au then enlists the assistance of a former triad member, a rookie chef named Sun who aspires to be a top chef, and had worked at Au's restaurant wishing to shed his criminal past together with Au's daughter Wai. After several foiled attempts at preparing even a simple dish, they realise the futility of their initial efforts as the Feast could only be accomplished by a master chef and their limited cooking skills would be of no use if they were to save their establishment.

They seek the help of Lung Kwun-bo, a master chef, but he did not know how to cook the Imperial Feast. Lung recommended them to seek Kit in China to engage his service to cook in the challenge. After meeting Kit and verifying that his skills are gone, Lung got both of them to find his wife to wake Kit up. Kit and his wife reunited after some persuasion. With the assistance of Lung, Sun and Wai managed to stimulate Kit's skills back.

During the tournament, the contestants prepared rare and luxurious dishes. Kit was able to recapture his previous glories and ultimately saved Au's restaurant after a closely fought contest. The movie would eventually end on a happy note as is the theme of all Lunar New Year movies.

== Cast and roles ==
Sources:

- Leslie Cheung - Chiu Kong-Sun (a former triad member chef)
- Amy Fan Yik Man - Sun's former girlfriend
- Kenny Bee - Kit (a deposed master-chef relied upon to save the restaurant)
- Law Kar-ying - Au (restaurateur battling to save his restaurant from a merger)
- Anita Yuen - Ka Wai (Au's daughter who cannot cook and is a playful, zany girl)
- Vincent Zhao - Lung Kwun-bo
- Xiong Xin-Xin
- Raymond Wong
- Joyce Ngai
- William Ho
- Wong Yat-Fei

== See also ==
- Eat Drink Man Woman
- The God of Cookery
- Osaka Wrestling Restaurant
- The Banquet (1991)
- The Wedding Banquet
