= Beyond the Sunset (film) =

1989 Hong Kong film by Jacob Cheung

Beyond the Sunset 飛越黃昏
- Film poster
- Directed by: Jacob Cheung
- Written by: Chan Kam Cheong; Jacob Cheung
- Produced by: Barry Chung Man Keung
- Starring: Fung Bo Bo; Lowell Lo; Richard Ng; Cecilia Yip
- Cinematography: Lee Kin-Keung
- Edited by: Chang Shao-Hsi
- Music by: Chan Wing-leung
- Production company: Dream Factory Film Co.
- Release date: July 5, 1989 (Hong Kong)
- Running time: 115 minutes
- Country: Hong Kong
- Language: Cantonese

Beyond the Sunset (Chinese: 飛越黃昏) is a 1989 film by Hong Kong director Jacob Cheung.

== Cast and roles ==
- Fung Bo Bo - May
- Law Chi Wai
- Lowell Lo - Allen
- Richard Ng - Wong
- Alexander Roels - Derek
- Cecilia Yip - Pearl
- Fung So-Po
- Hui Ying-Sau

== Awards ==
It won Best Film, Best Screenplay and Best Supporting Actress at the 9th Hong Kong Film Awards.
