= The Bachelor's Swan Song =

1989 Hong Kong film by Derek Yee

- Film poster
- Traditional Chinese: 再見王老五
- Hanyu Pinyin: Zai4 Jian4 Wang2 Lao3 Wu3
- Directed by: Derek Yee
- Written by: Derek Yee; Wong Ji Yat
- Produced by: Sammo Hung; Chan Pooi Wa
- Starring: Kenny Bee; Maggie Cheung; Lydia Shum; Meg Lam; Lawrence Cheng
- Cinematography: Wilson Chan Pui Ka
- Edited by: Ma Chung Yiu
- Music by: Richard Yuen Cheuk Fan
- Production companies: Bo Ho Film Company Ltd. Mobile Film Production; Paragon Films Ltd.
- Distributed by: Golden Harvest Company
- Release date: 18 March 1989 (Hong Kong)
- Running time: 103 minutes
- Country: Hong Kong
- Language: Cantonese
- Box office: HK$7.938 million

The Bachelor's Swan Song is a 1989 Hong Kong movie directed and co-written by Derek Yee.

== Cast ==
- Kenny Bee as Chan Chi-Nam
- Maggie Cheung as Cheung Yuk
- Lydia Shum as Yuk's Mother
- Meg Lam as Ming
- Lawrence Cheng as Tan

== Awards and nominations ==
Nominated – Hong Kong Film Award for Best Screenplay at the 9th Hong Kong Film Awards
