= The Perfect Match (1991 film) =

1991 Hong Kong film by Stephen Shin

- 富貴吉祥
- Directed by: Stephen Shin
- Written by: Tony Leung Hung-Wah; Lam Tan-Ping; Lam Wai Lun
- Produced by: Norman Chan
- Starring: George Lam; Maggie Cheung; Jacky Cheung; Vivian Chow
- Cinematography: Lee Kin Keung
- Edited by: Cheung Kwok Kuen; Wong Wing-ming
- Music by: Danny Chung; Tang Siu-Lam
- Release date: 1991
- Running time: 86 min
- Country: Hong Kong
- Language: Cantonese
- Box office: HK$ 13.49 M.

The Perfect Match (富貴吉祥) is a 1991 Hong Kong film directed by Stephen Shin.

== Cast ==
- George Lam as Koo
- Maggie Cheung as Carrie Kam
- Jacky Cheung as Jacky Kam
- Vivian Chow as Philidonna
- Dennis Chan
- Chan Man-Ho as Madonna's Maid
- Cheng Chi-Gong
- Cheng Chi-Keung
- Cheng Pak Lam
- Hau Woon Ling
- Benz Hui as Koo's Manager
- Tony Leung Hung-Wah
- Cynthia Khan as Philidonna's Cousin
- Lai Bei-Dak
- Lam Chi-wah
- Brenda Lo
- Lydia Shum as Madonna
- Sin Gam-Ching
- Tse Wai-Kit
- Wong Kim-Ching
- Manfred Wong
- Yip Hon Leung
- Kingdom Yuen as Manager's Assistant
