= My Heart Is That Eternal Rose =

1989 Hong Kong film by Patrick Tam

- Film poster
- Directed by: Patrick Tam
- Written by: Chan Koonchung; Tsang Kan-cheung
- Produced by: John Sham
- Starring: Kenny Bee; Joey Wong; Tony Leung Chiu-wai
- Cinematography: David Chung; Christopher Doyle
- Edited by: Cheung Kwok-kuen
- Music by: Danny Chung
- Production company: Maverick Film Ltd.
- Distributed by: Newport Entertainment
- Release date: 20 April 1989
- Running time: 90 minutes
- Country: Hong Kong
- Language: Cantonese
- Box office: HK$3.1 million

My Heart Is That Eternal Rose (simplified Chinese: 杀手蝴蝶梦; traditional Chinese: 殺手蝴蝶夢; lit. 'Butterfly Dream Killer') is a 1989 Hong Kong film that blends action, romance, crime, and thriller elements. Directed by Patrick Tam, it stars Kenny Bee, Joey Wong, and Tony Leung Chiu-wai.

== Plot ==
Rick Ma kills a police officer to help his lover Lap, then flees from Hong Kong to the Philippines, where he becomes a professional hitman. Later, he is hired to return to Hong Kong to assassinate a key witness, and unexpectedly reunites with Lap.

Earlier, Lap's father had been kidnapped by a triad gang. She sought help from a crime boss known as Shen to rescue him, but in return was forced to become his mistress. Later, Shen's driver, Cheung, helps Lap escape. As a result, he and Rick Ma both become targets of Shen's pursuit.

During their escape, Rick Ma and Cheung become friends and, together with Lap, form a central love triangle that drives the story. In the final gun battle with Shen, only one of them survives.

== Cast ==
- Kenny Bee as Rick Ma
- Joey Wong as Lap
- Tony Leung Chiu-wai as Cheung
- Michael Chan as Shen
- Cheung Tat-ming as Law Man-shing's Son
- Gam Lui as Law Man-shing
- Kwan Hoi-san as Uncle Cheung
- Gordon Liu as Lai Liu
- Ng Man-tat as Inspector Tang

== Release ==
My Heart is That Eternal Rose was released on April 20, 1989. The film grossed a total of $3.1 million Hong Kong dollars. In 2024, the independent art-house cinema Metrograph screened My Heart Is That Eternal Rose in the United States for the first time.

== Awards ==
Award	Date of ceremony	Category	Recipient(s)	Result	Ref.
Hong Kong Film Awards	8 April 1990	Best Supporting Actor	Tony Leung Chiu-wai	Won	
Hong Kong Film Awards	8 April 1990	Best Art Direction	Patrick Tam, Eddie Mok	Nominated	
Hong Kong Film Awards	8 April 1990	Best Editing	Kwok-Kuen Cheung	Nominated	
