= Kenny Bee =

Hong Kong singer and actor

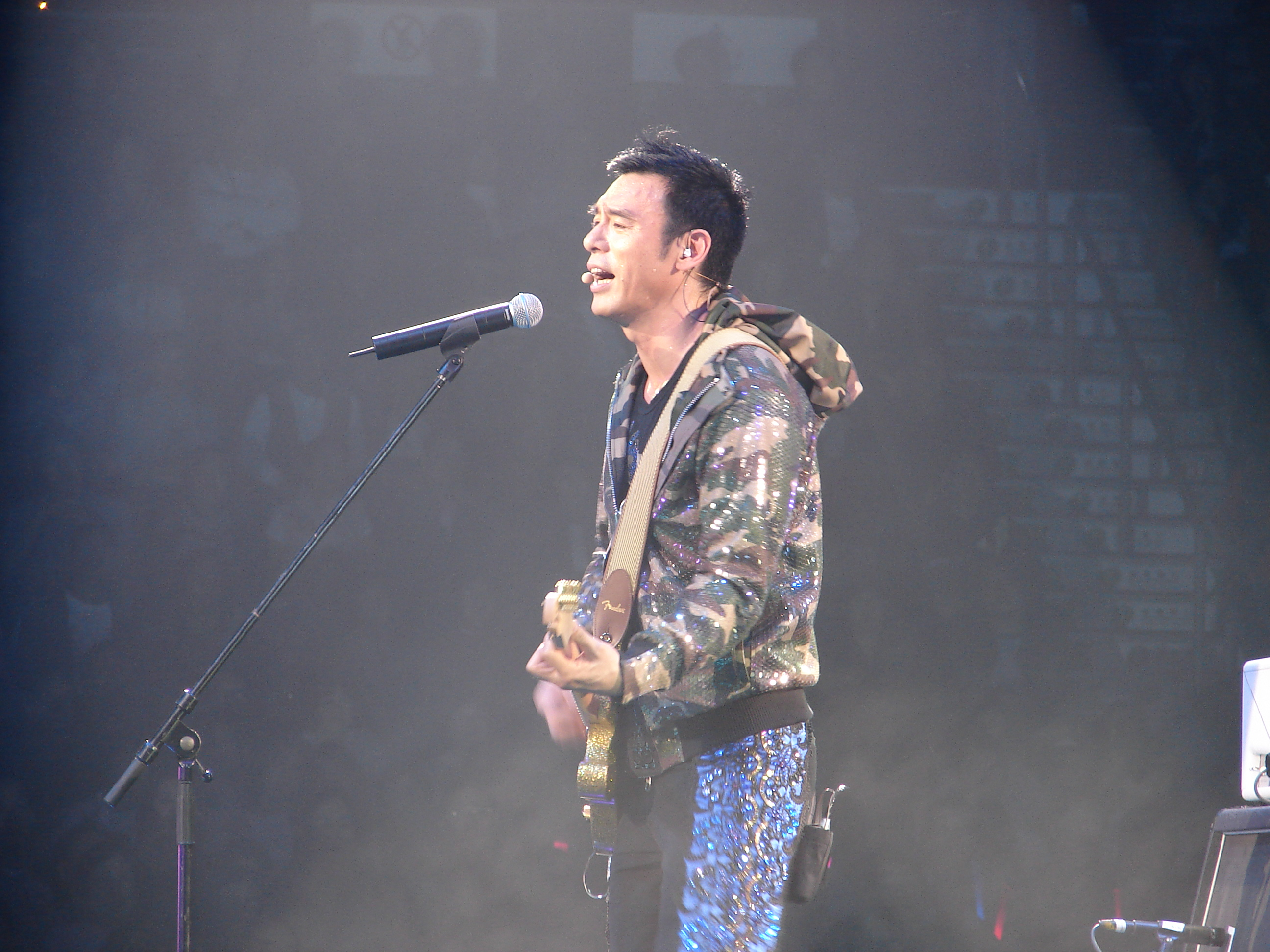
- Bee in 2007
- Born: Chung Chun-to; 23 February 1953 (age 73); British Hong Kong
- Occupations: Musician; singer; songwriter; actor
- Years active: 1973–present
- Spouses: Teresa Cheung (m. 1988; div. 1999) Fan-jiang Su-zhen (m. 2014)
- Children: 4

Chinese name
- Traditional Chinese: 鍾鎮濤
- Simplified Chinese: 钟镇涛
Transcriptions
Standard Mandarin
- Hanyu Pinyin: Zhōng Zhèntāo
Yue: Cantonese
- Jyutping: Zung1 Zan3tou4
- Musical career
- Genres: Cantopop, Mandopop, Hong Kong English pop
- Instruments: Vocals; keyboards; guitar; saxophone

Chung Chun-to (born 23 February 1953), also known as Kenny Bee, is a Hong Kong singer and actor. He rose to fame as the frontman of the Wynners, with whom he won the Golden Needle Award, the highest honor in Hong Kong music, in 1989. He received the award again in 2016 as a solo artist.

== Career ==
Bee made his break into the Hong Kong entertainment industry in 1973 as a member of the popular 1970s band, the Wynners (溫拿樂隊), sharing vocal duties with Alan Tam. Before joining the Wynners, he was a vocalist and saxophonist on the Hong Kong nightclub circuit, and briefly fronted a band called the Sergeant Majors.

=== Acting ===
As members of the Wynners went their separate ways in 1978, Bee embarked on a solo career as an actor in Taiwan, playing lead roles in a number of romantic movies, including The Story of a Small Town, (directed by Li Hsing, 1979), Good Morning, Taipei (directed by Li Hsing, 1979), both of which won the Golden Horse Award, and The Green, Green Grass of Home (directed by Hou Hsiao-hsien, 1983).

In the eighties Bee returned to Hong Kong, and has since amassed a large number of movie credits, mainly in romantic comedies. Career highlights include "Let's Make Laugh" (directed by Alfred Cheung, 1983), "Shanghai Blues" (directed by Tsui Hark, 1984), "Fist of Fury 1991" (with Stephen Chow, 1991), "the Chinese Feast" (directed by Tsui Hark, 1995) and "Initial D" (directed by Andrew Lau and Alan Mak, 2005). In addition, he was credited as the director for "100 Ways to Murder Your Wife" (starring himself, Chow Yun-fat and Anita Mui, 1986).

=== Musicianship ===
Bee has released over fifty studio and compilation albums to date, in Cantonese, Mandarin and English. The 1980s marked the peak of Bee's popularity with the Hong Kong audience so far, during which four of his studio albums went gold and two went platinum. Notable hits from this period include "Let Everything Be Gone With the Wind" (讓一切隨風), "If We Were Meant To Be" (要是有緣), "Red Leaves Fell As I Feel Lonesome" (紅葉斜落我心寂寞時), which was the Cantonese cover of Right Here Waiting by Richard Marx, and "A Romance" (一段情).

Known for a distinct, husky voice, the singer penned most of his own hits and plays multiple instruments. In the early days he was often seen on stage with keyboards or a saxophone. In recent performances he usually accompanies himself with a guitar.

Bee released his latest Cantonese solo album, Escape (濤出新天), in December 2006, backed by his new band Black Tea.

Bee partnered with violin luthier Scott Cao to design their own line of classical guitars, "Bonstar." In 2008, Bee performed a series of solo concerts at the Hong Kong Coliseum, as well as in Singapore and Macau. Aside from working solo, the Wynners continued their world tour.

== Personal life ==
Bee has a blood brother and six half brothers and sisters. He married socialite Teresa Cheung in 1988, with whom he had a son, Nicholas Bee, and a daughter, Chloe Bee. The marriage ended in a high-profile and acrimonious divorce in 1999. Bee filed for personal bankruptcy in 2002, which expired on 17 October 2006.

His second wife is Fan-Chiang Su-zhen, with whom he married in 2014. They have two daughters, Chung Yee (Blythe), born in 2004, and Chung Kwok (Eloise), born in 2010.

In December 2007, Bee released an autobiography, MacDonnell Road, named after a street in Hong Kong he grew up on.

== Filmography ==
=== Film and television ===
Year	Title	Role	Notes
1975	Let's Rock		
1976	Gonna Get You		
1977	Rainbow in My Heart		
1977	Chelsia, My Love		
1978	Making It		
1979	The Story of a Small Town		
1979	Good Morning, Taipei		
1979	All's Well that Does Well		
1980	Sai Fung Dik Ku Heung		
1980	The Spooky Bunch		
1980	Cute Girl		aka Lovable You
1980	Don't Forget the Promise		
1980	Spring in Autumn		
1980	Burning Love		
1980	Love Comes from the Sea		
1981	Errant Love		
1981	My Cape of Many Dreams		
1981	Another Spring		aka Once Again with Love
1981	Bang Bang Yat Chun Sam		
1981	The Funniest Movie		
1981	Undated Wedding		
1981	Fung Kwong Sai Kai		
1981	The Land of the Brave		
1981	Special Treatment		
1981	Cheerful Wind		
1981	Lucky By Chance		
1982	Crimson Street		
1982	Six is Company		
1982	The Green, Green Grass of Home		
1982	Ye Sing Dik Ching Chun		
1983	Let's Make Laugh		
1984	Prince Charming		
1984	And Now What's Your Name		
1984	The Funny General		
1984	Shanghai Blues		
1985	The Flying Mr. B		
1986	Strange Bedfellow		
1986	100 Ways to Murder Your Wife		
1986	Millionaire's Express	Fook Loi	
1987	To Err is Humane		
1987	Armour of God	Band member	
1987	Reincarnation		
1987	My Cousin, the Ghost		
1987	My Heart is that Eternal Rose		
1987	Project A Part II		
1987	The Happy Bigamist		
1988	Mr. Possessed		
1988	One Husband Too Many		
1988	18 Times		
1988	Spy Games		
1989	Happy Together		
1989	A Fishy Story		
1989	Burning Sensation		
1989	City Squeeze		
1989	Bachelor's Swan Song	Chan Chi-Nam	
1989	Hearts No Flowers		
1989	Miracles		cameo
1989	My Heart Is That Eternal Rose		
1990	BB30		
1991	Sisters of the World Unite		
1991	Mainland Dundee		
1991	Top Bet		
1991	Today's Hero		
1991	Fist of Fury 1991	Smart	
1992	Fist of Fury 1991 II		
1992	Mary from Beijing		aka Awakening
1992	Once a Black Sheep		
1992	Saviour of the Soul	Siu-Chuen	
1992	The Ape which Turned into a Man		
1992	Family Squad	Lu Tong-quan	Guest Appearance
1993	The Eagle Shooting Heroes	Wong Chung-Yeung	
1993	The Tigers: the Legend of Canton		
1993	Rose, Rose I Love You		
1993	The Moon Warriors	Emperor Yen Ling	
1994	Smoke Amongst the Floor	Yuhang Jiang/Zeng	
1995	Ten Brothers		
1995	The Chinese Feast	Kit	
1995	Yan Suo Chong Lou	Jiang Yuhang/Zeng Yuhang	
1996	What a Wonderful Life		
1996	Twinkle, Twinkle Lucky Star		
1997	Northern Story	Mui Shi-hung	
1998	Ninth Happiness		
2000	Healing Hearts	Doctor Paul	
2001	Healing Hearts	Alan Yang	
2002	Happy Family	Mr Han	
2002	Troublesome Night 16	Sung Kong	
2003	Kang Gan Sheng Shi Mi Shi	Emperor Yongzheng	
2004	Super Model		
2004	Elixir of Love		
2004	Leave Me Alone		
2005	Initial D	Yuichi Tachibana	
2005	A Chinese Tall Story		
2006	Shanghai Red		
2006	The Return of the Condor Heroes	Gongsun Zhi	
2006	Shi Zi	Wong Wing-de	
2007	It's a Wonderful Life		
2010	Just Another Pandora's Box		
2010	Shanghai Blue		
2011	Mr. Zhai		
2011	A Land without Boundaries		
2011	East Meets West 2011		
2012	100% Kiss		
2012	Together		
2013	The Rooftop		
2013	Traversal 101		
2013	Star of Bethlehem		
2016	Finding Soul	Xia Xu	
2017	The Hunting Genius	Qiu Ling	
2018	Air Strike		
2018	House of the Rising Sons		
2019	Fagara	Ha Leung	
2021	Douluo Continent	Hao Tang	
2021	One Boat One World	Mister Tang	
2023	Blossoms Shanghai	Golden Kitchen	
2023	The Baking Challenge	Zhu Yukun	
2024	Detective Chinatown	Lam Ying-shu	Recurring Role, 8 Episodes
2025	Mr Right		

== Discography ==
=== Cantonese albums ===
- 閃閃星辰 – 1980
- 不可以不想你 – 1981
- 說愛就愛 – 1983
- 要是有緣 – 1983
- 我行我素 – 1984.07
- 鍾鎮濤精選 (Collection) – 1984
- 痴心的一句 – 1985.01
- 鍾鎮濤(淚之旅) – 1985.09
- 鍾鎮濤(Trip Mix): 淚之旅/太多考驗 (12" Single Mix) – 1985
- 情變 – 1986.05
- 鍾鎮濤(Trip Mix II): 香腸、蚊帳、機關槍/原諒我 (12" Single Mix) – 1986
- 最佳鍾鎮濤 (New Song + Collection) – 1986
- 寂寞 – 1987.03
- 聽濤 – 1987.10
- 晴 – 1988.05
- 情有獨鍾 (New Songs + Collection) – 1988.10
- 人潮內... 我像獨行 – 1989.03
- 看星的日子 – 30 November 1989
- B歌 (Collection, distributed in Singapore) – 1989
- 鍾鎮濤 (3" CD, Collection) – 1990
- 不死鳥 – August 1990
- 仍是真心 – August 1992
- 全部為你 – January 1994
- 鍾鎮濤金曲精選 (2 Discs, Collection) – 1993.12
- 88極品音色系列: 鍾鎮濤 Kenny Bee (Collection) – 1997.07
- B計劃 (2 Discs, New Songs + Collection) – March 1998
- B歌集 (2 Discs, Collection) – 1998.07
- 鍾鎮濤dCS聲選輯 (Collection) – 2000.02
- 俠骨仁心原聲專輯 – 2001.04.20
- 真經典鍾鎮濤 (Collection) – 2001.07.27
- 還有你 (2 Discs, Collection) – 2002.08.22
- 濤出新天 – 2006.12.29
- 佛誕吉祥 – 2009

=== Mandarin albums ===
- 我的伙伴 – 1979.05.09
- 早安台北 – 1979.08.20
- 白衣少女 – 1980
- 鍾鎮濤專輯 (Collection) – 1981
- 鍾鎮濤(阿B) (Mandarin/Cantonese) – 1982
- 表錯七日情(國) (Mandarin/Cantonese) – 1983
- 哦！寶貝‧為甚麼 – 1983
- 詩人與情人 – 1989.02
- 捨不得•這樣的日子 – 1989
- 捨不得 – 1990
- 飄 – 1990.09
- 活出自己 – 1991.06
- 我的世界只有你最懂 – 1992.06
- 祝你健康快樂 – 1993.09
- 情人的眼睛 (Collection) – 1994.02
- 簡簡單單的生活 – 1994
- 《煙鎖重樓》 – 1994.11.22
- 情歌對唱集(寂寞) (with Teresa Cheung, Mandarin/Cantonese) – 1995.05
- 痴心愛你 – 1995.06
- 男人 – 2004.02.16

=== English albums ===
- Why Worry – 1997
