= Pedicab Driver =

1989 Hong Kong film by Sammo Hung

- Film poster
- Directed by: Sammo Hung
- Written by: Barry Wong
- Produced by: Sammo Hung
- Starring: Sammo Hung; Lau Kar-leung; Max Mok; Billy Chow
- Distributed by: Bojon Films
- Release date: 24 February 1989
- Running time: 94 minutes
- Country: Hong Kong
- Languages: Cantonese; Portuguese
- Box office: HK$14,784,774

Pedicab Driver (Chinese: 群龍戲鳳; Cantonese Yale: Kwan lung hei fung) is a 1989 Hong Kong martial arts comedy film starring and directed by Sammo Hung, who also produced. Hung portrays the leader of a crew of cycle rickshaw drivers in 1930s Macau. The film also features guest appearances by Eric Tsang, Corey Yuen, and Lau Kar-leung. Warner Bros. has included the film in the catalogue of Warner Archive Collection.

== Plot ==
Lo Tung and his friend Malted Candy are pedicab drivers working on the streets of Macau. Lo Tung falls in love with a baker named Ping and Malted Candy falls in love with a prostitute named Hsaio Tsui. The problem is that both of the objects of their affections are working under cruel and lecherous bosses. The pair must somehow find a way to win the ladies' hearts and free them from their unpleasant jobs.

== Cast and roles ==
- Sammo Hung - Lo Tung
- Lau Kar-leung - Boss of Gambling House (as Kar Leung-Lau)
- Max Mok - Mai Chien-Tang / Malted Candy
- Chan Lung - Coolie
- Alfred Cheung - Jewelry Store Owner
- Billy Chow - Master 5's Man
- Chung Fat - Thug
- Maria Cordero - Auntie
- Lam Ching-ying - Uncle Sheng
- Billy Lau - Tan
- Nina Li Chi - Ping
- Lowell Lo - Shan Cha Cake
- Eddie Maher - Thug
- Mang Hoi - Rice Pudding
- John Shum - Master 5
- Sun Yueh - Fang
- Eric Tsang - Man with cleaver
- Dick Wei - Wei
- Manfred Wong - Pork bun seller
- Corey Yuen - Coolie (as Kwai Yuen)
- Fennie Yuen - Hsiao-Tsui
- James Mou - Keung
- Hsiao Hou - Master Five's Thug

== Reception ==
=== Box office ===
Pedicab Driver grossed $14,784,774 HKD at the Hong Kong box office.

In 2014, Time Out polled several film critics, directors, actors and stunt actors to list their top action films. Pedicab Driver was listed at 66th place on this list.

== Availability ==
Long out-of-print on VHS and LD, Pedicab Driver is available on DVD through Warner Archive. Arrow Video will release a limited edition 4K UHD & Blu-Ray in December 2026.

== See also ==
- List of films set in Macau
