= Jacob Cheung =

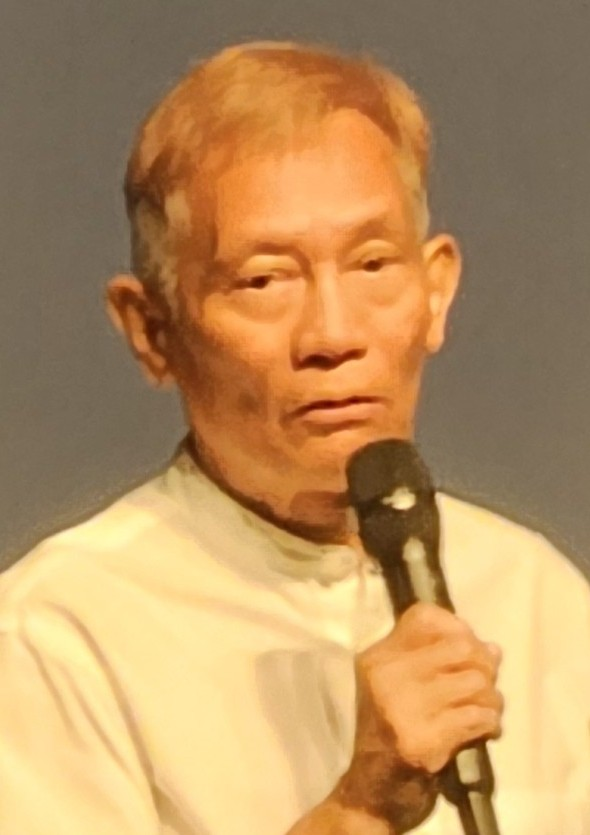
- Cheung in 2026
- Born: 6 September 1959 (age 67); Hong Kong
- Years active: 1989–2010
- Awards: Hong Kong Film Awards – Best Director; 1993 Cageman; Best Screenplay; 1990 Beyond the Sunset (shared with Chan Kam-cheung); 1993 Cageman (shared with Yank Wong and Ng Chong-chau)

Chinese name
- Traditional Chinese: 張之亮
- Simplified Chinese: 張之亮
Transcriptions
Standard Mandarin
- Hanyu Pinyin: zhang zhiliang
Yue: Cantonese
- Jyutping: jeung1 ji1-leung6

Jacob Cheung Chi-leung is a Hong Kong film director, producer, screenwriter, and actor. His credits include A Battle of Wits (2006), which was nominated for Best Director and Best Screenplay at the Golden Bauhinia Awards, and Beyond the Sunset (1989), which was nominated for two awards at the 9th Hong Kong Film Awards.

== Personal life ==
Cheung is married to Venus Wong and has four children: the triplets Matthew, Eugene and Jeremy, and their elder sister, Ingrid.

== Filmography ==
=== Director ===
- The White Haired Witch of Lunar Kingdom (2014)
- Rest on Your Shoulder (2011)
- Ticket (Che Piao) (2007)
- A Battle of Wits (2006)
- Hero on the Silkroad (2004)
- Never Say Goodbye (2001)
- Midnight Fly (2001)
- The Kid (1999)
- Intimates (1997)
- Whatever Will Be, Will Be (1995)
- The Returning (1994)
- Always on My Mind (1993)
- Lover's Tear (1992)
- Cageman (1992)
- Goodbye Hero (1990)
- Beyond the Sunset (1989)
- Lai Shi, China's Last Eunuch (1988)

=== Actor ===
- All About Women (2008)
- Hong Kong Graffiti (1997)
- My Dad is a Jerk (1997)
- Those Were the Days (1996)
- Cageman (1992)
- Au revoir, mon amour (1991)
- Hong Kong Godfather (1991)

=== Producer ===
- Midnight Fly (2001)
- Never Say Goodbye (2001)
- The Kid (1999)
- Intimates (1997)
- Signal Left, Turn Right (1996)
- I've Got You, Babe!!! (1994)
- Sparkling Fox (1993)

=== Screenplay ===
- A Battle of Wits (2006)
- The Returning (1994)
- Cageman (1992)
- Beyond the Sunset (1989)

=== Executive Associate Producer ===
- Mr. Vampire (1985)
