= My Dear Son =

1989 Hong Kong film by David Chiang

- Taiwanese film poster with alternate Chinese title
- Traditional Chinese: 我要富貴
- Simplified Chinese: 我要富贵
- Hanyu Pinyin: Wǒ Yào Fù Guì
- Jyutping: Ngo2 Jiu4 Fu4 Gwai4
- Directed by: David Chiang
- Screenplay by: Hau Chi-keung
- Produced by: Alan Tang
- Starring: Jacky Cheung; Bill Tung; Maggie Cheung; Sean Lau; Kathy Chow; Paul Chun
- Cinematography: Yee Tung-lung
- Edited by: Ma Chung-yiu; A Chik; Jacky Leung
- Music by: Danny Chung; Tang Siu-lam
- Production company: In-Gear Film Production
- Distributed by: In-Gear Film Production
- Release date: 25 May 1989
- Running time: 92 minutes
- Country: Hong Kong
- Language: Cantonese
- Box office: HK$2,995,161

My Dear Son is a 1989 Hong Kong action drama film directed by David Chiang and starring Jacky Cheung, Bill Tung, Maggie Cheung and Sean Lau.

== Plot ==
Ho Ka-chai (Bill Tung) makes a living by singing sex songs at a public square in Yung Shue Tau. His eldest son, Peter (Jacky Cheung), gets a job at the Lok's Group's data department. Peter persuades his father to retire from singing in public, since he can earn enough to support his father and two younger siblings, but Ka-chai refuses and reminds Peter of the many living expenses he would need. The night before going to his new job, Peter celebrates by having a hotpot dinner with his friend, Maddy (Sean Lau) a triad member who smuggles goods for a living, before the latter goes to settle a dispute with his rival, Tall Sum (Ricky Wong), which breaks into a gang fight that is witnessed by Peter and their childhood friend, Fung (Maggie Cheung). Peter arrives at his new job the next day where his father visits him at lunchtime and introduces himself to his colleagues. That same night, one of his colleagues, Jenny, visits Yung Shue Tau and recognizes them, which hurts Peter's self-esteem, since his colleague knows his father's occupation.

While his boss Martin (Wong Wan-choi) stresses how to quickly manufacture cans to sell an abundant amount of green peas, Peter reminds his boss the availability of unused tinplates purchased by Lok's Group from 1985 and impresses his boss. Martin brings Peter to a nightclub where he is introduced to Martin's boss Mr. Chun (Paul Chun) and Chun's younger sister, Petty (Kathy Chow), who plays drinking games and dances with Peter until they are interrupted by a drunk Fung, who works as a server at that bar, and brings her home. Peter returns to the bar after his bosses have left, but Petty takes him for a ride in her convertible where they get robbed, but manage to flee, which Petty considers a thrilling experience. The next day, Petty lends Peter her convertible, which is noticed by Ka-chai and Fung, and he uses it to drive his younger siblings around. That night, Petty brings Peter to a high class dinner to celebrate the birthday of an old friend. When Peter sees the prices on the menu, he calls his father to bring some cash to the restaurant and Ka-chai arrives at the restaurant with his friend, Uncle Min (Cheng Gwan-min), dressed in tuxedos, and takes care of Peter's bill, lying to him that Min has won a lottery.

The next day, Peter arrives home beaten after negotiating for Lok's Group in repossessing a flat and Maddy settles the problem for Peter by intimating the tenant with his gang. Peter impresses Chun and Martin, and they bring him to dinner, but Ka-chai arrives at Lok's Group where he introduces himself to Peter's bosses and invites them to celebrate his son's birthday at a nightclub, where Ka-chai sings a song for his son. However, Peter's siblings unintentionally reveal their father's occupation, which displeases Chun. To make matters worse, Chun also sees his sister and Peter kissing in a dance. The next day, Martin warns Peter to stay away from Petty, who happens to barge into the office to bring him to a friend's birthday celebration. Stopping by Petty's house to retrieve her gift, they are confronted by Chun, who insults Peter's father in front of him and drives him away. Petty refuses to believe her brother's accusations until he brings her to see Ka-chai performing a sex song in Yung Shue Tau and she breaks up with Peter while Chun insults Ka-chai. Peter also receives a phonecall from Martin informing him of his dismissal when he arrives home and gets into a heated argument with his father for not listening to his suggestion to retire from singing sex songs, while Ka-chai argues that anyone can look down upon him except Peter because he was raised by the money that was made from singing sex songs.

Fung and Maddy then join Peter for drinks at a nightclub when Chun and Martin arrive. Peter tries to plead with Chun to give his job back, but Chun ridicules him. Peter and Maddy then confront Chun in the bathroom where Peter manages to intimate Chun without saying a word, but ultimately spares Chun, who is frightened. Peter then gets drunk and is brought home by Maddy and Fung and the latter cares for him before making out in bed. Later, Peter decides to join Maddy's gang and, in a fight against Tall Sum and his gang, brutally slashes Sum's underlings, much to the shock of Maddy. Peter then enters the business trade of smuggled televisions with Maddy. While Maddy goes to deliver the goods, Peter is captured by Sum's underlings. Sum tries to persuade Peter to work for him, but Peter refuses and beats him up, hanging Sum on his car window as he drives, which causes Sum to fall off.

While splitting the profits with his gang, Maddy shows Peter a handgun he acquired from China. With his money he earned from smuggling, Peter buys a gift for his father and siblings, but Ka-chai refuses them, having been bought with ill-gotten gains, and scolds his son. Later, Tall Sum and his gang trash Ka-chai's singing booth to get back at Peter, who fights them alongside Maddy, but Sum cripples Peter's younger brother and slashes Fung's back. Fung eventually dies from her wounds at the hospital while helping Peter and Ka-chai reconcile. When Peter and Maddy proceed to seek revenge, they are ambushed by Sum and his gang which results in the death of the latter. Ka-chai then arrives at Sum's warehouse to plead with him to spare his son, but Sum forces him to swallow a live goldfish and spit it back out alive. Ka-chai successfully does it and Sum pretends to agree to his request, but instead he pushes him off the stairs and beats him. Peter then arrives and shoots Sum and a couple of his underlings with a handgun he found in Maddy's home, but Ka-chai attempts to stop him from killing Sum, who then holds Ka-chai hostage. Peter drops his gun and beats up Sum before picking his gun back up and killing him. As the police arrive, Ka-chai takes the gun from Peter and fires a final shot at Sum in front of the police in order to cover the murder for his son and is arrested shortly afterwards. While Ka-chai is serving time in prison, Peter takes up his father's occupation in singing sex songs and raises his younger siblings.

== Cast ==
- Jacky Cheung as Peter Ho (何天翔)
- Bill Tung as Ho Ka-chai (何家猜)
- Maggie Cheung as Chow Fung (周楓)
- Sean Lau as Maddy (大傻)
- Kathy Chow as Petty Chun
- Paul Chun as Mr. Chun (秦生)
- Wong Wan-choi as Martin Ma
- Ricky Wong as Tall Sum (高佬森)
- Dion Lam as Gang member
- Ngai Tim-choi as Gang member
- Paco Yik as Gang member
- Kelvin Wong
- Cheng Gwan-min as Uncle Min (綿叔)
- Leung Chun-kit
- Jeffrey Ho
- Law Ching-ho as Waiter
- Tse Wai-kit
- So Siu-shing
- Wong Chi-wai as Gang member
- Jackson Ng as Gang member
- Pong Keung-fai as Doctor
- Chang Sing-kwong as Gang member
- Lam Foo-wai as Gang member
- Wong Mei-hsing
- Wat Bo-yin
- Fung Wai-ping
- Tang Chiu-yau as Gang member
- Lee Yiu-king as Gang member
- Derek Kok as Gang member
- Peter Kwok as Office clerk
- Wong Wai-fai as Gang member

== Theme song ==
The film's theme song is a cover of the song, Counting Balls (數波波), which was composed by Drunk Snake, with lyrics written by Leung San-yan and was originally sung by Wan Kwong. Bill Tung sings the song during the opening credits while Jacky Cheung sings it during the end credits.

== Reception ==
=== Critical reception ===
My Dear Son earned a score of 7/10 stars on the Chinese media rating site, Douban.

=== Box office ===
The film grossed HK$2,995.261 at the Hong Kong box office during its theatrical run from 25 May to 2 June 1989.

== Home media ==
My Dear Son has been released on VCD on 1 November 2001 in Hong Kong by Media Asia's Mega Star Video Distribution. To date, the film has yet to see release on DVD and Blu-ray.
