= Elizabeth Lee (actress) =

Hong Kong actress

Elizabeth Lee Mei Fung (Chinese: 李美鳳) is a Hong Kong actress. She was born 31 August 1963 in Hong Kong.

== Filmography ==
- The Romancing Star 2 (1988) as Ching Po-chu (程寶珠)
- Picture of a Nymph (1988)
- How to Pick Girls Up! (1988)
- He Who Chases After the Wind (1988)
- Gunmen (1988) as Mona Fong Siu-man
- The Greatest Lover (1988)
- The Yuppie Fantasia (1989) as Jenny, Foon's first love
- Web of Deception (1989)
- Long Arm of the Law Part 3 (1989) as Seung Moon (常满)
- How to Be a Millionaire... Without Really Trying (1989)
- City Squeeze (1989)
- Blonde Fury (1989)
- All Night Long (1989)
- Widow Warriors (1990)
- Sunshine Friends (1990)
- Return Engagement (1990) as Tsim Siu-fung (錢小鳳)
- Deadly Deal (1991)
- Freedom Run Q (1992)
- The Sword Stained with Royal Blood (1993) as Wan Yee
- Love to Kill (1993)
- Underground Banker (1994)
- Organized Crime & Triad Bureau (1994)
- A Touch of Evil (1995)
- The Trail of Love (1995) (TV series)
- Thunderstorm (1996)
