= All About Ah-Long =

1989 Hong Kong film by Johnnie To

- Hong Kong DVD cover

Chinese name
- Traditional Chinese: 阿郎的故事
- Simplified Chinese: 阿郎的故事
Transcriptions
Standard Mandarin
- Hanyu Pinyin: Ā Láng De Gù Shì
Yue: Cantonese
- Jyutping: A3 Long4 Dik1 Gu3 Si6
- Directed by: Johnnie To
- Screenplay by: Philip Cheng; Ng Man-fai
- Story by: Sylvia Chang; Chow Yun-fat
- Produced by: Raymond Wong
- Starring: Chow Yun-fat; Sylvia Chang
- Cinematography: Wong Wing-hang
- Edited by: Wong Wing-ming
- Music by: Lo Ta-yu
- Production company: Cinema City & Films Co.
- Distributed by: Cinema City & Films Co.
- Release date: 16 March 1989
- Running time: 95 minutes
- Country: Hong Kong
- Language: Cantonese
- Box office: HK$30,913,083

All About Ah-Long (Chinese: 阿郎的故事, Taiwan title:又見阿郎) is a 1989 Hong Kong drama film directed by Johnnie To and starring Chow Yun-fat and Sylvia Chang, who also serve as the film's storywriters.

== Synopsis ==
Chow Yun-fat plays Ah-Long, a single father trying to raise his son, Porky (Huang Kun-Hsuen), on a low-income as a truckdriver at a construction site. The son's mother, Por-por, Ah-Long's ex-girlfriend (played by Sylvia Chang) left him ten years ago for the United States after a lovers' spat. Ten years ago, Por-por had become Ah-Long's lover despite her mother's objections. However, the relationship was damaged by Ah-Long's infidelity and brutality. As Por-por was giving birth in the hospital, Ah-Long was involved in illegal racing and was put behind bars. Por-por's mother lied to her, telling her that her baby did not survive, and took Por-por to the United States where she later became a film director.

It is now ten years on. Por-por returns from the United States with a boyfriend to shoot a video commercial. An audition is held for a video commercial and the advertising company wants to engage Porky. Ah-Long visits the advertising company's office and finds out that Por-por is in charge but is dismayed to discover that Por-por has a boyfriend. Por-por is business-like because she does not realise that Porky is her own son but instantly feels an affinity to him. Por-por eventually finds out that Porky is her son, begins to bond with her son that she never knew and wants to reunite with him. During an argument Porky tells Ah-Long that he is dismayed at his life and says that he wants to go live with his mother. Ah-Long sends Porky to stay with Por-por for a while. As Ah-Long and Por-por slowly get reacquainted, Ah-Long thinks that Por-por wants to rekindle the relationship and returns a bracelet to her to imply that he is interested in this. Por-por reveals that she wants to bring Porky back to the United States, shattering Ah-Long's dreams.

Ah-Long decides to try his luck at motorbike racing, which he did before, resulting in steel rods in his legs. Ah-Long is determined to win the race to give his son a better future. Por-por's boyfriend purchases an air ticket for Por-por to return to the United States immediately. The next morning, as the race is about to begin, Ah-Long steels himself at the starting line. Por-por appears at the race track and Ah-Long manages to see her. She is wearing the bracelet and Ah-Long knows that he has been forgiven; they smile at each other.

The motorbikes go around the race track without a conclusive leader. During the sixth lap Ah-Long takes the lead but loses control and crashes, causing the other riders to slow down or to crash as well. As he is struggling to get up, Ah-Long is hit by another motorbike. His head is bleeding but he is determined to complete the race. As the other motorbikes whiz by, Ah-Long picks himself up again and re-enters the race. Despite bleeding and eyesight that is starting to blur, Ah-Long manages to win. Ah-Long manages to see Porky and Por-por cheer for him as he passes them by. A moment later Ah-Long loses consciousness and plows into the side. His motorbike catches fire and Ah-Long lies pinned under the motorbike and unable to move. Porky and Por-por run towards him across the race track. Ah-Long reaches out to them before the motorbike explodes, killing him.

== Cast ==
- Chow Yun-fat as Yeung Ah-Long
- Sylvia Chang as Sylvia Poon/Por-Por
- Ng Man-tat as Dragon Ng
- Huang Kun-Hsuen as Porky Yeung
- Alan Ka-Lun Yu as Patrick Yu, Sylvia's new boyfriend
- Wong Tin-lam as TV Producer
- Joe Chu as Motorcycle racer
- Tam Siu-hung as Sylvia's mother
- Sze Kai-keung as Fat Man at tug-of-war
- Tsui Oi-sam as Fat woman at tug-of-war
- Lee Him-hung as Motorcycle racer
- Chan Kwok-keung as Motorcycle racer

== Reception ==
All About Ah-Long was a critical and box office hit in Hong Kong, due to Chow Yun-fat's rise to popularity as an actor at the time. Chow won his third Hong Kong Film Award for Best Actor for his role in the film. The drama-based film is generally hailed as one of Johnnie To's masterpieces due to its strong storyline and the excellent portrayal of the characters. To was known as a comedy/action film maker at the time and All About Ah-Long was a showcase of his versatility.

Wong Kwan-yuen, who played Porky in the film, was ten years old at the time of the film's release. The film is also frequently cited as one of the milestones in Sylvia Chang's career.

== Awards and nominations ==
The movie was nominated for nine Hong Kong Film Awards, but the film only managed to win the Best Actor award, for Chow Yun-fat, who was also nominated in the same category for God of Gamblers.

- 9th Hong Kong Film Awards
  - Won – Best Actor (Chow Yun-fat)
  - Nominated – Best Picture
  - Nominated – Best Director (Johnnie To)
  - Nominated – Best Actress (Sylvia Chang)
  - Nominated – Best Supporting Actor (Wong Kwan-yuen)
  - Nominated – Best Screenplay (Ng Man-fai], Philip Cheng)
  - Nominated – Best New Artist (Wong Kwan-yuen)
  - Nominated – Best Original Score (Lo Ta-yu, Lo Sai-kit)
  - Nominated – Best Song ("Ah Long's Love Song" (阿郎戀曲), composed by Lo Ta-yu, lyrics written and performed by Sam Hui)

== Filming locations ==
- Shatin Inn restaurant in Sha Tin, where Ah-Long tells Sylvia that Porky is her son
- The Guia Circuit of the Macau Grand Prix was the setting for the final motorcycle race
- Li Chit Street, Wan Chai, since demolished by the Land Development Corporation

== See also ==
- List of Hong Kong films
- List of films set in Macau
- Burn Out (film)
- Centauro (film)
