= Web of Deception (1989 film) =

1989 Hong Kong film by David Chung

- DVD cover
- 驚魂記
- Directed by: David Chung
- Written by: Lui Fa
- Produced by: Tsui Hark
- Starring: Brigitte Lin Pauline Wong Joey Wang
- Cinematography: David Chung
- Edited by: Fan Kung Ming
- Music by: Chiu Man Hoi
- Production companies: Golden Princess Film Production; Film Workshop
- Distributed by: Golden Princess Amusement Co., Ltd. (Hong Kong); Long Shong Pictures Ltd. (Taiwan)
- Release date: 1989
- Running time: 98 minutes
- Country: Hong Kong
- Language: Cantonese

Web of Deception (Traditional Chinese: 驚魂記; Simplified Chinese: 惊魂记), also known as Deception, is a 1989 Hong Kong mystery thriller film directed by David Chung and produced by Tsui Hark. It starts Brigitte Lin as successful barrister Jane, Pauline Wong as her long-time assistant May, and Joey Wang as May's roommate Queenie and her twin Catherine. To protect her reputation and licence to practice, Jane sells her shares to obtain a large sum of money so she could pay off her blackmailer, who turns out to be May. Queenie, in need of money to pay off Catherine's debt, collaborates with May to steal the money from Jane's mansion.

Pauline Wang was nominated as Best Supporting Actress at the 9th Hong Kong Film Awards and 26th Golden Horse Awards.

== Plot ==
May, a hardworking assistant at a law firm, was passed over by her long-time boss, Jane, for a relocation opportunity to Canada because of her lack of qualification certificates. In retaliation, she secretly sends Jane a blackmail letter demanding 1 million HKD, in exchange for keeping quiet about a white-collar crime Jane committed five years ago to safeguard her practicing licence. Jane is suspicious of May, but eventually chooses to trust her and enlists her help to catch the blackmailer. This causes May to feel guilty, and she decides not to proceed with the blackmail. Jane's suspicions transfer to Mimi, her stockbroker, whom she requested to sell her remaining stock and deliver the cash to her house in person. May shows up at Jane's mansion with files Jane requested for, when Mimi arrives with the money, allowing May to see where Jane kept the cash.

Queenie, May's roommate, picks up her sister Catherine from prison. While having dinner at a restaurant, a loan shark mistakes Queenie for Catherine and threatens to harm her if she doesn't return his money. Queenie seeks out advice from May, who encourages her to steal the blackmail money from Jane's house while she's out that night for an office party. Catherine quietly follows her sister to the mansion. Jane prepares for the party later than May expected, while Queenie enters the house thinking it was empty. Queenie gets caught, and during the struggle, is accidentally stabbed by her axe and dies from her injuries after. Shaken from the encounter, Jane asks May to call the police when the latter rings her home number, and hides in her bedroom. Catherine arrives to find her sister's dead body. She drags Queenie's body down the basement, while May rushes to the mansion from the party. When she arrives, Catherine, having never met May and unaware of the blackmail plot, impersonates Queenie to avoid suspicion. May and Jane go through the aftermath of the struggle to figure out who the mysterious intruder was, while Catherine hides Queenie's body in a closet. Eventually, May helps Catherine escape, and Jane calls for anti-burglary installation services the next day.

Back at home, Catherine is attacked by the loan shark, whom she murders during the struggle. Free from debt, Catherine is determined to avenge her sister's death, and returns to the mansion. Jane confronts Mimi, who insists she isn't the blackmailer, and did not visit the mansion the night before. Mimi leaves in anger as Catherine reappears, pretending to be a masseuse hired by May. When inspecting the anti-burglary system, May discovers Queenie's body in the basement. While Jane talks to her boyfriend Inspector Li, May confronts Catherine, who reveals her plot to kill Jane with rat poison, and threatens to call the police on May. While checking her stash of money in the basement, Jane accidentally discovers Queenie's body.

When Jane asks May to call ahead before delivering the money to the bank for her, she notices that the call didn't go through despite May having a 'conversation' with the bank manager. Jane keeps the money with her, while Catherine sabotages any escape attempts by the other two women. All three have an intense dinner, with food prepared by Catherine, implied to contain poison. Mimi arrives to pass Jane a cheque in anger. Jane declines her cheque, but not before scribbling a message behind it to call the police. Catherine prevents Mimi from leaving, and stars a fire outside the house to lure Jane out of her bedroom. Jane escapes the mansion, and drives off in May's car with Queenie's body in the backseat. Catherine appears, having hidden under Queenie's body, and tries to kill Jane. After some struggle, Jane gains the upper hand, and saves Catherine from an incoming vehicle.

Jane moves to Canada, while May finds a new job at an unnamed island. Catherine takes on Queenie's identity and starts over a new, crime-free life. Some time later, Mimi is visited by investigators, who obtained the cheque with Jane's message from that night. In exchange for a lighter sentence, she reveals the identities of those involved in their investigation linked to the loan shark's death. All four women are sentenced to various durations of prison time for different crimes, and Jane's practicing licence is revoked.

== Cast ==
- Brigitte Lin as Jane Lam
- Pauline Wong as May
- Joey Wang as Queenie/Catherine
- Elizabeth Lee as Mimi Chow
- Waise Lee as Inspector Li
- Gam Biu as Mr Mak
- Chan Chi-Fai as Loan shark
- Shing Fu-On as Taxi driver
- Chan Hau-Ling as Fanny

== Nominations ==
Award	Year	Category	Nominee	Results
9th Hong Kong Film Awards	1989	Best Supporting Actress	Pauline Wong	Nominated
26th Golden Horse Awards	1989	Best Supporting Actress	Pauline Wong	Nominated

== Reviews ==
Reviewing for Far East Films, Rob Daniel gave the film 4 out of 5 stars, praising director and cinematographer David Chung's ability to wind up the tension and paranoia through clever use of composition and reveal, drawing inspiration from various thriller classics and Hitchcockian influences. Pauline Wong's performance was also praised as a driving force throughout the film.
