= The First Time Is the Last Time =

1989 Hong Kong film by Raymond Leung

- DVD cover
- Traditional Chinese: 第一繭
- Simplified Chinese: 第一茧
- Hanyu Pinyin: Dì Yī Jiǎn
- Jyutping: Dai6 Jat1 Gaan2
- Directed by: Raymond Leung
- Screenplay by: Yue Fan
- Produced by: Raymond Leung; Leung Ming
- Starring: Andy Lau; Carrie Ng; Season Ma; Meg Lam
- Cinematography: Ma Kam-cheung; Andrew Lau; Paul Chan
- Edited by: Norman Wong; Cheung Ka-fai
- Music by: Lowell Lo
- Production company: Seven mm Films
- Distributed by: Seven mm Films
- Release date: 15 April 1989
- Running time: 92 minutes
- Country: Hong Kong
- Language: Cantonese
- Box office: HK$7,969,241

The First Time Is the Last Time is a 1989 Hong Kong action drama film directed by Raymond Leung and starring Andy Lau, Carrie Ng, Season Ma, and Meg Lam.

== Plot ==
Ma Yuk-fung (Season Ma) is a simple-minded girl who would blindly do anything for love. Under the instigation of her triad member boyfriend, Robert, Yuk-fung goes into prison to kill Winnie Wong to avenge Robert's triad boss, Man (Lam Chung). Yuk-fung was then found guilty of drug possession and imprisoned for six months. In prison, Yuk-fung misses Robert day and night, oblivious to the fact that Robert is just using her. In prison, Yuk-fung is bullied by inmate He-man, but fortunately gets help from inmates Crazy Bitch (Carrie Ng) and 5354 (Meg Lam) to avoid further bullying.

5354 is a recidivist who intentionally got pregnant before imprisonment, so her sentence is halved. Nevertheless, 5354 and her child's father have feelings for each other.

Crazy Bitch is a disfigured murder felon who gives herself up in prison and often causes trouble. Later, due to Yuk-fung's sincere attitude, Crazy Bitch brightens up. They often talk about their own pasts. Crazy Bitch had a poor childhood because her family lived on a boat. As a child, she was sold by her drug-addicted father and became a prostitute, and she also got addicted to drugs. One night, she was harassed in a nightclub and was saved by a triad member, Yung (Andy Lau). The next day, Yung also negotiated with a rival gang for her, and Yung was injured during a chaotic fight. Yung hid with Crazy Bitch in the public restroom, and they became affectionate. Soon after, Crazy Bitch cohabited with Yung, and during that time, Yung helped her get rid of her drug addiction, and she actively lived a new life. The two spent their happiest moments together. Later, Yung turned out to be an undercover cop who abhorred injustice as his foe. Crazy Bitch worried that her operation would fail and requested that they immigrate and start a new life in Canada together. Yung was then killed at the final moment by Man, and Crazy Bitch's hopes were destroyed. Crazy Bitch avenged Yung, killed Man and his underlings in a sauna, and was thus sentenced to prison. In the process, she was also disfigured by a burning sauna stone.

Yuk-fung finds a kitten in prison and secretly takes care of it. The friendship of Yuk-fung, Crazy Bitch, and 5354 enhances over time. Yuk-fung and 5354 also look forward to their new lives with their boyfriends after their release from prison. But good times do not last, as Crazy Bitch finds out in prison that her father died from drug abuse. Yuk-fung also discovers that her assassination target, Winnie Wong, is actually Crazy Bitch. 5354 is then killed by a mentally disturbed inmate, Jenny (Ngai Suet), and her unborn baby is also killed.

Yuk-fung thinks highly of her friendship with Winnie and refuses to abide by Robert. On the day of her release, Yuk-fung leaves with her kitten, waiting for Robert to pick her up, but the conscienceless Robert runs her over with his car and crushes her to death. The kitten flees back into the room, and Winnie picks it up where the film ends with her sad expression.

== Cast ==
- Andy Lau as Yung
- Carrie Ng as Crazy Bitch / Winnie Wong
- Season Ma as Ma Yuk-fung, Inmate 7144
- Meg Lam as Inmate 5354
- Ngai Suet as Jenny
- Kenneth Tsang as Jenny's father
- Wang Lung-wei as Keung's triad boss
- Andy Tai as Chief Inspector Chan
- Kan Tat-wah as Keung
- Peter Ngo as Yung's cop partner
- Lam Chung as Man
- Law Yiu-hung as Member of Keung's triad
- Lam Wai-man
- Yeung Kit-ngai
- Wan Po-yee
- Yeung Kin-wai as Prison Officer Lee
- Ng Fung-ching
- Kan Sam-mei
- Garry Chan as Drug dealer shot by CI Chan
- Yiu Wai-ming
- Dora Chu
- Law Shu-kei as Chief of prison
- Wong Hung as Whoremonger
- Chan Kit-ling
- Lau Shung-fung as Triad member

== Box office ==
The film grossed HK$7,969,241 at the Hong Kong box office during its theatrical run from 15 to 27 April, in Hong Kong.

== See also ==
- Andy Lau filmography
