= Maggie Cheung =

Hong Kong actress (born 1964)

- 張曼玉
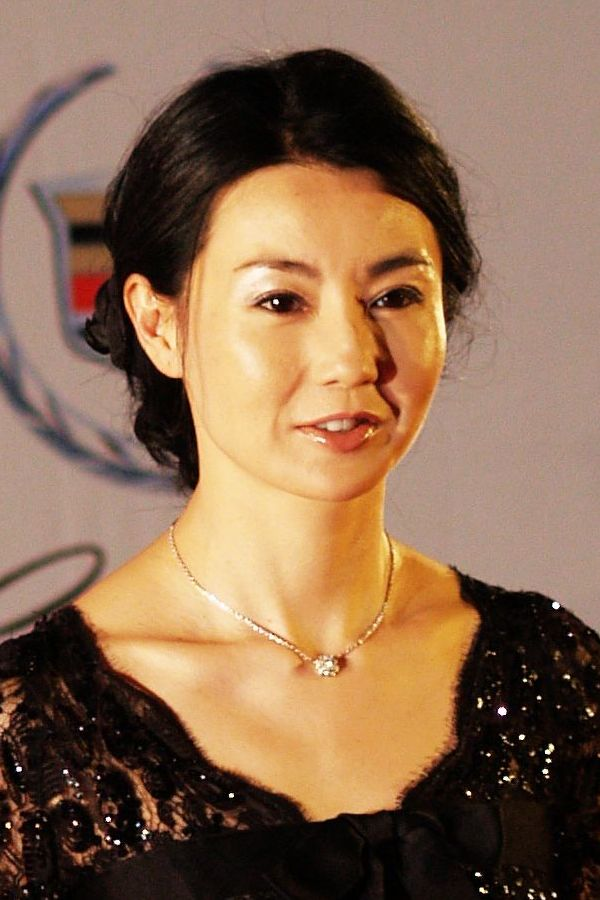
- Cheung at the 2007 Shanghai International Film Festival
- Born: Cheung Man-yuk; 20 September 1964 (age 62); British Hong Kong
- Education: St. Paul's Primary Catholic School, Happy Valley; St Edmund's School, Canterbury
- Occupation: Actress
- Years active: 1984–2004; 2010
- Height: 168 cm (5 ft 6 in)
- Spouse: Olivier Assayas (m. 1998; div. 2001)

Chinese name
- Traditional Chinese: 張曼玉
- Simplified Chinese: 张曼玉
Transcriptions
Standard Mandarin
- Hanyu Pinyin: Zhāng Mànyù
Yue: Cantonese
- Jyutping: Zoeng1 Maan6 Juk2

Maggie Cheung Man-yuk (Chinese: 張曼玉; pinyin: Zhāng Mànyù; born 20 September 1964) is a former Hong Kong actress. Widely regarded as one of the most successful and internationally acclaimed actresses in Asia, Cheung is the recipient of numerous accolades, including six Hong Kong Film Awards and five Golden Horse Awards, holding the record for most awards in the Best Actress category. Internationally, she is best known for winning the Silver Bear for Center Stage (1991) and the Cannes Film Festival Award for Clean (2004), making her the first Asian actress to receive the latter and the only Asian actress to have won Best Actress awards at two of the three major European film festivals.

Cheung first rose to prominence in the 1980s, gaining wide recognition through her collaboration with Jackie Chan in the Police Story film series. She quickly expanded her work from commercial action and comedy to dramatic roles, appearing in films such as As Tears Go By (1988), Days of Being Wild (1990), Irma Vep and Comrades, Almost a Love Story (both 1996). Her international breakthrough came with Wong Kar-wai's In the Mood for Love (2000), which not only gained her worldwide fame but also received widespread acclaim, ranking fifth on Sight & Sound magazine's 2022 list of the top 100 films in film history. The website of Entertainment Weekly in the United States once listed the "51 classic performances overlooked by the Oscars" in the 86-year history of the Oscars, and Cheung's performance in In the Mood for Love became one of the only two Asian performances on the list.

Since the late 2000s, Cheung has largely stepped back from acting, making only occasional public appearances at festivals, fashion events, and industry ceremonies. Beyond acting, she has taken on selective creative and philanthropic roles, including serving as a UNICEF ambassador.

== Early life ==
Maggie Cheung was born in Hong Kong on 20 September 1964 to Shanghainese parents. She attended St. Paul's Primary Catholic School in Happy Valley, where she began at the primary one level. Her family emigrated from Hong Kong to the United Kingdom when she was eight. She spent part of her childhood and adolescence in Bromley, London, and attended St Edmund's School, Canterbury. She returned to Hong Kong at the age of 18 in 1982 for a vacation but ended up staying for modelling assignments and other commitments. She also briefly had a sales job at the Lane Crawford department store.

In 1983, Cheung entered the Miss Hong Kong pageant and won the first runner-up and the Miss Photogenic award as well. She was a semi-finalist in the Miss World pageant the same year. After two years as a TV presenter, it led to a contract with TVB (the television arm of the Shaw Bros. Studio).

Cheung is a polyglot as a result of her upbringing in Hong Kong and England, ten years' stay in Paris and five years' stay in Beijing. In Center Stage, Cheung performed in Cantonese, Mandarin, and Shanghainese fluently, switching languages with ease. In Clean, she performed in fluent English, French, and Cantonese.

== Career ==
=== 1984–1987: Early work ===
Shortly after her debut, Maggie Cheung broke into the film industry by starring in the comedy Prince Charming (1984), which became a box office hit. Her standout performance caught the attention of Jackie Chan, who subsequently cast her as May—a long-suffering girlfriend—in the 1985 film Police Story. The movie achieved tremendous success, catapulting Cheung to overnight stardom and cementing her popularity across Asia.

=== 1988–1994: Breakthrough ===
Despite her success, Cheung found herself typecast in the roles of comics or weak, clumsy women. Realizing this, Cheung wanted to break away by seeking more dramatic roles. She got this opportunity when Wong Kar-wai cast her in As Tears Go By (1988), the first of her many collaborations with Wong.

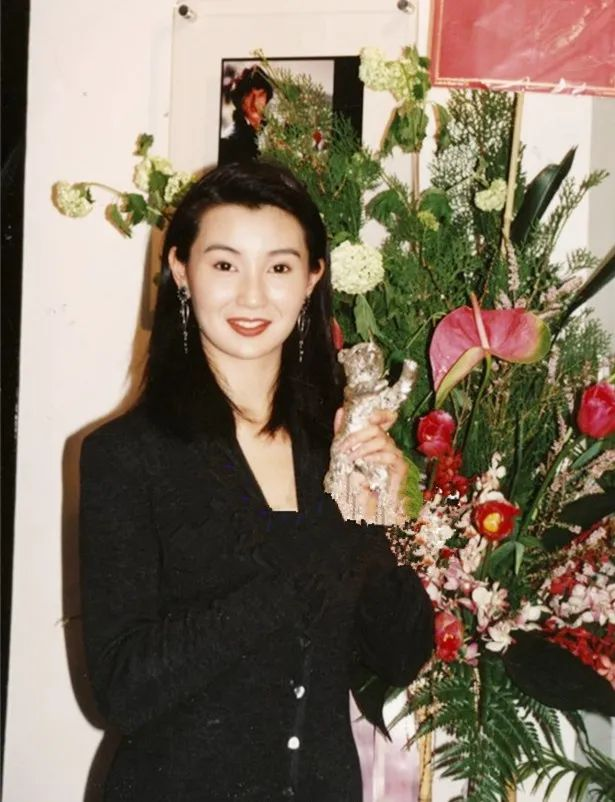
Cheung at the 1992 Berlin International Film Festival

Cheung often cites the film as the piece that truly began her serious acting career, and she won critical praise for it. In 1989–1990, she won Best Actress awards at the Golden Horse Award and Hong Kong Film Award for her work in Full Moon in New York and A Fishy Story respectively. Rolling Red Dust won the Golden Horse Award for Best Supporting Actress.

In 1992, she became the first Chinese performer to win a Best Actress Award at the prestigious Berlin Film Festival for her work in Center Stage (1991). Cheung made a historic contribution to China in the performance award. With this film, Maggie Cheung won the Best Actress Award at the Taiwan Golden Horse Film Awards, the Best Actress Award at the Hong Kong Film Awards, and many other awards. Cheung subsequently proved her versatility with roles in action films. Her performance in the sci-fi martial arts smash hit The Heroic Trio (1992) and its sequel, Executioners (1993), impressed both critics and audiences with her martial arts skills. Also in a departure from her usual roles, Cheung played a beautiful and vicious femme fatale in New Dragon Gate Inn (1992). In the film Green Snake (1993), she played a snake demon who transformed into a human form. She was both good and evil, yearning for human emotions while feeling confused about them. In Wong Kar-wai's film Ashes of Time (1994), she almost carried the soul of the character with "static performance": without fierce dramatic conflicts, she conveyed turbulent emotions through eyes, gestures and silence.

=== 1996–2004: International prominence ===
After having acted in more than 68 movies, most of which were action films, in less than a decade, she decided to take her career in another direction. She took a two-year sabbatical and used the time to reflect upon which kinds of roles interested her. She began getting interested in art and music, she travelled and perfected her language studies.

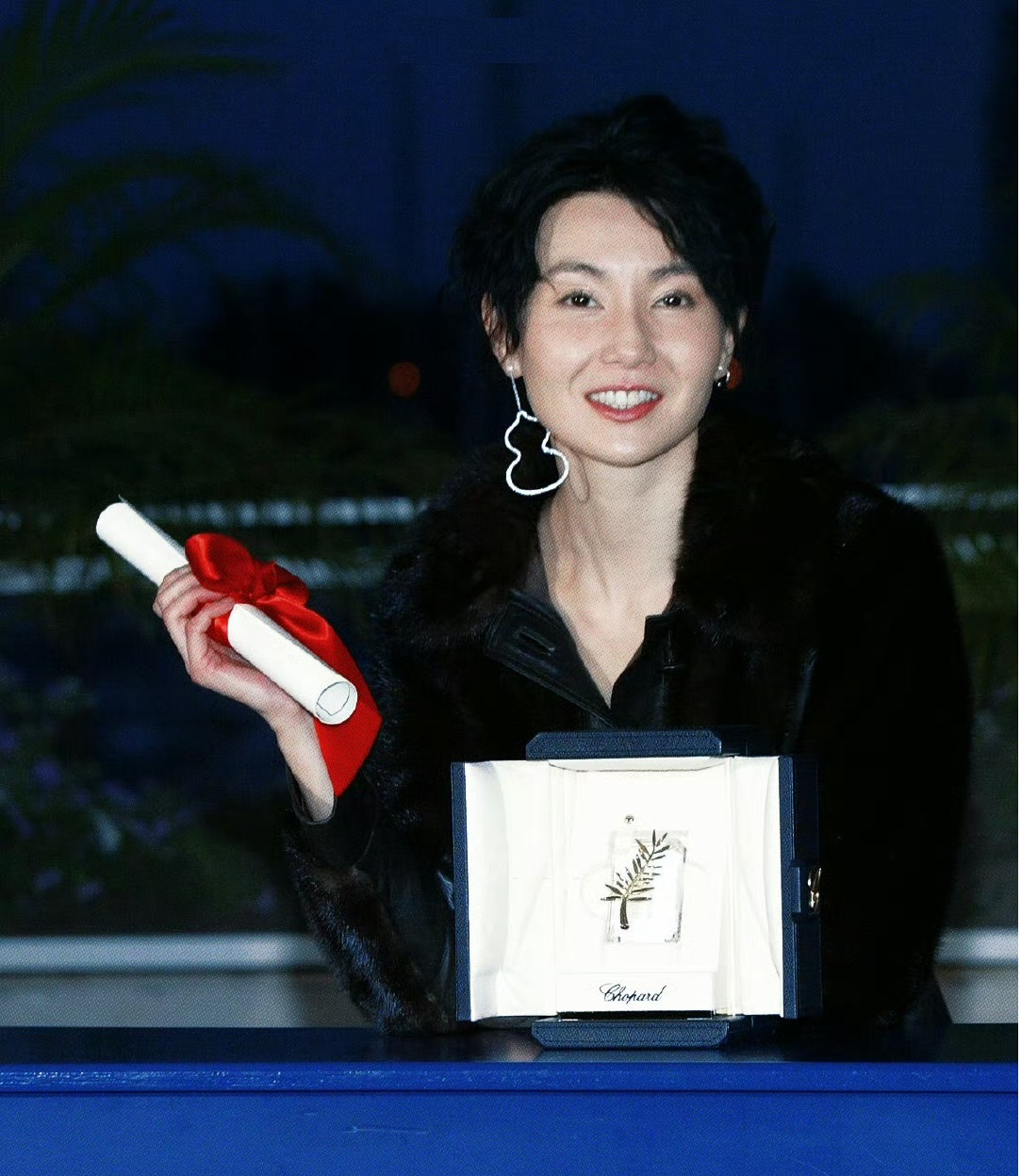
Cheung at the 2004 Cannes Film Festival

Then, she returned to the set, but began to carefully select the co-productions and directors. After taking a break in 1994, Cheung returned to film Olivier Assayas' Irma Vep (1996), which helped her break into the international scene.The film was shortlisted for the Un Certain Regard section of the Cannes Film Festival. That same year, she won further acclaim for her work in the romantic film Comrades: Almost a Love Story, in which she played one of a pair of lovers kept apart for ten years by fate. With this film, she won the Golden Horse Award in Taiwan, the Hong Kong Film Awards and the Best Actress in the Asia-Pacific Film Festival. The film was selected as a classic unit of Venice Film Festival in 2013.

In 1997, she made her first English-language film in Wayne Wang's Chinese Box (1997). Cast as a mysterious young woman named Jean, Cheung held her own alongside the more internationally well-established stars, Jeremy Irons and Gong Li. The film was shortlisted for the Venice Film Festival and won the Best Music Award.

After her 1998 marriage to Olivier Assayas, Cheung stayed mainly in France. In the same year, she won the Best Actress Award at the Hong Kong Film Awards for the fourth time for her performance in the film The Soong Sisters (1997). She returned to Hong Kong to film In the Mood for Love (2000), which won critical acclaim and a fourth Taiwanese Golden Horse Award for Best Leading Actress for Cheung. She also won the Best Actress Award at the Hong Kong Film Awards for the fifth time. The film was shortlisted in the main competition unit of Cannes Film Festival, and won the French film César Awards, the German film Laura Award and the Best Foreign Language Film award at the British Academy Film Awards and the David di Donatello Awards, where it also received a Best Foreign Language Film nomination. In 2000, it represented Hong Kong at the Oscar Awards for the Best Foreign Language film.

In 2002, she starred in Hero, a martial arts epic directed by Zhang Yimou. As a landmark commercial blockbuster in the history of Chinese cinema, the film set a new box office record for Chinese-language films and garnered tremendous international acclaim. It was selected into the main competition section of the 53rd Berlin International Film Festival, nominated for Best Foreign Language Film at the 60th Golden Globe Awards and the 75th Academy Awards, and ranked first on Time magazine's list of the Top 10 Films of 2004. In the same year, Maggie Cheung graced the cover of Time, and the Nantes Three Continents Film Festival in France held a special retrospective titled "Maggie Cheung: A Unique Hong Kong Actress" to pay tribute to her.

In 2004, she won the Best Actress award at the Cannes Film Festival for her role as a mother who tries to kick her drug habit and reconcile with her long-lost son in Clean (2004). She is the first Asian actress to win this honor. In 2005, Clean was nominated for the Best Actress Award at the French César Awards.

=== 2005–present: Reduced work and retirement ===
After 2005, Cheung gradually reduced her film production and turned to music, art and other fields. During this period, she did not star in new feature films, but appeared in public view in the form of guest appearances or attending international activities. Until around 2013, she basically faded out of the film industry and focused on her personal life and cross-border creation.

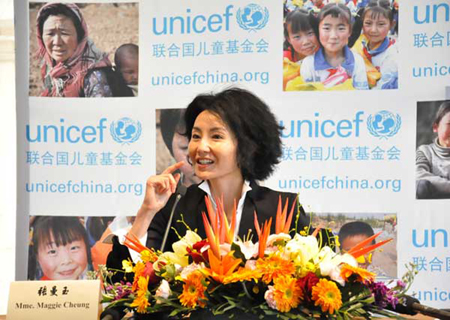
Cheung appointed UNICEF ambassador in 2010

In 2005, she won the artistic contribution award of the Montreal International Film Festival, and was selected as one of the "Top 100 Outstanding Actors of China Film in a Hundred Years" in the same year, and was awarded as "National First Class Actor".

In 2006, for the first time in the history of the 59th Cannes Film Festival (2006), the photographic image of an Asian actress, Cheung in In the Mood for Love, was used in official posters.

On 7 February 2007, The New York Times rated Cheung as one of the 22 Great Performers in 2006 for her Cannes winning role as Emily in Clean. In the same year, she won the Outstanding Contribution Award of Chinese in Shanghai International Film Festival.

After 20 years of making movies, she decided to retire from acting to pursue a career as a film composer. She had mentioned she would like to compose music and paint after having fulfilled her acting potential. Her last film appearance was as Mazu, Chinese goddess of the sea, in the film Ten Thousand Waves (2010) by British filmmaker and installation artist Isaac Julien. In the same year, Maggie Cheung served as UNICEF Ambassador to China and devoted herself to helping improve poverty-stricken areas in China.

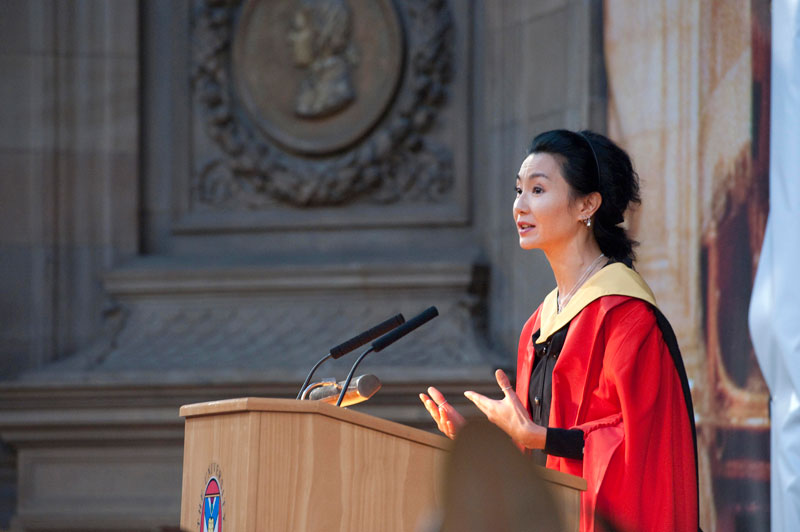
Cheung getting an honorary doctorate from the University of Edinburgh in 2011

In July 2011, she was awarded a doctor honoris causa at the University of Edinburgh. Cheung retired from acting in 2013 and has since kept a low profile. In November, at the kind invitation of director Hou Hsiao-hsien, Cheung returned to the ceremony where she won the Best Actress award for the first time as the ambassador of the 50th Golden Horse Award, and has never attended any award ceremony since then.

In April, 2014, the 33rd Hong Kong Film Awards screened the short film Light and Shadow of the Times, which was edited by Cheung. The short film briefly described the development of Hong Kong films, with the background of major historical events in contemporary Hong Kong.

In 2016, the Academy Film Archives and David Bordwell launched the "Maggie Cheung: Center Stage" retrospective series. Hailed as a classic icon of Chinese cinema, she has a body of work spanning East and West, blending classical charm with modern transnational elegance, and is internationally recognized as an iconic symbol of contemporary Chinese femininity. In 2017, she was invited to become a voting member of the Academy of Motion Picture Arts and Sciences (Oscar).

On April 17, 2024, just as the "100-day countdown to the Paris Olympic Games" and "the 60th anniversary of the establishment of diplomatic relations between China and France", Maggie Cheung was invited by the state to act as the ambassador of the "China-France Badminton Charity Festival" and attend the event together with Juliette Binoche.In September of the same year, the British Film Institute (BFI) held a large-scale solo film retrospective of Maggie Cheung in London, in commemoration of the 20th anniversary of her retirement from acting and her 60th birthday. The institute commented, "Her body of work is impressively diverse, and she is one of the most brilliant stars in the film industry."

== Retirement ==
In May 2014, Cheung performed at the 2014 Strawberry Music Festival (Shanghai and Beijing). On November 22, 2022, Cheung opened an account on Douyin, uploading video clips found while cleaning up old files on her computer. She wrote: "When I watched these videos again, I suddenly realized that time passed too fast." She occasionally shares old materials of her past work or life on the platform. On September 20, 2023, Cheung cooperated with OLAY brand again and appeared in the camera to shoot a short film. On September 3, 2024, GQ magazine published an article titled "Maggie Cheung Walked Away From Acting 20 Years Ago, but Her Legend Endures." Raymond Ang, writer of the article, tried to contact Cheung for an interview, but she declined to be interviewed. Ang said: "When I began work on this story in the spring, I reached out to Cheung's publicist of several years, trying to see if she might be open to doing an interview. It only took two weeks to get a polite but firm rejection. 'Ms. Cheung has decided not to participate in the interview', her publicist wrote in an email. 'She did not give a reason, but she's been turning down almost all press opportunities for quite awhile'."

She turned down BFI's invitation to participate in their 2024 retrospective as well. "It does add to the mystique," Kimberley Sheehan, the programmer of the retrospective, stated. "It's almost more fitting she's not coming."

In August 2025, Cheung created a public Xiaohongshu page, quickly amassing over one million followers after posting several short announcement videos for the page.

== Advertising endorsement ==
- 2001–2002 Jean-Louis Scherrer image ambassador
- 2003 Olay Global brand spokesperson
- 2005 Mandarin Oriental Hotel Group brand ambassador
- 2008–2009 Piaget Global brand ambassador

== Personal life ==
Cheung married French director Olivier Assayas in 1998; they divorced in 2001. She began a relationship with German architect Ole Scheeren in 2007. The relationship ended in 2011.

== Filmography ==
=== Film ===
| Year | English title | Chinese Title | Role | Notes/Ref. |
|---|---|---|---|---|
| 1984 | Prince Charming | 青蛙王子 | Kitty | |
| 1984 | Behind the Yellow Line | 緣份 | Monica | |
| 1985 | Girl with the Diamond Slipper | 摩登仙履奇緣 | Cheung Man Ju | |
| 1985 | Police Story | 警察故事 | May | |
| 1985 | It's a Drink, It's a Bomb | 聖誕奇遇結良緣 | Cat | |
| 1986 | Last Romance | 玫瑰的故事 | Rose Wong | |
| 1986 | Happy Ghost 3 | 開心鬼撞鬼 | Tsui Pan-Han | |
| 1986 | The Seventh Curse | 原振俠與衛斯理 | Tsui Hung | |
| 1987 | Seven Years Itch | 七年之癢 | Jogger in park | Cameo |
| 1987 | Sister Cupid | 天賜良緣 | Yuk | |
| 1987 | Heartbeat 100 | 心跳一百 | Maggie Cheung | |
| 1987 | The Romancing Star | 精裝追女仔 | Maggie Tung Man-yuk | |
| 1987 | Project A Part II | A計劃續集 | Maggie / Yesan | |
| 1987 | You Are My Destiny | 用愛捉伊人 | Sports car driver | Cameo |
| 1988 | Call Girl '88 | 應召女郎1988 | Jenny Lin | |
| 1988 | Love Soldier of Fortune | 愛的逃兵 | So See Dai | |
| 1988 | Paper Marriage | 過埠新娘 | Jade Lee | |
| 1988 | Double Fattiness | 雙肥臨門 | Diana | |
| 1988 | As Tears Go By | 旺角卡門 | Ngor | |
| 1988 | Mother vs. Mother | 南北媽打 | Betty | |
| 1988 | Moon, Star, Sun | 月亮星星太陽 | May | |
| 1988 | How to Pick Girls Up! | 求愛敢死隊 | Fanny | |
| 1988 | Police Story 2 | 警察故事續集 | May | |
| 1988 | Beloved Son of God | 肥貓流浪記 | Bibi Cheung | |
| 1988 | The Game They Call Sex | 黃色故事 | Chu Hsiao Min | |
| 1988 | Last Romance | 流金歲月 | Jiang Nan Sun | |
| 1989 | The Bachelor's Swan-Song | 再見王老五 | Cheung Yuk | |
| 1989 | Doubles Cause Troubles | 神勇雙妹嘜 | Zhu Ying Tai | |
| 1989 | My Dear Son | 我要富貴 | Chow Fung | |
| 1989 | The Iceman Cometh | 急凍奇俠 | Polly | |
| 1989 | A Fishy Story | 不脫襪的人 | Huang | |
| 1989 | Hearts No Flowers | 少女心 | Ms Tsang | |
| 1989 | Little Cop | 小小小警察 | Restaurant customer | Cameo |
| 1989 | In Between Loves | 求愛夜驚魂 | Jenny Tung | |
| 1989 | Full Moon in New York | 人在紐約 | Lee Fung-Jiau | |
| 1990 | Heart into Hearts | 三人新世界 | Joe | |
| 1990 | Song of the Exile | 客途秋恨 | Cheung Hueyin | |
| 1990 | The Dragon from Russia | 紅場飛龍 | May Yip | |
| 1990 | Red Dust | 滾滾紅塵 | Yueh-Feng | |
| 1990 | Farewell China | 愛在別鄉的季節 | Li Hong | |
| 1990 | Days of Being Wild | 阿飛正傳 | Su Lizhen | |
| 1991 | The Perfect Match | 富貴吉祥 | Carrie Kam | |
| 1991 | Alan & Eric: Between Hello and Goodbye | 雙城故事 | Olive Cheung | |
| 1991 | Will of Iron | 黑雪 | Maggie | |
| 1991 | Today's Hero | 志在出位 | Annie | |
| 1991 | Center Stage | 阮玲玉 | Ruan Lingyu | |
| 1991 | The Banquet | 豪門夜宴 | Personal Singing Instructor | Cameo |
| 1992 | Twin Dragons | 雙龍會 | Barbara | |
| 1992 | All's Well, Ends Well | 家有喜事 | Holli-yuk | |
| 1992 | What a Hero! | 譁! 英雄 | Lan | |
| 1992 | Heart Against Hearts | 三人做世界 | Joe | Cameo |
| 1992 | Police Story 3: Supercop | 警察故事3: 超級警察 | May | |
| 1992 | New Dragon Gate Inn | 新龍門客棧 | Jade | |
| 1992 | Rose | 白玫瑰 | Rose Chin | |
| 1992 | True Love | 真的愛妳 | Angel | |
| 1992 | Moon Warriors | 戰神傳說 | Mo-sin | |
| 1993 | Millionaire Cop | 千面天王 | Jacky Cheuk | |
| 1993 | The Eagle Shooting Heroes | 東成西就 | Imperial Master | |
| 1993 | The Heroic Trio | 東方三俠 | Chat / Thief Catcher | |
| 1993 | First Shot | 廉政第一擊 | Annie Ma | |
| 1993 | The Bare-Footed Kid | 赤腳小子 | Pak Siu-kwan | |
| 1993 | Flying Dagger | 神經刀與飛天貓 | Flying Cat | |
| 1993 | Holy Weapon | 武俠七公主 | Princess Tin Heung | |
| 1993 | Enigma of Love | 飛越謎情 | Tammy Cheung | |
| 1993 | Mad Monk | 濟公 | Bai Xiao Yu | |
| 1993 | Boys Are Easy | 追男仔 | Ching Siu Nam | |
| 1993 | Executioners | 現代豪俠傳 | Chat / Thief Catcher / Chelsea | |
| 1993 | Green Snake | 青蛇 | Green Snake | |
| 1994 | In Between | 新同居時代 | Coco Lau | Segment: "Unwed Mother" |
| 1994 | Ashes of Time | 東邪西毒 | Ouyang Feng's sister-in-law | |
| 1996 | Irma Vep | 迷离劫/迷離劫 | Herself | |
| 1996 | Comrades: Almost a Love Story | 甜蜜蜜 | Li Qiao | |
| 1997 | The Soong Sisters | 宋家皇朝 | Soong Ching-ling | |
| 1997 | Chinese Box | 中国匣 | Jean | |
| 1999 | Augustin, King of Kung-Fu | 爱在异乡的故事 | Ling | |
| 2000 | Sausalito | 一見鍾情 | Ellen | |
| 2000 | In the Mood for Love | 花樣年華 | Su Li-zhen | |
| 2002 | Hero | 英雄 | Flying Snow | |
| 2004 | Clean | 錯得多美麗 | Emily Wang | |
| 2004 | 2046 | 2046 | Su Li-zhen | |
| 2009 | Inglourious Basterds | 惡棍特工 | Madame Ada Mimieux | Deleted scene |
| 2010 | Hot Summer Days | 全城熱戀 | Crying woman | Cameo |

Short film

| Year | English title | Chinese Title | Role | Ref. |
|---|---|---|---|---|
| 1992 | Too Happy for Words | 兩個女人，一個靚，一個唔靚 | —N/a | |
| 2010 | Ten Thousand Waves | 萬層浪 | Mazu | |

=== Television ===
| Year | English title | Original Title |
|---|---|---|
| 1984 | Rainbow Round My Shoulder | 畫出彩虹 |
| 1984 | Police Cadet '84 | 新紮師兄 |
| 1985 | The Fallen Family | 武林世家 |
| 1985 | Zhe Dang Pai Dang | 拆擋拍擋 |
| 1985 | The Yang's Saga | 楊家將 |
| 1985 | The Feud That Never Was | 拆档拍档 |

== Awards and nominations ==
| Year | Category | Award | Nominated work | Result |
|---|---|---|---|---|
| 1985 | Best New Performer | Hong Kong Film Awards | Behind the Yellow Line | Won |
| 1989 | Best Actress | Hong Kong Film Awards | As Tears Go By | Nominated |
| 1989 | Best Actress | Golden Horse Awards | Full Moon in New York | Won |
| 1990 | Best Supporting Actress | Golden Horse Awards | Red Dust | Won |
| 1990 | Best Actress | Hong Kong Film Awards | A Fishy Story | Won |
| 1990 | Feature Film | Torino International Festival of Young Cinema | Farewell | Won |
| 1991 | Best Actress | Golden Horse Awards | Center Stage | Won |
| 1991 | Best Actress | Hong Kong Film Awards | Farewell China | Nominated |
| 1991 | Best Supporting Actress | Hong Kong Film Awards | Red Dust | Nominated |
| 1992 | Best Actress | Berlin International Film Festival | Center Stage | Won |
| 1992 | Best Actress | Chicago International Film Festival | Center Stage | Won |
| 1992 | Best Actress-Foreign | Japan Movie Critics Award | Center Stage | Won |
| 1992 | Best Actress | Golden Horse Awards | Dragon Inn | Nominated |
| 1993 | Best Actress | Hong Kong Film Awards | Center Stage | Won |
| 1993 | Best Actress | Hong Kong Film Awards | Dragon Inn | Nominated |
| 1997 | Best Actress | Hong Kong Film Awards | Comrades: Almost a Love Story | Won |
| 1997 | Best Actress | Golden Horse Awards | Comrades: Almost a Love Story | Won |
| 1997 | Best Actress | Hong Kong Film Critics Society Awards | Comrades: Almost a Love Story | Won |
| 1997 | Best Actress | Golden Bauhinia Awards | Comrades: Almost a Love Story | Won |
| 1997 | Best Actress | Asia-Pacific Film Festival | Comrades: Almost a Love Story | Won |
| 1998 | Best Actress | Hong Kong Film Awards | The Soong Sisters | Won |
| 1998 | Best Actress | Golden Bauhinia Awards | The Soong Sisters | Nominated |
| 2000 | Best Actress | Asia-Pacific Film Festival | In the Mood for Love | Nominated |
| 2000 | Best Actress | Hong Kong Film Critics Society Awards | In the Mood for Love | Nominated |
| 2000 | Best Actress | Golden Horse Awards | In the Mood for Love | Won |
| 2001 | Best Actress | Golden Bauhinia Awards | In the Mood for Love | Nominated |
| 2001 | Best Actress | Hong Kong Film Awards | In the Mood for Love | Won |
| 2001 | Best Actress | Durban International Film Festival | In the Mood for Love | Won |
| 2001 | Best Actress | Chinese Film Media Awards | In the Mood for Love | Won |
| 2002 | Best Foreign Actress | SESC Film Festival, Brazil | In the Mood for Love | Won |
| 2002 | Best Actress | Chlotrudis Awards | In the Mood for Love | Nominated |
| 2003 | Best Actress | Golden Bauhinia Awards | Hero | Nominated |
| 2003 | Best Actress | Hong Kong Film Awards | Hero | Nominated |
| 2003 | Best Actress | Asian Film Critics Association Awards | Hero | Nominated |
| 2003 | The most popular actress in Hong Kong | Chinese Film Media Awards | Hero | Won |
| 2004 | Achievement in Acting | Hawaii International Film Festival | Maggie Cheung | Won |
| 2004 | Best Actress | Cannes Film Festival | Clean | Won |
| 2005 | Grand Prix Special des Amériques | Montréal World Film Festival | Maggie Cheung | Won |
| 2005 | Best Supporting Actress | Italian Online Movie Awards (IOMA) | Hero | Nominated |
| 2005 | Best Actress | César Awards, France | Clean | Nominated |
| 2007 | Outstanding Contribution to Chinese Cinema | Shanghai International Film Festival | Maggie Cheung | Won |
| 2007 | Best Actress | Chlotrudis Awards | Clean | Nominated |
| 2020 | National Top 10 Film Actress | Huading Award | Maggie Cheung | Won |
| 2022 | OFTA Film Hall of Fame | Online Film & Television Association | Maggie Cheung | Won |

== See also ==
- Cinema of Hong Kong
