= Anthony Chan (actor) =

Hong Kong actor and drummer

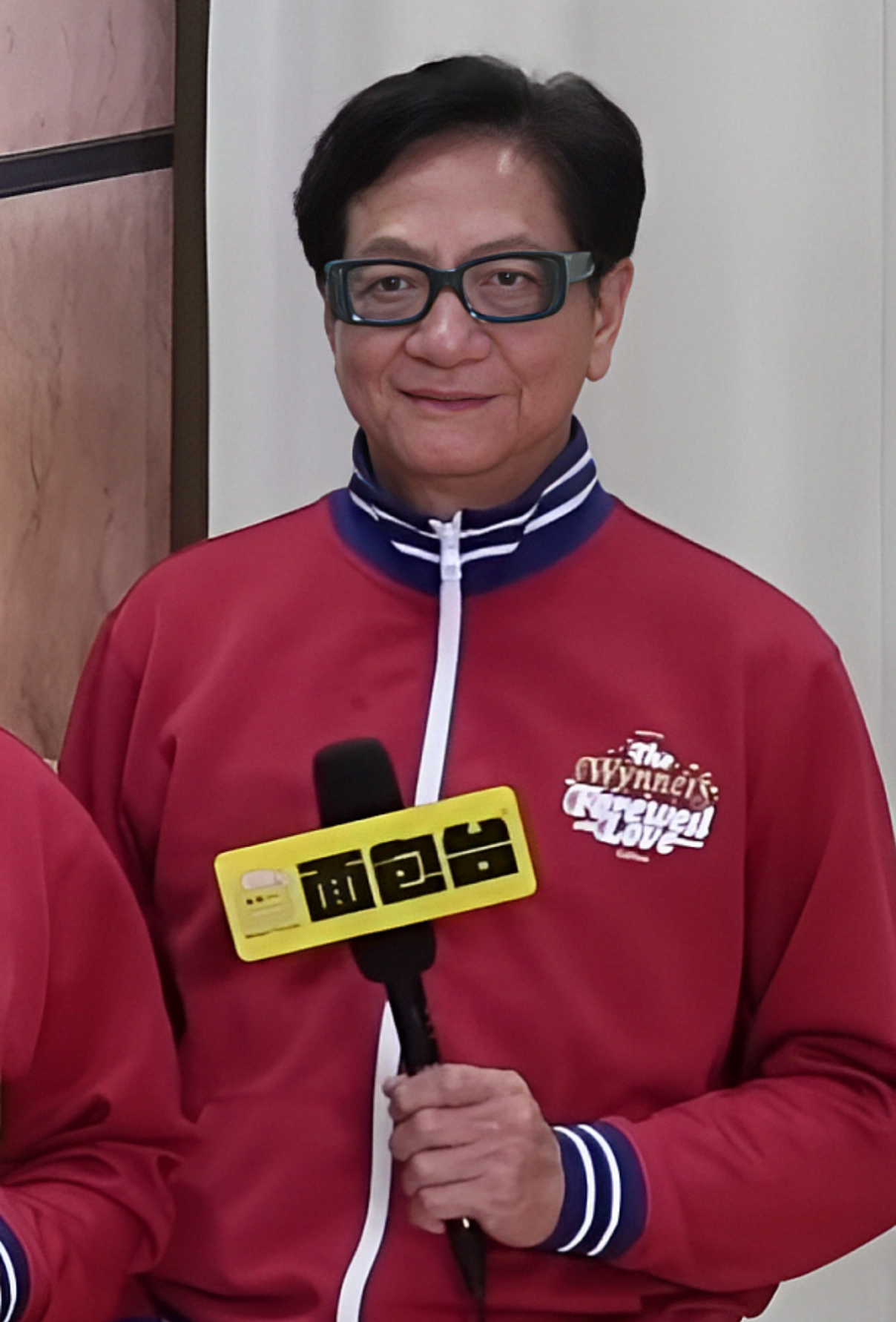
- Chan in August 2023
- Born: 陳志濤 (Chan Chi To); 1 October 1952 (age 73); Hong Kong

Chinese name
- Traditional Chinese: 陳友
- Simplified Chinese: 陈友
Transcriptions
Standard Mandarin
- Hanyu Pinyin: Chén Yǒu

Anthony Chan Yau (Chinese: 陳友, born 1 October 1952) is a Hong Kong actor and the drummer for the band Wynners.

== Filmography ==
- Enter the Fat Dragon (2020)
- Ciao UFO (2019)
- House of the Rising Sons (2018)
- The Yuppie Fantasia 3 (2017)
- Rigor Mortis (2013)
- Paris Holiday (2015)
- When Fortune Smiles (1990)
- A Fishy Story (1989)
- One Husband Too Many (1988)
- Mr. Vampire IV (1988)
- Mr. Vampire (1985)
- Behind the Yellow Line (1984)
