= 4th Hong Kong Film Awards =

1985 Hong Kong Film Awards

- Date: 13 April 1985
- Hosted by: Winnie Yu

The 4th Hong Kong Film Awards ceremony, honored the best films of 1984 and took place on 13 April 1985, at the Furama Hong Kong Hotel, Hong Kong. The ceremony was hosted by Winnie Yu, during the ceremony awards are presented in 14 categories. The ceremony was sponsored by City Entertainment Magazine.

== Awards ==
Winners are listed first, highlighted in boldface, and indicated with a double dagger (‡).

**Best Film**: **Yim Ho — Homecoming**‡; Po-Chih Leong — Hong Kong 1941; Johnny Mak — Long Arm of the Law; Tsui Hark — Shanghai Blues	**Best Director**: **Yim Ho — Homecoming**‡; Tsui Hark — Shanghai Blues; Johnny Mak — Long Arm of the Law; Po-Chih Leong — Hong Kong 1941; Danny Lee — Law with Two Phases
**Best Actor**: **Danny Lee — Law with Two Phases**‡; Chow Yun-Fat — Hong Kong 1941; Kent Cheng — Beloved Daddy; Michael Hui — Teppanyaki; Jackie Chan — Project A	**Best Actress**: **Siqin Gaowa — Homecoming**‡; Sylvia Chang — Shanghai Blues; Josephine Koo — Homecoming; Cecilia Yip — Hong Kong 1941; Deannie Yip — Wrong Wedding Trail
**Best Supporting Actor**: **Wai Shum — Long Arm of the Law**‡; Chor Yuen — Cherie; Tai Bo — Law with Two Phases; Cheung Kwok-Chu — An Amorous Woman of Tang Dynasty; Anthony Chan — Behind the Yellow Line	**Best Supporting Actress**: **Anita Mui — Behind the Yellow Line**‡; Loletta Lee — Shanghai Blues; Lam Hoi-Ling — An Amorous Woman of Tang Dynasty; Chiu Hau — Love in a Fallen City; Yu Sin — Hong Kong 1941
**Best New Performer**: **Josephine Koo — Homecoming**‡; Loletta Lee — Shanghai Blues; Dan Lin — Long Arm of the Law; Cheung Lai-Ping — Pale Passion; Maggie Cheung — Behind the Yellow Line	**Best Screenplay**: **Liang Kong — Homecoming**‡; Michael Hui — Teppanyaki; John Chan — Hong Kong 1941; Philip Chan — Long Arm of the Law; Manfred Wong — Everlasting Love
**Best Cinematography**: **Brian Lai — Hong Kong 1941**‡; Hang-Sang Poon — Homecoming; Kwok Wah Koo — Long Arm of the Law; Tony Hope — Love in a Fallen City; Man Fai Chan — A Certain Romance	**Best Film Editing**: **Yao Chung Chang — Long Arm of the Law**‡; Siu Sum Chew — Shanghai Blues; Kin Kin — Homecoming; Yao Chung Chang — Hong Kong 1941
**Best Art Direction**: **William Chang — Homecoming**‡; Tony Au — Love in a Fallen City; Jim Lam Yim — A Certain Romance; Hing Yee Ah Yeung — Shanghai Blues; King Man Lee — An Amorous Woman of Tang Dynasty	**Best Action Choreography**: **Jackie Chan's Stuntman Association — Project A**‡; Sammo Hung's Stuntman Association — The Dead and the Deadly; Jackie Chan's Stuntman Association — Wheels on Meals; Billy Chan — Long Arm of the Law; Lau Kar-Leung — The 8 Diagram Pole Fighter
**Best Original Film Score**: **Lam Man-Yi — Love in a Fallen City**‡; Hei Doh-Long — Homecoming; Lam Mo-Tak — Long Arm of the Law; James Wong — Shanghai Blues; Shum Sing-Tak — An Amorous Woman of Tang Dynasty	**Best Original Film Song**: **"Chance Meeting" — A Certain Romance**; **Composer: Lee Nga-Song**; **Lyrics: Cheng Kwok-Kong**; **Singer: Lam Chi-Mei**‡; "Shanghai Blues" — Shanghai Blues; Composer/Lyrics: James Wong; Singer: Sally Yeh; "幻影" — Esprit d'amour; Composer: Lam Man Yee; Lyrics: Lam Man-Cheung; Singer: Alan Tam; "偶遇" — Homecoming; Composer: Hei Doh-Long; Lyrics: Cheng Kwok-Kong; Singer: Anita Mui; "Root of Love" — The Other Side of Gentleman; Composer: Chan Fei-Lap; Lyrics: Lam Man-Chung; Singer: Alan Tam
