= 15th Hong Kong Film Awards =

1996 Hong Kong Film Awards

- Date: 28 April 1996
- Site: Hong Kong Cultural Centre
- Hosted by: Sandra Ng, Dayo Wong and Veronica Yip

The 15th Hong Kong Film Awards ceremony, honored the best films of 1995 and took place on 28 April 1996 at Hong Kong Academy for Performing Arts, Wan Chai, Hong Kong. The ceremony was hosted by Sandra Ng, Dayo Wong and Veronica Yip, during the ceremony awards are presented in 15 categories.

== Awards ==
Winners are listed first, highlighted in boldface, and indicated with a double dagger (‡).

**Best Film**: **Summer Snow**‡; The Day the Sun Turned Cold; Full Throttle; Fallen Angels; Rumble in the Bronx	**Best Director**: **Ann Hui — Summer Snow**‡; Derek Yee — Full Throttle; Wong Kar-wai — Fallen Angels; Yim Ho — The Day the Sun Turned Cold; Johnnie To — Loving You
**Best Screenplay**: **Chan Man Keung — Summer Snow**‡; Derek Yee and Law Chi-leung — Full Throttle; Jeffrey Lau — A Chinese Odyssey Part 1: Pandora's Box; Jeffrey Lau — A Chinese Odyssey Part 2: Cinderella; Raymond To — The Umbrella Story	**Best Actor**: **Roy Chiao — Summer Snow**‡; Andy Lau — Full Throttle; Steven Chow — A Chinese Odyssey Part 2: Cinderella; Chow Yun-fat — Peace Hotel; Jackie Chan — Rumble in the Bronx
**Best Actress**: **Josephine Siao — Summer Snow**‡; Fung Bo Bo — Mother of a Different Kind; Chingmy Yau — I'm Your Birthday Cake; Cecilia Yip — Peace Hotel; Anita Mui — Rumble in the Bronx	**Best Supporting Actor**: **Law Kar-ying — Summer Snow**‡; Chin Kar-lok — Full Throttle; Jordan Chan — Heaven Can't Wait; Eric Kot — Love in the Time of Twilight; Dayo Wong — The Day That Doesn't Exist
**Best Supporting Actress**: **Karen Mok — Fallen Angels**‡; Law Koon Lan — Summer Snow; Law Koon Lan — The Umbrella Story; Ha Ping — Full Throttle; Francoise Yip — Rumble in the Bronx	**Best New Performer**: **Eric Moo — Those Were the Days...**‡; Kelly Chen — Whatever Will Be, Will Be; Chan Man Lai — Fallen Angels; Allen Ting — Summer Snow; Gigi Leung — Full Throttle; Francoise Yip — Rumble in the Bronx
**Best Cinematography**: **Christopher Doyle — Fallen Angels**‡; Wong Wing Hang — Peace Hotel; Peter Pau — The Phantom Lover; Arthur Wong — A Touch of Evil; Andrew Lau — I'm Your Birthday Cake	**Best Art Direction**: **Ma Poon Chiu — The Phantom Lover**‡; Kenneth Yee and Alfred Yau — Peace Hotel; William Chang — Fallen Angels; Yank Wong — Summer Snow; Ma Poon Chiu — The Christ of Nanjing
**Best Costume Make Up Design**: **William Chang and Yeung Sin Ling** **— The Phantom Lover**‡; Dora Ng — Peace Hotel; William Chang — Fallen Angels; William Chang — The Blade; Eddie Mok — The Christ of Nanjing	**Best Action Direction**: **Stanley Tong and Jackie Chan — Rumble in the Bronx**‡; Yuen Bun, Mung Hoi and Stephen Tung — The Blade; Jackie Chan Stunt Team, Sammo Hung Stunt Team — Thunderbolt; Corey Yuen, Yuen Tak — My Father is a Hero; Bruce Law — Full Throttle
**Best Film Editing**: **Kwong Chi Leung — Full Throttle**‡; Peter Cheung — Rumble in the Bronx; Wong Yee Shun — Summer Snow; David Wu Dai Wai — The Phantom Lover; William Chang and Wong Ming Lam — Fallen Angels	**Best Original Film Score**: **Frankie Chan and Roel Garcia — Fallen Angels**‡; Cacine Wong, Healthy Poon — Peace Hotel; Clarence Hui, Joseph Wong Wai Nin, Ronald Ng — The Golden Girls; Chris Babida — The Phantom Lover; Wu Wai Lap, Raymond Wong — Love in the Time of Twilight
**Best Original Film Song**: **Composer: Alex San • Lyrics: Erica Lee • Singer: Cass Phang — Peace Hotel**‡; Composer: Chan Chi Hung • Lyrics/Singer: Andy Lau — Full Throttle; Composer/Singer: Leslie Cheung • Lyrics: Leslie Mok — The Phantom Lover; Composer: Mark Lui • Lyrics: Chow Lai Mau • Singer: Kelly Chen — Whatever Will Be, Will Be; Composer: John Laudon • Lyrics: Erica Lee • Singer: Kevin Cheng — Hong Kong Graffiti
