= Hong Kong Film Award for Best Cinematography =

Annual Chinese film award

- Awarded for: Achievement in cinematography
- Country: Hong Kong
- Presented by: Hong Kong Film Awards
- First award: 1983
- Currently held by: Cheng Siu-Keung (2022)

The Hong Kong Film Award for Best Cinematography is an annual Hong Kong industry award presented to a cinematographer or a group of cinematographers for the best achievement in cinematography.

== History ==
The award was established at the 2nd Hong Kong Film Awards (1983) and the first winner in this category was Arthur Wong for his contribution in the cinematography of He Lives by Night. Arthur Wong was also honoured at the 28th Hong Kong Film Awards (2009) for the film Painted Skin. Arthur Wong holds the record for the most awards in this category with 8 wins.

== Winners and nominees ==
Year	Nominee	Film	Note
1983 (2nd)	Arthur Wong	He Lives by Night	
1983 (2nd)	Lai Sui-Ming, David Chung Chi-Man	Coolie Killer	
1983 (2nd)	Wong Chung-Biu	Nomad	
1983 (2nd)	Tong Bo-Sang	Lonely Fifteen	
1983 (2nd)	Arthur Wong	Life After Life	
1983 (2nd)	Ma Yin-Tat, Poon Ching-Fuk, Wong Seung-Hoi, Yu Hoi	Shaolin Temple	
1984 (3rd)	Wong Chung-Biu	The Last Affair	
1984 (3rd)	Siu Yuen-Chi, Chan Chun-Kit, Peter Ngor, Lam Ah-To, Arthur Wong	Heath Warning	
1984 (3rd)	Koo Kwok-Wah	All the Wrong Spies	
1984 (3rd)	Chan Ngok-Yi	Ah Ying	
1984 (3rd)	Tong Bo-Sang, Yeung Lam	Burning of the Imperial Palace	
1985 (4th)	Lai Sui-Ming	Hong Kong 1941	
1985 (4th)	Poon Hang-Sang	Homecoming	
1985 (4th)	Ho Tung-Nei	Love in a Fallen City	
1985 (4th)	Koo Kwok-Wah	Long Arm of the Law	
1985 (4th)	Chan Man-Fai	A Certain Romance	
1986 (5th)	Poon Hang-Sang	The Island	
1986 (5th)	Wong Chung-Biu	Women	
1986 (5th)	Peter Ngor	Mr. Vampire	
1986 (5th)	Lam Ah-To	Infatuation	
1986 (5th)	Cheung Yiu-Cho	Police Story	
1987 (6th)	Christopher Doyle	Soul	
1987 (6th)	Wong Wing-Hang	A Better Tomorrow	
1987 (6th)	Wong Chung-Biu	Dream Lovers	
1987 (6th)	Poon Hang-Sang	Peking Opera Blues	
1987 (6th)	Chan Lok-Yi, Chan Ping-Lam	Just Like Weather	
1988 (7th)	James Hayman & David Chung Chi-Man	An Autumn's Tale	
1988 (7th)	Peter Pau	Legend of Wu	
1988 (7th)	Sai Muk Siu Yi	The Romance of Book and Sword	
1988 (7th)	Lam Kwok-Wah	Final Victory	
1988 (7th)	Poon Hang-Sang, Lee Ka-Ko, Lau Moon-Tong, Wong Wing-Hang	A Chinese Ghost Story	
1989 (8th)	David Chung	Painted Faces	
1989 (8th)	Andrew Lau	As Tears Go By	
1989 (8th)	Peter Pau, Poon Hang-Sang	The Story of Hay Bo	
1989 (8th)	Wong Chung-Biu	Profile of Pleasure	
1989 (8th)	Wong Chung-Biu	Rouge	
1990 (9th)	Peter Pau	A Fishy Story	
1990 (9th)	Christopher Doyle	Her Beautiful Life Lies	
1990 (9th)	Wong Wing-Hang, Peter Pau	The Killer	
1990 (9th)	Wong Chung-Biu	Eight Taels of Gold	
1990 (9th)	Poon Hang-Sang	The Iceman Cometh	
1991 (10th)	Christopher Doyle	Days of Being Wild	
1991 (10th)	Lam Kwok-Wah, Chan Pui-Ka, Wong Wing-Hang, Som Chai Kittikun	Bullet in the Head	
1991 (10th)	Jingle Ma	Kawashima Yoshiko	
1991 (10th)	Jingle Ma	Farewell China	
1991 (10th)	Peter Pau, Lee San-Yip	The Terracotta Warrior	
1991 (10th)	Poon Hang-Sang	Red Dust	
1992 (11th)	Peter Pau	Saviour of the Soul	
1992 (11th)	David Chung Chi-Man, Wong Chung-Biu, Arthur Wong, Lam Kwok-Wah, Chan Tung-Chuen, Chan Pui-Ka	Once Upon a Time in China	
1992 (11th)	Andrew Lau, Lee Chi-Hang	Lee Rock	
1992 (11th)	Peter Pau	Bury Me High	
1992 (11th)	Wong Chung-Biu, David Chung Chi-Man, Peter Pau, Peter Ngor	Au Revoir Mon Amour	
1993 (12th)	Poon Hang-Sang	Center Stage	
1993 (12th)	David Chung Chi-Man	King of Beggars	
1993 (12th)	Lee Tak-Sing	Misty	
1993 (12th)	Arthur Wong	Once Upon a Time in China II	
1993 (12th)	Arthur Wong, Lau Moon-Tong	New Dragon Gate Inn	
1994 (13th)	Peter Pau	The Bride with White Hair	
1994 (13th)	David Chung, Peter Ngor	Finale in Blood	
1994 (13th)	Wong Chung-Biu	Roof with a View	
1994 (13th)	Arthur Wong	Days of Tomorrow	
1994 (13th)	Arthur Wong, Andrew Leslie	Temptation of a Monk	
1995 (14th)	Christopher Doyle	Ashes of Time	
1995 (14th)	Christopher Doyle, Andrew Lau	Chungking Express	
1995 (14th)	Peter Pau	Treasure Hunt	
1995 (14th)	Cheung Tong-Leung	What Price Survival	
1995 (14th)	Arthur Wong	The Returning	
1996 (15th)	Christopher Doyle	Fallen Angels	
1996 (15th)	Wong Wing-Hang	Peace Hotel	
1996 (15th)	Peter Pau	The Phantom Lover	
1996 (15th)	Arthur Wong	A Touch of Evil	
1996 (15th)	Andrew Lau	I'm Your Birthday Cake	
1997 (16th)	Jingle Ma	Comrades: Almost a Love Story	
1997 (16th)	Christopher Doyle	Temptress Moon	
1997 (16th)	Poon Hang-Sang	Shanghai Grand	
1997 (16th)	Arthur Wong	Somebody Up There Likes Me	
1997 (16th)	Arthur Wong	Big Bullet	
1998 (17th)	Arthur Wong	The Soong Sisters	
1998 (17th)	Cheung Man-Biu	Downtown Torpedoes	
1998 (17th)	Christopher Doyle	Happy Together	
1998 (17th)	Mark Lee Ping Bin	Eighteen Springs	
1998 (17th)	Wong Wing	Too Many Ways to Be No. 1	
1999 (18th)	Arthur Wong	Sleepless Town	
1999 (18th)	Kwan Bun-Leung	Hold You Tight	
1999 (18th)	Andrew Lau	The Storm Riders	
1999 (18th)	Jingle Ma	City of Glass	
1999 (18th)	Peter Pau	Anna Madaglena	
2000 (19th)	Arthur Wong	Purple Storm	
2000 (19th)	Ross W. Clarkson	The Victim	
2000 (19th)	Jingle Ma, Chan Kwok-Hung	Fly Me to Polaris	
2000 (19th)	Peter Pau	Metade Fumaca	
2000 (19th)	Arthur Wong	Gen-X Cops	
2001 (20th)	Peter Pau	Crouching Tiger, Hidden Dragon	
2001 (20th)	Christopher Doyle, Mark Lee Ping Bin	In the Mood for Love	
2001 (20th)	Keung Kwok-Man	A Fighter's Blues	
2001 (20th)	Kwan Boon-Leung	Lavender	
2001 (20th)	Jingle Ma, Chan Kwok-Hung	Summer Holiday	
2002 (21st)	Arthur Wong	Visible Secret	
2002 (21st)	Kwan Pak-Suen, Kwong Ting-Wo	Shaolin Soccer	
2002 (21st)	Chung Yau-Ting	Peony Pavilion	
2002 (21st)	Peter Pau	Beijing Rocks	
2002 (21st)	Yeung To, Cheung Kin	Lan Yu	
2003 (22nd)	Christopher Doyle	Hero	
2003 (22nd)	Christopher Doyle	Three: Going Home	
2003 (22nd)	Andrew Lau, Lai Yiu-Fai	Infernal Affairs	
2003 (22nd)	Peter Pau	The Touch	
2003 (22nd)	Arthur Wong	Double Vision	
2004 (23rd)	Arthur Wong	The Floating Landscape	
2004 (23rd)	Cheng Siu-Keung	PTU	
2004 (23rd)	Andrew Lau, Ng Man-Ching	Infernal Affairs II	
2004 (23rd)	Andrew Lau, Ng Man-Ching	Infernal Affairs III	
2004 (23rd)	Poon Liu-Ming	Heroic Duo	
2005 (24th)	Christopher Doyle, Lai Yiu-Fai, Kwan Pun-Leung	2046	
2005 (24th)	Christopher Doyle	Dumplings	
2005 (24th)	Poon Hang-Sang	Kung Fu Hustle	
2005 (24th)	Poon Yiu-Ming	Leaving Me Loving You	
2005 (24th)	Geung Kwok-Man	One Nite in Mongkok	
2006 (25th)	Peter Pau	Perhaps Love	
2006 (25th)	Cheng Siu-Keung	Election	
2006 (25th)	Andrew Lau, Lai Yiu-Fai, Ng Man-Ching	House of Fury	
2006 (25th)	Peter Pau	The Promise	
2006 (25th)	Venus Keung Kwok-Man	Seven Swords	
2007 (26th)	Andrew Lau & Lai Yiu-Fai	Confession of Pain	
2007 (26th)	Mark Lee Ping Bin	After This Our Exile	
2007 (26th)	Charlie Lam	Isabella	
2007 (26th)	Cheng Siu-Keung	Exiled	
2007 (26th)	Zhao Xiaoding	Curse of the Golden Flower	
2008 (27th)	Arthur Wong	The Warlords	
2008 (27th)	Cheng Siu-Keung	Mad Detective	
2008 (27th)	Charlie Lam Chi-Kin	Exodus	
2008 (27th)	Kwan Pun-Leung, Yu Lik-Wai	The Postmodern Life of My Aunt	
2008 (27th)	Venus Keung Kwok-Man	Protégé	
2009 (28th)	Arthur Wong	Painted Skin	
2009 (28th)	O Sing-Pui	Ip Man	
2009 (28th)	Lu Yue, Zhang Li	Red Cliff	
2009 (28th)	Cheung Tung-Leung	Three Kingdoms: Resurrection of the Dragon	
2009 (28th)	Cheng Siu-Keung	Sparrow	
2010 (29th)	Arthur Wong	Bodyguards and Assassins	
2010 (29th)	Anthony Pun	Empire Of Silver	
2010 (29th)	Lu Yue & Zhang Li	Red Cliff II	
2010 (29th)	Chin Ting-chang	Prince of Tears	
2010 (29th)	Nobuyasu Kita	Shinjuku Incident	
2022 (40th)	Cheng Siu-Keung	Limbo	
2022 (40th)	Rick Lau	Hand Rolled Cigarette	
2022 (40th)	Fung Yuen Man	Raging Fire	
2022 (40th)	Anthony Pun	Anita	
2022 (40th)	Christopher Doyle, Kubbie Tsoi	Love After Love	
2023 (41st)	Cheng Siu-Keung	Detective vs Sleuths	
2023 (41st)	Leung Yau Cheong	The Sparring Partner	
2023 (41st)	Ng Kai Ming	Warriors of Future	
2023 (41st)	Chin Ting-chang, Meng Qing, Tsui Siu Kong	Where the Wind Blows	
2023 (41st)	Meteor Cheung Yu Hon	The Narrow Road	

== See also ==
- Hong Kong Film Award
- Hong Kong Film Award for Best Actor
- Hong Kong Film Award for Best Actress
- Hong Kong Film Award for Best Supporting Actor
- Hong Kong Film Award for Best Supporting Actress
- Hong Kong Film Award for Best Action Choreography
- Hong Kong Film Award for Best Director
- Hong Kong Film Award for Best Film
- Hong Kong Film Award for Best New Performer
