= Chris Babida =

Chinese musician and composer

Chris Babida is a Hong Kong composer, arranger, conductor, music director and record producer. He has also done numerous film soundtracks. His film work includes Dragon Force which was released in 1982, Happy Sixteen also released in 1982, Sworn Brothers which was released in 1987, Armour of God II: Operation Condor which was released in 1991, C'est la vie, mon chéri which was released in 1993 and Bishonen which was released in 1998. He has produced albums for Andy Bautista, Sam Sorono and Mona Richardson. At the 15th Hong Kong Film Awards, he won an award in the Best Original Film Score category for The Phantom Lover.

== Background ==
By 2015, Babida had composed at least 50 film scores. He is of Filipino descent. He married actress and singer Betty Chung (Chinese: 鍾玲玲) but then divorced.

== Film work ==
=== 1980s ===
One of the early films he worked on was the Po-Chih Leong directed film You ni mei ni which starred Paul Che, Ching Yee Chong and Lee Chun-Wa. The film was released in 1980. He provided music for the Michael Mak directed martial arts film Dragon Force which starred Bruce Baron, Frances Fong, Sam Sorono and Bruce Li.

=== 2000s ===
He provided music for the 2016 film, The Last Race which was directed by Stephen Shin and Michael Parker.

== Production ==
Productions
Artist	Album title	Release	Year	Notes #
Andy Bautista	Best Disco In Town	The Gramophone Company Of India Ltd. EMC-E 1043	1977	
Sam Sorono	Sam Sorono Sings Tom Jones' Greatest Hits	EMI SPR 1002	1978	
Mona Richardson	Disco Dazzler	EMI EMGS 6054	1979	
梅艷芳	淑女	Capital Artists CAL-04-1079	1989	
梅艷芳	Brasil	Capital Artists CAL-04-1087	1989	
Geoff Chang 張信哲	Generossity 寬容	EMI (Taiwan) ED-5029	1995	
蔡琴	沒有男人的房子不算家 / 天使不夜城 歌舞劇原聲帶	Warner Music Taiwan 3984-26698-2	1999	
鮑比達 & 蔡琴 aka Chris Babida & Tsai Chin	遇見	Better Music Corp. BM10005H		
