= Happy Sixteen =

1982 Hong Kong film by Michael Mak

- VHS cover
- Directed by: Michael Mak
- Written by: Manfred Wong
- Produced by: Johnny Mak
- Starring: Irene Wan; Ng Nga-Ting; Peter Mak; Hong Wai-Lun
- Cinematography: Gray Hoh
- Edited by: Yiu Chung Yeung
- Music by: Chris Babida
- Production companies: Johnny Mak Productions; Pearl City Films
- Release date: 1 December 1982 (Hong Kong)
- Running time: 90 minutes
- Country: Hong Kong
- Language: Cantonese
- Box office: HK $4,036,023.00

Happy Sixteen (俏皮女學生, Chiu pei nui hok sang) is a 1982 Hong Kong film directed by Michael Mak Dong-Git.

== Synopsis ==
The film is about the life of a group of sixteen year olds who have fun hanging out, dancing and partying etc.. In amongst this, the teenagers play pranks on a biology teacher who wakes up in a meadow. The plot also involves a love triangle.

== Cast ==
Cast
Name	Role
Irene Wan	Irene
Ng Nga-Ting	April
Peter Mak	Peter
Hong Wai-Lun	Alice
Lo Wai-Yee	
Roy Chiao Hung	
Lau Hak-Suen	Principal
Leung Biu-Ching	
Yue Tau-Wan	Rapist
Patrick Lung Kong	
John Shum	
Helen Au	
Wan Gam-Cheong	
Kobe Wong	
Sam Sorono	
Wong Tak-Fat	Boy
Terry Tong	

== Reception ==
=== Awards ===
2nd Hong Kong Film Awards

- Won: Best Original Film Song
- Nominated: Best New Performer - Irene Wan
