= Hang Sang Poon =

Hong Kong-Canadian cinematographer

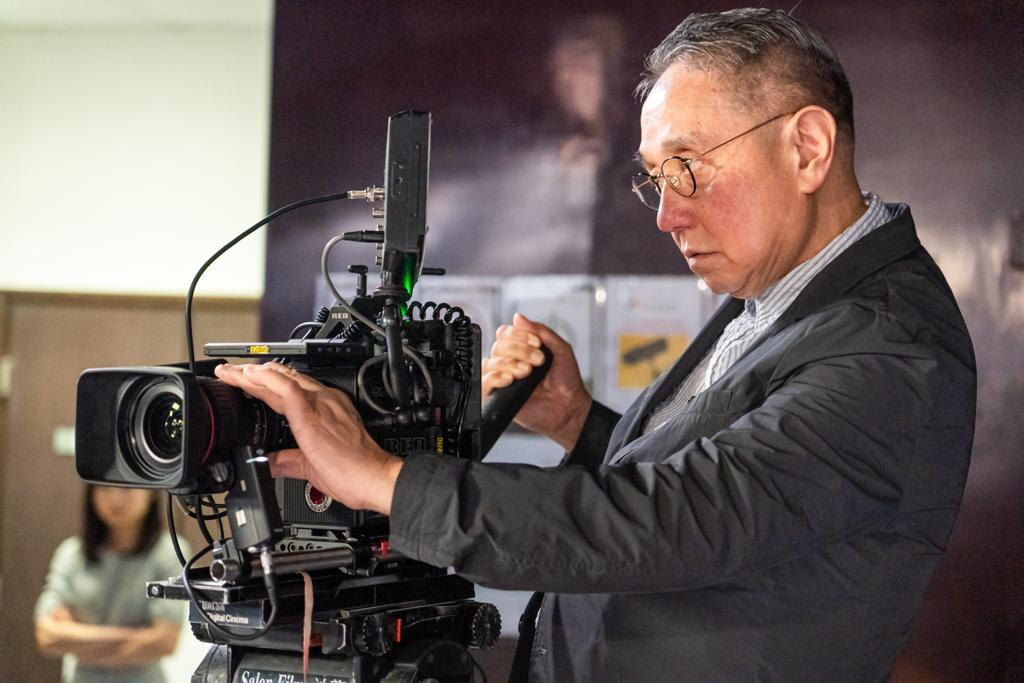
- Hang in 2021
- Born: British Hong Kong
- Education: Hong Kong Baptist University
- Occupation: Cinematographer
- Years active: 1984–present
- Organization(s): Hong Kong society of Cinematographer (HKSC); The Canadian Society of Cinematographers (CSC)
- Board member of: Oscar Board of Judge The Academy of Motion Picture Arts and Sciences
- Awards: Hong Kong Film Award for Best Cinematography; 1985 The Island; 1992 Center Stage; Golden Horse Award; 1990 Red Dust; 1991 Center Stage (1991 film)

Hang-Sang Poon is a Hong Kong-Canadian cinematographer, film director, producer and actor. Poon is best known for his cinematography in collaboration with directors such as Yim Ho, Ronny Yu, Stephen Chow, Stephen Fung, John Woo, Fruit Chan, Po-Chih Leong, Johnnie To, Tsiu Hark, as well as his contribution to the Hong Kong film industry since the 1980s.

Poon is the two-time recipient of the Hong Kong Film Award for Best Cinematography for the films The Island (1985) and Center Stage (1991). Poon has been selected by The Academy of Motion Picture Arts and Sciences as Hong Kong representative for Oscar’s board of judges in 2016. He has also had nine nominations for the Hong Kong Film Award for Best Cinematography, including Homecoming (1984), Peking Opera Blues (1986), A Chinese Ghost Story (1987), Shanghai Grand (1996), and Kung Fu Hustle (2004). In 1990 and 1991, the films Red Dust and Center Stage won him the Best Cinematography Award in the 27th and 28th Golden Horse Award respectively. The film Who Am I? (1998) featuring Jackie Chan has earned him a nomination of the same Award in the 35th Golden Horse Award.

Poon is an alumnus of the Academy of Film of the School of Communication, Hong Kong Baptist University. He is currently a lecturer at the Hong Kong Baptist University teaching cinematography and lighting.

== Early life ==
Poon studied at the Communication Department of the Hong Kong Baptist College, majoring in film studies. After his graduation in 1976, he joined Radio & Television Hong Kong as a cameraman, where he gained early experiences in cinematography and lighting practices.

== Cinematography ==
| Year | Title | Director | Notes |
|---|---|---|---|
| 1984 | Homecoming | Yim Ho | Nomination: Hong Kong Film Award for Best Cinematography |
| 1984 | Ngoh Wai Nei Kong | Ping-hing Kam | Nomination: Hong Kong Film Award for Best New Performer |
| 1985 | Bu huo ying xiong | Po-Chih Leong | |
| 1985 | The Island | Po-Chih Leong | Hong Kong Film Award for Best Cinematography |
| 1986 | My Family | Sai Hung Fung | |
| 1986 | Ha lin hang dong | Hung-Chuen Lau | |
| 1986 | Peking Opera Blues | Tsui Hark | |
| 1986 | Inspector Chocolate | Philip Chan | |
| 1987 | A Chinese Ghost Story | Ching-siu tong | |
| 1987 | Wonder Women | Kwok-Leung Gan | |
| 1988 | Fatal Love | Po-Chih Leong | |
| 1988 | The Story of Hay Bo | Yan Yee Lee | Nomination: Hong Kong Film Award for Best Cinematography |
| 1989 | The Iceman Cometh | Clarence Fok | |
| 1990 | Red Dust | Yim Ho | Golden Horse Award, Nomination: Hong Kong Film Award for Best Cinematography |
| 1991 | Once a Thief | John Woo | |
| 1991 | Center Stage | Stanley Kwan | Hong Kong Film Award for Best Cinematography, Golden Horse Award |
| 1992 | Now You See It, Now You Don't | Mabel Cheung, Alex Law | |
| 1993 | The Heroic Trio | Johnnie To | |
| 1993 | Crime Story | Kirk Wong, Jackie Chan | |
| 1993 | Executioners | Siu-Tung Ching, Johnnie To | |
| 1994 | Wonder Seven | Siu-Tung Ching | |
| 1994 | Feng chen san nu xia | Andy Wing-Keung Chin | |
| 1995 | A Chinese Odyssey: Part One - Pandora's Box | Jeffrey Lau | |
| 1995 | Only Fools Fall in Love | Vincent Kok | |
| 1996 | A Moment of Romance III | Johnnie To | |
| 1996 | Shanghai Grand | Man Kit Poon | Nomination: Golden Bauhinia Awards for Best Cinematography Nomination: Hong Kong Film Award for Best Cinematography |
| 1997 | Kitchen | Yim Ho | |
| 1998 | Who Am I? | Benny Chan | Nomination: Golden Horse Award |
| 1998 | The Poet | Yim Ho | |
| 2001 | Pavilion of Women | Yim Ho | |
| 2001 | Qing mi da hua wang | Jing Wong | |
| 2001 | Zu Warriors | Tsui Hark | |
| 2001 | The 51st State | Ronny Yu | |
| 2001 | 2002 | Wilson Yip, William Darvill | |
| 2002 | Marry a Rich Man | Vincent Kok | |
| 2002 | Dry Wood Fierce Fire | Wilson Yip | |
| 2002 | Twenty Something Taipei | Leon Dai | |
| 2004 | A West Lake Moment | Zi Yang, Yim Ho | |
| 2004 | Enter the Phoenix | Stephen Fung | |
| 2004 | Kung Fu Hustle | Stephen Chow | Nomination: Golden Bauhinia Awards for Best Cinematography Nomination: Hong Kong Film Award for Best Cinematography Nomination: Satellite Awards for Best Cinematography |
| 2005 | House of Fury | Stephen Fung | |
| 2006 | Fearless | Ronny Yu | |
| 2008 | CJ7 | Stephen Chow | |
| 2009 | Blood: The Last Vampire | Chris Nahon | |
| 2009 | Don't Look Up | Fruit Chan | |
| 2010 | Crossing Hennessy | Ivy Ho | |
| 2010 | Ip Man 2 | Wilson Yip | Nomination: Hong Kong Film Award for Best Cinematography |
| 2010 | Flirting Scholar 2 | Lik-Chi Lee | |
| 2011 | The Purple House | Hang-Sang Poon | |
| 2019 | Push and Shove | Nan Wu | |

== Producer ==
| Year | Title |
|---|---|
| 2011 | The Purple House (executive producer) |
| 2012 | Amalgamations (short) (executive producer) |
| 2013 | My Boy Boy Boy Boyfriend |
| 2015 | Grandpa Online (short) |
| 2013 | Masquerade (short) |
| 2017 | Private Shushan Gakuen (television series) |
| 2018 | The Hongkongers (short) |

== Director ==
| Year | Title | Main Cast |
|---|---|---|
| 2013 | Freddy vs. Jason (second unit director) | Robert Englund, Ken Kirzinger |
| 2011 | The Purple House | Jiro Wang, Tong Liya |
| 2014 | More Than Healing | Frankie Lam |
| 2016 | Red Lips | |
| 2018 | Green Dust (short) | Alexa Higasi, Leanne Ho, Yiu-Sing Lam |

== Artistic directory ==
| Year | Title |
|---|---|
| 2017 | The Glory of Tang Dynasty (television series) |
| 2019 | Push and Shove |

== Acting ==
| Year | Title | Role |
|---|---|---|
| 1992 | Now You See It, Now You Don't | No Teeth |
| 1995 | Happy Hour | |
| 1995 | Heaven Can't Wait | |
| 1996 | Forbidden City Cop | Fat's Father-in-law |
| 2001 | The Accidental Spy | Rich Man |
| 2001 | Pavilion of Women | Fat Cook |
| 2002 | Demi-Haunted | |
| 2006 | Duk haan yum cha | Disco Fat Guy (as Hang Sang Poon) |
| 2008 | CJ7 | Reporter (as Hang Sang Poon) |
| 2010 | La comédie humaine | |
| 2019 | A Lifetime Treasure | Doctor |
| 2023 | Over My Dead Body | Sue's father |
