= Yan Luo =

Yan Luo may refer to:

- In Chinese mythology Yan Luo is the ruler of hell, see Yama (East Asia)
- Luo Yan (screenwriter), Chinese born screenwriter, producer, and actress
