= Yuanyang Hudie =

Yuanyang Hudie may refer to:

- Mandarin Ducks and Butterflies, a school of Chinese literature in the early 20th century
- A West Lake Moment, a 2005 Chinese film
