= King of Chess (1991 film) =

1991 Hong Kong film by Yim Ho

- Theatrical release poster
- Traditional Chinese: 棋王
- Hanyu Pinyin: Qi wang
- Directed by: Yim Ho; Tsui Hark (uncredited)
- Screenplay by: Yim Ho; Tony Leung Ka-fai
- Based on: King of Chess by Ah Cheng; King of Chess by Cheung Hay Kwok
- Produced by: Tsui Hark
- Starring: Tony Leung Ka-fai; John Sham; Yim Ho
- Cinematography: Li Yi-hsu
- Edited by: Marco Mak
- Music by: Lo Ta-Yu
- Production company: Golden Princess Film Production
- Distributed by: Golden Princess Amusement Co., Ltd.
- Release dates: 6 September 1991; (Toronto International Film Festival); 21 February 1992 (Berlin International Film Festival); 25 February 1992 (Hong Kong)
- Running time: 103 minutes
- Country: Hong Kong
- Language: Cantonese
- Box office: HK$1,151,165

King of Chess (Chinese: 棋王; pinyin: Qi wang) is a 1991 Hong Kong drama film directed by Yim Ho. Following disputes with the film's producer Tsui Hark, Yim Ho left the project and Tsui Hark completed the film, though Yim Ho remains credited as the sole director.

== Plot ==
In modern-day Taipei, TV hostess Jade Mui's contract is coming to an end and her boss is seeking to replace her with a younger girl. Mr. Ching, an influential man from Hong Kong, pull strings to help her as she attempts to make the final episodes of her TV series Whiz Kids World impressive in order to have a better chance of being hired by another company. He suggests featuring a young chess prodigy known as the "Chess King" who has never lost a game, because the child reminds him of a "Chess King" he encountered back in China in 1967 during the Cultural Revolution. The film intersperses scenes of modern-day Taiwan with scenes of Mr. Ching's memories from the Cultural revolution.

== Cast ==
- Tony Leung Ka-fai Wong Yat Sun
- John Sham as Ching Ling
- Yim Ho as Chung
- Yang Lin as Jade Mui
- Wong Sing-fong as Little Chess King
- Chin Shih-chieh as Lanky Ngai
- John Chan Koon-chung as Prof. Lau Yue Bok
- Shu Huai-fei
- Lui Ming as Vice Chairman Lam
- Ku Chun as Old Chess Master
- Chang Pao-shang
- Danny Deng
- Suen Hiu-wai
- Sam Shui-kwan as Chess Master
- Bianna Chan
- O Sing-pui
- Chang Hwa-kun
- Chu Feng-kang as Show Director
- Li Tian-lu as Little Chess King's Grandfather
- Chang Chia-tai
- Yau Jun-lung
- Kao Kuo-Kuang
- Hung Sin-kwan

== Production ==
The film is adapted from two different novels called King of Chess, one by Ah Cheng and one by Cheung Hay Kwok.

Taiwanese film director Chang Tso-chi worked as director's assistant on King of Chess.

Several reviewers noted a distinct difference in filmmaking styles during different parts of the film and presumed the film to be the work of more than one director.

In his book Planet Hong Kong: Popular Cinema and the Art of Entertainment, author David Bordwell wrote that Tsui Hark "took over Yim Ho's King of Chess".

Jonathan Rosenbaum wrote, "Yim Ho — the gifted director of Homecoming (1984), which I reviewed favorably when it showed at Facets Multimedia in late 1987 — started shooting King of Chess in Taipei around that time, from a script that he wrote with Tony Leung, one of his lead actors. But the following year Yim either quit the film or was fired, apparently due to its escalating budget. Tsui Hark, the producer, eventually took over as director, recasting the female lead, and the film was finally released four years after it began shooting, in a version disowned by Yim (though the film credits list him as the only director). [...] It appears that the mainland sections were all directed by Yim and the Taipei sections were all — or mainly — directed by Tsui, who was also in charge of the final editing; but perhaps because the film’s structure is predicated on strong contrasts, the two stories wind up supporting one another."

The book Fifty Contemporary Filmmakers, edited by Yvonne Tasker, lists Tsui Hark as the co-director of the film.

== Release ==
The film premiered at the Toronto International Film Festival on September 6, 1991. This was followed by a showing at the Berlin International Film Festival on 21 February 1992.

The film had a theatrical run in Hong Kong from 25 September to 21 October 1992, earning HK$1,151,165.

== Reception ==
In his book Hong Kong New Wave Cinema (1978–2000), author Pak Tong Cheuk wrote, "Although the King of Chess (1991) is a co-production of Yim Ho and Tsui Hark, it would appear from viewing the film that the first half, on the Cultural Revolution in mainland China, was directed by Yim; while the second half, displaying cross-cut scenes of Taipei and the mainland, was the work of Tsui."

Reviewer Jonathan Rosenbaum of Chicago Reader wrote, "Though writer-director Yim Ho (Homecoming) disowned this film after producer Tsui Hark took over the direction, it is still one of the most interesting and original Hong Kong pictures I've seen. [...] The powerful and talented Yim directed the mainland sections with a highly emotional lyricism that reminds me at times of Bertolucci; the slicker and more action-oriented Tsui handled the brittle Taipei sections. The results may not be what Yim wanted, but it’s still a singular and fascinating work, with a great deal of intelligence and feeling."

The review on the14amazons.co.uk reads, "The movie flits back and forth from Taiwan in 'the present day' to China during/after the cultural revolution. [...] "The movie isn't really saying either time or social system was/is better than the other, or suggest ways to improve the world - it just points out the problems with people in general." The review concludes, "Overall it is a visually nice movie, with a bunch of interesting scenes and some much less interesting scenes. The end result seems a little unfocussed, like they weren't quite sure what their point was."

Regarding the imagery, Jeannette Delamoir wrote, "The King of Chess (1990; Hong Kong; Yim Ho and Tsui Hark) reuses newsreel footage of Red Guard rallies – set to rock music – in its comparative exploration of visuality in modern Taiwan, and in China during the Cultural Revolution. Cultural artefacts such as the Beijing Opera were co-opted to visually (as well as in other ways) represent the regime; even people's clothes became part of a collective visual experience that reinforced the interpenetration of the political and the personal."

The review website hkfilm.net gave the film a rating of 3 out of 10, calling it, "a boring and mundane morality tale that fails to get its' [sic] point across, even while delivering it with all the subtlety of a Triple H sledgehammer strike to the nether regions."

In the 1997 work Hong Kong Cinema: The Extra Dimensions, author Stephen Teo wrote, "Perhaps the most representative film of Yim's, which treats modern Chinese history as a soulsearching endeavour, is King of Chess/Qi Wang (1992). The film is set in both China and Taiwan, criss-crossing between the two countries in separate time periods: China during the Cultural Revolution and Taiwan in the contemporary 80s. The story deals with a 'chess king' who is sent to a labour camp during the Cultural Revolution and zig-zags to scenes in Taiwan concerning a chess prodigy who is introduced as the latest sensation in a television ratings war. The two stories reflect on the vicissitudes of political history and their effects on the individual. Yim began directing the film in 1988 with Tsui Hark as producer, but the project was shelved before it was given the Tsui Hark 'treatment' and finally released in 1992. As a project assigned to Yim Ho, it is clear that Tsui more than tampered with the film. However, the film brings both Yim and Tsui in line with their nationalistic concern for China, evident in the motifs of both directors' films."
