= Lotus Code =

- 谍·莲花
- Directed by: Frank Zhu
- Production companies: China Movie Channel SARFT; Beijing Shiji Zhizhu Media Co., Ltd; Beijing Wishart Communication Co., Ltd
- Distributed by: Le Vision Pictures (Beijing) Co., Ltd
- Release date: January 16, 2015
- Running time: 90 minutes
- Country: China
- Language: Mandarin
- Box office: ¥4.45 million

Lotus Code (Chinese: 谍·莲花) is a 2015 Chinese suspense drama film directed by Frank Zhu. It was released on January 16, 2015.

== Cast ==
- Lu Nuo
- Pan Yang
- Gao Liwen
- Chen Peisi
- Zhu Shimao
- Chen Yuemo
- Ying Batu
- Hou Di
- Li Dahai
- Frank Zhu

== Reception ==
By January 16, the film had earned ¥4.45 million.
