= Dragon Force (film) =

1982 Hong Kong film by Michael Mak

- Film poster
- Directed by: Michael Mak
- Written by: Terry Chalmers; Dennis Thompsett
- Produced by: Jai-Wen Ma
- Starring: Bruce Baron; Mandy Moore; James Barnett; Frances Fong; Olivia Jeng; Randy Channell; Richard Lau; Hal Archer; Sam Sorono; Bruce Li
- Cinematography: Robert Huke
- Edited by: Yiu Chung Yeung
- Music by: Chris Babida
- Distributed by: Theatrical; Bedford Entertainment USA (1983); Golden Harvest Cinema Canada (1983); Apollo-Film GmbH West Germany (1984); Avis-Filmverleih West Germany (1984)
- Release date: 16 December 1982
- Country: Hong Kong
- Language: English

Dragon Force is a 1982 Hong Kong martial arts film directed by Michael Mak. It starred Bruce Baron, Frances Fong, Chi-Hung Chan, Sam Sorono, Yun Ho, Jackson Ng and Bruce Li.

== Story ==
A princess is kidnapped by a general. An agent teams up with an international crime fighting organization called Dragon Force to rescue her.

== Background ==
Mak's efforts paid off. They used script-writers with Western names as well as some cast members. The film was shown in 52 countries and made a good profit in the millions. The film was also shot originally in English. It is also called Power Force and Shen Tan Guang Tou Mei.

The story was written by Terry Chalmers, Dennis Thompsett and John Au Wa Hon.
