= Long Arm of the Law Part 3 =

1989 Hong Kong film by Michael Mak

- US film poster.
- Traditional Chinese: 省港旗兵第三集
- Simplified Chinese: 省港旗兵第三集
- Hanyu Pinyin: Shěng Gǎng Qí Bīng Dì Sān Jí
- Jyutping: Saang2 Gong2 Kei4 Bing1 Dai6 Saam1 Zaap6
- Directed by: Michael Mak
- Written by: Johnny Mak; Stephen Shiu
- Produced by: Stephen Shiu
- Starring: Andy Lau; Elizabeth Lee; Max Mok; Elvis Tsui
- Cinematography: Derek Wan
- Edited by: Poon Hung
- Music by: Joseph Chan
- Production company: Johnny Mak Production
- Distributed by: Movie Impact
- Release date: 12 January 1989
- Running time: 107 minutes
- Country: Hong Kong
- Language: Cantonese
- Box office: HK$12,200,661

Long Arm of the Law Part 3 is a 1989 Hong Kong action film directed by Michael Mak and starring Andy Lau, Elizabeth Lee, Max Mok and Elvis Tsui. The core theme of the film is the attack of Mainland China and its unjust and brutal law and tells the story of an honorary soldier from China (Lau) who was falsely accused of robbery and illegally flees to Hong Kong, where he ends up working for the triads in order to save his lover (Lee) from being sold as a prostitute. The film is the third entry of the Long Arm of the Law series of films with unconnected storylines.

== Plot ==
Honorary soldier Lee Cheung-kong was falsely accused for robbery committed by his friends in China and was arrested by Officer Mo Heung-yeung. Cheung-kong's appeal was rejected and sentenced to death, but he successfully escapes his execution but was stabbed by Mo while running. He illegally escapes to Hong Kong and meets two illegal immigrants, Seung Moon and Chicken Heart, developing feelings with the former when she treated his wound and getting intimate hiding in a truck being searched by officers. After arriving in Hong Kong, Moon was sold as a prostitute to repay debts, while Chicken Heart and his younger brother were taken in by triad boss Master Leung as labor. Cheung-kong owes Snakehead, the shipper of the illegal immigrants, HK$3000, when his uncle refuses to acknowledge him. Leung notices Cheung-kong's combat skills when the latter fights Snakehead, and his henchmen and offers to pay for his debt and a job at his construction site.

Cheung-kong finds out from Leung about Moon being a prostitute and begs him for help. Leung suggests Cheung-kong to join a jewel robber gang led by Master Cheuk and reveals to Cheung-kong the brothel where Moon is forced to work, but Leung informs the brothel boss to anticipate Cheung-kong's arrival. Armed with a machete, Cheung-kong rescue Moon and fights off the brothel boss and his henchmen but Moon gets taken away in a car. Leung convinces Cheuk of Cheung-kong's fighting skills so Cheuk arranges him to partner with Chicken Heart, whose brother was killed while taking a bullet for him. At this time, Mo was sent to Hong Kong to hunt for Cheung-kong. The Hong Kong police initially prevents Mo from interfering with Hong Kong's legal system, but reluctantly assigns Inspector Cat to work with him.

Cheuk leads Cheung-kong, Chicken Heart, and his gang to rob a jewelry shop where Cheung-kong shoots an off duty police superintendent and Chicken Heart gets stuck inside a safe with a manager. Cheung-kong breaks Chicken Heart out with a grenade and flee from the police and the gang pick them up. Afterwards, Cheuk refuses to release Moon, blaming Cheung-kong for shooting a police superintendent and having to find a new hideout for him. Cheuk also refuses to pay Chicken Heart, who has not received pay for three previous robberies. Leung's underling, 966, lead Cheung-kong and Chicken Heart to their new hideout in a boat where Cheung-kong reunites with Moon.

Cheung-kong discovers Mo's arrival to Hong Kong to hunt for him and wants to leave, angering Cheuk, who instructs his henchmen to capture Moon in a speed boat so Cheung-kong agrees to work for an entire year for Cheuk, who allows him to reunite with Moon. Later, Leung gets taken by Mo to the police station and beaten and blackmailed by Mo to reveal the whereabouts of Cheung-kong, so he and Cheuk sways Cheung-kong to kill Mo and gives him a pistol while having lured Mo to the nightclub that they are in. Cheung-kong fires at Mo, erupting gunfight a between the two which leads to a scuffle until Cheung-kong subdues Mo, but ultimately lets Mo go. Enraged, Cheuk threatens to sell Moon and Cheung-kong fights Cheuk, so Leung allows Cheung-kong talk with Moon on the phone in order to continue to exploit him. Meanwhile, both Leung and Cheuk rape Moon while having her captured.

While robbing an armoured truck at their next heist, an intense gunfight with security guards ensues where Cheuk escapes while Cheung-kong and Chicken Heart realize they were given blank guns by Leung and Cheuk, so they force 966 to bring them to an apartment where Moon is hidden, where Cheung-kong blasts Leung with a submachine gun and kicks Cheuk out the window off the balcony before escaping with Moon when the police arrive. Chicken Heart dies on their way to the dock, where Cheung-kong and Moon sail off before returning to land when Moon is suffering from gunshot injuries. Heung-yeung arrives to stop Cheung-kong, but eventually let the couple go to a doctor to treat Moon's wound, and Mo visits them where Kong tells Mo that when China's legislation improves, he will return. Finally, Cheung-kong reaches Panama with Moon start a new life.

== Cast ==
- Andy Lau as Lee Cheung-kong (李長江), the film's protagonist, an honorary soldier from China who escapes to Hong Kong after being falsely accused for robbery. An upright man and skilled combatant, he is exploited by triad bosses Cheuk and Leung to commit robberies to save his lover, Moon, from being sold as a prostitute.
- Elizabeth Lee as Seung Moon (常滿), a young woman who was sold by her father to be a prostitute in Hong Kong but falls in love with Cheung-kong.
- Max Mok as Chicken Heart (雞心), an ambitious but good-natured young man who dreams of making big money in Hong Kong and works for Cheuk and Leung, who takes advantage of him.
- Elvis Tsui as Mo Heung-yeung (毛向陽), a Mainland Chinese police officer who goes strictly by the book and very stubborn but would also resort to police brutality.
- Stephen Chan as Master Cheuk (沙皮卓), a hot-headed robber and leader of the Hunan Gang.
- Kirk Wong as Master Leung (良哥), a slimy triad leader and Cheuk's partner.
- Ken Boyle as a senior police officer of the Royal Police Force.
- Kan Sek-ming as Inspector Cat (貓Sir), a Hong Kong police officer assigned to keep an eye on Mo.
- Robin Shou as 966, Leung and Cheuk's underling.
- Fung Yuen-chi as Snakehead (廣西仔), head of the illegal immigrant ring.
- Dion Lam as a security guard for the armoured truck.

== Box office ==
The film grossed HK$12,200,661 at the Hong Kong box office its theatrical run from 12 January to 1 February 1989 in Hong Kong.

== See also ==
- Andy Lau filmography
