= Hong Kong 1941 =

1984 Hong Kong film by Po-Chih Leong

- DVD cover

Chinese name
- Traditional Chinese: 等待黎明
- Simplified Chinese: 等待黎明
Transcriptions
Standard Mandarin
- Hanyu Pinyin: Děng Dài Lí Míng
Yue: Cantonese
- Jyutping: Dang2 Doi6 Lai4 Ming4
- Directed by: Po-Chih Leong
- Written by: John Chan; Sammo Hung
- Produced by: John Shum
- Starring: Chow Yun-fat; Cecilia Yip; Alex Man
- Cinematography: Brian Lai
- Edited by: Peter Cheung
- Music by: Violet Lam
- Production companies: D&B Films; Bo Ho Films
- Distributed by: Golden Harvest
- Release date: 1 November 1984
- Running time: 100 minutes
- Country: Hong Kong
- Language: Cantonese
- Box office: HK$7.22 million.

Hong Kong 1941 (Chinese: 等待黎明) is a 1984 Hong Kong war drama film directed by Po-Chih Leong, produced by John Shum and written by Sammo Hung. The film stars Chow Yun-fat, Cecilia Yip and Alex Man. For his performance in this film, Chow was awarded his first Golden Horse Award for Best Leading Actor.

== Synopsis ==
The film takes places shortly before and during the Japanese occupation of Hong Kong during World War II. The story of three young friends focuses on their sufferings as Hong Kong falls under oppressive occupation.

Years later, a woman narrates her personal story of the Japanese takeover of Hong Kong in 1941. She's Nam, young, attractive, daughter of a wealthy rice merchant, and prey to painful, disabling seizures. Her boyhood friend is Coolie Keung, whose family used to have wealth; he's now impoverished, a tough kid, a leader, in love with her. Into the mix steps Fei, cool and resourceful, an actor from the north, intent on getting to San Francisco in the US or Australia. They form a trio, but the day they are to leave Hong Kong, the invasion stops them. Fei must rescue Keung from collaborators, Nam falls in love with Fei, and danger awaits their next attempt to escape.

== Filming locations ==
Yu Yuen (娛苑), a large residential building built in 1927 in Tung Tau Wai, Wang Chau, is featured in the film.

== Cast and roles ==
- Chow Yun-fat as Yip Kim-fei
- Cecilia Yip as Han Yuk-nam
- Alex Man as Wong Hak-keung
- Shih Kien as Ha Chung-sun, Nam's father
- Wu Ma as Chairman Liu Yan-mau
- Paul Chun as Fa Wing
- Ku Feng as Shui / Shiu
- Stuart Ong as General Kanezawa
- Billy Lau as Factory Foreman
- Angela Yu Chien as Fei's Aunt
- Chu Tau as Liu's men
- Chow Kam-kong Liu's man
- Po-Chih Leong as Emperor
- Chin Ka-lok (extra)
- Pang Yun-cheung (extra)
- Lee Chi-kit (extra)

== Home media ==
On 16 June 2025, Eureka Entertainment, an independent film distributor, will release a new 4K restoration of Hong Kong 1941 on Blu-ray as part of its "Masters of Cinema" series.

== Awards and nominations ==
Awards
Ceremony	Category	Name	Outcome
22nd Golden Horse Awards
22nd Golden Horse Awards	Best Actor	Chow Yun-fat	Won
22nd Golden Horse Awards	Best Actor	Alex Man	Nominated
4th Hong Kong Film Awards
4th Hong Kong Film Awards	Best Film	Hong Kong 1941	Nominated
4th Hong Kong Film Awards	Best Director	Po-Chih Leong	Nominated
4th Hong Kong Film Awards	Best Screenplay	John Chan	Nominated
4th Hong Kong Film Awards	Best Actor	Chow Yun-fat	Nominated
4th Hong Kong Film Awards	Best Actress	Cecilia Yip	Nominated
4th Hong Kong Film Awards	Best Supporting Actress	Angela Yu Chien	Nominated
4th Hong Kong Film Awards	Best Cinematography	Brian Lai	Won
4th Hong Kong Film Awards	Best Film Editing	Peter Cheung	Nominated
