= Everlasting Love (film) =

1984 Hong Kong film by Michael Mak

- Film poster
- Traditional Chinese: 停不了的愛
- Simplified Chinese: 停不了的爱
- Hanyu Pinyin: Tíng Bù Liǎo De Ài
- Jyutping: Ting4 Bat1 Liu2 Dik1 Ngoi3
- Directed by: Michael Mak
- Screenplay by: Manfred Wong
- Produced by: Johnny Mak
- Starring: Andy Lau; Irene Wan; Loletta Lee; Ng Man-tat
- Cinematography: Gray Hoh
- Edited by: Fan Kung Ming
- Music by: Lam Miu Tak
- Production company: Johnny Mak Production
- Distributed by: Golden Harvest
- Release date: 22 March 1984
- Running time: 98 minutes
- Country: Hong Kong
- Language: Cantonese
- Box office: HK$10,435,613

Everlasting Love (Chinese: 停不了的愛) is a 1984 Hong Kong romance drama film directed by Michael Mak and starring Andy Lau and Irene Wan.

== Cast ==
- Andy Lau as Eric
- Irene Wan as Pauline Leung Pui Kwun
- Loletta Lee as Lulu Leung
- Ng Man-tat as Bob

== Reception ==
The film performed well in Hong Kong, grossing HK$10,435,613 during its theatrical run from 22 March to 11 April 1984.

=== Awards ===
4th Hong Kong Film Awards

- Nominated: Best Screenplay – Manfred Wong
