= Full Moon in New York =

1989 American-Hong Kong film by Stanley Kwan

- Film poster

Chinese name
- Traditional Chinese: 人在紐約
- Simplified Chinese: 人在纽约
Transcriptions
Standard Mandarin
- Hanyu Pinyin: Rén zài niǔyuē
Yue: Cantonese
- Jyutping: jan4 hai2 nau2joek3
- Directed by: Stanley Kwan
- Written by: Ah Cheng; Yau Kong-kin
- Produced by: Henry Fong Ping
- Starring: Sylvia Chang; Maggie Cheung; Siqin Gaowa
- Cinematography: Bill Wong
- Edited by: Chow Cheung-kan
- Music by: Chang Hung-yi
- Release dates: 18 November 1989 (Taiwan); 1 March 1990 (Hong Kong)
- Running time: 89 minutes
- Countries: United States; Hong Kong
- Languages: English; Mandarin; Cantonese
- Box office: HK$3,957,122

Full Moon in New York (Chinese: 人在紐約, Ren zai Niu Yue) is a 1989 drama film directed by Stanley Kwan and produced by Henry Fong. It stars Sylvia Chang, Maggie Cheung, and Siqin Gaowa as three women from Taiwan, Hong Kong, and mainland China striving to build new lives in New York City while navigating cultural clashes, personal struggles, and unexpected friendships.

== Plot ==
In the late autumn of 1988, Zhao Hong moves from mainland China to the United States and marries Thomas, a Chinese American. New to a foreign land, she struggles with English and is unfamiliar with the American way of life, but she yearns to build a new future. She hopes to bring her mother to live with her in the United States, but fails to gain Thomas' understanding. Wang Hsiung-ping, who moved from Taiwan to the United States over a decade ago, is passionate about theater. Despite facing discrimination, she is determined to break into the American stage scene.

Lee Fung-jiau, an immigrant from Hong Kong, runs a restaurant with her father in New York. She is well-versed in stocks and real estate, yet still feels lonely in America. The three women meet at a wedding and quickly become close friends. On one hand, they believe in standing united against outsiders, but when together, they often clash with each other. One evening, they gather on a rooftop drinking to release their inner pain, forming a bond that is deeply interdependent yet riddled with contradictions.

== Cast ==
- Sylvia Chang as Wang Hsiung-ping
- Maggie Cheung as Lee Fung-jiau
- Siqin Gaowa as Zhao Hong
- I-Chen Ko as the actor
- Josephine Koo as Stella
- John Reidy as the shoe man
- Luke Valerio as David
- Linda Wang as the high school student
- Vincent J. Mazella as the bartender
- Charlie Sara as John
