= Anxious to Return =

1981 film

- Directed by: Jun Li
- Written by: Keyi Li
- Starring: Siqin Gaowa; Erkang Zhao; Chen Peisi
- Cinematography: Zhenzhong Chen; Guangyuan Yang
- Edited by: Luchu Xu; Xin Zou
- Music by: Mingzhe Zhen
- Release date: 1979
- Running time: 110 min.
- Country: China
- Language: Mandarin

Anxious to Return (also known as Eagerly Homebound) is a 1979 Chinese film directed by Jun Li and starring Siqin Gaowa, Chen Peisi, and Erkang Zhao. The movie is best known for the first appearance of actress Siqin Gaowa.

== Plot ==
The film is set in the 1930s, during the Sino-Japanese War, and tells about a widow and peasant woman, Yu Zhen, who finds and saves a wounded soldier, and falls in love with him. The soldier is "trying to grapple with his conflicting emotions."

Siqin Gaowa won the Ministry of Culture's Youth Creativity Award in 1979 for her portrayal in this movie.

== Cast ==
- Siqin Gaowa as Yuzhen
- Erkang Zhao as Wei Desheng
- Ma Zhigang as Uncle Qi
- Lu Yong as Dong Laoli
- Xu Yao as Chuan Zhu
- Han Zaisheng as Sun Haishan
- Zhao Baojun as a Veteran
- Li Fengqiu as Xiao Xuzi
- Chen Peisi as Police captain
- Zhao Shoukai
- Liu Zhao
