= Huazhou Subdistrict, Dengzhou =

Subdistrict of Dengzhou, Henan, China

Coordinates: 32.6886°N 112.0893°E

Huazhou Subdistrict (Chinese: 花洲街道) is a subdistrict of Dengzhou, Henan, China.
