= Liuji, Dengzhou =

Liuji 刘集镇
- Town
- Location in Henan
- Coordinates: 32°27′44″N 112°13′06″E
- Country: People's Republic of China
- Province: Henan
- Prefecture-level city: Nanyang
- County-level city: Dengzhou
- Elevation: 96 m (315 ft)
- Time zone: UTC+8 (China Standard)
- Area code: 0377

Liuji (simplified Chinese: 刘集; traditional Chinese: 劉集; pinyin: Liújí) is a town under the administration of Dengzhou City in southwestern Henan province, China, located less than 8 kilometres (5.0 mi) north of the border with Hubei and 27 km (17 mi) south-southeast of downtown Dengzhou. As of 2011, it has one residential community (社区) and 25 villages under its administration.

== See also ==
- List of township-level divisions of Henan
