= Dengzhou =

Dengzhou 邓州市
- County-level & Sub-prefectural city
- Location of the city center in Henan
- Coordinates: 32°41′17″N 112°05′13″E
- Country: People's Republic of China
- Province: Henan
- Prefecture-level city: Nanyang

Area
  - County-level & Sub-prefectural city: 2,294 km^{2} (886 sq mi)
  - Urban: 35 km^{2} (14 sq mi)

Population (2019)
  - County-level & Sub-prefectural city: 1,366,000
  - Density: 595.5/km^{2} (1,542/sq mi)
  - Urban: 300,000
  - Urban density: 8,600/km^{2} (22,000/sq mi)
- Time zone: UTC+8 (China Standard)
- Postal code: 474170
- Area code: 0377
- Website: www.dengzhou.gov.cn

Dengzhou (simplified Chinese: 邓州; traditional Chinese: 鄧州; pinyin: Dèngzhōu), formerly Deng County (邓县; 鄧縣; Dèng Xiàn), is a county-level city in Nanyang, Henan, China. It has an area of 2,294 km^{2} (886 sq mi) and a population of 1,500,000. The urban area is 35 km^{2}, and the urban population is 300,000. The city is located in the southwest of Henan province and adjacent to Henan's border with Hubei and Shaanxi provinces. It geometrically lies in the center of the triangle of Zhengzhou, Wuhan and Xi'an, equidistant from these three cities.

It is a city with a long cultural history in China. Historical figures from Dengzhou include Zhang Zhongjing (Han dynasty physician and inventor), Han Yu (Tang dynasty poet), Kou Zhun (Song dynasty chancellor), and Fan Zhongyan (Song dynasty writer). Modern figures include the writers Yao Xueyin and Zhou Daxin.

== Administrative divisions ==
As of 2012, this city is divided to 3 subdistricts, 13 towns and 11 townships.

Subdistricts

- Huazhou Subdistrict (花洲街道)
- Gucheng Subdistrict (古城街道)
- Tuanhe Subdistrict (湍河街道)

Towns

- Luozhuang (罗庄镇)
- Jitan (汲滩镇)
- Rangdong (穰东镇)
- Menglou (孟楼镇)
- Linba (林扒镇)
- Goulin (构林镇)
- Shilin (十林镇)
- Zhangcun (张村镇)
- Dusi (都司镇)
- Zhaoji (赵集镇)
- Liuji (刘集镇)
- Sangzhuang (桑庄镇)
- Pengqiao (彭桥镇)

Townships

- Zhanglou Township (张楼乡)
- Bainiu Township (白牛乡)
- Xiaji Township (夏集乡)
- Peiying Township (裴营乡)
- Wenqu Township (文渠乡)
- Gaoji Township (高集乡)
- Taoying Township (陶营乡)
- Xiaoyangying Township (小杨营乡)
- Jiaodian Township (腰店乡)
- Longyan Township (龙堰乡)
- Jiulong Township (九龙乡)

== Climate ==
Climate data for Dengzhou, elevation 120 m (390 ft), (1991–2020 normals, extremes 1981–2010)
Month	Jan	Feb	Mar	Apr	May	Jun	Jul	Aug	Sep	Oct	Nov	Dec	Year
Record high °C (°F)	21.4 (70.5)	23.1 (73.6)	28.5 (83.3)	33.5 (92.3)	39.4 (102.9)	40.6 (105.1)	40.5 (104.9)	38.1 (100.6)	39.5 (103.1)	33.7 (92.7)	29.9 (85.8)	21.5 (70.7)	40.6 (105.1)
Mean daily maximum °C (°F)	7.2 (45.0)	10.7 (51.3)	15.7 (60.3)	22.2 (72.0)	27.6 (81.7)	31.4 (88.5)	32.2 (90.0)	31.2 (88.2)	27.4 (81.3)	22.4 (72.3)	15.5 (59.9)	9.5 (49.1)	21.1 (70.0)
Daily mean °C (°F)	2.2 (36.0)	5.3 (41.5)	10.2 (50.4)	16.3 (61.3)	21.7 (71.1)	26.0 (78.8)	27.6 (81.7)	26.5 (79.7)	22.2 (72.0)	16.7 (62.1)	10.1 (50.2)	4.3 (39.7)	15.8 (60.4)
Mean daily minimum °C (°F)	−1.4 (29.5)	1.1 (34.0)	5.6 (42.1)	11.2 (52.2)	16.6 (61.9)	21.4 (70.5)	24.0 (75.2)	23.0 (73.4)	18.4 (65.1)	12.6 (54.7)	6.1 (43.0)	0.4 (32.7)	11.6 (52.9)
Record low °C (°F)	−10.4 (13.3)	−9.6 (14.7)	−5.5 (22.1)	−0.3 (31.5)	6.2 (43.2)	12.7 (54.9)	17.1 (62.8)	14.1 (57.4)	9.5 (49.1)	0.6 (33.1)	−4.1 (24.6)	−13.5 (7.7)	−13.5 (7.7)
Average precipitation mm (inches)	14.7 (0.58)	15.9 (0.63)	34.2 (1.35)	53.5 (2.11)	77.9 (3.07)	96.6 (3.80)	115.0 (4.53)	109.4 (4.31)	76.4 (3.01)	52.7 (2.07)	36.0 (1.42)	12.8 (0.50)	695.1 (27.38)
Average precipitation days (≥ 0.1 mm)	5.2	5.8	8.0	8.5	9.7	9.2	10.9	10.7	9.8	9.5	7.5	5.4	100.2
Average snowy days	5.0	3.3	1.1	0	0	0	0	0	0	0	0.9	2.6	12.9
Average relative humidity (%)	70	68	70	72	69	71	80	80	76	73	73	70	73
Mean monthly sunshine hours	108.7	114.9	147.6	174.3	181.8	170.5	177.6	177.4	142.8	141.0	125.4	123.1	1,785.1
Percentage possible sunshine	34	37	40	45	42	40	41	43	39	41	40	40	40
Source: China Meteorological Administration

== Economy ==
Dengzhou's economy is largely based on the production of agricultural products. Farmers grow crops such as wheat, cotton, maize, sesame, peanuts, yellow beans, peppers and tobacco.

The city's primary industries include cigarette-packing, food processing and sculpture.

== Transport ==
- Airplane to nearest Nanyang airport;
- Drive along the National Expressway Network (Nanyang-Xiangfan link).
- China National Highway 207
- Railway by K149, K206/K207, K205/K208, K184, 6010/6011/6014, 1512/1513, 1389/1390, 1165/1168, 1126/1127.
- Public bus transport: many

== Tourism ==
Sightseeing

Lan Xiu Ting (Pavilion with picturesque view), Pagoda of Fu Sheng, relics of ancient city wall and the recently built touring area along the Tuan River.

== Education ==
Dengzhou No.1 High School is the most popular high school of the city. Nanyang No.4 Teachers College is the only college of the city licensed to issue certified educational diplomas to students.
