= Chen Peisi =

Chinese actor

- 陈佩斯
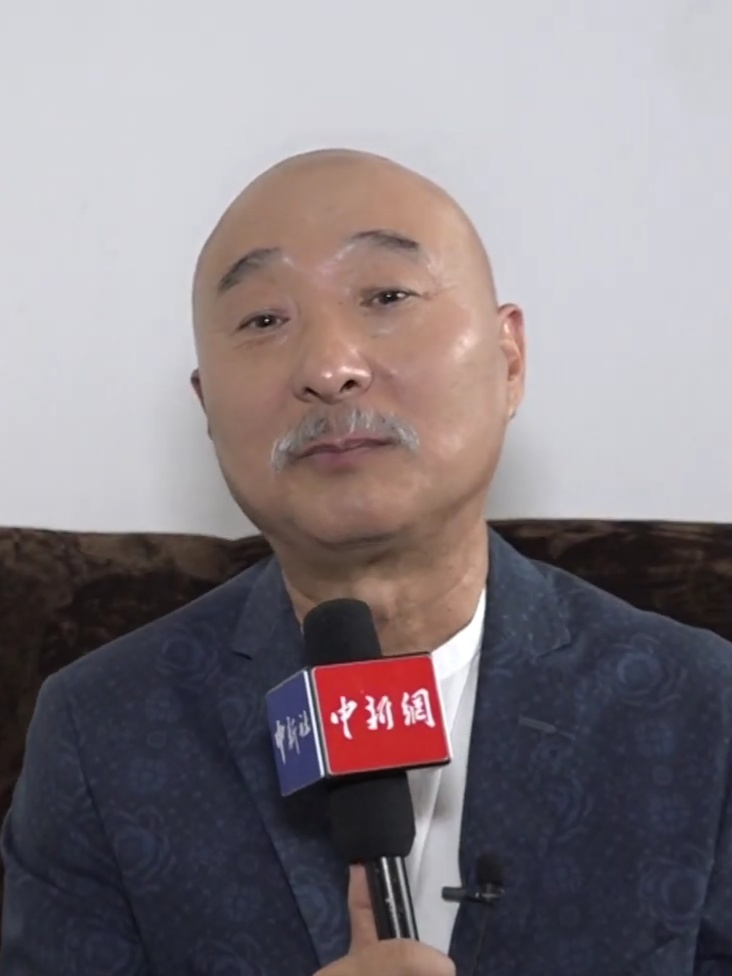
- Chen in 2020
- Born: 1 February 1954 (age 72); Changchun, Jilin, China
- Education: The High School Affiliated to Beijing Normal University
- Occupations: Comedian, sketch actor, and voice actor
- Years active: 1973–present
- Agent(s): Dadao Film and Television Limited Company
- Spouse: Wang Yanling
- Children: Chen Dayu (born 1990)
- Parent: Chen Qiang
- Awards: Hundred Flowers Award for Best Supporting Actor; 1988 Soccer Heroes

Chinese name
- Traditional Chinese: 陳佩斯
- Simplified Chinese: 陈佩斯
Transcriptions
Standard Mandarin
- Hanyu Pinyin: Chén Pèisī
Yue: Cantonese
- Jyutping: chan4 pui3 si1

Chen Peisi (Chinese: 陈佩斯; born 1 February 1954) is a Chinese sketch comedian, film and stage actor, and voice actor. Chen's oft-time comedy partner is Zhu Shimao.

== Name ==
Chen Peisi is the second son of famous stage and film actor Chen Qiang. Qiang's first son was born in 1951 while he was in Budapest performing The White-Haired Girl. Qiang was so enamoured with the city that he named his son after Buda (Chinese: 布达, Bùdá), the western half of Budapest. When his second son was born three years later, Qiang named him after Pest (Chinese: 佩斯, Pèisī), the eastern half of Budapest. Qiang's youngest child, daughter Lida (丽达), was also named after a part of Budapest — Margaret Island in the Danube, between Buda and Pest.

== Biography ==
Chen was born in Changchun, Jilin on 1 February 1954. In 1966, Chen studied at The High School Affiliated to Beijing Normal University. In 1969, during the Cultural Revolution, he worked in Inner Mongolia Production and Construction Corps. In 1973, Chen worked in August First Film Studio as an actor. In 1991, Chen set up a company named Hainan Comedy Film and Television Limited Company (海南喜剧影视有限公司), then renamed it Dadao Film and Television Limited Company (大道影业有限公司). In 2000, Chen and his partner Zhu Shimao sued the China International Television Corporation over royalties from broadcasts which they won, but they were then taken off air by the parent company, China Central Television.

On October 26, 2020, he returned to the CCTV stage and served as the first instructor of the variety show "Gold Medal Comedy Class" after 20 years.

== Filmography ==
=== Film ===
Year	English title	Chinese title	Role	Notes
1976	Storm Over the South-China Sea	南海风云	A Vietnamese sailor	
1978		猎字九十九号		
1979	Anxious to Return	归心似箭	Police captain	
1979	What a Family	瞧这一家子	Jia Qi	
1980	N and Out of Court	法庭内外	Xia Huan	
1982	Sunset Street	夕照街	Er Zi	
1982	Pipa Soul	琵琶魂	Ah Fu	
1983	The Man Who Goes To Make Money	出门挣钱的人	Zhang Yuqiang	
1985	Father and Son	父与子	Er Zi	
1985	Er Zi Has a Little Hotel	二子开店	Er Zi	
1986	Master of Suffering	少爷的磨难	Jin Fu	
1987	Soccer Heroes	京都球侠	Zhao Huli	
1988	The Silly Manager	傻冒经理	Er Zi	
1988	Black Butterfly	游侠黑蝴蝶		
1990	Father and Son's Car	父子老爷车		
1991		爷俩开歌厅		As director
1992	Make a Bomb	赚它一千万	Niu Dawei	
1992	An Interim Father	临时爸爸	General Manager Chen	
1992	The Lost Hero	迷途英雄	Peter Chen	
1993	Sub Husband	编外丈夫	Chen Yaozong	
1993	Fitial Son And Fitial Piety	孝子贤孙伺候着	Chen Xiao'er	
1995	Her Majesty Is Fine	太后吉祥	Tang Yuanyuan	
1998	Three and A Half Man	好汉三条半		
1998	Peace All Year Round	岁岁平安		
2000	Defensiveness	防卫反击		
2011	Under The Influence	戒烟不戒酒	Landlord	
2015	Lotus Code	谍·莲花	Pu Zhao	
2017	Buddies in India	大闹天竺	Tang Zong	

=== Television ===
Year	English title	Chinese title	Role	Notes
1981	Examination Room	考场		
1983	Making Trouble out of Nothing	无事生非		
1984	Kindling	火种		
1984	Wolf's Lair	狼穴		
1985	The Story of Min	敏的故事		
1986		火火寻宝记		
1986	Side of the Road	马路边		
1986	Quartet	四重奏		
1990		夫妻奏鸣曲		
1944	When Something Amazing Happens	飞来横福	Chen Xiaofu	
1996	I'm a Countryside Man	我是乡巴佬		As director
1997	Be Blessed with Double Happiness	同喜同喜		
1998	Eight Eccentrics of Yangzhou	扬州八怪	Yue Wencheng	
2000		一手托两家	Tu Jiawu	
2002	Chinese Communist Party Member: Sister Ma	党员马大姐		
2002	Takes a Little Sunshine to Give Out Radiance	给点阳光就灿烂		
2013	Xu Beihong	徐悲鸿	Patrolman	
2014	What a Big Family	好大一个家	Tang Yipin/ Tang Jinsuo	

=== Variety show ===
Year	English title	Chinese title	Role	Notes
2020–present	Gold Medal Comedy Class	金牌喜剧班	First instructor	
