= Yim Ho =

Hong kong film director

- Born: 1952 (age 73–74)
- Awards: Hong Kong Film Awards – Best Director; 1985 Homecoming Golden Horse Awards – Best Director; 1990 Red Dust

Chinese name
- Traditional Chinese: 嚴浩
- Simplified Chinese: 严浩
Transcriptions
Standard Mandarin
- Hanyu Pinyin: Yán hào
Yue: Cantonese
- Jyutping: jim4 hou6

Yim Ho (Chinese: 嚴浩) is a Hong Kong director most active in the 1980s, and a leader of the Hong Kong New Wave.

He began his career making television programs for RTHK, then became a film director in 1980.

One of his most critically acclaimed works was Homecoming (1984). This film was different from other films of that period in that it presents certain emotions and sympathies towards the relationship between Mainland China and Hong Kong (the Sino-British Joint Declaration was signed the same year Homecoming was released). The film brings together two recognized actresses, Josephine Koo and Siqin Gaowa. Anita Mui's theme song with the same title as the film has also been a popular Cantopop song.

Ho's son Linq Yim (Chinese: 严艺之, otherwise known as 嚴羚) is an actor, musician, and director who acted in Ho's 2005 film A West Lake Moment, and composed its original soundtrack.

== Filmography ==
- The Extra (1978)
- The Happening (1980)
- Wedding Bells, Wedding Bells (1981)
- Homecoming (1984) - 10 Hong Kong Film Awards nominations
  - Hong Kong Film Awards winners: Best Film, Best Director, Best Screenplay, Best Actress, Best New Performer, Best Art Direction
  - Hong Kong Film Awards nominations: Best Cinematography, Best Film Editing, Best Original Film Song, Best Original Film Score
- Red Dust (1990) - 12 Taipei Golden Horse Film Festival and Awards nominations
  - Taipei Golden Horse Film Festival and Awards winners: Best Film, Best Director, Best Cinematography, Best Actress, Best Supporting Actress, Best Art Direction, Best Costume and Make-up, Best Original Score
  - Taipei Golden Horse Film Festival and Awards nominations: Best Screenplay, Best Editing, Best Original Song, Best Sound Design
  - Hong Kong Film Awards nominations: Best Film, Best Director, Best Screenplay, Best Supporting Actress, Best Cinematography, Best Film Editing, Best Original Film Score, Best Original Film Score
  - Singapore International Film Festival nominated: Best Asian Feature Film
- King of Chess (1991)
- No Sun City (1992)
- The Day the Sun Turned Cold (1994)
  - Tokyo International Film Festival winners: Best Film, Best Director
  - Hong Kong Film Awards nominations: Best Film, Best Director
  - Hong Kong Film Critics Society Awards winners: Film of Merit, Best Actress
- The Sun Has Ears (1996)
  - Berlin International Film Festival winners: FIPRESCI Prize, Silver Bear for Best Director
  - Berlin International Film Festival nomination: Golden Bear
  - Hundred Flowers Awards winners: Best Actress
- Kitchen (1997)
  - Puchon International Fantastic Film Festival winner: Best of Puchon
  - Berlin International Film Festival nomination: Golden Bear
  - Chicago International Film Festival nomination: Gold Hugo
  - Hong Kong Film Awards nominations: Best Original Song, Best Supporting Actor
- Pavilion of Women (2001)
- A West Lake Moment (2005)
  - Taipei Golden Horse Film Festival and Awards nominations: Best Screenplay, Best Actor
- Floating City (2012)

== Awards and nominations ==
Hong Kong Film Awards

- 1985 Best Director award for Homecoming
- 1991 Best Director nomination for Red Dust
- 1991 Best Screenplay nomination for Red Dust
- 1996 Best Director nomination for The Day the Sun Turned Cold

Taipei Golden Horse Film Festival and Awards

- 1990 Best Director award for Red Dust
- 1990 Best Film award for Red Dust
- 2004 Best Screenplay nomination for A Lake Moment

Berlin International Film Festival

- 1996 Silver Bear award for The Sun Has Ears
- 1996 FIPRESCI prize for The Sun Has Ears
- 1996 Golden Bear nomination for The Sun Has Ears
- 1997 Golden Bear nomination for Kitchen

Tokyo International Film Festival

- 1994 Best Film award for The Day the Sun Turned Cold
- 1994 Best Director award for The Day the Sun Turned Cold

Puchon International Fantastic Film Festival

- 1997 Best of Puchon for Kitchen

Chicago International Film Festival

- 1997 Gold Hugo nomination for Kitchen
