= Long Arm of the Law (film) =

1984 Hong Kong film by Johnny Mak

- Film poster

Chinese name
- Traditional Chinese: 省港旗兵
Transcriptions
Yue: Cantonese
- Jyutping: Saang Gong Kei Bing
- Directed by: Johnny Mak
- Written by: Philip Chan
- Produced by: Sammo Hung; Johnny Mak
- Cinematography: Johnny Koo Kwok Wah
- Edited by: Peter Cheung Yiu Chung
- Music by: Lam Miu Tak; Mahmood Rumajahn
- Distributed by: Golden Harvest
- Release date: 11 July 1984
- Running time: 100 minutes
- Country: Hong Kong
- Language: Cantonese

Long Arm of the Law (省港旗兵, lit. "Red Guards in Guangzhou and Hong Kong") is a 1984 Hong Kong crime film directed by Johnny Mak Tong-hung.

Five men try to enter Hong Kong surreptitiously, meeting their leader there, to rob a jewellery store. One is shot and killed by Chinese border guards. Police investigating another robbery attempt at the same store spot their car acting suspiciously while they are casing it and give chase, with the robbers only escaping by opening fire and stealing a taxi.

Before the robbery has taken place, they are employed by a local triad to kill someone. The target turns out to be a policeman and they have to carry out the robbery while hiding from the police searching for them.

There were three sequels: Long Arm of the Law II (1987), Long Arm of the Law III (1989) and Long Arm of the Law IV: Underground Express (1990). Declassified files revealed that the fourth film in the series, which has a premise based on Operation Yellowbird in the aftermath of the Tiananmen massacre, was labelled by Chinese officials as "subversive". The Hong Kong government had considered banning the movie but was concerned that a ban could "give the film an importance it did not deserve", both in Hong Kong and abroad.

== Cast ==
- Chen Jing
- Kong Lung
- Ben Lam Kwok Bun
- David Lam Wai
- Ng Hoi Tin
- Shum Wai
- Wong Kin
- Wong Yan Tat
- Yeung Min
- Tommy Wong Kwong Leung - cameo
- Charles Rhys Rowlands

== Awards ==
4th Annual Hong Kong Film Awards (1985):

- Won - Best Supporting Actor (Shum Wai)
- Won - Best Editing (Cheung Yiu-Chung)
- Nominated - Best Film
- Nominated - Best Director (Johnny Mak Tong-Hung)
- Nominated - Best Screenplay (Philip Chan Yan-Kin)
- Nominated - Best New Performer (Lin Wei)
- Nominated - Best Cinematography (Koo Kwok-Wah)
- Nominated - Best Action Choreography (Billy Chan Wui-Ngai)
- Nominated - Best Original Score (Lam Mo-Tak)

Long Arm of the Law was ranked #6 on the list of Best 100 Chinese Motion Pictures during the 24th Hong Kong Film Awards ceremony on 27 March 2005.

== See also ==
- Kowloon Walled City
