= Pavilion of Women =

2001 film by Yim Ho

- Theatrical release poster
- Directed by: Yim Ho
- Screenplay by: Luo Yan; Paul Collins
- Based on: Pavilion of Women by Pearl S. Buck
- Produced by: Luo Yan
- Starring: Willem Dafoe; Luo Yan; Sau Sek; John Cho; Yi Ding; Koh Chieng Mun
- Cinematography: Hang-Sang Poon
- Edited by: Duncan Burns; Claudia Finkle
- Music by: Conrad Pope
- Production company: Beijing Film Studio
- Distributed by: Universal Focus (United States); Beijing New Picture Distribution Company (China and Hong Kong)
- Release dates: April 20, 2001 (China); May 4, 2001 (United States)
- Running time: 126 minutes
- Countries: United States; China
- Language: English
- Budget: $5 million
- Box office: $1 million

Pavilion of Women is a 2001 Chinese-American drama film directed by Yim Ho and written by Luo Yan and Paul Collins. The film stars Willem Dafoe, Luo Yan, Sau Sek, John Cho, Yi Ding and Koh Chieng Mun. The film was released on April 20, 2001 in China and on May 4, 2001 in the United States by Universal Focus. It was Universal's first co-production with a Chinese studio.

== Plot ==
Set in China in 1938, during the waning years of the Republic of China and amid the escalating Japanese invasion, Pavilion of Women follows the personal revolution of Madame Wu (Luo Yan), a refined and intelligent woman from an upper-class family.

On her 40th birthday, Madame Wu makes a bold and unprecedented decision: she withdraws from her marital duties. She informs her husband, Mr. Wu (Sau Sek), that she will no longer fulfill the role of a traditional wife and instead introduces a concubine into the household to attend to his needs. Her decision is not merely symbolic—it is driven by years of silent resentment toward Mr. Wu’s violent and unkind behavior in their marital bed. The act stuns the family and upends the household’s strict Confucian hierarchy.

The concubine, Chiuming (Yi Ding), is a beautiful and gentle young woman. While the practice of bringing concubines into wealthy families was not unusual at the time, Madame Wu’s deliberate abdication of her traditional role is radical—particularly for a woman of her social standing.

Not long after, Madame Wu encounters Father Andre (Willem Dafoe), an American Catholic missionary and doctor who has been hired to tutor her son, Fengmo Wu (John Cho). Father Andre is compassionate, intelligent, and deeply spiritual, but also progressive. He views women as intellectual equals and is a staunch advocate for education and human dignity. Intrigued by his values and his perspective on Western thought, Madame Wu seeks him out for philosophical discussions. Over time, their conversations evolve into a profound emotional and intellectual bond. He is captivated by her quiet strength; she, by his humility, sense of justice, and belief in the soul’s freedom.

As Madame Wu grows increasingly drawn to Father Andre, Mr. Wu becomes suspicious and begins to behave recklessly, acting out with selfishness and jealousy. Meanwhile, their son, Fengmo, develops romantic feelings for Chiuming and attempts to elope with her—leading to a family scandal. Madame Wu intervenes, preventing Chiuming from fleeing. Devastated and believing that she can never escape Mr. Wu’s predatory behavior, Chiuming attempts suicide.

She is saved by Father Andre, but upon regaining consciousness and seeing Mr. Wu nearby, Chiuming breaks down in panic, screaming and sobbing uncontrollably. Witnessing this, Madame Wu comes to a painful realization: every woman deserves freedom and happiness. Together with Father Andre, she helps Chiuming escape by placing her on a departing boat with money to start a new life.

On their way back from the dock, a heavy rainstorm begins. Madame Wu injures her ankle while running, and Father Andre carries her to shelter in an abandoned house. There, while tending to her injury, he gently takes her hands and kisses her. The tension between them culminates in a moment of passion, and they make love—an act that marks a turning point in Madame Wu’s emotional awakening.

However, on their return home, Fengmo sees them walking hand-in-hand. Feeling betrayed and enraged by what he perceives as his mother’s hypocrisy, he storms out and enlists in the Chinese army.

As the war intensifies, the Japanese forces reach their city. During an air raid, Mr. Wu chooses to flee with his mother and loyal servants, urging Madame Wu to come with them. She refuses, determined to remain behind and free herself from the traditional roles that have long confined her. Seeking Father Andre in the chaos, she finds only his lifeless body. He had sacrificed himself to protect the children at his mission school during the attack.

Three years later, Madame Wu is on a new path. She dedicates her life to teaching and caring for the children who had once been under Father Andre’s care.

In the final scene, her son—now a soldier—returns home accompanied by Chiuming, who has also joined the army. The past has not been erased, but reconciliation, growth, and a new sense of purpose have begun to heal what was broken.

== Cast ==
- Willem Dafoe as Father Andre
- Luo Yan as Madame Wu Ailian
- Sau Sek as Mr. Wu
- John Cho as Fengmo Wu
- Yi Ding as Chiuming
- Koh Chieng Mun as Ying
- Anita Loo as Old Lady Wu
- Amy Hill as Madame Kang
- Kate McGregor-Stewart as Sister Shirley
- Jia Dong Liu as Mr. Lang
- Shu Chen as Head Servant
- Hang-Sang Poon as Fat Cook
- Li Wang as Kang Lin Yi
- You Jin Xu as Matchmaker
- Ding Yuan Gu as Mayor
- Pei Ying Zhao as Midwife
- Xiao Dong Mao as Liangmo
- Lan Huang as Meng

== Production ==
The movie is based on the 1946 novel Pavilion of Women: A Novel of Life in the Women's Quarters, by Nobel-prize winning novelist Pearl S. Buck.

== Reception ==
=== Critical reception ===
On the review aggregator website Rotten Tomatoes, 6% of 31 critics' reviews are positive, with an average rating of 3.1/10. The website's consensus reads: "Generating more suds than a soap opera, this adaptation of Pearl Buck's novel sinks under the weight of excess melodrama, stilted performances, and cheesy dialogue." Metacritic, which assigns a normalized rating out of 100 top reviews from mainstream critics, calculated a score of 26 out of 100 based on 14 reviews, indicating "generally unfavorable reviews".

=== Box office ===
The film officially grossed 6 million yuan ($720,000) in its first 17 days from 240 screens in 10 Chinese cities. Luo Yan, the producer and co-star, accused Forbidden City, the Beijing distributor, of reallocating the film's receipts against their own film, Purple Day. The film grossed $36,992 in the United States and Canada.
