= Zhou Daxin =

Chinese novelist

- 周大新
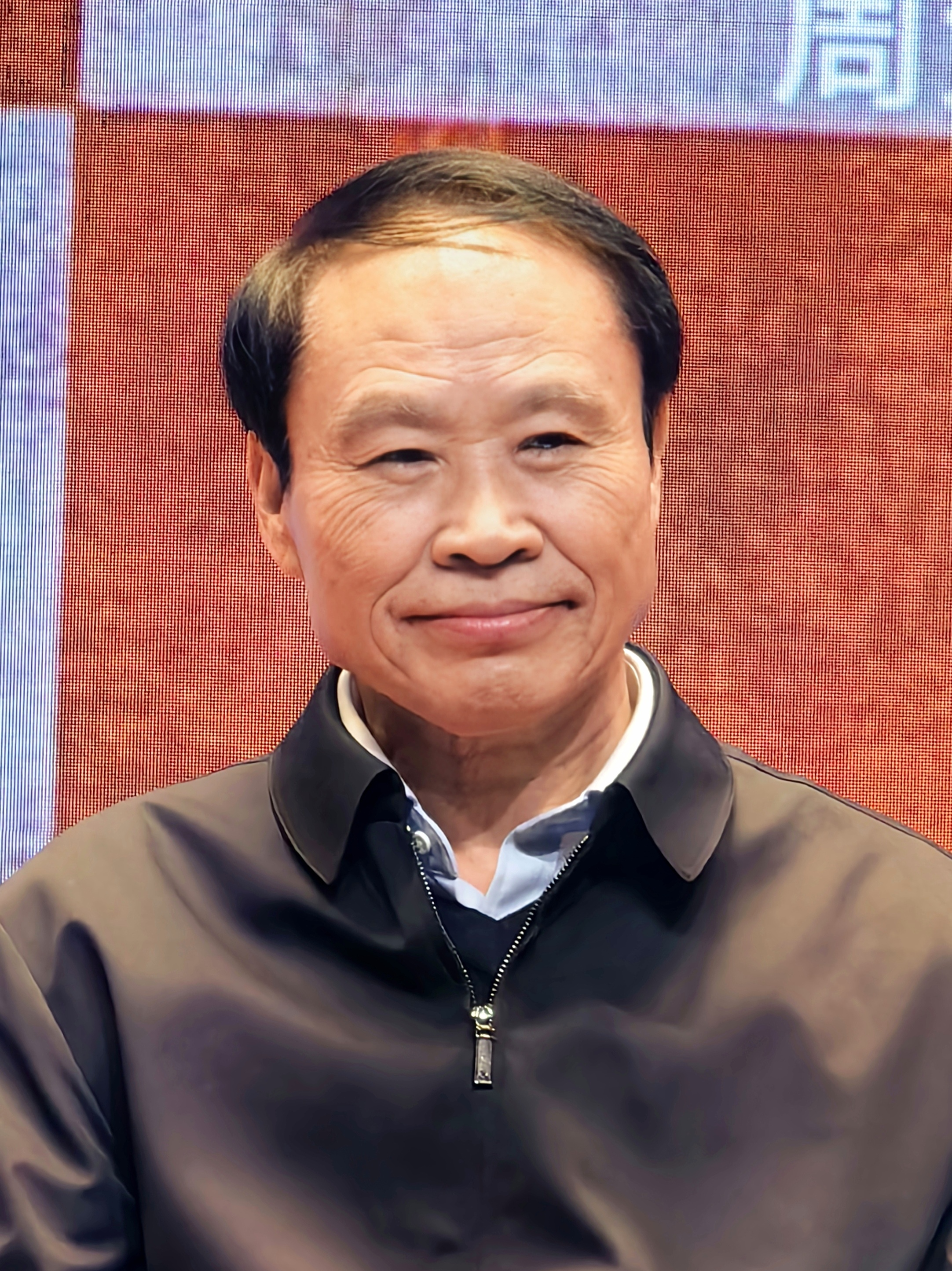
- Zhou Daxin (2025)
- Born: 1952 (age 73–74); Dengzhou, Henan, China
- Education: Xi'an Institute of Politics; Lu Xun Literature Academy
- Occupations: Novelist, general
- Writing career
- Pen name: Pudu (普度)
- Language: Chinese
- Period: 1979–present
- Genres: Novel, drama
- Notable work: The Sons of Red Lake
- Notable awards: 7th Mao Dun Literature Prize; 2008 The Sons of Red Lake

Zhou Daxin (Chinese: 周大新; pinyin: Zhōu Dàxīn; born 1952), also known by his pen name Pǔdù (普度), is a Chinese novelist who was the president of Henan Literature Academy.

== Biography ==
Zhou was born into a family of farming background in Dengzhou, Henan in 1952.

In 1970, after high school, Zhou joined the People's Liberation Army.

Zhou started to publish works in 1979. Zhou graduated from Xi'an Institute of Politics (西安政治学院) in 1985, then he entered Lu Xun Literary Institute.

Zhou joined the China Writers Association in 1988. In 1999, Zhou became the president of Henan Literature Academy (河南文学院).

== Works ==
=== Novellas ===
- Footsteps (向上的台阶)
- Silver Ornament (银饰)

=== Long-gestating novels ===
- Walking Out of the Basin (走出盆地)
- The 21 Building (21大厦)
- Legend of the War (战争传说)
- The Sons of Red Lake (湖光山色)
- Early Warning (预警)
- Fields of Joy (安魂)

=== Short stories ===
- The Han Chinese Girl (汉家女)
- The Golden Fields of Barley (金色的麦田)

=== Drama ===
- Woman Sesame Oil Maker (香魂女)

=== Translated works (English) ===
- After the Finale
- Fields of Joy
- Longevity Park
- The Sons of Red Lake

== Adaptations ==
One of his works have been adapted for film:

- Woman Sesame Oil Maker (1992) (directed by Xie Fei)

== Awards ==
- Woman Sesame Oil Maker – Berlin Film Festival Golden Bear Award (1999)
- Fengmu Literature Prize (2002)
- The Sons of Red Lake – 7th Mao Dun Literature Prize (2008)
