= Woman Sesame Oil Maker =

1993 film by Xie Fei

- Film poster

Chinese name
- Traditional Chinese: 香魂女
Transcriptions
Standard Mandarin
- Hanyu Pinyin: Xiāng hún nǚ
- Directed by: Xie Fei
- Written by: Xie Fei
- Story by: Zhou Daxin
- Starring: Siqin Gaowa
- Cinematography: Bao Xiaoran
- Edited by: Liu Jinwen; Zhang Qinghe
- Music by: Wang Liping
- Distributed by: Facets Multimedia (Region 1 DVD)
- Release dates: 1993 (China); February 16, 1994 (New York City)
- Running time: 105 minutes
- Country: China
- Language: Mandarin

Woman Sesame Oil Maker (Chinese: 香魂女; pinyin: Xiāng hún nǚ) is a 1993 Chinese drama film. It has been released in the United Kingdom under the title Women from the Lake of Scented Souls (the more literal translation) and more recently on DVD as Woman Sesame Oil Maker. The film is adapted from a novel by Zhou Daxin, The Fragrant Oil Mill by the Lake of Scented Souls (香魂塘畔的香油坊).

The film is adapted and directed by Xie Fei and tells the story of a woman in a small village in Hebei who runs a small sesame oil business that becomes unexpectedly successful, but who then uses her money to buy for her mentally disabled son a peasant bride.

The film won the Golden Bear for Best Film at the 43rd Berlin International Film Festival in 1993, a prize it shared with Ang Lee's The Wedding Banquet.

== Plot ==
Illiterate villager Second Sister Xiang (Siqin Gaowa) was sold as a tongyangxi (child bride) to her present husband, a man with a lame leg, when she was seven. She has an intellectually disabled son Dunzi, who has epileptic fits and is now grown up, and a younger daughter Zhi'er. Through her diligence she has started a successful sesame oil mill and now becomes the richest person in her village.

A Japanese businesswoman decides to invest in her business after visiting her mill. Meanwhile, Sister Xiang tries to find a bride for her son. She engineers her son's marriage with Huanhuan (Wu Yujuan), a peasant girl whose family is in dire financial straits.

One night, Dunzi nearly strangles Huanhuan to death during a fit. Huanhuan runs back home, but her mother-in-law makes sure she returns. Huanhuan witnesses her drunk father-in-law beating Sister Xiang in bed. She also chances on Sister Xiang in an adulterous affair with family friend Ren, who fathered her daughter Zhi'er.

Ren later initiates a break-up with Sister Xiang. Sister Xiang falls ill. She is heartbroken, despite her sesame oil being awarded top prize by the provincial government.

Sister Xiang gradually realizes that Huanhuan, like her, suffers as a kindred spirit. She decides to release Huanhuan by asking Huanhuan to go for a divorce. But Huanhuan states that her life is already ruined. She then breaks down.
