= Po-Chih Leong =

British-Hong Kong filmmaker (b. 1939)

- 梁普智
- Born: 31 December 1939 (age 86); Northampton, Northamptonshire, England
- Other names: Leung Po-Chi, Po-Chick Leong, Leong Po-Chih, Pochih Leung, Po-Chih Leong
- Education: University of Exeter; London Film School
- Occupations: Film director, television director, screenwriter
- Spouse: Mary Leong
- Relatives: Po Shun Leong (brother); Sze Tsung Leong (nephew)

Chinese name
- Traditional Chinese: 梁普智
- Simplified Chinese: 梁普智
Transcriptions
Standard Mandarin
- Hanyu Pinyin: Liáng Pǔzhì
Yue: Cantonese
- Jyutping: Loeng^{4} Pou^{2}-zi^{3}

Po-Chih Leong (Chinese: 梁普智; Jyutping: Loeng^{4} Pou^{2}-zi^{3}; born 31 December 1939) is a British and Hong Kong filmmaker. He was a figure in the Hong Kong New Wave, and was nominated for a Hong Kong Film Award for Best Director for the war drama film Hong Kong 1941 (1984). He has also directed films in Britain and the United States. He began his career as a trainee film editor at the BBC before joining TVB in 1967, where he set up its film unit in British Hong Kong.

== Early life and education ==
On 31 December 1939, Leong was born in Northampton to parents from Taishan, Guangdong. His father was a seaman who opened a Chinese restaurant in London's West End. Leong has two siblings; his younger brother is sculptor Po Shun Leong, and his nephew is photographer Sze Tsung Leong.

Leong attended Leighton Park School. He graduated with a Bachelor of Arts in Philosophy from the University of Exeter and studied at the London Film School.

== Career ==
Leong began his career as a trainee film editor at the BBC. Leong worked on a variety of productions, including the long-running series Panorama. In 1967, Leong joined TVB and set up its film unit in British Hong Kong. As an executive producer he also directed a number of entertainment programmes, including The Star Show. He left TVB in 1969 to form Adpower, one of the first commercial production companies in Hong Kong.

In 1976, Leong co-directed his first Hong Kong film Jumping Ash, an action film set in a drug underworld, where he also appeared in this film as Tiger's man. It was one of the two top-grossing films of the season. At the 23rd Hong Kong Film Festival, it was described as "the advance guard of the (Hong Kong) New Wave". He went on to direct a range of genres from drama to action movies, comedies, horror and satire, in both English and Chinese. Banana Cop (1984) was the story of a British–Chinese policeman who returns to Hong Kong to seek help with a case. It was the genesis for his first British film Ping Pong (1986), made for UK's Channel 4, the first English feature film set in Soho's Chinatown.

After Banana Cop, Leong turned to history for inspiration and made the award-winning movie Hong Kong 1941 (1984), starring Chow Yun Fat, set in Hong Kong during the early days of the Japanese invasion. Hong Kong 1941 was an oblique comment on the 1984 deal between Britain and China about Hong Kong's future. Leong and his film maker daughter, Sze Wing Leong, directed and filmed the effect of this deal up to and beyond the handover in Riding the Tiger (1997-1998), an eight part, observational documentary series for the UK's Channel 4.

Further pursuing his interest in history, Leong made a Hong Kong English-language movie, Shanghai 1920 (HK, 1990), set in Shanghai and starring John Lone, about the rise of the legendary Shanghai gangster Big-Eared Du.

His second British feature film, was the award-winning 1998 movie, The Wisdom of Crocodiles, starring Jude Law, Timothy Spall, and Kerry Fox, with notable references to Akira Kurosawas opus, especially Rashomon, and to Jean-Pierre Melville's Le Samouraï. In recent years Leong has made action films starring Steven Seagal, Wesley Snipes, Judd Nelson, Joe Mantegna, and Oscar-winning Marcia Gay Harden. He has directed films for US network television and AMC. In 2012, he reunited with Hong Kong producer Raymond Wong Bak Ming to direct the 3D movie, Baby Blues.

== Personal life ==
Leong is married to Mary Leong. His son James Leong is also a filmmaker.

== Filmography ==
=== Film ===
Year	Title	Functioned as		Notes
Year	Title	Director	Writer	Notes
1976	Jumping Ash (Chinese: 跳灰)	Yes	No	Co-director with Josephine Siao
1977	Foxbat (狐蝠)	Yes	Yes	
1979	Itchy Fingers (神偷妙探手多多)	Yes	Yes	
1980	No Big Deal (有你冇你)	Yes	No	
1981	Super Fool (龍咁威)	Yes	Yes	
1982	He Lives by Night (夜驚魂)	Yes	No	
1984	Hong Kong 1941 (等待黎明)	Yes	No	Nominated – Hong Kong Film Award Best Director
1984	Banana Cop (英倫琵琶)	Yes	No	
1985	The Island (生死線)	Yes	No	
1986	Welcome (補鑊英雄)	Yes	Yes	
1986	Ping Pong (乒乓)	Yes	No	
1988	Keep On Dancing (繼續跳舞)	Yes	No	
1988	Fatal Love (殺之戀)	Yes	No	
1991	Shanghai 1920 (上海1920)	Yes	No	Nominated – Chicago International Film Festival Best Feature
1998	The Wisdom of Crocodiles	Yes	No	Brussels International Festival of Fantasy Film Grand Prize of European Fantasy Film in Silver; Gérardmer Film Festival Special Jury Prize; Valenciennes International Festival of Action and Adventure Films Audience Award; Nominated – Sitges - Catalan International Film Festival Grand Prize of European Fantasy Film in Gold
2004	Out of Reach	Yes	No	
2006	The Detonator	Yes	No	
2013	Baby Blues	Yes	No	
2014	Bounty Hunter (賞金獵人)	Yes	No	
2017	The Jade Pendant (唐人街1871)	Yes	No	

==== Acting roles ====
Year	Title	Role	Notes
1976	Jumping Ash	Tiger's man	
1980	Dangerous Encounters of the First Kind	Head Interpol Officer	
1985	The Island	Tang San	
1986	Peking Opera Blues	Mr. Kam	
2014	Camera	Ming's father	
2015	Already Tomorrow in Hong Kong	Cab driver	

=== Television ===
Year	Title	Notes
1997-98	Riding the Tiger	Documentary series; 4 episodes
2000	Cabin by the Lake	TV movie
2000	The Darkling	TV movie
2001	Return to Cabin by the Lake	TV movie
2001	Wolf Lake	Episode: "Excitable Boy"
2001	Night Visions	Episode: "If a Tree Falls..."
2001	Spenser: Walking Shadow	TV movie
