= Luo Yan (screenwriter) =

Chinese actress and screenwriter (born 1956)

Luo Yan (Chinese: 罗燕; pinyin: Luó Yàn; born September 6, 1956) is a Chinese American actress and screenwriter. She was born in Urumqi, Xinjiang. After having a successful acting career in China, she came to the U.S. in the mid-1980s. She started her own business during the early 1990s and later became the first female Chinese filmmaker to produce, write, and star in a Hollywood film.

Both her parents were biology professors. She was raised by her grandparents in Shanghai. When she was 10 years old, her grandfather was arrested and held in concentration camps. He died shortly after his release and Yan Luo had to take responsibility and care for her ailing grandmother at a very young age.

While working at the Shanghai Textile Factory, she secretly took acting classes and became an active member of a local theater group. In 1977, she applied to the Shanghai Drama Institute and was one of only 20 to be accepted in her class.

Her break through in China came with the movie Female Student Dormitory in 1984. She then starred in The Girl in Red.

Starting in 1986, Yan Luo studied English with the hopes of receiving a scholarship to study outside of China. Six months later she received one to study at Boston University.

After working as a waitress, cleaning lady, baby sitter, and housekeeper during her time in Boston, she earned her master's degree in fine arts in 1990.

She then interned with the Los Angeles Theater Center and continued taking classes at UCLA, mainly focusing on film production.

In 1994, Yan Luo founded Moonstone International, an import-export company. Today the company reports annual sales of over $4 million and employs more than 20.

In 1996 she started to work on Pavilion of Women, a movie after the novel by Pearl S. Buck. In 1997 she decided to co-write the script and started production in 1999.
