= Sze Tsung Leong =

Sze Tsung Leong (born 1970) is an American and British photographer and artist interested in urban studies.

== Biography ==
Born in Mexico City, he grew up there and in Los Angeles. He then studied at the Art Center College of Design in Pasadena, California, and earned architecture degrees from the University of California, Berkeley and the Harvard Graduate School of Design, where he was awarded the Wheelwright Prize. Leong received the Guggenheim Fellowship in 2005. He now lives in New York City.

== Publications ==
- (contributor and co-editor) Harvard Project on the City (organized by Rem Koolhaas): volumes on Great Leap Forward and Guide to Shopping. Both vols. pub. Cologne, 2002.
- History Images. Photographs of urban spaces and construction projects in China. Steidl, 2007. ISBN 3-86521-274-3.
- Horizons. A collection of landscape photographs. Yossi Milo Gallery, 2008. ISBN 978-0-615-19227-7. Exhibition catalogue.
  - Berlin and Stuttgart: Hatje Cantz, 2014. ISBN 978-3-7757-3789-0. With essays by Pico Iyer, Duncan Forbes, Joshua Chuang, Leong, and Charlotte Cotton.

== Collections ==
Leong's work is held in the following permanent collections:

- Metropolitan Museum of Art, New York: 2 prints (as of 4 October 2021)
- Minneapolis Institute of Art, Minneapolis, MN: 1 print (as of 4 October 2021)
- Museum of Contemporary Photography, Chicago, IL: 2 prints (as of 4 October 2021)
- Museum of Modern Art, New York: 7 prints (as of 4 October 2021)
- San Francisco Museum of Modern Art, San Francisco: 4 prints (as of 4 October 2021)
