= Siqin Gaowa =

Chinese-born Swiss actress (born 1950)

Siqin Gaowa ᠰᠡᠴᠡᠨᠭᠤᠸ᠎ᠠ
- Born: 19 January 1950 (age 76); Guangzhou, Guangdong, China
- Citizenship: Swiss
- Occupation: Actress
- Years active: 1970–present
- Spouses: Sun Tiangxiang (m. 1968; div. 1976) Ao Xingchen (m. 1977; div. 1983) Chen Liangsheng (m. 1986; died 2022)
- Children: 2 (son and daughter)
- Awards: Golden Phoenix Awards; 1993 Special Contribution Award; Hong Kong Film Awards – Best Actress; 1984 Homecoming; 2007 The Postmodern Life of My Aunt Hong Kong Film Critics Society Awards – Best Actress; 1995 The Day the Sun Turned Cold; 2007 The Postmodern Life of My Aunt Golden Rooster Awards – Best Actress; 1982 Rickshaw Boy Hundred Flowers Awards – Best Actress; 1982 Rickshaw Boy Flying Apsaras Awards – Special Performance Award; 1996 Er Leng Ma, The Party Member

Siqin Gaowa (Mongolian Cyrillic Цэцэнгуа, Chinese: 斯琴高娃, born 19 January 1950), born Duan Anlin, is a Chinese-born Swiss actress. She was born in Guangzhou to a Han Chinese father and a Mongol Chinese mother. Her father died when she was 4, she was raised by her mother in Inner Mongolia. She has been married to musician Chen Liangsheng (陈亮声) since 1986 and currently holds Swiss citizenship together with her husband.

Siqin Gaowa made her debut in the 1981 film Anxious to Return, in which she plays Yuzhen, a woman that during the Sino-Japanese War saves a wounded soldier, and falls in love with him. She was awarded the Ministry of Culture's Youth Creativity Award for her performance. She achieved fame and garnered wide acclaim for her performance in the 1982 film Rickshaw Boy, an adaptation of Lao She's novel of the same title, in which she portrayed "Tigress", the love interest of Zhang Fengyi's character "Xiangzi". She won the Golden Rooster Award and Hundred Flowers Award for Best Actress that year.

In 1995, she was a member of the jury at the 45th Berlin International Film Festival.

Some of her most notable appearances in other movies include Kangxi Dynasty and Full Moon in New York. She won the award for Best Actress at the 4th Hong Kong Film Awards for Homecoming, becoming the first Mainland Chinese actress to win the honour. In 2008, she won her second Best Actress in the 27th Hong Kong Film Awards for her role in The Postmodern Life of My Aunt.

== Early life ==
Siqin Gaowa was born Duan Anlin in Guangzhou, Guangdong Province, China, on 20 January 1950. Her mother was a Mongolian woman, while her father was a Han Chinese army officer originally from the Shǎnxī Province, who was stationed in Guangzhou at the time of her birth. Her father died of an illness when Siqin Gaowa was four years old, and her mother subsequently moved back to Inner Mongolia with her.

She grew up in Ningcheng County, Inner Mongolia. She had a rough childhood in Inner Mongolia, where "life was hard, and material comforts rare". As a child, Siqin Gaowa showed a talent for dancing. When she was thirteen she was the choreographer and performer of her version of "Wine cup dance" (Zhongwan wu). In the mid 1960s she was selected to join as a dancer the singing and dance troupe of Hohhot.

With the Huhhot troupe she performed at music and dance programs of minority groups in Beijing. Sometime before the Cultural Revolution, however, she injured her foot, and had to give up her career as a dancer. She then decided to switch to acting.

Her stage name, Siqin Gaowa, means "beauty and wisdom" in Mongolian.

== Career ==
One of her first leading roles was in the movie Anxious to Return (1979) or Eagerly Homebound (Guixin sijian).

Siqin Gaowa became initially known for her performance in this movie. In the movie, she portrays the widow Yu Zhen, an honest peasant woman, who during the Sino-Japanese War saves and falls in love with a wounded soldier who is "trying to grapple with his conflicting emotions." For her portrayal in this movie, Siqin Gaowa won the Ministry of Culture's Youth Creativity Award in 1979. Her portrayal of Yu Zhen was followed by supporting roles in the movies Xu Mao and his Daughters (1981) (Chinese: Xu Mao he tade nǚ'ermen) and Dragons and Snakes of the Big Lake (1982) (Chinese: Daze long she).

She achieved fame and wide acclaim with her portrayal of Hunui in Rickshaw Boy (1982), literally translated, Camel Xiangzi (Chinese: Luotuo xiangzi). The film is based on Lao She's novel of the same name. For her interpretation of Hanui in Rickshaw boy, Siqin Gaowa was awarded the Hundred Flowers Award for Best Actress and the Golden Rooster Award for Best Actress in 1983.

In 1984 she was acclaimed for her portrayal of Azhen in the award-winning Homecoming (1984), literally translated, Time and Tide (Chinese: Sishui liunian). The film "tells the story of the journey of a woman, Shan Shan (Koo Mei-wah) from Hong Kong to her hometown in China to visit her childhood friends, Ah Chun (Siqin Gaowa), and Hao-chong (Tse Wai-hung)."

The movie was also selected as Hong Kong's entry for the Best Foreign Language Film at the 57th Academy Awards. For her performance in Homecoming she was awarded the 1985 Hong Kong Film Award for Best Actress.

In 1989, Siqin Gaowa starred in Full Moon in New York (1989), where she acted again alongside Koo. The movie tells about three Chinese women who immigrated to New York City from Hong Kong, Taiwan and the mainland, with Siquin Gaowa playing Zhao Hong from the mainland. At one point in the move the women carouse, and each one sings Chinese songs that are popular in her culture. The three immigrant women find themselves in New York without a physical home nor a homeland, they "each live and enact personal dramas of loss and displacement," but are finally depicted as happily together in the last scene.

In 1993, Siqin Gaowa played the lead role in Woman Sesame Oil Maker (1993), which tells the story of a woman in a small village in Hebei who runs a small sesame oil business that becomes unexpectedly successful, but who then uses her money to buy a peasant bride for her mentally disabled son. It was said that the woman, Xiang, "unforgettably played by Siqin Gaowa," brilliantly incarnates "the dilemma of women today, in China and elsewhere, torn between restrictive old traditions and deceptive new freedoms."

The film won the Golden Bear for Best Film at the 43rd Berlin International Film Festival in 1993, and Siquin Gaowa was awarded the 1993 Silver Hugo Award for Best Actress at the Chicago International Film Festival.

In 2006, Siqin Gaowa starred alongside Chow Yun-fat in The Postmodern Life of My Aunt, presented at the Toronto International Film Festival. The movie was positively received, and received several awards and nominations. For he performance in this movie Gaowa won several awards, including the 27th Hong Kong Film Award for Best Actress, and was nominated for the Golden Horse Award for Best Leading Actress at the 43rd Golden Horse Awards.

== Personal life ==
In 1968, at the age of 18, Siqin Gaowa married Inner Mongolia Film Studio director Sun Tianxiang. The couple had a daughter Sun Dan (born 1969) and son Sun Tie (born 1973), who would later become an actor himself. She divorced Sun in 1976. In 1977, Siqin Gaowa remarried to Ao Xingchen, a Chinese actor of Daur descent, and they divorced in 1983.

In 1986, she married Swiss-Chinese orchestra conductor Chen Liangsheng, who was also known as Robert Chen and was previously married to Argentine pianist Martha Argerich. The couple emigrated to Switzerland. Chen died on 28 February 2022, at the age of 89.

== Filmography ==
- Anxious to Return (1981)
- Rickshaw Boy (1982)
- Homecoming (1984)
- Wreaths at the Foot of the Mountain (1985)
- Full Moon in New York (1990)
- Woman Sesame Oil Maker (1993)
- Eunuch & Carpenter (1993)
- An Old Man and His Dog (1993)
- In the Heat of the Sun (1994)
- The Day the Sun Turned Cold (1994)
- Kangxi Dynasty (2001)
- Xiaozhuang Mishi (2003)
- Wu Zi Bei Ge (2006)
- The Postmodern Life of My Aunt (2006)
- Secret History of Empress Wu (2011)
- You Must Marry This Year (2011)
- Full Circle (2012)
- Happy Life of Yang Guang (2013)
- Switch (2013)
- Avalokitesvara (2013)
- Beijing Love Story (2014)
- One Day (2014)
- Lost in Wrestling (2015)
- An Accidental Shot of Love (2015)
- The Legend of Dragon Pearl (2017)
- The Lost Land (2018)
- Goodbye My Princess (2019)

== Awards and nominations ==
Siqin Gaowa has won nearly all the most prestigious awards in Asia, including China's two most prestigious awards in movie industry (Golden Rooster Awards and Hundred Flowers Awards) and the Hong Kong Film Award, Honk Kong's equivalent of the Academy Awards. She was nominated for Best Actress twice at the Golden Horse Awards.

Organisation	Year	Category	Project	Result	Ref.
Chicago International Film Festival	1992	Best Actress	Woman Sesame Oil Maker	Won	
China TV Drama Awards	2012	Lifetime Achievement Award	The Postmodern Life of My Aunt	Won	
College Student Film Festival	2006	Best Actress	The Postmodern Life of My Aunt	Won	
Feitian Awards	1998	Special Honor Performance Award	Dang yuan er leng ma	Won	
Golden Horse Awards	1990	Best Actress	A Woman and Seven Husbands	Nominated	
Golden Horse Awards	2006	Best Actress	The Postmodern Life of My Aunt	Nominated	
Golden Rooster Awards	1982	Best Actress	Rickshaw Boy	Won	
Hong Kong Film Award	1984	Best Actress	Homecoming	Won	
Hong Kong Film Award	2007	Best Actress	The Postmodern Life of My Aunt	Won	
Hong Kong Film Critics Society Award	1995	Best Actress	The Day the Sun Turned Cold	Won	
Hong Kong Film Critics Society Award	2007	Best Actress	The Postmodern Life of My Aunt	Won	
Huading Awards	2012	Audience's Favorite Stars		Won	
Huading Awards	2014	Media Popularity Award		Won	
Hundred Flowers Awards	1982	Best Actress	Rickshaw Boy	Won	
Ministry of Culture	1979	Youth Creativity Award	Anxious to Return	Won	
Shanghai Film Critics Awards	2006	Best Actress	The Postmodern Life of My Aunt	Won	
