= Erica Lee =

British artist (1888–1981)

- Born: 1888; Prestwich, England
- Died: 1981 (aged 92–93); Westminster, London
- Known for: Sculpture

Erica Lee (1888–1981) was a British artist and sculptor who specialised in portrait heads and busts.

== Biography ==
Lee was born at Prestwich, Lancashire (now in Greater Manchester) and studied under the sculptors Edwin Whitney Smith and Sir William Reid Dick in London. Lee established a studio in the St John's Wood area of London and worked as a professional sculptor for almost six decades. She created heads, busts and portrait reliefs in both bronze and terracotta. Other works created by Lee included memorials and grave markers, including one for the artist Sydney Lee, a relative.

Lee was a regular exhibitor at the Royal Scottish Academy in Edinburgh, with the Royal Glasgow Institute of the Fine Arts, at the Walker Art Gallery in Liverpool and at the Paris Salon where she was awarded an Honourable mention in 1930. Between the 1920s and 1960s, Lee showed a total of 43 works at the Royal Academy in London and exhibited 18 pieces with the Society of Women Artists.

Lee was a fellow of the Royal Society of British Sculptors and was elected to the Societe des Artistes Francais.
