= The Day the Sun Turned Cold =

1994 Hong Kong film by Yim Ho

- Film poster
- Traditional Chinese: 天國逆子
- Simplified Chinese: 天国逆子
- Literal meaning: disloyal son of the Heavenly Kingdom
- Hanyu Pinyin: Tiānguó nìzǐ
- Directed by: Yim Ho
- Written by: Yim Ho; Wong Hing-Dong
- Produced by: Yim Ho; Ann Hui
- Starring: Siqin Gaowa
- Cinematography: Hou Yong
- Edited by: Wong Yee-Shun
- Music by: Otomo Yoshihide
- Production company: Pineast Production
- Release date: 23 February 1995 (Hong Kong)
- Running time: 99 minutes
- Country: Hong Kong
- Language: Mandarin
- Budget: $HK5 million

The Day the Sun Turned Cold (Chinese: 天国逆子) is a 1994 Hong Kong drama film directed by Yim Ho. The film was selected as the Hong Kong entry for the Best Foreign Language Film at the 67th Academy Awards, but was not accepted as a nominee. The $HK5 million budget for the film was raised by Yim Ho. It was shot in northeastern China. The film won the Tokyo Grand Prix and Yim Ho won the Best Director award at the Tokyo International Film Festival.

== Cast ==
- Siqin Gaowa as Mother
- Tou Chung-hua as Guan Jian
- Ma Jingwu as Father
- Wei Zi as Lover
- Zhong Shu as Young Son
- Hu Li as Captain

== See also ==
- List of submissions to the 67th Academy Awards for Best Foreign Language Film
- List of Hong Kong submissions for the Academy Award for Best Foreign Language Film
