= Zhu Shimao =

Chinese comedian, sketch actor, and actor

- 朱时茂
- Born: 28 March 1954 (age 71); Linyi, Shandong, China
- Occupation(s): comedian, actor
- Years active: 1977–present
- Known for: The comedy, Eating Noodles (吃面条)
- Notable work: Eating Noodles
- Spouse: Fan Xuxia
- Children: 1

Zhu Shimao (simplified Chinese: 朱时茂; traditional Chinese: 朱時茂; pinyin: Zhū Shímào; born 28 March 1954) is a Chinese comedian, sketch actor, and actor. Zhu's comedy partner is Chen Peisi.

== Biography ==
In 1954, Zhu was born in Linyi, Shandong. Zhu joined the Chinese People's Liberation Army, he worked as an actor in the Fuzhou Military Region (福州军区). In 1983, he worked in August First Film Studio as an actor. In 1984, Zhu and his partner Chen Peisi performed Eating Noodles (吃面条) and became widely known. In 2000, Zhu and his partner Chen Peisi sued the China International Television Corporation, but they were banned by China Central Television.

== Personal life ==
Zhu married Fan Xuxia (范旭霞), the couple has a son named Zhu Qingyang (朱青阳; born 1991) .
