= A West Lake Moment =

- DVD cover
- Traditional Chinese: 鴛鴦蝴蝶
- Simplified Chinese: 鸳鸯蝴蝶
- Literal meaning: Mandarin Ducks and Butterflies
- Directed by: Yim Ho; Yang Zi
- Written by: Yim Ho; Zheng Xiao
- Produced by: Hu Bin; Lu Jun; Wu Bin; Yuan Litai; Zhang Jing; Zhang Wei
- Starring: Chen Kun; Zhou Xun
- Cinematography: Hang Sang Poon
- Edited by: Chow Cheung-Kan
- Music by: Yim Linq; Fernando Martinez
- Distributed by: Asia Video
- Release date: 15 July 2005
- Running time: 111 minutes
- Language: Mandarin

A West Lake Moment (Chinese: 鸳鸯蝴蝶; pinyin: Yuan Yang Hu Die) is a 2005 romantic comedy-drama film directed by Hong Kong directors Yim Ho and Yang Zi, and starring Chen Kun, Zhou Xun and Linq Yim. Aloys Chen and Zhou Xun had also previously collaborated as lovers in Balzac and the Little Chinese Seamstress and Baober in Love.

== Plot ==
Xiao Yu (Zhou), a barista and cake maker in a teahouse-café by Westlake in Hangzhou. Since a car crash long ago, she had been leading a peaceful life with her kind-hearted best friend and fellow car crash survivor Tong (Yim) who is unabashed in admitting that his feelings for Xiao Yu have developed into love.

One day A Qin (Chen) celebrates his birthday alone in her café. Xiao Yu's curiosity sparks off their dialogues and both discover they have many parallels. But A Qin is a player who is escaping to Hangzhou from the pressures of his relationships in Beijing and Xiao Yu is pursued by Tong ... What will be their choices?

== Cast ==
- Aloys Chen as Qin
- Zhou Xun as Xiao Yu
- Linq Yim as Tong
- Yan Xiang
- Zhang Yue

== Crew ==
- Direction by Yim Ho and Yang Zi
- Storyline by Yim Ho and Zheng Xiao
- Art direction by William Chang
- Cinematography by Hang Sang Poon
- Original soundtrack by Yim Linq and Fernando Martinez
