= Josephine Koo =

Chinese film actress

- Born: 1952 (age 73–74); Shanghai, China
- Years active: 1975–2004
- Awards: Golden Goblet Awards for Best Actress; 2004 Shanghai Story; Hong Kong Film Awards – Best New Performer; 1985 Homecoming Golden Horse Awards – Best Supporting Actress; 1992 To Liv(e)

Chinese name
- Traditional Chinese: 顧美華
- Simplified Chinese: 顾美华
Transcriptions
Standard Mandarin
- Hanyu Pinyin: Gù Měihuá

Josephine Koo Mei-Wah or Gu Meihua (Chinese: 顧美華) is a Chinese film actress. She had a bright start to her film career, starring in Yim Ho's Hong Kong New Wave classic Homecoming (1984). The film won her the Best New Performer Award at the Hong Kong Film Awards in 1985, and also a nomination for Best Actress, but she was beaten by Siqin Gaowa from the same film.

After Homecoming, Koo appeared in Yim Ho's Red Dust (1990), Stanley Kwan's Full Moon in New York (1990) and Evans Chan's To Live(e) (1992).

She disappeared from the screen in the late 1990s but suddenly returned in Peng Xiaolian's Shanghai Story (2004). For her role in this film, Koo was awarded the Best Actress Award at the Shanghai International Film Festival, beating out Zhang Ziyi and Joey Wong.

== Filmography ==
- Full Moon in New York (1989)
- Missing (2019)
- Cherry Returns (2016)
- Helios (2015)
- Tales from the Dark 1 (2013)
- Shanghai Story (2004)
