= Po Shun Leong =

Po Shun Leong (born 15 March 1941) is an English artist, former architect, sculptor and furniture maker. He was born at Northampton, England, and educated at the Quaker Leighton Park School in Berkshire, and then at the Architectural Association School of Architecture, in London, and has resided in Southern California since 1981. He is also known since the late 1980s for his highly intricate one-of-a-kind wood boxes, some now in museum collections. The Landscape box, a constantly evolving series since 1983 is architectural in character and built up of many different woods in their natural colors. They are inspired from ancient or legendary civilizations. He maintains a studio in the garden of his residence in the City of Winnetka in the San Fernando Valley, north west of Los Angeles. He continues to make elaborate wood objects and is developing a line of simple, sculpturally-inspired furniture.

== Biography ==
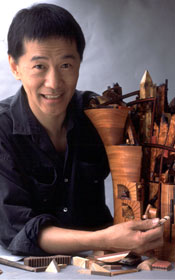
Po Shun Leong with an art box

Po Shun is the son of Ah Yow Leong and his second wife, Wright Jing (née Woo). Po Shun is the eighth child, initially raised in a family of nine siblings. His father, Ah Yow Leong was born in Toisan, southern China around 1891, eventually becoming a successful businessman in England. He started the Leong Trading Company and purchased a ship in Hong Kong to import goods to England. After the Second World War, with his export company inoperable, he opened the Universal Chinese Restaurant at 11 Denmark Street, Soho, London. He died in 1948 after falling down the stairs. Po Shun's mother, born Lai Jing Woo, came from the village of Shun Tuck Yoon, Guang Dong, China as the second wife to Po Shun's father. She was born on December 4, 1913, of the Chinese lunar year calendar. Po Shun's mother currently lives in the Los Angeles area, sharing time with Po Shun's family and his brother Po Chih.

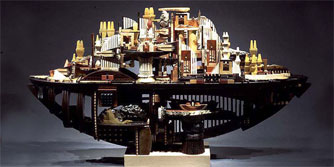
Ocean Liner Sculpture by Po Shun Leong

Po Shun was introduced to carpentry at the age of five when in 1946 he was sent to Holmewood House, a boarding school near Tunbridge Wells. At the age of eleven had a painting exhibited at the Royal Drawing Society in London and was awarded an honorable mention. His next school was Leighton Park, a Quaker school near Reading. He had his first one-man show when he was 17 years old in 1958 at the Hammersmith Art Gallery, London. It received a positive review in Artnews but no paintings were sold.

In 1958 he entered the Architectural Association School of Architecture, AA, in London and received a travel scholarship to France and Italy where he studied with Le Corbusier, with whom stayed in the monastery of La Tourette that Le Corbusier designed near the city of Lyon, France. Po Shun received a second travel scholarship to work/study in California with Architects Kistner, Wright & Wright. During college vacations, he worked with Sir William Holford and Partners in the City of London, planning buildings at the new University of Exeter.

Po Shun graduated in 1964. Foregoing graduation ceremonies, he traveled with friends to Calabria in Southern Italy to volunteer with Servicio Civile Internationale, a work project to construct an aqueduct in a poor village high up in the remote mountains. He then returned to England to design public housing for Cooperative Planning Ltd and the Brent Housing Authority. He joined the American Friends Service Committee and was sent to a remote part of Mexico, initially to help build a well in a village called Cuauhtenco.

The next year Po Shun joined CAPFCE, the Mexican school construction committee. He designed 27 secondary schools in the state of Michoacán. Most of the schools were in areas where roads did not exist. The prefabricated metal school structures were sometimes transported by mule or rafted over rivers. On his numerous visits to local villages, he was attracted to the great variety of ceramic, wood, metal and textile crafts.

During the 1968 Olympic Games in Mexico City, Po Shun worked in the Olympic Cultural Committee helping to organize the International Festival of Children's Mural Painting. He met Ruth Rivera, director of the Fine Arts Palace and the daughter of Diego Rivera. He lived for ten years in a house that she designed and had previously lived in. After the Olympics he joined Aluminio Deschamps SA to design aluminum and fiberglass building facades. In his spare time he painted landscapes in acrylics and had an exhibition at the Anglo Mexican Institute. He decided to apply for Mexican citizenship. In 1969 he married Poh Suan Leong, whom he met in college. She graduated in architecture and is from Penang, Malaysia.

For several years, Po Shun practiced architecture, designing a series of large furniture stores, residences and commercial exhibitions. He developed furniture designs and was awarded an Honorable Mention in the Knoll International Furniture Competition, two Gold Medal Awards for fiberglass furniture in the IMCE, Mexican Export Competition and two first prizes in the low cost furniture competition, awarded by President José López Portillo. He designed a low-cost egg incubator and received a Special Mention at the annual conference of the International Society of Industrial Designers. He became one of the Founding members of Mexican Association of Craft Designers and helped organize an exhibition of their products at the Museo de Arte Moderno.

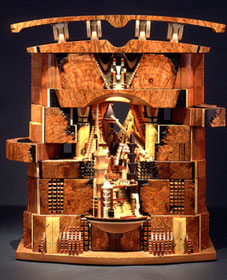
Art Box by Po Shun Leong

In 1981, the Leong family immigrated to Southern California. Po Shun hoped to make a living designing furniture. He set up a studio in the garage to produce prototypes and taught himself woodworking. The following year he received the Daphne Award for best dining chair in an American National Furniture Competition held in New York City, and the following year another two Daphne Awards.

With income from royalties not sufficient to support his family, and with time to spare, he began to make small wooden boxes to sell directly at local Los Angeles street craft shows. His first boxes - priced at two dollars each - sold well, so he continued to practice his skills and the boxes developed into the complex architectural pieces. Po Shun has made at least a thousand boxes and one-of-a-kind furniture objects. Po Shun is a member of the Furniture Society, a non-profit organization whose mission is to advance the art of furniture-making by inspiring creativity, promoting excellence, and fostering understanding of this art and its place in society.

He has exhibited throughout America and received numerous awards:

Best of Wood Award - American Crafts Exposition in Evanston
Craftsman Award - American Craft Exposition in Evanston
Craftsman Award - Philadelphia Craft Show
Best of Show - California Woodworking. Juror: Sam Maloof
Best of Show - American Craft Exposition in Evanston
Best of Art Furniture - the California Woodworking Show, Del Mar
Best of Show - awarded by vice President Walter Mondale at the American Craft Council Show in St. Paul, Minnesota
Artist in Residence for American Forests Famous and Historic Trees

== Selected bibliography ==
1984 Art That Works, Lloyd Herman ISBN 978-0-295-96937-4 Univ of Washington Press
1988 Contemporary Crafts For The Home, Bill Kraus ISBN 978-0-935603-18-7 Rockport Pub
1992 The Wright Style, Carla Lind ISBN 978-0-671-74959-0 Simon & Schuster
1993 Frank Lloyd Wright, Spencer Hart ISBN 978-1-56619-184-5 Barnes & Noble
1995 White House Collection of American Crafts, Michael Monroe ISBN 978-0-8109-4035-2 Harry N Abrams
1995 Award Winning Boxes, Tony Lydgate ISBN 978-0-8069-8841-2 Sterling
1995 Understanding Art, Fichner-Rathus ISBN 978-0-534-61362-4 Wadsworth Publishing
1997 Nouvelle Object III, Design House
1997 The Art Of Making Small Wood Boxes, Lydgate ISBN 978-0-8069-9576-2 Sterling
1998 The Best Of Wood Boxes, R Adam Blake ISBN 978-1-55870-476-3 Popular Woodworking Books
1999 Furniture Studio:The Heart of the Functional Arts, Furniture Society ISBN 978-0-9671004-0-1 Lyon Press
1999 The Woodworkers Visual Guide to Pricing, Kerry Pierce ISBN 978-1-55870-507-4 Popular Woodworking Books
1999 Chair Show3, Southern Highland Craft Guild.
2001 Chair Show 4, Southern Highland Craft Guild
2002 Celebrating Boxes, Stobart Davies ISBN 978-0-941936-73-6 Linden Publishing
Tradition in Contemporary Furniture, Furniture Society.
2002 Making Heirloom Boxes, Peter Lloyd ISBN 978-1-86108-176-6 Guild of Master Craftsmen
2003 Cabinets of Curiosities, Wood Turning Center
2003 Wood Art Today, Dona Meilach, ISBN 978-0-7643-1912-9 Schiffer Publishing
2004 500 Wood Boxes, Veronica Gunter, ISBN 978-1-57990-459-3 Lark Books
Celebrating Nature, Kevin Wallace Curator, Craft & Folk Art Museum, Los Angeles

=== Monograph ===
1998 PO SHUN LEONG -ART BOXES, Tony Lydgate ISBN 978-0-8069-7955-7. Sterling Publishing, N.Y.
