= Tom Jones impersonator =

A Tom Jones impersonator is someone who impersonates or imitates the look and sound of musician Tom Jones. Professional Tom Jones impersonators or Tom Jones tribute artists, perform all over the world as entertainers. Similarly to Elvis Presley and his impersonators, they offer an experience of having the next best thing.

== Notable performers ==
=== Asia and Pacific ===
Malaysia has its own version of Tom Jones. Tony Warren is known as "the Tom Jones of Malaysia". Warren, a former school teacher, built up his popularity in the 1980s, performing at venues such as the Copper Grill in The Weld on Jalan Raja Chulan, Kuala Lumpur. His act has taken him to Singapore, Jakarta, Cambodia and Australia. Similar to what happens with Tom Jones and females throwing their undergarments at him, Warren has had the same. In November 2010, Warren was given an all expenses paid trip to Australia to appear on a Telethon which was televised on Seven Network. While there he also performed at the Burswood Resort and Casino. In March 2011, Warren did a small show in Perth. As of 2011, Warren was appearing regularly at the Royal Selangor Club in Dataran Merdeka. Warren has released recordings that feature recordings by Jones, Engelbert Humperdinck and Elvis Presley. Warren opened for Air Supply in 2009. As a Tom Jones imitator, he has been referred to as the best in Asia.

=== United Kingdom ===
Sam Sorono was a Filipino singer from Bramley, Rotherham in England. A former actor in martial arts films, he had been an entertainer in the Philippines. He had performed with artists such as Count Basie and Ike and Tina Turner. He recorded his version of "Say You'll Stay Until Tomorrow" which appeared on the 1977 VA compilation Hit Sounds Vol. 8, released on the EMI label. He also recorded an album for EMI which was produced by Chris Babida. The album, Sam Sorono Sings Tom Jones' Greatest Hits was released in 1978. He shot to fame in 1991 as a result of appearing on Stars in Their Eyes, and was also the first act to appear on the Spanish version of the show. He died of cancer in 2008.

=== United States ===
Steve McCoy is a Tom Jones impersonator from Barrington, Camden County. He was referred to by Philly.com as the world's leading Tom Jones impersonator. In 1998, McCoy appeared at the Tom Jones Lovefest, an event organized by 32 records to celebrate the double CD release of Tom Jones - Greatest Performances. McCoy was the inspiration for Gale Martin's novel Who Killed 'Tom Jones'?. Tom Jones once said of McCoy, "He does me better than I do."

Harmik is a Tom Jones impersonator who has been copying the subject's act since he was 17 and bears a close resemblance to him. According to Bea Fogelman's book, ShowTime: Directory of Entertainment, Tom Jones once said to Harmik, "You look more like me than I do."

Jeff Gordon is a Tom Jones impersonator who has been singing Jones' songs for the past 20 years. In 2014, he started doing a Tom Jones Impersonator show and has been performing it across the US. Gordon also appeared in the play It's Not Unusual: The Tom Jones Story at the SPAA Theatre & Performing Arts Center in Park Forest, IL.

== Influenced but not impersonating ==
New Zealand singer Bunny Walters, who died in 2016, has been referred to as the Maori Tom Jones.

== Other cultural aspects ==
Similarly to Australia's Elvis impersonator Dean Vegas who performs weddings and the Las Vegas Elvis impersonators who perform wedding ceremonies, couples can get married in Las Vegas by a Tom Jones impersonator.
