= Michael Mak (director) =

Hong Kong film director

Michael Mak (born 16 August 1958) is a Hong Kong film director who is known for directing Dragon Force, Everlasting Love and Island of Greed. Michael was born in Hong Kong and his ancestral hometown is Mowming, Guangdong province.

== Background ==
He is the brother of film producer Johnny Mak. He was born in 1958 in Hong Kong.

== Career ==
=== 1980s ===
Mak had an acting role in the 1984 film, Behind the Yellow Line.

He directed the 1984 film Everlasting Love which starred Irene Wan and Lau Tak Wah.

=== 1990s to 2000s ===
The period action film Butterfly and Sword was released in 2003. It starred Michelle Yeoh as Sister Ko and Tony Leung as Sen who were trying to stop a revolutionary plot to overthrow the government. He directed the 1997 gangster epic, Island of Greed which was produced by his brother Johnny. Under his direction, he portrayed Taiwan as a Chinese version of Sicily where the politicians and triads were colluding together in an arrangement beneficial to both.

He directed the made-for-television film, Asian Charlie's Angels which was released in 2001. The film starred Christy Chung, Annie Wu and Kelly Lin.

Mak got to act again in the film in Kant Leung's Roaring Dragon, Bluffing Tiger which was released in 2003.

== Select filmography ==
DirectorFilm
Title	Producer	Year	Notes #
Chiu pei nui hok sang	Manfred Wong	1982	
Shen tan guang tou mei a.k.a. Dragon Force	Jai-Wen Ma	1982	
Everlasting Love	Johnny Mak	1984	
Huan Chang		1985	
Kai xin le yuan		1985	
Midnight Whispers	Johnny Mak	1986	Co-directed with David Lai
Long Arm of the Law: Part 2	Johnny Mak	1987	
Yue liang, xing xing, tai yang	Stephen Siu	1988	
Long Arm of the Law: Part 3	Stephen Siu	1989	
Ren hai gu hong	Wai-Chung Yip	1989	As Don Kit Mak
The Truth: Final Episode		1989	
Long Arm of the Law: Part 4	Johnny Mak	1990	
Sex and Zen	Johnny Mak	1991	
Wei xian qing ren	Jackie Chan	1992	
Butterfly and Sword	Yen-Ping Chu	1993	
Zhong e Lie Che da jie an		1995	
Island of Greed	Johnny Mak	1997	
Asian Charlie's Angels		2004	Made for television

ProducerFilm
Title	Director	Year	Notes #
Hai gen	Doug Chan, Chan-Bong Cheung, Kwok-Lap Lee; Suen-Ming Mak aka Michel Mak, Steven Siu; Raymond To	1995	
I Do	Chi-Sing Cheung	2000	
An Autumn Diary	Michael Mak		
Love Asia	Chun-Chun Wong	2006	Exec Prod
Nothing Is Impossible	Lam Wah-Chuen	2006	

Misc rolesFilm
Title	Role	Director	Producer	Year	Notes #
Shui er wu shi	Writer, Planner	Chuen-Yee Cha	Mona Fong	1985	
An Autumn Diary	Presenter	Kin-Lung Lam	Michael Mak	2002	
Twins Mission	Production administrative controller	To-Hoi Kong	Amy Li	2007	
