= Peace Hotel (film) =

1995 Hong Kong film by Wai Ka-fai

- Film poster
- Traditional Chinese: 和平飯店
- Jyutping: Wo4 Ping4 Faan6 Dim3
- Directed by: Wai Ka-fai
- Screenplay by: Wai Ka-fai
- Story by: Chow Yun-fat; Wai Kai-fai
- Produced by: John Woo
- Starring: Chow Yun-fat; Cecilia Yip
- Cinematography: Horace Wong
- Edited by: Chan Kei-hop; Tony Chow
- Music by: Cacine Wong; Healthy Poon
- Production company: Cassia Hill Production
- Distributed by: Golden Princess Film Production
- Release date: 4 December 1995
- Running time: 89 minutes
- Country: Hong Kong
- Language: Cantonese
- Box office: HK$24,829,983

Peace Hotel is a 1995 Hong Kong action western directed by Wai Ka-fai in his directorial debut, and produced by John Woo. It stars Chow Yun-fat and Cecilia Yip. Wai wrote the film's screenplay and co-wrote the story with Chow.

== Plot ==
Ten years before the film's era, Wong A-ping slaughters an entire troop of bandits himself, earning him the nickname Killer. His wife was killed during the chaos, but Wong ultimately spared a teenage member of the bandits. Afterwards, he set up a Peace Hotel to act as a sanctuary. The hotel has a rule that nobody can harm someone who has sought refuge in the hotel, but the hotel will not fight nor protect them once they leave.

One day, a penniless woman named Shau Shiu-man arrives at the hotel and claims to be an old lover of the hotel owner. The staff and guests give her food and let her stay in Wong's room. When Wong returns, Shau, who is bathing behind a curtain, lies to him, claiming to be one of the Soong sisters and at the same time, the daughter of Emperor Zhao Bing, while unsuccessfully trying to con money from him. At the hotel's restaurant, Shau sees Wong in person for the first time and tries to sell him some of his belongings that she had stolen from his room. She realizes who he is after seeing a picture of him in his pocketwatch that she stole and chokes on a sour plum she placed in her wine glass. Afterwards, Shau reveals that she is a clubgirl who is in debt and on the run after stabbing a loan shark. Wong refuses to let her stay and plans to send her off the next day.

Shau gambles with the guests and workers all night until a group of bandits from the Grand Hall arrive and Wong forces her to reveal that the loan shark she stabbed died from his wounds. Wong walks outside to confront the bandits and its leader, Ting Moon. Shau shot their leader after stabbing him and stole 30 gold bars. However, Wong declares he will not allow trouble inside the Peace Hotel and kills one of the bandits who tries to attack him. Ting is determined to kill Shau within 21 days and waits outside the hotel.

Infuriated, Wong tells his workers and other guests that Shau is not his lover and they beat her and make her work, torturing her when she makes poor tasting food. Shau unsuccessfully tries various ways to trick Wong into protecting her, leading him to continuously slap her, much to the delight to the workers and guests.

One night, Shau tries to seduce Wong until he bites her lip. She rants that Wong's reputation as The Killer is a joke and doesn't believe he can kill the bandits if they break in. Shortly after, Shau storms outside the hotel and is relentlessly beaten by the bandits. Wong grabs a flaming torch stick and beats the bandits and declares to Ting that he will kill anyone who dares to kill within the hotel. Wong then brings the gravely wounded Shau back into the hotel. He unsuccessfully tries to revive her with CPR. He then removes a sour plum stuck in her throat and she awakens.

While nursing Shau, Wong tells her his story. His warlord father taught him as a child that killing a couple of people makes him a killer and killing thousands of people makes him a hero, which he found to be true when he was twelve and killed seven adults who tortured and beat him. As he grew up, he formed his own gang and became notorious for his many killings until his wife was killed. He tells Shau she resembles his wife. At this time, two guests leave because they disagree with Wong's decision to save Shau. They are killed by the bandits. While Wong mourns their deaths and forges blades for revenge, Shau begins to sing. This reminds him of his dead wife and as times goes by, Wong and Shau's relationship blossoms.

Wong and Shau dance together before she leaves. Although Shau is reluctant to leave, he eventually convinces her. He confronts Ting and allows Ting to beat him with his rifle. It is revealed that Wong was a former leader of the bandits who killed the entire gang when a couple of them betrayed him and that Ting was the teenager that he spared years earlier. Ting reveals that Shau's real name is Lam Ling and is his mistress who slept with everyone in his gang. He purposely sent her to the Peace Hotel to cause Wong to break the hotel rules. Ting then declares he will launch a massacre in the Peace Hotel after sunset and warns everyone to leave. The guests and workers leave, but Ting does not keep his promise to spare them and prepares to massacre them until Shau arrives on a horse. Ting then shoots at Wong and a battle occurs where Wong and Ting slaughter numerous bandits with their swords until they fight each other. Their sword fight leads them inside the hotel where Wong eventually kills Ting. However, Wong is also gravely wounded. Shau unsuccessfully tries to revive him before leaving with his dead body. A child guest of the hotel during the events of the film, later narrates how the other guests separated afterwards and were killed by their enemies. Still later, he heard rumors that Wong was seen in Northeast China helping a young widow and her son in a hotel.

== Cast ==
- Chow Yun-fat as Wong A-ping (王阿平), infamously known as The Killer (殺人王), a former bandit and owner of the Peace Hotel
- Cecilia Yip as Shau Siu-man (蕭小曼), originally named Lam Ling (藍玲), an indebt clubgirl and swindler seeking refuge at the Peace Hotel
- Jacklyn Wu as A-ping's deceased wife (guest star)
- Chin Ho as Ting Moon (丁滿), a high ranking bandit of the Grand Hall who was Wong's follower when he was a young teenager
  - Sung Boon-chung as a young Ting Moon
- Lau Shun as a blind musician who is a guest
- Annabelle Lau as Skinny (奀妹), a guest
- Lo Fan as Bitch (八婆), a worker of Peace Hotel and Doggie's mother
- Mai Kei as a blind musician who is a guest
- Joe Cheng as a bandit
- Lee Siu-kei as a guest
- Victor Hon as a guest
- Nam Yin as a guest
- Terrence Fok as a guest
- Rankie Fung
- Gary Mak as a guest
- Yim Kong-ming as a bandit
- Patrick Hon as a guest
- Heung Tip as a guest
- Yip Chi-hung as a guest
- Lam Wei-hau
- Four Tse as a guest
- Yu Ngai-ho as a blind musician and a guest
- Chan Hing-hang as a guest
- Tang Cheung as a guest
- Yeung Wo as a guest
- Cheung Yuk-wah as a guest
- Choi Sai as a guest
- Bobby Yip as a bandit
- Law Wai-kai as a guest
- Leung Kei-hei as a bandit
- So Wai-nam as a bandit
- Lam Kwok-kit as a bandit
- Lui Siu-ming as a bandit
- Kong Foo-keung as a bandit
- Lee Tat-chiu as a bandit
- Tsim Siu-ling as a bandit
- Choi Kwok-ping as a bandit
- Lui Ying as a bandit
- Lau Tung-ching as a bandit
