= Homecoming (1984 film) =

1984 Hong Kong film by Yim Ho

- Film poster
- Traditional Chinese: 似水流年
- Literal meaning: years flow by like a river
- Hanyu Pinyin: sìshuǐliúnián
- Jyutping: ci5 seoi2 lau4 nin4
- Directed by: Yim Ho
- Written by: Liang Kong
- Produced by: Meng Xia
- Starring: Siqin Gaowa; Josephine Koo
- Cinematography: Hang Sang Poon
- Edited by: Kin Kin
- Music by: Kitarō
- Production company: Target Film
- Release date: September 6, 1984 (Hong Kong)
- Running time: 96 minutes
- Country: Hong Kong
- Language: Cantonese

Homecoming (似水流年) is a 1984 Hong Kong drama film directed by Yim Ho. It won the Best Film Award at the 4th Hong Kong Film Awards. The film was also selected as the Hong Kong entry for the Best Foreign Language Film at the 57th Academy Awards, but was not accepted as a nominee.

== Cast ==
- Josephine Koo as Coral Zhang
- Siqin Gaowa as Pearl (as Gaowa Siqin)
- Weixiang Xie
- Yun Zhou

== Awards and nominations ==
4th Hong Kong Film Awards

- Won: Best Film
- Won: Best Director - Yim Ho
- Won: Best Actress - Siqin Gaowa
- Won: Best Newcomer - Josephine Koo
- Won: Best Screenplay
- Won: Best Art Direction
- Nominated: Best Actress
- Nominated: Best Cinematography
- Nominated: Best Editing
- Nominated: Best Music - Kitarō
- Nominated: Best Song - Anita Mui (singer), Kitarō (composer), Zeng Gwok-gong (lyricist)

== See also ==
- List of submissions to the 57th Academy Awards for Best Foreign Language Film
- List of Hong Kong submissions for the Academy Award for Best Foreign Language Film
