= Wong Kar-wai filmography =

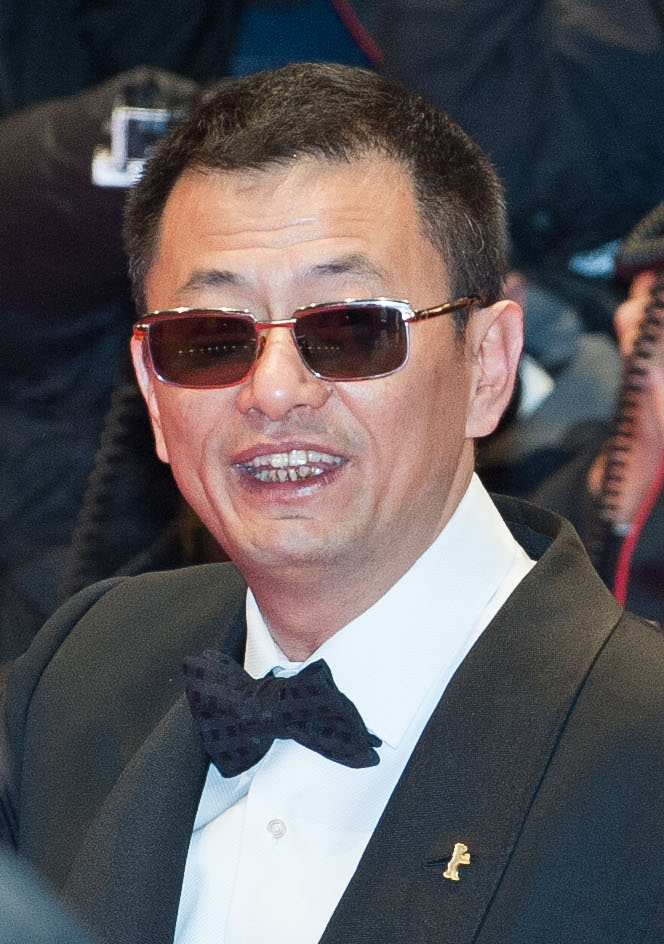
Wong at the 2013 Berlin Film Festival

Wong Kar-wai (born 17 July 1958) is a Hong Kong film director, screenwriter and producer. He began his career as a screenwriter in 1982, then made his directoral debut in 1988. As of 2019, he has directed 10 feature films. He has also worked as producer on several films he did not direct. Wong has also directed short films, commercials, and two music videos.

== Filmography ==
=== Feature films ===
Regarding Wong's early work as a screenwriter, film scholar Peter Brunette noted that "different transcription systems from Chinese make compiling a filmography for a Chinese director an exercise in creativity and hope." Wong also claims to have contributed to c. 50 film scripts without official credit so a full filmography is difficult to provide.

Year	Title	Credited as			Chinese title
Year	Title	Director	Writer	Producer	Chinese title
1982	Once Upon a Rainbow	No	Yes	No	彩雲曲 Choi wan kuk
1983	Just for Fun	No	Yes	No	空心大少爺 Kong xin da shao ye
1984	Intellectual Trio	No	Yes	No	龍鳳智多星 Long feng zhi duo xing
1984	Silent Romance	No	Yes	No	伊人再見 Yi ren zai jian
1985	Chase a Fortune	No	Yes	No	吉人天相 Xiao hu xian
1985	Unforgettable Fantasy	No	Yes	No	小狐仙 Ji ren tian xiang
1986	Rosa	No	Yes	No	神勇雙響炮續集 Shen yong shuang xiang pao xu ji
1986	Goodbye, My Hero	No	Yes	No	惡男 E Nan
1986	Sweet Surrender	No	Yes	No	我要金龜婿 Wo yao jin gui xu
1987	Final Victory	No	Yes	No	最後勝利 Zui hou sheng li
1987	Flaming Brothers	No	Yes	Executive	江湖龍虎鬥 Gong woo lung foo moon
1987	The Haunted Cop Shop	No	Yes	No	猛鬼差館 Meng gui chai guan
1988	The Haunted Cop Shop II	No	Yes	No	猛鬼學堂 Meng gui xue tang
1988	As Tears Go By	Yes	Yes	No	旺角卡門 Wong gok ka moon
1988	Walk on Fire	No	Yes	No	獵鷹計劃Lie ying ji hua
1990	Return Engagement	No	Yes	No	再戰江湖 Choi saan gong woo
1990	Days of Being Wild	Yes	Yes	No	阿飛正傳 Ah fei zing zyun
1991	Saviour of the Soul	No	Yes	No	九神鵰俠侶Gau yat san diu hap lu
1993	The Eagle Shooting Heroes	No	No	Yes	射鵰英雄傳之東成西就Se diu ying hung cyun zi dung sing sai jau
1994	Chungking Express	Yes	Yes	Yes	重慶森林 Chung Hing sam lam
1994	Ashes of Time	Yes	Yes	Yes	東邪西毒 Dung che sai duk
1995	Fallen Angels	Yes	Yes	Executive	墮落天使 Do lok tin si
1997	Happy Together	Yes	Yes	Executive	春光乍洩 Chun gwong cha sit
1998	First Love: Litter on the Breeze	No	No	Yes	初纏戀后的二人世界 Choh chin luen hau dik yi yan sai gaai
2000	In the Mood for Love	Yes	Yes	Yes	花樣年華 Fa yeung nin wa
2002	Chinese Odyssey 2002	No	No	Yes	天下無雙 Tian xia wu shuang
2004	2046	Yes	Yes	Yes	2046
2007	My Blueberry Nights	Yes	Yes	Yes	藍莓之夜
2008	Miao Miao	No	Yes	No	渺渺 Miǎomiǎo
2013	The Grandmaster	Yes	Yes	Yes	一代宗師 Yi dai zong shi
2016	Xuanzang	No	No	Yes	大唐玄奘 Da Tang Xuanzang
2016	See You Tomorrow	No	Yes	Yes	擺渡人 Baidu Ren
2018	Jinpa	No	No	Yes	撞死了只羊 Zhuàng sǐle yī zhǐ yáng
2021	One for the Road	No	No	Yes	一杯上路

=== Short films ===
Year	Title	Credited as			Notes
Year	Title	Director	Writer	Producer	Notes
2000	The Ages of Bloom	Yes	No	No	
2001	In the Mood for Love 2001	Yes	Yes	Yes	Short film released after the homonym feature film
2001	The Follow	Yes	No	No	Part of The Hire series for BMW
2004	The Hand	Yes	Yes	Yes	Segment of Eros
2007	I Travelled 9000 km to Give It to You	Yes	Yes	Yes	Segment of To Each His Own Cinema
2024	Hao Jiu Bu Jian	Yes	Yes	Yes	Extra chapter of Blossoms Shanghai

=== Television ===
Year	Title	Credited as		Notes
Year	Title	Director	Producer	Notes
2023–2024	Blossoms Shanghai	Yes	Yes	30 episodes
TBA	Paradise Guesthouse	Yes	No	Pre-production

=== Commercials ===
Year	Title	Credited as			Notes
Year	Title	Director	Writer	Producer	Notes
1996	wkw/tk/1996@7'55"hk.net	Yes	No	No	For Takeo Kikuchi
1998	Motorola	Yes	No	No	For Motorola StarTAC
2000	Un Matin Partout Dans Le Monde	Yes	No	No	For JCDecaux
2000	Suntime Red Wine CF	Yes	No	No	For Suntime Red Wine
2001	Dans la Ville	Yes	No	No	For Orange France
2002	La Rencontre	Yes	No	No	For Lacoste
2005	Capture Totale	Yes	No	No	For Dior
2006	Hypnôse Homme	Yes	No	No	For Lancôme Paris
2007	There's Only One Sun	Yes	Yes	No	For Philips
2007	Midnight Poison	Yes	No	No	For Dior
2007	SoftBank	Yes	No	No	For SoftBank
2008	Blueberry Days	Yes	No	No	For Louis Vuitton
2011	Mask	Yes	No	No	For Shu Uemura
2012	Déjà Vu	Yes	Yes	No	For Chivas Regal
2014	Regeneration	Yes	No	No	For Maysu
2017	Typhoon Planet	Yes	Yes	No	For Paul & Shark
2019	Self 05	Yes	No	No	For Saint Laurent
2021	2021 Mercedes-Benz CNY Campaign	No	No	Yes	For Mercedes-Benz
2022	Beauty Beyond Time	Yes	No	No	For Helena Rubinstein
2022	Once / Ten Thousand Cups at First Sight	Yes	No	Yes	For Tasogare Coffee
2024	(Blossoms)	No	No	Yes	For Canon

=== Music videos ===
Year	Title	Artist
1992	"To Make You Happy"	Tracy Huang
2000	"Hua Yang Nian Hua"	Tony Leung Chiu-wai
2002	"Six Days"	DJ Shadow

== See also ==
- List of awards and nominations received by Wong Kar-wai

== Bibliography ==
- Brunette, Peter (2005). Wong Kar-wai. Champaign, IL: University of Illinois Press. ISBN 0252095472.
- Stokes, Lisa Odham; Hoover, Michael (1999). City on Fire: Hong Kong Cinema. London: Verso. ISBN 1859842038.
