= List of awards and nominations received by Wong Kar-wai =

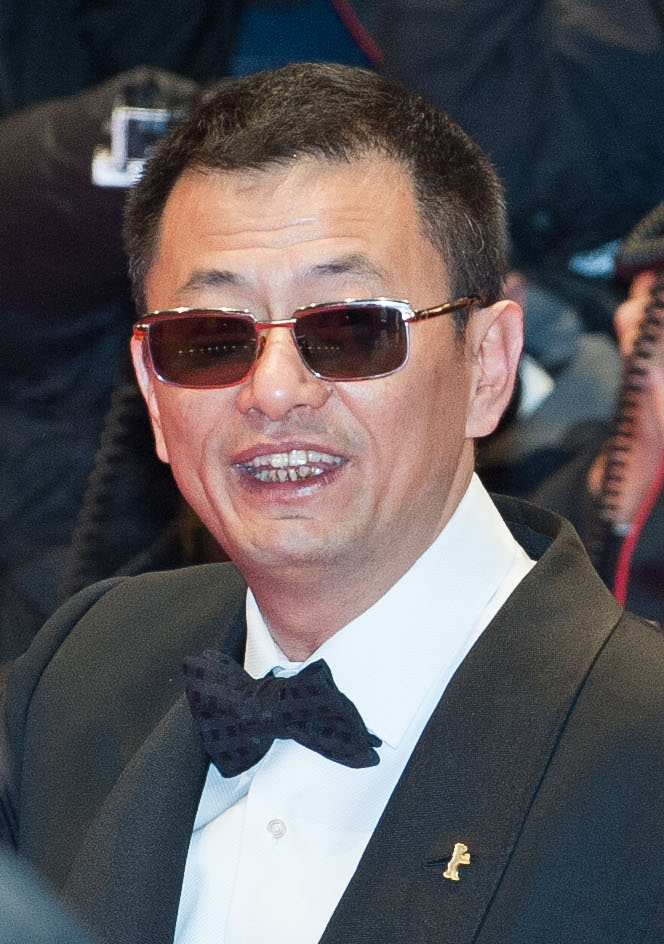
Wong at the 2013 Berlin Film Festival

Wong Kar-wai (born 17 July 1958) is a Hong Kong filmmaker. He has received awards and nominations from organisations around the world, recognising his achievements as a director, screenwriter, and producer.

== Awards ==
Sortable table of awards and nominations for Wong Kar-wai
Award	Year	Film	Category	Result
Alliance of Women Film Journalists	2013	The Grandmaster	Best Foreign Film	Nominated
Argentine Film Critics Association	2002	In the Mood for Love	Best Foreign Film	Won
Argentine Film Critics Association	2006	2046	Best Foreign Film	Nominated
Arizona International Film Festival	1997	Happy Together	Best Foreign Film – Audience Award	Nominated
Asia-Pacific Film Festival	1991	Days of Being Wild	Best Director	Won
Asia-Pacific Film Festival	2013	The Grandmaster	Best Film	Nominated
Asia-Pacific Film Festival	2013	The Grandmaster	Best Director	Nominated
Asian Film Awards	2013	The Grandmaster	Best Director	Won
Asian Film Awards	2013	The Grandmaster	Best Screenwriter	Nominated
Australian Film Institute	2001	In the Mood for Love	Best Foreign Film	Nominated
BAFTA Awards	2001	In the Mood for Love	Best Foreign Film	Nominated
Beijing International Film Festival	2014	The Grandmaster	Best Director	Won
Berlin International Film Festival	2001	Hua yang de nian hua	Best Short Film	Nominated
Bodil Awards	2002	In the Mood for Love	Best Non-American Film	Nominated
Cannes Film Festival	1997	Happy Together	Palme d'Or	Nominated
Cannes Film Festival	1997	Happy Together	Best Director	Won
Cannes Film Festival	2000	In the Mood for Love	Palme d'Or	Nominated
Cannes Film Festival	2004	2046	Palme d'Or	Nominated
Cannes Film Festival	2007	My Blueberry Nights	Palme d'Or	Nominated
Chicago International Film Festival	1994	Chungking Express	Best Film	Nominated
Chicago International Film Festival	2003	Six Days	Best Short Film	Nominated
César Awards	2001	In the Mood for Love	Best Foreign Film	Won
David di Donatello Awards	2000	In the Mood for Love	Best Foreign Film	Nominated
David di Donatello Awards	2005	2046	Best Foreign Film	Nominated
Directors Guild of Great Britain	2004	2046	Best Director – Foreign Film	Nominated
European Film Awards	2000	In the Mood for Love	Best Non-European Film	Won
European Film Awards	2004	2046	Best Non-European Film	Won
German Film Awards	2001	In the Mood for Love	Best Foreign Film	Won
Ghent International Film Festival	2000	In the Mood for Love	Grand Prix	Nominated
Golden Horse Film Festival	1988	As Tears Go By	Best Director	Nominated
Golden Horse Film Festival	1991	Days of Being Wild	Best Director	Won
Golden Horse Film Festival	1994	Chungking Express	Best Director	Nominated
Golden Horse Film Festival	1994	Ashes of Time	Best Adapted Screenplay	Nominated
Golden Horse Film Festival	1997	Happy Together	Best Director	Nominated
Golden Horse Film Festival	2000	In the Mood for Love	Best Director	Nominated
Golden Horse Film Festival	2000	In the Mood for Love	Best Original Screenplay	Nominated
Golden Horse Film Festival	2013	The Grandmaster	Best Director	Nominated
Golden Rooster Awards	2013	The Grandmaster	Best Director	Nominated
Filmfest Hamburg	2000	—	Douglas Sirk Award	Won
Hong Kong Film Awards	1988	Final Victory	Best Screenplay	Nominated
Hong Kong Film Awards	1989	As Tears Go By	Best Film	Nominated
Hong Kong Film Awards	1989	As Tears Go By	Best Director	Nominated
Hong Kong Film Awards	1991	Days of Being Wild	Best Film	Won
Hong Kong Film Awards	1991	Days of Being Wild	Best Director	Won
Hong Kong Film Awards	1991	Days of Being Wild	Best Screenplay	Nominated
Hong Kong Film Awards	1995	Chungking Express	Best Film	Won
Hong Kong Film Awards	1995	Ashes of Time	Best Film	Nominated
Hong Kong Film Awards	1995	Chungking Express	Best Director	Won
Hong Kong Film Awards	1995	Ashes of Time	Best Director	Nominated
Hong Kong Film Awards	1995	Chungking Express	Best Screenplay	Nominated
Hong Kong Film Awards	1995	Ashes of Time	Best Screenplay	Nominated
Hong Kong Film Awards	1996	Fallen Angels	Best Film	Nominated
Hong Kong Film Awards	1996	Fallen Angels	Best Director	Nominated
Hong Kong Film Awards	1998	Happy Together	Best Film	Nominated
Hong Kong Film Awards	1998	Happy Together	Best Director	Nominated
Hong Kong Film Awards	2001	In the Mood For Love	Best Film	Nominated
Hong Kong Film Awards	2001	In the Mood For Love	Best Director	Nominated
Hong Kong Film Awards	2001	In the Mood For Love	Best Screenplay	Nominated
Hong Kong Film Awards	2005	2046	Best Film	Nominated
Hong Kong Film Awards	2005	2046	Best Director	Nominated
Hong Kong Film Awards	2005	2046	Best Screenplay	Nominated
Hong Kong Film Awards	2014	The Grandmaster	Best Film	Won
Hong Kong Film Awards	2014	The Grandmaster	Best Director	Won
Hong Kong Film Awards	2014	The Grandmaster	Best Screenplay	Won
Hong Kong Film Critics Society Award	1994	Ashes of Time	Best Film	Won
Hong Kong Film Critics Society Award	1994	Ashes of Time	Best Director	Won
Hong Kong Film Critics Society Award	2000	In the Mood For Love	Best Director	Won
Hong Kong Film Critics Society Award	2014	The Grandmaster	Best Film	Won
Hundred Flowers Awards	2014	The Grandmaster	Best Film	Won
Hundred Flowers Awards	2014	The Grandmaster	Best Director	Nominated
Hundred Flowers Awards	2014	The Grandmaster	Best Screenplay	Nominated
Independent Spirit Awards	1997	Chungking Express	Best Foreign Film	Nominated
Independent Spirit Awards	1998	Happy Together	Best Foreign Film	Nominated
Independent Spirit Awards	2000	In the Mood For Love	Best Foreign Film	Nominated
Locarno International Film Festival	1994	Chungking Express	Golden Leopard	Nominated
Los Angeles Film Critics Association Awards	2001	In the Mood For Love	Best Foreign Film	2nd Place
Los Angeles Film Critics Association Awards	2005	2046	Best Foreign Film	2nd Place
Festival du nouveau cinéma	2000	In the Mood For Love	Best Film	Won
Three Continents Festival	1991	Days of Being Wild	Golden Montgolfiere	Nominated
Three Continents Festival	1995	Ashes of Time	Golden Montgolfiere	Nominated
National Society of Film Critics Awards	2001	In the Mood For Love	Best Foreign Film	Won
National Society of Film Critics Awards	2005	2046	Best Foreign Film	2nd Place
National Society of Film Critics Awards	2005	2046	Best Director	2nd Place
New York Film Critics Circle Awards	2001	In the Mood For Love	Best Foreign Film	Won
New York Film Critics Circle Awards	2005	2046	Best Foreign Film	Won
New York Film Critics Circle Awards	2005	2046	Best Director	Nominated
Robert Awards	2006	2046	Best Non-American Film	Nominated
Stockholm International Film Festival	1994	Chungking Express	FIPRESCI Prize	Won
Stockholm International Film Festival	2008	—	Visionary Award	Won
Tallinn Black Nights Film Festival	2004	2046	Grand Prix	Nominated
Valdivia International Film Festival	2001	In the Mood For Love	Best Film	Won
Valladolid International Film Festival	2004	2046	FIPRESCI Prize	Won
Venice International Film Festival	1994	Ashes of Time	Golden Lion	Nominated

== See also ==
- Wong Kar-wai filmography
