= European Film Award for Best Non-European Film =

European Film Award for Best Non-European Film also known as Prix Screen International. Wong Kar-Wai is the only director who has received this award more than once, with two wins.

== Winners and nominees ==
Year	English title	Original title	Director(s)	Country
1996 (9th)
1996 (9th)	Dead Man		Jim Jarmusch	United States
1997 (10th)
1997 (10th)	Hana-bi		Takeshi Kitano	Japan
1997 (10th)	Donnie Brasco		Mike Newell	United States
1997 (10th)	Everyone Says I Love You		Woody Allen	United States
1997 (10th)	Jerry Maguire		Cameron Crowe	United States
1997 (10th)	Swingers		Doug Liman	United States
1997 (10th)	Romeo + Juliet		Baz Luhrmann	United States
1998 (11th)
1998 (11th)	The Truman Show		Peter Weir	United States
1998 (11th)	Boogie Nights		Paul Thomas Anderson	United States
1998 (11th)	Deconstructing Harry		Woody Allen	United States
1998 (11th)	The Castle		Rob Sitch	Australia
1998 (11th)	Saving Private Ryan		Steven Spielberg	United States
1998 (11th)	The Big Lebowski		Joel Coen	United States
1999 (12th)
1999 (12th)	The Straight Story		David Lynch	United States
1999 (12th)	American Beauty		Sam Mendes	United States
1999 (12th)	Boys Don't Cry		Kimberly Peirce	United States
1999 (12th)	Not One Less	一個都不能少	Zhang Yimou	China
1999 (12th)	The Cup	Phörpa	Khyentse Norbu	Bhutan, Australia
2000 (13th)
2000 (13th)	In the Mood for Love	花樣年華	Wong Kar-Wai	Hong Kong
2000 (13th)	Yi Yi		Edward Yang	Taiwan
2000 (13th)	Crouching Tiger, Hidden Dragon	臥虎藏龍	Ang Lee	Hong Kong, China
2000 (13th)	Erin Brockovich		Steven Soderbergh	United States
2000 (13th)	Gladiator		Ridley Scott	United States
2000 (13th)	O Brother, Where Art Thou?		Joel Coen	United States
2001 (14th)
2001 (14th)	Moulin Rouge!		Baz Luhrmann	Australia, United States
2001 (14th)	Baran	باران	Majid Majidi	Iran
2001 (14th)	Lagaan	Lagaan	Ashutosh Gowariker	India
2001 (14th)	Millennium Mambo	千禧曼波	Hou Hsiao-hsien	Taiwan
2001 (14th)	Monsoon Wedding		Mira Nair	United Kingdom, USA, India
2001 (14th)	The Believer		Henry Bean	United States
2002 (15th)
2002 (15th)	Divine Intervention	يد إلهية	Elia Suleiman	Palestine, France, Morocco, Germany
2002 (15th)	8 Mile		Curtis Hanson	United States, Germany
2002 (15th)	City Of God	Cidade de Deus	Fernando Meirelles	Brasil, France
2002 (15th)	My Big Fat Greek Wedding		Joel Zwick	United States
2002 (15th)	Spider		David Cronenberg	Canada, United Kingdom, France
2002 (15th)	Spirited Away	千と千尋の神隠し	Hayao Miyazaki	Japan
2003 (16th)
2003 (16th)	The Barbarian Invasions	Les Invasions barbares	Denys Arcand	Canada
2003 (16th)	21 Grams		Alejandro González Iñárritu	United States
2003 (16th)	Finding Nemo		Andrew Stanton, Lee Unkrich	United States
2003 (16th)	Kill Bill: Volume 1		Quentin Tarantino	United States
2003 (16th)	Lost In Translation		Sophia Coppola	United States, Japan
2003 (16th)	Mystic River		Clint Eastwood	United States
2003 (16th)	Spring, Summer, Fall, Winter... And Spring	봄 여름 가을 겨울 그리고 봄	Kim Ki-duk	South Korea, Germany
2003 (16th)	The Blind Swordsman: Zatoichi	座頭市	Takeshi Kitano	Japan
2004 (17th)
2004 (17th)	2046		Wong Kar-Wai	China, France, Italy, Germany
2005 (18th)
2005 (18th)	Good Night, and Good Luck		George Clooney	United States
