= Wong Kar-wai =

Hong Kong filmmaker (born 1958)

Wong Kar-wai BBS
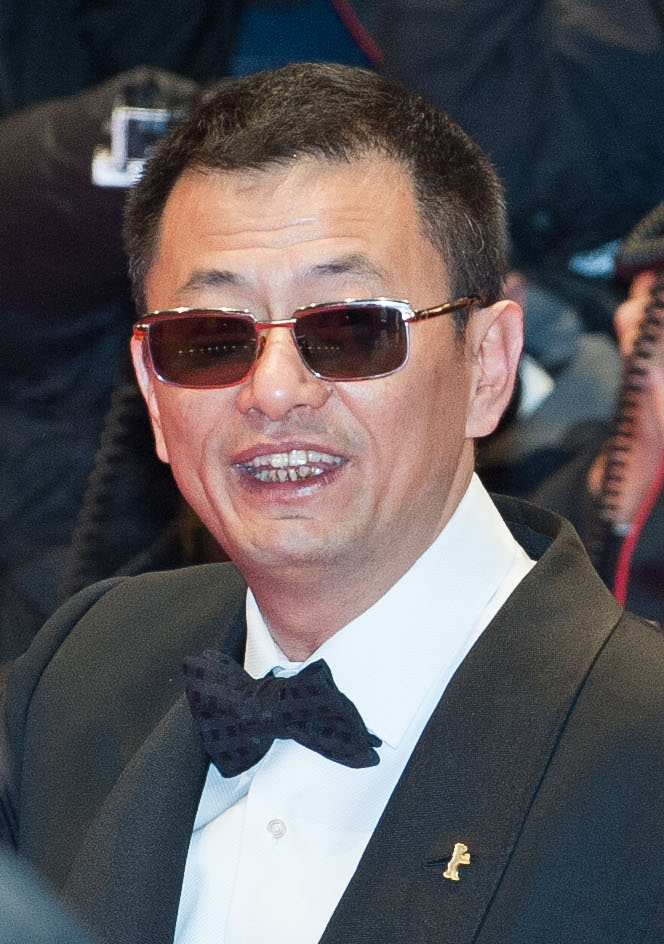
- Wong at the 2013 Berlin Film Festival
- Born: 17 July 1958 (age 68); Shanghai, China
- Occupations: Director; screenwriter; producer
- Years active: 1982–present
- Spouse: Esther Chen (m. 1985)
- Children: 1
- Awards: Full list

Chinese name
- Traditional Chinese: 王家衛
- Simplified Chinese: 王家卫
Transcriptions
Standard Mandarin
- Hanyu Pinyin: Wáng Jiāwèi
Wu
- Wugniu: ^{6}Waon-Cia_{1}-we_{6}
Yue: Cantonese
- Jyutping: Wong^{4} Gaa^{1}wai^{6}
- IPA: [wɔŋ˩ ka˥.wɐj˨]

Signature
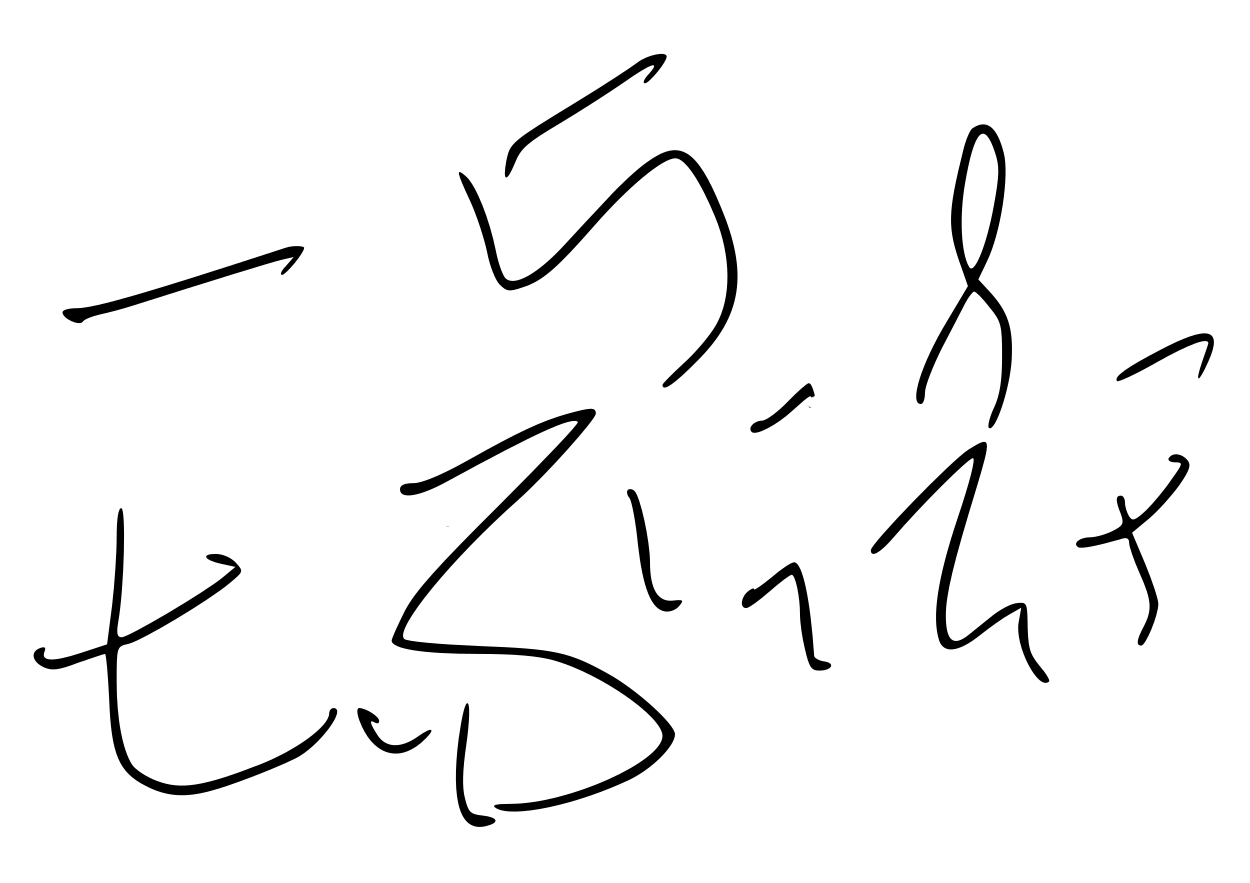

Wong Kar-wai BBS (born 17 July 1958) is a Hong Kong filmmaker. His films are characterised by nonlinear narratives, atmospheric music, and vivid cinematography with bold, saturated colours. An auteur of Hong Kong cinema, Wong frequently appears at international film festivals.

Born in Shanghai, Wong emigrated to Hong Kong as a child with his family. He began a career as a screenwriter for soap operas before transitioning to directing with his debut, the crime drama As Tears Go By (1988). As Tears Go By was fairly successful in Hong Kong, but Wong moved away from the contemporary trend of crime and action movies to embark on more personal filmmaking. Days of Being Wild (1990), his first venture in such a direction, did not perform well at the box office, but received critical acclaim and won Best Film and Best Director at the 1991 Hong Kong Film Awards. His next film, Ashes of Time (1994), met with a mixed reception because of its vague plot and atypical take on the wuxia genre.

Exhausted by the time-consuming production of Ashes of Time, Wong directed Chungking Express (1994), a smaller film that he hoped would rekindle his love of cinema during a two-month sabbatical while waiting for post-production equipment to arrive for Ashes of Time. (Note: While Wong made Chungking Express after Ashes of Time, Chungking was released before Ashes.) The film, with its more lighthearted atmosphere, catapulted Wong to international prominence, and won Best Film and Best Director at the 1995 Hong Kong Film Awards. Wong followed up with the crime thriller Fallen Angels (1995), which has since become a cult classic of the Golden Age of Hong Kong cinema and is considered especially representative of Wong's style. Wong consolidated his reputation with the 1997 drama Happy Together, for which he won Best Director at the Cannes Film Festival.

The 2000 drama In the Mood for Love, revered for its lush visuals and subtle storytelling, concretely established Wong's trademark filmmaking style. Among his other works are 2046 (2004), a romantic drama and science fiction film, and The Grandmaster (2013), a biopic of Ip Man, both of which received awards and nominations worldwide.

== Early life ==
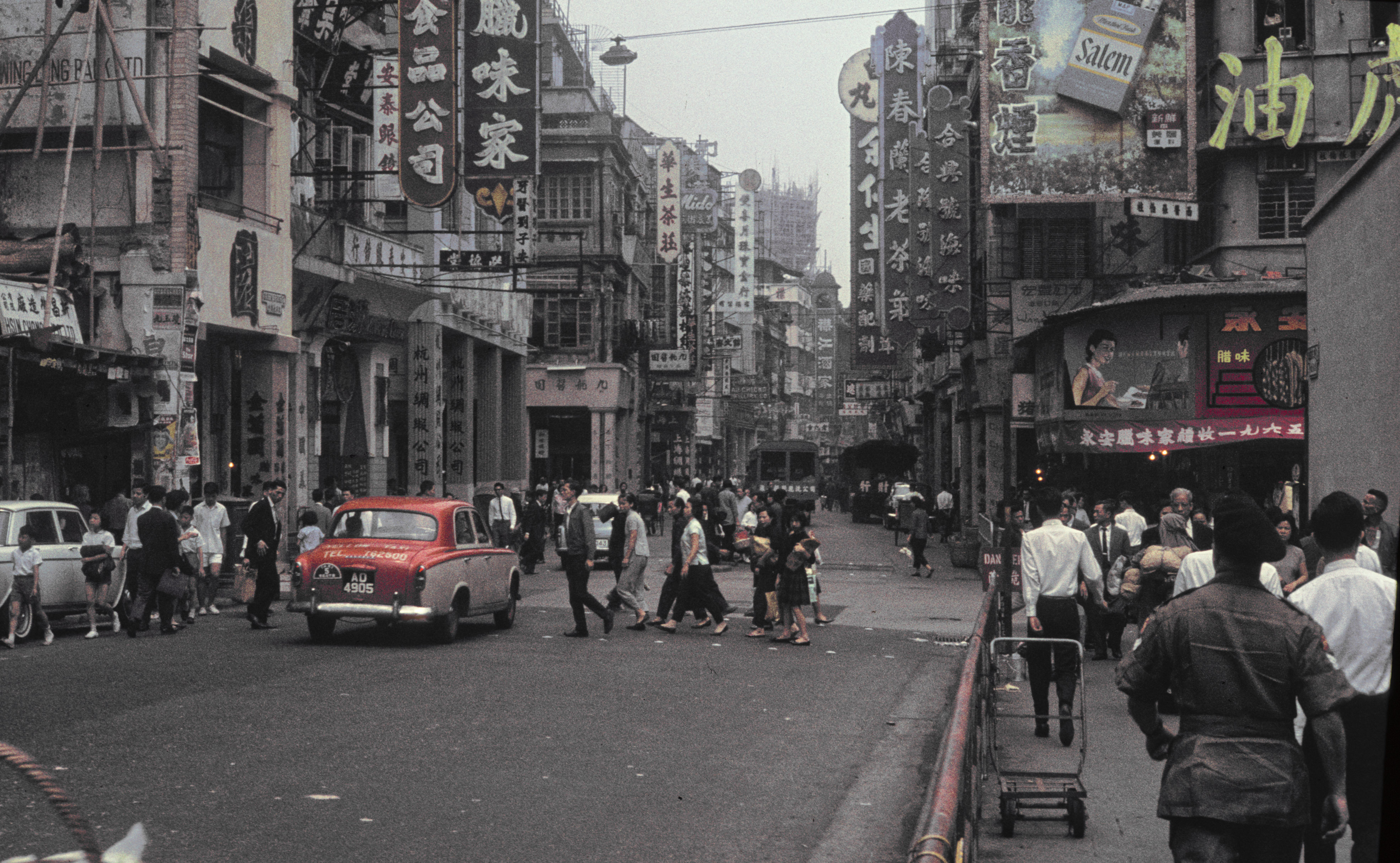
Hong Kong in 1965, shortly after Wong's family emigrated from Shanghai

Wong Kar-wai was born on 17 July 1958 in Shanghai, the youngest of three siblings. His father was a sailor and his mother a housewife. By the time Wong was five years old, the seeds of the Cultural Revolution were beginning to take effect in China, and his parents moved to Hong Kong. The two older children were meant to join them later, but the borders closed before they could and Wong did not see them again for ten years. In Hong Kong, the family settled in Tsim Sha Tsui, and his father got work managing a nightclub. As an only child in an unfamiliar city, Wong has said he felt isolated; he struggled to learn Cantonese and English, becoming fluent in these languages only as a teenager.

As a youth, Wong was frequently taken to the cinema by his mother and exposed to a variety of films. He has said, "The only hobby I had as a child was watching movies". Wong studied graphic design at the Hong Kong Polytechnic in 1980, but dropped out of college after being accepted to a training course with the TVB television network, where he learned the processes of media production.

== Career ==
=== Beginnings (1980–1989) ===
Wong soon began a screenwriting career, first on Hong Kong TV series and soap operas, such as Don't Look Now (1981), before progressing to film scripts. He worked as part of a team, contributing to various genres, including romance, comedy, thriller, and crime. Wong had little enthusiasm for these early projects, described by the film scholar Gary Bettinson as "occasionally diverting and mostly disposable", but continued to write throughout the 1980s on films including Just for Fun (1983), Rosa (1986), and The Haunted Cop Shop (1987). He is credited with ten screenplays between 1982 and 1987, but claims to have worked on about 50 more without official credit. Wong spent two years writing the screenplay for Patrick Tam's action film Final Victory (1987), for which he was nominated at the 7th Hong Kong Film Awards.

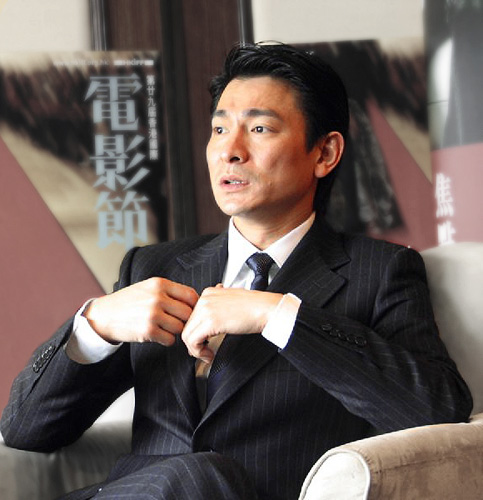
Andy Lau starred in Wong's debut, the crime film As Tears Go By (1988)

By 1987 the Hong Kong film industry was at a peak, enjoying a considerable level of prosperity and productivity. New directors were needed to maintain this success, and through his links in the industry Wong was invited to become a partner on a new independent company, In-Gear, and given the opportunity to direct his own picture. Gangster films were popular at the time, in the wake of John Woo's highly successful A Better Tomorrow (1986), and Wong decided to follow suit. Specifically, unlike Hong Kong's other crime films, he chose to focus on young gangsters. The film, As Tears Go By, tells the story of a conflicted youth who has to watch over his hot-headed friend. (Note: The plot has been compared to Martin Scorsese's Mean Streets (1971). Wong later admitted that he borrowed Robert De Niro's character from Scorsese's film, but claimed that he was mainly inspired by the experiences he had as a young man when he was friends with a low-level gangster.)

Because he was well acquainted with the producer, Alan Tang, Wong was given considerable freedom in making As Tears Go By. His cast included what he considered some of "the hottest young idols in Hong Kong": singer Andy Lau, Maggie Cheung, and Jacky Cheung. As Tears Go By was released in June 1988 and was popular with audiences. Several journalists named Wong among the "Hong Kong New Wave". While it was a conventional crime film, critic David Bordwell wrote that Wong "stands out from his peers by abandoning the kinetics of comedies and action movies in favour of more liquid atmospherics." As Tears Go By received no attention from Western critics upon its release, but was selected to be screened during the Directors' Fortnight of the 1989 Cannes Film Festival.

=== Developing style (1990–1994) ===
"I could have continued making films like As Tears Go By for the rest of eternity but I wanted to do something more personal after that. I wanted to break the structure of the average Hong Kong film."

— Wong on the transition from his first film to Days of Being Wild (1990)

In his next film, Wong moved away from the crime trend in Hong Kong cinema, to which he felt indifferent. He was eager to make something unique, and the financial success of As Tears Go By made this possible. Developing a more personal project than his previous film, Wong picked the 1960s as its setting, evoking an era he remembered well and had a "special feeling" for. Days of Being Wild focuses on a disillusioned young adult named Yuddy and those around him. There is no straightforward plot or obvious genre, but Stephen Teo sees it as a film about the "longing for love". Andy Lau, Maggie Cheung, and Jacky Cheung rejoined Wong for the film, while Leslie Cheung was cast in the central role. Hired as cinematographer was Christopher Doyle, who became one of Wong's most important collaborators, photographing his next six films.

With its popular stars, Days of Being Wild was expected to be a mainstream picture; instead it was a character piece, more concerned with mood and atmosphere than narrative. Released in December 1990, the film earned little at the box office and divided critics. It won five Hong Kong Film Awards, and received some attention internationally. With its experimental narrative, expressive camerawork, and themes of lost time and love, Days of Being Wild is described by film critic Peter Brunette as the first typical "Wong Kar-wai film". It has since gained a reputation as one of Hong Kong's finest releases. Its initial failure was disheartening for Wong, and he could not gain funding for his next project, a planned sequel.

Struggling to get support for his work, Wong formed his own production company, Jet Tone Films, with Jeff Lau in 1992. In need of further backing, Wong accepted a studio's offer that he make a wuxia (ancient martial arts) film based on the popular novel The Legend of the Condor Heroes by Jin Yong. Wong was enthusiastic about the idea, claiming he had long wanted to make a costume drama. He eventually took little from the book other than three characters, and in 1992 began experimenting with several different narrative structures to weave what he called "a very complex tapestry". Filming began with another all-star cast: Leslie, Maggie, and Jacky Cheung returned alongside Brigitte Lin, Carina Lau, Charlie Young, and Tony Leung Chiu-wai − the latter of whom became one of Wong's key collaborators.

Set during the Song dynasty, Ashes of Time concerns a desert-exiled assassin who is called upon by several different characters while nursing a broken heart. It was a difficult production and the project was not completed for two years, at a cost of HK$47 million. Upon release in September 1994, audiences were confused by the film's vague plotting and atypical take on wuxia. The film scholar Martha P. Nochimson called it "the most unusual martial arts film ever made", as fast-paced action scenes are replaced by character ruminations, and story becomes secondary to the use of colour, landscape, and imagery. Ashes of Time was a commercial failure, but critics were generally appreciative of Wong's "refusal to be loyal to [the wuxia] genre". The film won several local awards, and competed at the Venice Film Festival, where Doyle won Best Cinematography. In 2008, Wong reworked the film and rereleased it as Ashes of Time Redux. (Note: In an interview, Wong explained the reasoning and difficulties behind the restoration: "The laboratory where we stored all our negatives went bankrupt overnight following the Asian economic crisis in 1997. So on short notice we had to retrieve all the materials ... we noticed that some of the original negatives and sound tapes had deteriorated into pieces. We decided to rescue the film ... We spent the first few years searching for missing materials ... [Eventually] we realized that a 100-percent restoration of the original version was out of the question, so we trimmed out the parts that were beyond repair and replaced them with other options. From there we embarked on another five-year journey from restoration to redux".)

=== Breakthrough (1994–1995) ===
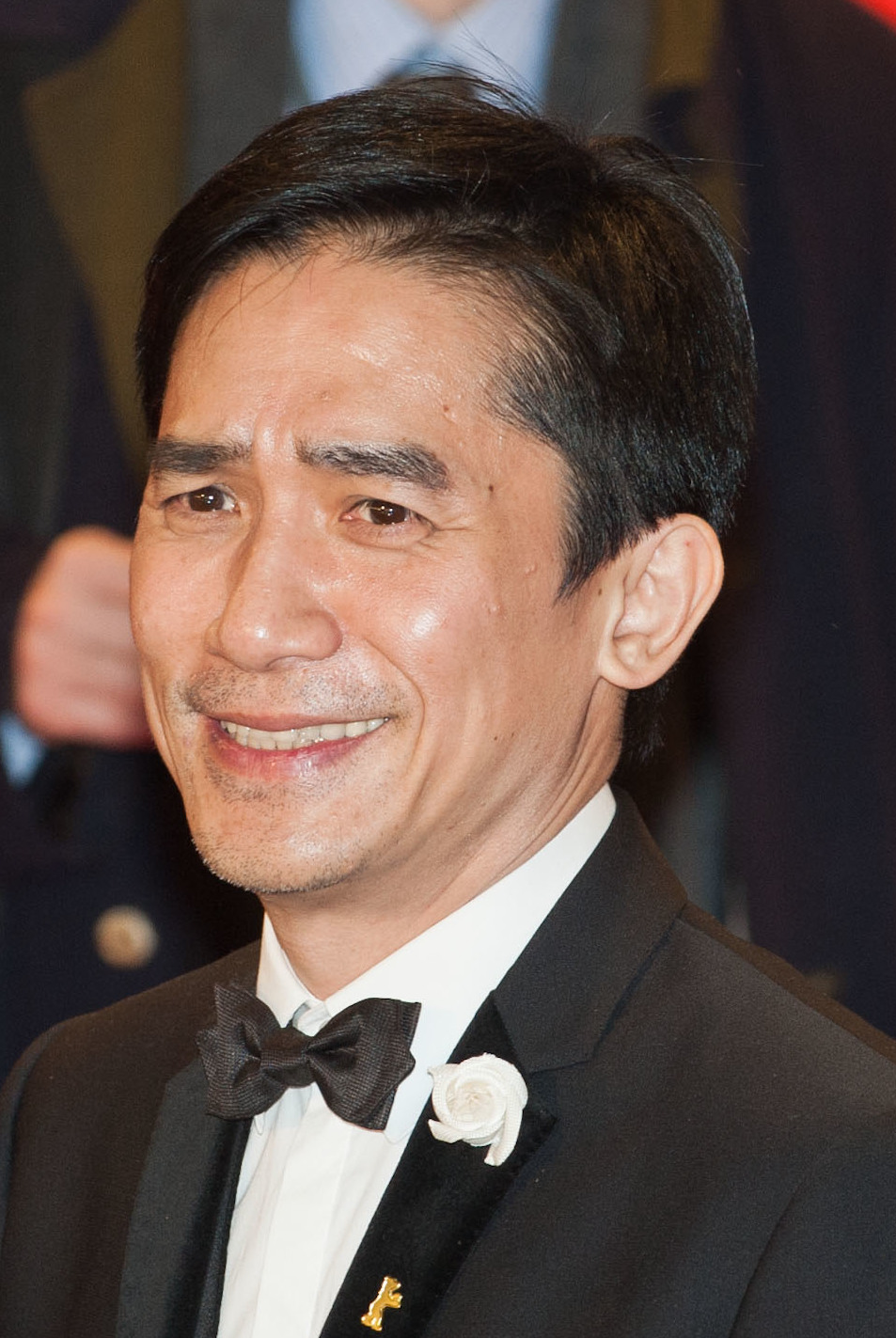
Tony Leung Chiu-wai, Wong's frequent leading man

During the production of Ashes of Time, Wong had a two-month break as he waited for equipment to re-record sound for some scenes. He was in a bad mood, feeling heavy pressure from his backers and worrying about another failure, and so he decided to start a new project: "I thought I should do something to make myself feel comfortable about making films again. So I made Chungking Express, which I made like a student film." Conceived and completed in six weeks, the new project was released two months before Ashes of Time.

Chungking Express is split into two parts, both set in contemporary Hong Kong and focusing on lonely policemen (Takeshi Kaneshiro and Tony Leung Chiu-wai) who each fall for a woman (Brigitte Lin and Faye Wong). Wong was keen to experiment with "two crisscrossing stories in one movie" and worked spontaneously, filming at night what he had written that day. Peter Brunette notes that Chungking is considerably more fun and lighthearted than Wong's earlier work but deals with the same themes. At the 1995 Hong Kong Film Awards it was named Best Picture, and Wong received Best Director. Miramax acquired the film for American distribution, which, according to Brunette, "catapulted Wong to international attention". Stephen Schneider includes it in his book 1001 Movies You Must See Before You Die with the summary: "While other films by Wong may pack more emotional resonance, Chungking Express gets off on sheer innocence, exuberance, and cinematic freedom, a striking triumph of style over substance".

"Whereas Chungking was sunshiny and suffused with bright, lovely daytime colors, Fallen Angels is more about neon, and night time, and grunge."

"Chungking Express and Fallen Angels together are the bright and dark of Hong Kong."

— Journalist Han Ong conversing with Wong

Wong continued to work without break, expanding his ideas from Chungking Express into another film about alienated young adults in contemporary Hong Kong. Chungking Express was originally conceived as three stories, but when time ran out, Wong developed the third as a new project, Fallen Angels, with new characters. He conceived both films as complementary studies of Hong Kong: "To me Chungking Express and Fallen Angels are one film that should be three hours long."

Fallen Angels is broadly considered a crime thriller, and contains scenes of extreme violence, but is atypical of the genre and heavily infused with Wong's fragmented, experimental style. The loose plot again involves two distinct, subtly overlapping narratives, and is dominated by frantic visuals. The film mostly occurs at night and explores Hong Kong's dark side, which Wong planned to balance the sweetness of Chungking: "It's fair to show both sides of a coin". Kaneshiro and Young were cast again, but new to Wong's films were Leon Lai, Michelle Reis, and Karen Mok. Upon its release in September 1995, several critics felt that the film was too similar to Chungking Express and some complained that Wong had become self-indulgent. But as time went on, critics reappraised the film, and it has amassed a large cult following, becoming one of Wong's most popular films. Fallen Angels has often been said to be one of Wong's most stylish films, and been praised for its unconventional, fragmented plot. Film historians Zhang Yingjin and Xiao Zhiwei wrote: "While not as groundbreaking as its predecessors, the film is still different and innovative enough to confirm [Wong's] presence on the international scene."

=== Widespread recognition (1996–2000) ===
While his reputation grew steadily throughout the early 1990s, Wong's international standing was "thoroughly consolidated" with the 1997 romantic drama Happy Together (1997). Its development was influenced by the handover of Hong Kong from Britain to China that year. Wong was widely expected to address the event in his next film; instead, he avoided the pressure by shooting in Argentina. The handover was nevertheless important: knowing that homosexuals in Hong Kong faced uncertainty after 1997, Wong focused on a relationship between two men. (Note: Lisa Stokes and Michael Hoover believe Happy Together is even more strongly linked to the Handover, as they argue that the relationship of the main characters represents that of China and Hong Kong. Jeffrey Tambling agrees this is a viable interpretation. Wong has denied this, but admits that the title is a reference to his hope that "we could all be happy together after 1997".) He was keen to present the relationship as ordinary and universal, as he felt Hong Kong's previous LGBT films had not.

Happy Together tells the story of a couple (Tony Leung Chiu-wai and Leslie Cheung) who travel to Buenos Aires in an effort to save their relationship. Its structure and style differ from Wong's previous films, as he felt he had become predictable. Teo, Brunette, and Jeremy Tambling all see Happy Together as a marked change from his earlier work: the story is more linear and understandable, there are only three characters (all men), and while it still has Doyle's "exuberant" photography, it is more stylistically restrained. After a difficult production period where a six-week shoot was dragged out to four months, the film was released in May 1997 to critical acclaim. It competed for the Palme d'Or at the Cannes Film Festival, where Wong became Hong Kong's first winner of the Best Director Award (an achievement he downplayed: "it makes no difference, it's just something you can put on an ad.")

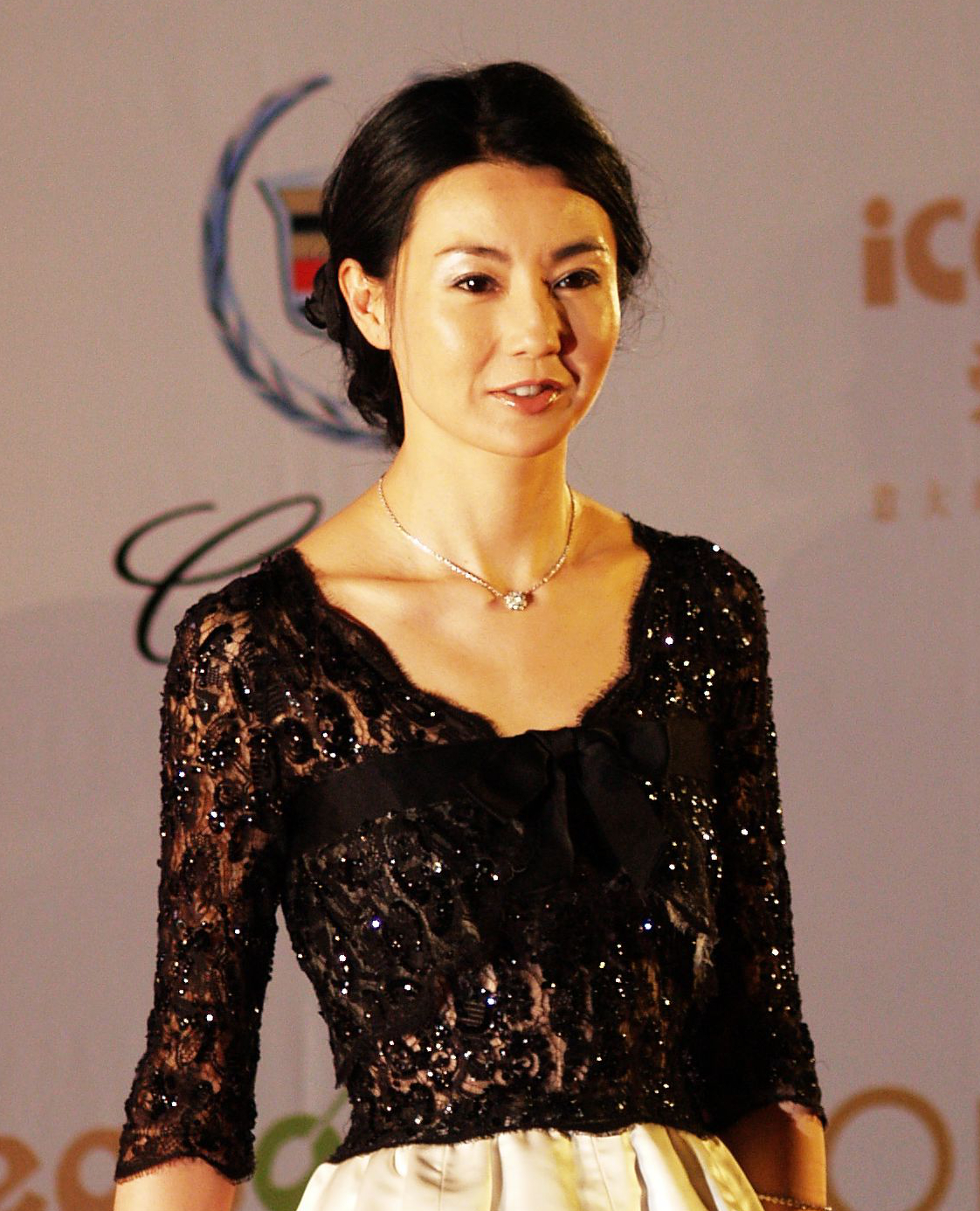
Maggie Cheung, star of In the Mood for Love and three other Wong films

In his 2005 monograph, Brunette wrote that Happy Together marked "a new stage in [Wong's] artistic development", and along with its successor, In the Mood for Love (2000), showcases Wong at "the zenith of his cinematic art." The latter film emerged from a complicated two-year production history. Several different titles and projects were planned by Wong before they evolved into the final result: a romantic melodrama set in 1960s Hong Kong that is seen as an unofficial sequel to Days of Being Wild. (Note: In the Mood for Love is set two years after Days of Being Wild, and in both films Maggie Cheung's character is named Su Li-zhen.) Wong returned to the era that fascinated him, and reflected his own background by focusing on Shanghainese émigrés.

Maggie Cheung and Tony Leung Chiu-wai play the lead characters, who move into an apartment building on the same day in 1962 and discover that their spouses are having an affair; over the next four years they develop a strong attraction. Teo writes that the film is a study of "typical Chinese reserve and repressed desire", while Schneider writes that the "strange relationship" is choreographed with "the grace and rhythm of a waltz" and depicted in "a dreamlike haze by an eavesdropping camera".

The shoot lasted 15 months, with both Cheung and Leung reportedly driven to their breaking points. Wong shot more than 30 times the footage he eventually used, and finished editing the film the morning before its Cannes premiere. At the festival, In the Mood for Love received the Technical Grand Prize and Best Actor for Leung. It was named Best Foreign Film by the National Society of Film Critics. Wong said after its release: "In the Mood for Love is the most difficult film in my career so far, and one of the most important. I am very proud of it." It has been included on lists of the greatest films of all time.

=== International work (2001–2007) ===
While In the Mood for Love took two years to complete, its sequel – 2046 – took double that time. 2046 was actually conceived first, when Wong picked the title as a reference to the final year of China's "One country, two systems" promise to Hong Kong. (Note: The Chinese government stated in 1997 that for 50 years Hong Kong was guaranteed to stay the same and keep its capitalist economy. Wong said: "2046 is the last year of this promise and I thought it would be interesting to use these numbers to make a film about promises.") Although his plans changed and a new film developed, he simultaneously shot material for 2046, with the first footage dating to December 1999. Wong immediately continued with the project once In the Mood for Love was complete, reportedly becoming obsessed with it. In Bettinson's account, it "became a behemoth, impossible to finish".

2046 continues the story of Chow Mo-wan, Leung's character from In the Mood for Love, though he is considered much colder and very different. Wong found he did not want to leave the character, and commenced where he left off in 1966; nevertheless, he said: "It's another story, about how a man faces his future due to a certain past". His plans were vague and, according to Teo, he set "a new record in his own method of free-thinking, time-extensive and improvisatory filmmaking" with the production. Scenes were shot in Beijing, Shanghai, Hong Kong, Macau, and Bangkok. Zhang Ziyi and Gong Li play the women who consume Mo-wan, as he plans a science fiction novel titled 2046. The film premiered at the 2004 Cannes Film Festival, but Wong delivered the print 24 hours late and still was not happy: he continued editing until the film's October release. It was Wong's most expensive and longest-running project to date. 2046 was a commercial failure in Hong Kong, but most Western critics gave it positive reviews. Ty Burr of The Boston Globe called it an "enigmatic, rapturously beautiful meditation on romance and remembrance", while Steve Erikson of Los Angeles Magazine called it Wong's masterpiece.

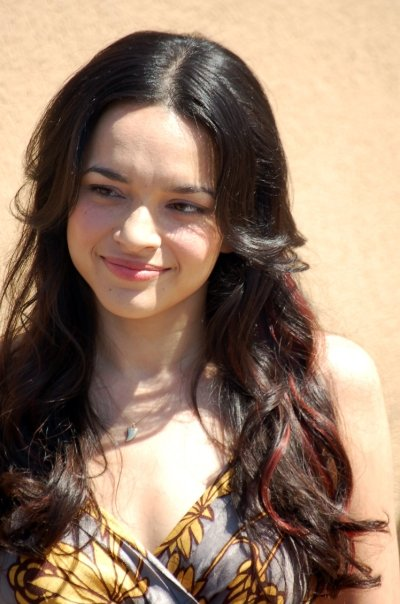
Singer Norah Jones starred in Wong's English-language film, My Blueberry Nights (2007)

Before starting his next feature, Wong worked on the anthology film Eros (2004), providing one of three short films (the others are by Michelangelo Antonioni and Steven Soderbergh) that centre on the theme of lust. Wong's segment, The Hand, stars Gong Li as a 1960s call girl and Chang Chen as her potential client. Although Eros was not well received, Wong's segment was often called the most successful.

Following the difficult production of 2046, Wong wanted his next feature to be a simple, invigorating experience. He decided to make an English-language film in America, later saying: "It's a new landscape. It's a new background, so it's refreshing." After hearing a radio interview with the singer Norah Jones he immediately decided to contact her, and she signed on as the lead. (Note: Jones had never acted before, but Wong had a history of casting singers in his films and said it felt "very natural". He also liked "the idea of this being her first movie and my first movie in English, which made us equals." Wong insisted that she not take acting lessons.) Wong's understanding of America was based only on short visits and what he had seen in films, but he was keen to depict the country accurately, so he co-wrote the film (one of the rare times a screenplay was pre-prepared) with Lawrence Block. Titled My Blueberry Nights, it focuses on a young New Yorker who takes a road trip when she learns that her boyfriend has been unfaithful. Cast as the figures she meets are Jude Law, Natalie Portman, Rachel Weisz, and David Strathairn.

Filming on My Blueberry Nights took place over seven weeks in 2006, on location in Manhattan, Memphis, Las Vegas, and Ely, Nevada. Wong produced it in the same manner as he would in Hong Kong, and the themes and visual style–despite Doyle being replaced by cinematographer Darius Khondji–remain the same. Premiering in May 2007, My Blueberry Nights was Wong's fourth consecutive film to compete for the Palme d'Or at Cannes. Although he considered it a "special experience", the film did not get good reviews. With complaints that its material was thin and the product uneven, My Blueberry Nights was Wong's first critical failure.

=== 2008–present ===
Wong's next film was not released for five years, as he underwent another long and difficult production on The Grandmaster (2013), a biographical film of the martial arts teacher Ip Man. The idea had occurred to him in 1999, but he did not commit to it until completing My Blueberry Nights. Ip is a legendary figure in Hong Kong, known for training actor Bruce Lee in the art of Wing Chun, but Wong focuses on an earlier period of Ip's life (1936–1956) that included the turmoil of the Second Sino-Japanese War and World War II. (Note: Wong began the project when there had not been any other Ip Man biopics, but in the time it took him to make The Grandmaster three others were released first: Ip Man (2008), Ip Man 2 (2010), and The Legend Is Born: Ip Man (2010).) He set out to make "a commercial and colourful film". After considerable research and preparation, filming began in 2009. Tony Leung Chui-wai rejoined Wong for their seventh film together, having spent 18 months being trained in Wing Chun. The "gruelling" production lasted intermittently for three years, twice interrupted by Leung fracturing his arm, and is Wong's most expensive to date.

The Grandmaster is described by Bettinson as a mixture of popular and arthouse traditions, with form, visuals, and themes consistent with Wong's previous work. Three different versions of the film exist, as Wong shorted it from its domestic release for the 2013 Berlin Film Festival, and again for its US distribution by The Weinstein Company. (Note: Wong has said that he was obliged to keep the film under two hours for the US release, but "I didn't want to do it just by cutting the film shorter ... I just wanted to tell the story in a different way." He restructured the material, making it more linear and focussing more on the character of Ip Man, and included new scenes not seen in the Chinese version. Some critics have argued that the US version is inferior.) Described in Slant Magazine as Wong's most accessible film since his debut, The Grandmaster won 12 Hong Kong Film Awards, including Best Film and Best Director, and received two Academy Award nominations (Cinematography and Production Design). Critics approved of the film, and with a worldwide gross of US$64 million it is Wong's most lucrative film to date.

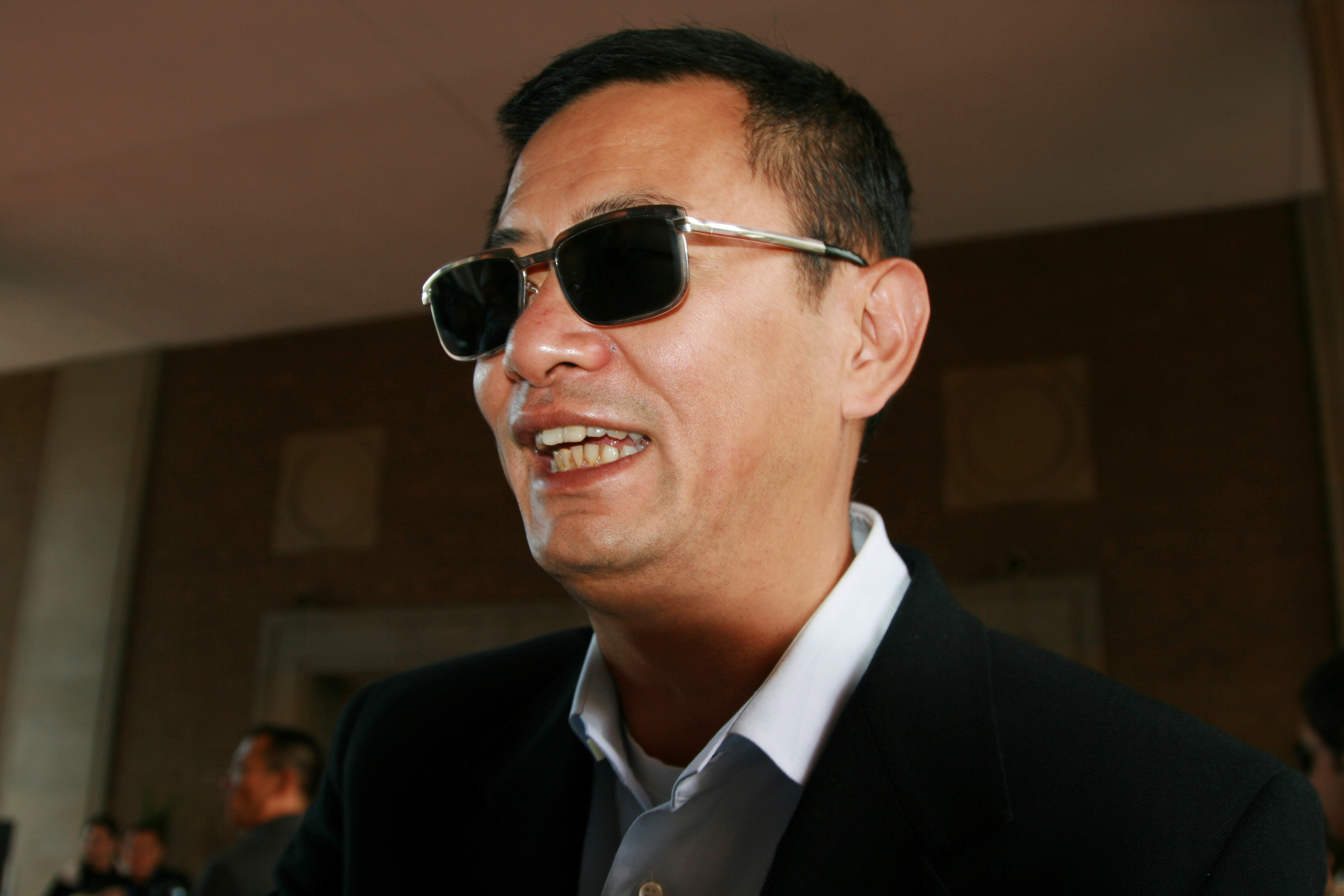
Wong at the 2008 Toronto International Film Festival

When asked about his career in 2014, Wong told The Independent, "To be honest with you, I feel I'm only halfway done." In 2016, he was announced as taking over an upcoming film about the murder of Maurizio Gucci from Ridley Scott, but in October 2017 he said he was no longer involved in the project. In September 2017, Amazon Video issued a straight-to-series order for Tong Wars, a television drama to be directed by Wong and focusing on the gang wars of 19th-century San Francisco. Amazon later dropped the series.

In 2019, Wong announced the 4K restoration of his entire filmography, which was released in 2021 in celebration of the 20th anniversary of In the Mood for Love. The restoration was carried out by the Cineteca di Bologna's film restoration laboratory L'Immagine Ritrovata. The Criterion Collection released Wong's restored filmography as a box set in the United States in March 2021. On 27 December 2023, Wong's first TV series, Blossoms Shanghai, based on Jin Yucheng's book of the same name, aired on CCTV-8 and Tencent Video. The series follows a businessman, A Bao (Hu Ge), through changing times in Shanghai.

== Personal life ==
In 1981, Wong met TVB program producer Esther Chen at a bar. At her suggestion, he applied for TVB's director training program. Wong's first film script, Once Upon a Rainbow, was purchased by director Agnes Ng through Chen's introduction. Chen also sold his subsequent scripts, Final Victory and Haunted Cop Shop. In 1985, Wong married Chen in Hong Kong, after which she became his producer and production partner. In 1997, Chen gave birth to their son in Hong Kong. In October 2017, while accepting the Lumière Award for lifetime achievement at the Lumière Festival in Lyon, France, Wong called his wife his muse, saying: "Of all the great female characters I have created in my films, there are always glimpses of her there. That is the reason why her name is always the first to appear onscreen in all of my films."

In 2009, Wong signed a petition in support of director Roman Polanski after his arrest in relation to his 1977 sexual abuse charges while traveling to a film festival, which the petition argued would undermine the tradition of film festivals as a place for works to be shown "freely and safely" and could open the door "for actions of which no-one can know the effects."

== Filmmaking ==
=== Influences ===
"[Wong has] a heady mix of influences, ranging from modernist novels to narrative, visual and aural motifs drawn from local films and popular culture. High and low, new and old, and local and global are all thrown onto a blank canvas, one that assumes shape ... [only during the] editing process."

— Giorgio Biancorosso, in Hong Kong Culture: Word and Image

Wong is wary of sharing his favourite directors, but has said he watched a range of films growing up, from Hong Kong genre films to European art films. They were never labelled as such, and so he approached them equally and was broadly influenced. The energy of the Hong Kong films had a "tremendous" impact, according to Brunette. Art professor Giorgio Biancorosso writes that Wong's international influences include Martin Scorsese, Michelangelo Antonioni, Alfred Hitchcock, and Bernardo Bertolucci. Some of his favorite contemporary filmmakers include Scorsese, Christopher Nolan, and Quentin Tarantino. He is often compared with French New Wave director Jean-Luc Godard. Wong's most direct influence was his colleague Patrick Tam, who was an important mentor and likely inspired his use of colour.

Wong is also heavily influenced by literature. He has a particular affinity for Latin American writers, and the fragmentary nature of his films came primarily from the "scrapbook structures" of novels by Manuel Puig, Gabriel García Márquez, and Julio Cortázar, which he attempted to emulate. Haruki Murakami, particularly his novel Norwegian Wood, also provided inspiration, as did the writing of Liu Yichang. The television channel MTV was a further influence on Wong. He said in a 1998 interview: "In the late eighties, when [MTV] was first shown in Hong Kong, we were all really impressed with the energy and the fragmented structure. It seemed like we should go in this direction."

=== Method and collaborators ===
Wong has an unusual approach to filmmaking, starting production without a script and generally relying on instinct and improvisation rather than prepared ideas. He has said he dislikes writing and finds filming from a finished script "boring". According to Stokes & Hoover, he writes as he shoots, "drawing inspiration from the music, the setting, working conditions, and actors". In advance, the cast are given a minimal plot outline and expected to develop their characters as they film. To capture naturalness and spontaneity, Wong does not allow rehearsals, but improvisation and collaboration are encouraged. He does not use storyboards or plan camera placement, preferring to experiment as he goes. His shooting ratio is therefore very high, sometimes 40 takes per scene, and production typically goes well over schedule and over budget. Tony Leung has called this approach "taxing on the actors", but Stokes & Hoover speculate that Wong's collaborators endure it because the "results are always unexpected, invigorating, and interesting."

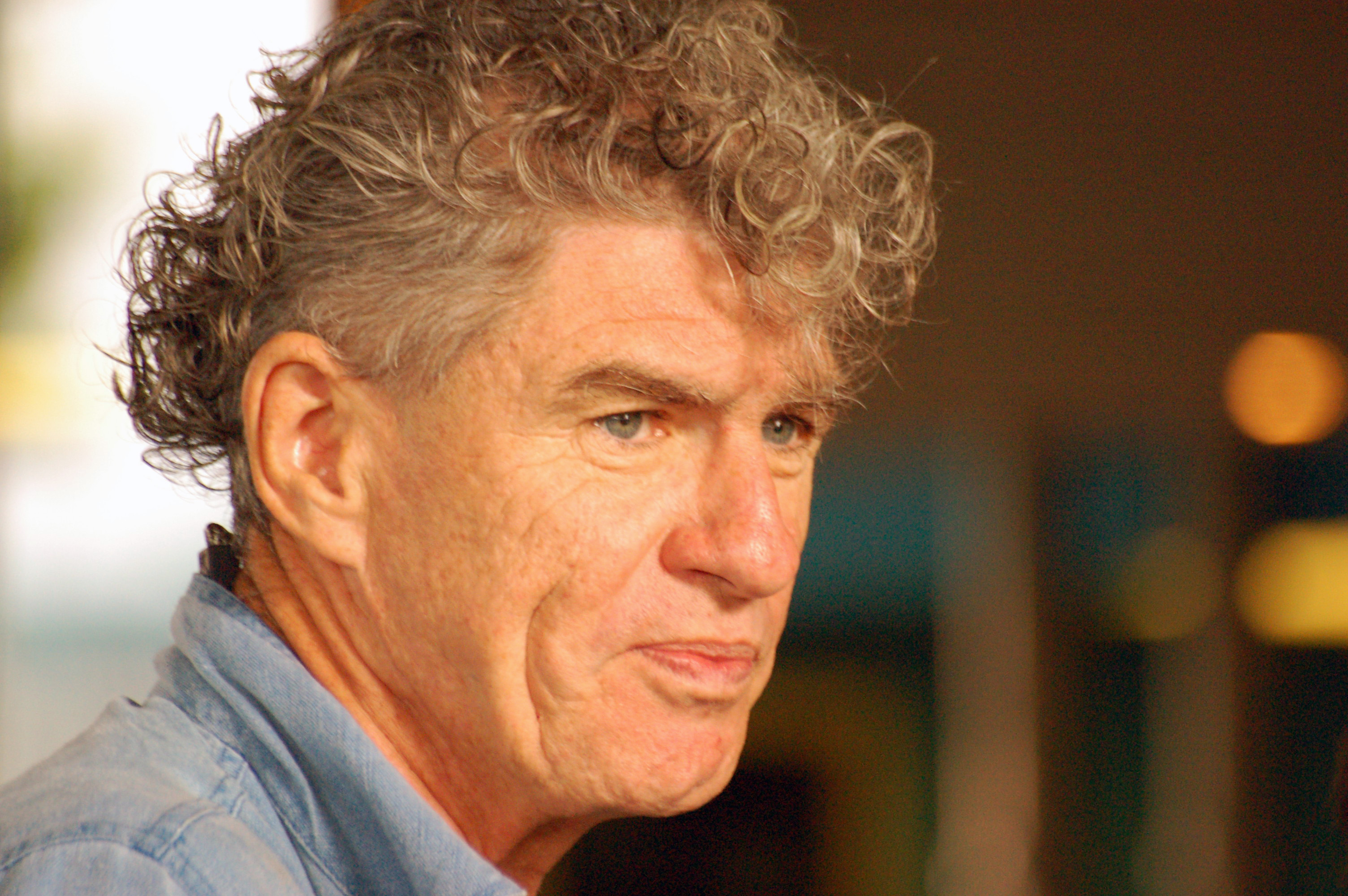
Cinematographer Christopher Doyle, Wong's "defining collaborator"

Wong admits to being controlling, and oversees every aspect of the filmmaking process, but he has formed several long-lasting partnerships and close collaborators. In 2013, he said: "It is always good to work with a very regular group of people because we know how high we can fly and what are the parameters, and it becomes very enjoyable." Two men have been instrumental in developing and achieving his aesthetic: production designer William Chang and cinematographer Christopher Doyle. Chang has worked on every Wong film and is a trusted confidant, responsible for set design and costumes. Doyle photographed seven of his projects, from Days of Being Wild to 2046. Stephen Schneider writes that he deserves "much credit" for Wong's success, as his "masterful use of light and colour renders every frame a work of art". Wong's other regular colleagues include writer-producer Jeffrey Lau, producer Jacky Pang, and assistant director Johnnie Kong.

Wong often casts the same actors. He is strongly associated with Tony Leung Chiu-wai, who has appeared in seven of Wong's feature films. Wong has called him a partner, saying, "I feel like there is a lot of things between me and Tony that is beyond words. We don't need meetings, talks, whatever, because a lot of things are understood." Other actors who have appeared in at least three of his films are Maggie Cheung, Chang Chen, Leslie Cheung, Jacky Cheung, and Carina Lau.

=== Style ===
Wong is known for producing art films focused on mood and atmosphere, rather than following convention. His general style is described by Teo as "a cornucopia overflowing with multiple stories, strands of expression, meanings and identities: a kaleidoscope of colours and identities". Structurally, Wong's films are typically fragmented and disjointed, with little concern for linear narrative, and often with interconnected stories. Critics have commented on his films' lack of plot. Burr writes: "The director doesn't build linear story lines so much as concentric rings of narrative and poetic meaning that continually revolve around each other". Similarly, Brunette says that Wong "often privileges audio/visual expressivity over narrative structure". Wong has said, "in my logic there is a storyline."

Screenshot from In the Mood for Love (2000), showing Wong's use of vivid colour and step-printing

Key to Wong's films is the visual style, which is often described as beautiful and unique. The colours are bold and saturated, the camerawork swooning, resulting in what Brunette calls his "signature visual pyrotechnics". One of his trademarks is the use of step-printing, which alters film rates to liquefy "hard blocks of primary colour into iridescent streaks of light." Other features of Wong's aesthetic include slow motion, off-centre framing, obscured faces, rack focus, filming in the dark or rain, and elliptical editing. Schneider writes of Wong's fondness for "playing with film stock, exposure, and speed the way others might fiddle with a script."

Another trademark of Wong's cinema is his use of music and pop songs. He places great importance on this, and Biancorosso calls it the "essence" of his films, a key part of the "narrative machinery" that can guide the rhythm of the editing. He selects international songs, rarely cantopop, and uses them to enhance the sense of history or place. According to film scholar Julian Stringer, music is "crucial to the emotional and cognitive appeal" of Wong's films.

Wong's dependence on music and heavily visual and disjointed style have been compared to music videos, but detractors say they are "all surface and no depth". Academic Curtis K. Tsui argues that style is the substance in Wong's film, while Brunette believes that his "form remains resolutely in the service of character, theme, and emotion rather than indulged in for its own sake".

== Controversy ==
Wong has developed a reputation for an unstructured and unscripted approach to filmmaking, demanding and arbitrary in his direction of actors, budget and schedule overruns, and alleged underpayment and on-set bullying of cast and crew. His working methods and professional ethics have strained his relationships with some actors, producers, and collaborators.

Wong has said he developed notoriety for his treatment of actors since Days of Being Wild. He often gives abstract, confusing, or changeable instructions, and makes his actors repeat the same scene endlessly until emotional breakdown. Among those who have spoken publicly about their difficult experiences with him are Carina Lau, Tony Leung, Chang Chen, and Takuya Kimura. Jacky Cheung, who first became friends with Wong when Cheung worked as a screenwriter on The Haunted Cop Shop, was alienated by Wong's direction of Days of Being Wild and stopped working with him after Ashes of Time.

Leslie Cheung refused to work with Wong again after shooting Happy Together in Argentina, during which Wong's long delays jeopardized Cheung's Crossing '97 concert in Hong Kong. Cinematographer Christopher Doyle recalled that Cheung, frustrated by Wong's disregard for others' time, lost his temper and left the set despite Wong's ban, returning only after his concert. Tony Leung Ka-fai criticized Wong for using Cheung to pressure his blindsided friend Tony Leung Chiu-wai, who was stranded in Argentina after being misled by Wong's initial fake script but was reserved about the gay story line, into taking the part. Shu Kei said Happy Together exploited Cheung's sexuality before he came out.

Wong's revisions to his films have often drawn criticism from collaborators for being obsessive or arbitrary. In addition to actors whose roles were significantly reduced without notice, those who completed filming but were entirely removed from his final cuts include Joey Wong in Ashes of Time, Shirley Kwan in Happy Together, Paulyn Sun in In the Mood for Love, Dong Jie in 2046, and Jin Jing in Blossoms Shanghai. Among films that were abandoned, sometimes due to funding breakdown or cast withdrawals caused by his delays, are Wong Gok For Chak Chi Yan (旺角火宅之人), starring Brigitte Lin, Faye Wong, and Sean Lau; The Buenos Aires Affair, adapted from the novel by Manuel Puig; Summer in Beijing, starring Tony Leung Chiu-wai; and The Lady from Shanghai, starring Nicole Kidman. Wong also abandoned the first cut of Ashes of Time edited by his mentor Patrick Tam, turning instead to William Chang for a new version, leaving Tam frustrated by the wasted effort and vowing never to work with Wong again.

== Legacy ==
Wong is an important figure in contemporary cinema, regarded as one of the best filmmakers of his generation. His reputation as a maverick began early in his career: in the 1996 Encyclopedia of Chinese Film, Wong was described as having "already established a secure reputation as one of the most daring avant-garde filmmakers" of Chinese cinema. Authors Zhang and Xiao concluded that he "occupies a special place in contemporary film history", and had already "exerted a sizeable impact". With the subsequent release of Happy Together and In the Mood for Love, Wong's international standing grew, and in 2002 voters for the British Film Institute named him the third-greatest director of the previous quarter-century. In 2015, Variety named him an icon of arthouse cinema.

The East Asian scholar Daniel Martin describes Wong's output as "among the most internationally accessible and critically acclaimed Hong Kong films of all time". Because of this status abroad, Wong is seen as a pivotal figure in his local industry; Julian Stringer says he is "central to the contemporary Chinese cinema renaissance", Gary Bettinson describes him as "a beacon of Hong Kong cinema" who "has kept that industry in the public spotlight", and Film4 designate him the filmmaker from China with the greatest impact. Together with Zhang Yimou, Wong is seen by the historian Philip Kemp as representing the "internationalisation" of East Asian cinema. Domestically, his films were generally not financial successes, but he has been consistently well-awarded by local bodies. From early on, he was regarded as Hong Kong's enfant terrible and one of its most iconoclastic filmmakers. Despite this, he has been recognised in both cult and mainstream circles, producing art films that receive commercial exposure. He is known for confounding audiences, as he adopts established genres and subverts them with experimental techniques.

"Wong stands as the leading heir to the great directors of post-WWII Europe: His work combines the playfulness and disenchantment of Godard, the visual fantasias of Fellini, the chic existentialism of Antonioni, and Bergman's brooding uncertainties."

— Ty Burr of The Boston Globe

Both Stringer and Nochimson claim that Wong has one of the most distinctive filmmaking styles in the industry. From his first film As Tears Go By, he made an impact with his "liquid" aesthetic, which Ungerböck claims was completely new and quickly copied in Asian film and television. Brunette calls Days of Being Wild "a landmark in Hong Kong cinema" for its unconventional approach. Nochimson writes that Wong's films are entirely personal, making him an auteur, adding, "Wong has developed his own cinematic vocabulary, with an array of shot patterns connected with him". Stringer argues that Wong's success demonstrates the importance of being "different".

Wong's films frequently appeared on best-of lists domestically and internationally. On the Hong Kong Film Awards Association's 2005 list of The Best 100 Chinese Motion Pictures, all but one of his films up to that time made the list. Days of Being Wild (1990) placed third, the highest position for a post-1980s film; other films ranked were Chungking Express (22), Ashes of Time (35), As Tears Go By (88), Happy Together (89), and In the Mood for Love (90). In the 2012 Sight and Sound poll, whereby industry professionals submit ballots to determine the greatest films of all time, In the Mood for Love ranked 24th, the highest-ranked film since 1980 and the sixth-greatest film by a living director. Chungking Express and Days of Being Wild both ranked in the top 250; Happy Together and 2046 in the top 500; and Ashes of Time and As Tears Go By also featured (all but two of Wong's films at the time).

Wong's influence has impacted contemporary directors including Quentin Tarantino, Sofia Coppola, Lee Myung-se, Alejandro González Iñárritu, Tom Tykwer, The Daniels, Zhang Yuan, Tsui Hark, and Barry Jenkins. In 2018, he was awarded an Honorary Doctor of Arts degree by Harvard University.

== Filmography and awards ==
Wong's oeuvre consists of ten directed features, 16 films where is he credited only as screenwriter, one television series and seven films by other directors that he produced. He has also directed commercials, short films, and music videos, and contributed to two anthology films. He has received awards and nominations from organisations in Asia, Europe, North America, and South America. In 2006, Wong accepted the National Order of the Legion of Honour: Knight (Lowest Degree) from the French government. In 2013, he was bestowed with the title of a Commander of the Ordre des Arts et des Lettres, the highest order, by French Foreign Minister Laurent Fabius. The International Film Festival of India gave Wong a Lifetime Achievement Award in 2014.

Directed features
Year	Title	Chinese title
1988	As Tears Go By	旺角卡門 Wong gok ka moon
1990	Days of Being Wild	阿飛正傳 Ah fei zing zyun
1994	Chungking Express	重慶森林 Chung Hing sam lam
1994	Ashes of Time	東邪西毒 Dung che sai duk
1995	Fallen Angels	墮落天使 Do lok tin si
1997	Happy Together	春光乍洩 Chun gwong cha sit
2000	In the Mood for Love	花樣年華 Fa yeung nin wa
2004	2046	—
2007	My Blueberry Nights	—
2013	The Grandmaster	一代宗師 Yi dai zong shi

Directed television series
Year	Title	Chinese title
2023–2024	Blossoms Shanghai	繁花

Acted features
Year	Title	Chinese title
1984	The Other Side of Gentleman	君子好逑
1984	Silent Romance	伊人再見
1988	The Haunted Cop Shop II	猛鬼學堂
1988	Chaos By Design	愛情謎語
2016	The First Monday in May	—
