= 2046 (film) =

2004 film by Wong Kar-wai

- Theatrical release poster
- Directed by: Wong Kar-wai
- Screenplay by: Wong Kar-wai
- Produced by: Wong Kar-wai
- Starring: Tony Leung Chiu-wai; Gong Li; Faye Wong; Takuya Kimura; Zhang Ziyi; Carina Lau; Chang Chen; Thongchai McIntyre; Dong Jie; Maggie Cheung
- Cinematography: Christopher Doyle; Kwan Pun Leung; Lai Yiu-fai
- Edited by: William Chang
- Music by: Peer Raben; Shigeru Umebayashi
- Production companies: Jet Tone Productions; Block 2 Pictures; Paradis Films; Orly Films; Classic SRL; Shanghai Film Corporation; Arte France Cinéma; France 3 Cinéma; ZDF-Arte
- Distributed by: Mei Ah Entertainment; 20th Century Fox (Hong Kong); Océan Films (France); Istituto Luce (Italy); Prokino Filmverleih (Germany)
- Release dates: 20 May 2004 (Cannes); 29 September 2004 (Hong Kong); 20 October 2004 (France); 29 October 2004 (Italy); 13 January 2005 (Germany)
- Running time: 129 minutes
- Countries: Hong Kong; France; Italy; China; Germany
- Languages: Cantonese; Japanese; Mandarin
- Budget: US$12 million
- Box office: US$19.5 million

2046 is a 2004 romantic drama film written, produced and directed by Wong Kar-wai. An international co-production between Hong Kong, France, Italy, China and Germany, it is a loose sequel to Wong's films Days of Being Wild (1990) and In the Mood for Love (2000). It follows the aftermath of Chow Mo-wan's unconsummated affair with Su Li-zhen in 1960s Hong Kong.

== Plot ==
There are four main story arcs, listed in approximate order below. In typical Wong fashion, they are presented in non-chronological order. Knowledge of Days of Being Wild and In the Mood for Love is assumed, but not necessary to understand 2046.

=== 2046 Part I ===
Returning to Hong Kong after years in Singapore, Chow has become a suave ladies' man to cover up his pain from losing Su. Chow meets Lulu, taking her home but accidentally keeps her room key. Upon returning the key, Chow later learns that Lulu was stabbed the night before by a jealous boyfriend.

=== Wang Jing-wen and Wang Jie-wen Part I ===
The landlord's daughter Jing-wen is seeing a Japanese man her father strongly disapproves of. Eventually, Jing-wen breaks up with him. The next tenant is Jing-wen's younger sister Jie-wen who attempts and fails to seduce Chow. Soon after, Chow runs into financial difficulties so he starts writing sci-fi stories where people from his life appear from time to time. Scenes from the stories are interwoven with the plot arcs.

=== Bai Ling Part I ===
Bai Ling is a nightclub ballroom dancer seeking a long-term relationship. Bai runs into Chow after her boyfriend leaves her before a planned trip to Singapore and they become friends. The relationship quickly turns sexual. Chow wants to keep the relationship purely physical, continuing to see other women; when Bai realizes she has feelings for Chow and asks for exclusivity, Chow refuses and they break up. Bai then returns to prostitution.

=== Jing-wen Part II ===
After Bai leaves, Jing-wen is released from institutional care and still depressed over her previous relationship. Chow develops feelings for Jing-wen and attempts a relationship but nothing develops as she is still in love with her previous lover.

=== Jing-wen Part III ===
Jing-wen gets engaged. Depressed over the loss of Jing-wen, Chow runs into Bai Ling and believes she is likely to remain content with her misery. He resolves to get over Su.

=== Bai Part II ===
Some time later, Bai calls Chow and they go out to dinner. She informs Chow of her plans to leave for Singapore, asking for a reference.

=== Su Arc ===
Chow met Su (different from Su Li-Zhen of the previous movie) after arriving in Singapore, financially spent from gambling. Su agrees to help him win money so he can return to Hong Kong and they become lovers. When he asks Su to return to Hong Kong with him, Su challenges him to a final draw that Chow loses, and so she refuses to go with him and also refuses to tell him why.

When Chow returns to Singapore to visit her a second time, he does not find her and hears rumors that Su either returned to Cambodia or was killed.

=== Bai Part III ===
The night before Bai leaves for Singapore, Chow dines with her again. She insists on paying for dinner and hands him a stack of cash, each $10 bill representing a night they spent together. After dinner, Chow walks her back to her apartment and Bai begs him to spend the night. He cannot, and leaves by taxi.

== Cast ==
- Tony Leung as Chow Mo-wan, a journalist and writer, who is the film's main character and narrator. Leung reprises his role from Days of Being Wild and In the Mood for Love.
- Maggie Cheung as Su Li-zhen, the woman Chow Mo-wan loved most, and had an emotional affair with in 1962. Cheung reprises her role from Days of Being Wild and In the Mood for Love.
- Gong Li as a second Su Li-zhen. Presented as a "professional gambler" and nicknamed "Black Spider", she says she's from Phnom Penh. Chow Mo-wan met her in Singapore.
- Wang Sum as Mr. Wang, a tenor singer from Harbin, China.

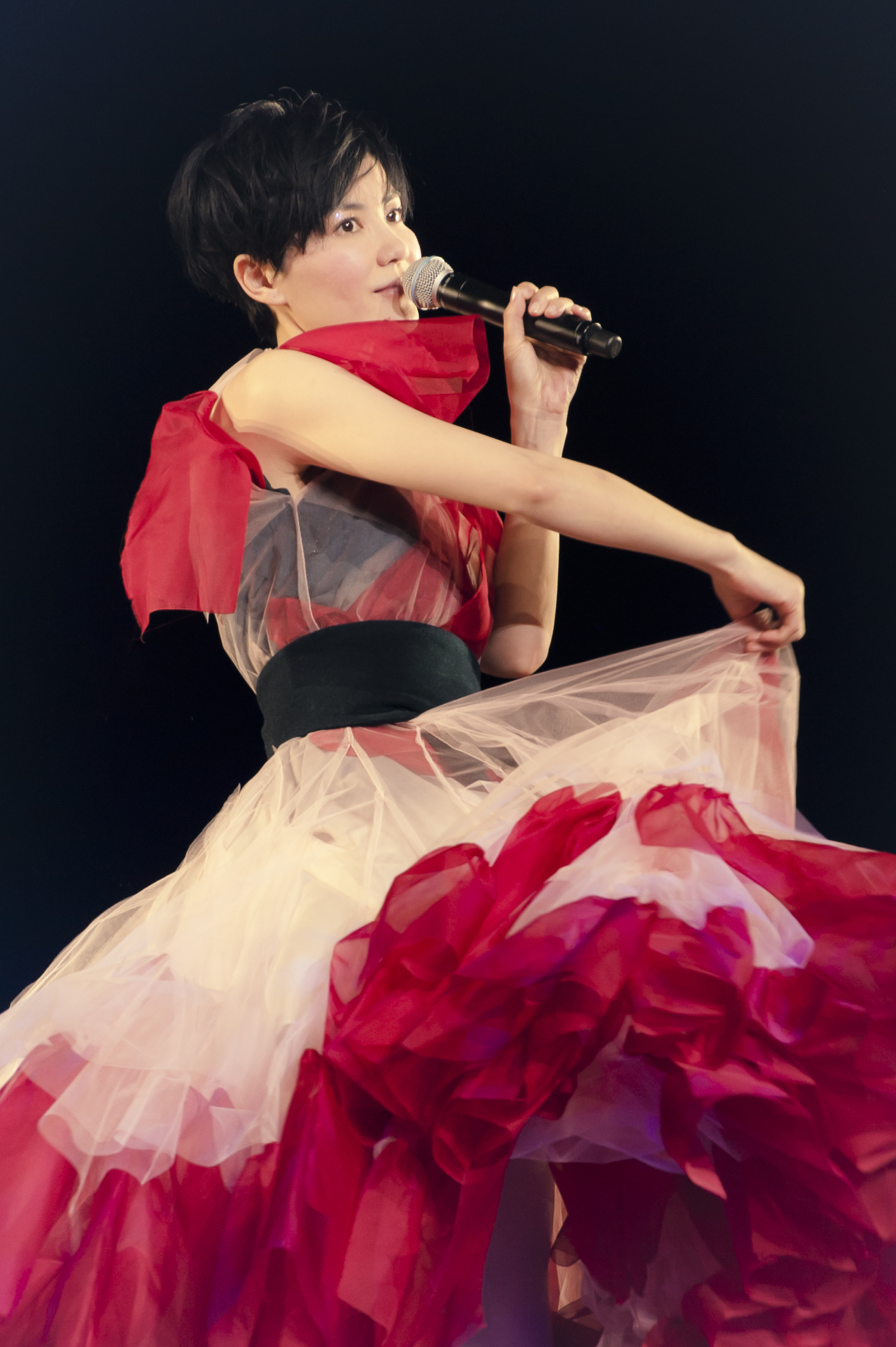
Faye Wong's character is named "Wang Jing-wen" (Chinese: 王靖雯; pinyin: Wáng Jìngwén; Jyutping: Wong4 Zing6 Man4), identical to her stage name from 1989 to 1994.

- Faye Wong as Wang Jing-wen, the older daughter of Mr. Wang. She was in love with a Japanese man, a relationship that her father opposed strongly.
- Takuya Kimura as a Japanese man, sent to Hong Kong for a while by his company, where he becomes Wang Jing-wen's boyfriend.
- Dong Jie as Wang Jie-wen, the younger daughter of Mr. Wang.
- Carina Lau as Mimi/Lulu, a former cabaret dancer and Mo-wan's ex-lover who is still mourning the death of her boyfriend Yuddy. Lau reprises her role from Days of Being Wild.
- Chang Chen as the drummer boyfriend of Mimi/Lulu.
- Zhang Ziyi as Bai Ling. A beautiful cabaret girl and prostitute, a lover of Chow Mo-wan.
- Siu Ping-lam as Ah Ping, a colleague and friend of Chow Mo-wan. Siu reprises his role from In the Mood for Love.
- Bird McIntyre as Bird
- Benz Kong as Brother Hoi
- Berg Ng as Mo-wan's party friend
- Akina Hong as a party girl

== Production ==
It took four years to complete the film. During that time, production was closed because of the SARS epidemic in March 2003.

It was picked up by Sony Pictures Classics for distribution in the United States, and was released on 5 August 2005.

== Critical reception ==
On review aggregator Rotten Tomatoes, the film has an approval rating of 87% based on 119 reviews, with an average rating of 7.40/10. The website's critical consensus reads, "Director Wong Kar-Wai has created in 2046 another visually stunning, atmospheric, and melancholy movie about unrequited love and loneliness." On Metacritic, the film has a weighted average score of 78 out of 100 based on 34 critic reviews, indicating "generally favorable reviews".

One of the most positive reviews came from Manohla Dargis in The New York Times, who called the film "an unqualified triumph", and praised Zhang Ziyi's performance, saying: "Ms. Zhang's shockingly intense performance burns a hole in the film that gives everything, including all the other relationships, a sense of terrific urgency." Dargis also describes the film:

"Routinely criticized for his weak narratives, Mr. Wong is one of the few filmmakers working in commercial cinema who refuse to be enslaved by traditional storytelling. He isn't the first and certainly not the only one to pry cinema from the grip of classical narrative, to take a pickax to the usual three-act architecture (or at least shake the foundation), while also dispatching with the art-deadening requirements (redemption, closure, ad nauseam) that have turned much of Big Hollywood into a creative dead zone. Like some avant-garde filmmakers and like his contemporary, Hou Hsiao-hsien of Taiwan, among precious few others these days, Mr. Wong makes movies, still a young art, that create meaning through visual images, not just words."

In Premiere, Glenn Kenny gave the film four stars and ranked it as one of the ten best films of 2005:

"Insanely evocative '60s-style landscapes and settings share screen space with claustrophobic futuristic CGI metropolises; everyone smokes and drinks too much; musical themes repeat as characters get stuck in their own self-defeating modes of eternal return. A puzzle, a valentine, a sacred hymn to beauty, particularly that of Ziyi Zhang, almost preternaturally gorgeous and delivering an ineffable performance, and a cynical shrug of the shoulders at the damned impermanence of it all, 2046 is a movie to live in."

Said Ty Burr of The Boston Globe:

"Is it worth the challenge? Of course it is. Wong stands as the leading heir to the great directors of post-WWII Europe: His work combines the playfulness and disenchantment of Godard, the visual fantasias of Fellini, the chic existentialism of Antonioni, and Bergman's brooding uncertainties. In this film, he drills further into an obsession with memory, time, and longing than may even be good for him, and his world reflects and refracts our own more than may be comfortable for us."

Daniel Eagan of Film Journal International:

"it's clear his [Wong Kar-wai] skills and interests have no match in today's cinema. Whatever his motives, Wong has assembled a remarkable team for this film. The cinematography, production design and editing combine for a mood of utter languor and decadence. Leung Chiu-wai continues his string of outstanding roles, while pop singer Wong achieves a gravity missing from her earlier work...it's Zhang who is the real surprise here...her performance puts her on a level with the world's best actresses."

One of the less enthusiastic reviews came from Roger Ebert who, in the Chicago Sun-Times, gave the film a mildly-negative 2½ stars out of a possible four and a "marginal thumbs down" on the television show Ebert & Roeper.

"2046 arrived at the last minute at Cannes 2003, after missing its earlier screenings; the final reel reportedly arrived at the airport almost as the first was being shown. It was said to be unfinished, and indeed there were skeletal special effects that now appear in final form, but perhaps it was never really finished in his mind. Perhaps he would have appreciated the luxury that Woody Allen had with Crimes and Misdemeanors; he looked at the first cut of the film, threw out the first act, called the actors back and reshot, focusing on what turned out to be the central story. Watching 2046, I wonder what it could possibly mean to anyone not familiar with Wong's work and style. Unlike In the Mood for Love, it is not a self-contained film, although it's certainly a lovely meander."

The official journal of the Film Society of Lincoln Center, Film Comment's 2005 end-of-the-year film critics' poll, placed the film as the second best film of that year, with 668 points. 2046 was called the best film of 2005 by Michael Atkinson (The Village Voice), Daryl Chin (Journal of Performance and Art), Josef Brown (Vue Weekly), Sean Burns (Philadelphia Weekly), Will Sloan (The Martingrove Beacon), and Justine Elias (The Guardian), and was ranked among the top ten best films of the year by Manohla Dargis (The New York Times), Richard Corliss (Time Magazine), Sam Adams (Philadelphia City Paper), Leslie Camhi (The Village Voice), Jason Anderson (eye Weekly), Gary Dretzka (Movie City News), Godfrey Cheshire (The Independent Weekly), Ty Burr (The Boston Globe), Liza Bear (indieWIRE), Edward Crouse (The Village Voice), Jeffrey M. Anderson (The San Francisco Examiner), John DeFore (Austin American Statesman), Brian Brooks (indieWIRE), Chris Barsanti (Filmcritic.com), F.X. Feeney (L.A. Weekly), David Ehrenstein (New Times), J. Hoberman (The Village Voice), Robert Horton (Everett Herald), Bilge Ebiri (Nerve), and Eugene Hernandez (indieWIRE).

== Box office and distribution ==
2046 opened in North America on 5 August 2005, where it grossed US$113,074 on four screens ($28,268 average). In Wong Kar-wai's home country of Hong Kong, 2046 earned a total of US$778,138. It went on to gross a total of $1,444,588 in North America, playing at 61 venues at its widest release. Its total worldwide box office gross is US$19,271,312.

Sony Pictures Home Entertainment released the film on DVD on 26 December 2005. Since then, it has yet to be re-released or restored in the United States. A region free Blu-ray was released by EOS Entertainment on 17 September 2014 in South Korea, as part of a Wong Kar Wai boxset.

The film finally debuted on Blu-ray in the United States on 23 March 2021 in a set compiled by the Criterion Collection entitled "World of Wong Kar-wai" and includes this film alongside 6 of his other films.

== Accolades ==
In April 2004, the film was nominated for the Golden Palm at the 2004 Cannes Film Festival.

In November 2004, it won awards for Best Art Direction and Best Original Film Score at the Golden Horse Film Festival in Taiwan. The same year, it also won the European Film Award for Best Non-European Film, the Best Foreign Language Film award at the San Sebastián International Film Festival, and was voted Best Foreign Language Film by the New York Film Critics Circle, while taking second place at the Boston Society of Film Critics and Los Angeles Film Critics Association Awards in the same category.

In March 2005, it was nominated in numerous categories at the Hong Kong Film Awards, winning Best Actor (Tony Leung), Best Actress (Zhang Ziyi), Best Cinematography (Christopher Doyle), Best Costume Design and Make-Up, Best Art Direction, and Best Original Film Score (Shigeru Umebayashi).

== Music ==
Original music:

- Shigeru Umebayashi – "2046 Main Theme" (scenes 5, 15 and closing credits), "2046 Main Theme (Rumba Version)" (scene 25), "Interlude I" (scenes 29, 38), "Polonaise" (scenes 37, 43), "Lost", "Long Journey" (Scenes 40–41), "Interlude II" (Scene 30), "2046 Main Theme" (With Percussion, Train Remix)

Adopted music:

- Peer Raben – "Dark Chariot" (Scenes 7–9, 12–13) from Rainer Werner Fassbinder's Querelle (1982) and "Sisyphos at Work" (Scene 4) from Fassbinder's film The Third Generation (1979)
- Xavier Cugat – "Siboney" (scenes 6 (instrumental), 17, 19, 24), "Perfidia" (scenes 10, 39)
- Connie Francis – "Siboney"
- Dean Martin – "Sway" (scene 18)
- Georges Delerue – "Julien et Barbara" from François Truffaut's Vivement Dimanche! (1983) (scenes 21–23, 42)
- Vincenzo Bellini and Felice Romani – "Casta Diva" from Bellini's Norma, performed by Angela Gheorghiu and the London Symphony Orchestra, directed by Evelino Pidò – recorded in 2000 (scenes 11, 14, 28, 36) and Bellini's Il pirata (scenes 16, 26)
- Zbigniew Preisner – "Decision" from Thou shalt not kill, part 5 of Krzysztof Kieślowski's The Decalogue
- Secret Garden – "Adagio" with David Agnew (cor anglais) (scenes 3, 27, 31, 34)
- Nat King Cole and the Nat King Cole Trio – "The Christmas Song" (1946 version with strings) (scenes 20, 35)

== See also ==
- List of films set in Hong Kong
- List of Hong Kong films
- List of TV and films with critiques of Chinese Communist Party
- Six Days
