= Happy Together (1997 film) =

1997 Hong Kong film by Wong Kar-wai

Chinese name
- Traditional Chinese: 春光乍洩
- Simplified Chinese: 春光乍泄
- Literal meaning: spring light at first glance
Transcriptions
Standard Mandarin
- Hanyu Pinyin: Chūnguāng zhàxiè
- Gwoyeu Romatzyh: Chuenguang jahshieh
Yue: Cantonese
- Jyutping: Ceon1 gwong1 zaa3 sit3
- Directed by: Wong Kar-wai
- Written by: Wong Kar-wai
- Produced by: Wong Kar-wai
- Starring: Leslie Cheung; Tony Leung; Chang Chen
- Cinematography: Christopher Doyle
- Edited by: William Chang; Wong Ming-lam
- Music by: Danny Chung
- Production companies: Jet Tone Production; Block 2 Pictures; Seowoo Film Company; Prénom H Co. Ltd.
- Distributed by: Golden Harvest Company
- Release dates: 17 May 1997 (Cannes); 30 May 1997 (Hong Kong)
- Running time: 96 minutes
- Country: Hong Kong
- Languages: Cantonese; Spanish; English; Mandarin
- Box office: HK$8,600,141 (HK) $320,319 (US)

Happy Together (Chinese: 春光乍洩) is a 1997 Hong Kong romantic drama film written and directed by Wong Kar-wai and starring Leslie Cheung and Tony Leung Chiu-wai as a turbulent gay couple. The English title is inspired by the Turtles' 1967 song, which is covered by Danny Chung on the soundtrack. The Chinese title (previously used for Michelangelo Antonioni's Blowup) is an idiomatic expression suggesting "the exposure of something intimate".

A landmark of Hong Kong LGBT cinema, the film was regarded as one of the best LGBT films in the New Queer Cinema movement and received critical acclaim and screened at several film festivals such as the 1997 Toronto International Film Festival; it was nominated for the Palme d'Or and won Best Director at the 1997 Cannes Film Festival.

In 2022, Happy Together was ranked the 225th greatest film of all time in the Sight & Sound critics' poll. In 2016, the film was ranked the 3rd greatest LGBT film of all time in the British Film Institute poll. In 2018, it was ranked the 71st greatest foreign-language film of all time in the BBC poll.

== Plot ==
Ho Po-Wing and Lai Yiu-Fai are a gay couple from Hong Kong with a turbulent relationship marked by frequent separations and reconciliations. They visit Argentina together but break up after they become lost while traveling to visit the Iguazu Falls. Without the money to fly home, Fai begins to work as a doorman at a tango bar in Buenos Aires, while Po-Wing lives promiscuously, often seen by Fai with different men. After Fai accuses Po-Wing of spending all of his money and stranding him in Argentina, Po-Wing steals from one of his acquaintances and is severely beaten. Fai allows Po-Wing to live with him in his small rented room and cares for his injuries. They attempt to reconcile their relationship, though it is marred by mutual suspicion and jealousy.

Fai loses his job at the tango bar after beating the man who injured Po-Wing. He begins working at a Chinese restaurant where he befriends Chang, a Taiwanese co-worker. Later, Po-Wing and Fai have a final argument where Fai refuses to return Po-Wing's passport. Po-Wing moves out of the apartment when he fully recovers. Some time later, Chang leaves Buenos Aires to continue his travels. Having finally earned enough money to fly home, Fai decides to visit the Iguazu Falls alone before he leaves. Meanwhile, Po-Wing returns to the empty apartment, heartbroken, realizing that Fai is gone for good.

Fai returns to Hong Kong but has a stopover in Taipei. Coincidentally, he ends up eating at a food stall in a night market run by Chang's family. He steals a photo of Chang from the booth, saying that even though he does not know if he will ever see Chang again, he knows where to find him.

== Cast ==
- Leslie Cheung as Ho Po-Wing
- Tony Leung Chiu-Wai as Lai Yiu-Fai
- Chen Chang as Chang

== Release ==
=== Box office ===
During its Hong Kong theatrical release, Happy Together made HK$8,600,141 at the box office.

Happy Together also had a limited theatrical run in North America through Kino International, where it grossed US$320,319.

=== Censorship ===
The producers of the film considered censoring the film, specifically the opening sex scene for certain audiences. Posters for the movie featuring the two leads fully clothed with their legs intertwined were banned from public places in Hong Kong and removed altogether before the movie's release.

=== Home media ===
Kino International released the film on DVD and Blu-ray on June 8, 2010. This release has gone out of print.

The film was picked up by the Criterion Collection and released on March 23, 2021, on Blu-ray in a collection of seven Wong Kar-wai films.

=== Critical reception ===
The film was generally well received in Hong Kong and has since been heavily analyzed by many Chinese and Hong Kongese scholars and film critics such as Rey Chow (周蕾) and 陳劍梅.

A Hong Kong film review site called it an "elliptical, quicksilver experiment" that is "pure Wong Kar-Wai, which is equal parts longing, regret, and pathetic beauty" and applauding it for its cinematography.

Due to the international recognition that the film received, it was reviewed in several major U.S. publications. Edward Guthmann, of the San Francisco Chronicle, gave the film an ecstatic review, lavishing praise on Wong for his innovative cinematography and directorial approach; whilst naming Jack Kerouac and William Burroughs amongst those who would have been impressed by his film. Stephen Holden, of the New York Times, said it was a more coherent, heartfelt movie than Wong's previous films, without losing the stylism and brashness of his earlier efforts.

Derek Elley for Variety gave an overall positive review despite its lack of plot, calling it Wong's "most linear and mature work for some time". Elley praised the mise-en-scène, music, and William Chang's production design. He emphasized that Christopher Doyle was the "real star" of the film for his grainy and high contrast cinematography. Both Elley and Andrew Thayne for Asian Movie Pulse stated that both Leslie Cheung and Tony Leung Chiu-Wai excelled as the main characters in the film.

However, Jonathan Rosenbaum gave the film a mixed review in the Chicago Reader. Rosenbaum, in a summary of the film, criticised it for having a vague plotline and chastised Wong's "lurching around". In Box Office Magazine, Wade Major gave the film one of its most negative reviews, saying that it offered "little in the way of stylistic or narrative progress, although it should please his core fans." He deprecated Wong's cinematography, labelling it "random experimentation" and went on to say this was "unbearably tedious" due to the lack of narrative.

As per the review aggregator website Rotten Tomatoes, 84% of critics have given the film a positive review based on 43 reviews, with an average rating of 7.40 out of 10. The site's critics consensus reads: "Happy Together's strong sense of style complements its slice of life love story, even if the narrative slogs". On Metacritic, the film has a weighted average score of 70 out of 100, with 71% positive reviews based on 17 critics, indicating "generally favorable reviews".

== Accolades ==
Ceremony	Category	Recipient	Outcome
1997 Cannes Film Festival	Best Director	Wong Kar-wai	Won
1997 Cannes Film Festival	Palme d'Or		Nominated
7th Arizona International Film Festival	Audience Award – Most Popular Foreign Film		Won
34th Golden Horse Awards	Best Director	Wong Kar-wai	Nominated
34th Golden Horse Awards	Best Actor	Leslie Cheung	Nominated
34th Golden Horse Awards	Best Cinematography	Christopher Doyle	Won
17th Hong Kong Film Awards	Best Film		Nominated
17th Hong Kong Film Awards	Best Director	Wong Kar-wai	Nominated
17th Hong Kong Film Awards	Best Actor	Tony Leung	Won
17th Hong Kong Film Awards	Best Actor	Leslie Cheung	Nominated
17th Hong Kong Film Awards	Best Supporting Actor	Chang Chen	Nominated
17th Hong Kong Film Awards	Best Art Direction	William Chang	Nominated
17th Hong Kong Film Awards	Best Cinematography	Christopher Doyle	Nominated
17th Hong Kong Film Awards	Best Costume and Make-up Design	William Chang	Nominated
17th Hong Kong Film Awards	Best Film Editing	William Chang, Wong Ming-lam	Nominated
4th Hong Kong Film Critics Society Awards	Film of Merit		Won
14th Independent Spirit Awards	Best Foreign Film		Nominated

In 1997, Wong Kar-wai was already well known in the art house Chinese cinema world because of the success of his previous films: Days of Being Wild, Chungking Express, and Ashes of Time. However, by winning the Cannes festival award for Best Director for Happy Together, his first major award, Wong was given a spotlight on the international stage.

== Music ==
In this film, Wong Kar-wai moved away from his previous centralization of American and British music, favouring South American music instead. This transnationalism "decentralizes America" and forms new connections between cultures that are not conventionally linked (Hong Kong and Argentina). The first song of the film, Caetano Veloso's cover of "Cucurrucucú paloma", a sad ballad about a man waiting for his lover to return, plays when the couple breaks up for the first time in the film. Here, the Iguazu Falls are seen for the first time and it is also the first shot of the film that is in colour. The song extends Fai's thoughts, where he is imagining the waterfall, which he associated with Po-Wing. His sadness and lovesickness thereby become apparent in this South American setting.

=== Musical motifs ===
The Frank Zappa song "Chunga's Revenge" is played throughout the movie "emphasizing [Fai's] difficult relationship with [Po-Wing]." The loud guitar chorus represents Po-Wing's "volatile, flamboyant nature", which contrasts the somber trumpet and slower beat representing Fai's sensitivity and steadiness. This song is also linked to Lai's loneliness and his longing to be "happy together" while showing the difference between the two characters and the increasing emotional distance between them as the film progresses.

Astor Piazzolla's "Prologue (Tango Apasionado)", "Finale (Tango Apasionado)", and "Milonga for Three" and similar bandoneon songs play when the couple is both together and apart, representing their relationship. These songs play during romantic scenes such as the taxi scene and the tango in the kitchen. However, it is also played after Fai and Po-Wing break up for the last time and Po-Wing dances the tango with a random man while thinking about when he danced with Fai. The last time this song is played is when Fai reaches the waterfall and the same shot of the Iguazu Falls at the beginning of the film is seen but this time with the "Finale" song. This "eulogizes that relationship" as Po-Wing breaks down in Fai's old apartment, realizing that he has abandoned their relationship because Fai left behind the lamp while Fai mourns their relationship at the falls. Wong Kar-wai discovered Piazzolla's music when he bought his CDs in the Amsterdam airport on his way to Buenos Aires to film this movie.

"Happy Together", the Turtles' song covered by Danny Chung, is the last song to be played in the film, when Fai is on the train in Taipei. This song is used to subvert Western music tropes that use it "to celebrate a budding romance or as an ironic commentary on the lack of such a romance." It also shows that "Lai is at peace with their relationship, making it a crucial narrative device denoting the meaning of the film."

While interpretations vary, Wong Kar-wai has said that:

"In this film, some audiences will say that the title seems to be very cynical, because it is about two persons living together, and at the end, they are just separate. But to me, happy together can apply to two persons or apply to a person and his past, and I think sometimes when a person is at peace with himself and his past, I think it is the beginning of a relationship which can be happy, and also he can be more open to more possibilities in the future with other people."

== Thematic interpretations ==
=== Nationality, belonging, and cultural identity ===
At the very beginning of the movie, Wong includes shots of Fai's British National Overseas Passport as a way to indicate to the audience that this film will be dealing with issues of nationality.

==== The Handover of Hong Kong ====
Released in May 1997, intentionally before the handover of Hong Kong from the British to China on 30 June 1997 after 100 years of colonial rule, the film represents the uncertainty of the future felt by Hongkongers at the time. The film's subtitle: "A Story About Reunion" also implies that the film would comment on the handover. The inclusion of the date in the opening and the news broadcast of Deng Xiaoping's death on 20 February 1997 serve to place the audience explicitly in the time period immediately before the Handover of Hong Kong. Some have suggested that the English title of the film is in relation to the uncertainty around if Hong Kong and China would be "happy together" after their reunion.

In one interpretation, Po-Wing and Fai represent two sides of Hong Kong that cannot be reconciled: Po-Wing stays in Buenos Aires without a passport, like Hong Kong Chinese people who don't have a real British passport, representing an "eternal exile and diaspora". Fai, however, is able to see the waterfall and go to Taiwan but it is not shown whether Fai is able to reconcile with his father or not. Since Po-Wing wants his passport, meaning he wants to leave Buenos Aires, both main characters show that they feel uncertain about their place in the diaspora.

A different interpretation stated that Fai, a gay man, represents the social freedoms that Hongkongers possess and the runaway son who travelled to the other side of the world: Buenos Aires in the film and Britain historically. But, this son (Hong Kong and Fai) "must return and reconcile his differences with old-fashioned China," which is represented by Fai's father. Chang represents Taiwan, a country with a similar past as Hong Kong with China, who comforts Fai (Hong Kong), showing him that there is hope for the future. This hope is demonstrated through the increasing saturation of the film as Fai's life becomes more and more stable.

==== Hong Kong, Taiwan, and Buenos Aires ====
Wong's choice of Buenos Aires is particular because it is the antipode of Hong Kong, meaning it is on the opposite side of the world and in an opposite time. This had been interpreted as a place where Fai and Po-Wing were looking for the opposite of home and Hong Kong. They do not describe this as a political allegory but rather a questioning of cultural identity and the definitions of "home, belonging, and migrancy". Another interpretation viewed the scenes of Hong Kong shot upside down not as a political allegory either, but a way to show how far the characters were from their roots.

Similarly, the theme of displacement from Hong Kong to Buenos Aires interestingly emphasizes their similarities rather than their differences when compared to the shots of Hong Kong in Wong Kar-wai's previous films. Despite being on the other side of the world and far from their "home", the couple experiences the same problems, implying the inevitability of their relationship's deterioration. By emphasizing the similarities between these two places, Wong emphasizes the homelessness and lack of belonging of both Fai and Po-Wing.

==== Confinement ====
Another theme of the film is the sense of confinement and claustrophobia that accompanies the sense of non-belonging of Fai and Po-Wing. This is conveyed through the shaky handheld camera, the small size, poor lighting, and dirtiness of Fai's apartment, the kitchen, alleys, the tango bar, the restaurant kitchen, and the public bathroom corridor. This confinement is also manifested through Po-Wing's confinement to Fai's apartment because his injured hands prevent him from taking care of himself. Later, Po-Wing is also confined to Buenos Aires because Fai refuses to return his passport. Yet, the imagery of the Iguazu Falls contrasts the theme of confinement with the symbolic openness of possibility and hope for Po-Wing and Fai's relationship.

==== Marginalization ====
One interpretation explained that the lack of a sense of belonging due to a combination of their marginal race, sexuality, and language in Buenos Aires and Hong Kong prevented Po-Wing and Fai from forming a stable relationship. This instability is in part shown through the instability of the camera in some shots, relating to the characters's inability to find their own place in the world. Neither place is welcoming and the couple experiences the same problems in both places.

The marginalization of Fai specifically is demonstrated by the way he visually cannot blend into the crowds and environments in Buenos Aires in comparison to Taipei. It is only in Taipei that Fai smiles, and it is implied that he feels a sense of belonging as he visits the Chang family noodle shop and takes the train. The movie does not definitively show that Fai returns to Hong Kong, making it possible that he stayed in Taipei, where he feels like he belongs and begins to have hope for the future.

=== The Iguazu Falls and the lamp ===
The importance of the Iguazu Falls is established early on in the film when it is shown on the lamp that Po-Wing bought for Fai and is said to be the entire reason the couple chose to go to Buenos Aires in the first place. The real waterfall is then shown in Fai's imaginings after the first breakup as the first shot in colour. It is also shot from a bird's-eye view and given unrealistic blue and green colouring, giving it a supernatural visual effect.

One scholar interpreted the representation of the falls as a contemplation on the immensity of mother nature's power and the unpredictable nature of the future since the end of the waterfall is imperceivable. It also evokes a feeling of powerlessness in the face of nature and the future, paralleling the inevitability of the deterioration of Po-Wing and Fai's relationship.

Another scholar interpreted the waterfall itself as a symbol of Po-Wing and Fai's relationship because "their passion is indeed torrential, destructive, always pounding away as it falls head forward and spirals downward towards an uncertain end".

The falls are seen throughout the film on the lamp in Fai's apartment, representing the continued hope and investment in his relationship with Po-Wing. However, when Fai finally visits the Iguazu Falls but without Po-Wing, leaving the lamp behind, Po-Wing understands that Fai has finally abandoned their relationship. Both Fai and Po-Wing mourn their relationship by looking at the waterfall, Fai seeing it in reality, and Po-Wing after having fixed the lamp's rotating mechanism.

=== Homosexuality ===
The portrayal of homosexuality in the film is indisputable. On one hand, it is characterized as "one of the best films chronicling gay love ever made" because of the universality of the problems that Fai and Po-Wing face in their relationship that exist in any relationship no matter the gender of the participants. Many scholars and film critics agree that while being gay is not the subject of the film, its portrayal of gay romance is realistic. The film was praised for not casting the characters on gendered lines, questioning their manliness, and showing the complexity of gay men as social beings and individuals.

Wong Kar-wai explained that:

"In fact, I don't like people to see this film as a gay film. It's more like a story about human relationships and somehow the two characters involved are both men. Normally I hate movies with labels like 'gay film,' 'art film' or 'commercial film.' There is only good film and bad film."

On the other hand, some scholars argue that one of the reasons that Po-Wing and Fai ended up in Buenos Aires is because they are gay and are thus exiled homosexual men. Jeremy Tambling, an author and critic, noted that the universalization of the gay relationship is not a positive aspect of the film because it erases the specificity of their experiences and the film's theme of marginalization. Furthermore, the film broadly portrays neo-Confucian values of hard work, frugality, and normativity, emphasizing social conformity to Chinese working values. Fai is rewarded for following these values, as he works constantly, cooks, cares for others, wants to reconcile with his father, and saves his money, while Po-Wing lives in excess through his numerous sexual encounters, spending, lack of traditional work, and flamboyance. At the end of the film, Fai is able to reach his destination, Hong Kong/Taiwan and the Iguazu Falls, while Po-Wing is stuck in Buenos Aires. Chang also represents these values, as he works hard at the restaurant, saves enough money for his trip to the 'end of the world,' and has a loving family to return to in Taipei. The characters who conform to this normativity are rewarded while others are punished, thus emphasizing a narrative wherein gay men "succeed" when conforming to other cultural etiquettes unrelated to their sexualities.

== Legacy ==
Since its release, Happy Together has been described as the "most acclaimed gay Asian film", remaining in the public consciousness.

South African singer, songwriter, and actor Nakhane cited Happy Together as one of their three favourite films of all time.

James Laxton, the cinematographer for the critically acclaimed film Moonlight (2016), explained in a Time article that he was inspired by Happy Together and another Wong work, In the Mood for Love (2000). The use of natural and ambient light mixed with small warm fill lights, as well as touches of colour enlightened Laxton to create a "dream-like sense of reality" in his film. More specifically, he cited the scene where Chiron's mother scolds him and the pink light emanates from her bedroom as particularly inspired by Wong Kar-wai's works.

The 2006 Russian sitcom Happy Together, a remake of Married... with Children, took its name from the name of the film.

At the 2017 Golden Horse Awards, Happy Together was re-screened in celebration of the film's 20th anniversary. The main promotional poster for the award ceremony used a screenshot from the film of the main actors as well as shots of the Iguazu Falls.

At the 2022 Buenos Aires International Festival of Independent Cinema, Happy Together was re-screened in celebration of the film's 25th anniversary. Rolling Stone magazine called this a "non-official protagonist of the festival", since the debut documentary film, BJ: The Life and Times of Bosco and Jojo, was premiered in the festival ("Special Nights" section), narrating the encounter with the Hong Kong filmmaker.
