= In the Mood for Love =

2000 film by Wong Kar-wai

Chinese name
- Traditional Chinese: 花樣年華
- Simplified Chinese: 花样年华
- Literal meaning: Flower-like Years
Transcriptions
Standard Mandarin
- Hanyu Pinyin: huāyàng niánhuá
Yue: Cantonese
- Jyutping: faa1joeng6 nin4waa4
- Directed by: Wong Kar-wai
- Written by: Wong Kar-wai
- Produced by: Wong Kar-wai
- Starring: Maggie Cheung; Tony Leung Chiu-wai
- Cinematography: Christopher Doyle; Ping Bin Lee
- Edited by: William Chang; Kwong Chi-Leung
- Music by: Michael Galasso
- Production companies: Jet Tone Production; Paradis Films
- Distributed by: Block 2 Pictures (Hong Kong); Océan Films (France)
- Release dates: 20 May 2000 (Cannes); 29 September 2000 (Hong Kong); 8 November 2000 (France)
- Running time: 98 minutes
- Countries: Hong Kong; France
- Languages: Cantonese; Shanghainese
- Budget: $3 million
- Box office: $17 million

In the Mood for Love (traditional Chinese: 花樣年華; simplified Chinese: 花样年华; lit. 'Flower-like Years', 'the prime of one's youth') is a 2000 romantic drama film written, directed, and produced by Wong Kar-wai. An international co-production between Hong Kong and France, the film follows a man (Tony Leung) and a woman (Maggie Cheung) in 1962 who discover that their spouses are having an affair. As they spend time together, they gradually develop feelings for one another. It is the second installment in an informal trilogy, preceded by Days of Being Wild (1990) and followed by 2046 (2004).

The film premiered in the official competition at the 53rd Cannes Film Festival, where it received acclaim. Leung won the Best Actor award, becoming the first Hong Kong actor to receive the honour. In the Mood for Love was selected as Hong Kong's submission for Best International Feature Film at the 73rd Academy Awards, though it was not nominated. It is often listed as one of the greatest films of all time and one of the major works of Asian cinema.

== Plot ==
In 1962 British Hong Kong, Shanghainese expatriates Chow Mo-wan, a journalist, and Su Li-zhen (Mrs. Chan), a secretary at a shipping company, rent rooms in adjacent apartments. Each has a spouse who often works late, leaving them alone during overtime shifts. Due to the friendly but overbearing presence of Su's Shanghainese landlady, Mrs. Suen, and their bustling, mahjong-playing neighbours, Chow and Su are frequently left alone in their rooms and rarely dine with the other tenants.

Although they are initially polite out of necessity, they grow closer as they realise their spouses are having an affair with each other. Chow notices that his wife owns a handbag available only overseas—one that Su's husband had purchased for her. Su, in turn, observes that her husband wears a tie identical to one Chow owns, a gift from Chow's wife. As they piece together the truth, they begin to reenact how the affair may have begun. While both accept that their spouses have betrayed them, they strive to avoid making the same mistake themselves.

Chow invites Su to help him write a martial arts serial. Their increased time together draws the attention of their neighbours, prompting Chow to rent a hotel room where they can work in private. As time passes, they acknowledge their growing feelings for each other. They continue reenacting scenes from their spouses' affair, but the emotional toll unsettles Su. They sometimes stop speaking, only to reconnect later. When Chow receives a job offer in Singapore, he asks Su to come with him. She agrees, but arrives at the hotel too late and breaks down in his empty room.

The following year, in Singapore, Chow tells a friend an old story: when someone had a secret, they would climb a mountain, carve a hollow in a tree, whisper the secret into it, and seal it with mud. Su later visits Chow's apartment in Singapore. She calls him but says nothing when he answers. Afterward, Chow notices a lipstick-stained cigarette butt in his ashtray and realises she had been there.

Three years later, Su visits Mrs. Suen, who is preparing to immigrate to the United States, and inquires about renting her old apartment. Some time afterward, Chow returns to Hong Kong to visit his former landlords, the Koos, who have moved to the Philippines. He asks about the Suen family next door, and the new owner informs him that a woman and her son now live there. Chow leaves.

During the Vietnam War, Chow travels to Cambodia and visits Angkor Wat. As a monk looks on, he whispers into a hollow in a wall and seals it with mud.

== Cast ==
- Maggie Cheung as Su Li-zhen (Mrs. Chan)
- Tony Leung Chiu-wai as Chow Mo-wan
- Siu Ping as Ah Ping, Chow's co-worker
- Rebecca Pan as Mrs. Suen, the Chans' landlady
- Kelly Lai Chen as Mr. Ho, Su's employer
- Joe Cheung as man living in Mr. Koo's apartment
- Chan Man-Lei as Mr. Koo, the Chows' landlord
- Chin Tsi-ang as Suen's amah (female servant)
- Roy Cheung as Mr. Chan (voice)
- Paulyn Sun as Mrs. Chow

== Title ==
The film's original Chinese title, meaning "the age of blossoms" or "the flowery years" – a Chinese metaphor for the fleeting time of youth, beauty and love – derives from a song of the same name by Zhou Xuan from a 1946 film. The English title derives from the song "I'm in the Mood for Love". Director Wong had planned to name the film Secrets until listening to the song late in post-production.

== Production ==
=== Development and pre-production ===
In the Mood for Love went through a long gestation period. In the 1990s, Wong Kar-wai found some commercial success, much critical acclaim, and wide influence on other filmmakers throughout Asia and the world with films such as Chungking Express and Fallen Angels, both set in present-day Hong Kong. His 1997 film Happy Together was also successful internationally, winning him Best Director at the Cannes Film Festival and surprising many. It was even popular with mainstream audiences in Hong Kong, despite its then-unusual focus on a gay love story and its having been largely improvised in Argentina, a landscape unfamiliar to Wong. By the end of the decade, with sovereignty of Hong Kong transferred from Britain to the People's Republic of China, Wong was eager to work once more in the mainland, where he had been born. He had been dissatisfied with the final result of his 1994 wuxia epic Ashes of Time, which was set in ancient times and filmed in remote desert regions, and decided to deal with a more 20th-century, urban setting.

By 1998, Wong had developed a concept for his next film Summer in Beijing. Although no script was finalised, he and cameraman Christopher Doyle had been to Tiananmen Square and other areas of the city to do a small amount of unauthorised shooting. Wong told journalists the film was to be a musical and a love story. Wong secured the participation of Tony Leung Chiu-wai and Maggie Cheung to star, and with his background in graphic design, had even made posters for the film. He had begun work on script treatments, which since Days of Being Wild, he tended to treat as only a very loose basis for his work to secure financing, preferring to leave things open to change during the shoot.

It transpired that there would be difficulties securing permission to shoot in Beijing with Wong's spontaneous methods of working and potential political sensitivities in setting his film in mid-20th century China. Wong had come to think of Summer in Beijing as a triptych of stories, much like his original concept of Chungking Express (in which the third story had been spun off into the film Fallen Angels). Quickly, Wong decided to jettison this structure, saving only one of the three planned stories, which had been titled provisionally, A Story of Food, and dealt with a woman and a man who shared noodles and secrets. As he reunited with his actors and production team, most of whom had collaborated several times before, Wong decided A Story of Food would be the heart of his next film. The story would slowly evolve into In the Mood for Love, after transposing its setting away from mainland China and back to 1960's Hong Kong.

Wong had set his breakthrough Days of Being Wild in that time in Hong Kong, when mainland-born Chinese and their memories, including those of Wong, then a young child, had a strong presence in the territory. Still saturated with the sounds of 1930's and 1940's Shanghai singing stars and the ideals they represented, the time also reminded him of the wide array of vibrant dance music floating in over the Pacific from the Philippines, Hawaii, Latin America and the United States, which Wong had used as a backdrop in Days of Being Wild. Wong had regarded Days of Being Wild upon its release in 1990 as an artistic success, and had planned a sequel to it. However, his producers had been disappointed by its box-office returns, particularly given that its shoot had been prolonged and expensive, with Wong, who had come out of the Hong Kong industry, first attempting to work more independently, including collaborating for the first time with cinematographer Christopher Doyle, who favoured jazz-like spontaneity in his shooting methods. Despite involving many of Hong Kong's top stars, the film's profits had been modest, so Wong was not given the opportunity to follow it up. Yet as he moved on to other films, he had always retained the dream of doing so. With the impossibility of the original idea of Summer in Beijing, he was now able to pursue it.

The cast of Maggie Cheung and Tony Leung in A Story of Food (soon to become In the Mood for Love) provided an opportunity to pick up a loose thread of Days of Being Wild, as the actors had appeared in that film, although never together. Leung's few scenes had been left incomplete, awaiting Wong's planned sequel that was never made. 2046, a sequel in its plot to In the Mood for Love, would later serve for Wong as a sequel in spirit to Days of Being Wild, connecting the story of Leung's character in Days and In the Mood. The writing of 2046 essentially began at the same time as that of In the Mood for Love. Because neither film had its plot, structure, or even all its characters, scripted in advance, Wong began working on the ideas that eventually made it into 2046 during the shoot of In the Mood for Love. As he and his collaborators made the film in a variety of settings, its story took shape. Eventually, these constantly developing ideas, taken from one of the remnants of Summer in Beijing, were developed too much to fit into one film. Wong discarded most of the footage and story before arriving at In the Mood, later reshooting and reimagining the rest as 2046.

=== Filming ===
Wong's plan to make a film set primarily in Hong Kong did not simplify matters when it came to the shoot. The city's appearance was much changed since the 1960s, and Wong's personal nostalgia for the time added to his desire for historical accuracy. Wong had little taste for working in studio settings, let alone using special effects to imitate the look of past times. Christopher Doyle later discussed the necessity of filming where the streets, the buildings, and even the sight of clothes hanging on lines (as in 1960's Hong Kong) could give a real energy to the actors and the story, whose outlines were constantly open to revision as shooting progressed. While set in Hong Kong, a portion of the filming (like outdoor and hotel scenes) was shot in less modernised neighbourhoods of Bangkok, Thailand. Further, a brief portion later in the film is set in Singapore (one of Wong's initial inspirations on the story had been a short story set in Hong Kong, Intersection, by the Hong Kong writer Liu Yichang). In its final sequences, the film also incorporates footage of Angkor Wat, Cambodia, where Leung's character is working as a journalist.

The film took 15 months to shoot. The actors found the process inspiring but demanding. They required a lot of work to understand the times, being slightly younger than Wong and having grown up in a rapidly changing Hong Kong or, in Maggie Cheung's case, partly in the United Kingdom.

Cheung portrayed 1930's Chinese screen icon Ruan Lingyu in Stanley Kwan's 1992 film Center Stage, for which she wore qipao, the dresses worn by stylish Chinese women throughout much of the first half of the 20th century. It had been Cheung's most recognised performance to date and her hardest, partly due to the clothing, which restricted her freedom of movement. For Wong's film, Cheung, playing a married woman in her thirties who had carried over the elegance of her younger years in the pre-revolutionary mainland, would again wear qipao, known in Cantonese as cheongsam, and spoke of it as the way of understanding her character Su Li-zhen, whose quiet strength Cheung felt was unlike her own more spontaneous spirit.

The cinematographer Christopher Doyle, for whom the film was the sixth collaboration with Wong Kar-wai, had to leave when production went over schedule and was replaced by Mark Lee Ping Bin, renowned for his work with Taiwanese filmmaker Hou Hsiao-hsien. Both DPs are credited equally for the final film, though Doyle's more typically kinetic style is never on view, and the film is shaped by more subtle, longer shots typically associated with Lee.

Critic Tony Rayns, on the other hand, noted in a commentary on another Wong film that the differing styles of the two cinematographers were blended seamlessly by Wong's own fluid aesthetic. Like all of Wong's previous work, this one was shot on film, not digitally.

Doyle's departure did not result from major artistic arguments with Wong. However, despite his agreement with Wong's spontaneous approach to scripting, he found it frustrating to reshoot many of the key moments over and over in environments throughout Southeast Asia until they felt right to the director. He had to turn down many other projects due to the total commitment, without a clear time limit, required by Wong. Several years later Doyle initially signed on to work on the sequel 2046, but he also abandoned that project halfway through for similar reasons (being replaced by a range of DPs) and has not worked with Wong since. Tony Leung, on the other hand, returned to work on 2046, in which he starred without Maggie Cheung, who made only a brief appearance in already shot footage from In the Mood for Love. Leung also starred in Wong's 2013 film, The Grandmaster. Cheung felt In the Mood for Love was the high point of her career, and she has worked much more infrequently since, starring in several films soon after but within four years, all but retired from acting, despite winning a Best Actress Award at Cannes for 2004's Clean.

=== Post-production ===
The final months of production and post-production on In the Mood for Love, a submission to the Cannes Film Festival in May 2000, were notorious for their confusion. The film was barely finished in time for the festival, as would occur again four years later when Wong submitted 2046. Wong continued shooting more and more of In the Mood for Love with the cast and crew as he worked furiously to edit the massive amounts of footage he had shot over the past year. He removed large chunks of the story to strip it down to its most basic element, the relationship between these characters in the 1960s, with brief allusions to earlier and later times. In the meantime, Wong screened brief segments before the festival for journalists and distributors. Despite the general lack of commercial interest in Chinese cinema at the time by North American media corporations, Wong reached a distribution deal with USA Films for a limited theatrical release in North America based only on a few minutes of footage.

By early 2000, with the deadline for Cannes approaching, Wong was contacted by the director of Cannes, who encouraged him to quickly complete a final cut, and offered a constructive criticism about the title. Although the title in Cantonese and Mandarin is based on a Zhou Xuan song whose English title is translated "Age of Bloom", the international title proved more complex. After discarding Summer in Beijing and A Story of Food, Wong had provisionally settled on Secrets, but Cannes felt this title was not as distinctive as the film Wong was preparing and suggested he should change it.

Finally having completed the cut, but at a loss for titles, Wong was listening to a then-recent album by Bryan Ferry and Roxy Music titled Slave to Love: The Very Best of the Ballads, and noticed a resonance in the song "I'm in the Mood for Love", which shared its title with a popular jazz standard of the mid-20th century. Many of Wong's previous English-language titles had come from pop songs, so he found this title particularly appropriate.

Wong states he was influenced by Hitchcock's Vertigo while making this film and compares Tony Leung's character to James Stewart's:

[T]he role of Tony in the film reminds me of Jimmy Stewart's in Vertigo. There is a dark side to this character. I think it's very interesting that most of the audience prefers to think that this is a very innocent relationship. These are the good guys, because their spouses are the first ones to be unfaithful and they refuse to be. Nobody sees any darkness in these characters—and yet they are meeting in secret to act out fictitious scenarios of confronting their spouses and of having an affair. I think this happens because the face of Tony Leung is so sympathetic. Just imagine if it was John Malkovich playing this role. You would think, 'This guy is really weird.' It's the same in Vertigo. Everybody thinks James Stewart is a nice guy, so nobody thinks that his character is actually very sick.

== Music ==
=== Title song ===
The title track "Hua Yang De Nian Hua" is a song by famous singer Zhou Xuan from the Solitary Island period. The 1946 song is a paean to a happy past and an oblique metaphor for the darkness of Japanese-occupied Shanghai. Wong also set the song to his 2000 short film, named Hua Yang De Nian Hua, after the track.

=== Soundtrack ===
- Shigeru Umebayashi: "Yumeji's Theme" (originally from the soundtrack of Seijun Suzuki's Yumeji)
- Michael Galasso: "Angkor Wat Theme", "ITMFL", "Casanova/Flute"
- Nat King Cole: "Aquellos Ojos Verdes", "Te Quiero Dijiste", "Quizás, Quizás, Quizás"
- Bryan Ferry: "I'm in the Mood for Love" (the inspiration for the English title, found on, e.g., the French two-CD soundtrack, not in the film)
- Zhou Xuan:《花樣的年華》 "Hua Yang De Nian Hua" (the inspiration for the original Chinese title)
- Rebecca Pan: "Bengawan Solo"
- All of the traditional pingtan, Cantonese, Beijing and Yue operas are historic recordings

== Release ==
In the Mood for Love premiered at the 2000 Cannes Film Festival, where it was nominated for the Palme d'Or. It was theatrically released in Hong Kong on 29 September 2000.

=== Restorations ===
In 2020, a 4K restoration from the original film negatives was performed by the Criterion Collection and L'Immagine Ritrovata under the supervision of Wong Kar-wai. The restoration was scheduled to premiere at the 73rd Cannes Film Festival in May 2020, followed by a limited theatrical re-release, but was interrupted by the COVID-19 pandemic. Cannes postponed the showing to October 2020, with the film playing at the Lumière Festival in Lyon instead. A planned release in June 2020 at the Lincoln Center in New York was also rescheduled, with the restoration playing virtually in November 2020.

For its 25th anniversary, the film was re-released in theatres alongside In the Mood for Love 2001. It was released in theatres on 14 February 2025 (Valentine's Day) in China in regular and IMAX formats.

=== Digital and home media ===
The film was released on DVD and Blu-ray, most notably by Criterion, who released a restored high-definition digital transfer in the United States in 2012. Criterion again restored eight of Wong's films in 2020 in a process supervised by the director; controversially, the new versions changed the aspect ratio, colour grading and voiceover of some of the films, including In the Mood for Love. Wong explained his decision by saying, "I invite the audience to join me in starting afresh, as these are not the same films, and we are no longer the same audience."

In 2021, Wong released a 92-second NFT short film titled In the Mood for Love — Day One. It was composed of unused footage shot on the film's first day of production, featuring an alternate storyline and Leung and Cheung playing different characters. It was auctioned at Sotheby's, along with memorabilia from his other films.

== Reception ==
=== Box office ===
In the Mood for Love made HK$8,663,227 during its Hong Kong run.

On 2 February 2001, the film opened in six North American cinemas, earning $113,280 ($18,880 per screen) in its first weekend. It finished its North American run with a gross of $2,738,980. An archival footage featuring a montage of images from vintage Chinese movies is also featured in the DVD collection.

The total worldwide box office gross was US$17M.

=== Critical response ===
On Rotten Tomatoes, the film holds an approval rating of 92% based on 191 reviews. The website's critical consensus reads: "An exquisitely shot showcase for Maggie Cheung and Tony Leung that marks a somber evolution of Wong Kar-wai's chic style, In the Mood for Love is a tantric tease that's liable to break your heart." On Metacritic, the film has a weighted average score of 87 out of 100 based on 28 critic reviews, indicating "universal acclaim".

Roger Ebert of the Chicago Sun-Times gave the film three stars out of four, calling it "a lush story of unrequited love". Elvis Mitchell, writing for The New York Times, referred to it as "probably the most breathtakingly gorgeous film of the year".

Peter Travers of Rolling Stone wrote that "in the hands of a hack, In the Mood for Love could have been a snickering sex farce. In the hands of Wong Kar-wai ... the film is alive with delicacy and feeling". Peter Walker of The Guardian, describing it as his "favourite film", wrote that it provides "profound and moving reflections on life's fundamentals. It's a film about, yes, love; but also betrayal, loss, missed opportunities, memory, the brutality of time's passage, loneliness—the list goes on". David Parkinson of Empire awarded the film five out of five stars, writing that "the performances are masterly, and the photography beautiful. It's a genuinely romantic romance and makes for sublime cinema".

== Influence ==
In the Mood for Love has been called "era-defining ... [evoking] glamour with a streak of grittiness, and the feeling of being adrift," impacting popular culture broadly, including fashion and social media. A wide range of filmmakers have taken inspiration from the film, such as Sofia Coppola and Barry Jenkins, crediting it as a great film and a major influence on their own work.

Wong Kar-wai's aesthetic style has been referenced directly in films as well. The director duo Daniels paid homage to the style of In the Mood for Love in the film Everything Everywhere All at Once.

=== Lists ===
In 2000, Empire ranked it number 42 in its list titled "The 100 Best Films of World Cinema". It was ranked 95th on 100 Best Films from 1983 to 2008 by Entertainment Weekly. In November 2009, Time Out New York ranked the film as the fifth-best of the decade, calling it the "consummate unconsummated love story of the new millennium".

In the 2022 decennial critics' poll conducted by Sight and Sound, In the Mood for Love appeared at number 5, making it the highest-ranked film from the 2000s and one of only two from the 2000s to be listed in the top 10 of all time, along with David Lynch's Mulholland Drive. Wong's film was also the highest-ranked film by a Chinese filmmaker. The film owed its placement to the votes of 42 critics (out of 846) who placed it in their own individual top 10 lists.

In 2015, the Busan International Film Festival ranked the film number 3 in its Asian Cinema 100 list, behind Yasujirō Ozu's Tokyo Story and Akira Kurosawa's Rashomon.

In 2016, the film appeared in second place on BBC's list of 100 Greatest Films of the 21st Century after Mulholland Drive. The film ranked 9th in BBC's 2018 list of The 100 greatest foreign language films voted by 209 film critics from 43 countries around the world.

In 2019, The Guardian ranked the film fifth in its Best Films of the 21st Century list. In 2021, the film was ranked at eighth on Time Out magazine's list of "The 100 Best Movies of All Time". In June 2025, the film ranked fourth on The New York Times' list of "The 100 Best Movies of the 21st Century" and twelfth on its "Readers' Choice" edition of the list. In July 2025, it ranked second on Rolling Stone's list of "The 100 Best Movies of the 21st Century."

== In the Mood for Love 2001 ==
Wong also shot a short film, In the Mood for Love 2001, which also stars Leung and Cheung. He screened the short at the 2001 Cannes Film Festival. Since then, it has rarely been shown. In 2025, the short was released in theatres to celebrate the 25th anniversary of In the Mood for Love.

In the short, Tony Leung's character runs a convenience store in 2001 Hong Kong, and Maggie Cheung's character is one of his regular customers. The customer is in love with a man, and leaves her keys with the store owner for the lover to pick up, but he never does. One day, the store owner gets a bloody nose when chasing down a thief. The customer pops in, also with a bloody nose, and announces that she got in a fight with her lover's mistress. Distressed, the customer gorges on cake before falling asleep in the store. The store owner ponders what to do. He kisses the sleeping customer, rationalising to himself that he is merely cleaning traces of cake from her face. To his surprise, she is not actually sleeping. She embraces him and begins kissing him back.

Wong's 2007 film My Blueberry Nights was partially inspired by the short film. Wong said that he wanted to make a film with Norah Jones and that he adapted the short to an American setting because Jones did not speak Chinese.

== Accolades ==
Accolades received by In the Mood for Love
Award	Date of ceremony	Category	Recipient(s)	Result	Ref.
Argentine Film Critics Association	2002	Best Foreign Language Film	In The Mood for Love	Won	
Asia-Pacific Film Festival	2000	Best Cinematography	Christopher Doyle, Lee Pin-bing	Won	
Asia-Pacific Film Festival	2000	Best Editing	William Chang	Won	
Australian Film Institute	2001	Best Foreign Language Film	In The Mood for Love	Nominated	
British Academy Film Awards	2001	Best Film Not in the English Language	In The Mood for Love	Nominated	
Belgian Syndicate of Cinema Critics	2001	Grand Prix	In The Mood for Love	Won	
British Independent Film Awards	2001	Best Foreign Language Film	In The Mood for Love	Won	
Broadcast Film Critics Association Awards	2002	Best Foreign Language Film	In The Mood for Love	Nominated	
Cannes Film Festival	2000	Best Actor	Tony Leung Chiu-wai	Won	
Cannes Film Festival	2000	Technical Grand Prize	Christopher Doyle, Lee Ping-bing, William Chang	Won	
Cannes Film Festival	2000	Palme d'Or	Wong Kar-Wai	Nominated	
César Awards	2001	Best Foreign Film	In The Mood for Love	Won	
Durban International Film Festival	2001	Best Lead Performance	Maggie Cheung	Won	
Dublin Film Critics Circle Awards	2009	Best Film of the Decade	In The Mood for Love	9th place	
German Film Awards	2001	Best Foreign Film	In The Mood for Love	Won	
Golden Horse Film Festival and Awards	2000	Best Feature Film	In The Mood for Love	Nominated	
Golden Horse Film Festival and Awards	2000	Best Director	Wong Kar-wai	Nominated	
Golden Horse Film Festival and Awards	2000	Best Leading Actor	Tony Leung Chiu-wai	Nominated	
Golden Horse Film Festival and Awards	2000	Best Leading Actress	Maggie Cheung	Won	
Golden Horse Film Festival and Awards	2000	Best Original Screenplay	Wong Kar-wai	Nominated	
Golden Horse Film Festival and Awards	2000	Best Cinematography	Christopher Doyle, Lee Ping-bing	Won	
Golden Horse Film Festival and Awards	2000	Best Makeup & Costume Design	William Chang	Won	
Golden Horse Film Festival and Awards	2000	Best Art Direction	William Chang	Nominated	
Golden Horse Film Festival and Awards	2000	Best Original Film Score	Michael Galasso	Nominated	
Hong Kong Film Awards	2001	Best Actor	Tony Leung Chiu-wai	Won	
Hong Kong Film Awards	2001	Best Actress	Maggie Cheung	Won	
Hong Kong Film Awards	2001	Best Art Direction	William Chang	Won	
Hong Kong Film Awards	2001	Best Costume and Make-up Design	William Chang	Won	
Hong Kong Film Awards	2001	Best Film Editing	William Chang	Won	
Hong Kong Film Awards	2001	Best Picture	In The Mood for Love	Nominated	
Hong Kong Film Awards	2001	Best Director	Wong Kar-wai	Nominated	
Hong Kong Film Awards	2001	Best Supporting Actress	Poon Dick-wah	Nominated	
Hong Kong Film Awards	2001	Best Screenplay	Wong Kar-wai	Nominated	
Hong Kong Film Awards	2001	Best New Performer	Siu Ping-lam	Nominated	
Hong Kong Film Awards	2001	Best Cinematography	Christopher Doyle, Lee Pin-bing	Nominated	
Hong Kong Film Awards	2001	Best Original Score	Michael Galasso	Nominated	
Hong Kong Film Critics Society Award	2001	Best Director	Wong Kar-wai	Won	
Hong Kong Film Critics Society Award	2001	Film of Merit	In The Mood for Love	Won	
London Critics Circle Film Awards	2001	Foreign Language Film of the Year	In The Mood for Love	Nominated	
Los Angeles Film Critics Association Awards	2001	Best Foreign Film	Wong Kar-Wai	Nominated	
Los Angeles Film Critics Association Awards	2001	Best Cinematography	Christopher Doyle, Ping Bin Lee	Nominated	
Montréal Festival of New Cinema	2001	Feature Film Award	Wong Kar-Wai	Won	
National Society of Film Critics	2002	Best Foreign Language Film	In The Mood for Love	Won	
National Society of Film Critics	2002	Best Cinematography	Christopher Doyle, Lee Pin-bing	Won	
New York Film Critics Circle	2001	Best Foreign Language Film	In The Mood for Love	Won	
New York Film Critics Circle	2001	Best Cinematography	Christopher Doyle, Lee Pin-bing	Won	
Turkish Film Critics Association (SIYAD) Awards	2002	Best Foreign Film	In The Mood for Love	Won	

== See also ==
- List of films set in Hong Kong
- List of submissions to the 73rd Academy Awards for Best Foreign Language Film
- List of Hong Kong submissions for the Academy Award for Best Foreign Language Film
