= 14th Hong Kong Film Awards =

1995 Hong Kong Film Awards

- Date: 23 April 1995
- Hosted by: John Sham and Meg Lam

The 14th Hong Kong Film Awards ceremony, honored the best films of 1994 and took place on 23 April 1995 at Hong Kong Academy for Performing Arts, Wan Chai, Hong Kong. The ceremony was hosted by John Sham and Meg Lam, during the ceremony awards are presented in 17 categories.

== Awards ==
Winners are listed first, highlighted in boldface, and indicated with a double dagger (‡).

**Best Film**: **Chungking Express**‡; The Final Option; Ashes of Time; I Have a Date with Spring; He's a Woman, She's a Man	**Best Director**: **Wong Kar-wai — Chungking Express**‡; Tsui Hark — The Lovers; Wong Kar-wai — Ashes of Time; Peter Chan — He's a Woman, She's a Man; Gordon Chan — The Final Option
**Best Screenplay**: **Raymond To — I Have a Date with Spring**‡; James Yuen — Twenty Something; James Yuen and Lee Chi Ngai — He's a Woman, She's a Man; Wong Kar-wai — Ashes of Time; Wong Kar-wai — Chungking Express	**Best Actor**: **Tony Leung — Chungking Express**‡; Eric Kot — Oh! My Three Guys; Leslie Cheung — He's a Woman, She's a Man; Stephen Chow — From Beijing with Love; Chow Yun-fat — Treasure Hunt; Jacky Cheung — To Live and Die in Tsimshatsui
**Best Actress**: **Anita Yuen — He's a Woman, She's a Man**‡; Joan Chen — Red Rose White Rose; Alice Lau — I Have a Date with Spring; Hui Fan — One of the Lucky Ones; Jacklyn Wu — The Returning; Faye Wong — Chungking Express	**Best Supporting Actor**: **Jordan Chan — Twenty Something**‡; Law Kar-ying — From Beijing with Love; Jordan Chan — He's a Woman, She's a Man; Eric Kot — Conjugal Affair; Power Chan — The Final Option
**Best Supporting Actress**: **Koon-Lan Law — I Have a Date with Spring**‡; Fung Wai-Hung — I Have a Date with Spring; Carrie Ng — The Lovers; Sandra Ng — The Returning; Valerie Chow — Chungking Express	**Best New Performer**: **Alice Lau — I Have a Date with Spring**‡; Mavis Fan — The Private Eye Blues; Peter Yung Kam Cheong — The Final Option; Jordan Chan — He's a Woman, She's a Man; Jordan Chan — Twenty Something
**Best Film Editing**: **William Chang, Kwong Chi Leung and Kai Kit Wai** **— Chungking Express**‡; Patrick Tam and Kai Kit Wai — Ashes of Time; Angie Lam — The Rapist; Nick Cheung — Drunken Master II; Chan Ki Hop — The Final Option	**Best Cinematography**: **Christopher Doyle — Ashes of Time**‡; Tony Cheung — One Armed Swordsman '94; Arthur Wong — The Returning; Christopher Doyle and Andrew Lau — Chungking Express; Peter Pau — Treasure Hunt
**Best Art Direction**: **William Chang — Ashes of Time**‡; William Chang — Chungking Express; Pok Yuk Mok — Red Rose White Rose; Yee Chung-Man — He's a Woman, She's a Man; William Chang and Chong Kwok-Wing — The Lovers	**Best Costume Make Up Design**: **William Chang — Ashes of Time**‡; Dora Ng — He's a Woman, She's a Man; Eddie Mok — The Great Conqueror's Concubine; Pok Yuk Mok — Red Rose White Rose; William Chang — The Lovers
**Best Action Direction**: **Lau Ka Leung and Jackie Chan Stunt Team** **— Drunken Master II**‡; Corey Yuen and Yuen Tak — The Bodyguard From Beijing; Sammo Hung — Ashes of Time; Corey Yuen — The New Legend of Shaolin; Yuen Wo Ping — Fist of Legend	**Best Original Film Score**: **Wong Jim, Woo Wai Lap, Mark Lui and Raymond Wong** **— The Lovers**‡; Ann Hui, Chiu Tsang Hei — He's a Woman, She's a Man; Johnny Chen — Red Rose White Rose; Frankie Chan and Roel A. Garcia — Ashes of Time; Frankie Chan and Roel A. Garcia — Chungking Express; Anthony Lee and Marco Wan — I Have A Date With Spring
**Best Original Film Song**: **Composer: Dick Lee • Lyrics: Albert Leung • Singer: Leslie Cheung** **— He's A Woman, She's A Man**‡; Composer: Chan Yiu Chuen • Lyrics: Lee On Sau • Singer: Andy Lau — Tian Di; Composer: Joseph Wong/Clarence Hui • Lyrics: Albert Leung • Singer: Sandy Lam — Twenty Something; Composer: John Laudon • Lyrics: Chan Siu Kei • Singer: Jacky Cheung — The Private Eye Blues; Composer/Lyrics: Johnny Chen • Singer: Sandy Lam — Red Rose White Rose	**Lifetime Achievement**: **Man-lei Wong**‡
**Cantonese Opera Film Century Award**: **Yam Kim Fai**‡

The Chinese Opera Film Century Award was a special award presented at the 14th Hong Kong Film Awards in celebration of 100 years of Chinese opera. The award was dedicated to Cantonese opera actress Yam Kim-fai.

Hong Kong Film Award Chinese Opera Film Century Award
- Awarded for: Celebration of 100 Years Chinese Opera
- Country: Hong Kong
- Presented by: Hong Kong Film Awards
- First award: 1995
