= The Final Option =

The Final Option may refer to:

- The Final Option (1982 film) or Who Dares Wins, a British political thriller film
- The Final Option (1994 film), a Hong Kong action film
- II – The Final Option, a 1993 album by Die Krupps
- Final Option, a 2019 Oregon Files novel by Clive Cussler and Boyd Morrison
