= Final Justice =

Final Justice may refer to:

- Final Justice (1985 film), starring Joe Don Baker and directed by Greydon Clark
- Final Justice (1988 film) (霹雳先锋), Hong Kong film starring Stephen Chow and Danny Lee
- Final Justice (1997 film) (最后判决), Hong Kong film produced by Johnnie To
- Final Justice (1998 film), American television film directed by Tommy Lee Wallace
- Insaaf: The Final Justice, 1997 Indian film
- CMLL Juicio Final (translated as Final Justice), a series of Mexican professional wrestling events
- Final Justice, the eighth book in the Badge of Honor novel series by W.E.B. Griffin
- PC Principal Final Justice, an episode of South Park
