= The Yuppie Fantasia 3 =

2017 Hong Kong film by Lawrence Cheng

- Film poster
- Traditional Chinese: 小男人週記3之吾家有喜
- Simplified Chinese: 小男人周记3之吾家有喜
- Hanyu Pinyin: Xiǎo Nán Rén Zhōu Jì Sān Zhī Wú Jiā Yǒu Xǐ
- Jyutping: Siu2 Naam4 Jan2 Zau1 Gei3 Saam1 Zi1 Ng4 Gaa1 Jau5 Hei2
- Directed by: Lawrence Cheng
- Screenplay by: Lawrence Cheng; Silver Hau; Skipper Cheng
- Based on: The Yuppie Fantasia by: Lawrence Cheng; Chan Hing-ka
- Produced by: Allen Chan
- Starring: Lawrence Cheng; Chrissie Chau; Anthony Chan; Babyjohn Choi; Larine Tang; Hedwig Tam; Louis Cheung; Manfred Wong; Peter Lai; Harriet Yeung
- Cinematography: Suki Yip; Harry Lee
- Edited by: Alan Cheng
- Music by: Kong Fai
- Production company: China 3D Digital Entertainment
- Distributed by: Gala Film Distribution
- Release date: 26 January 2017
- Running time: 93 minutes
- Country: Hong Kong
- Language: Cantonese
- Box office: HK$16,186,955

The Yuppie Fantasia 3 is a 2017 Hong Kong comedy film written, directed by and starring Lawrence Cheng. The film is a sequel to the 1989 film, The Yuppie Fantasia, and the 1990 film, Brief Encounter in Shinjuku. The film was released on 26 January 2017 to celebrate the Chinese New Year, as well as marking the 30th anniversary of the original radio series of the same name created by and starred Cheng in 1986, in which the film franchise was based on.

== Plot ==
Fifty-two year old Leung Foon (Lawrence Cheng) is consciously aware of the three major waves throughout half of his life. First, it was the day his wife, Ann (Carol Cheng), transformed him from a boy to a man. Second, several years later during the day he married Ann and became a henpecked husband. Third, the day when Ann had enough of his incompetence and disappeared with their eight-year-old daughter.

Having experienced these three waves in his life, he converts the grief into strength and transforms from a pity little man to a respected and feared big man. Today, he is a chairman of a listed company well known by those around him. He has learned to resort to every conceivable means to make money. His has enough wealth for his to live stress-free for the rest of his life. However, Foon's biggest regret is that Ann cannot witness his "maturity". However, ever since Foon struck fortune, he was afraid to look at the mirror. For unknown reasons reason, he was afraid to face his own reflection.

When his daughter, Hei-hei (Larine Tang), who is all grown up, returns, another wave strike Foon's life as he does not know how to be a father to an eighteen-year-old beautiful daughter with a 33D breast because in his memory, Hei-hei was only eight years old. Hei-hei's return also changes Foon as he is finally able to face his own reflection because Hei-hei gave him the courage to be young again and act unruly once more.

== Cast ==
- Lawrence Cheng as Leung Foon (梁寬), the main protagonist.
- Chrissie Chau as Bobo, Foon's secretary who later quits her job and becomes his girlfriend.
- Anthony Chan as Wong Fai (王輝), Foon's superior.
- Babyjohn Choi as Wong Ho (王皓), Wong Fai's son who is the owner of an Italian restaurant and gym. He starts out as friends with Hei-hei before becoming her boyfriend.
- Larine Tang as Hui Hei-hei (許喜喜), born Leung Hei-hei (梁喜喜), Foon and Ann's daughter who was taken by her mother to Taiwan at the age of eight and changed to her mother's surname, Hui. Two years ago, she left for the United States for study before returning to Hong Kong after the death of her mother.
- Hedwig Tam as Sam, Hei-hei's friend.
- Louis Cheung as Sam, Wong Fai's subordinate who proclaims himself as Foon's apprentice.
- Manfred Wong as Q Tai-long (Q太郎), Foon and Pierre's longtime friend who is currently a traditional Chinese physician.
- Peter Lai as Pierre (大古惑), Foon and Q Tai-long's longtime friend whose current wife can legally enter into a casino in Macau.
- Harriet Yeung as Faye-Faye (菲菲), Simon's girlfriend.
- Eric Kot as Market security guard
- Calvin Choi as Market stall owner
- Remus Choi as Market stall owner
- Edmond So as Market stall owner
- Julian Cheung as Traffic warden
- Joyce Cheng as June, Wong Fai's ex-mistress
- Ekin Cheng as Bobo suspected ex-boyfriend
- Yuen Yee-man as Ann's double
- Ha Chuk-yan as Connie
- Carmen Tong as Yan
- Cheung Suet-lai as Granny Heung
- Oram Matthew Henry as Daniel
- Elizaveta Gridneva as Daniel's girlfriend
- Nicole Wong as Pierre's granddaughter
- Hillary Liao as Pierre's current wife
- Cheng Nga-chi as Pierre's second wife
- Tsoi Pui-wai as Pierre's third wife
- Lee Wing-man as Waitress
- Wong Che-heung as Granny
- Mark Cheung as Street stall owner
- Lam Tsz-yuen as Street stall owner
- Lee Miu-ping as Street stall owner
- Leung Wai-ching as Street stall owner
- Ng Mei-heung as Street stall owner
- Li Wai-chung as Kid at market
- Cat Lo as Market worker
- Cheng Lai-mui as Market worker
- Chan Cheuk-him as Market administrative worker
- Ho Chun-wing as Market administrative worker
- Lee Ka-kin as Market administrative worker
- Lau Siu-tin as Market administrative worker
- Yan Ngai-to as Market administrative worker
- Kwok Chin-yu as Mall executive
- Li Man-fong as Mall executive
- Lam Kin-sang as Wong Fai's bodyguard
- Herek Wong as Wong Fai's bodyguard
- Lai Sheung-ming as Masseur / cafe staff
- Lam Wai-keung as Gym staff
- Leung Po-shan as Gym staff
- Emil Chan as Gym goer
- Wong Man-pan as Gym goer
- Audrey Chiu as Fat girl at gym
- Luk Wing-kei as Cafe staff
- Wong Chun as Cafe staff
- Chan Ka-leung as Office co-worker
- Gloria Chan as Office co-worker
- Chan Wing-hei as Office co-worker
- Chiu Pik-yu as Office co-worker
- Chow Tsz-ying as Office co-worker
- Vincent Ho as Office co-worker
- Kanice Lau as Office co-worker
- Joan Lee as Office co-worker
- Michael Tam as Office co-worker
- Jarryd Tam as Office co-worker
- Judy Tsang as Office co-worker
- Yu Ying-tung as Office co-worker
- Zaneta Cheng as Office co-worker
- Amanda Cheng as Office co-worker
- Carol Cheng as Ann Hui (許鞍華), Foon's ex-wife who left him a decade ago with the then eight-year-old Hei-hei for Taiwan. Ann moved to the United States two years ago for Hei-hei to further her studies and she died from an accident there. Cheng, who played Ann in the previous installments of the film series, did not participate in the filming for The Yuppie Fantasia 3 since she has retired from acting and as a result, Ann's appearance as a ghost in Foon's hallucinations and memories was created via CGI using footage from the previous installments.

== Music ==
=== Theme song ===
- You, You, You Cause Me to be Shocked (你你你引致我震盪)
  - Composer: Yasuo Sugibayashi, Edward Chan, Cousin Fung
  - Lyricist: Jan Lam (featuring Richard Lam)
  - Arranger: Edward Chan, Cousin Fung
  - Producer: Edward Chan
  - Singer: Jan Lamb

=== Ending theme ===
- Cordial (傾心)
  - Composer: Chris Wong
  - Lyricist: Christopher Wong
  - Singer: Thomas Chan (featuring Lawrence Cheng)

== Reception ==
=== Critical ===
Edmund Lee of the South China Morning Post rated the film score of 3/5 stars and praises Lawrence Cheng's effort in putting heart to the story and notes this third film of the series "ldoesn’t bring disgrace to the brand."

=== Box office ===
The Yuppie Fantasia opened on 26 January 2017 in Hong Kong where grossed HK$8.09 million during its first six days of release, finishing at fifth place during its debut weekend. During its second weekend, the film remained at fifth place where it grossed HK$8.32 million, with a cumulative gross of HK$13.43 million by then. On its third weekend, the film fell down to seventh place where it grossed HK$1.94 million, with a cumulative gross of HK$15.38 million by then. By 14 February 2017, the film has accumulated a total gross of over HK$16 million at the Hong Kong box office. The Yuppie Fantasia 3 grossed a total of HK$16,186,955 at the Hong Kong box office, and is tentatively the fifth-highest grossing domestic film of the territory in 2017.

== Awards and nominations ==
Award	Category	Recipients	Result
37th Hong Kong Film Awards	Best New Performer	Larine Tang	Nominated
