= Cass Phang =

Cantopop singer from Hong Kong

- 彭羚
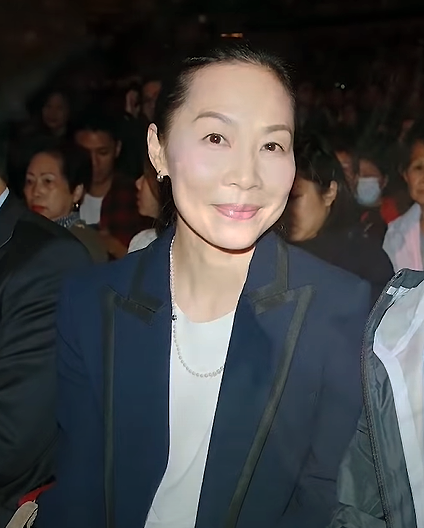
- Phang watching George Lam's "Lamusical 2019 Concert" in Hong Kong Coliseum on 7 May 2019.
- Born: Caspina Phang Yingying (彭映盈); 2 February 1969 (age 57); Ipoh, Perak, Malaysia
- Occupation: Singer
- Years active: 1990–2002
- Spouse: Jan Lamb (m. 1998)
- Children: Jae Wing Lam (daughter) (b. 2000); Ching Lamb (daughter) (b. 2004)

Chinese name
Transcriptions
Standard Mandarin
- Hanyu Pinyin: Péng Líng
Yue: Cantonese
- Jyutping: paang4 ling4
- Musical career
- Origin: Hong Kong
- Genres: Cantopop, Mandopop

Caspina Phang Yingying (Chinese: 彭羚; born 2 February 1969) is a retired Cantopop singer from Hong Kong, affiliated with EMI from 1993 to 1998 and then with Sony Music Entertainment. She was born in Ipoh, Malaysia, studied at Munsang College and a high school in Australia. In September 1998, she married Hong Kong actor and pop singer Jan Lamb, a member of musical rap duo DJ Softhard. She gave birth to two daughters on 14 February 2000 and 28 July 2004.

== Life and career ==
Phang was first spotted as a backing singer for Louis Yuen, and signed to Rock In Records in 1990. In December of that same year she released her debut album, With Love, which included the track Let's Stay Awhile, a cover of Janet Jackson's Let's Wait Awhile. However, it was only with her second album, Love, Pain, I'm Still Waiting (愛過痛過亦願等) that she began to garner some success, when the title song was recognised in the Billboard Awards.

Her third album, Like First Love (彷彿是初戀) was released in 1992. The title song was a cover of Paula Abdul's hugely successful hit, Rush Rush. In 1993 she released her fourth album, SEE FOR CASS, her last album with Rock In Records, which featured her talent for a cappella. During these early years she became known for her sweet voice and wide vocal range.

In 1993, Phang signed to EMI, releasing her fifth album, So Beautiful...To Be With You (有著你...多麼美), which included her first foray into more dance orientated tracks.

In 1994, she released her first compilation Unfinished Novel (未完的小說), which included the new single, Let Me Go With You (讓我跟你走), on which Eric Moo laid down vocals for. This proved to be a huge success, and her breakthrough album. Later the same year she released her first Mandarin language album, My Eyes...My Tears (我的眼．我的淚), intended for the Taiwanese market.

The year 1995 proved to be a pivotal one in her career, with the release of several popular albums, Awakening From A Dream (如夢初醒), Fly With Love (隨愛而飛) and Outside the Window (窗外). The latter album contained her greatest hit to date, All Because of You (完全因你), which was used as the theme song for the movie, The Peace Hotel. During the same year she won several important awards, including the Commercial Radio Ultimate Song Billboard Award Presentation Ceremony's "Best Female Singer"; the RTHK Top Ten Chinese Gold Songs Award Presentation Ceremony's "Ten Most Outstanding Pop Singers" and "Best Selling Female Artist"; Metro Radio Singer Award's "Best Female Singer Gold Award"; and the TVB Jade Solid Gold Award Presentation Ceremony's "Most Popular Female Singer".

In 1996, this saw the launch of her second Mandarin language album, Trapped Bird (囚鳥), and the Cantonese album, Water (清水), which commemorated the 1996 Pat Sin Leng wildfire. She also recorded To Embrace Your Days (抱著你的日子), and performed her first solo concert at the Hong Kong Coliseum.

In 1997, this saw the release of Wet Eyes (眼睛濕濕的) and I Have My World (我有我天地). In 1998, two more albums were released -One Thousand and One Nights (一千零一晚) and True Voice. In September 1998, Cass married fellow DJ singer, Jan Lamb.

In 1999, Phang signed to Sony Music (now known as Sony BMG), and quickly followed with her next album A Flower (一枝花). This marked a turn in her music, from soft ballads to light-hearted, up-beat melodies. The song To The Boys I've Loved (給我愛過的男孩們) came 6th in the Billboard Awards' Ten Best Songs category. In October, she recorded her next Mandarin album, Passionate Love (好好愛), on which she sang a popular duet with Wang Lee-hom. During this year she also announced that she was pregnant with her first child.

On 14 February 2000, her daughter, Jae Wing Lam (林泳) was born. During this time she released her next album, As Beautiful As You Want (要多美麗有多美麗), where she collaborated with Anthony Wong on the song Whirlpool.

In 2001, she became the spokesperson for the Marie France Bodyline, which she shot two advertisements for. Several songs from her following albums, For Lisa (給Lisa) and My... (我的...) were used as theme songs for adverts and movies.

In January 2002, she held her "Cass in the City" concert, and released a tribute album For the Boys (給我唱過的男孩們). The tracks from this record were exclusively covers of hits by male RTHK singers.

A dynamic shift in her career took place when Cass was cast in the role of Teresa Teng, in a musical celebrating the life of the late singing legend. The role was hotly contested, with Sammi Cheng and Faye Wong both interested in the part. The musical opened on 26 July 2002.

In September, Cass released what was to be her last album Precious Moments, which included four new songs and a best of selection. To date she has recorded no further albums.

In 2004, Cass was pregnant again. Originally scheduled to perform at the Hong Kong Arts Festival, she was replaced by fellow Sony solo artist, Candy Lo. On 28 July 2004, she gave birth to the couple's second daughter, Ching Lamb – since then she has made few public appearances. In Jan Lamb's comedy shows, Jan has joked that Cass is busy bringing up the kids, or alternatively that she is the 'manager' of him and their children. Nevertheless, she sometimes makes an appearance on her husband's show.

In February 2012, Cass came out of her semi-retirement by performing for her good friend Wyman Wong at the Wyman Wong Coliseum Exhibition Concert. There was subsequent speculation that she would be returning to the music industry; her manager, Candy Leung, and her husband have both denied this. Cass herself also refused to comment.
