= Option Zero =

1997 Hong Kong film by Dante Lam

- Film poster

Chinese name
- Traditional Chinese: G4特工
- Simplified Chinese: G4特工
Transcriptions
Standard Mandarin
- Hanyu Pinyin: G4 Té Gōng
Yue: Cantonese
- Jyutping: G4 Dak6 Gung1
- Directed by: Dante Lam
- Written by: Chan Hing Ka
- Produced by: Gordon Chan; John Chong
- Starring: Julian Cheung; Anthony Wong; Carmen Lee; Monica Chan; Michael Wong
- Cinematography: Horace Wong
- Edited by: Chan Kei Hop
- Music by: Shigeru Umebayashi
- Production company: Media Asia Films
- Distributed by: Media Asia Distributions
- Release date: 27 November 1997
- Running time: 128 minutes
- Country: Hong Kong
- Language: Cantonese
- Box office: HK$6,373,420

Option Zero is a 1997 Hong Kong action film produced by Gordon Chan and John Chong and featuring the directorial debut of Dante Lam. This film is a sequel to 1994's The Final Option and 1996's First Option. Film stars Julian Cheung, Anthony Wong, Carmen Lee, Monica Chan and guest stars Michael Wong, the star of the first two installments.

== Cast ==
- Julian Cheung as Ben Chan
- Anthony Wong as Sing
- Carmen Lee as Kelly
- Monica Chan as Monica Leung
- Michael Wong as G4 trainer
- Ching Fung as Kim Chong Yat
- Nancy Lan as Amy
- Cheung Hung On as Chi
- Farini Cheung as Grace
- Joseph Cheung as Joe
- Michael Tong as Michael
- Lee Yue Lung as arm dealer
- Roderick Lam as Jim
- John Chan as John
- Andrew Chan as G4 team leader
- Leitao Mario De Meio as G4 team leader
- Roger Woo as G4 assistant trainer
- Rocks Chik as G4 member
- Vincent Chik as G4 member
- Ho Siu Hang as G4 member
- Michael Lam as SB member
- Eddie Che as SB/G4 member Yan
- Luk Man Wai as SB/G4 member
- Dick Tung as furniture mover
- Gary Mak as Lung
- Paul Cheng as model shop boss
- Wong Kin as Photographer Kin
- Jimmy Shin as Korean Hitman
- Lawrence Cheng
- Vincent Kok

== Box office ==
This film grossed HK$6,373,420 during its theatrical run from 27 November to 22 December 1997 in Hong Kong.
