= Lawrence Cheng =

Hong Kong actor and filmmaker (born 1954)

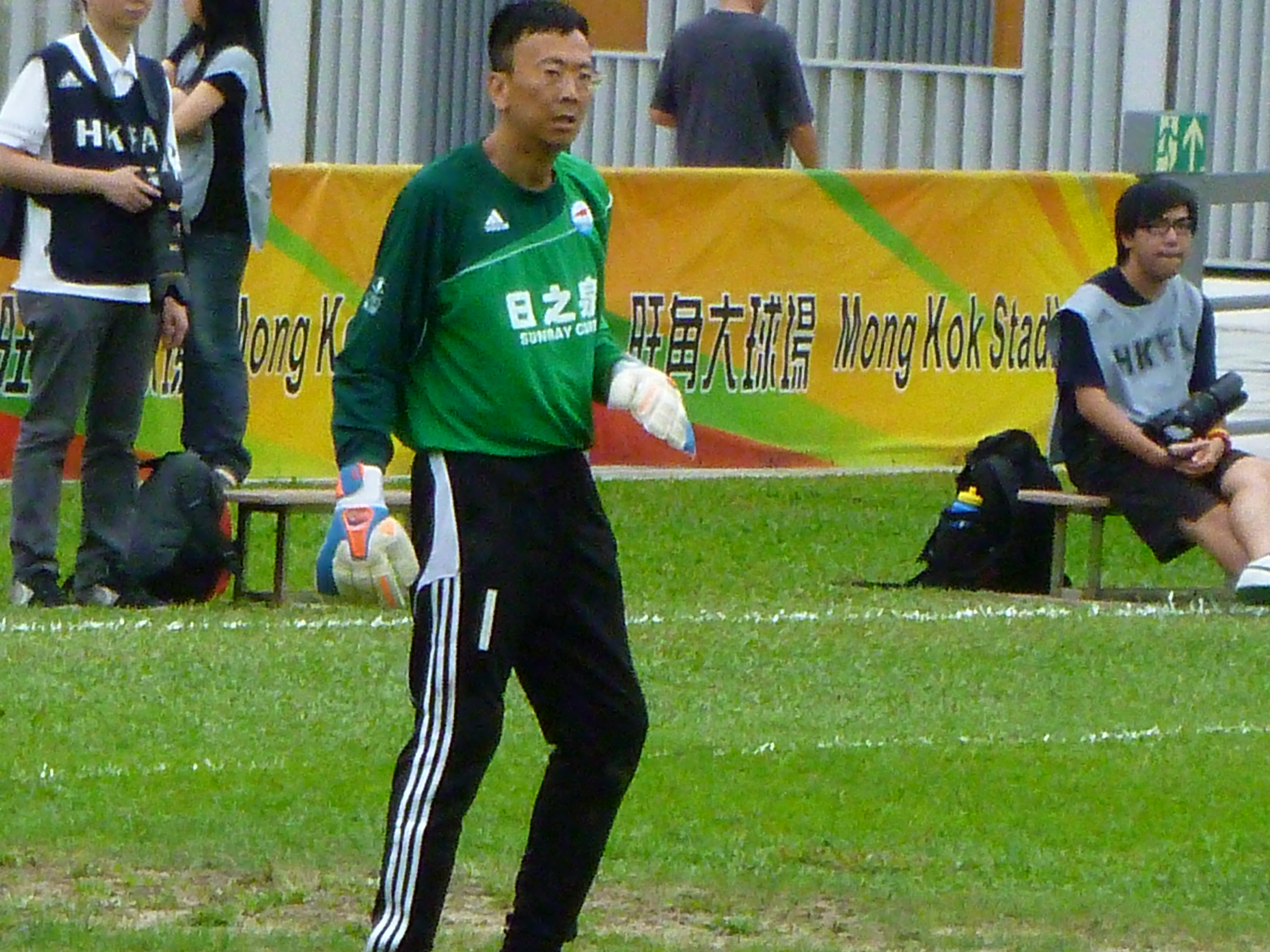
- Cheng in 2012
- Born: 27 November 1955 (age 70); Hong Kong
- Years active: 1976–present

Chinese name
- Traditional Chinese: 鄭丹瑞
- Simplified Chinese: 郑丹瑞
Transcriptions
Standard Mandarin
- Hanyu Pinyin: Zhéng Dánrúi
Yue: Cantonese
- Jyutping: zeng6 daan1 seoi6
- Musical career
- Also known as: Ah Tan (阿旦)

Lawrence Cheng Tan-shui (born 27 November 1955) is a Hong Kong film actor, director, screenwriter, producer, and master of ceremonies. He was a Hong Kong DJ and radio channel executive.

Cheng became famous after he created the radio drama series The Yuppie Fantasia (小男人週記) in 1986 which he also starred in. In 1989, he starred in the film adaptation of the series which was directed by Gordon Chan and became a box office hit.

== Early life ==
Cheng was born in Hong Kong on 27 November 1954. His family is from Huizhou (惠州市), Guangdong Province. He attended secondary school in St. Paul's College and then went to Hong Kong Baptist University, the top broadcasting school in Hong Kong, and graduated in 1978.

== Acting career ==
After graduating from the Baptist College in 1978, Cheng immediately joined Reddifusion Television's Creative Department where he worked on numerous popular television series. He later joined ATV and became a Creative Director. He switched from a TV personality to a radio producer and DJ in 1984 when he joined RTHK. In 1987, he made his return to television when he joined TVB. At TVB, he was a variety show host, and acted in many dramas.

His film career started in 1980, however his breakout role was in The Yuppie Fantasia in 1989, which was a box office hit grossing US $2 million. Aside from being an actor, he is also a director, producer and screenwriter.

Cheng currently hosts variety shows as a freelancer for TVB, ATV, now TV Hong Kong Channel, feature Race Meetings and Events for The Hong Kong Jockey Club and acts in a few dramas. He also acts as supporting actor in Hong Kong films.

In January 2011, he suffered from a burst lung whilst playing football.

== Filmography ==
=== Films ===
Year	Title	Chinese Title	Role
1980	Encore	喝采	Actor writer
1980	The Desperados	籠裡雞	Writer
1981	The Third Hand	第三隻手	Actor
1981	One Heart One Spirit	童軍樂	Actor
1981	Family of Lust	代代風流代代春	Actor
1982	Hell Has No Boundary	魔界	Assistant Director writer
1983	The Drummer	鼓手	Actor
1983	Red Panther	害時出世	"Kiang"
1983	Twinkle Twinkle Little Star	星際鈍胎	Writer
1984	Behind the Yellow Line	緣份	"café captain" writer
1984	My Darling Genie	我愛神仙遮	Writer
1985	Seven Angels	歡場	"night club patron"
1985	Love with the Perfect Stranger	錯點鴛鴦	"Ah Tan"
1985	Friendly Ghost	老友鬼鬼	Actor
1985	Carry On Doctors and Nurses	天使出更	"Nurse Tan"
1987	Happy Bigamist	一屋兩妻	"Shin's colleague"
1987	Wonder Women	神奇兩女俠	"Tan"
1988	Heart to Hearts	三人世界	"Alex's friend at party"
1988	The Eighth Happiness	八星報喜	"Beautiful's boyfriend"
1988	Profiles of Pleasure	群鶯亂舞	"Tall Kao"
1988	Ghost in the House	吉屋藏嬌	"Ging Goh"
1988	Couples, Couples, Couples	三對鴛鴦一張床	"John's friend in lounge"
1988	Mother Vs Mother	南北媽打	"Man on bus with Xi"
1989	Miracles	奇蹟	"Daily Sun Reporter"
1989	The Romancing Star III	精裝追女仔之3狼之一族	"Lo Ka-ling"
1989	Happy Together	相見好	"Robert"
1989	In Between Loves	求愛夜驚魂	"Chin Cheng"
1989	The Bachelor's Swan Song	再見王老五	"Tan"
1989	The Yuppie Fantasia	小男人周記	"Leung Foon"
1989	Little Cop	小小小警察	"Representative of Cruelty Against Animal"
1990	Brief Encounter in Shinjuku	錯在新宿	"Leung Foon" producer
1990	A Tale from the East	漫畫奇俠	"Dunn, the conductor of HK Youth Orchestra"
1990	Shanghai, Shanghai	亂世兒女	"Chan Tai-man"
1990	The Fun, the Luck & the Tycoon	吉星拱照	"Jimmy Chiu"
1991	Alien Wife	我老婆唔係人	"Priest"; Planning
1991	Finale in Blood	大鬧廣昌隆	"Cheng Ming Pau"
1991	Inspector Pink Dragon	神探馬如龍	"Ma Yue-lung"
1992	Game Kids	機Boy小子之真假威龍	"Gay Shop Manager"
1992	Freedom Run Q	太子爺出差	"Albert"
1992	She Starts the Fire	噴火女郎	"Charles Siu" director
1992	King of Beggars	武狀元蘇乞兒	"Professor"
1992	Never Ending Summer	吳三桂與陳園園	"Chan Tai-yuen"
1993	The Eight Hilarious Gods	笑八仙	"Uncle Cheung"
1993	He Ain't Heavy, He's My Father	新難兄難弟	"Ko Lo-chuen" / "Siu-lung (adult)"
1993	Murder	黃蜂尾後針	"Chu Chung-hong" director writer Story
1993	Tom, Dick and Hairy	風塵三俠	"Hairy/Giorgio Mao"
1994	The True Hero	暴雨驕陽	"Joe"
1994	He & She	姊妹情深	"Martin Cheng Sai-kit" director writer Story
1994	The Modern Love	新男歡女愛	Actor
1994	He's a Woman, She's a Man	金枝玉葉	"Charles Chow Chu"
1995	Heaven Can't Wait	救世神棍	"Hui Chi-on"
1995	Romantic Dream	追女仔95之綺夢	"Leung Hoi"
1995	The Meaning of Life	搶閘媽咪	"Lam Chi Wing"
1997	Those Were the Days	精裝難兄難弟	"Ko Lo-chuen"
1997	Option Zero	G4特工	Actor
1998	The Storm Riders	風雲─雄霸天下	"Jester/Man Chow Chow"
2001	Born Wild	野獸之瞳	"Sandy's eye doctor"
2002	The Eye	見鬼	Producer
2003	Truth or Dare: 6th Floor Rear Flat	六樓后座	"Jason (voice only)" producer writer Story; Planning
2003	Golden Chicken 2	金雞2	"Fortune Teller"
2004	Six Strong Guys	六壯士	"Lawrence" producer Story
2004	The Eye 2	見鬼2	Producer; Story
2004	Koma	救命	Producer
2005	Bug Me Not!	虫不知	"Hyland's dad"
2005	Mob Sister	阿嫂	"Boss Wang" producer
2005	The Eye 10	見鬼10	Producer
2005	Home Sweet Home	怪物	Producer
2006	Cocktail	半醉人間	"Tsuen"
2007	Simply Actors	戲王之王	"Tourist watching window cleaner"
2008	Ocean Flame	一半海水，一半火焰	"Yau's blackmailed victim"
2008	Happy Funeral	六樓后座2 家屬謝禮	Producer; Story
2010	Break Up Club	分手說愛你	Himself producer writer
2010	The Stool Pigeon	綫人	"Cher's friend"
2010	Perfect Wedding	抱抱俏佳人	Producer; Writer; Story
2010	Bruce Lee, My Brother	李小龍	"Ko Lo-chuen"
2011	Hi, Fidelity	出軌的女人	"Mr. Ho"
2011	Lan Kwai Fong	喜愛夜蒲	
2011	The Allure of Tears	傾城之淚	"Xiao Dan"; Producer; Writer
2012	Vulgaria	低俗喜劇	"Professor Cheng"
2013	Bends	過界	"Leo"
2014	Break Up 100	分手100次	"Policeman"; Director; Producer; Writer
2015	Lost in Hong Kong	港囧	"Host of art exhibition"
2015	Wong Ka Yan	王家欣	Actor
2015	Super Models	色模	Actor
2016	29+1		Actor
2017	The Yuppie Fantasia 3	小男人週記3之吾家有喜	"Leung Foon"; Director; Screenwriter
2017	77 Heartbreaks		
2017	The Sinking City - Capsule Odyssey		
2018	Agent Mr Chan		
2018	When Sun Meets Moon		
2019	A Home with a View		
2019	77 Heartwarmings		

=== TVB dramas ===
Year	Title	Chinese Title	Role
1993	Man of Wisdom	金牙大狀	"Tai Ah-tau"
1995	Man of Wisdom II	金牙大狀 II	"Tai Ah-tau"
1997	A Road and a Will	香港人在廣州	"Sam Yue"
2004	Sunshine Heartbeat	赤沙印記@四葉草.2	"Yip Shu-ko"
2006	Welcome to the House	高朋滿座	"Ko Yau-pang"
2014	Never Dance Alone	女人俱樂部	"Wong Kwok-leung"
2021	Fraudstars	欺詐集團	"Herman Cheng Kwok-cheung"

=== ViuTV dramas ===
Year	Title	Chinese Title	Role
2022	Into the Wild	野人老師	"Raymond"

=== Shaw Brother dramas ===
Year	Title	Chinese Title	Role
2020	The Impossible 3	非凡三俠	"Keung Ching"

=== Television shows ===
Year	Title	Network	Role
2022-2023	What Happens To Our Body	RTHK TV 31	Host

== See also ==
- Cinema of Hong Kong
