= Love in the Time of Twilight =

1995 Hong Kong film by Tsui Hark

- Theatrical release poster
- Traditional Chinese: 花月佳期
- Hanyu Pinyin: huā yuè jiā qí
- Directed by: Tsui Hark
- Screenplay by: Sharon Hui; Tsui Hark
- Produced by: Tsui Hark
- Starring: Nicky Wu; Charlie Yeung
- Cinematography: Peter Pau
- Edited by: Marco Mak
- Music by: Raymond Wong
- Production companies: Film Workshop; Paragon Films Ltd.
- Distributed by: Golden Harvest Productions
- Release date: 13 April 1995; (Hong Kong)
- Running time: 103 minutes
- Country: Hong Kong
- Language: Cantonese
- Box office: HK$5,126,023

Love in the Time of Twilight (Chinese: 花月佳期; pinyin: huā yuè jiā qí), also known as 電線桿有鬼 (literally "The Lamppost Is Haunted"), is a 1995 Hong Kong fantasy romantic comedy film directed by Tsui Hark. The film reunites lead actors Nicky Wu and Charlie Yeung, who had previously starred in Tsui Hark's 1994 film The Lovers.

== Plot ==
In the time leading up to the matchmaking day Affinity Day, struggling single stage actress Yan-Yan is annoyed and bothered multiple times by the single Kong Gai-Wai and the two become enemies. Cheung Siu-Ying gives Gai Wai a box she claims is full of expensive jewellery from her father's collection to take to the bank, but he is unwittingly tricked into carrying guns to the bank for a robbery, after which he is strangled by the power line of a lamppost. He returns as a ghost to ask Yan-Yan to travel back in time to help him. She encounters difficulty and must repeatedly revisit their previous encounters multiple times in an attempt to make the two enemies fall in love and change their fates.

== Cast ==
- Nicky Wu as Kong Gai-Wai
- Charlie Yeung as Yan-Yan
- Eric Kot as Little Shrimp
- Ting Chang as Cheung Siu-Yung
- Ho Ka-kui as Devil King
- Kai Cheung-lung
- Lai Bei-dak as Magician
- Lau Shun as Yan-Yan's Father
- Lee Wai-man
- Andy Tse
- Wong Yat-fei as Theater Manager

== Production ==
The martial arts director was Yuen Bun.

== Release ==
The film had a theatrical run in Hong Kong from 13 to 26 April 1995, earning HK$5,126,023.

== Reception ==
Reviewer Joey O'Bryan of the Austin Chronicle gave the film 3 out of 5 stars, writing, "Needless to say, despite Hark's colorful direction, some nifty effects work, and the enthusiastic performances given by the two leads, Love in the Time of Twilight won't please everyone; it's simply too oddball and silly a mixture, but it is packed with lots of unpredictability and charm, and should serve as a nice diversion for Hong Kong film buffs."

In his book Planet Hong Kong: Popular Cinema and the Art of Entertainment, author David Bordwell wrote, "Love in the Time of Twilight showcased Nicky Wu and Charlie Young, two pop singers who had been successful in Tsui's costume romance The Lovers (1994). Instead of making a carbon copy, he set himself new problems in storytelling and special effects. [...] The special effects are handled adroitly, but Tsui is chiefly interested in piling up misunderstandings to a height unattempted in Hollywood movies. His lovers from the future quarrel with their earlier selves and adopt disguises that confuse each other. In a fit of anger the gangster, heedless of the consequences, tries to kill his past self. The confusion culminates in a hide-andseek chase in the theater involving all three pairs of doubles, each one ignorant of the whole situation. Folding in upon itself again and again, Love in the Time of Twilight is Tsui's effort to beat Hollywood time-travel comedy at its own game."

Reviewer Andrew Saroch of fareastfilms.com gave the film a rating of 3.5 out of 5 stars, writing, "Thankfully Charlie Yeung is wonderful as Yan – charming and totally engrossing – while Nicky Wu is a perfect foil as the more serious Kong; these two superb performers help the viewer to forgive the early problems. ‘Love In The Time Of Twilight’ is still a good film that nearly rises to be a fine one – it's recommended despite this fact."

Reviwer Kozo of lovehkfilm.com called the film a "Dizzyingly paced romantic fantasy from Tsui Hark that features a truly bizarre series of plot devices and a sometimes confusing narrative. It's also an engaging, creative motion picture that can be exhilarating and quite enjoyable."

Reviewer Stephen Teo of filmcritics.org.hk called it a "Typically lush, over-produced piece of flummery from Tsui Hark", concluding that it is "Compulsively idiosyncratic and eclectic (the film crosses Hong Kong ghost movies with Hollywood's digitally-animated special effects productions) but put together with the usual Tsui Hark panache."

The review of the film on sogoodreviews.com reads, "Tsui throws buckets of weirdness at us including fairly extensive but rough use of CG [...], situation comedy, situation comedy involving lots of projectile vomit, Eric Kot being annoying like only Eric Kot can, frankly creepy after life-esque imagery, time travel and an insanely funny or maybe serious comment on the development of technology during this era. It all adds up to a wild time and only a movie that can come from the imaginative mind of Tsui Hark."

A review by Sean Gilman on The Chinese Cinema reads, "Love in the Time of Twilight should be seen more. At the time of this writing, it doesn't even have a wikipedia page". The review continues, "It might be the best of Tsui Hark's three films from 1995. Has any director had a year with so many films that were so different from each other?" Remarking on the unusual plot, Gilman wrote, "no matter how crazy Tsui's narratives become, they are always grounded in clear (even basic) emotional drives. His people make sense even if their worlds do not." On the website seattlescreentime.com, Gilman called the film a "mid-90s classic".

Variety called the film one of Tsui Hark's "flops".

== Accolades ==
The musical score by Wu Wai-lap and Raymond Wong was nominated for the Hong Kong Film Award for Best Original Film Score at the 15th Hong Kong Film Awards.
