= Brief Encounter in Shinjuku =

1990 Hong Kong film by Gordon Chan

- Blu-ray disc cover
- Traditional Chinese: 錯在新宿
- Simplified Chinese: 错在新宿
- Hanyu Pinyin: Cuò Zài Xīn Sù
- Jyutping: Co3 Zoi6 San1 Seok1
- Directed by: Gordon Chan
- Screenplay by: Gordon Chan; Nip Wang-fung; Cheung Siu-han; Wong Heung
- Based on: The Yuppie Fantasia by: Lawrence Cheng; Chan Hing-ka
- Produced by: Lawrence Cheng; Chua Lam
- Starring: Lawrence Cheng; Carol Cheng; Rosamund Kwan
- Cinematography: Derek Wan
- Edited by: Chan Kei-hop
- Music by: Lowell Lo
- Production companies: Golden Harvest; People's Production
- Distributed by: Golden Harvest
- Release date: 16 February 1990
- Running time: 85 minutes
- Country: Hong Kong
- Language: Cantonese
- Box office: HK$9,642,962

Brief Encounter in Shinjuku is a 1990 Hong Kong comedy film written and directed by Gordon Chan, produced by and starring Lawrence Cheng and a sequel to the 1989 film, The Yuppie Fantasia. The film was later followed by another sequel, The Yuppie Fantasia 3, which was released in 2017.

== Plot ==
Leung Foon (Lawrence Cheng), Q Tai-long (Manfred Wong) and Pierre (Peter Lai) bring their wives/female companions to a trip sailing in the sea. Halfway during their trip, Ann (Carol Cheng) encounters her ex-boyfriend, Alan (Allan Fung). Alan is a Médecins Sans Frontières who has been stationed in Africa. Alan intended to invite Ann to Africa but was rejected. Ann also rejects her superior, KK Yeung's (Eric Yeung) offer to immigrate and work in Australia and decides to reconcile with Foon.

Foon and Q Tai-long transfers to a new company where they meet new secretary Wendy Wan (Rosamund Kwan). Leung's boss, Mr. Tsang (Kenneth Tsang), assigns Foon and Wendy to a business trip in Shinjuku, Japan. After the two arrive in Shinjuku, they realised they have forgotten to bring their proposal and had to work all night in the hotel where Wendy eventually becomes exhausted and falls asleep. The next day while meeting their client, Foon presents an outstanding performances which attracts Wendy. The two go out for shopping afterwards where Wendy gets on the wrong tram ride and Foon rushes to rescue her. Foon nearly spent all his cash on taxi rides to find Wendy and they eventually use a credit card for a final ride back to their hotel. Back at the hotel, they get intimate with one another and make love. The next day, the two make a call back to Hong Kong informing their boss that they have not yet completed their assignment and must stay for one more day as an excuse for them to spend a sweet day in Tokyo.

After the two return to Hong Kong, their intimate relationship becomes gradually exposed. Finally, at the wedding of Wendy and her boyfriend, John Li (Lee Chung-ling), Foon arrives late and trips at the door which causes his fingerprints to be printed on Wendy and John's marriage certificate. Foon also admits to Ann about what happened to Ann and was kicked out by Ann as a result. Foon later receives a call from Wendy to meet at the outside of the Legislative Council building. There, Wendy tells Foon that she told John about their intimate relationship which John is unable to accept and helplessly left him. She also tells Foon that she will keep the marriage certificate since it has Foon's fingerprints on it.

On the other, because Q Tai-long became involved with Pierre's girlfriend, Fanny (Vindy Chan), his wife, Fung (Leila Chow), leaves him and their son. During one occasion when Foon, Pierre and Q Ta-long were eating instant noodles at the latter's home, Fung returns to cook dinner for them and stating that she is doing it for her son and Q Tai-long is overjoyed. At this time, Foon is also determined to reconcile and repair his relationship with Ann.

== Cast ==
- Lawrence Cheng as Leung Foon (梁寬), the main protagonist
- Carol Cheng as Ann Hui (許鞍華), Foon's wife
- Rosamund Kwan as Wendy Wan (溫敏儀), Foon's new colleague whom he is involved in an intimate relationship
- Manfred Wong as Q Tai-long (Q太郎), Foon's friend
- Leila Chow as Fung (阿鳳), Q Tai-long's wife
- Peter Lai as Pierre (大古惑), Foon's friend
- Kenneth Tsang as Mr. Tsang (曾先生), Foon's new boss
- Allan Fung as Allan, Ann's ex-boyfriend
- Eric Yeung as KK Yeung (KK楊), Ann's boss
- Lee Chung-ling as John Li (李寧), a dentist who is Wendy's boyfriend
- Chang Kan-wing as Marriage Registrar
- Vindy Chan as Fanny, Pierre's girlfriend
- Eric Kot as Flower delivery boy
- Jan Lamb as Fluffy toy delivery boy
- John Cheung as Office worker
- Lee Wah-kon

== Theme song ==
- No Regret (無憾)
  - Composer: Lowell Lo
  - Lyricist: Calvin Poon
  - Singer: Sandy Lam

== Reception ==
=== Critical ===
So Good Reviews gave the film a mixed review noting its examination of characters as step down from its previous installment, but still compliments director Gordon Chan's effort in portraying conflicts in a serious manner.

=== Box office ===
The film grossed HK$9,642,962 at the Hong Kong box office during its theatrical run from 16 February to 14 March 1990.
