= Oh! My Three Guys =

1994 Hong Kong film by Derek Chiu

- Film poster
- Traditional Chinese: 三個相愛的少年
- Simplified Chinese: 三个相爱的少年
- Hanyu Pinyin: Sān Gè Xiàng Ài Dé Shǎo Nián
- Jyutping: Saam1 Go3 Seong1 Ngoi3 Dik1 Siu3 Nin4
- Directed by: Derek Chiu
- Screenplay by: Raymond To
- Produced by: Charine Chan
- Starring: Eric Kot; Lau Ching-wan; Dayo Wong; Jacklyn Wu; Charine Chan; Noel Chik
- Cinematography: Tam Chi-wai
- Edited by: Cheung Kwok-kuen
- Music by: Tats Lau
- Production company: Regal Films
- Distributed by: Golden Harvest
- Release date: 1 December 1994
- Running time: 96 minutes
- Country: Hong Kong
- Language: Cantonese
- Box office: HK$9,458,839

Oh! My Three Guys is a 1994 Hong Kong comedy drama film directed by Derek Chiu and starring Eric Kot, Lau Ching-wan and Dayo Wong. The film tells the story of three gay young men portrayed by Kot, Lau and Wong.

== Plot ==
Good friends Kau, Hoi and Fa are homosexual men. Hoi works in an advertising firm while Kau and Fa have not found a suitable job yet. Hoi's new female colleague Mei became interested in him. When Mei found out that Hoi was gay, she did not discriminate him and was determined to help him return to normal. At that time, Kau was infected with AIDS and one time during a TV interview, he suddenly fell unconscious. Hoi and Fa was eager to make the last days of Kau happy, they organized a masquerade for him. After the masquerade, Kau committed suicide and Hoi quit his job after his homosexual identity was exposed.

== Cast ==
- Eric Kot as Kau Ku-neung
- Lau Ching-wan as Ching Yu-hoi
- Dayo Wong as Fa
- Jacklyn Wu as Fok Mei
- Charine Chan as Bitchy Air Hostess
- Noel Chik as Nancy
- Simon Lui as Donald
- Joseph Cheng as Toby
- Kenneth Chan as Mike
- Anthony Wong as Best Actor Winner
- Manfred Wong as Head Writer
- Yip Hon-leung as Mr. Chan
- Jerry Koo
- Nelson Cheung
- Wong Yat-fei as Chan Yiu-cho
- Wong Wa-wo
- John Cheung as Mr. Ho Yun-cheung

== Box office ==
The film grossed HK$9,458,839 at the Hong Kong box office during its theatrical run from 1 December 1994 to 20 January 1995 in Hong Kong.
