= Knock Off (film) =

1998 action film directed by Tsui Hark

- Theatrical release poster

Chinese name
- Traditional Chinese: 迎頭痛擊
- Simplified Chinese: 迎头痛击
Transcriptions
Standard Mandarin
- Hanyu Pinyin: Yíng Tóu Tòng Jī
Yue: Cantonese
- Jyutping: Jing^{4} Tau^{4} Tung^{3} Gik^{1}
- Directed by: Tsui Hark
- Written by: Steven E. de Souza
- Produced by: Nansun Shi; Moshe Diamant
- Starring: Jean-Claude Van Damme; Rob Schneider; Lela Rochon; Michael Fitzgerald Wong; Carmen Lee; Paul Sorvino
- Cinematography: Arthur Wong
- Edited by: Marco Mak
- Music by: Ron Mael; Russell Mael
- Production companies: TriStar Pictures; MDP Worldwide; Film Workshop
- Distributed by: Sony Pictures Releasing
- Release dates: May 27, 1998 (Philippines); September 4, 1998 (U.S.); September 10, 1998 (H.K.)
- Running time: 90 minutes
- Countries: United States; Hong Kong
- Language: English
- Budget: $35 million
- Box office: $44.1 million

Knock Off (Chinese: 迎頭痛擊) is a 1998 action film directed by Tsui Hark and starring Jean-Claude Van Damme, their second collaboration following Double Team (1997). The American and Hong Kong co-production co-stars Rob Schneider, Lela Rochon, Michael Wong, Carman Lee and Paul Sorvino. Set against the backdrop of the 1997 handover of Hong Kong, the film is about a fashion executive (Van Damme) who uncovers a conspiracy involving counterfeit goods.

The film is also the second collaboration between Van Damme and Steven E. de Souza, the first film being Street Fighter, released in 1994. The title is a double entendre, as the term colloquially refers to both counterfeit goods as well as targeted killing.

Knock Off released in the United States by Sony Pictures Releasing on September 4, 1998. It received mostly negative reviews, though some critics praised the action sequences and Hark's visuals.

== Plot ==
Hong Kong, June 1997. On the eve of the handover ceremony, Russian mobsters searching for something underwater find a crate as police close in. They accidentally open the crate and baby dolls float to the surface before exploding.

Downtown, Tommy Hendricks is arranging a fashion show for "V-Six" Jeans. His partner, Marcus Ray shows up late after inspecting a warehouse of their goods where he sees several knock-offs, including the exploding dolls, peddled by a triad, Skinny Wang. Marcus and Tommy then participate in a rickshaw race during which Marcus' adopted brother and friend Eddie Wang (Skinny's brother) cheats to win by switching with a body double. The body double gets kidnapped by the Russians (looking for Eddie) and Marcus gives chase. Ultimately, they kill the fake Eddie and Hong Kong police led by Inspector Han arrest Marcus and Tommy, but release them without charges.

Back at their office, an executive from V-Six, Karen Lee claims a shipment of jeans was counterfeit and Marcus and Tommy are responsible for over $5 million of losses. She agrees to let it go if they go to the warehouse that switched the fake jeans and identify who did it. Meanwhile, the Russian bosses kill the agents who failed to retrieve the dolls and get tipped off by Skinny that V-Six is onto them and is going to their warehouse. When Tommy gets kidnapped at a restaurant, Marcus follows him and finds him talking to his CIA handlers. He is a CIA agent sent to discover the counterfeiters who used Marcus, "the king of knock offs," as his cover.

That night, before they arrive at the warehouse, a truck bursts out. Marcus gets on top of it and when it ultimately crashes they find it full of tiny discs. Tommy's boss, Harry Johansson determines they are powerful "nanobombs" at their base inside The Big Buddha. Believing Eddie to be in on it, they go to see him. Eddie fingers Skinny as the counterfeiter; he found out they had bombs in the merchandise and tried to have it dumped in the ocean before the Russians found them. He opens a safe to give them proof, but it explodes, killing him. Tommy and Marcus have to fight their way out of the building. Tommy obtains security footage on the way out.

Marcus kidnaps Skinny and takes him back to the CIA base. There, the security footage reveals Karen was in the warehouse just before they were. At the office, she handcuffs Tommy and prepares to question him. After Marcus leaves, the Buddha explodes, and Marcus races to the office to save Tommy. After a fight, she reveals she's CIA as well, and the three team up. While Marcus changes, the Russians kidnap Karen and Tommy, and Marcus finds a bomb detector in Karen's things. He realizes the jean studs are the nanobombs and checks the computer for the shipping manifest. He and Inspector Han race to the cargo ship where Karen and Tommy are being held.

Tommy is relieved to see Harry on board, but Harry reveals he is a double agent intending to ransom companies for not detonating the nanobombs they have been secretly planting in manufactured goods all over the world. Marcus and the detective board the barge and fight through all of the Russians, eventually escaping just before Harry detonates it. Karen plants a handful of the nanobombs on Harry's boat as well, which explodes. They find the detonator in the water and take it.

Two hours later, Tommy and Marcus talk in a bar. Tommy still has the detonator. In a distant room, Harry, still alive, is planting nanobombs on a toy. Tommy carelessly activates the detonator, destroying the building Harry is in, in the distance.

== Cast ==
- Jean-Claude Van Damme as Marcus Ray
- Rob Schneider as Tommy Hendricks
- Lela Rochon as Karen Lee
- Michael Wong as Inspector Han
- Paul Sorvino as Harry Johansson
- Carman Lee as Ling Ho
- Wyman Wong as Eddie Wang
- Glen Chin as Skinny Wang
- Wes Wolff as Dinger
- Moses Chan as Officer Wong
- Ray Nicholas as Karl
- Jeff Wolfe as Skaar
- Michael Miller as Tickler
- Steve Brettingham as Hawkeye
- Mark Houghton as Bear
- Peter Nelson as Biff
- Kim Maree Penn as Chip
- Thomas Hudak as Kyle
- Steve Nation as Kip
- Dennis Chan Kwok-sun as Choy
- William Chow as Papa Wang
- Kent Osborne as Pachy
- Duane Davis as Roy
- Stuart Kavanagh as Colonel Carrington

== Production ==
=== Casting ===
According to Mike Leeder, the role of Inspector Han was originally meant for Tsui Hark's regular collaborator Jet Li, but he declined in order to play the villain in Lethal Weapon 4.

=== Filming ===
Shooting took place mainly in Hong Kong during the summer of 1997, though some of the water-set action sequences were shot in the Philippines due to security concerns with the actual handover ceremony. The film is one of the last in the world to feature Kai Tak Airport still in use; the airport closed in 1998. Sammo Hung was the second unit director on the film.

=== Music ===
The film’s music was credited to Ron and Russell Mael of American new wave band Sparks. In an interview with historian and critic Aaron Hillis, they noted that, although they maintained a positive friendship with Tsui Hark through their attempts to produce a film adaptation of Mai, the Psychic Girl, due to studio pressure the score ultimately ended up being more the work of additional music composer Varouje Hagopian than them.

== Release ==
The film was announced at the 1997 American Film Market. It was released in the United States on September 4, 1998 by Sony Pictures Releasing.

== Reception ==
=== Box office ===
Knock Off opened in the United States on September 4, 1998. It took the 4th spot and grossed in $5,516,2311 at 1800 theaters, at an average of $3,064 for the weekend. From there it grossed a total of $10.3 million in US ticket sales.

=== Critical response ===
Knock Off holds a 9% approval rating on Rotten Tomatoes based on 43 reviews. The site's consensus states: "Muddled plot; stiff acting." Audiences polled by CinemaScore gave the film an average grade of "D+" on an A+ to F scale.

Joe Leydon of Variety called it "an exuberantly cheesy action opus" that is made worth watching by Tsui Hark's directing despite its confusing and formulaic plot. Paul Tatara of CNN wrote that it is "the most incomprehensible mess I've ever had to sit through", and Jeff Vice of the Deseret News called it "incompetent in almost every aspect of filmmaking". Kevin Thomas of the Los Angeles Times, however, called it Van Damme's best film to date and said it has crossover appeal due to its humor.

In a retrospective review for Mubi, Jonah Jeng writes "Featuring dense, frenetic plotting and an even denser, more frenetic visual style, the film taps the widespread feeling of instability, of accelerating toward uncertain futures. The zany and convoluted nature of the narrative is matched on a scene-to-scene, often moment-to-moment basis via convulsive bursts of broad comedy..... Action scenes sometimes feel like borderline avant-garde catalogs of film techniques, oscillating wildly between slow motion, undercranking, superimposition, freeze frames, discontinuous shocks of color, and delirious flights of special effects spectacle."

As of 2026, Knock Off is Hark's second and last American film; he returned to Hong Kong after Knock Off, feeling unsatisfied with his work in the United States.
