= Carman Lee =

Hong Kong actress (born 1966)

- 李若彤
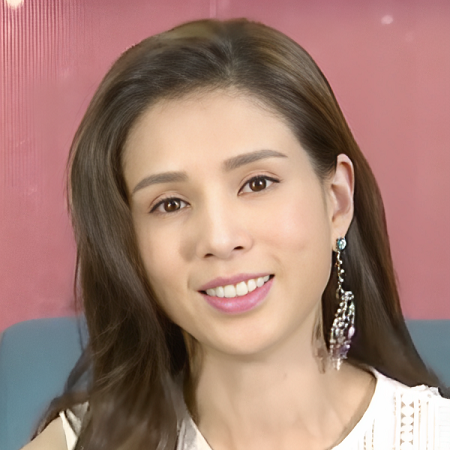
- Lee in 2019
- Born: 16 August 1966 (age 58); British Hong Kong
- Occupation: Actress

Chinese name
- Chinese: 李若彤
Transcriptions
Standard Mandarin
- Hanyu Pinyin: Lǐ Ruòtóng
Yue: Cantonese
- Jyutping: Lei5 Jeuk6 Tung4

Carman Lee Yeuk-tung (born 16 August 1966) is a Hong Kong actress who has appeared in films such as The Wicked City (1992), Forbidden City Cop (1996), the North American Knock Off (1998) with Jean-Claude Van Damme and The Untamed (2019). She is best known for her role as Xiaolongnü in the 1995 TV series adaptation of Louis Cha's wuxia novel The Return of the Condor Heroes.

== Filmography ==
=== Television ===
Year	English title	Chinese title	Role	Notes
1994	ICAC Investigators 1994	廉政行動1994	Mabel	Guest star
1995	The Condor Heroes 95	神鵰俠侶	Siu-lung-noi	
1997	Demi-Gods and Semi-Devils	天龍八部	Wong Yu-yin / Wong Yu-yin's mother / Wong Yu-yin's grandmother	
2000	Home	緣來一家人	Cai Jia	
2000	Qiren Qi An	奇人奇案	Xu Runong	
2001	Legendary Fighter: Yang's Heroine	楊門女將—女兒當自強	She's daughter	
2001	Qiuxiang	秋香	Qiu Xiang	
2003	Guitu Ru Hong	歸途如虹	Lin Jiayi	
2004	Wu Dang	武當		
2004	Da Song Jing Shi Chuanqi	大宋驚世傳奇		
2014	Never Dance Alone	女人俱樂部	Mo Siu-sze	
2018	Battle Through the Heavens	斗破苍穹	Gu Wenxin	
2019	The Untamed	陈情令	Lan Yi	
2019	Begonia Rouge	海棠经雨胭脂透	He Chunyan	
2022	Who Rules The World	且试天下	Queen Baili	

=== Films ===
Year	English title	Chinese title	Role	Notes
1990	Killer's Romance	浪漫殺手自由人	Amy	
1992	The Wicked City	妖獸都市	Orchid	
1994	The Final Option	飛虎雄心	May Lee	
1994	Burning Paradise	火燒紅蓮寺	Dau Dau	
1994	Awakening	鬼迷心竅	Fei Fei	
1994	Victory	青春火花	Fai	
1995	The Little Drunken Masters	小醉拳		
1995	Loving You	無味神探	Carman	
1996	Somebody Up There Likes Me	浪漫風暴	Gloria Chan	
1996	Forbidden City Cop	大內密探零零發	Gum Tso / Kam Cho	
1996	Lover's Tears	情人的眼淚	Heung Cheng	
1996	War of the Under World	洪興仔之江湖大風暴	Tong	
1997	Lifeline	十萬火急	Dr Annie Chan	
1997	Final Justice	最後判決	Barrister Koo May	
1997	Too Many Ways to Be No. 1	一個字頭的誕生		
1997	The Odd One Dies	兩個只能活一個	Mo's hired killer	
1997	Legend of the Wolf	戰狼傳說	Yee	
1997	Option Zero	G4特工	Kelly	
1998	Knock Off	KO 雷霆一擊	Detective Ling Ho	
2005	China Flower	青花	Ching Fa	
2015	12 Golden Ducks	12金鴨	Rocky's Gym Pupil	
2017	On Fallen Wings	蝴蝶公墓	Natasha	
2019	Monkey King - The Volcano			
2019	Defiance			
