= Mr. 3 Minutes =

2006 Hong Kong film by Gordon Chan

- Film poster
- Directed by: Gordon Chan
- Written by: Lau Ho-leung
- Produced by: Gordon Chan; Jimmy Law; Fung Yi-Ching
- Starring: Ronald Cheng; Cherrie Ying; Teresa Mo; Theresa Fu; Au Ka-Hing; Richard Ng
- Cinematography: Peter Ngor
- Edited by: Cheung Ka-fai
- Music by: Dennie Wong; Victor Tse
- Production companies: Panorama Entertainment; People's Productions
- Release date: 16 November 2006
- Running time: 93 minutes
- Country: Hong Kong
- Language: Cantonese

Mr. 3 Minutes (Chinese: 3分鐘先生) is a 2006 Hong Kong film directed by Gordon Chan.

== Premise ==
Thirty-two-year-old Scott is the son of a rich businessman, who runs a modern bridal salon. Scott is a hedonistic gentleman and a lot of ladies are willing to surrender themselves to him. He's the most sought-after bachelor in town but he does not want to be held down by marriage or a family. His life is all about efficiency and he's excellent at making decisions and accomplishing tasks in 3 minutes. Kids are at the top of Scott's list of "the most disgusting things on Earth". When his wallet is stolen during a rehearsal of a wedding gown show, Scott believes that a six-year-old child named Wayne is the culprit. The child then suddenly calls him "Dad".

== Cast ==
- Ronald Cheng - Scott Chong
- Cherrie Ying - Wayne's Aunt
- Teresa Mo - Joe (or wayne calls her "Big Sister Joe")
- Theresa Fu - Frankie's girlfriend
- Au Ka-Hing - Wayne Chong, Scott's unknown biological son
- Richard Ng - Scott's father
- Gordon Liu - Mahjong debt collector
- Benz Hui - Li Takmi
- Lawrence Ng - Frankie Tam Kwong Yuen
- Min Hun Fung
