= The Yuppie Fantasia =

1989 Hong Kong film by Gordon Chan

- Film poster
- Traditional Chinese: 小男人周記
- Simplified Chinese: 小男人周记
- Hanyu Pinyin: Xiǎo Nán Rén Zhōu Jì
- Jyutping: Siu2 Naam6 Jan2 Zau1 Gei3
- Directed by: Gordon Chan
- Screenplay by: Nip Wang-fung; Lawrence Lau; Wong Man-yue; Gordon Chan
- Story by: Lawrence Cheng; Chan Hing-ka; Kim Yip
- Based on: The Yuppie Fantasia by: Lawrence Cheng; Chan Hing-ka
- Produced by: Lawrence Cheng; Chua Lam
- Starring: Lawrence Cheng; Carol Cheng; Cherie Chung; Sibelle Hu; Elizabeth Lee
- Cinematography: Derek Wan
- Edited by: Chan Kei-hop
- Music by: Lowell Lo; John Laudon
- Production companies: Maxi Harvest Film's Production; Paragon Films
- Distributed by: Golden Harvest
- Release date: 20 May 1989
- Running time: 93 minutes
- Country: Hong Kong
- Language: Cantonese
- Box office: HK$16,053,507

The Yuppie Fantasia is a 1989 Hong Kong comedy film written and directed by Gordon Chan, and storied, produced by and starring Lawrence Cheng based on the hit radio series of the same name created by Cheng and Chan Hing-ka for RTHK in 1986 which also starred Cheng. The film was followed by two sequels, titled Brief Encounter in Shinjuku released in 1990, and The Yuppie Fantasia 3 released in 2017.

== Plot ==
Thirty-two year old Leung Foon (Lawrence Cheng) has been married for seven years, but looking back at his marital life, Foon and his wife Ann (Carol Cheng) seems to only have endless conflict. At the same time, while being shrouded under his more successful wife, Foon's self esteem is gradually hoarding day by day. Deciding to love a life being true man, Foon separates from Ann, channeling into the prelude of divorce.

Having just started a life of semi-freedom, Foon becomes intimate with his colleague's lover, Cora (Sheren Tang), in front of Ann due to a misunderstanding. Not long after, Leung gets a new tough boss in Mrs. Lam (Cherie Chung). Although stressful working under Mrs. Lam, Foon also cultivates subtle feelings with Lam. While still in an ambiguous relationship with Mrs. Lam, Foon's ex-girlfriend, Jenny (Elizabeth Lee), also comes back. Foon takes her in for kindness but not knowing that his career has reached rock bottom after his wife left him.

== Cast ==
- Lawrence Cheng as Leung Foon (梁寬), the main protagonist
- Carol Cheng as Ann Hui (許鞍華), Foon's wife
- Cherie Chung as Mrs. Lam (林太), Foon's superior
- Sibelle Hu as Kwai, Pierre's wife
- Elizabeth Lee as Jenny, Foon's first love
- Leila Chow as Fung (阿鳳), Q Tai-long's wife
- Sheren Tang as Cora, Pierre's lover
- Peter Lai as Pierre (大古惑), Foon's friend
- Manfred Wong as Q Tai-long (Q太郎), Foon's friend
- Fei Fook
- Alfred Cheung as Mr. Lam (林生), Mrs. Lam's ex-husband
- Yip Hon-leung as Ronald, Ann's boss
- Tung Nam
- Lawrence Lau as Johnson, Ann's assistant
- Chan Sau-hin
- Kirk Wong as Solicitor Wong Yu-nam (黃與南律師)
- Michael Lai as Insurance boss
- Paul Chun as Mr. Chan (陳生), Ann's boyfriend
- Vivian Chow as Fei-fei (菲菲), an admirer of Foon
- Wong Man-piu as Real estate agent

== Theme song ==
- The Brink in the Dream (夢裡邊緣)
  - Composer: Lowell Lo
  - Lyricist: Susan Tang
  - Singer: Jacky Cheung

== Box office ==
The film grossed HK$16,053,507 at the Hong Kong box office during its theatrical run from 20 May to 21 June 1989.

== Accolades ==
Accolades
Ceremony	Category	Recipient	Outcome
9th Hong Kong Film Awards	Best Screenplay	Nip Wang-fung, Lawrence Lau; Wong Man-yue, Gordon Chan	Nominated

== Home media ==
=== DVD ===
Release date	Country	Classifaction	Publisher	Format	Region	Language	Sound	Subtitles	Notes	REF
6 September 2008	Hong Kong	I	Joy Sales	NTSC	ALL	Cantonese, Mandarin (Dubbed)	Dolby Digital 2.0	Traditional Chinese, Simplified Chinese, English	Out of print	
7 April 2017	Hong Kong	N/A	Panorama Entertainment	NTSC	3	Cantonese, Mandarin (Dubbed)	Dolby Digital EX(TM); THX Surround EX(TM)	Traditional Chinese, Simplified Chinese, English	Also available as part of The Yuppie Fantasia 1-3 DVD Boxset	
5 October 2003	China	N/A	Guang Dong Yin Xiang	PAL	All	Mandarin (Dubbed)	N/A	N/A		

=== VCD ===
Release date	Country	Classifaction	Publisher	Format	Language	Subtitles	Notes	REF
4 December 2006	Hong Kong	I	Joy Sales	NTSC	Cantonese, Mandarin (Dubbed)	Traditional Chinese, English		
7 April 2017	Hong Kong	N/A	Panorama Entertainment	NTSC	Cantonese, Mandarin (Dubbed)	Traditional Chinese, Simplified Chinese, English	Also available as part of The Yuppie Fantasia 1-3 VCD Boxset	
5 October 2003	China	N/A	Guang Dong Yin Xiang	PAL	Mandarin (Dubbed)	N/A		

=== Blu-ray ===
Release date	Country	Classifaction	Publisher	Format	Region	Language	Sound	Subtitles	Notes	REF
7 April 2017	Hong Kong	N/A	Panorama Entertainment	NTSC	A	Cantonese, Mandarin (Dubbed)	Dolby TrueHD	Traditional Chinese, Simplified Chinese, English	Also available as part of The Yuppie Fantasia 1-3 Blu-ray Boxset	
