= Larine Tang =

Hong Kong actress (born 1997)

- 鄧月平
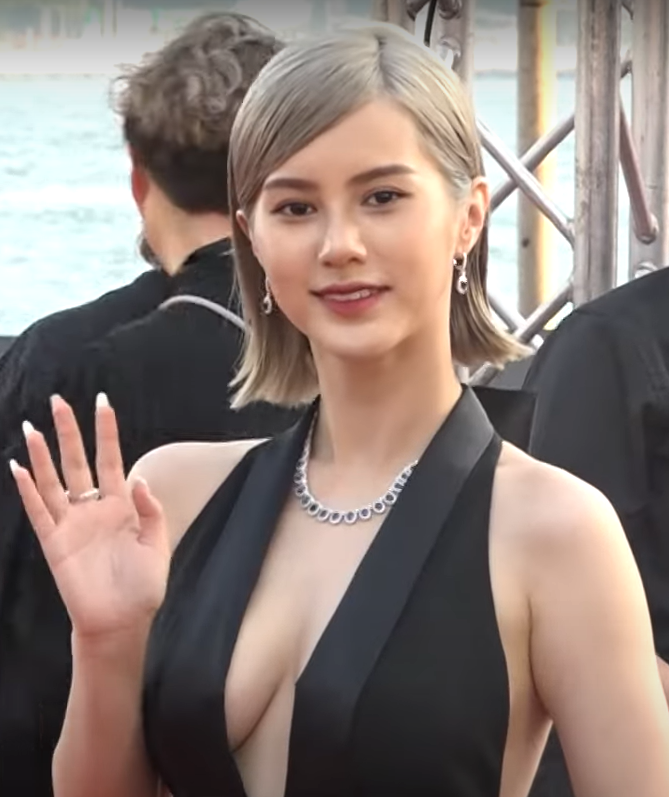
- Tang in April 2023
- Born: Tang Yue-ping; 4 December 1997 (age 28) (Note: According to Apple Daily, Tang had her birthday on 4 December 2017 and reached age 20.); Chongqing, China
- Occupation: Actress
- Years active: 2017–present

Larine Tang Yue-ping (Chinese: 鄧月平; born 4 December 1997) is a Hong Kong actress best known for her debut role in the comedy film The Yuppie Fantasia 3 (2017), which earned her a nomination of Best New Performer in the 37th Hong Kong Film Awards.

== Biography ==
Tang was born on 4 December 1997, in Chongqing, China. She was raised by her grandparents who worked as exorcists. She grew up in Baiyun, Chongqing and moved to Hong Kong when she was a child. After graduation, she worked as a waitress in a Thai restaurant. In 2016, a customer took photos of her and posted on HKGolden, which gained her popularity on the internet. She joined The Queen of D.n.A, a beauty pageant show hosted by ViuTV, in the same year. Tang was eliminated in the round of 8, but she was approached and signed by GME after the show.

In 2017, Tang received her debut role as Hui Hei-hei in the comedy film The Yuppie Fantasia 3 and she received a nomination of Best New Performer in the 37th Hong Kong Film Awards for her performance. She released her first single "Crazy Goddess" later in the same year. Tang was cast in a lead role alongside Dayo Wong and Charmaine Sheh in the 2018 comedy film Agent Mr Chan. In the same year, she also appeared in the drama film Three Husbands and comedy film Keyboard Warriors. She left GME in 2019 and formed her own studio, Skyia Entertainment, in 2020. She was cast in the titular role in the 2021 romance film P.T.G.F and had a minor role as the girlfriend of Mak Pui-tung's character in the 2022 crime thriller The Sparring Partner, and her performance in the latter was critically praised.

== Filmography ==
=== Film ===
| Year | Title | Role | Notes/Ref. |
|---|---|---|---|
| 2017 | The Yuppie Fantasia 3 | Hui Hei-hei (許喜喜) | |
| 2018 | Agent Mr Chan | Yuki | |
| 2018 | Three Husbands | Sau Ming (秀明) | |
| 2018 | Keyboard Warriors | Jun | |
| 2021 | All U Need Is Love | Japanese actress | |
| 2021 | P.T.G.F | Tsi Shun (芷純) | |
| 2022 | Breakout Brothers 2 | Girl at store | Cameo |
| 2022 | The Sparring Partner | Mika | |
| 2022 | Let It Ghost | Mabel | |
| 2026 | Kung Fu Soccer | Jinlong team captain | |

=== Television ===
| Year | Title | Role | Notes/Ref. |
|---|---|---|---|
| 2018 | VR Exorcist | Charlie | Guest role |
| 2023 | Beyond the Common Ground | Mrs. Chan | Cameo |

== Discography ==
=== Singles ===
| Year | Title | Ref. |
|---|---|---|
| 2017 | "Crazy Goddess" (女神經) | |
| 2018 | "Best Actor" (最佳演員) | |
| 2021 | "U" | |

== Awards and nominations ==
| Year | Award | Category | Work | Result | Ref. |
|---|---|---|---|---|---|
| 2018 | 37th Hong Kong Film Awards | Best New Performer | The Yuppie Fantasia 3 | Nominated | |
