= In Between (1994 film) =

1994 Hong Kong film by Yonfan, Sylvia Chang and Samson Chiu

- Film poster
- Traditional Chinese: 新同居時代
- Simplified Chinese: 新同居时代
- Hanyu Pinyin: Xīn tóngjū shídài
- Jyutping: San^{1} tung^{4} geoi^{1} si^{4} doi^{6}
- Directed by: Yonfan; Sylvia Chang; Samson Chiu
- Written by: Samson Chiu; Yonfan; Sylvia Chang
- Produced by: Sylvia Chang; Jiang Feng-chyi; Yonfan; Hsu Li-kong
- Starring: Maggie Cheung; Sylvia Chang; Wu Chien-lien; Nicky Wu; Jan Lamb; Eric Kot; Winston Chao
- Cinematography: Tang Hon-pong
- Edited by: Mei Feng
- Production companies: Unique Films (比高電影有限公司); Central Motion Pictures Corporation (中央電影事業股份有限公司)
- Release date: 6 January 1994
- Running time: 105 minutes
- Countries: Hong Kong; Taiwan
- Language: Mandarin

In Between (Chinese: 新同居時代; pinyin: Xīn tóngjū shídài; Wade–Giles: Hsin^{1} t'ung^{2} chü^{1} shih^{2} tai^{4}), also known as Conjugal Affairs and The New Age of Living Together, is a 1994 romantic anthology film. It consists of three stories, by three directors from Hong Kong and Taiwan. The three segments are, in the following order:

- Star Hunter (Chinese: 獵星; pinyin: Liè xīng), written and directed by Samson Chiu.
- Lonely Hearts Club (Chinese: 怨婦俱樂部; pinyin: Yuàn fù jùlèbù), written and directed by Yonfan.
- Unwed Mother (Chinese: 未婚媽媽; pinyin: Wèihūn māma), written and directed by Sylvia Chang.

== Plot ==
The film follows three roommates as they go through trials and tribulations in their respective love lives.

- Star Hunter - A womanizing hairstylist develops a romantic friendship with a mysterious woman.
- Lonely Hearts Club - A young stockbroker who's feeling more and more distant from his long-term girlfriend begins an affair with an older woman about to get divorced.
- Unwed Mother - A woman who discovers she's pregnant is unsure whether the father is her long-term on-and-off boyfriend or the Russian man she had a one-night stand with.

== Cast ==
=== Star Hunter ===
- Jan Lamb as Eddie (Chinese: 星仔)
- Wu Chien-lien as Icy (Chinese: 冰冰)

=== Lonely Hearts Club ===
- Nicky Wu as Steven Chan
- Sylvia Chang as Anna Lau
- Melvin Wong as Joseph Lau
- Lee Ching as Amy
- Emotion Cheung as Steven's co-worker

=== Unwed Mother ===
- Maggie Cheung as Co Co Lau
- Winston Chao as Wong Man Fai (Chinese: 黃文輝)
- Eric Kot as Keung (Chinese: 阿強)
