= Eric Kot =

Hong Kong actor and singer

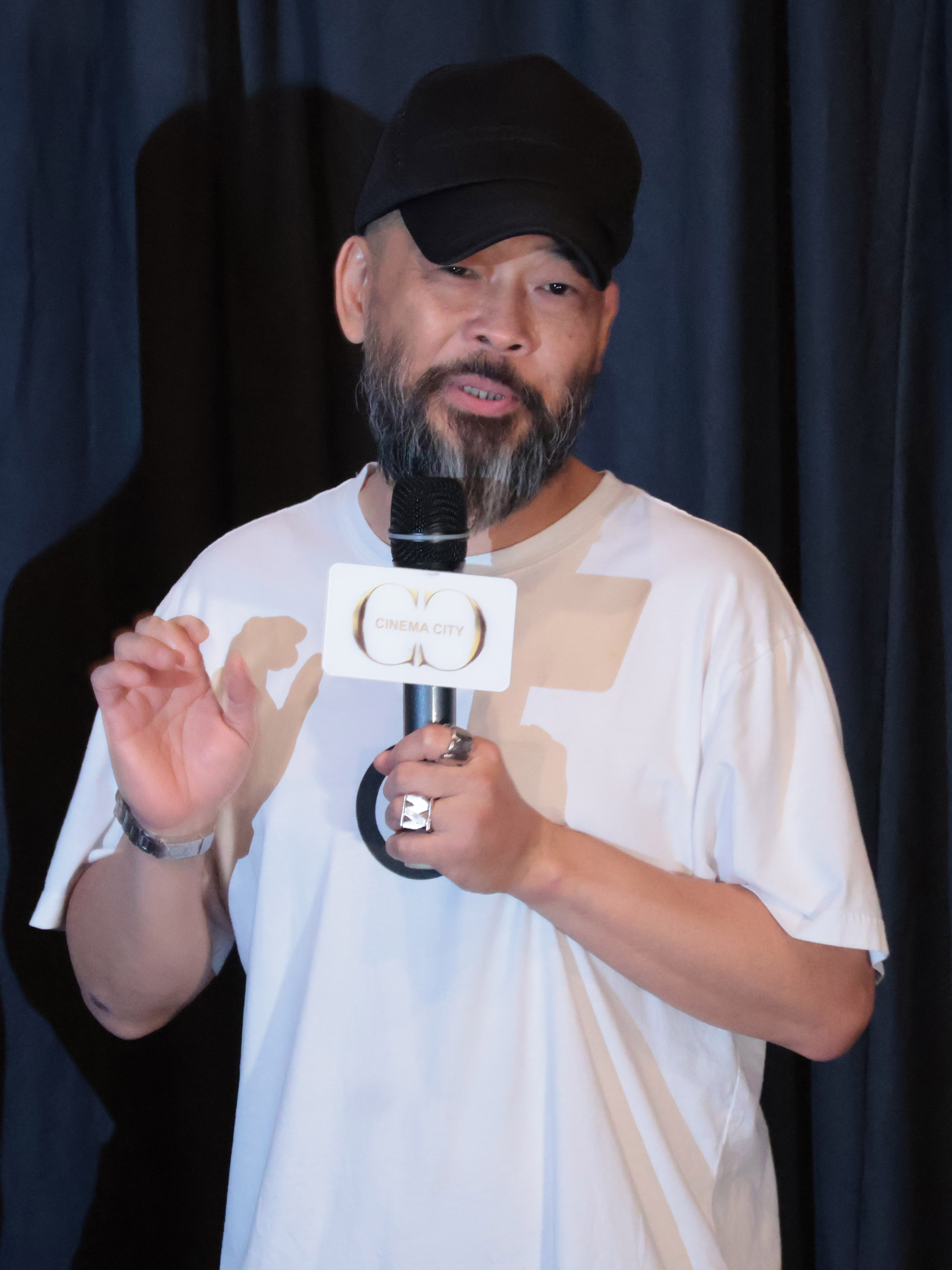
- Kot in 2023
- Born: 30 December 1966 (age 59); Hong Kong
- Occupations: MC; actor; singer; comedian; DJ; lyricist; parody lyricist
- Years active: 1988–present

Chinese name
- Traditional Chinese: 葛民輝
- Simplified Chinese: 葛民辉
Transcriptions
Standard Mandarin
- Hanyu Pinyin: Gé Mǐnhuī
Yue: Cantonese
- Jyutping: got3 man4 fai1
- Musical career
- Origin: Hong Kong
- Genres: Hong Kong hip hop, electronic, Parodies

Eric Kot Man-fai is a Hong Kong singer and actor.

Kot studied in California. He is the second-youngest of three brothers.

He formed a comedic music duo with fellow DJ and comedian Jan Lamb called Softhard in the 1980s.

He also runs a fashion store, ASIAACTSAGAINSTAIDS Like Black, focusing on selling menswear, denim, trucker hats and other accessories. He often collaborates on crossover merchandise with New Balance.

== Filmography ==
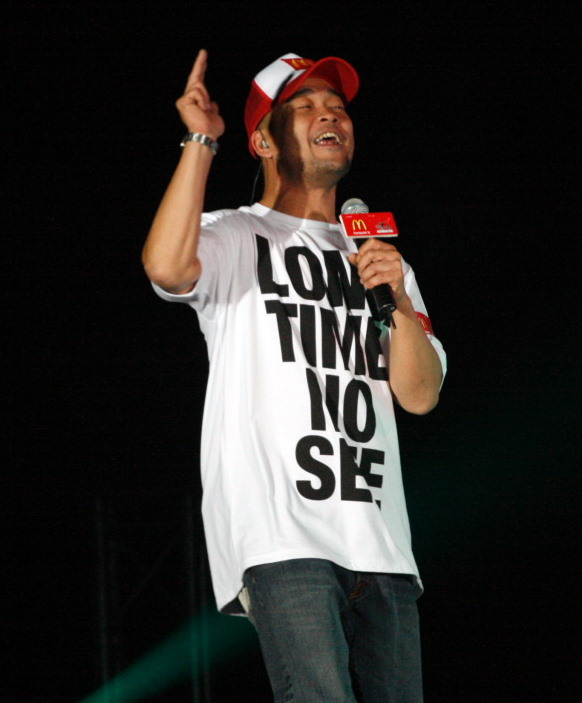
Kot wearing a "Long Time No See" concert commemorating T-shirt at a public event.

=== Film ===
Year	English title	Original title	Role
1990	Brief Encounter in Shinjuku	錯在新宿	Deliver boy
1990	A Tale from the East	漫畫奇俠	Electrician
1990	To Spy with Love!!	小心間諜	Soft Fujiyama
1991	The Banquet	豪門夜宴	English Teacher
1992	Justice, My Foot!	審死官	Assassin in drag
1993	City Hunter	城市獵人	DJ Hard
1994	Oh! My Three Guys	三個相愛的少年	Kau Ku Leung
1994	1994	仙人掌	Leung
1994	The New Age of Living Together	新同居時代	Keung
1995	The Saint of Gamblers	賭聖2街頭賭聖	God Bless You
1995	Tricky Business	整蠱王	Lau Huet
1995	Super Mischieves	無敵反斗星	Gumm
1995	The World of Treasure	富貴人間	Chu Fat
1995	Mean Street Story	廟街故事	Crab
1995	Love in the Time of Twilight	花月佳期	Little Shrimp
1995	Out of the Blue	天空小說	
1995	Jacky Cheung's Music Special Edition: Los Angeles of Love 1995	張學友音樂特輯之洛杉磯戀曲1995	
1996	Blind Romance	偷偷愛你	Yim Sai Chung
1996	Feel 100%	百分百感覺	Hui Lok
1996	Feel 100%, Once More	百分百岩Feel	Monster
1996	Bodyguards of Last Governor	港督最後一個保鑣	Lugo
1996	4 Faces of Eve	4面夏娃	Chan Giu's husband Director; Editor
1997	He Comes from Planet K	戇星先生	PK
1997	A Chinese Ghost Story: The Tsui Hark Animation	小倩	Siu Fong (voice)
1997	Ah Fai, the Dumb	天才與白痴	Fai
1997	L - O - V - E ..... LOVE	超級無敵追女仔	Dick
1997	Love, Amoeba Style	愛情Amoeba	Yam Chi Long
1997	First Love: The Litter on the Breeze	初纏戀后的二人世界	Director
1997	Lawyer, Lawyer	算死草	Ho Foon
1998	Tricky King	超級整蠱霸王	Ohmygod
1998	The Lucky Guy	行運一條龍	Fuk
1999	Gorgeous	玻璃樽	Man at pier
1999	Afraid of Nothing, the Jobless King	失業皇帝	Brother Jing
1999	Fly Me to Polaris	星願	Angel
2000	Dragon Heat	龍火	Director; Producer; Writer
2000	Gen-Y Cops	特警新人類2	Dr. Lai Shung Fung
2000	Sausalito	一見鍾情	Bob
2000	Juliet in Love	朱麗葉與梁山伯	Master Fong
2001	You Shoot, I Shoot	買兇拍人	Bart
2001	Feel 100% II	百分百感覺2	Sunshine
2001	Everyday Is Valentine	情迷大話王	Mr. Piggy Chu
2002	July Rhapsody	男人四十	Wong Yui
2002	Chinese Odyssey 2002	天下無雙	
2002	Just One Look	一碌蔗	Master Kok Pow
2002	If U Care ...	賤精先生	Biggie
2003	The Spy Dad	絕種鐵金剛	Dr. Donno
2003	Men Suddenly in Black	大丈夫	Man in lift
2003	Dream & Desire	愛火花	Jesus
2003	Sound of Color	地下鐵	Sing
2003	Honesty	絕種好男人	Romeo
2004	Butterfly	蝴蝶	Ming
2004	A-1	A-1頭條	Ma Chai
2004	Elixir of Love	花好月圓	Fishy
2004	Fantasia	鬼馬狂想曲	Muo Street Cleaner
2005	AV	AV	Loans Officer
2005	August Story	八月的故事	
2006	Heavenly Mission	天行者	CL Hui
2006	Bet to Basics	打雀英雄傳	Scott
2006	Half Twin	半邊靈	Ching Kwok Wing
2006	Cocktail	半醉人間	Vincent
2006	Feel It Say It ...	談談情、說說性	Dr. Zmong Heung
2007	Super Fans	甜心粉絲王	Sochaux; Director
2010	Perfect Wedding	抱抱俏佳人	Kelvin Cheng Wing Hong
2013	Hotel Deluxe	百星酒店	
2014	Temporary Family	失戀急讓	Gynaecologist
2015	Lost in Hong Kong	港囧	Policeman
2017	The Yuppie Fantasia 3	小男人週記3之吾家有喜	Market security guard
2017	29+1	29+1	Taxi driver
2018	Tracey	翠絲	
2018	Hotel Soul Good		
2019	We Are Legends		

=== Television series ===
Year	English title	Original title	Role	Network
2001	Thank You Grandpa	祖先開眼	Leslie	ATV
2002	The Monkey King: Quest for the Sutra	齊天大聖孫悟空	Chu Pat Kwai	TVB
2007	Tutor Queen	補習天后	Morris	Cable TV Hong Kong
2021	Generation Slash	無限斜棟有限公司	毛賴明	ViuTV

=== Television shows ===
Year	Title	Network	Notes/Ref.
2000	Starry Journey	ATV	Host EP6-10
2022	Error Vacation	ViuTV	EP3

=== Music video appearances ===
Year	Title
2022	Jan Lamb - "Egg Tart"
2022	Jan Lamb - "The Rule of Three"

== Awards and nominations ==
=== Hong Kong Film Awards ===
- Best Supporting Actor Nomination for The New Age of Living Together
- Best Actor Nomination for Oh! My Three Guys
- Best Supporting Actor Nomination for Love in the Time of Twilight

(1 Best Actor Nomination, 2 Best Supporting Actor Nominations)

=== Golden Horse Awards ===
- Best Supporting Actor Nomination for A-1

(1 Best Supporting Actor Nomination)
