= Treasure Hunt (1994 film) =

1994 Hong Kong film by Jeffrey Lau

- Film poster
- Traditional Chinese: 花旗少林
- Simplified Chinese: 花旗少林
- Hanyu Pinyin: Huā Qí Shào Lín
- Jyutping: Faa1 Kei4 Siu3 Lam4
- Directed by: Jeffrey Lau
- Screenplay by: Jeffrey Lau
- Produced by: Linda Kuk
- Starring: Chow Yun-fat; Jacklyn Wu; Chin Han; Gordon Liu; Michael Wong; Philip Kwok; Roy Chiao
- Cinematography: Peter Pau
- Edited by: Hai Kit-wai; David Wu
- Music by: Danny Chung
- Production company: Eastern Renaissance Pictures
- Distributed by: Golden Princess Film Production
- Release date: 29 January 1994
- Running time: 106 minutes
- Country: Hong Kong
- Languages: Cantonese; Mandarin; English; Japanese
- Box office: HK$37,033,685

Treasure Hunt is a 1994 Hong Kong film written and directed by Jeffrey Lau and starring Chow Yun-fat and Jacklyn Wu.

== Plot ==
Chinese American CIA operative Jeffrey Cheung Ching was ordered to escort a Chinese national treasure to the United States. Cheung goes from America to Beijing where he stays at the Shaolin temple. There, he encounters conflicts due to culture barriers and different life habits. However, he became friends with Abbot Hung Chi and a seven-year-old monk Grasshopper. Cheung is later surprised to find out that the so-called national treasure is a para psychological girl named Siu-ching. During the process of exposing the evil sinister, Cheung and Ching develop a romance.

== Cast ==
- Chow Yun-fat as Jeffrey Cheung Ching
- Jacklyn Wu as Mui Siu-ching
- Chin Han as Tong Ling / Captain Chiu
- Gordon Liu as Abbot Hung Chi
- Michael Wong as Michael
- Philip Kwok as Kung Ching
- Roy Chiao as Uncle Bill
- Choi Yue as Priestling Grasshopper
- Giorgio Pasotti as Ng Yan
- Wong Kwan-hong as Wai-tak
- Jun Kunimura as Mr Yamamoto/Yakuza Boss
- George Saunders as Joe
- Alex Sheafe as Mr. Ford
- Jeffrey Lau as Nakajima
- Anita Wong as Bill's wife
- Gary Young Lim aka Gary Lam Jan Hong as Jeffrey's cousin
- Sylvia Chen as Jeffrey's cousin
- Elizabeth Lai as Chinese teacher
- Cherl Maxfield as American friend
- Tamara Session as American friend
- Rose Tenison as American friend
- Fu Xin-min
- Wang Shao-qi
- Wang Qi-qhang
- Ju Xin-hua as Spy #A
- Yu Yan-kai as Spy #B
- Zhu Yu-kui as Spy #C

== Box office ==
The film grossed HK$37,033,685 at the Hong Kong box office during its theatrical run from 29 January to 16 March 1994 in Hong Kong.

== Accolades ==
Organisation	Year	Category	Recipient	Result	Ref.
14th Hong Kong Film Awards	1995	Best Cinematography	Peter Pau	Nominated	
14th Hong Kong Film Awards	1995	Best Actor	Chow Yun-fat	Nominated	
