= Charlie Yeung =

Taiwan-born Hong Kong actress

- 楊采妮
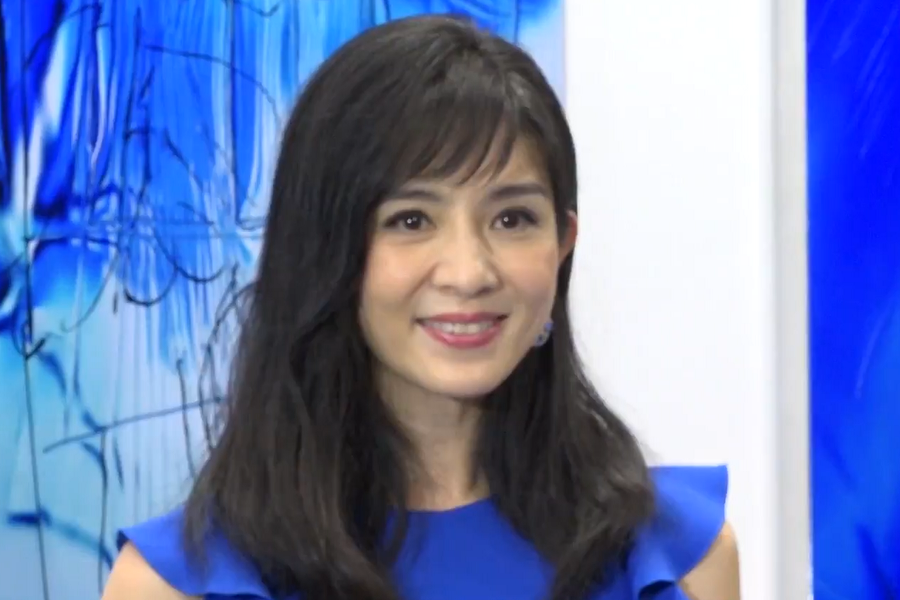
- Yeung in September 2018
- Born: Yeung Choi-nei
- Occupation: Actress
- Years active: 1992–present
- Spouse: Khoo Shao Tze (m. 2013)
- Children: Ignatius Khoo (son); Aloysius Khoo (son)
- Musical career
- Also known as: Charlie Young
- Origin: Hong Kong, Taiwan
- Genres: Cantopop
- Instrument: Vocals

Chinese name
- Traditional Chinese: 楊采妮
- Simplified Chinese: 杨采妮
Transcriptions
Standard Mandarin
- Hanyu Pinyin: Yáng Cǎinī
Yue: Cantonese
- Jyutping: Jeong4 Coi2 Nei4

Charlie Yeung Choi-nei (Chinese: 楊采妮) is a Hong Kong actress. She was first noticed after appearing in a commercial with Aaron Kwok. Since then she has participated in the music videos of artists such as Hacken Lee, Jacky Cheung and made a number of films, most famously with Tsui Hark (The Lovers, Love in the Time of Twilight, Seven Swords) and Wong Kar-wai. She retired her career in 1997, but has since returned in 2004 in New Police Story.

== Career ==
In 1992, she signed on as a singer with EMI (Hong Kong). After releasing a couple of albums with some success (she won the TVB Jade Solid Gold (1993)'s Gold Award of "The Best New Female Singer"), she made her feature-film debut in Wong Kar-wai’s arthouse martial arts film Ashes of Time alongside superstars such as Leslie Cheung, Tony Leung Chiu-wai and Brigitte Lin.

In 1994, she made her first collaboration with director Tsui Hark in the film The Lovers (梁祝). Yeung was cast as the female lead, Zhu Yingtai opposite Nicky Wu's Liang Shanbo. Her performance received widespread critical acclaim, rising Yeung to stardom. The film today has been hailed as Yeung's most representative work to date.

However, in 1997 she retired from the industry to start an image consultant business with her Singaporean lawyer-boyfriend in Malaysia.

In 2004, she made her comeback as the lead actress in Jackie Chan's New Police Story. Following that, she collaborated once again with Tsui Hark in the martial arts movie Seven Swords and starred alongside Andy Lau in the love movie All About Love. She later co-starred in the film After This Our Exile opposite Aaron Kwok. She has made plans to appear in a sequel to Seven Swords.

== Personal life ==
Yeung met her long-time boyfriend, a Singaporean lawyer Khoo Shao Tze in 1993, but split up in 2004 for a period of time. They reportedly got back together in 2011. Yeung and Khoo were married on 2 November 2013. In early January 2017, she and Khoo announced that they are expecting. On 27 April 2017, Charlie gave birth to twin boys, Ignatius and Aloysius.

== Filmography ==
- Hello Tapir (2019)
- Little Q (2019)
- Cold War 2 (2016)
- Kung Fu Jungle (2014)
- Christmas Rose (2013 - directorial debut)
- Catching Monkey (2012)
- Cold War (2012)
- Floating City (2012)
- Sleepwalker (2011)
- Wind Blast (2010)
- 37 (2010)
- Bangkok Dangerous (2008)
- After This Our Exile (父子) (2006)
- All About Love (再説一次我愛你) (2005)
- Seven Swords (七劍) (2005)
- New Police Story (新警察故事) (2004)
- Tarzan (1999) [voice, Cantonese dub]
- Task Force (熱血最強) (1997)
- The Intimates (自梳女) (1997)
- Downtown Torpedoes (神偷諜影) (1997)
- A Chinese Ghost Story: The Tsui Hark Animation (小倩) (1997) [voice]
- The Wedding Days (完全結婚手冊) (1997)
- Dr. Wai in "The Scripture with No Words" (冒險王) (1996)
- Young Policemen in Love (逃學戰警) (1995)
- Fallen Angels (墮落天使) (1995)
- High Risk aka Meltdown (鼠膽龍威) (1995)
- Love in the Time of Twilight (花月佳期) (1995)
- How Deep Is Your Love (霓虹光管高高掛之女子公寓) (1994)
- Ashes of Time (東邪西毒) (1994)
- The Lovers (梁祝) (1994)
- What Price Survival (94獨臂刀之情) (1994)
- Future Cops (超級學校霸王) (1993)

.

== Discography ==
- Feeling of Love (1993)
- First Love (1994)
- Forget Me Not (1994)
- Smiling with Tears (1995)
- Mythology (1995)
- Do Whatever you Want (1996)
