= The Lovers (1994 film) =

1994 Hong Kong film by Tsui Hark

- DVD cover art

Chinese name
- Traditional Chinese: 梁祝
- Simplified Chinese: 梁祝
Transcriptions
Standard Mandarin
- Hanyu Pinyin: Liángzhù
Yue: Cantonese
- Jyutping: Loeng4 Zuk1
- Directed by: Tsui Hark
- Written by: Sharon Hui; Tsui Hark
- Produced by: Tsui Hark
- Starring: Nicky Wu; Charlie Yeung; Elvis Tsui; Carrie Ng
- Cinematography: David Chung
- Edited by: Marco Mak; Wong Jing-cheung
- Music by: Mark Lui; James Wong; Raymond Wong; William Hu
- Production companies: Film Workshop; Paragon Films Ltd.
- Distributed by: Golden Harvest
- Release date: 13 August 1994
- Country: Hong Kong
- Languages: Cantonese; Mandarin

The Lovers is a 1994 Hong Kong romantic film based on the Chinese legend of the Butterfly Lovers. It was directed and produced by Tsui Hark, and starred Nicky Wu, Charlie Yeung, Elvis Tsui and Carrie Ng. The theme songs were performed by Nicky Wu.

== Cast ==
- Nicky Wu as Leung San-pak
- Charlie Yeung as Chuk Ying-toi
- Elvis Tsui as Master Chuk
- Carrie Ng as Sin Yuk-ting
- Lau Shun as Chung Kwai
- Sun Xing as Monk
- Linda Lau as Madam Yuen
- Hau Bing-ying as Ingenue
- Yuen Sam as Mr Ching
- Shum Hoi-yung as Madam Leung
- Peter Ho as Ting Mong-chun
- Franco Jiang
- Cheng Tung-chuen
- Goon Goon
- Woo Wai-ling
- Lam Ching-man

== Awards and nominations ==
- 14th Hong Kong Film Awards
  - Won Best Original Film Score: James Wong
  - Nominations:
    - Best Director: Tsui Hark
    - Best Supporting Actress: Carrie Ng
    - Best Art Direction: William Chang
    - Best Costume Make Up Design: William Chang
