= Softhard =

Hong Kong rap duo

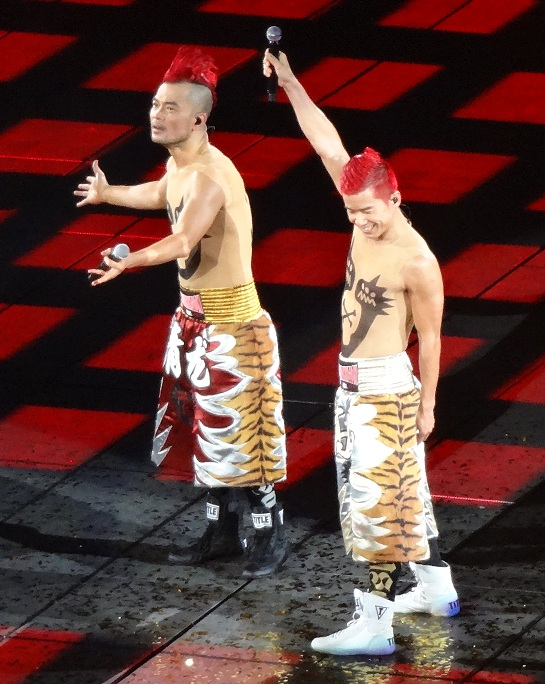
- Years active: 1988 – 1995, 2006-present

Chinese name
- Traditional Chinese: 軟硬天師
- Simplified Chinese: 软硬天师
Transcriptions
Standard Mandarin
- Hanyu Pinyin: ruan3 ying4 tian1 shi1
Yue: Cantonese
- Jyutping: jyun5 ngaang6 tin1 si1
- Musical career
- Also known as: Softhard Angels
- Origin: Hong Kong
- Genres: Hong Kong hip hop, parodies, Cantopop
- Labels: Cinepoly Records; Gold Label Records
- Members: Jan Lamb and Eric Kot

Softhard is a rap duo from Hong Kong, consisting of DJ Hard (Jan Lamb) and MC Soft (Eric Kot). The rap duo is widely accredited for pioneering the hip hop act to achieve mainstream minor success during the early 1990s while on an independent label during the late 1980s.

Lamb and Kot met in 1988 working together for Commercial Radio Hong Kong, recording a Cantonese-language comedy rap single in 1989. Their popularity grew in the 1990s, releasing their first album in 1991, hosting television programs and stand-up comedy shows. The duo appeared in director Wong Jing's live-action City Hunter film, performing the song "Gala Gala Happy."

Softhard reunited in 2025, featuring in an advertising campaign to mark McDonald's 50th anniversary in Hong Kong. The series of videos feature Softhard placing benches with a statue of Ronald McDonald in various locations.

== Discography ==
=== Albums ===
- Softhard self titled debut (1991)
- Softhard Mix I (1993)
- Softhard Mix II (1993)
- The Lost Tapes (1993)
- SH Special (1999)
- Softhard Alliance (2005)
- Softhard Refill (2005)
- Long Time No See (2006)
- Softhard '06 Summer League (2006)
