= Tats Lau =

Tats Lau Yee-Tat
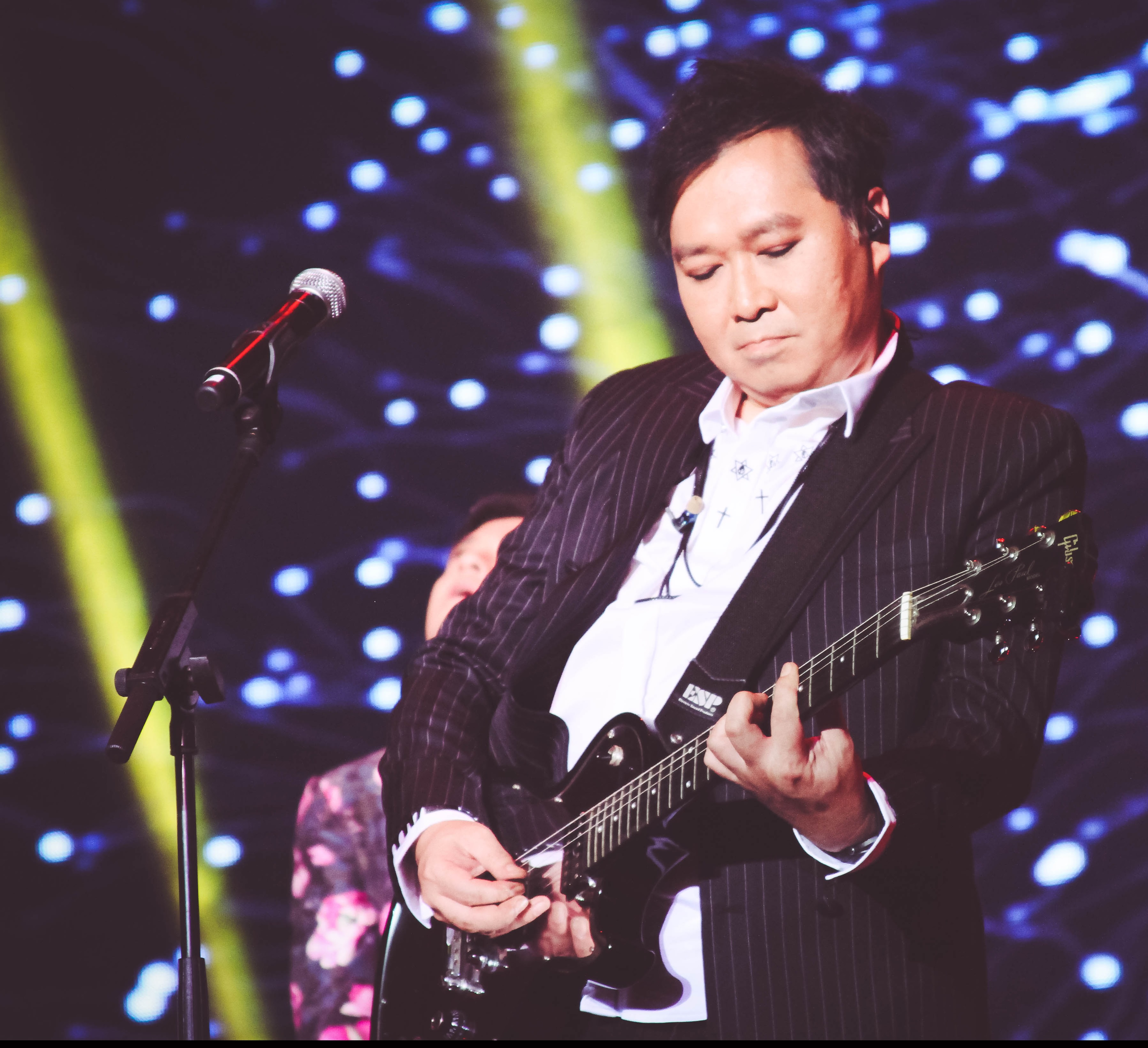
- Lau at the PolyGram Forever Live Concert in Singapore, 2014
- Born: 27 February 1963 (age 63); British Hong Kong
- Occupations: Musician; songwriter; actor
- Years active: 1980–present
- Awards: Hong Kong Film Awards – Best Original Film Score; 1994 Temptation of a Monk Golden Horse Awards – Best Original Film Score; 1994 Temptation of a Monk

Chinese name
- Traditional Chinese: 劉以達
- Simplified Chinese: 刘以达
Transcriptions
Standard Mandarin
- Hanyu Pinyin: Liú Yǐdá
Yue: Cantonese
- Jyutping: Lau4 Ji5 Daat6
- Musical career
- Origin: Hong Kong
- Genres: Rock; electronic; Cantopop
- Instrument: Guitar
- Labels: KINN'S MUSIC LTD; Cinepoly Records; Warner Records

Tats Lau Yee-Tat (Chinese: 劉以達; born 27 February 1963) is a Hong Kong musician, songwriter and actor.

== Music career ==
During the 1980s, Tats Lau was active in Hong Kong's independent music scene. He established several underground bands including DLLM and OEO (Oriental Electric Orchestra, which was influenced by YMO).

Lau's career reached its climax when he established classic Cantopop duo Tat Ming Pair with Anthony Wong Yiu Ming. Tats Lau is the chief music composer and instrumentalist in Tat Ming Pair while Anthony Wong is the lead singer. Unlike other Cantopop musicians in the same generation, Tats Lau has strong influence of Synthpop music from UK. Tat Ming Pair, along with Beyond and Tai Chi, eventually became one of the most important music groups in Hong Kong history.

After the disbandment of Tat Ming Pair, Tats Lau has formed several music groups such as Tats Lau and Dream (劉以達與夢), Tats Lau Government School (劉以達官立小學) and 達與璐. However, those groups only enjoy limited success in comparison with Tat Ming Pair. In 2009, Tats Lau formed the new band LOVE MISSION, and the other members are Charis Chung (鍾凱瑩, vocal), Rita Ip (古惑貓, keyboard + background vocal), Man Kit Wong (黃文傑, bass + background vocal), Anson Tang (鄧應祈, drums).

== Film composer ==
Tats Lau is an active film score composer. He has collaborated with director Clara Law and won the Best Original Film Score awards (shared with Wai Kai Leung) in both Hong Kong Film Awards and Golden Horse Film Festival by participating Clara Law's Temptation of a Monk.

== Acting career ==
For the younger generation, Tats Lau would be more famous for his performance in many comedy films by Stephen Chow such as The God of Cookery, Forbidden City Cop and many other Hong Kong comedy films.

== Filmography ==
- Cageman (1992)
- The God of Cookery (1996)
- Forbidden City Cop (1996)
- The Tricky Master (1999)
- Fatal Contact (2006)
- The Jade and the Pearl (2010)
- Perfect Wedding (2010)
- The Way We Were (2011)
- I Love Hong Kong 2012 (2012)
- Good-for-Nothing Heros (2012)
- When C Goes with G7 (2013)
- Just Another Margin (2014)
- Aberdeen (2014)
- Kung Fu Angels (2014)
- Ip Man 3 (2015)
- Paws Men (2018)
- Lucid Dreams (2018)
