= Final Justice (1997 film) =

1997 Hong Kong film by Chiu Sung Kee

- Film poster

Chinese name
- Traditional Chinese: 最后判决
Transcriptions
- Directed by: Chiu Sung Kee
- Written by: John Chan Kin-Chung
- Produced by: Johnnie To
- Starring: Chan Lung; Lau Ching-Wan; Carman Lee; Danny Lee; Eric Tsang
- Cinematography: Tony Cheung
- Edited by: Kwong Chi-Leung
- Music by: Raymond Wong Pak-ming
- Production companies: Media Asia Films; Milkyway Image
- Release date: 8 March 1997 (Hong Kong)
- Running time: 105 minutes
- Country: Hong Kong
- Language: Cantonese

Final Justice (Chinese: 最后判决) is a 1997 Hong Kong film directed by Chiu Sung Kee and produced by Johnnie To.

== Cast and roles ==
- Chan Lung – Chi-Lone
- Lau Ching-Wan – Father Lee (Ho)
- Carman Lee – Koo May
- Danny Lee
- Eric Tsang – Kim Shun-Fat
- Tse Kwan-Ho
- Almen Wong Pui-Ha – Donna Cheung
