= Ashes of Time =

1994 Hong Kong film by Wong Kar-wai

- Film poster
- 東邪西毒
- Directed by: Wong Kar-wai
- Screenplay by: Wong Kar-wai
- Based on: The Legend of the Condor Heroes by Jin Yong
- Produced by: Wong Kar-wai; Jeffrey Lau; Jacky Pang
- Starring: Leslie Cheung; Tony Leung Ka-fai; Brigitte Lin; Tony Leung Chiu-Wai; Carina Lau; Charlie Yeung; Jacky Cheung; Maggie Cheung
- Cinematography: Christopher Doyle; Pun-Leung Kwan
- Edited by: Hai Kit-wai; Kwong Chi-leung; William Chang; Patrick Tam
- Music by: Frankie Chan; Roel A. García
- Production companies: Jet Tone Productions; Beijing Film Studio; Tsui Siu Ming Production; Scholar Films; Pony Canyon Inc.
- Distributed by: Newport Entertainment; HKFM
- Release date: 17 September 1994
- Running time: 100 minutes
- Country: Hong Kong
- Language: Cantonese
- Budget: HK$40,000,000 (estimated)
- Box office: HK$9,023,583 (HK); US$1,912,490 (redux)

Ashes of Time (東邪西毒) is a 1994 Hong Kong wuxia film written and directed by Wong Kar-wai, starring Leslie Cheung, Tony Leung Ka-fai, Brigitte Lin, Tony Leung Chiu-Wai, Carina Lau, Charlie Yeung, Jacky Cheung, and Maggie Cheung. The film serves as a backstory for some characters from the novel The Legend of the Condor Heroes by Jin Yong. It was selected in September 1994 to compete for the Golden Lion at the 51st Venice International Film Festival.

== Plot ==
Ouyang Feng leaves his hometown. He runs an inn near a desert town and works as a broker for hired killers. Each year during Jingzhe, his friend Huang Yaoshi visits him. One year, Huang brings a jar of wine, 'Zui Sheng Meng Si', said to erase all memories, passing it to Ouyang as a gift from someone else. Ouyang doesn't drink it, while Huang gets drunk and departs early next day.

A month later, Huang arrives at the hometown of Blind Swordsman, his former best friend. He meets Blind Swordsman's wife, Peach Blossom. Years ago, a tangled romance had driven them all apart. Later, Huang crosses paths with Blind Swordsman elsewhere. Blind Swordsman renounces his vow to kill him the next time he sees Huang, as his eyesight is slowly fading.

Murong Yang, a prince of the former Yan kingdom, visits Ouyang's inn and asks him to kill Huang for breaking a promise to marry his sister, Murong Yin. Murong Yin later asks Ouyang to kill her brother as she believes that her brother has become too possessive and prevents her from marrying Huang. Ouyang realizes that Murong Yang and Murong Yin are actually the same person. A drunken Murong mistakes Ouyang for Huang. Ouyang responds in Huang’s voice, professing his love, and the two share an intimate night—each yearning for someone else. Descending further into psychosis, Murong Yang/Yin reemerges a few years later as the formidable Dugu Qiubai.

At Xiazhi, Young Girl from the village offers her mule and a basket of eggs to Ouyang to hire someone to avenge her brother who was killed by a high official's private soldiers. She refuses Ouyang's suggestion of prostituting herself and decides to wait there for someone kind enough to take her case. In her, Ouyang sees a reflection of The Woman he loves, his nights filled with recurring dreams of peach blossoms in his hometown.

Blind Swordsman visits Ouyang's inn. He hopes to fund his trip home and see 'peach blossoms' one last time before he becomes completely blind. He takes the job to wipe out the bandits for the villagers. He leaves his final wishes with Ouyang in case he fails, asking Ouyang to tell Huang to visit his hometown. Before leaving, he forces a kiss on Young Girl because she reminds him of Peach Blossom. Despite his superior martial arts, he is eventually overwhelmed and killed by the bandits. As he dies, the image of Peach Blossom is the last thing to flicker before his eyes.

At Bailu, Hong Qi, a down-and-out martial artist, is taken in by Ouyang and takes up the unfinished job to eliminate the bandits. With information gathered from the Blind Swordsman's body, Hong Qi defeats the bandits. Later, he decides to help Young Girl for free. He successfully kills those soldiers, though the victory costs him a finger. After recovering, he leaves the inn to roam the world with his wife, and later becomes the famed Northern Beggar.

The following Lichun, Ouyang visits Blind Swordsman's hometown to see peach blossoms. He meets Peach Blossom and realizes that Blind Swordsman was referring to his wife's name instead of real flowers. Amidst the sound of Peach Blossom weeping for her husband, Ouyang suddenly understands the true reason behind Huang’s yearly visits.

Huang’s perspective finally reveals the truth. Ouyang and The Woman were in love, but Ouyang's stubborn pride prevented him from confessing. Out of spite, she married Ouyang’s brother, driving Ouyang away from home. Huang, secretly loving The Woman, uses the pretext of bringing her news of Ouyang to visit them every year when the peach blossoms bloom, and grows to love 'peach blossoms'. Years later, consumed by her own regret, The Woman pines away and dies. Huang gradually loses his memory, remembering only his love for peach blossoms. He enters a life of seclusion and calls himself the Eastern Heretic.

The following Jingzhe, Huang never returns to visit Ouyang. Later, Ouyang receives a letter informing him of The Woman's death two years before. Ouyang ultimately decides to drink the Zui Sheng Meng Si wine, only to realize that it cannot make one forget. Instead, by constantly wondering whether one has forgotten, the memories only become sharper and clearer. He burns down the inn, returns to his hometown, and becomes the Western Venom.

== Cast ==
- Leslie Cheung as Ouyang Feng, the Western Venom
- Tony Leung Ka-fai as Huang Yaoshi, the Eastern Heretic
- Brigitte Lin as Murong Yang / Murong Yin / Dugu Qiubai
- Tony Leung Chiu-Wai as Blind Swordsman
- Carina Lau as Peach Blossom, Blind Swordsman's wife
- Charlie Yeung as Girl with Mule
- Jacky Cheung as Hong Qi, the Northern Beggar
- Maggie Cheung as Ouyang Feng's sister-in-law
- Li Bai as Hong Qi's wife
- Collin Chou as a swordsman

== Production ==
In the 1960s, King Hu's Come Drink with Me raised the artistic level of wuxia films. Wong Kar-wai grew up immersed in wuxia culture. In 1972, Bruce Lee's The Way of the Dragon brought jianghu culture to the global stage. In the mid-1990s, wuxia films entered a new stage. Wong selected characters from wuxia novelist Jin Yong's novel The Legend of the Condor Heroes and created an unprecedented wuxia story.

The film serves as a backstory to The Legend of the Condor Heroes as it imagines some of the older characters when they were younger. It focuses on a villain (Ouyang Feng) and humanises him while retaining his despicable qualities. Ouyang Feng, known as the Western Venom, crosses paths with the other powerful martial arts masters. Their backstories are depicted with great liberty and sometimes completely subvert the intended meaning from the novel.

During the film's long-delayed production, Wong produced a parody of the same novel with much of the same cast (in different roles) titled The Eagle Shooting Heroes.

Using negatives from around the world, Wong re-edited and re-scored the film in 2008 for future theater, DVD and Blu-ray releases under the title Ashes of Time Redux. The film was reduced from 100 to 93 minutes.

== Soundtrack ==
The music was composed by Frankie Chan and Roel A. García, and produced by Rock Records in Hong Kong and Taiwan. It was released in 1994. The redux version features additional cello solos by Yo-Yo Ma.

Original Motion Picture Soundtrack Track Listing
No.	Title	Length
1.	"序幕: 天地孤影任我行" (Prelude – A Lonely Heart)	2:50
2.	"殺手生涯" (The Killer's Career)	3:55
3.	"情慾流轉" (A Flood of Love)	2:45
4.	"又愛又恨" (Both Love and Hate)	4:15
5.	"幻影交疊" (Illusion)	3:25
6.	"昔情難追" (Bygone Love)	4:06
7.	"馬賊來襲" (An Attack by the Highwaymen)	3:17
8.	"痴痴期盼" (Expectation)	5:00
9.	"糾結難解" (Tangle)	5:18
10.	"決鬥" (A Duel)	3:35
11.	"塵歸塵 土歸土" (Dust to Dust)	5:58
12.	"摯愛" (Sincere Love)	3:11
13.	"追憶" (Reminiscence)	3:58
14.	"真相" (The Truth)	3:03
15.	"終曲: 世事蒼茫成雲煙" (Finale – Gone with the Wind)	2:52

== Reception ==
=== Critical response ===
When the film was first shown in Hong Kong, it received mixed reviews. Critics found it so elliptical that it was almost impossible to make out any semblance of a plot, saying that Wong Kar-wai had made an introspective film that focuses on the main characters’ inner lives rather than their martial arts performances. This decision is very rare in a wuxia film.

In the New York Times, Lawrence Van Gelder also gave Ashes of Time a mixed review:

For those who seek metaphors, Ashes of Time... presents the eye as well as the illusions of vision. One character is nearly blind. Another, a swordsman, goes blind in the middle of a horrendous battle. Two characters, Yin and Yang—one presented as a man, the other as his sister—are identical. And there is a brief appearance by a legendary sword fighter who hones his skills against his own reflection.

For those who seek battle, Ashes of Time offers intermittent blurs of action, streaks of flying figures, flashing steel, and rare spatters and gouts of moist crimson, all washing across the screen like hurried brush paintings.

Like the attainment of wisdom, Ashes of Time requires a long journey through testing terrain.

The review aggregator Rotten Tomatoes reported that 79% of critics have given Ashes of Time Redux a positive review based on 84 reviews, with an average rating of 6.70/10. The site's critics consensus reads, "Wong Kar-wai's redux, with a few slight changes from his 1994 classic, is a feast for the eyes, if a little difficult to follow." On Metacritic, the film has a weighted average score of 69 out of 100 based on 20 critic reviews, indicating "generally favorable reviews".

=== Awards and nominations ===
- 1995 Hong Kong Film Awards
  - Won: Best Art Direction (William Chang)
  - Won: Best Cinematography (Christopher Doyle)
  - Won: Best Costume and Make-up Design (William Chang)
  - Nominated: Best Picture
  - Nominated: Best Director (Wong Kar-wai)
  - Nominated: Best Action Choreography (Sammo Hung)
  - Nominated: Best Film Editing (Patrick Tam, Kai Kit-wai)
  - Nominated: Best Original Score (Frankie Chan)
  - Nominated: Best Screenplay (Wong Kar-wai)
- 1994 Golden Horse Awards
  - Won: Best Cinematography (Christopher Doyle)
  - Won: Best Editing (Patrick Tam, Kai Kit-wai)
- 1995 Hong Kong Film Critics Society Awards
  - Won: Best Film
  - Won: Best Director (Wong Kar-wai)
  - Won: Best Actor (Leslie Cheung)
  - Won: Best Screenplay (Wong Kar-wai)
- 1994 Venice Film Festival
  - Nominated: Golden Lion (Wong Kar-Wai)
  - Won: Best Cinematography (Christopher Doyle)
- 1997 Fant-Asia Film Festival
  - Won: Best Asian Film – Third Place

=== Box office ===
Ashes of Time grossed HK$9,023,583 during its Hong Kong run.
