= Jan Lamb =

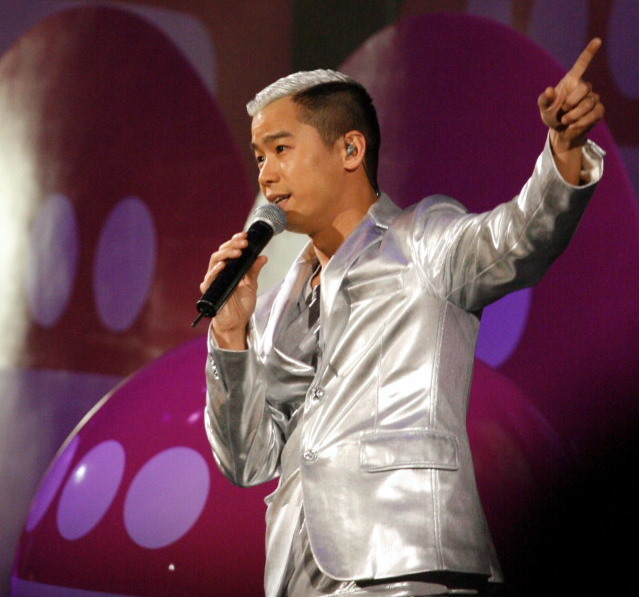
- Lamb in 2008
- Born: 28 January 1967 (age 59); British Hong Kong
- Occupations: DJ; actor; singer; comedian; lyricist; parody lyricist; graphics designer; voice-over talent
- Spouse: Cass Phang (m. 1998)
- Children: 2

Chinese name
Transcriptions
Standard Mandarin
- Hanyu Pinyin: Lín Hǎifēng
Yue: Cantonese
- Jyutping: lam4 hoi2 fung1
- Musical career
- Genres: Cantopop, Chinese hip hop

Jan Lamb Hoi-fong (Chinese: 林海峰; born 28 January 1967) is a Hong Kong DJ, singer and actor. Lamb is the elder brother of Jerry Lamb and younger brother of singer and radio personality Sandy Lamb. He formed a comedic musical duo during the late 1980s with fellow actor and comedian Eric Kot called Softhard). His wife Cass Phang is a singer.

== Career ==
=== Radio DJ ===
He is one of the DJs for Commercial Radio 2 (CR2), hosting several successful programmes since the 1990s. His most current one, On a Clear Day, is a 2-hour morning show which airs from 8 to 10am from Monday to Friday on CR2. This two-hour programme is hosted by Lamb, Ken Yuen and Michelle Lo.

=== Stand-up comedy ===
In 2005, Lamb gave a successful series of stand-up comedy shows (林海峰是但噏發花癲), which all sold out. Lamb also released a new song album which has sold very well to the extent that he has been nominated for the "Best Male Singer Award" by Chik Chak 903 (叱吒903). He also wrote many parody songs and uses them on his comedy routines.

In 17–22, 26 September 2009, another talk show under the stand-up comedy series, namely Yes, I Do 3omething (林海峰是但噏我願意) took place in the Hong Kong Stadium.

=== TV commercials ===
Lamb lends his voice to a huge number of television commercials in Hong Kong. One of his most successful commercials was for Gummi Mini Burgers, which was made up of a dialogue script of only one phrase repeated three times. The script read "食多啲 食多啲 食多啲啦" which literally meant "Eat More, Eat More, Eat More!". Lamb also dubbed the Cantonese version of the Hong Kong Disneyland grand opening commercial.

As Softhard, he was also a part of a TV advertising campaign for McDonald's Hong Kong.

== Personal life ==
He is an alumnus of St. Teresa's School Kowloon and St Joseph's College, Hong Kong.

His father was a Shanghainese suit maker. He grew up in public housing estate in Hong Kong, where he was able to freely grow and develop his creative and artistic skills.

His eldest sister is Sandy Lamb Shan-Shan (林姍姍) who was also a DJ with Commercial Radio.

His younger brother is Jerry Lamb (林曉峰) who is an actor and also DJ with Commercial Radio.

Jan is married to retired female singer Cass Phang (彭羚) and they have two daughters – Lamb Wing (Jae Lamb) and Lamb Ching (Cloe Lamb).

Ti Lung (狄龍) is his uncle from his mother's side.

== Filmography ==
- Love off the Cuff (2017)
- 29+1 (2017)
- She Remembers, He Forgets (2015)
- Hello Babies (2014)
- Hot Summer Days (2010)
- Trivial Matters (2007)
- McDull, the Alumni (2006)
- Bug Me Not! (2005)
- Divergence (2005)
- Leave Me Alone (2004)
- McDull, prince de la bun (2004)
- Women from Mars (2002)
- Marry a Rich Man (2002)
- Chinese Odyssey 2002 (2002)
- My Life as McDull (2001)
- Vampire Hunter D: Bloodlust (2000)
- Teaching Sucks (1997)
- A Chinese Ghost Story: The Tsui Hark Animation (1997)
- Black Rose II (1997)
- Sweet Symphony (1997)
- Cause We Are So Young (1997)
- 4 Faces of Eve (1996)
- Tricky Business (1995)
- Wealthy Human Realm (1995)
- The New Age of Living Together (1994)
- Run (1994)
- City Hunter (1993)
- Mary from Beijing (1992)
- The Banquet (1991)
- A Tale from the East (1990)
- To Spy with Love (1990)
