= Gordon Chan =

Hong Kong filmmaker

- 陳嘉上
- Chan in 2024
- Born: January 16, 1960 (age 66); British Hong Kong
- Occupation: Filmmaker
- Spouse(s): Vindy Chan (m. 1994; div. 1997) Jelly Xia (m. 2019)
- Children: 3

Chinese name
- Traditional Chinese: 陳嘉上
- Simplified Chinese: 陈嘉上
Transcriptions
Standard Mandarin
- Hanyu Pinyin: Chén Jiāshàng
Yue: Cantonese
- Jyutping: can4 gaa1 soeng6

Gordon Chan Ka-Seung (Chinese: 陳嘉上; Jyutping: can4 gaa1 soeng6; born January 16, 1960) is a Hong Kong filmmaker.

== Filmography ==
=== Director ===
- 18 Golden Destroyers (1985)
- The Yuppie Fantasia (1988)
- Diary of a Small Man (1989)
- Brief Encounter in Shinjuku (1990)
- Fight Back to School (1991)
- Inspector Pink Dragon (1991)
- Royal Tramp (1992)
- Royal Tramp 2 (1992)
- Fight Back to School II (1992)
- Gameboy Kids (1992)
- King of Beggars (1992)
- The Long and Winding Road (1994)
- The Final Option (1994)
- Fist of Legend (1994)
- Thunderbolt (1995)
- First Option (1996)
- Armageddon (1997)
- Beast Cops (1998)
- 2000 AD (2000)
- Okinawa Rendez-vous (2000)
- Cat and Mouse (2003)
- The Medallion (2003)
- A-1 Headline (2004)
- Kung Fu Master (2005)
- Undercover Hidden Dragon (2006)
- Mr. 3 Minutes (2006)
- Painted Skin (2008)
- The King of Fighters 2009 (2009)
- Mural (2011)
- The Four (2012)
- The Dark Meteors (2012)
- The Four II (2013)
- The Four III (2014)
- Secret Treasure (Unreleased)
- God of War (2017)
- Tempting Hearts (2021)
- Faces in the Crowd (2023)

=== Writer ===
- Behind the Yellow Line (1984)
- The Yuppie Fantasia (1988)
- Dragons Forever (1988)
- Double Fattiness (1988)
- Heart to Hearts (1988)
- The Big Heat (1988)
- Diary of a Small Man (1989)
- Brief Encounter in Shinjuku (1990)
- Fight Back to School (1991)
- The Cat (1991)
- Hard Boiled (1992)
- Game Boy Kids (1992)
- She Starts the Fire (1992)
- King of Beggars (1992)
- The Long and Winding Road (1994)
- The Final Option (1994)
- The Bodyguard from Beijing (1994)
- Fist of Legend (1994)
- Thunderbolt (1995)
- First Option (1996)
- Armageddon (1997)
- Beast Cops (1998)
- Cat and Mouse (2003)
- The Medallion (2003)
- A-1 Headline (2004)
- Daisy (2006)
- Undercover Hidden Dragon (2006)
- Mr. 3 Minutes (2006)
- Painted Skin (2008)
- Legend of the Fist: The Return of Chen Zhen (2010)
- Mural (2011)

=== Producer ===
- The Vineyard (1989)
- Neverending Summer (1992)
- 1001 Nights (1995)
- Armageddon (1997)
- Cause We Are So Young (1997)
- Option Zero (1997)
- Hitman (1998)
- When I Look Upon the Stars (1999)
- Okinawa Rendez-vous (2000)
- Heroes in Love (2001)
- Funeral March (2001)
- Every Dog Has His Date (2001)
- Time 4 Hope (2002)
- A-1 Headline (2004)
- Kung Fu Master (2005)
- Curse of Lola (2005)
- Mr. 3 Minutes (2006)
- Painted Skin (2008)
- Legend of the Fist: The Return of Chen Zhen (2010)
- Mural (2011)
- Coming Back (2011)
