= The Final Option (1994 film) =

1994 Hong Kong film by Gordon Chan

- Film poster
- Traditional Chinese: 飛虎雄心
- Simplified Chinese: 飞虎雄心
- Hanyu Pinyin: Fēi Hǔ Xióng Xīn
- Jyutping: Fei1 Fu2 Hung4 Sam1
- Directed by: Gordon Chan
- Written by: Gordon Chan
- Produced by: Kim Yip
- Starring: Michael Wong; Peter Yung; Carmen Lee; Vindy Chan; Power Chan
- Cinematography: Horace Wong
- Edited by: Chan Kei-hop
- Music by: Richard Yuen
- Production companies: Golden Harvest; Harvest Crown; People's Production
- Distributed by: Golden Harvest
- Release date: 17 March 1994
- Running time: 103 minutes
- Country: Hong Kong
- Languages: Cantonese; English
- Box office: HK$11,232,091

The Final Option is a 1994 Hong Kong action film written and directed by Gordon Chan. The film stars Michael Wong, Peter Yung, Carmen Lee, Vindy Chan and Power Chan.

== Plot ==
Because the risk of police work is getting higher, uniformed patrol officer Ho Chi-wai (Peter Yung) receives pressure from his family, which leads him to doubt his own profession and his attitude also becomes negative. One time during an armed robbery case in a jewelry store, witnesses his colleague, Butt (Ken Lok), being killed by the robbers, which changes his views about the meaning of life and being a police officer. Chi-wai is shoulder the responsibility to protect civilians and joins the Special Duties Unit (SDU). During training, due to a series of difficult physical and mental challenges, many trainees decided to quit. Chi-wai, however, completes his training with his spirit of perseverance. With the influence of his instructor, Stone (Michael Wong, Chi-wai builds self-confidence. However, Chi-wai gradually discovers problems that the SDU has to face, including ones from family, friends, superior officers, criminals and even public pressure. Because Chi-wai's profession makes his girlfriend, May (Carmen Lee), to lack a sense of security, they become estranged until a counterinsurgency operation, when May finally understands Chi-wai, while he also understands the meaning of being an SDU officer.

== Cast ==
- Michael Wong as Stone Wong
- Peter Yung as Ho Chi-wai
- Carmen Lee as May Lee
- Vindy Chan as Windy
- Power Chan as Bond
- Ken Kot as Ken
- Ricky Lam
- Dante Lam
- Matthew Tang
- Tai Ho-fai
- Paul Fonoroff as Security Commissioner
- Luk Man-wai as Frankie
- Joseph Cheung as Joe
- Michael Lam as Ching
- Lau Jim
- Wayne Lai as Traffic cop
- Emotion Cheung as Policeman
- Yvonne Ho as Bond's girlfriend
- Lam Tak-shing
- Lai Wai-tak
- Sin Kam-ching
- Tsang Chi-chung
- Hung Lap-ming
- Ken Lok as Butt
- Luk Chi-shing
- Teddy Chan
- Bruce Law
- Liu Lai-man
- Michael Lam as SDU trainee
- So Wai-nam as SDU trainee
- Gary Mak as SDU trainee
- Lui Siu-ming as SDU trainee
- Kwan Kwok-chung as SDU trainee
- Lee Yiu-king as Rascal at nightclub
- Kim Yip as Photographer
- Stephen Chan
- Jacky Cheung Chun-hung
- Hui Sze-man
- To Wai-kwong
- Wong Man-chun as Policeman
- Lau Tung-ching
- Cheung Bing-chuen as Rascal at nightclub

== Release ==
The Final Option was released in Hong Kong on 17 March 1994. In the Philippines, the film was released by Screen Enterprise Co. on November 9, 1995.
