= Mic Rodgers =

American director, second unit director, stunt coordinator and stunt performer

Michael G. “Mic” Rodgers
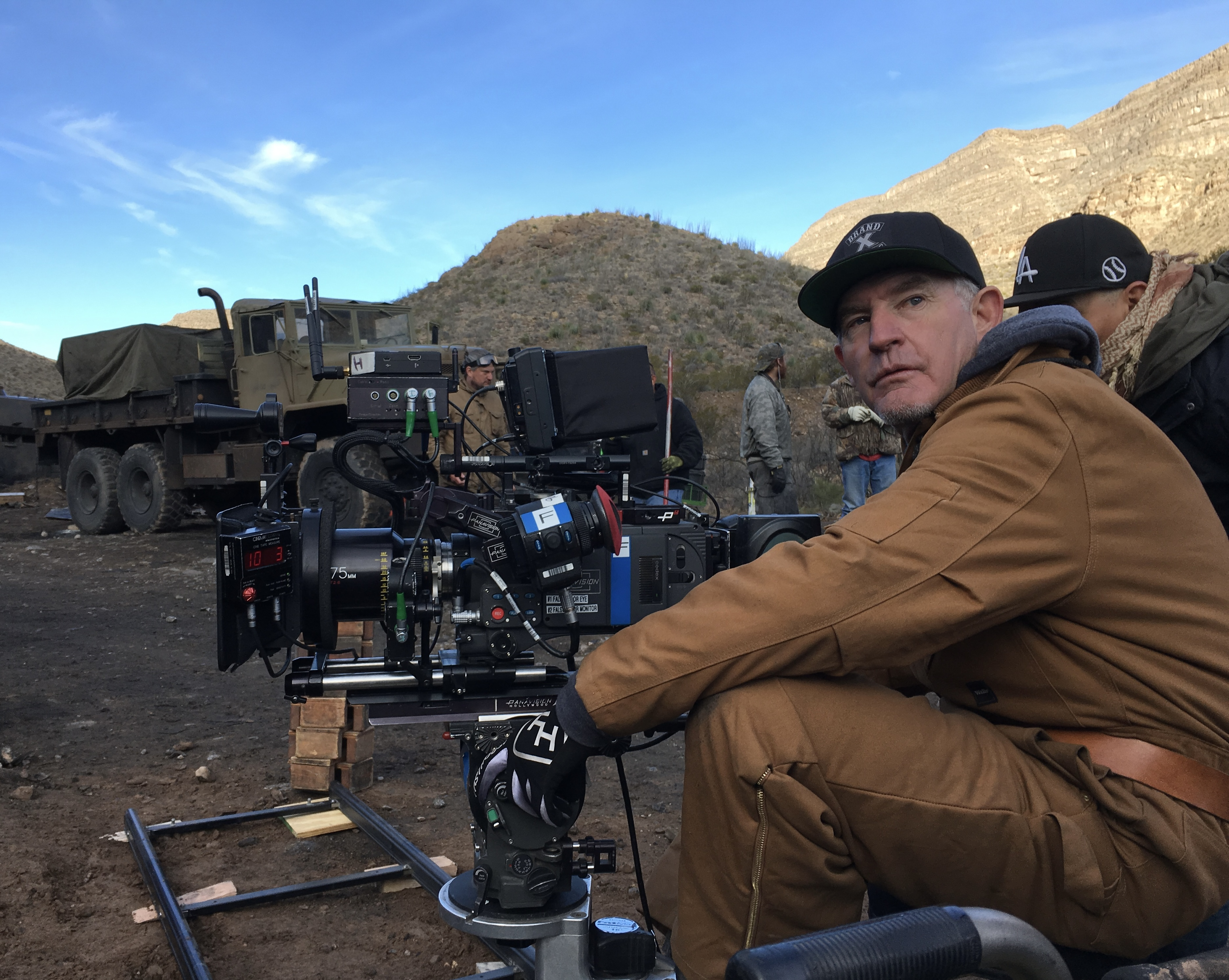
- Rodgers in 2017
- Born: 1954 (age 71–72)
- Occupations: Film and commercial director, second unit director, stunt coordinator, stunt performer.

Michael G. “Mic” Rodgers (born 1954) is an American film and commercial director, second unit director, stunt coordinator, and stunt performer. As a stunt performer, he is known for serving as a stunt double for actors such as Mel Gibson. He has also served as a second unit action director and/or stunt coordinator for films such as Braveheart, Hacksaw Ridge, The Fast and The Furious, and Twister. A member of the Academy of Motion Picture Arts & Sciences, he won an Academy Award for Technical Achievement in 2002 for his invention of the “Mic Rig,” a stunt vehicle. He has also won a Screen Actors Guild Award for his work on Hacksaw Ridge and two Taurus World Stunt awards.

== Career ==
In the 1970s and 1980s, Rodgers worked as a stunt performer on television series such as Wonder Woman, The Incredible Hulk, and Airwolf. He also played minor roles on productions such as the aforementioned Airwolf.

In the 1980s, Rodgers also began doubling for Mel Gibson on projects such as Lethal Weapon. Lethal Weapon was the first of his multiple collaborations with director Richard Donner. He went on to double for Gibson for 25 years on projects including Braveheart and Maverick. He also served as the main stunt coordinator on Maverick and Braveheart, and co-coordinator for Lethal Weapon 2 and Lethal Weapon 3. While doubling for Gibson in Maverick, Rodgers performed a team-to-team stagecoach transfer, which was a stunt originated by Yakima Canutt in the film Stagecoach. He also served as a second unit director for Braveheart.

In 1999, Rodgers made his directorial debut with the film Universal Soldier: The Return.

Rodgers was a second unit director and a stunt coordinator for the 2001 film The Fast and the Furious. During the production of The Fast and the Furious, Rodgers developed a vehicle named the “Mic Rig” in collaboration with special effects coordinator Matt Sweeney and the rest of the film's special effects department.

Rodgers received an Academy Award for Technical Achievement in 2002 for his efforts designing the vehicle. Rodgers would return for other films in the series, including Fast & Furious (2009), for which he won the Taurus World Stunt award for Best Stunt Coordinator and/or 2nd Unit Director.

In the 2000s, Rodgers went on to serve as a second unit director and/or stunt coordinator for films such as Charlie's Angels: Full Throttle, Mr. and Mrs. Smith, and Wanted.

Rodgers served as the stunt coordinator for the 2012 film Abraham Lincoln: Vampire Hunter, training the film's star Benjamin Walker to perform the film's choreography.

In the 2010s, he continued working as a second unit director and stunt coordinator for films such as the 2015 remake of Point Break, Hacksaw Ridge, and 12 Strong. He would win a Screen Actors Guild award for Outstanding Performance By a Stunt Ensemble for his work on Hacksaw Ridge in 2017. He also won another Taurus World Stunt Award for Best Stunt Coordinator and/or 2nd Unit Director for Hacksaw Ridge.

Rodgers continued working as a stunt performer for productions such as Django Unchained and Sons of Anarchy. He has also directed commercials such as BMW’s “Epic Drift Mob.”

He was a long time member of the stunt organization Stunts Unlimited, leaving it to become one of the original members of Brand X Stunts.

== Awards and nominations ==
Year	Award Show	Award Category	Work	Status
2002	Taurus World Stunt Awards	Best Stunt Coordination - Sequence	The Last Castle	Nominated
2002	Taurus World Stunt Awards	Best Stunt Coordination - Feature Film	The Fast and the Furious	Nominated
2002	Academy Awards	Technical Achievement Award	The Fast and the Furious, “Mic Rig”	Won
2010	Taurus World Stunt Awards	Best Stunt Coordinator and/or 2nd Unit Director	Fast and Furious (2009)	Won
2016	Taurus World Stunt Awards	Best Stunt Coordinator and/or 2nd Unit Director	Point Break	Nominated
2017	Taurus World Stunt Awards	Best Stunt Coordinator and/or 2nd Unit Director	Hacksaw Ridge	Won
2017	Screen Actors Guild Awards	Best Stunt Ensemble	Hacksaw Ridge	Won
2017	Online Film & Television Association Awards	Best Stunt Coordination	Hacksaw Ridge	Won

== Filmography ==
=== Director / Producer ===
Year	Title	Director	Producer
1999	Universal Soldier: The Return	Yes	No
2002	A Day in the Dirt	No	Yes

=== Second-unit director / Stunt coordinator ===
Year	Title	Stunts	Second unit director	Director	Notes
1980	Resurrection	No	Yes	Daniel Petrie	
1984	Cannonball Run II	Yes	No	Hal Needham	
1984	Beverly Hills Cop	Yes	No	Martin Brest	
1984	2010: The Year We Make Contact	Yes	No	Peter Hyams	
1987	Lethal Weapon	Yes	No	Richard Donner	
1988	World Gone Wild	Yes	No	Lee H. Katzin	
1988	Rambo 3	Yes	No	Peter MacDonald	
1988	Dead Bang	Yes	No	John Frankenheimer	
1988	Scrooged	No	Yes	Richard Donner	
1988	Tequila Sunrise	Yes	No	Robert Towne	
1989	Lethal Weapon 2	Yes	No	Richard Donner	
1989	Tales from the Crypt	Yes	Yes	Various	TV series
1990	Shannon's Deal	Yes	Yes	Various	TV series
1991	Dollman	Yes	No	Albert Pyun	Video
1991	Bird on a Wire	No	Yes	John Badham	
1991	For the Boys	Yes	No	Mark Rydell	
1992	Year of the Comet	No	Yes	Peter Yates	
1992	Radio Flyer	Yes	No	Richard Donner	
1993	Arcade	Yes	No	Albert Pyun	Video
1993	Lethal Weapon 3	Yes	No	Richard Donner	
1993	Point of No Return	Yes	No	John Badham	
1994	Intersection	Yes	No	Mark Rydell	
1994	Maverick	Yes	Yes	Richard Donner	
1995	Braveheart	Yes	Yes	Mel Gibson	
1995	Virtuosity	Yes	Yes	Brett Leonard	
1995	Under Siege 2: Dark Territory	Yes	No	Geoff Murphy	
1996	Fled	Yes	Yes	Kevin Hooks	
1996	The Rock	Yes	No	Michael Bay	
1996	Ransom	Yes	No	Ron Howard	
1996	Twister	Yes	No	Jan De Bont	
1997	Nothing to Lose	Yes	Yes	Steve Oedekerk	
1997	Mouse Hunt	Yes	No	Adam Rifkin	
1997	Batman & Robin	Yes	No	Joel Schumacher	
1997	Volcano	Yes	Yes	Mick Jackson	
1998	Lethal Weapon 4	Yes	Yes	Richard Donner	
1998	Species II	No	Yes	Peter Medak	
1998	Godzilla	Yes	No	Roland Emmerich	
1999	Payback	Yes	Yes	Brian Helgeland	
2000	The Patriot	Yes	No	Roland Emmerich	
2001	The Fast and the Furious	Yes	Yes	Rob Cohen	
2001	Texas Rangers	No	Yes	Steve Miner	
2001	James Dean	No	Yes	Mark Rydell	TV movie
2001	The Last Castle	Yes	Yes	Rod Lurie	
2003	Charlie’s Angels: Full Throttle	Yes	Yes	McG	
2004	Catch That Kid	No	Yes	Bart Freundlich	
2004	Taking Lives	No	Yes	D.J. Caruso	
2004	National Treasure	No	Yes	Jon Turteltaub	
2005	Sin City	Yes	No	Robert Rodriguez and Frank Miller	
2005	XXX: State of the Union	Yes	No	Lee Tamahori	
2005	Mr. and Mrs. Smith	Yes	Yes	Doug Liman	
2005	Zathura: A Space Adventure	Yes	No	Jon Favreau	
2006	Apocalypto	Yes	Yes	Mel Gibson	
2006	Southland Tales	Yes	No	Richard Kelly	
2006	Payback: Straight Up	Yes	Yes	Brian Helgeland	
2006	Tenacious D in The Pick of Destiny	Yes	No	Liam Lynch	
2007	Superbad	Yes	No	Greg Mottola	
2008	The Eye	Yes	Yes	David Moreau and Xavier Palud	New Mexico
2008	Wanted	Yes	Yes	Timur Bekmambetov	
2008	Iron Man	Yes	No	Jon Favreau	
2009	Fast & Furious	No	Yes	Justin Lin	
2009	Fighting	Yes	Yes	Dito Montiel	
2009	The Final Destination	Yes	No	David R. Ellis	
2010	Iron Man 2	Yes	No	Jon Favreau	
2011	Straw Dogs	Yes	Yes	Rod Lurie	
2012	Abraham Lincoln: Vampire Hunter	Yes	Yes	Timur Bekmambetov	Civil War Unit
2012	Django Unchained	Yes	No	Quentin Tarantino	
2013	A Good Day to Die Hard	Yes	No	John Moore	
2013	Snitch	Yes	No	Ric Roman Waugh	
2013	The Lone Ranger	Yes	No	Gore Verbinski	
2013	Thor: The Dark World	Yes	No	Alan Taylor	
2014	Captain America: The Winter Soldier	Yes	No	Anthony and Joe Russo	
2014	Transformers: Age of Extinction	Yes	No	Michael Bay	
2015	The Boy Next Door	Yes	Yes	Rob Cohen	
2015	Point Break	Yes	Yes	Ericson Core	
2016	Hacksaw Ridge	Yes	Yes	Mel Gibson	
2016	The Magnificent Seven	Yes	No	Antoine Fuqua	
2016	Blood Father	Yes	Yes	Jean-François Richet	For additional photography
2018	12 Strong	Yes	Yes	Nicolai Fuglsig	
2023	Surrounded	Yes	No	Anthony Mandler	
2024	Beverly Hills Cop: Axel F	Yes	No	Mark Molloy	

=== Stunt Performer ===
Year	Title	Notes
1978	The Return of Captain Nemo	TV series
1979	Survival Run	
1979	1941	Uncredited
1980	Resurrection	Double for Sam Shepard
1980	In God We Trust	Alternately known as Gimme That Old Time Religion
1980	Gridlock	
1981	Fall Guy	TV series
1981	Simon & Simon	TV series
1981	Dynasty	TV series
1981	Riker	TV series pilot
1981	The Archer	TV movie
1981	The Devil & Max Devlin	
1981	The Incredible Hulk	
1981	Underground Aces	
1982	A Time to Die	
1982	Megaforce	
1982	Yes, Giorgio	
1983	The Sting II	
1983	Stroker Ace	
1983	D.C. Cab	
1984	Raw Courage	
1984	Reckless	
1984	Cannonball Run 2	
1984	The Adventures of Buckaroo Banzai Across the 8th Dimension	
1984	The Woman in Red	As Mic Rogers
1984	Dreamscape	Double for Dennis Quaid
1984	Cover Up	
1984	Beverly Hills Cop	
1984	City Heat	Double for Burt Reynolds
1984	2010: The Year We Make Contact	
1984	Birdy	
1985	Into the Night	
1986	Iron Eagle	
1986	Legal Eagles	As Mic Rogers
1986	Out of Bounds	
1986	When the Bough Breaks	
1986	Let's Get Harry	
1987	Lethal Weapon	Double for Mel Gibson
1987	Down Twisted	As Mic Rodger
1987	Kidnapped	
1987	NightForce	Video
1987	Bulletproof	
1987	World Gone Wild	Also Stunt Coordinator
1988	Off Limits	
1988	Rambo III	
1988	Scrooged	
1988	Tequila Sunrise	Double for Mel Gibson
1989	Dead Bang	
1989	K-9	
1989	Road House	
1989	Lethal Weapon 2	Double for Mel Gibson
1990	Phantom of the Mall: Eric's Revenge	
1990	Bird on a Wire	Double for Mel Gibson
1991	Tales from the Crypt	TV series - Ep: Carrion Death
1991	Run	
1991	For the Boys	
1992	Radio Flyer	
1992	Lethal Weapon 3	Double for Mel Gibson
1992	Forever Young	Double for Mel Gibson
1993	Marked for Murder	
1993	Point of No Return	
1993	Heart & Souls	
1993	Gettysburg	
1994	Intersection	Double for Richard Gere
1994	Ring of Steel	
1994	Village of the Damned	
1994	Chasers	
1994	The Road Killers	
1994	Maverick	Double for Mel Gibson
1994	The Puppet Masters	
1994	Drop Zone	
1995	Braveheart	Double for Mel Gibson
1995	Under Siege: Dark Territory	
1995	Virtuosity	
1996	The Rock	As Mic Rogers
1996	Ransom	Double for Mel Gibson
1997	Inventing the Abbots	
1997	Volcano	
1997	Batman & Robin	
1997	Conspiracy Theory	
1997	Titanic	
1997	Mousehunt	
1998	Palmetto	As Mac Rodgers
1998	Deep Impact	
1998	Godzilla	
1998	The Negotiator	
1998	The Adventures of Ragtime	
1999	Payback	Double for Mel Gibson
1999	Universal Soldier: The Return	
2000	The Scorpion King	
2000	Van Helsing	
2000	The Patriot	Stunt advisor to Mel Gibson
2001	The Fast and the Furious	
2001	Double Take	
2001	3000 Miles to Graceland	
2001	Evolution	
2003	Old School	
2005	Sin City	
2005	xXx: State of the Union	
2005	Zathura: A Space Adventure	
2006	Southland Tales	
2006	Tenacious D in the Pick of Destiny	
2007	The Invasion	
2007	Superbad	
2007	Ben 10: Race Against Time	
2008	Iron Man	
2009-2011	Sons of Anarchy	TV series; Double for Ron Perlman
2009	The Final Destination	
2010	Iron Man 2	
2010	Faster	
2012	Bless Me, Ultima	
2012	Django Unchained	
2013	21	
2013	A Good Day to Die Hard	
2013	Snitch	
2013	The Lone Ranger	
2013	True Blood	TV series as Michael Rodgers
2013	Thor: The Dark World	
2013	The List	
2014	The Night Shift	TV series
2014	Captain America: The Winter Soldier	
2014	Transformers: Age of Extinction	
2016	Blood Father	Double for Mel Gibson
2016	The Magnificent Seven	
2016	Westworld	TV series
2018	Bird Box	
2019	Lucy in the Sky	

=== Actor ===
Year	Title	Role	Notes
1978	M*A*S*H	Private	
1978	The Lord of the Rings	Character actor	Voice role
1982	Mae West		TV movie
1984	Courage	West	
1985	Misfits of Science	Policeman	
1985	Airwolf	Haver	TV series
1987	Lethal Weapon	Bus Driver	Uncredited
1987	Santa Barbara	Bounty Hunter	TV series
1989	Dead Bang	Sergeant Kimble	
1990	Perfect Strangers	Video Vendor	TV series
1991	Terminator 2: Judgment Day	Policeman in Garage	Uncredited
1992	Lethal Weapon 3	Bomb Scene Cop	Uncredited
1992	Star Trek: The Next Generation	Glinn Corak	TV series
1993	Star Trek: Deep Space Nine	Bajoran Security Deputy	TV series
1993	Point of No Return	Cop	
1998	Deep Impact	Secret Service Agent	Uncredited
1999	Universal Soldier	Big Biker	Uncredited
2003	CSI: Miami	Jeff Macher	TV series
2006	The Shaggy Dog	Bus Driver	
2012	Maniac	Old Man	
2019	Lucy in the Sky	San Diego Cop	
2022	Boo, Bitch		1 episode, TV MiniSeries
