= Rob Cohen =

American film director and producer

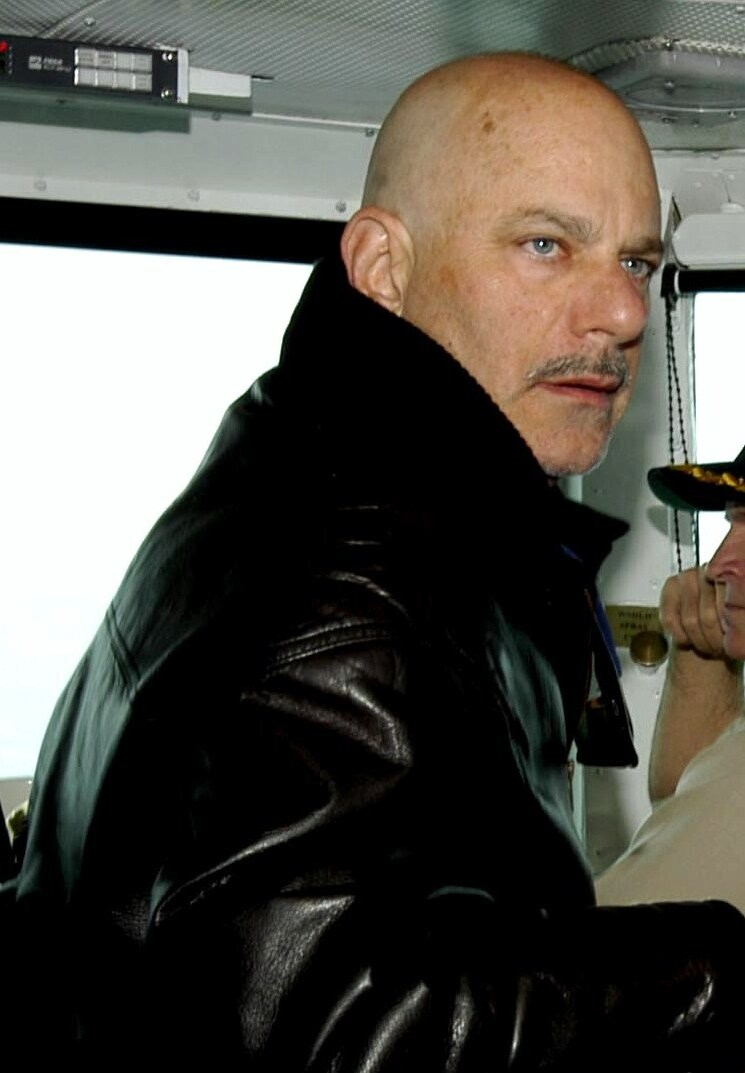
- Cohen on the bridge of the USS Abraham Lincoln (CVN-72) in 2004
- Born: Robert Alan Cohen; March 12, 1949 (age 77); Cornwall, New York, U.S.
- Education: Harvard University
- Occupations: Producer, director, screenwriter
- Years active: 1975–present
- Notable work: Dragon: The Bruce Lee Story; Dragonheart; Daylight; The Skulls; The Fast and the Furious; XXX; Stealth; The Mummy: Tomb of the Dragon Emperor
- Spouses: Diane Mitzner (m. 1986; div. 1987) Barbara Lardera (m. 2006; div. 2018) Roma Taylor (m. 2018)

Robert Alan Cohen (born March 12, 1949) is an American director and producer of film and television. Beginning his career as an executive producer at 20th Century Fox, Cohen produced and developed numerous high-profile film and television programs, including Dragonheart, The Wiz, The Witches of Eastwick and Light of Day until he began focusing on full-time directing in the 1990s. He directed the action films The Fast and the Furious and XXX.

== Early life and career ==
Robert Alan Cohen was born in New York, son of Irwin and Beatrice Franz Cohen. In 1967 he graduated from Newburgh Free Academy in Newburgh, New York, where he was president of the Punchinello drama club, member of the JV golf team, editor of the Colonnade literary magazine and a member of the National Honor Society. He attended Harvard University and graduated magna cum laude in the class of 1971, after transferring from Amherst College after two years concentrating in a cross major between anthropology and visual studies. His first endeavor in filmmaking was a commissioned recruiting film for Harvard's Admissions Office in 1970, which became his senior thesis. He is Jewish Buddhist.

Upon graduation, Cohen immediately headed to Los Angeles to work as a screenwriter for Martin Jurow but soon found himself unemployed when the producer moved out of state.

After a six-month stint as a kennel boy at the Harvey Animal Hospital in West Hollywood to make ends meet, Cohen landed a job as a reader for then-agent Mike Medavoy. Six weeks into his tenure at International Famous Agency (now part of ICM), he distinguished himself by discovering an unheralded script he found in a slush pile of neglected screenplays. Recognizing its quality, commerciality and uniqueness, Cohen wrote in his coverage that it was "the great American screenplay and this will make an award-winning, major-cast, major-director film." He championed the piece relentlessly, with his own job at stake, as Medavoy said that he would try to sell it on that recommendation, but promising to fire Cohen if he could not. Universal bought it that afternoon for a record price, and it became the Academy Award winning movie The Sting (1973). Cohen still keeps the coverage framed on the wall of his office, as this gave him his first identity in Hollywood: "the kid who found The Sting."

== Film career ==
=== Producing ===
With a career in film and television spanning more than 40 years, Cohen has distinguished himself as a celebrated screenwriter, producer and director. In 1973, 20th Century Fox Television hired Cohen as Head of Current Programming helping out with, among other shows, the first year of the epic hit, M*A*S*H. Eager to push Fox into 'long form', Cohen cold-called the head of ABC and introduced himself as 'the head of television movies at Fox'. Barry Diller gave him a meeting where he sold two TV films on the spot, properties he had found in the voluminous books of Fox's unproduced properties. A week later, he duplicated the feat at CBS under Philip Barry. Fox president, William Edwin Self, was not happy that a junior employee had garnered these commitments without permission but grudgingly gave Cohen the title Vice President of TV Movies.

Diller recommended Cohen to his friend impresario, songwriter, producer and record label founder Berry Gordy who was looking to bring his company Motown into the film business. He and Gordy connected and he was hired to be the Executive Vice President and head of Motown's motion picture division.

Cohen went to work and developed the first Motown movie from his own idea about the burgeoning phenomenon of African American Super Models he felt was perfect for Motown star Diana Ross. He sold the package to Paramount and in 1974, the cameras rolled on Mahogany in Chicago and Rome. At the same time, he developed a unique film from the Bill Brashler novel The Bingo Long Traveling All-Stars & Motor Kings (1976) starring Billy Dee Williams, James Earl Jones and Richard Pryor. To direct, he hired a then unknown TV director John Badham to make his feature debut, a critical hit set in the 1930s Negro National League (1920–1931). (Twenty years later, he and Badham would partner again to make a number of successful films at Universal Studios.)

Departing Motown in 1978, Cohen went on to produce and direct films and television series, including Miami Vice, Light of Day, The Witches of Eastwick, Ironweed, and The Wiz.

On October 8, 1986, Rob Cohen was elected vice chairman of Keith Barish Productions, which produced feature films in a pact with Tri-Star Pictures, and previously served as president of the film studio.

=== Directing ===
From 1990 onwards, Cohen moved into directing full-time. Much success followed with early 1990s films such as Dragon: The Bruce Lee Story, Dragonheart, Daylight and the Golden Globe award-winning film The Rat Pack.

In March 1997, NBC announced that it had filmed a pilot episode for a proposed television drama series named The Angel (later renamed The Guardian), for its fall 1997 schedule. The premise of the show, which was written and directed by Rob Cohen, had Thomas Ian Griffith starring as Ray Angelotti (known as The Guardian Angel), an ex-thief and martial arts expert with a sixth-degree Kenpo Karate black belt, who comes out of prison determined to right wrongs and make up for his past misdeeds. The show was not picked up.

At 52, Cohen had become an action director, directing the 2001 film The Fast and the Furious. The film was a hit, opening with $40 million its first weekend, starring relative unknowns Paul Walker and Vin Diesel.

With the success of The Fast and the Furious, Cohen partnered up with Diesel again the following year to direct xXx (in which he gave Thomas Ian Griffith a small role).

He then directed the science fiction action film Stealth (2005), which was a critical and commercial failure.

In 2008, he directed the third installment of The Mummy, The Mummy: Tomb of the Dragon Emperor, grossing $403 million worldwide. He directed Blumhouse Productions' The Boy Next Door starring Jennifer Lopez in 2015.

Cohen is also a director of commercials, housed at Original Film, having made over 150 television commercials for products such Disney's Star Wars, Verizon, Ford, GM, Mercedes, Chevy, Saab and Burger King among many others.

== Sexual abuse allegations ==
On February 21, 2019, Cohen's trans daughter, Valkyrie Weather, accused Cohen of sexually assaulting her as a child, as well as sexually assaulting another woman. Weather further claimed that Cohen had taken her to visit sex workers in Thailand and the Czech Republic when she was 12, supposedly in an attempt to "turn [her] straight". Although Cohen categorically denied these claims in a later statement, Dianna Mitzner, Cohen's former wife and Weather's mother, confirmed that she had witnessed at least one incident of sexual assault against Weather as a child. Another allegation of sexual assault was published by HuffPost on September 28, 2019. Cohen's lawyer denied any wrongdoing.

On January 24, 2021, actress Asia Argento alleged that Cohen drugged her with Gamma-hydroxybutyrate and raped her during the filming of XXX. A representative of Cohen denied Argento's assault accusation as "absolutely false".

== Filmography ==
=== Film ===
Year	Title	Director	Writer	Notes
1980	A Small Circle of Friends	Yes	No	
1984	Scandalous	Yes	Yes	
1993	Dragon: The Bruce Lee Story	Yes	Yes	
1996	Dragonheart	Yes	No	Nominated – Sitges Maria Award for Best Film
1996	Daylight	Yes	No	
1998	The Rat Pack	Yes	No	Nominated – DGA Award for Outstanding Directing
2000	The Skulls	Yes	No	
2001	The Fast and the Furious	Yes	No	Also executive soundtrack producer
2002	XXX	Yes	No	
2002	Tales from the Crypt: Ritual	No	Yes	
2005	Stealth	Yes	No	
2008	The Mummy: Tomb of the Dragon Emperor	Yes	No	
2012	Alex Cross	Yes	No	
2015	The Boy Next Door	Yes	No	
2018	The Hurricane Heist	Yes	No	

Producer

Year	Title	Director	Notes
1975	Mahogany	Berry Gordy	
1976	The Bingo Long Traveling All-Stars & Motor Kings	John Badham	
1978	Thank God It's Friday	Robert Klane	
1978	Almost Summer	Martin Davidson	
1978	The Wiz	Sidney Lumet	
1985	The Legend of Billie Jean	Matthew Robbins	Also 2nd unit director
1987	Light of Day	Paul Schrader	
1990	Bird on a Wire	John Badham	Also 2nd unit director
1991	The Hard Way	John Badham	Also 2nd unit director

Executive producer

Year	Title	Director	Notes
1977	Scott Joplin	Jeremy Kagan	
1984	The Razor's Edge	John Byrum	
1987	The Witches of Eastwick	George Miller	
1987	The Monster Squad	Fred Dekker	
1987	Ironweed	Héctor Babenco	
1987	The Running Man	Paul Michael Glaser	
1988	The Serpent and the Rainbow	Wes Craven	Also 2nd unit director
1989	Disorganized Crime	Jim Kouf	
2005	XXX: State of the Union	Lee Tamahori	
2015	Ghoul	Petr Jákl	

=== Television ===
Year	Title	Director	Writer	Executive Producer	Notes
1979	Amateur Night at the Dixie Bar and Grill	No	No	Yes	
1984	Miami Vice	Yes	No	No	3 episodes
1987	Hooperman	Yes	No	No	Episode "Look Homeward, Dirtbag"
1987	Private Eye	Yes	No	No	4 episodes
1987	A Year in the Life	Yes	No	No	Episode "While Someone Else Is Eating or Opening a Window"
1987	Thirtysomething	Yes	No	No	2 episodes
1988	Almost Grown	Yes	No	No	4 episodes
1990	Nasty Boys	Yes	No	No	Episode "Fire and Ice"
1991	The Antagonists	Yes	No	No	Episode "Pilot"
1991	Eddie Dodd	Yes	No	No	Episode "Love and Death"
1994	Vanishing Son	No	Yes	Yes	Creator
2004	The Last Ride	No	Story	Yes	
2014	Topless Prophet	No	Yes	Yes	

=== Music video ===
- Rammstein for "Feuer frei!" (2002)
- Rammstein for "Lichtspielhaus" (2003)
