= Frank Morriss =

American film editor (1927–2013)

- Born: September 10, 1927; Texas, U.S.
- Died: July 3, 2013 (aged 85); Northridge, Los Angeles, California, U.S.
- Occupation: Film editor

Frank E. Morriss (September 10, 1927 – July 3, 2013) was an American film and television editor with more than 50 credits dating from 1968. He had a notable collaboration with the director John Badham extending from 1974 to 2004. Morriss' editing of Charley Varrick (1973) was nominated for the BAFTA Award. He was honored at the 1974 Primetime Emmy Awards as "film editor of the year" for the television film The Execution of Private Slovik. Morriss was nominated twice for the Academy Award for Best Film Editing: for Blue Thunder (1983, with Edward M. Abroms), and for Romancing the Stone (1984, with Donn Cambern).

Morriss was a 1946 graduate of Beverly Hills High School, where he was a varsity letterman in three sports. In 1948, Morriss enrolled at Santa Monica College.

== Selected filmography ==
Editor
Year	Film	Director	Notes
1973	Charley Varrick	Don Siegel	
1974	The Midnight Man	Roland Kibbee; Burt Lancaster	
1976	Ode to Billy Joe	Max Baer Jr.	First collaboration with Max Baer Jr.
1977	First Love	Joan Darling	
1978	I Wanna Hold Your Hand	Robert Zemeckis	First collaboration with Robert Zemeckis
1978	Youngblood	Noel Nosseck	
1979	Hometown U.S.A.	Max Baer Jr.	Second collaboration with Max Baer Jr.
1980	The Earthling	Peter Collinson	
1980	Inside Moves	Richard Donner	
1981	Whose Life Is It Anyway?	John Badham	First collaboration with John Badham
1983	Blue Thunder	John Badham	Second collaboration with John Badham
1984	Romancing the Stone	Robert Zemeckis	Second collaboration with Robert Zemeckis
1985	American Flyers	John Badham	Third collaboration with John Badham
1986	Short Circuit	John Badham	Fourth collaboration with John Badham
1988	Hot to Trot	Michael Dinner	
1989	Disorganized Crime	Jim Kouf	
1990	Short Time	Gregg Champion	
1990	Bird on a Wire	John Badham	Fifth collaboration with John Badham
1991	The Hard Way	John Badham	Sixth collaboration with John Badham
1993	Point of No Return	John Badham	Seventh collaboration with John Badham
1993	Another Stakeout	John Badham	Eighth collaboration with John Badham
1994	Drop Zone	John Badham	Ninth collaboration with John Badham
1995	Nick of Time	John Badham	Tenth collaboration with John Badham
1997	Incognito	John Badham	Eleventh collaboration with John Badham
1997	Cyclops, Baby	D. J. Caruso	
2017	Death of the Sheik	Vladislav Alex Kozlov	Second collaboration with Vladislav Alex Kozlov
2023	Silent Life: The Story of the Lady in Black	Vladislav Alex Kozlov	Third collaboration with Vladislav Alex Kozlov

Actor
Year	Film	Director	Role	Notes
1983	Blue Thunder	John Badham	F-16 Pilot	Uncredited
1988	Hot to Trot	Michael Dinner	Track Announcer	

Shorts

Editor
Year	Film	Director	Notes
2006	Daydreams of Rudolph Valentino	Vladislav Alex Kozlov; Massimiliano Trevis	First collaboration with Vladislav Alex Kozlov

Producer
Year	Film	Director	Credit
2006	Daydreams of Rudolph Valentino	Vladislav Alex Kozlov; Massimiliano Trevis	Co-producer

TV movies

Editor
Year	Film	Director
1970	The Movie Murderer	Boris Sagal
1970	Hauser's Memory	Boris Sagal
1971	Hitched	Boris Sagal
1971	The Harness	Boris Sagal
1971	Duel	Steven Spielberg
1972	Cutter	Richard Irving
1972	The Return of Charlie Chan	Daryl Duke; Leslie H. Martinson
1973	Brock's Last Case	David Lowell Rich
1973	The Six Million Dollar Man: Wine, Women and War	Russ Mayberry
1974	The Execution of Private Slovik	Lamont Johnson
1974	The Law	John Badham
1974	The Gun	John Badham
1974	The Godchild	John Badham
1975	A Cry for Help	Daryl Duke
1977	The Strange Possession of Mrs. Oliver	Gordon Hessler
1979	Murder by Natural Causes	Robert Day
1979	Death Car on the Freeway	Hal Needham
1979	When She Was Bad...	Peter H. Hunt
1980	Escape	Robert Michael Lewis
1992	Secrets	Peter H. Hunt
1998	Floating Away	John Badham
1999	The Jack Bull	John Badham
2000	The Last Debate	John Badham
2002	Brother's Keeper	John Badham
2002	Obsessed	John Badham
2003	Footsteps	John Badham
2004	Evel Knievel	John Badham

TV series

Editor
Year	Title	Notes
1964	Destry	2 episodes
1966	Laredo	2 episodes
1969	The Bold Ones: The New Doctors	1 episode
1968−69	It Takes a Thief	15 episodes
1970−71	The Name of the Game	3 episodes
1971	Sarge	1 episode
1972	McCloud	1 episode
1975	Switch	1 episode
1976	Family	1 episode

== See also ==
- List of film director and editor collaborations
