= The Hard Way (1991 film) =

1991 film by John Badham

- Theatrical release poster
- Directed by: John Badham
- Screenplay by: Daniel Pyne; Lem Dobbs
- Story by: Lem Dobbs; Michael Kozoll
- Produced by: Rob Cohen; William Sackheim
- Starring: Michael J. Fox; James Woods; Stephen Lang; Annabella Sciorra; Penny Marshall
- Cinematography: Robert Primes; Donald McAlpine
- Edited by: Frank Morriss; Tony Lombardo
- Music by: Arthur B. Rubinstein
- Production company: The Badham/Cohen Group
- Distributed by: Universal Pictures
- Release date: March 8, 1991
- Running time: 111 minutes
- Country: United States
- Language: English
- Budget: $24 million
- Box office: $65.6 million

The Hard Way is a 1991 American buddy cop action comedy film directed by John Badham. It stars Michael J. Fox and James Woods in the leading roles, alongside Stephen Lang, Annabella Sciorra, Delroy Lindo and LL Cool J.

In the film, a popular actor in search of credibility (Fox) uses his clout to become the partner of a streetwise cop with relationship problems (Woods), amidst the exactions of an elusive serial killer, "The Party Crasher" (Lang), who has vowed to clean up the streets of New York by executing various disenfranchised people in public.

The film was released by Universal Pictures on March 8, 1991. It received positive reviews from critics and was generally a commercial success.

== Plot ==
Cynical NYPD Lieutenant John Moss pursues a serial killer known as the "Party Crasher" through a local nightclub, but fails to prevent the murder of a local drug dealer. During an interview with the press, Moss vents his frustration at the camera during a live broadcast. In Los Angeles, entitled Hollywood movie star Nick Lang sees the interview and is impressed by Moss's aggression. A former child star and pop action hero, Nick desperately wants a serious role in an upcoming cop drama, Blood on the Asphalt, and he believes studying Moss up close will let him convey authenticity in his audition.

Nick uses his connections to become Moss's ride-along partner posing as an experienced detective. Moss's supervisors pull him off the Party Crasher case to watch over Nick in low-risk assignments, but he is furious at the diversion over leaving an important investigation. Nick annoys Moss with his naivete, and Moss gives him several angry lectures about the realities of police work, particularly living with terror and the consequences of mistakes. In spite of this, Nick notices that Moss is having difficulty dating Susan, a divorced single mother, and offers him advice. While initially dismissive, Nick surprises Moss during a date with Susan and her daughter, both impressing Susan and offering lots of praise for Moss.

Over the next several days, Moss tries to ditch Nick to pursue the Party Crasher, while Nick pushes the limits of acting like a cop. Moss reluctantly brings Nick along during a nighttime pursuit of a suspect through an abandoned building. Fearing for Nick's safety, he offers him a real firearm for self-defense. Believing that Moss is in danger, Nick enters the building and accidentally shoots a bystander. Terrified, Lang accepts Moss's offer to cover up the incident and leave town. Overwhelmed with remorse, Nick attempts to turn himself in only to discover that the entire incident was a ruse; the bystander was an undercover cop and Moss arranged the events so that Nick would understand that panic, self-doubt, guilt and anger are all part of being a "real" cop. Enraged, Nick seeks to confront Moss about the deception.

Nick later stumbles into a confrontation between Moss and The Party Crasher, during which he saves Moss's life. Nick then confronts Moss, punching him several times in anger. The Party Crasher is wounded, taken to an ambulance, but he kills several people and escapes. Nick briefly captures him, radioing their location before he is knocked out. Susan visits Moss, stating that being a cop will never allow them to have a stable relationship, so she breaks up with him.

Nick returns and tries to convince Moss that the Party Crasher will target Susan. Even though Moss is convinced that the Party Crasher will flee the jurisdiction, Nick argues that the killer is acting out a theatrical revenge plot as part of his bid for media attention. The Party Crasher abducts Susan, luring Moss and Nick into a confrontation on an advertising billboard featuring Nick's latest film and a brawl ensues. Nick saves Susan and Moss from being shot, but is himself shot in the chest. Moss then throws the Party Crasher off the roof. Trying to keep Nick from losing consciousness, he lectures him again about the dangers of being a cop.

However, months later, Moss and Susan have married and attend the premiere of The Good, the Badge and the Ugly. Nick survived his gunshot wound and leveraged the experience into a new drama. Moss is annoyed to discover that Nick's best lines in the film almost entirely formed from his lectures, and jokes that he should have received a writer's credit.

== Cast ==
- Michael J. Fox as Nick Lang
- James Woods as Lieutenant John Moss
- Stephen Lang as 'The Party Crasher'
- Annabella Sciorra as Susan
- John Capodice as Detective Grainy
- Delroy Lindo as Captain Brix
- Luis Guzmán as Detective Benny Pooley
- LL Cool J as Detective Billy
- Mary Mara as Detective China
- Conrad Roberts as Witherspoon
- Christina Ricci as Bonnie
- Penny Marshall as Angie
- Bill Cobbs as Raggedy Man
- George Cheung as Drug Dealer
- Michael Badalucco as Pizza Man
- Dante "Mos Def" Smith as one of the "Dead Romeos"
- William Truesdale as Witherspoon's Bodyguard
- Kathy Najimy as Nick's Girl Friday
- Karen Gorney as Woman in Subway
- Bryant Gumbel as himself

== Production ==
=== Development and writing ===
The project was first reported in early 1988, with Arthur Hiller attached to direct. In June of that year, it was announced that Hiller had been replaced by John Badham, who signed a multi-picture deal with Universal. The original screenplay by Lem Dobbs was significantly reworked by Daniel Pyne, who also performed rewrites on Fox's next movie Doc Hollywood. Aspects of the characters were influenced by 1941's Sullivan's Travels.

The film was originally set in Chicago, and was going to be the first production of a new outfit formed by Badham and his partner Rob Cohen, simply called The Badham/Cohen Group. However, Michael J. Fox's prior commitment to the Back to the Future sequels meant that this film had to be switched around with Bird on a Wire.

To prepare for his role, James Woods followed his quasi-homonym, NYPD lieutenant James Wood, on the job, wearing a bulletproof vest. Wood had previously been shadowed by Treat Williams and Robert De Niro in preparation of Prince of the City and Midnight Run, respectively. The latter recommended him for The Hard Way. Wood was also present during production, and requested a few changes for more realism, such as in the way a prisoner was able to escape custody. As Pyne had already moved on to his next movie, Jeff Reno and Ron Osborn contributed the script's final rewrites, but were not officially credited.

=== Casting ===
Ted Danson and Jack Nicholson were approached to star in the film early on. A pairing of Kevin Kline and Gene Hackman was also considered. When Michael J. Fox signed on, he was the one who suggested James Woods to co-star. The film's police consultant, Lieutenant Wood, recommended some roles be recast with people of color to better reflect the ethnic makeup of New York City law enforcement. Among those was Billy, played by James "LL Cool J" Smith, who made his true acting debut in the film (he had briefly appeared as himself in Krush Groove and Wildcats). His participation originally came in a package deal with the use of his music, and was going to be a single-line cameo, before it was expanded by Badham and Cohen. Smith had no particular expectation of a continued acting career at the time.

=== Filming ===
The film was shot in the New York region, where it is mostly set, in thirteen weeks between late May and late August 1990. The cinema setpiece was staged at the historic Beacon Theatre on Broadway. Fox's Malibu house was in fact located in nearby Deal, New Jersey. Producer Rob Cohen served as a second unit director. Woods tore his rotator cuff when he fell off the truck during the filming of the chase seen at the beginning of the film.

== Release ==
=== Box office ===
The Hard Way opened in the United States on March 8, 1991, debuting at number 3 behind The Silence of the Lambs and New Jack City. The film ended its domestic run with a lackluster gross of $25.9 million. Woods blamed The Hard Way's tepid audience reception on recent events in the Gulf War, which he thought had made the market unfavorable to a buddy comedy.

According to Box Office Mojo, the film was more successful in international markets, taking in an additional $38,7 million, for a worldwide theatrical gross of $65.6 million (approximately $148 million when adjusted for inflation in 2023).

Shortly after the film came out Daniel Payne reflected, the film was "not doing as well as they expected. No one can quite figure out why. It got good reviews, good word-of-mouth, audiences seem to like it, Badham and Cohen think that maybe the buddy-film market dropped out. I don’t know. They made some creative decisions after I left the project. They tried to make it a bigger, broader comedy. A stunt comedy. Originally, it was more of a relationship film. A lot like Sullivan's Travels — it had that feel to it. John wanted to make the stunts wilder and make the ending bigger."

=== Critical reception ===
As of July 2025, on Rotten Tomatoes, the film had a 76% approval rating from 25 critics, with an average rating of 5.8/10. The consensus said, "The Hard Way's overly familiar formula is enlivened by a witty script and the excellent comedic chemistry between Michael J. Fox and James Woods."

Vincent Canby of The New York Times said that it is "not a perfect comedy by any means, but it is a very entertaining one" and commended its "pure Hollywood" sensibility, writing that it is "sometimes slapdash in execution and sloppy in coherence, but it's written, directed and performed with a redeeming, self-mocking zest."

Time Out called it a "light, bright comedy" that "counterbalances Hollywood convention with some very funny swipes at the film industry" and stated, "Badham handles the numerous action sequences with confidence, but the real enjoyment comes from the interplay between the two leads, who revel in the opportunity to send up their images."

Roger Ebert of the Chicago Sun-Times gave it three-and-a-half out of four stars and praised its "comic energy", calling the film "funny, fun, exciting, and [...] an example of professionals who know their crafts and enjoy doing them well." Ebert said the stunts, special effects, and second unit work were "all seamless and exciting", and viewed that the actors elevate the film's plot with their performances:

[T]he film makers crank up the energy until the movie takes on a life of its own. [...] There is a certain exhilarating, high-altitude buzz you get from actors who are working well at the limits of their ability. Faced with a plot that was potentially predictable, Woods and Fox seem to have agreed to crank up the voltage, to take the chance of playing every scene flat-out.

Ty Burr of Entertainment Weekly gave the film a C rating and criticized it as having "coyly self-conscious high concept", writing that "takes the [action-buddy-cop genre] to such a numbing dead end." Burr panned its chase scenes and editing as "visual nonsense" and called its plot "all guns and gag lines", although he found Fox "secure enough to goof on his own image and inventive enough to do it well".

== Post release ==
=== Home video ===
MCA/Universal Home Video released the film domestically on home video. The VHS' street date was September 12, 1991, while the LaserDisc arrived one week later. The Hard Way was released on DVD on November 17, 1998, by Universal Home Video. Kino Lorber issued the film on Blu-ray in the U.S. on October 6, 2020. That edition featured a new audio commentary from Badham and Cohen. However, Universal had previously given the film a first-party Blu-ray release in the U.K. on October 5, 2015.

=== Television ===
NBC promoted the film's world television premiere as part of the November 1992 sweeps. It was shown in primetime on Sunday, November 8, drawing an 11.4 rating and a 17 audience share. Unusually for network TV, it was re-run by NBC the next Friday evening, drawing a 7.4 rating and a 13 share.

== Soundtrack ==
The film score was composed and conducted by Arthur B. Rubinstein. It was released on LP, CD and cassette by Varèse Sarabande. The song Mama Said Knock You Out by LL Cool J featured as diegetic music in the film, and later during the end credits. One version of the song's music video incorporates footage from The Hard Way, and was included on some disc-based editions of the film.

The Hard Way: Original Motion Picture Soundtrack

Film score by Arthur B. Rubinstein
- Released: 1991
- Genre: Orchestral, electronic
- Length: 33:40
- Label: Varèse Sarabande
- Producer: Arthur B. Rubinstein

Track listing
No.	Title	Length
1.	"The Big Apple Juice"	1:54
2.	"Cirque Du Parte Crasher"	1:45
3.	"Manhattan Tow Truck"	2:46
4.	"Ghetto A La Hollyweird"	1:30
5.	"He Dead / She Dead"	1:29
6.	"Big Girls Don't Cry (Note: Written by Bob Gaudio and Bob Crewe, performed by Frankie Valli and The Four Seasons.)"	2:23
7.	"Where Have You Gone, L Ron?"	3:06
8.	"Transit Authority"	2:12
9.	"Gas Attack"	2:08
10.	"Killer Lang"	1:48
11.	"Smoking Gun II"	3:29
12.	"Top of the World"	4:33
13.	"The Good, The Badge And The Ugly"	1:55
14.	"Runaround Sue (Note: Written by Ernest Maresca and Dion DiMucci, performed by Dion DiMucci.)"	2:43
Total length:		33:40
