= Arthur B. Rubinstein =

- Born: Arthur Benjamin Rubinstein; March 31, 1938; Brooklyn, New York, United States
- Died: April 23, 2018 (aged 80)
- Genres: Film score
- Occupations: Composer, Conductor
- Instruments: Piano, Synthesizer
- Years active: 1971–2002
- Formerly of: The Beepers

Arthur Benjamin Rubinstein (March 31, 1938 – April 23, 2018) was an American Emmy Award-winning composer. He composed several television series soundtracks and songs for film scores. He was frequently hired by film director John Badham, and the majority of his movie soundtracks are found in Badham's work, including Whose Life Is It Anyway? (1981), WarGames (1983), Blue Thunder (1983), Scarecrow and Mrs. King (1986), Stakeout (1987), The Hard Way (1991), Another Stakeout (1993), and Nick of Time (1995). He was also member of the band The Beepers.

In 1983 Rubinstein created the score to Blue Thunder (which he composed, conducted and produced) using various synthesizers, a popular instrument of the 80's era. In the score Rubinstein used these synthesizers in a symphonic manner by combining them with brass, percussion and string ensembles. Using the Synclavier II (a digital computer instrument) and dubbing this with both the Jupiter, the Prophet and the Moog analog synthesizers. Rubinstein also created a very unusual sound by placing a microphone inside a large empty water bottle and placing it underneath a Steinway grand piano.

His other film and TV movie scores include The House Without a Christmas Tree (1972), The Great Bank Hoax (1977), The Great American Traffic Jam (1980), On the Right Track (1981), The Phoenix (1982), Deal of the Century (1983), The Cartier Affair (1984), It Came Upon the Midnight Clear (1984), Lost in America (1985), Murder in Space (1985), The Best of Times (1986), Hyper Sapien: People from Another Star (1986), Love Among Thieves (1987),Once Upon a Texas Train (1988), Inherit the Wind (1988), several Season Two episodes of The Simpsons and Dead Man's Island (1996).

He died on April 23, 2018, from cancer at the age of 80. He was among those honored at the 2019 Grammy awards.
