= Point of No Return (1993 film) =

- Theatrical release poster
- Directed by: John Badham
- Screenplay by: Robert Getchell; Alexandra Seros
- Based on: La Femme Nikita by Luc Besson
- Produced by: Art Linson
- Starring: Bridget Fonda; Gabriel Byrne; Dermot Mulroney; Anne Bancroft; Harvey Keitel
- Cinematography: Michael Watkins
- Edited by: Frank Morriss
- Music by: Hans Zimmer
- Production companies: Warner Bros. Art Linson Productions
- Distributed by: Warner Bros.
- Release date: March 19, 1993
- Running time: 108 minutes
- Country: United States
- Languages: English; French
- Box office: $50 million

Point of No Return (International title: The Assassin) is a 1993 American action thriller film directed by John Badham and starring Bridget Fonda and Gabriel Byrne. It is a remake of Luc Besson's 1990 film La Femme Nikita.

== Plot ==
In Washington, D.C., Maggie Hayward is a drug addict convicted of murdering a police officer during a robbery shootout, and is about to be executed by lethal injection. Her death is faked and a government agent, "Bob", informs her that she has to work for him and his clandestine outfit. She reluctantly agrees to cooperate and begins a regimen of intensive training that includes not only martial arts and firearms training, but also etiquette and computer use.

Senior Operative Amanda transforms Maggie into a more refined, elegant woman. She is taken on a dinner date with Bob, who informs her about her first job: assassinating a VIP eating at the same restaurant. Maggie kills the VIP and his bodyguard and is then pursued by a team of the VIP's bodyguards. She shoots several of the bodyguards and escapes from the kitchen by jumping down a laundry chute. This task was her final test and she has now completed her training.

The following morning, Maggie heads to Venice, California, where she enters into a romantic relationship with apartment house manager J.P. While her first assignments, both hit jobs, are ultimately successful, Maggie comes to hate her work. As matters progress between her and J.P. and her double life threatens their relationship, she asks to leave the agency. Maggie's request is denied, but Bob agrees to get her out of the agency if she completes the next task: masquerade as Angela, the girlfriend of Fahd Bakhtiar, an Iranian business magnate trading in nuclear weapons. As Maggie prepares for the job, J.P. continues to complain about her mysterious friends and mocks the improvised backstory that Bob had provided for himself and Maggie.

Tranquilizing Angela proves problematic and results in the executions of Angela's two bodyguards and the injury of Maggie's partner, Beth. Director Kaufman then sends in Victor, a "cleaner", to get rid of the bodies and salvage the mission. Unbeknownst to Maggie, he has also been ordered to kill both agents as failure in a mission results in death. After killing the wounded Beth in front of Maggie, he drives her to Fahd's home. At gunpoint, she gets Fahd to unlock his computer and reveal his secrets, but he escapes assassination and she is forced to retreat.

As they purportedly drive back to her residence, Maggie sees a gun in Victor's waistband and correctly suspects he is going to kill her. This leads to a struggle and the car spins out of control. Ultimately, Victor is dragged over a ravine and killed. Maggie makes her way back to her apartment, but leaves during the night. Bob subsequently learns of her disappearance from J.P. As Bob is leaving, he sees Maggie watching him through the mist. Instead of reporting her, he calls Kaufman informing him the cleaner is dead, and after some hesitation, tells him that Maggie is also dead.

== Cast ==
- Bridget Fonda as Maggie Hayward / Claudia Anne Doran / Nina
- Gabriel Byrne as Bob
- Dermot Mulroney as J.P.
- Anne Bancroft as Amanda
- Harvey Keitel as Victor 'The Cleaner'
- Miguel Ferrer as Kaufman
- Olivia d'Abo as Angela
- Richard Romanus as Fahd Bakhtiar
- Geoffrey Lewis as Drugstore Owner
- Lieux Dressler as Johnny's Mom
- Michael Rapaport as Stan 'Big Stan'
- Ray Oriel as Burt
- Spike McClure as Johnny 'Johnny D'
- John Capodice as Detective #1
- Robert Harvey as Detective #2
- Mic Rodgers as Cop
- Carmen Zapata as Judge
- John Badham as Room Service Waiter
- Lorraine Toussaint as Beth
- James Handy as Operative
- Michael Runyard as Weapons Instructor
- Bill Ryusaki as Karate Instructor
- Joe Garcia as Hassan
- Kenny Endoso as Angela's Bodyguard #1
- Gary Kasper as Angela's Bodyguard #2
- Peter Vasquez as Bodyguard in Booth
- Jaqueline Koch as New Orleans V.I.P.
- Robert Apisa as Restaurant V.I.P.
- Leon Herbert as Jim (uncredited)
- Richard Chapman Jr. as Ted (uncredited)
- Ronnie Rondell Jr. as Bodyguard (uncredited)

== Production ==
Gaumont, who handled the sales of distribution rights for La Femme Nikita, sold the remake rights to Warner Bros. Pictures. In 1991, it was reported Luc Besson had been commissioned to write the English-language remake. Although Besson and a team of American writers completed a first draft of the script, Besson and Warner Bros. did not agree on a directing deal, stalling development until John Badham joined the project later that year. Prior to the casting of Bridget Fonda, a number of actresses who campaigned for the role included Winona Ryder, Madonna, Demi Moore, Juliette Lewis, and Robin Wright. Julia Roberts supposedly turned down two offers to star as the lead. Fonda was hesitant to accept the lead role, not sold on doing a remake of such a recent film, but was eventually convinced to do the film by Badham and her Single White Female director Barbet Schroeder. Filming began in March 1992 in Los Angeles, New Orleans, and Washington, D.C. The movie was known under the working title La Femme Nikita during development. The title The Specialist was considered before settling on Point of No Return.

== Reception ==
The film received mixed reviews. Film critic Roger Ebert, who gave the original La Femme Nikita three and a half stars out of four, gave Return three stars, saying: "Point of No Return is actually a fairly effective and faithful adaptation and Bridget Fonda manages the wild identity swings of her role with intensity and conviction, although not the same almost poetic sadness that Anne Parillaud brought to the original movie. If I didn't feel the same degree of involvement with Point of No Return that I did with Nikita it may be because the two movies are so similar in plot, look, and feel. I had déjà vu all through the movie. There are a few changes, mostly not for the better. By making the heroine's boyfriend a photographer this time instead of a checkout clerk, the movie loses the poignancy of their relationship; Nikita liked her clerk precisely because he was completely lacking in aggression."

On the review aggregator website Rotten Tomatoes, 50% of 26 critics' reviews are positive. Metacritic, which uses a weighted average, assigned the film a score of 53 out of 100, based on 27 critics, indicating "mixed or average" reviews.

=== Box office ===
The film debuted at number 2 at the U.S. box office, behind Teenage Mutant Ninja Turtles III, with a gross of $7.2 million for the weekend from 1,545 screens. It grossed $30 million in the United States and Canada and $19.9 million internationally, for a worldwide total of $49.9 million.

=== Home media ===
The film was released on VHS on September 1, 1993, by Warner Home Video. It proved very popular in the home video market, and became the top video rental in November 1993 in the United States.

== Soundtrack ==
Maggie Hayward/Claudia Doran has a fascination with the singer/pianist/songwriter Nina Simone. Throughout the film, various songs of Simone's are used.

- "Here Comes the Sun"
- "I Want a Little Sugar in My Bowl"
- "Feeling Good"
- "Wild Is the Wind"
- "Black Is the Color (Of My True Love's Hair)"

Together with the earlier re-release of "My Baby Just Cares for Me" in 1982, the film helped bring Nina Simone back into the public limelight and made her better known with a younger audience.

The film score was composed by Hans Zimmer.

== See also ==
- List of assassinations in fiction

== Bibliography ==
- Hayward, Susan (1998). Luc Besson. Manchester University Press. ISBN 978-0-7190-5075-6 – via Internet Archive.
