= Footsteps (2003 film) =

2003 American television film

- Genre: Thriller
- Based on: Footsteps by Ira Levin
- Written by: Shelly Evans
- Directed by: John Badham
- Starring: Candice Bergen; Michael Murphy; Bryan Brown; Bug Hall
- Music by: Christopher Franke
- Country of origin: United States
- Original language: English

Production
- Producers: Mark Gordon; Ginny Jones-Duzak; Ken Raskoff
- Cinematography: Ron Stannett
- Editor: Frank Morriss
- Running time: 95 minutes
- Production companies: Fox Television Studios; Ken Raskoff Productions; The Mark Gordon Company

Original release
- Network: CBS
- Release: October 12, 2003

Footsteps is a 2003 American made-for-television thriller film directed by John Badham based on the Ira Levin play of the same name. It was broadcast on CBS on October 12, 2003.

== Plot ==
Daisy Lowendahl is a best-selling suspense novelist who has been receiving threatening letters ever since an incident occurred in which a man killed a woman and claimed that he was inspired to do it by one of her novels. At a public event a man angrily accuses her of being responsible for the murder. She is frightened by the man and is plagued by a fear of being attacked when she is alone. At the suggestion of her husband she takes a short vacation at her isolated beach house, where she is visited by Spencer Weaver, a local young fan who knows almost everything about her. Her next visitor is Eddie Bruno, who claims to be a police detective and warns her that Spencer may be dangerous to her. Spencer insists that Eddie is not a cop and after a struggle Eddie is overpowered and tied up. Eddie begins revealing personal details about Daisy, claiming that her husband hired him to kill her that night.

== Cast ==
- Candice Bergen as Daisy Lowendahl
- Michael Murphy as Robbie Lowendahl
- Bryan Brown as Eddie Bruno
- Bug Hall as Spencer Weaver
- John Walf as Boss
- Cindy Sampson as Jordan Hayes
- Suzanne Jacob as Babs
- Johanna MacCulloch as Lauren
- Chase Duffy as Bodyguard #1
- Travis Ferris as Officer
- Bruce Graham as Judge Martin Hickler
- Glen Grant as Police Detective
- Jason Hemsworth as Bodyguard #2
- James Symington as Arresting Officer
- Gary Levert as Male Heckler
- Darcy Lindzon as Tommy
- Rita Malik as Lady in Audience
- Agumeuay Nakanakis as Fisherman
- Juanita Peters as Reporter
- Austin St. John as Police Investigator

== Production ==
After the success of his play Deathtrap, Ira Levin penned the play Footsteps but sold the rights to CBS, which initially intended to present it as a live theatrical television production but decided that it would have to be adapted into a film.
