= Incognito (1997 film) =

- Theatrical release poster
- Directed by: John Badham
- Written by: Jordan Katz
- Produced by: James G. Robinson
- Starring: Jason Patric; Irene Jacob
- Cinematography: Denis Crossan
- Edited by: Frank Morriss
- Music by: John Ottman
- Production company: Morgan Creek Productions
- Distributed by: Warner Bros.
- Release dates: November 14, 1997 (United Kingdom); March 13, 1998 (United States)
- Running time: 108 minutes
- Country: United States
- Language: English

Incognito is a 1997 American crime thriller film directed by John Badham and starring Jason Patric and Irene Jacob. Written by Jordan Katz, the film is about a talented art forger who paints a fake Rembrandt despite pressure from his dying father who urges him to use his talent on his own original paintings. The film is notable for a sequence that reveals the specific details involved in forgery, including canvas aging, precise paints, and other deceptions.

== Plot ==
Talented New York painter Harry Donovan is an expert of copying famous artists' paintings, but is struggling to become a legitimate artist in his own right. Until now, he has avoided detection by forging third and fourth tier masters, but that is about to change. Frustrated by the cancellation of an exhibition of his paintings, Harry accepts a job forging a long lost Rembrandt for $550,000 from three art dealer clients—Alistair Davies, Ian Hill, and Agachi—against the wishes of his artist father who wants his son to give up forgery and concentrate on his own work.

Despite his father's wishes, Harry takes the job and travels to Amsterdam to study Rembrandt. He decides to forge a never-discovered portrait of the master's blind father lost supposedly off the coast of Spain over 350 years ago. Harry continues his research in Paris, where he meets a beautiful Rembrandt scholar, Professor Marieke van den Broeck, who tells him she is a "student". Harry does not know that one of his main source books was written by Marieke. With her unwitting help, he gains access to an actual Rembrandt being restored at the Louvre from which he obtains scrapings of the original varnish. Soon Harry and Marieke become involved romantically.

Harry travels back to Amsterdam, where he paints his "Rembrandt" in an attic studio using period materials and a photograph of his own father as a model. He then journeys to Spain where he shows his three clients his forged masterpiece. After they find a local farmer who is paid to claim to have "found" the painting, the three clients invite two art experts to examine the painting, and they "confirm" it to be a Rembrandt. They return to London with the painting for a final authentication by a group of experts, which includes Marieke, to Harry's surprise. Several experts agree it is genuine, but Marieke does not. Dismayed to learn that his clients plan to hold a public auction, Harry tries to take back his painting but Davies pulls a modified Beretta handgun on him. Harry manages to evade his line of fire and makes his escape with the painting while Davies shoots and kills Agachi and frames Harry for the murder and the theft of the painting.

After eluding arrest, Harry finds Marieke, handcuffs her to his wrist, and together they escape on the Orient Express. Forced to flee the train by the pursuing police, they make their way through the English countryside, eventually splitting up before Harry is finally arrested while attempting to destroy his forgery at Mentmore Towers.

During his trial Harry tries to prove his innocence by duplicating the painting in open court to show that the painting is fake. His feelings, however, over his father's recent death and his wish for him to give up forgery prevent him from completing the painting. "Only Rembrandt can paint a Rembrandt," he concludes. Harry is saved when Hill, fearing his partner's homicidal intentions, testifies that Davies was actually the one who murdered Agachi. An enraged Davies is put in contempt and Harry is cleared of all charges.

After his release, Harry discovers that Hill plans to auction the painting himself and reap all the financial benefits. Having anticipated such an outcome, Harry had written a letter to the farmer in Spain notifying him of the deception. Spanish law allows the government first right of purchase from the discoverer of all treasures found on Spanish soil. The painting ends up in the Museo del Prado and the $55,000,000 that the painting was sold for end up in Spain. Of this money two thirds are taken by the Spanish government, half of the remaining sum is taken by the Church, and what is left is given to the farmer. In gratitude, the farmer invites Harry to Spain where he gives the artist half of the money—$5 million. Harry then travels back to Paris to meet Marieke. He gives her an original portrait that he painted of her in his own style. After signing the painting, the couple kiss and embrace on the romantic banks of the Seine.

== Cast ==
- Jason Patric as Harry Donovan
- Irene Jacob as Marieke van den Broeck
- Thomas Lockyer as Alastair Davies
- Ian Richardson as Turley (the prosecutor)
- Rod Steiger as Milton Donovan
- Ian Holm as John
- Togo Igawa as Agachi
- Simon Chandler as Ian Hill
- Pip Torrens as White (defense attorney)
- Michael Cochrane as Deeks
- Joseph Blatchley as Prof. Scheerding
- Paul Brennen as Det. Sgt. Steed
- Olivier Pierre as Lecuyer
- Peter Gale as Westerbrook
- David Marrick as Bright
- Dudley Sutton as Halifax/Offul
- Adam Fogerty as Ugo
- Ricardo Montez as Juan Del Campo
- Walter van Dyk as Thoolen

== Production ==
Filming took place in Paris, France; Mentmore Towers, Mentmore, Buckinghamshire, England; London, England; and Amsterdam, Netherlands. American artist James Gemmill painted the Rembrandt forgery for the film.

== Reception ==
Rotten Tomatoes, a review aggregator, reports that 33% of nine surveyed critics gave the film a positive review; the average rating is 5.1/10. Derek Elley of Variety wrote, "All of director John Badham's well-honed technique can't disguise the hollowness at the center of Incognito, a wannabe romantic thriller set in picture-postcard Europe that's short on romance and even shorter on thrills."
