= Nick of Time (film) =

1995 film by John Badham

- Theatrical release poster
- Directed by: John Badham
- Written by: Patrick Sheane Duncan
- Produced by: John Badham
- Starring: Johnny Depp; Christopher Walken; Charles S. Dutton; Peter Strauss; Roma Maffia; Gloria Reuben; Marsha Mason
- Cinematography: Roy H. Wagner
- Edited by: Frank Morriss; Kevin Stitt
- Music by: Arthur B. Rubinstein
- Production company: Paramount Pictures
- Distributed by: Paramount Pictures
- Release date: November 22, 1995
- Running time: 90 minutes
- Country: United States
- Language: English
- Budget: $33 million
- Box office: $8 million (United States)

Nick of Time is a 1995 American political action thriller film produced and directed by John Badham and written by Patrick Sheane Duncan. It stars Johnny Depp, Christopher Walken, Charles S. Dutton, and Courtney Chase. Taking place in real time, the film follows Gene Watson, a public accountant who must assassinate politician Governor Eleanor Grant in exchange for his kidnapped daughter Lynn's freedom. It was released theatrically in the United States by Paramount Pictures on November 22, 1995.

== Plot ==
Gene Watson, a mild-mannered accountant, arrives with his daughter Lynn at Union Station in Los Angeles. As Gene is using a payphone, two mysterious strangers in suits, known only as Mr. Smith and Ms. Jones, survey the station and discuss a yet-to-be-elaborated scheme. Noticing Gene retaliate against a skater who was harassing his daughter, Smith and Jones set their sights on him. Showing a badge, the two strangers convince Gene that they are police officers and whisk both father and daughter into a van without justification. Once inside, Gene begins to notice things are not right and gets nervous, but Smith subsequently pistol whips him in the knee. Smith then informs Gene that they will kill his daughter by 1:30 p.m. unless he murders a woman depicted in a photograph. He soon learns that the woman is Eleanor Grant, the governor of California.

At the Bonaventure Hotel, where a campaign appearance is scheduled, Gene makes several attempts to warn people about his situation. Smith consistently follows and harasses him, viciously beating him whenever he does not make a move. Gene manages to find a young campaign assistant, Krista Brooks, who believes his story and encourages him to report the matter to the governor's husband, Brendan Grant. Once in his suite, however, Brendan and a campaign lobbyist appear to disbelieve the story. Smith shows up in the room and fatally shoots Krista. Gene attacks Smith, but Smith overpowers him and chokes him unconscious. Gene wakes up and finds nearly everyone on the campaign, including the governor's staff and husband, is involved in the plot, with an unnamed lobbyist masterminding it all in revenge for the governor not carrying out her campaign promises to his interests.

Gene eventually finds shoe shiner named Huey and tries to tell him about the plot against the governor. While he initially does not believe Gene's story, Smith talks to Gene about the plot, believing Huey to be completely deaf, as his sign states he's a disabled Army veteran. Huey reluctantly helps Gene get to Grant's suite so he can warn her of the conspiracy. Although skeptical at first of his story, she later notices Brendan act suspiciously about Krista's whereabouts and realizes Gene is telling the truth. Being hastened by her husband to make a speech, the governor greets supporters in a ballroom when Gene takes out the gun, points it at a projector room where Smith is watching him, and shoots at the window. This unleashes a panic in the ballroom, causing a stampede and brief shootout between Gene and security staff. Thinking that his wife is dead, Brendan openly gloats about the plot's success, only to find out in horror that she had heard everything, confirming her suspicions about him.

In the meantime, Huey stalls the armed Jones, who is in the van with Lynn, with a squeegee man scheme to the point of a violent confrontation in which she shoots his prosthetic leg. Lynn tries to get out of the van when Smith opens the door; he begins to shoot at her. Right after she hides under the seat, Gene appears and shoots Smith. Ailing from his wounds, Smith congratulates Gene for becoming a killer before Gene fatally shoots him. Before Jones can get a clear shot at Gene and Lynn, Huey beats her unconscious with his wooden leg. The final scene shows the conspiracy mastermind stepping on Gene's broken wristwatch and leaving the hotel in a car.

An alternate TV scene (and on some DVD versions) also shows the governor thanking Gene and Huey for saving her life.

== Cast ==
- Johnny Depp as Gene Watson
- Christopher Walken as Mr. Smith
- Charles S. Dutton as Huey
- Roma Maffia as Ms. Jones
- Marsha Mason as Gov. Eleanor Grant
- Peter Strauss as Brendan Grant
- Gloria Reuben as Krista Brooks
- G.D. Spradlin as The Lobbyist
- Bill Smitrovich as Officer Trust
- Yul Vazquez as Gustino
- Edith Diaz as Irene
- Courtney Chase as Lynn Watson
- Tom Bradley as Himself
- Clark Johnson as Transportist

== Production ==
=== Filming ===
The majority of filming took place at the Westin Bonaventure Hotel in Downtown Los Angeles, California, from April 2 to June 19, 1995.

== Reception ==
=== Box office ===
A box office bomb, it grossed $8 million on a $33 million budget.

=== Critical reception ===
Nick of Time received mostly negative reviews from critics. Based on 33 reviews collected from notable publications by review aggregator Rotten Tomatoes, the film holds an overall approval rating of 30% and an average score of 4.6/10. The site's consensus reads: "It isn't the worst '90s action thriller, but by bungling a story pitting Johnny Depp against Christopher Walken, the rote Nick of Time ranks among the most disappointing". Audiences polled by CinemaScore gave the film an average grade of "B" on an A+ to F scale.

A more positive review came from Roger Ebert in the Chicago Sun-Times, who gave the film 2.5 stars out of 4. He wrote the film was "too contrived" in places but lauded Depp's performance for bringing "a low-key ordinariness" and liked his character's use of intelligence rather than action film cliches to solve his dilemma.

== Soundtrack ==
The film's score – composed by Arthur B. Rubinstein – was released by Milan Records on November 22, 1995.

== Legacy ==
The plot of Bollywood film Baadshah is loosely based on this film.
