= The Fast and the Furious (2001 film) =

2001 film by Rob Cohen

- Theatrical release poster
- Directed by: Rob Cohen
- Screenplay by: Gary Scott Thompson; Erik Bergquist; David Ayer
- Story by: Gary Scott Thompson
- Based on: "Racer X" by Ken Li
- Produced by: Neal H. Moritz
- Starring: Paul Walker; Vin Diesel; Michelle Rodriguez; Jordana Brewster; Rick Yune; Chad Lindberg; Johnny Strong; Ted Levine
- Cinematography: Ericson Core
- Edited by: Peter Honess
- Music by: BT
- Production companies: Universal Pictures; Neal H. Moritz Productions; Mediastream Film
- Distributed by: Universal Pictures (United States); United International Pictures (International)
- Release dates: June 18, 2001 (Mann Village Theatre); June 22, 2001 (United States)
- Running time: 107 minutes
- Countries: United States; Germany
- Language: English
- Budget: $38 million
- Box office: $212.6 million

The Fast and the Furious is a 2001 action film directed by Rob Cohen, and written by Gary Scott Thompson, Erik Bergquist, and David Ayer, based on the 1998 Vibe magazine article "Racer X" by Ken Li. The first installment in the Fast & Furious franchise, it stars Paul Walker, Vin Diesel, Michelle Rodriguez, Jordana Brewster, Rick Yune, Chad Lindberg, Johnny Strong, and Ted Levine. In the film, undercover cop Brian O'Conner (Walker) infiltrates a street racing crew to investigate a series of hijackings and finds himself developing a complex friendship with the group's leader, Dominic Toretto (Diesel).

The Fast and the Furious entered development in late 1998, its concept inspired by Li's 1998 Vibe article about the illegal street racing scene of New York City at the time. Thompson and Bergquist wrote the original screenplay that year, with Ayer hired soon after. Various actors were considered for the roles of O'Conner and Toretto, with Walker cast in 1998 and then Diesel in early 1999, with the pair attending actual street races in preparation for the film. A co-production between the United States and Germany, principal photography took place in Los Angeles and Southern California. Record producer BT was hired to compose the score.

The Fast and the Furious premiered at the Mann Village Theatre in Los Angeles on June 18, 2001, and was released in the United States on June 22, by Universal Pictures. Critics praised the action sequences and the performances but criticized its story; the film is considered Diesel's, Walker's, and Rodriguez's breakthrough roles. The Fast and the Furious grossed $212 million worldwide on a $38 million budget. The film's success spawned a franchise consisting of 10 sequels, a spin-off film, a standalone TV series, and several video games. It was followed by 2 Fast 2 Furious in 2003.

== Plot ==
At the Los Angeles port, a heist crew driving three heavily modified Honda Civics hijack a semi-truck trailer carrying electronic goods and escape into the night along the Terminal Island Freeway. Meanwhile, LAPD officer Brian O'Conner is sent undercover as part of a joint LAPD-FBI task force to locate the crew responsible. Brian investigates Toretto's Market & Cafe, managed by Mia, sister of notorious street racer Dominic "Dom" Toretto. When Dom's crew arrives—Vince, Leon, Jesse, and Dom's girlfriend Letty—Vince becomes suspicious of Brian and picks a fight with him. As a result of the fight, Dom threatens to fire Brian from his undercover job at Harry's garage and ban him from the market, but Harry manages to reason with him and keep Brian employed.

Brian brings a modified 1995 Mitsubishi Eclipse RS to a car meet, hoping to find a lead on the heist crew. Dom arrives in his Mazda RX-7 and initiates a race. Without credibility, Brian wagers his car; he, Dom, and two other drivers race. Brian's car malfunctions and Dom wins the race, but LAPD officers arrive, forcing Dom to flee. Brian rescues him, helping him escape, inadvertently venturing into territory held by a rival racing gang led by Johnny Tran and his cousin Lance. Tran and Lance destroy the Eclipse, and the two are forced to return to Dom's home in a cab. Dom reiterates that Brian still owes him a ten-second car.

Brian delivers a decrepit MK4 Toyota Supra to Dom's garage, and the crew begins the process of restoring it. At the same time, he begins dating Mia and looks into Tran's finances.

Hector comes to Harry’s garage and speaks to Brian with the intent to buy performance parts for Honda Civics. While Brian is investigating one of Hector's garages, looking for the Civics that have been involved in the heists, Brian is discovered by Dom and Vince; he convinces the latter he is researching Tran's gang's vehicles in preparation for Race Wars.

In the process, the three discover a large number of electronic goods, which Brian reports to his superiors, LAPD Sergeant Tanner and FBI Special Agent Bilkins. A SWAT team arrests Tran, but he is found to have acquired the goods legally. An enraged Bilkins berates Tanner and Brian. Bilkins then informs Brian that the truck drivers have begun arming themselves to kill the hijackers and notifies him that he has 36 hours to find them, whom the former believes was Dom all along. Brian and Dom attend Race Wars, where Jesse wagers and loses his father's MK3 Volkswagen Jetta in a drag race against Tran driving his Honda S2000. Jesse flees upon losing, resulting in a confrontation between Dom and Tran. Tran accuses Dom of being a narc, and the two fight before being broken up.

That evening, Brian witnesses Dom leaving with his crew to carry out the heist. Brian reveals his identity to a distraught Mia, convincing her to help him, knowing their danger. Dom, Letty, Vince, and Leon attempt to hijack the truck; the driver fires on Vince, critically injuring him and running Letty off the road in the process. Brian and Mia catch up to help, but Brian is forced to reveal his identity when he calls for MEDEVAC to save Vince. Dom, Mia, Letty, and Leon flee the scene before the police arrive.

Later, Brian arrives to arrest Dom, but the latter demands he leave in order to save Jesse from the danger he's in from Tran's gang. Jesse arrives, pleading for help, but he is gunned down by Tran and Lance on motorcycles. Brian foregoes his arrest of Dom and gives pursuit to Tran and Lance, with Dom getting into his father's 1970 Dodge Charger R/T to pursue Tran and avenge Jesse. During the chase, Dom runs Lance off the road before Brian shoots and kills Tran.

Brian then pursues Dom, and the two agree to a quarter-mile race over a railroad crossing. The race narrowly ends in a draw, but Dom is t-boned by a passing truck. Instead of arresting him, Brian hands over the keys to his Supra, reminding Dom he was owed a ten-second car. He walks away as Dom drives off.

In the post-credits scene, Dom is driving through Baja California, Mexico, in a 1970 Chevrolet Chevelle SS.

== Cast ==
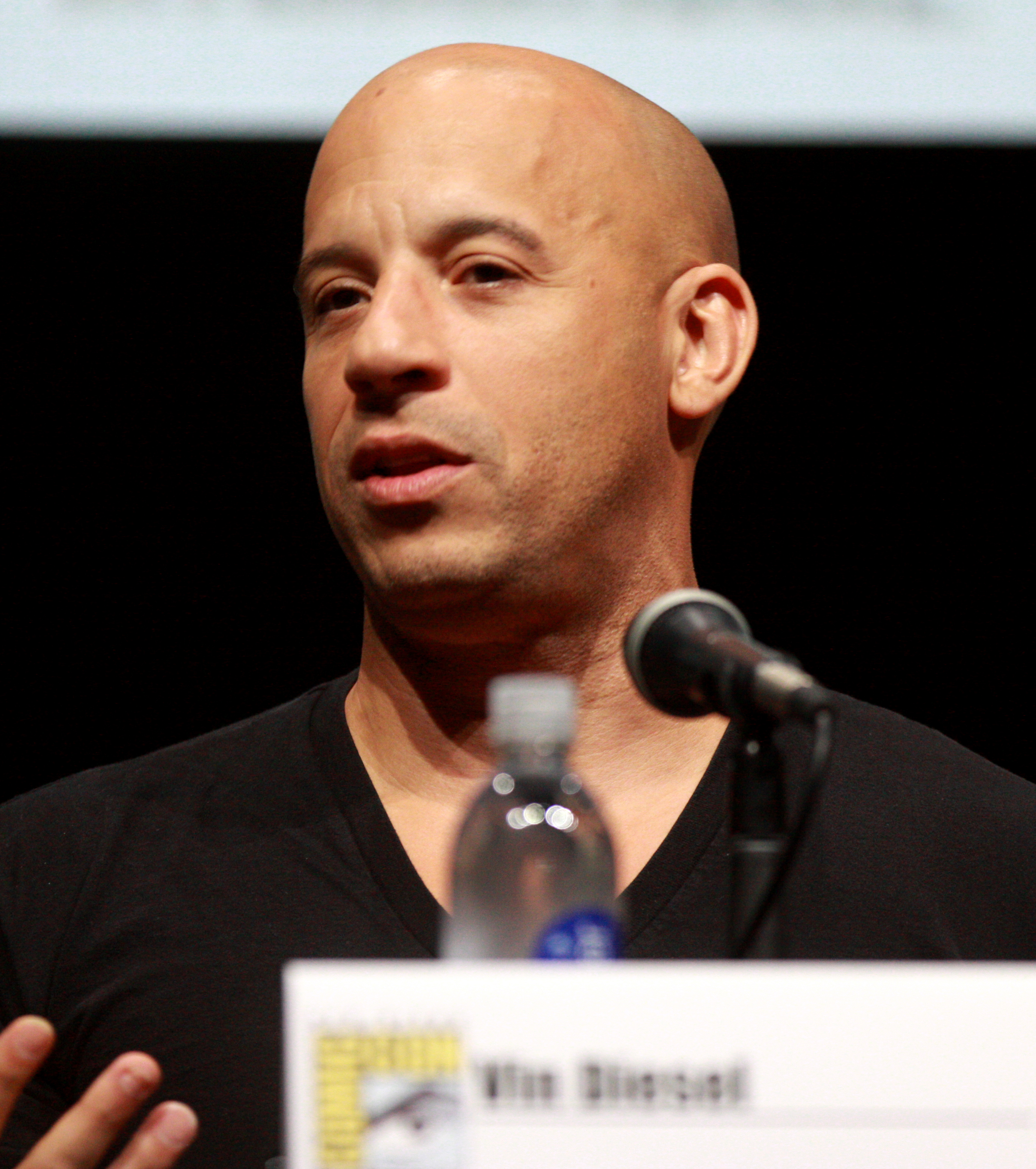
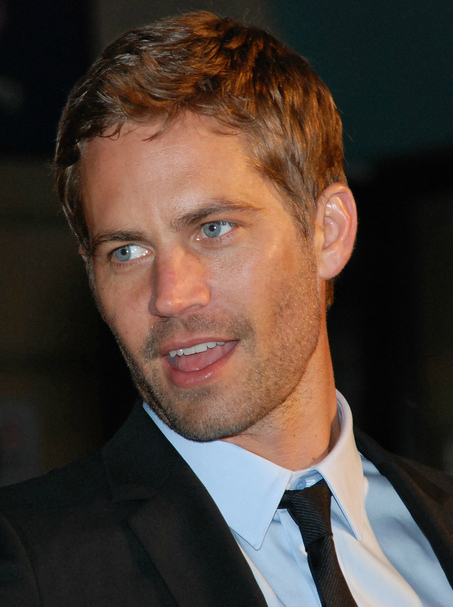
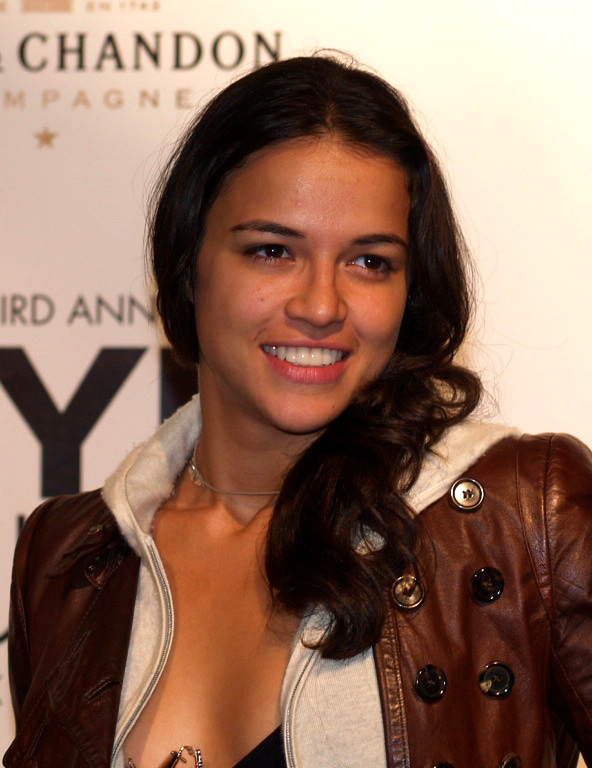
Vin Diesel (left) in 2013, Paul Walker in 2009, and Michelle Rodriguez in 2006
- Paul Walker as Brian O'Conner:
  An LAPD police officer sent to infiltrate a crew of hijackers and also Mia's primary love interest.
- Vin Diesel as Dominic Toretto:
  Leader of the heist crew and a professional street racer. He was banned from professional racing after a violent retaliatory attack on the man he believed had accidentally killed his father.
- Michelle Rodriguez as Letty Ortiz:
  A member of Dom's crew and his girlfriend.
- Jordana Brewster as Mia Toretto:
  Dom's sister and owner of the Toretto general store. Brian's love interest.
- Rick Yune as Johnny Tran:
  A Vietnamese gang leader and rival of Dom.
- Chad Lindberg as Jesse:
  A member of Dom's crew. Highly intelligent with math, algebra, and computing, but he dropped out of school due to his attention deficit disorder.
- Johnny Strong as Leon:
  A member of Dom's crew.

The central cast is rounded out by Ted Levine and Thom Barry as Tanner and Bilkins, respectively, members of the team that organized the investigation to place Brian undercover, and Matt Schulze as Vince, a member of Dom's crew and his childhood friend. Noel Gugliemi appears as Hector, the organizer of the drag race. Musician and rapper Ja Rule and car tuner R.J. de Vera also act as Edwin and Danny, fellow drivers at the drag race who race against Dom and Brian. Vyto Ruginis plays Harry, an informant and owner of The Racer's Edge. Reggie Lee portrays Lance Nguyen, Tran's cousin, and right-hand man. Neal H. Moritz and Rob Cohen both appear in cameos; Moritz plays an unnamed driver of a black Ferrari F355 convertible who is given a challenge by Brian, while Cohen plays a Pizza Hut delivery man.

== Production ==
=== Development ===
Actor Paul Walker had worked with director Rob Cohen on The Skulls. Cohen secured a deal with producer Neal H. Moritz for an untitled action film for Universal Pictures, and approached Walker and asked him to suggest his "dream" action film; Walker suggested a mash-up of the films Days of Thunder (1990) and Donnie Brasco (1997). Soon thereafter, Cohen and Moritz brought him the Vibe magazine article "Racer X" by Ken Li, published in May 1998, which detailed underground street racing operating in New York City, and suggested a story set to follow Walker as an undercover cop tasked with infiltrating the world of underground street racing. The screenplay was originally developed by Gary Scott Thompson and Erik Bergquist. David Ayer was brought into the project to help rework the script. Ayer changed it from the "mostly white and suburban story" set in New York to a diverse one set in Los Angeles.

Upon being offered the role, Walker signed on immediately. Eminem was offered the role, but turned it down to work on the film 8 Mile (2002), and Mark Wahlberg and Christian Bale were also considered. Originally, the studio told the producers they would green-light the film if they could get Timothy Olyphant to play the role of Dominic Toretto. Olyphant, however, who had starred in the previous year's car-themed film Gone in 60 Seconds, declined the role. Olyphant said that he turned down the role as he thought the film would be "stupid". Moritz instead suggested Vin Diesel, who had to be convinced to take the role even though he had only played supporting roles up to that point. The role of Mia Toretto was originally written for Eliza Dushku, who declined it, and Sarah Michelle Gellar, Jessica Biel, Kirsten Dunst, and Natalie Portman auditioned before Jordana Brewster was cast.

Moritz had difficulty choosing between the titles Racer X (after the article), Redline, Race Wars and Street Wars, but was ultimately inspired by a documentary on American International Pictures, which included the 1954 film The Fast and the Furious. Moritz was traded use of some stock footage to its director, Roger Corman, in exchange for a license to use the title.

=== Filming ===
The film was shot in various locations within Los Angeles and parts of Southern California. Key locations included Dodger Stadium (the opening scene where Brian tests his Eclipse in the parking lot), Angelino Heights, Silver Lake and Echo Park (the neighborhoods around the Toretto house), as well as Little Saigon (where Tran destroys the Eclipse) and the San Bernardino International Airport (the venue for Race Wars, which attracted over 1,500 import car owners and enthusiasts). The entire last rig heist scene was filmed along Domenigoni Parkway on the southern side of San Jacinto/Hemet in the San Jacinto Valley near Diamond Valley Lake.

Before filming, both Jordana Brewster and Michelle Rodriguez did not have driver's licenses, so they took driving lessons during production. For the climactic race scene between Brian and Dom, separate shots of both cars crossing the railroad and the train crossing the street were filmed, then composited together to give the illusion of the train narrowly missing the cars. A long steel rod was used as a ramp for Dom's car to crash through the semi-truck and fly in mid-air. During filming, 78 cars were wrecked both on and off-screen, of which 3 cars were shown being destroyed in the film's trailer alone. During production, stunt coordinator and second unit director Mic Rodgers developed a vehicle named the “Mic Rig” in collaboration with special effects coordinator Matt Sweeney and the rest of the film's special effects department.

=== Music ===
The film's score was composed by music producer BT, mixing electronica with hip-hop and industrial influences. Three soundtracks were released for the film. The first one features mostly hip-hop and rap music. The second one, titled More Fast and Furious, features alternative metal, post-grunge and nu metal songs, as well as select tracks from BT's score. The third and final one, an original score album by BT, was released by Binary Acoustics in February 2026.

== Release ==
The Fast and the Furious premiered at the Mann Village Theatre in Los Angeles on June 18, 2001. It was then released to theaters in the United States on June 22, 2001.

=== Home media ===
The Fast and the Furious was released on DVD and VHS on January 2, 2002. The DVD release sold 2.1 million copies during its first day of release, making it the second-highest single-day DVD sales of any film, behind Pearl Harbor. The film also made $18.65 million in video store rental revenue in its first week, a record at the time, beating Cast Away. It was later surpassed by Harry Potter and the Sorcerer's Stone in May. More than 5.5 million home video units were sold by April 2002. A second DVD release, dubbed the "Tricked Out Edition", was released on June 3, 2003, and features The Turbo Charged Prelude for 2 Fast 2 Furious, a short film that set the tone of the film's sequel. An abridged version of the short film is also on the sequel's DVD release.

An alternate ending titled "More Than Furious" was filmed, in which Tanner drops Brian off at the Toretto house, where he encounters Mia packing, intending to move away. Brian reveals that he resigned from the LAPD, who let him go quietly, and that he wants another chance with her. When Mia tells him that it is not going to be that simple, Brian tells her that he has time. This ending was released in the collection bundle DVD version.

=== Merchandising ===
Racing Champions released diecast metal replicas of the film's cars in different scales from 1/18 to 1/64. RadioShack sold ZipZaps micro RC versions of the cars in 2002. 1/24 scale plastic model kits of the hero cars were manufactured by AMT Ertl.

A video game was planned for a release in 2003 for the PlayStation 2 and Xbox by Vivendi Universal. Two other video games were released in 2004: a mobile game and an arcade game both titled The Fast and the Furious. The arcade game was ported to the Wii as Cruis'n in 2007.

== Reception ==
=== Box office ===
The Fast and the Furious earned $40,089,015 during its opening weekend and ranked #1 at the box office ahead of Dr. Dolittle 2, Lara Croft: Tomb Raider and Atlantis: The Lost Empire. The film became one of the four consecutive Universal films of 2001 to gross $40 million in their opening weekends, with the others being Jurassic Park III, American Pie 2 and The Mummy Returns. Its widest release was 2,889 theaters. During its run, the film made $148,961,825 in North America, along with $63,686,572 internationally, for a worldwide total gross of $212,648,856 on a budget of $38 million.

In the United Kingdom, the film ranked in second place at the box office behind Moulin Rouge!, collecting $2.6 million during its opening weekend.

=== Critical response ===
On Rotten Tomatoes, the film has an approval rating of 56% based on 159 reviews, and an average rating of 5.40/10. The website's critical consensus reads: "Sleek and shiny on the surface, The Fast and the Furious recalls those cheesy teenage exploitation flicks of the 1950s." On Metacritic, the film has a weighted average score of 58 out of 100 based on 29 critics, indicating "mixed or average reviews". Audiences surveyed by CinemaScore gave the film an average grade of "B+" on an A+ to F scale.

Todd McCarthy of Variety called the film "a gritty and gratifying cheap thrill, Rob Cohen's high-octane hot-car meller is a true rarity these days, a really good exploitationer, the sort of thing that would rule at drive-ins if they still existed." Kevin Thomas of the Los Angeles Times called it "an action picture that's surprising in the complexity of its key characters and portents of tragedy." Vin Diesel's portrayal of Dominic Torretto won praise, with Reece Pendleton of the Chicago Reader writing that "Diesel carries the movie with his unsettling mix of Zen-like tranquillity and barely controlled rage." Future franchise director Louis Leterrier and star Jason Statham went to watch the film in Paris in 2001 while on a break from filming The Transporter (2002), and praised it.

Other reviews were more mixed. Susan Wloszczyna of USA Today gave the film 2 1/2 out of 4 stars, saying that Cohen "at least knows how to keep matters moving and the action sequences exciting." Owen Gleiberman of Entertainment Weekly gave the film a C, saying it "works hard to be exciting, but the movie scarcely lives up to its title." Elvis Mitchell of The New York Times stated "such a drag that it ends up doing something hard to imagine: it makes you long for the soulless professionalism of a Jerry Bruckheimer movie." Rita Kempley of The Washington Post gave the film a scathing review, calling it "Rebel Without a Cause without a cause. The Young and the Restless with gas fumes. The Quick and the Dead with skid marks." Paul Clinton of CNN wrote that Cohen "created a high-octane, rubber-burning extravaganza" but he criticized the film for "plot holes you could drive the proverbial truck through" and an "idiotic" ending. Reviewers pointed out the plot’s similarities to Kathryn Bigelow’s 1991 film Point Break with Andrew Anthony of The Observer calling it “essentially a remake”.

=== Accolades ===
| Award | Category | Nominee | Result |
|---|---|---|---|
| AFI Award | Cinematographer of the Year | Ericson Core | Nominated |
| ALMA Award | Outstanding Song in a Motion Picture Soundtrack | The Fast and the Furious for the song "Put It On Me" | Nominated |
| ASCAP Award | Most Performed Songs from Motion Pictures | Ja Rule for the song "Put It On Me" | Won |
| Black Reel | Theatrical – Best Actor | Vin Diesel | Nominated |
| BMI Film Music Award | | BT | Won |
| Golden Trailer | Best Action | The Fast and the Furious | Nominated |
| Hollywood Breakthrough Award | Breakthrough Male Performance | Paul Walker | Won |
| Golden Reel Award (Motion Picture Sound Editors) | Best Sound Editing – Effects & Foley, Domestic Feature Film | Bruce Stambler (supervising sound editor/sound designer); Jay Nierenberg (supervising sound editor); Michael Dressel (supervising Foley editor); Steve Mann (sound effects editor); Kim Secrist (sound effects editor); Steve Nelson (sound effects editor); Howard Neiman (sound effects editor); Glenn Hoskinson (sound effects editor); Tim Walston (sound designer); Charles Deenen (sound designer); Scott Curtis (Foley editor); Dan Yale (Foley editor) | Nominated |
| Golden Reel Award (Motion Picture Sound Editors) | Best Sound Editing – Dialogue & ADR, Domestic Feature Film | Bruce Stambler (supervising sound editor/sound designer); Jay Nierenberg (supervising sound editor); Becky Sullivan (supervising dialogue editor/supervising ADR editor); Mildred Iatrou (dialogue editor); Donald L. Warner Jr. (dialogue editor); Robert Troy (dialogue editor); Paul Curtis (dialogue editor); William Dotson (dialogue editor); Cathie Speakman (dialogue editor); Nicholas Vincent Korda (ADR editor); Lee Lemont (ADR editor) | Nominated |
| MTV Movie Award | Best On-Screen Team | Vin Diesel; Paul Walker | Won |
| MTV Movie Award | Best Movie | The Fast and the Furious | Nominated |
| MTV Movie Award | Best Male Performance | Vin Diesel | Nominated |
| MTV Movie Award | Breakthrough Male Performance | Paul Walker | Nominated |
| MTV Movie Award | Best Action Sequence | The Fast and the Furious | Nominated |
| Stinkers Award | Most Intrusive Musical Score | | Won |
| Taurus Award | Best Driving | Matt Johnston; Mike Justus; Debbie Evans; Tim Trella; Christopher J. Tuck; Kevin Scott (semi driver) | Won |
| Taurus Award | Best Work With a Vehicle | Christopher J. Tuck; Mike Justus | Won |
| Taurus Award | Best Stunt by a Stunt Woman | Debbie Evans | Won |
| Taurus Award | Best Stunt by a Stunt Man | Christopher J. Tuck; Tim Trella | Won |
| Taurus Award | Best Stunt Coordinator and/or 2nd Unit Director: Feature Film | Mic Rodgers | Won |
| Taurus Award | Best Work With a Vehicle | Jimmy N. Roberts | Nominated |
| Taurus Award | Hardest Hit | Mike Justus | Nominated |
| Teen Choice Awards | Choice Movie: Sleazebag | Rick Yune | Nominated |
| Teen Choice Awards | Choice Movie: Hissy Fit | Vin Diesel | Nominated |
| Teen Choice Awards | Choice Movie: Fight Scene | Paul Walker vs. Rick Yune | Nominated |
| Teen Choice Awards | Choice Summer Movie | The Fast and the Furious | Nominated |

== Sequel ==
The film shattered box office expectations and a sequel, 2 Fast 2 Furious, was green-lit immediately. Diesel and Cohen declined to return for the sequel, opting to develop the film XXX (2002), which starred Diesel in the lead role. To account for these changes, Universal commissioned the writers to create a standalone sequel with Walker in the lead and brought in John Singleton as the new director.
