= Another Stakeout =

1993 film by John Badham

- Theatrical release poster
- Directed by: John Badham
- Written by: Jim Kouf
- Produced by: Lynn Bigelow; Jim Kouf; Cathleen Summers
- Starring: Richard Dreyfuss; Emilio Estevez; Rosie O'Donnell; Cathy Moriarty; Dennis Farina; Marcia Strassman
- Cinematography: Roy H. Wagner
- Edited by: Frank Morriss
- Music by: Arthur B. Rubinstein
- Production company: Touchstone Pictures
- Distributed by: Buena Vista Pictures Distribution
- Release date: July 23, 1993
- Running time: 109 minutes
- Country: United States
- Language: English
- Budget: $30 million
- Box office: $30 million (worldwide)

Another Stakeout is a 1993 American buddy cop action comedy film directed by John Badham and starring Richard Dreyfuss, Emilio Estevez, and Rosie O'Donnell. It is a sequel to the 1987 film, Stakeout. Unlike its predecessor, the film was neither a critical nor a commercial success.

== Plot ==
Luella Delano, a witness against the Mafia, is being hidden in the desert until the trial. Tony Castellano, a hitman, blows up the house using a sewage removal truck to pump gas under it. The violent attempt against her kills her husband Mike, several of her guards and she disappears.

Chris Lecce and Bill Reimers, after an undercover detail goes wrong (the man who has been killing homeless people gets shot with Chris's gun), are called upon to stake out the lakeside home where Luella is believed to be.

Unlike their earlier stakeout, this time they are accompanied by assistant DA Gina Garrett and her pet rottweiler Archie. Their cover is husband, wife, and son.

When Chris arrives home, his girlfriend Maria McGuire is kicking him out, as he will not marry her, although they have been together for six years. Chris does not want to, as his family has the worst track record in marriage, including his own divorce.

However, Chris, Bill, and Gina must continue with their stakeout of Luella's friends Brian and Pam O'Hara to make sure Luella is safe. The trio are given use of a red convertible and Judge Dave Hoberman's summer house next to the O'Hara's as cover.

The trio meet the couple upon arrival, as Archie chases a cat onto their property. Bill sends Gina for a run after Brian the next morning. When all three are not watching, the O'Haras leave the house. Bill sneaks in to bug the place, but has to abort the mission.

Gina invites the O'Haras to their house that night for a dinner party so Bill can plant several bugs around theirs. She and Chris freak out the couple by acting odd. Then things take a turn for the worse when Bill is knocked unconscious after being mistaken for a hit man.

Luella has subdued Bill, not knowing he is there to protect her. Her friends, the O'Haras find her with the bound, gagged and hooded man, who she insists they must kill. As she is about to shoot him at the end of the pier, he flips off it, freeing himself.

Gina and Chris appear, subduing Luella. In custody, she asks to talk to the O'Haras in person. Chris and Bill are packing up to leave when they spot Tony. Hurrying to warn them in the other house, there they are initially shot at as Luella insists it is they who are the hitmen.

Tony kills the corrupt District Attorney Tommy Hassrick for his interference. Then he takes Gina hostage, despite Chris and Bill having their guns drawn. While walking Gina at gunpoint past the pool in pursuit of Luella, Tony is attacked by Archie for threatening Gina and they both fall into the pool. He shoots at Luella but hits Gina in the shoulder instead, then gets shot and killed by Chris and Bill.

Both Chris and Bill are congratulated as heroes by the FBI, Luella and Gina. Chris returns to his apartment to call Maria, but she is already there. He proposes and she accepts, while Bill watches through binoculars from the car.

== Cast ==
- Richard Dreyfuss as Detective Chris Lecce
- Emilio Estevez as Detective Bill Reimers
- Rosie O'Donnell as Assistant District Attorney Gina Garrett
- Dennis Farina as Brian O'Hara
- Marcia Strassman as Pam O'Hara
- Cathy Moriarty as Luella "Lu" Delano
- John Rubinstein as District Attorney Tommy Hassrick
- Miguel Ferrer as Tony Castellano
- Sharon Maughan as Barbara Burnside
- Christopher Doyle as McNamara
- Sharon Schaffer as Tilghman
- Jan Speck as Van Agent
- Frank C. Turner as "Unlucky"
- Dan Lauria as Captain Phil Coldshank
- Denalda Williams as Desk Sergeant
- Larry B. Scott as Garage Attendant
- Blu Mankuma as Detective Wills
- Thomas Mitchell as Detective Gilliam
- Scott Anderson as Reynaldo McGuire
- Michael DeLano as Mike Delano
- Steve Bacic as Frank
- Madeleine Stowe as Maria McGuire

== Reception ==
On Rotten Tomatoes the film holds an approval rating of 16% based on 25 reviews, with an average rating of 4.48/10. Metacritic, which uses a weighted average, assigned the film a score of 53 out of 100, based on 26 critics, indicating "mixed or average" reviews. Audiences polled by CinemaScore gave the film an average grade of "B+" on an A+ to F scale.

Film critic Roger Ebert gave the film three stars in his review, the same as his rating for the first film, describing it as "chewing gum for the mind. This one holds its flavor better than most." Michael Wilmington of the Los Angeles Times wrote: "Another Stakeout (MPAA rated PG-13, for two comic-action violence scenes) is neither the best nor worst of a bloated lot of unimaginative sequels. It's pretty much what it's [sic] title suggests: another stakeout, another sequel. Another day, another dollar."

=== Box office ===
The sequel debuted at number 9 at the US box office with $5.4 million in its opening weekend. It eventually grossed just $20.2 million in the United States and Canada and $9.4 million internationally, for a worldwide total of $29.6 million, less than its $30 million budget.
