= The Law (1974 film) =

- Title card
- Genre: Crime; Drama
- Teleplay by: Joel Oliansky
- Story by: Joel Oliansky; William Sackheim
- Directed by: John Badham
- Starring: Judd Hirsch; John Beck
- Country of origin: United States
- Original language: English

Production
- Producers: William Sackheim; Michael Rhodes
- Cinematography: Michael D. Margulies
- Editor: Frank Morriss
- Running time: 124 minutes
- Production company: Universal Television

Original release
- Network: NBC
- Release: October 22, 1974

The Law is a 1974 Universal Television made-for-television film directed by John Badham starring Judd Hirsch as defense attorney Murray Stone with John Beck, Bonnie Franklin and Gary Busey.

== Plot ==
The workings of a big city's legal system are seen through the eyes of people involved in a sensational murder trial.

== Cast ==
- Judd Hirsch as Murray Stone
- John Beck as Gene Carey
- Bonnie Franklin as Bobbie Stone
- Barbara Baxley as Judge Rebeccah Fornier
- Sam Wanamaker as Jules Benson
- Allan Arbus as Leonard Caporni
- John Hillerman as Thomas Q. Rachel
- Gary Busey as William Bright
- Gerald Hiken as Judge Arnold Lerner
- Michael Bell as Cliff Wilson
- Herbert Jefferson Jr. as Maxwell Fall
- Frank Marth as Arthur Winchell
- John Sylvester White as Judge Philip Shields
- Robert Q. Lewis as Speaker at Bar Dinner
- Logan Ramsey as Raymond Bleisch
- Sandy Ward as Hoak
- George Wyner as Deputy D.A. Piper
- Ernie Anderson as Barry Hale - TV News Anchor
- Reb Brown as Tommy Cicero
- Dennis Burkley as Monty Leese
- Don Calfa as Rod Brainard
- Helen Page Camp as Mrs. Bright
- Alex Colon as Felix Esquivel
- Regis Cordic as Raymond Churchill
- Ted Gehring as Detective Sargeant Manfred
- Corey Fischer as Nicholson
- Pamela Hensley as Cindy Best
- Milt Kogan as Detective Milt Vinton
- Luis Moreno as Melendez
- Joel Oliansky as Wystan Lanier
- Eugene Peterson as Leon Zuckerwaar
- Anne Ramsey as Eleanor Bleisch
- Brad Sullivan as Officer Newberg
- Keith Walker as Dwight Healy
- Charlie White as Gordon Riefler
- Alex Wilson as Mrozek
- Henry Brown as Reynaldo Williams

== 1975 miniseries ==
A 1975 TV miniseries of three further hour-long episodes was created for Hirsch's character, each directed by writer Joel Oliansky:

- "Complaint Amended", March 19, 1975
- "Prior Consent", March 26, 1975
- "Special Circumstances", April 16, 1975
