= Evel Knievel (2004 film) =

2004 American television film

- Film poster
- Genre: Drama
- Based on: Evel Incarnate: The Life and Legend of Evel Knievel by Steve Mandich
- Teleplay by: Jason Horwitch
- Directed by: John Badham
- Starring: George Eads; Jaime Pressly; Lance Henriksen; Fred Thompson; Beau Bridges
- Music by: Stewart Copeland
- Country of origin: United States
- Original language: English

Production
- Executive producers: Bruce Davey; Michael Jaffe; Howard Braunstein; Jan Korbelin
- Producers: Nancy Cotton; Clara George
- Cinematography: Ron Stannett
- Editor: Frank Morriss
- Running time: 91 minutes
- Production companies: Icon Productions; Jaffe/Braunstein Films; ApolloProScreen Filmproduktion

Original release
- Network: TNT
- Release: July 30, 2004

Evel Knievel is a 2004 American drama film directed by John Badham and written by Jason Horwitch, about American stunt performer and entertainer Evel Knievel. Based on the 2000 biography Evel Incarnate by Steve Mandich, the film stars George Eads as Knievel, with Jaime Pressly, Lance Henriksen, Fred Thompson, Beau Bridges, Matt Gordon and Peter MacNeill. The film premiered on TNT on July 30, 2004.

== Plot ==
The film begins with Evel Knievel preparing to jump the fountains at Caesars Palace in front of a large audience. A flashback to Butte, Montana in 1950, 12-year-old Bobby Knievel steals some hubcaps and then escapes on his bicycle before being caught and arrested. In 1958, while working for the Anaconda Mining Company, he observes the lung damage affecting the older miners and resolves to make a living performing motorcycle stunts instead. He meets Linda Bork, whose friends advise her to stay away from him. They marry and have two children, Kelly and Robbie, as Knievel's reputation as a stunt rider grows.

Knievel makes a deal to jump the fountains at Caesars Palace on New Years Eve 1967 (subtitled with the incorrect date of 1968 and using Lynyrd Skynyrd's 1974 song "Call Me the Breeze"). John Derek and his wife Linda Evans film the event. Knievel's assistant Bill tries to keep alcohol away from him but Knievel finds it and drinks some. He clears the fountains but tumbles off of his motorcycle from the force of the landing. He breaks many bones, including his pelvis, and falls into a coma. Linda stays with him at the hospital until he awakens. The doctors tell her that they have inserted metal rods to hold his bones in place and that Knievel will never be able to jump again but when he leaves the hospital he continues to tell the press that he will jump the Grand Canyon. Knievel fights with Linda over his desire to return to doing stunts.

In 1970, an employee of the Ideal Toy Company attends an event where he witnesses Knievel get into a fight with bikers after one throws a tire iron at him. Knievel's fans attack the bikers and injure several. Recognizing his broad appeal, Ideal creates a line of Evel Knievel action figures. During a rafting trip, Knievel, his two sons, and his father-in-law John Bork fall out of the raft. Knievel is unable to reach John, who is carried away by the river and dies.

On August 20, 1974, at the Canadian National Exhibition, Knievel has his sons Kelly and Robbie ride as part of the performance. Unable to get a permit to jump the Grand Canyon, Knievel conducts test jumps over Snake River Canyon using rockets. The jump is broadcast on closed-circuit television on September 8, 1974, and Knievel gets into a fight with one of the reporters before the jump. He ultimately uses the Skycycle X-2 for the jump but the parachute deploys early and the drag prevents Knievel from reaching his intended landing spot. He instead crashes into the river bank at the bottom of the canyon but manages to survive. The public is dissatisfied and the media criticizes his effort.

In October 1975, Knievel performs his second stunt since the failed jump over Snake River Canyon. He jumps fourteen buses at Kings Island in Mason, Ohio to break his previous record. He retires from motorcycle jumping in 1980 and moves to Florida. The film ends with a compilation of footage of Knievel's jumps and crashes.

== Cast ==
- George Eads as Evel Knievel
  - Jake Brockman as Young Bobby "Evel" Knievel
- Jaime Pressly as Linda Bork
- Lance Henriksen as William "Awful" Knoffel
- Fred Thompson as Jay Sarno
- Beau Bridges as John Bork
- Matt Gordon as Phil
- Peter MacNeill as Pettibone
- Maggie Butterfield as Ethel Bork
- Brayden Jones as Kelly Knievel
  - Connor Price as Younger Kelly Knievel
- Riley Jones as Robbie Knievel
  - Thomas Price as Younger Robbie Knievel
- Madeleine Butler as Tracey Knievel
  - Elle Dhanani as Younger Tracey
- Stefan Brogren as Bob Truax
- Jessica Greco as Charmaine
- Alan van Sprang as John Derek
- Nicola Jones as Linda Evans
- Carlos Diaz as D.J. Caruso
- Arnold Pinnock as Pryor
- Eli Gabay as Arum
- Doug Hadders as Bob Wolfe
- Jacqueline Pillon as Snake River Reporter
- Marieve Herington as Candy Striper

== Production ==
Filming took place in Toronto.

== See also ==
- List of American films of 2004
