= Jim Kouf =

American screenwriter, director and producer

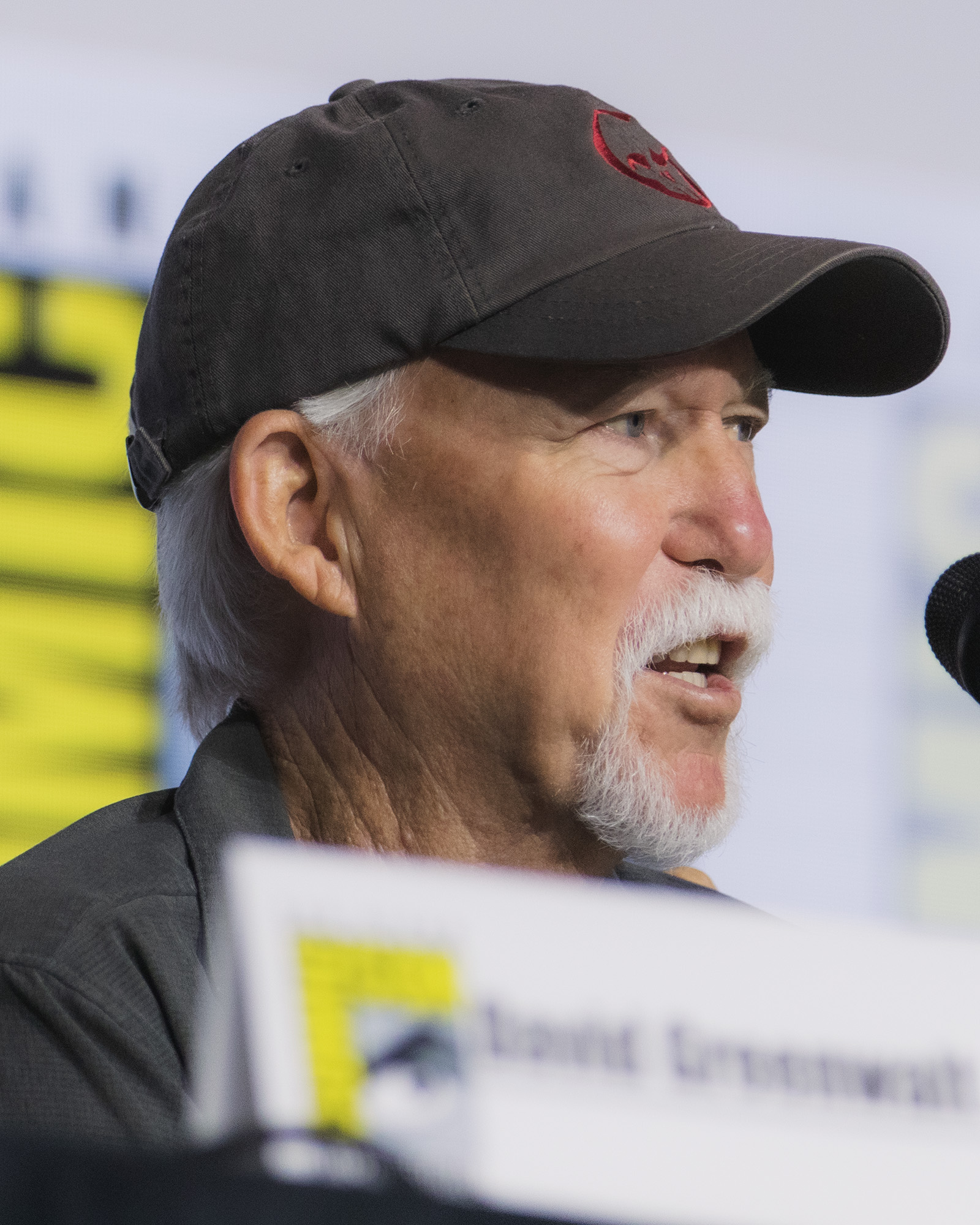
- Kouf in 2026
- Born: July 24, 1951 (age 75); Hollywood, California, U.S.
- Other names: Bob Hunt; James Kouf Jr. M. James Kouf Jr.
- Education: California Polytechnic State University (BA)
- Occupations: Screenwriter, producer, film director

Jim Kouf (born July 24, 1951) is an American screenwriter, film director and producer. His screenwriting credits include Stakeout (1987), The Hidden (1987), Rush Hour (1998), National Treasure (2004) and Money Monster (2016). He also co-created and executive produced the NBC supernatural drama series Grimm (2011–2017). Kouf received the 1988 Edgar Award for Best Motion Picture for his screenplay for Stakeout.

== Early life and education ==
Kouf was born in Hollywood, California, on July 24, 1951. He attended California Polytechnic State University in San Luis Obispo, where he earned a Bachelor of Arts degree in English in 1974. During his studies, he developed an interest in dramatic writing, including through a playwriting course. He later participated in the university's English Department Career Connections Program, mentoring students interested in careers in the entertainment industry.

== Career ==
=== Early career and breakthrough ===
Kouf began working in the film industry in the early 1980s. His early screenwriting credits included The Boogens (1981), for which he used the pseudonym Bob Hunt, Wacko (1982), Pink Motel (1982), Utilities (1983) and Class (1983). During this period, he also wrote the screenplays for Up the Creek (1984), American Dreamer (1984), Secret Admirer (1985) and Shaker Run (1985). His collaboration with fellow screenwriter and producer David Greenwalt dates back to their work on Wacko.

Kouf made his feature-film directorial debut with Miracles (1986), which he also wrote. His breakthrough as a screenwriter came with the action comedy Stakeout (1987), directed by John Badham and starring Richard Dreyfuss and Emilio Estevez. Kouf also received a producer credit on the film. His screenplay earned the 1988 Edgar Award for Best Motion Picture, presented by the Mystery Writers of America.

In the same year as Stakeout, Kouf wrote the screenplay for the science-fiction thriller The Hidden (1987), again using the name Bob Hunt. He subsequently wrote and directed the crime comedy Disorganized Crime (1989). He returned to the characters from Stakeout as the screenwriter of its sequel, Another Stakeout (1993).

=== Film work in the 1990s and 2000s ===
During the 1990s, Kouf continued working in comedy, action and crime films. He wrote Operation Dumbo Drop (1995) and wrote, directed and produced the crime thriller Gang Related (1997), starring Jim Belushi and Tupac Shakur. He also served as an executive producer of the action film Con Air (1997), directed by Simon West and starring Nicolas Cage.

Kouf was a screenwriter of the action comedy Rush Hour (1998), starring Jackie Chan and Chris Tucker. His subsequent film credits included the family comedy Snow Dogs (2002), the action comedy Taxi (2004) and the adventure film National Treasure (2004), starring Nicolas Cage. His screenwriting work during this period included collaborations on films that combined action, comedy and adventure elements.

Kouf subsequently wrote and directed the independent crime comedy A Fork in the Road (2009). His later screenwriting credits included Money for Nothing (2012) and the thriller Money Monster (2016). The latter was directed by Jodie Foster and starred George Clooney and Julia Roberts. Kouf shared screenplay credit with Alan Di Fiore and Jamie Linden. The film was presented out of competition at the 2016 Cannes Film Festival.

=== Television career ===
Alongside his film work, Kouf developed a career in television. His early television credits included White Water Rebels (1983), for which he also served as a co-producer, and Last of the Great Survivors (1984). He subsequently worked on the supernatural drama Angel (2000–2001), the crime drama The Handler (2003) and the supernatural series Ghost Whisperer (2006–2007). His work on Angel and Ghost Whisperer contributed to his experience with television stories combining supernatural elements and contemporary settings.

Kouf's most extensive television project was Grimm, a supernatural police procedural that aired on NBC from 2011 to 2017. He co-created the series with David Greenwalt and Stephen Carpenter and worked as a writer, executive producer and showrunner. The series follows Nick Burkhardt, a Portland homicide detective who discovers that he is descended from a line of guardians responsible for protecting humanity from supernatural beings known as Wesen. Its premise combines police investigations with mythology and stories associated with the Brothers Grimm.

The creators chose Portland, Oregon, as the series' setting partly because its forests, rivers and frequently overcast atmosphere provided a visual environment suited to the show's supernatural themes. Kouf and Greenwalt drew on European folklore while gradually expanding the fictional mythology with new creatures and storylines. In interviews during the series' run, they discussed the challenges of developing the mythology and sustaining character relationships across successive seasons.

Grimm concluded in March 2017 after six seasons and 123 episodes. In an interview published shortly after the finale, Kouf and Greenwalt discussed their efforts to resolve the series' remaining mysteries and bring its overarching story to a conclusion. They also reflected on the fictional world they had developed over the course of the production.

=== Later work ===
Following the conclusion of Grimm, Kouf remained involved in film production. He was credited as a producer of the independent horror film Thine Ears Shall Bleed (2024), directed and written by Ben Bigelow and co-written by William Bigelow. The film, set in the American West during the 1860s, follows a minister and his family as they encounter a mysterious sound that they initially interpret as a divine presence. Kouf shared producer credits with Lynn Kouf and Dennis Aig. The film was released on digital platforms in July 2024.

== Filmography ==
=== Film ===
Year	Title	Director	Writer	Producer	Notes
1981	The Boogens	No	Yes	No	Credited as "Bob Hunt"
1982	Wacko	No	Yes	No	
1982	Pink Motel	No	Yes	No	
1983	Utilities	No	Yes	No	
1983	Class	No	Yes	No	
1984	Up the Creek	No	Yes	No	
1984	American Dreamer	No	Yes	No	
1985	Secret Admirer	No	Yes	No	
1986	Shaker Run	No	Yes	No	
1986	Miracles	Yes	Yes	No	
1987	Stakeout	No	Yes	Yes	Edgar Award for Best Motion Picture screenplay
1987	The Hidden	No	Yes	No	Credited as "Bob Hunt"
1989	Disorganized Crime	Yes	Yes	No	
1993	Another Stakeout	No	Yes	No	
1995	Operation Dumbo Drop	No	Yes	No	
1997	Gang Related	Yes	Yes	Yes	
1997	Con Air	No	No	Yes	Executive producer
1998	Rush Hour	No	Yes	No	
2002	Snow Dogs	No	Yes	No	
2004	Taxi	No	Yes	No	
2004	National Treasure	No	Yes	No	
2009	A Fork in the Road	Yes	Yes	No	
2012	Money for Nothing	No	Yes	No	
2016	Money Monster	No	Yes	No	Co-written with Alan Di Fiore and Jamie Linden
2024	Thine Ears Shall Bleed	No	No	Yes	Horror film directed by Ben Bigelow

=== Television ===
Year	Title	Notes
1983	White Water Rebels	Also co-producer
1984	Last of the Great Survivors	
2000–2001	Angel	Writer and producer
2003	The Handler	Writer and producer
2006–2007	Ghost Whisperer	Writer and executive producer
2011–2017	Grimm	Co-creator, writer, executive producer and showrunner

== Awards and recognition ==
Kouf received the 1988 Edgar Award for Best Motion Picture for his screenplay for Stakeout. The award was presented by the Mystery Writers of America.
