= Stakeout (1987 film) =

1987 buddy cop action comedy film written by Jim Kouf and directed by John Badham

- Theatrical release poster by Steven Chorney
- Directed by: John Badham
- Written by: Jim Kouf
- Produced by: Jim Kouf; Cathleen Summers
- Starring: Richard Dreyfuss; Emilio Estevez
- Cinematography: John Seale
- Edited by: Michael Ripps; Tom Rolf
- Music by: Arthur B. Rubinstein
- Production companies: Touchstone Pictures; Silver Screen Partners II
- Distributed by: Buena Vista Pictures Distribution
- Release date: August 5, 1987
- Running time: 117 minutes
- Country: United States
- Language: English
- Budget: $14.5 million
- Box office: $65.7 million

Stakeout is a 1987 American buddy cop action comedy film directed by John Badham and starring Richard Dreyfuss, Emilio Estevez, Madeleine Stowe and Aidan Quinn. The screenplay was written by Jim Kouf, who won a 1988 Edgar Award for his work. Although the story is set in Seattle, the film was shot in Vancouver. A sequel, Another Stakeout, followed in 1993.

The film later inspired the 1989 Malayalam-language film Vandanam and 1991 Telugu-language film Nirnayam.

== Plot ==
Detectives Chris Lecce and Bill Reimers are assigned to the night shift on a stakeout of Latina waitress Maria McGuire. Her former boyfriend, Richard "Stick" Montgomery, has escaped from Stonehurst Prison following a staged brawl with his cellmate with help from his cousin Caylor Reese; both escaped in a truck.

The FBI asks for cooperation from Lecce and Reimers in capturing Montgomery. They believe he may return to an old girlfriend, Maria McGuire, who lives in Seattle. Meanwhile, Lecce is going through a divorce. He comes home and finds out that his wife moved out, took the furniture, leaving him in despair.

Montgomery telephones Maria but the line gets cut off so the call cannot be traced. He has a large amount of money he secretly hid in an armchair prior to his incarceration. Lecce and Reimers spy on Maria, hoping Montgomery will turn up at her door so they can arrest him. Lecce pretends to be a telephone lineman, to get close to Maria. He also helps her brother Ray to get a job to stay out of trouble.

Fate takes a turn as Lecce falls in love with Maria and the Seattle Police suspect him as being one of Montgomery's allies. While Lecce is asleep in Maria's bed, Montgomery and Reese break into her house, with Montgomery shooting Lecce in the face. Lecce wakes up, however, to find out it was only a nightmare. Realizing he slept in, he must leave the house without being seen. At the police station, Reimers scolds him for sleeping with Maria, and reminds him he is a good cop who made one mistake.

After killing a cashier in a gas station, Montgomery and Reese have a run-in with several officers waiting for them outside Seattle, causing a shootout and their car crashes into the river. Montgomery escapes from the vehicle before it sinks, but Reese is wounded and dies in the sunken car.

Lecce reveals his profession to Maria, and she starts to get upset, only to run into Montgomery, who tells Lecce and Maria that he stashed half-million dollars in a couch that he bought for her years prior. He was hoping that he and Maria would have a great life together in Canada, but Lecce ruined it.

After capturing Reimers, Montgomery plans to murder both cops. He is joined by his associate BC, who arrives on a boat. Leece and Reimers manage to free themselves and Leece goes after Montgomery while Reimers pursues BC, who has fled on his boat. Reimers manages to sneak onto the boat wherein he and BC get into a fight, causing the boat to crash which sends BC flying into the water where he drowns. The climax of the film takes place at a paper mill where Lecce and Montgomery have a shootout, resulting in Montgomery being shot in the chest. Maria and Lecce start a relationship.

== Cast ==
- Richard Dreyfuss as Detective Christopher "Chris" Lecce
- Emilio Estevez as Detective William "Bill" Reimers
- Aidan Quinn as Richard "Stick" Montgomery
- Madeleine Stowe as Maria McGuire
- Forest Whitaker as Detective Jack Pismo
- Dan Lauria as Detective Phillip "Phil" Coldshank
- Earl Billings as Captain Al Giles
- Ian Tracey as Caylor Reese
- Jackson Davies as FBI Agent Thomas Lusk
- J. J. Makaro as B.C.
- Scott Andersen as Reynaldo McGuire
- Tony Pantages as Tony Harmon
- Beatrice Boepple as Carol Reimers
- Kyle Wodia as Jeffrey Reimers
- Jan Speck as Kelly McDonald
- Kim Kondrashoff as Billy Steeks
- Gary Heatherington as Prison Doctor
- Don S. Davis as Prison Gate Guard
- Blu Mankuma as 2nd Paramedic
- Denny Williams as Farol Bernie

== Production ==
Principal photography started between January 16 and February 2, 1987, in Vancouver, Canada.

== Reception ==
=== Box office ===
The film debuted at number one at the box office. It went on to gross $65.6 million domestically, ranking as the eighth-highest-grossing film of the year.

=== Critical response ===
On Rotten Tomatoes the film holds an approval rating of 89% based on 27 reviews, with an average rating of 6.9/10. The website's critics consensus reads, "Richard Dreyfuss and Emilio Estevez make for great company during this Stakeout, a bawdy procedural that mines great pleasure from the odd couple's comedic chemistry." On Metacritic, the film has a weighted average score of 69 out of 100, based on 14 critics, indicating "generally favorable reviews". Audiences polled by CinemaScore gave the film an average grade of "A−" on an A+ to F scale.

Film critic Roger Ebert gave the film three stars, praising its premise while finding that the humor and the human aspect were surrounded by violent thriller aspects that did not gel as well with the humor, although he highlighted Dreyfuss and his performance.

== Sequel ==
After the commercial success, six years later it was followed by a sequel, Another Stakeout in 1993 with Richard Dreyfuss and Emilio Estevez reprising their roles. The film was not as successful as the first, and further films were not planned.
