= Bird on a Wire (film) =

1990 film by John Badham

- Theatrical release poster
- Directed by: John Badham
- Written by: Louis Venosta; David Seltzer
- Produced by: Rob Cohen
- Starring: Mel Gibson; Goldie Hawn; David Carradine; Bill Duke
- Cinematography: Robert Primes
- Edited by: Frank Morriss; Dallas Puett
- Music by: Hans Zimmer
- Production companies: Interscope Communications; The Badham/Cohen Group
- Distributed by: Universal Pictures
- Release date: May 18, 1990
- Running time: 110 minutes
- Country: United States
- Language: English
- Budget: $20 million
- Box office: $138.7 million

Bird on a Wire is a 1990 American action comedy film directed by John Badham and starring Mel Gibson and Goldie Hawn. Gibson portrays Rick Jarmin, a man in the witness protection program who is unexpectedly reunited with his former girlfriend Marianne Graves, played by Hawn, and both find themselves on the run. Critical reception was mixed, but the film was a box office hit.

== Plot ==
While in Detroit on business, attorney Marianne Graves stops for gas and is served by attendant Billy Ray Bowers. She immediately recognizes him as her former fiancé, Rick Jarmin, whom she believes died in a plane crash 15 years earlier. Billy Ray denies it, but after she leaves, he contacts the Witness Protection Program to request relocation, revealing that he is Rick. His handler, Lou Baird, has retired, and agent Joe Weyburn intercepts the call while posing as his replacement. Weyburn is working with criminal former DEA agents Eugene Sorenson and Albert "Diggs" Diggins, who want Rick dead because his testimony imprisoned Sorenson and could still implicate Diggs. Rick gives Weyburn his current identity and location, after which Weyburn deletes Rick's record.

That night, Marianne returns to confirm Rick's identity just as Sorenson and Diggs arrive to kill him, and although Rick escapes with Marianne, Sorenson and Diggs murder Rick's employer to frame him. Marianne takes Rick to her hotel room, where she berates him for allowing her to believe he was dead. The next morning, Sorenson and Diggs break in, forcing them to flee. Police, believing Marianne has been kidnapped, confront them in the street, but Rick fights them off and escapes with her. He decides to find Lou in Wisconsin, believing he can help.

On a ferry to Racine, Wisconsin, Rick reveals to Marianne that their mutual friend Jamie was murdered. Sorenson and Diggs had arrested Rick and Jamie for drug possession and coerced them into using their piloting skills to fly drug shipments across the border. When police surrounded them after one flight, Diggs escaped while Rick and Jamie tried to stop Sorenson from shooting anyone. Sorenson shot Jamie in the struggle, and Rick was placed in witness protection by the FBI in exchange for testimony against Sorenson.

In Racine, Rick visits a former employer under one of his past identities to get an address book that leads to Lou. His former manager demands repayment of an old debt first, but when Marianne goes to the bank, her account has been flagged, causing staff to call the police. They escape, though Marianne initially refuses to continue the dangerous journey. When police surround her, Rick returns, and she rejoins him.

Weyburn realizes Rick is retracing his former identities to get help and predicts he will next visit Jasmin Hills Animal Hospital. There, Rick encounters former lover Rachel Varney, who treats his wounds. She then helps Rick and Marianne repel an attack by helicopter-borne hitmen. The pair escape in a small plane, damaging the pursuing helicopter's blades before crash-landing themselves.

At a rundown hotel, Rick and Marianne discuss their past regrets and have sex. The next morning, Rick trades Marianne's watch for a car, while she secretly calls her boyfriend Paul, asking him to contact the authorities because she fears Rick is walking into a trap.

At Lou's home, Rick learns that dementia has left him unable to remember Rick. Weyburn, Diggs, and Sorenson arrive, and Rick and Marianne flee to a nearby zoo where Rick once worked. Rick uses the grounds to his advantage, but is ultimately shot. He releases the animals as a distraction, lures Diggs into an enclosure, where he is killed by a tiger, and Weyburn is killed after falling into a piranha pool. Sorenson takes Marianne hostage, prompting Rick to fight him on a rickety bridge above the tiger enclosure. When the bridge collapses against an electrified fence, Rick deliberately shocks himself and Sorenson, causing Sorenson to fall and be electrocuted while Marianne pulls Rick to safety.

Some time later, Rick and Marianne are married and vacation aboard a yacht.

== Cast ==
- Mel Gibson as Richard "Rick" Jarmin
- Goldie Hawn as Marianne Graves
- David Carradine as Eugene Sorenson
- Bill Duke as Albert "Diggs" Diggins
- Stephen Tobolowsky as Joe Weyburn
- Joan Severance as Rachel Varney
- Jeff Corey as Lou Baird
- John Pyper-Ferguson as Jamie
- Clyde Kusatsu as Mr. Takawaki
- Kevin McNulty as Brad
- Christopher Judge as Café Cop

== Music ==
The original score was composed by Hans Zimmer.

In a conversation about his score for Bird on a Wire, Zimmer explained why the soundtrack was never released: “It was too expensive to release.” The reason was the hefty reuse fees associated with recording in the U.S. with a large orchestra. He explained, “If it’s a 103-piece orchestra, you’re talking serious dollars," especially in the U.S. where union fees are high. Zimmer contrasted this with his work on other films like Green Card or Regarding Henry, which were recorded with synthesizers and didn't incur the same expensive fees, making them easier to release.

== Production ==
Bird on a Wire was filmed mainly in British Columbia, Canada. The alley motorcycle chase scene was filmed in Victoria's Chinatown, in Fan Tan Alley.

The title refers to the Leonard Cohen song "Bird on the Wire", which is sung by Aaron Neville for the film.

== Reception ==
A review in Variety called it "an overproduced, tedious road movie" and wrote that "Frank Capra's It Happened One Night established the format, but John Badham is stuck with a terrible script on this 1990s version. Only the chemistry of Goldie Hawn and Mel Gibson makes the film watchable." Desson Howe of The Washington Post wrote his review of the film in the style of an autopsy, opening it by saying "The Names: Mel Gibson and Goldie Hawn. The Movie: Bird on a Wire. The Reason: Information currently unavailable." Owen Gleiberman gave the film a D grade in Entertainment Weekly, where he wrote that "even in an era of paint-by-numbers moviemaking, director John Badham (Saturday Night Fever, Stakeout) has pulled off a feat: He has made a film that's 100 percent generic. It should have been called ROMANTIC ACTION COMEDY." Roger Ebert gave the film a two-and-a-half-star rating out of four, writing:

My guess is they screened a lot of Hitchcock movies before they made Bird on a Wire, and the parts they liked the best were where Hitch placed his couples in situations that were dangerous and picturesque at the same time; scenes like the Mt. Rushmore climax in North by Northwest. That was a delicate balancing act when Hitchcock did it; the locations, sensational as they were, couldn't be allowed to upstage the thrills. In Bird on a Wire, the act loses its balance.

Gene Siskel, his colleague, reacted more harshly toward the film, calling it "a comic love story packed with more mindless action than any meaningful contact between the principals", and adding:

The project is so wrong-headed that one despairs for Gibson's once-serious film career. Hawn has been a lost soul for years, still trading on her cutesy laugh, which is no longer funny.

Janet Maslin of The New York Times wrote that "Bird on a Wire fits a simple equation: you will like it in exact proportion to how willing you are to be charmed by Mel Gibson or Goldie Hawn. And that is definitely an either/or proposition. For while each of them is seriously cute here, together they generate less heat than Robert De Niro and Charles Grodin did in Midnight Run, the on-the-lam movie that this one most resembles." Kathleen Carroll of the New York Daily News wrote that "Gibson and Hawn are not the perfect screen love match. They look cute together. But they generate a minimal amount of electricity in what is little more than a fly-by-night action movie." Peter Rainer of the Los Angeles Times called it "both frenetic and witless--a bad combination. It's the sort of action-comedy vehicle that stands a chance of succeeding only if the star chemistry is strong enough to compensate for all the uninspired callisthenic derring-do. Mel Gibson and Goldie Hawn can't cultivate their chemistry because their characters are too busy dodging bullets and scampering away from the bad guys. They're moving-target gagsters in a techno-pop shooting gallery." Carrie Richey of The Philadelphia Inquirer said that "Badham is more intrigued with the mechanics of his film's various vehicles than he is with the mechanics of its script. As a result, the machines purr and the plot clunks." Gary Thompson of the Philadelphia Daily News called the film "one of those awful studio concept pictures that seeks to blend the elements of two popular movies in hopes of creating one super-popular movie. The result, however, is another tiresome road picture with two megastars who fail to generate anything resembling screen chemistry. Sparks eventually fly, but only when a guy gets electrocuted at the end. The movie's main distinguishing feature, or features, are the respective bums of Hawn and Gibson. The miracle of Bird on a Wire is that such established stars are so often willing to exploit themselves with the kind of cheesecake and beefcake shots normally reserved for Playboy videos." Michael H. Price of the Fort Worth Star-Telegram said that "clearly, there is nothing cheap or cheesy about Bird on a Wire, and yet the film feels significantly less than the sum of its parts. Goldie Hawn is much of the problem—her overfamiliar tough-kittenish approach feels more forced with every movie—and so are recycled story elements.

Henry Mietkiewicz in the Toronto Star wrote:

Walk into certain supermarkets and you'll find a slew of bland, no-frills products in austere packages at bargain prices.

As yet, no one has considered promoting movies that way, nor are they likely to.

But if ever a film deserved to be hawked via a poster with the word "Movie" in big, block letters on a stark, white background, it's Bird on a Wire.

Along the bottom, you'd also find the following notice, in smaller bold-face type: "Action-romance. Contains two stars, gunfire, explosions, three chases, one doublecross, 1960s nostalgia, romantic banter, one bedroom scene and one climactic showdown."

Who would have imagined that Goldie Hawn, without a hit for 10 long years since Private Benjamin, would choose director John Badham's noisy, vacuous vehicle for her comeback attempt?

Teaming with Mel Gibson was a sensible move for commercial reasons. Even the difference in their ages - she's 44, he's 34 - doesn't noticeably upset the romantic chemistry.

But after working so hard in the late '70s and early '80s to create the impression that her giggly exterior hid a shrewd mind, Hawn has now accepted a role as little more than a dizzy damsel in distress.

Of 47 reviews that Variety considered in New York, Los Angeles, Chicago and Washington D.C., only one was favorable and 38 were unfavorable. On the review aggregator website Rotten Tomatoes, 26% of 27 critics' reviews are positive, with an average rating of 4.2/10. Audiences polled by CinemaScore gave the film an average grade of "B+" on an A+ to F scale.

=== Box office ===
Bird on a Wire debuted at number 1 at the US box office with an opening weekend gross of $15.3 million and went on to gross over $138.6 million worldwide against a $20 million budget. It is considered a box office success.
