= Disorganized Crime =

1989 film by Jim Kouf

- Theatrical release poster
- Directed by: Jim Kouf
- Written by: Jim Kouf
- Produced by: Lynn Bigelow
- Starring: Hoyt Axton; Corbin Bernsen; Rubén Blades; Fred Gwynne; Ed O'Neill; Lou Diamond Phillips; Daniel Roebuck; William Russ
- Cinematography: Ronald Víctor García
- Edited by: Frank Morriss; Dallas Puet
- Music by: David Newman
- Production companies: Touchstone Pictures; Silver Screen Partners IV; Kouf/Bigelow Productions
- Distributed by: Buena Vista Pictures Distribution
- Release date: April 14, 1989
- Running time: 101 minutes
- Country: United States
- Language: English
- Budget: Est. $5,300,000
- Box office: Domestic: $7,724,000

Disorganized Crime is a 1989 American heist comedy film. It was written and directed by Jim Kouf and released through Touchstone Pictures. The ensemble cast includes Fred Gwynne, Lou Diamond Phillips, Rubén Blades, William Russ, Corbin Bernsen, Ed O'Neill, Daniel Roebuck and Hoyt Axton.

== Plot ==
The story begins in a small town in western Montana where New Jersey–based bank robber Frank Salazar has been hiding out from the law after a series of bank robberies in Newark. Upon realizing that the local bank contains a large amount of cash, Salazar recruits four former accomplices to come to town and help him rob the bank. Among them are Nick Bartkowski, a nervous and possibly alcoholic safecracker; Max Green, an old school explosives expert with a heart condition; Ray Forgy, a young, wisecracking auto thief and getaway driver; and Carlos Barrios, a well-manicured lookout and weapons expert.

Before they can arrive, however, two New Jersey detectives (George Denver and Bill Lonigan) catch up with Salazar, arrest him, and extradite him back to New Jersey. Salazar soon escapes and becomes hopelessly lost in the Montana wilderness as he flees Denver and Lonigan's custody.

Unaware of Salazar's arrest and escape, the four accomplices arrive and realize that he is nowhere to be found. They finally decide to take down the bank on their own but must go through several humorous ordeals before they can complete their plan. The four successfully rob the bank and escape. Salazar is caught shortly thereafter and accused of the robbery, despite having not taken part. Learning that his police bail has been set at $1 million, three of the four (against Bartkowski's wishes) decide to use their loot to rescue Salazar.

== Cast ==
- Fred Gwynne as Max Green
- Lou Diamond Phillips as Ray Forgy
- Rubén Blades as Carlos Barrios
- William Russ as Nick Bartkowski
- Corbin Bernsen as Frank Salazar
- Ed O'Neill as Detective George Denver
- Daniel Roebuck as Detective Bill Lonigan
- Hoyt Axton as Sheriff Henault

== Production ==
Principal photography begin on April 22, 1988, in Missoula, Montana. During the first week of filming in Missoula, a group of Teamsters Union began picketing the set, and protest the production company's use of non-union drivers. Bitterroot Productions had hired 14 non-union drivers, most of them local residents, to move people and equipment between the sets. They first offered the jobs to Teamsters officials, but the union rejected the offer.

After filming was complete in Missoula, the cast and crew traveled to nearby Hamilton, Montana, where most of the film is set. They spent nearly a month and a half filming there because of the bank scenes, the court house scene at the Ravalli Country Court House, and other locations in town. Finally they convened in Darby, Montanam where they filmed the small house scenes where the four bank robbers hide out for their partner Salazar, the gas station scene and the river sequence where the two cops try to track down Salazar.

Filming was completed shortly in late June 1988. Hoyt Axton, who plays the sheriff, loved the Bitterroot Valley so much he purchased a ranch in the valley shortly after filming was completed. He lived there for most of the time until his death.

== Release ==
Disorganized Crime had its world premiere at The Roxy Theatre in Hamilton on April 8, 1989. Stars Corbin Bernsen, Lou Diamond Phillips, William Russ & Daniel Roebuck attended the premiere, including producer Lynn Bigelow and writer and director Jim Kouf. The premiere was a great turnout for residents of Hamilton, who attended & enjoyed seeing the actors coming back to their beloved town for the premiere. The film was released in theatres worldwide on April 14, 1989.

=== Home media ===
Disorganized Crime was originally released on VHS followed by a 1996 re-release and a LaserDisc format. It arrived on a single-disc DVD set on September 3, 2002. It was re-released on DVD and Blu-ray on May 10, 2011, by Mill Creek Entertainment.

On June 26, 2018, Kino Lorber re-released the film on Blu-ray with new special features including an audio commentary with director Jim Kouf and producer Lynn Bigelow.

== Critical reception ==
Upon release, Disorganized Crime was met with mixed and overall poor reception by top critics. Both Siskel and Ebert gave it a thumbs down; reproach was aimed at the lack of detail given to the bank heist plan. They claimed that the film relies on "slapstick and cornball barnyard humor," and cited its frequency of chase scenes and moments where characters fall in mud and manure. However, Ebert did credit the actions of Lou Diamond Phillips's character as a highlight.

Caryn James of The New York Times gave similar feedback, and claimed that Rubén Blades gives "the only genuinely comic performance." Rita Kempley of The Washington Post called it "a human rehash of the city-mouse/country-mouse story" but also praised Blades for his "comic zest."

=== Reaction from cast ===
In a 2003 interview with DVD Empire, Lou Diamond Phillips said:

"As a film, I felt it was a bit disappointing, and I think it should have been funnier. Unfortunately, I think the script was funnier than the actual film came out to be, but I think we were all on a different page. I think the director wanted to make more of an action film or a heist film than he wanted to make a comedy, and Jim Kouf – he was also the writer – I think that he shied away from the comedy of it, which is unfortunate because if we had gone that way I think the film would have been more satisfying."
