= John Badham =

American film and television director (born 1939)

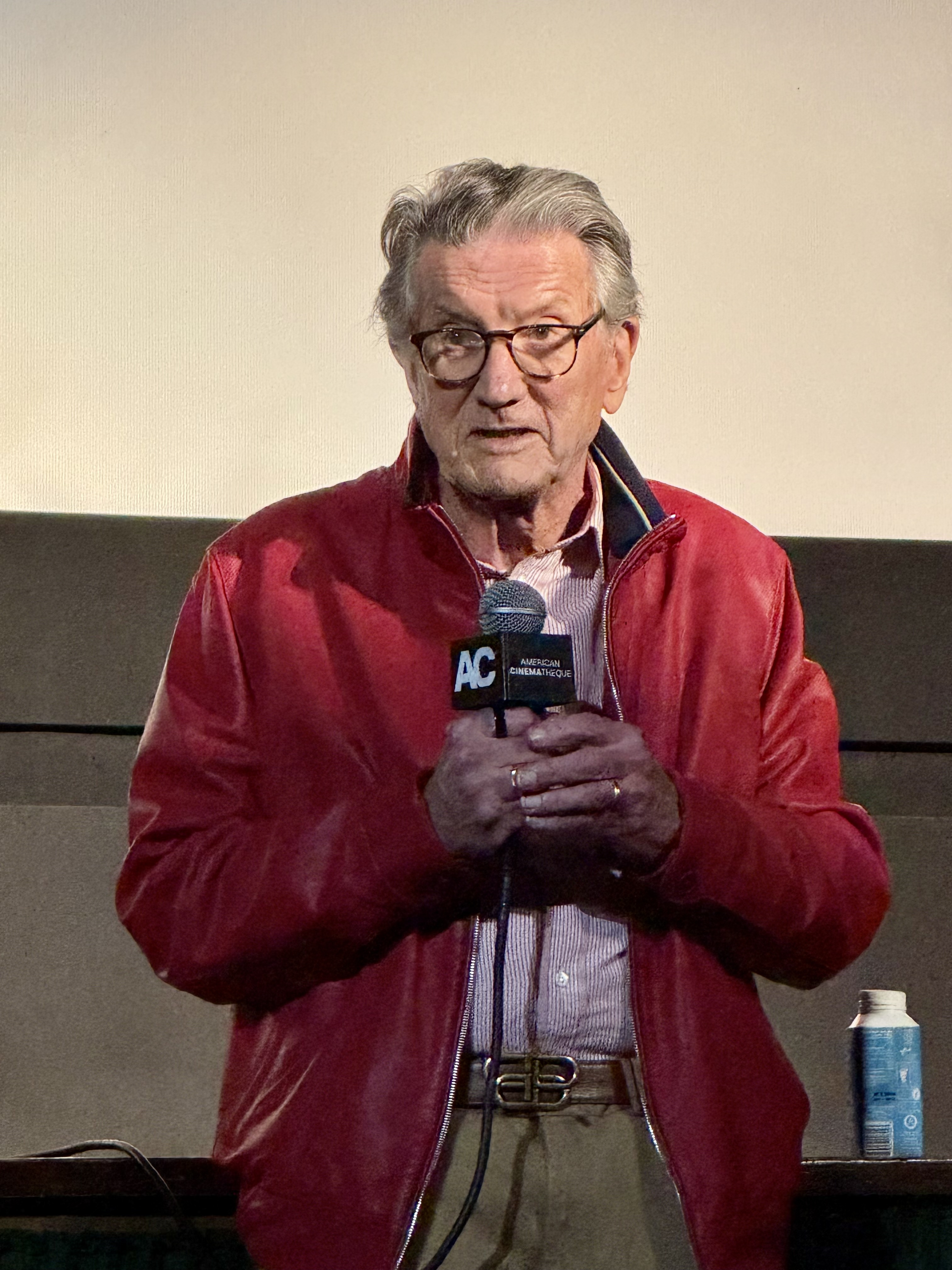
- Badham in 2025
- Born: August 29, 1939 (age 87); Luton, Bedfordshire, England
- Citizenship: United States (from 1950)
- Education: Yale University
- Occupation: Filmmaker
- Years active: 1971–present
- Relatives: Mary Badham (sister)
- Website: johnbadham.com

John Badham (born August 29, 1939) is an American filmmaker, best known for directing the films Saturday Night Fever (1977), Dracula (1979), Blue Thunder (1983), WarGames (1983), Short Circuit (1986), Stakeout (1987), Bird on a Wire (1990), The Hard Way (1991), Point of No Return (1993), Drop Zone (1994), and Nick of Time (1995). He is a two-time Primetime Emmy Award nominee, a two-time Hugo Award nominee, and a Saturn Award winner. He is also a Professor at Chapman University.

== Early life ==
Badham was born in Luton, Bedfordshire, England, the son of actress Mary Hewitt. When he was five, Badham moved with his mother and stepfather—a U.S. Army brigadier general—to his stepfather's hometown of Birmingham, Alabama, and became a naturalized American citizen in 1950. He attended Yale University, earning a bachelor's degree in philosophy and then Master of Fine Arts in 1966. From 1964 to 1970, Badham served as a medic in the United States Air Force and the California National Guard.

== Career ==
Badham worked in television for years, on Universal Television series like Cannon and The Bold Ones. He then directed several acclaimed TV movies, including Isn't It Shocking? (1973) and The Law (1974). His first feature film was The Bingo Long Traveling All-Stars & Motor Kings in 1976.

His breakthrough came in 1977 when he replaced John G. Avildsen as the director of Saturday Night Fever, a massive worldwide hit starring John Travolta. His choices after that film were wildly eclectic, ranging from the action thriller Blue Thunder (1983) to the comedy-drama Whose Life Is It Anyway? (1981) to the comedy thriller Stakeout (1987) and its sequel Another Stakeout (1993). WarGames (1983), starring Matthew Broderick, is his other signature film, renowned for its take on popular Cold War fears of nuclear terror as well as being one of the first films to deal with the subculture of amateur hacking. Another sizable hit was Short Circuit (1986), a comedy about a robot who comes to life.

In addition to his numerous film credits, Badham has also continued to direct and produce for TV, including credits for Rod Serling's Night Gallery, the A&E television series The Beast, TV movies like HBO's The Jack Bull (1999), and episodes of series including Crossing Jordan and Criminal Minds. He has also contributed commentary to the web series Trailers from Hell.

In 1986, he signed a two-year development deal with production company Universal Pictures, in order to develop various film projects. Badham is a Professor at Chapman University.

=== Unrealized projects ===
Badham has been considered to direct films that ended up being directed by others, such as The Wiz (1978), Brubaker (1980), First Blood (1982), Staying Alive (1983), The Dead Zone (1983), Starman (1984), Project X (1987), Short Circuit 2 (1988), Ghost Dad (1990), Patriot Games (1992), The Firm (1993) and Dragonheart (1996).

== Personal life ==
Badham's sister, Mary Badham, is an actress who was nominated for an Oscar for her role as "Scout" Finch in the film To Kill a Mockingbird.

== Filmography ==
=== Film ===
Year	Title	Director	Producer	Writer	Notes
1976	The Bingo Long Traveling All-Stars & Motor Kings	Yes	No	No	Directorial debut
1977	Saturday Night Fever	Yes	No	No	
1979	Dracula	Yes	No	No	
1981	Whose Life Is It Anyway?	Yes	No	Uncredited	
1983	Blue Thunder	Yes	No	No	
1983	WarGames	Yes	No	No	Replaced Martin Brest
1985	American Flyers	Yes	No	No	
1986	Short Circuit	Yes	No	No	
1987	Stakeout	Yes	Executive	No	
1989	Disorganized Crime	No	Executive	No	
1990	Bird on a Wire	Yes	No	No	
1991	The Hard Way	Yes	No	No	
1993	Point of No Return	Yes	No	No	
1993	Dragon: The Bruce Lee Story	No	Executive	No	
1993	Another Stakeout	Yes	Executive	No	
1994	Drop Zone	Yes	Executive	No	
1995	Nick of Time	Yes	Yes	No	
1997	Incognito	Yes	No	No	

=== Television films ===
- The Impatient Heart, NBC (1971)
- No Place to Run, ABC (1972) (uncredited)
- Isn't It Shocking?, ABC (1973)
- The Law, NBC (1974)
- The Gun, ABC (1974)
- Reflections of Murder, ABC (1974)
- The Godchild, ABC (1974)
- The Keegans, CBS (1976)
- Floating Away, Showtime (1998)
- The Jack Bull, HBO (1999)
- The Last Debate, Showtime (2000)
- Brother's Keeper, USA (2002)
- Obsessed, Lifetime (2002)
- Footsteps, CBS (2003)
- Evel Knievel, TNT (2004)

=== Television series ===
- The Bold Ones: The Senator, NBC (1971)
- Sarge, NBC (1971)
- Night Gallery, NBC (1971)
- Nichols, NBC (1972)
- The Sixth Sense, ABC (1972)
- The Bold Ones: The New Doctors, NBC (1972)
- Cool Million, NBC (1972)
- Kung Fu, ABC (1972)
- Owen Marshall, Counselor at Law, ABC (1973)
- The Streets of San Francisco, ABC (1973)
- Cannon, CBS (1973)
- Police Story, NBC (1973)
- Rex Harrison Presents Stories of Love, NBC (1974)
- The Shield, FX (2003)
- Blind Justice, ABC (2005)
- Just Legal, The WB (2005)
- Heroes, NBC (2006)
- Crossing Jordan, NBC (2007)
- Standoff, FOX (2007)
- Las Vegas, NBC (2007)
- Psych, USA (2007)
- Men in Trees, ABC (2008)
- In Plain Sight, USA (2008)
- The Beast, A&E (2009)
- Criminal Minds, CBS (2009)
- Trauma, NBC (2010)
- The Event, NBC (2010)
- Nikita, The CW (2012)
- Constantine, NBC (2014)
- Supernatural, The CW (2014)
- 12 Monkeys, SYFY (2015)
- Stitchers, FREE (2015)
- Arrow, The CW (2015)
- Rush Hour, CBS (2016)
- Siren, Freeform (2018)

== Bibliography ==
- Badham, John (2006). I'll Be in My Trailer. Michael Wiese Productions. ISBN 1932907149.
- Badham, John (2013). John Badham on Directing. Michael Wiese Productions. ISBN 9781615931385.
