= Guy Manos =

American film director

- Born: September 7, 1959 (age 66); Cleveland, Ohio, United States
- Known for: Film producer, Skydiver

Guy Manos (born September 7, 1959) is a former world champion skydiver and multiple world record holder, as well as a screenwriter, film director, and stuntman. He is a graduate of the University of Miami Film School.

== Skydiving career ==
Manos has over 10,000 skydives to his credit and was a member of the DeLand Air Bears who won the 4-way World Championship in 1985.

A number of skydiving records were set or organised by Manos, including the world's first 2-point 100 way.

Skydiving Magazine named Manos 'Skydiver of the Year' in 1992.

== Film career ==
Manos featured in a number of skydiving fraternity video features, as skydive photography became popular through the 1980s. He followed his involvement in the Norman Kent production From Wings Came Flight by directing and producing Flight of the Dream Team, a documentary.

Manos was a writer stunt double for Gary Busey for the 1994 Hollywood action skydiving film Drop Zone.

He co-wrote the screenplay for and directed the 2000 action-adventure film Cutaway, about a U.S. Customs agent getting involved in skydiving as part of a sting operation targeting parachuting drug smugglers.

He directed action units in Drop Zone, Shadow Ops, Eraser and Get Smart, and has performed stunts in dozens of Hollywood films, including Virus, Last Action Hero, Eraser, George of the Jungle, Cliffhanger, and Get Smart.
