= Zach Bonner =

American philanthropist (born 1997)

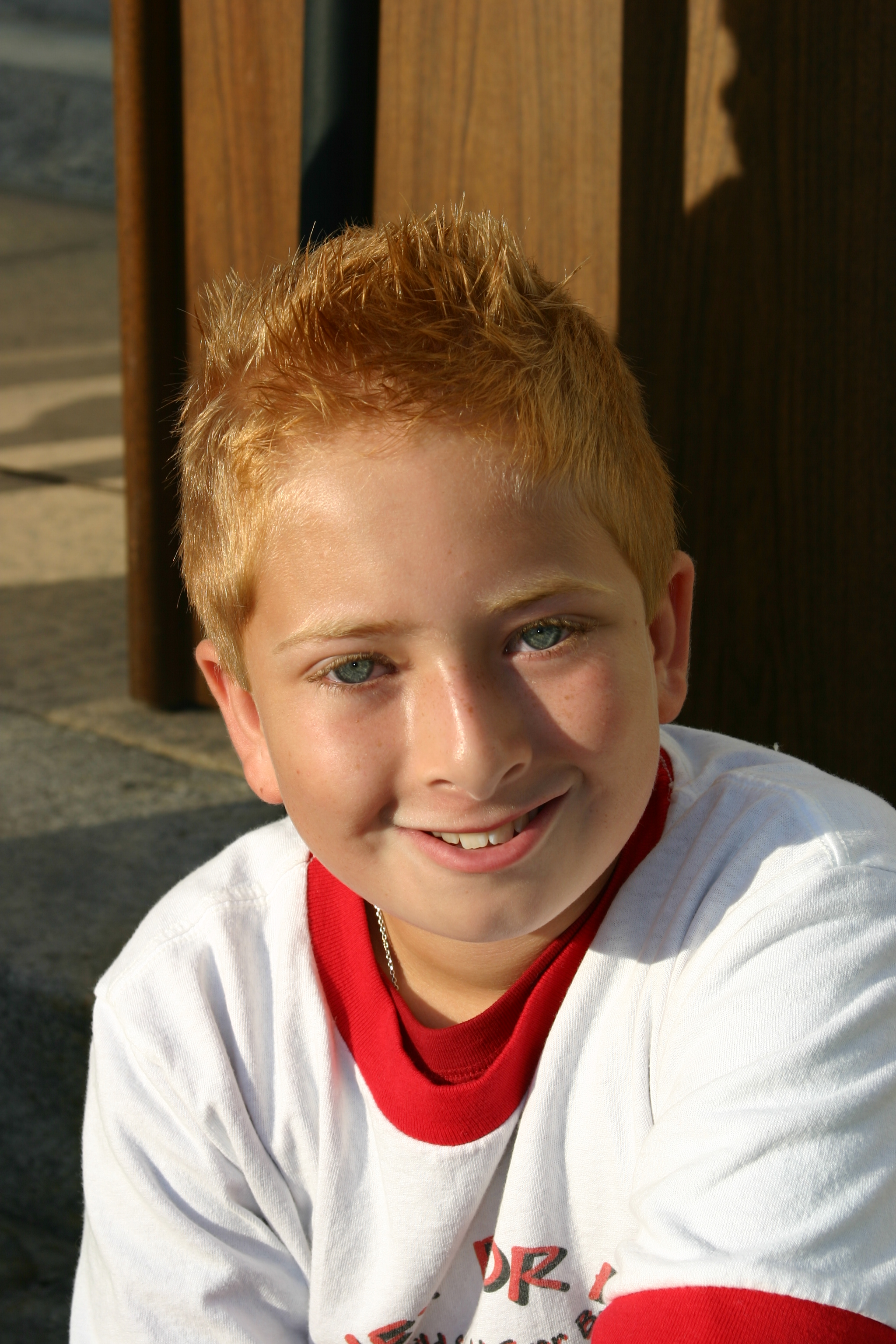
- Bonner in 2008
- Born: November 17, 1997 (age 28); Searcy, Arkansas
- Citizenship: American

Zachary L. Bonner (born November 17, 1997) is an American philanthropist and founder of the non-profit charity Little Red Wagon Foundation. Bonner received the Presidential Service Award in 2006.

When he was seven years old, he founded the organization to aid the 1.3 million homeless children in the United States. Bonner said that, "These kids don't have a home, they don't have a safe place to sleep at night. They're out on the streets not because they want to be, but because it's out of their control."

In 2007, Bonner began his three-stage "My House to the White House" project. The project's purpose was to raise money and awareness for homeless children. In 2007, he walked 280 miles from Tampa to Tallahassee, Florida, while in 2008, he covered 250 miles from Tallahassee to Atlanta, Georgia. In the final leg of the trip, he walked 668 miles from Georgia to Washington D.C. Upon the completion of the "My House to the White House" project, Bonner planned another project, March Across America. From March 23 to September 14, 2010, he walked 2,448 miles from Tampa to Los Angeles. Starring Chandler Canterbury as Bonner, Little Red Wagon, a docudrama about Bonner's philanthropic work, was filmed in 2010 and released in 2012.

== Philanthropy ==
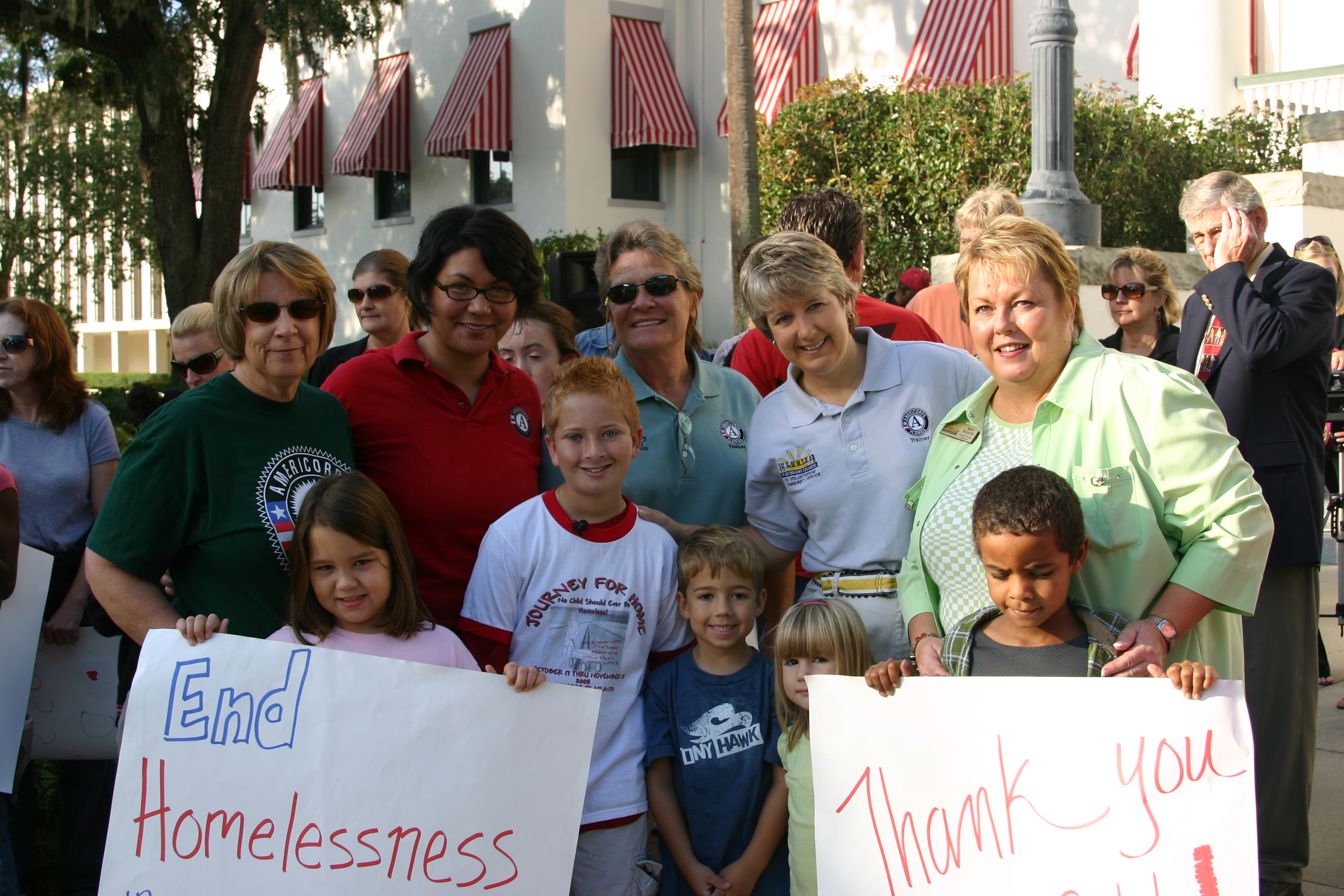
Bonner with friends and Volunteer Florida staff members

Bonner has done a variety of volunteer work since he was six years old. In 2004, when Hurricane Charley hit neighborhoods, he collected 27 pickup trucks of water in his little red wagon. He established the Little Red Wagon Foundation to "continue helping kids more efficiently". Bonner teamed up with the StandUp For Kids and collected 400 backpacks of supplies, nicknamed "Zachpacks", for homeless children. The Zachpacks were filled with donated snacks, toys, and toiletries. To date he has distributed over 10,000 of the Zachpacks.

Bonner organized Christmas parties for homeless children living in Baker, Louisiana, and he gave Christmas presents to Hurricane Katrina victims. To mitigate the adverse effects of homelessness, Bonner hosted parties for children who live in shelters at Build-A-Bear Workshop, Chuck E. Cheese's, and Six Flags.

In April 2007, he organized 24 Hours, an event that simulated being homeless for 24 hours. During that period of time, students in high school stayed in their own separate boxes for 24 hours. 24 Hours 2015 was the seventh year of the event in which youths 12 to 21 years old each paid $24 to live in cardboard boxes for an hour to simulate being homeless.

In January 2010, he launched a national campaign to end child homelessness. As keynote speaker at The Children's Philanthropy Center Annual Youth Symposium in Northern Virginia, he inspired young activists to use their voice to create change. The message, "You Matter! Let Your Voice Be Heard" became the signature anthem for their youth advocacy movement.

=== My House to the White House ===
Zach Bonner's "My House to the White House" project took place in three stages covering 1,225 miles to raise awareness and funds for homeless children. The first leg in 2007 from November 3–26 covered 280 miles from Tampa to Tallahassee, Florida and raised $25,000. The second leg in the fall of 2008 covered over 250 miles from Tallahassee to Atlanta, Georgia.

The third leg of the trip began May 11, 2009. The 668-mile, 59-day walk from Georgia to Washington D.C. was completed on July 10. On the final stretch of the walk, 500 people, among them 300 homeless children, walked with Bonner down the National Mall. Bonner met with Saxby Chambliss and spoke with several other U.S. Senators on Capitol Hill. He slept at the Sasha Bruce emergency shelter.

=== March Across America ===
There's an ancient Chinese proverb: 'A journey of a thousand miles begins with a single step.' Most people don't walk a thousand miles, or 2,500, but what it really means is that we all need to take that first step to get something big done. If I've helped even one homeless child, I hope I've accomplished that.

— Zach Bonner on September 14, 2010

In 2010, he walked from Tampa to Los Angeles. Calling the trip "March Across America", he began the 2,478-mile walk on March 23, 2010. Bonner walked an average of 17–22 miles every day. During his walk, he gave gift cards to people in need. Multiple television and radio stations tracked for their viewers Bonner's journey across America using the "Zach Tracker" GPS. Lee Cowan of NBC Nightly News' "Making A Difference" profiled Bonner in early August; Cowan called Bonner a "pint-sized philanthropist". On the show, Bonner said that "When you're having a bad day you (have) to realize that someone else is having a lot worse of a day than you."

Bonner planned to complete the walk by September, after 178 days of walking. On September 14, 2010, Bonner completed the nearly 2,500-mile-walk to Santa Monica, California. At the age of 12, he became the youngest person to walk from the East Coast of the United States to the West Coast of the United States.

=== Zach in a Box ===
Beginning March 26, 2013, Bonner lived seven days in a 512 cubic feet (14.5 m^{3}) plexiglas box in a field near Westfield Brandon mall. With plywood serving as the box's bottom, pieces of cardboard, and a sleeping bag, Bonner aimed to imitate a homeless person's lodgings.

Naming his fundraising effort "Zach in a Box", he encouraged people to donate non-perishable food. He wanted to coat all four walls of his box with donated canned food items. After seven days of donations from children and adults as well as a $1,000 donation from Sweetbay Supermarket, Bonner gave over 6,000 cans of food to Metropolitan Ministries and Francis House.

=== Food for a Million ===
From noon November 7, 2014, to noon November 8, 2014, at the Metropolitan Ministries' holiday tent in Tampa, Bonner hoped to set a Guinness World Record for amassing the most canned food items in 24 hours. He organized "World's Largest Food Drive: Food for a Million" with Metropolitan Ministries and Feeding America Tampa Bay, an attempt to collect one million pounds of food in 24 hours. Walmart, Winn-Dixie, Performance Food Group, and Publix promised to contribute food to the effort.

The previous world record holder was a North Carolina school that collected 559,885 pounds of food in 2011. Bonner's "Food for a Million" drive collected 566,600 pounds. The collected food was delivered to 10 counties: Hillsborough, Pinellas, Pasco, Polk, Hernando, Citrus, Sumter, Highlands, Hardee, and Manatee.

== Awards and recognition ==
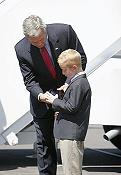
Bonner receives the President's Volunteer Service Award from President Bush

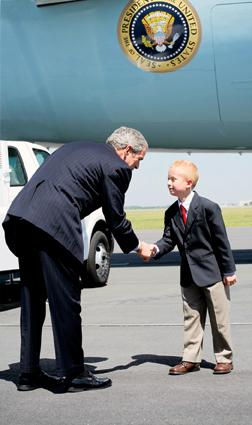
Bonner meets President Bush

In 2006, Zach received the Presidential Service Award from President George W. Bush. In the same year, he was honored with the Points of Light Award by Florida governor Jeb Bush for his volunteer service. Bonner has met George W. Bush and Bill Clinton. He has been featured on Good Morning America and in 2011 was named a hometown hero by Reader's Digest.

In 2007, Bonner was named one of 12 "Huggable Heroes" by the Build-A-Bear Workshop. On March 19, 2008, he received the Alexandra Scott Butterfly Award from the Volvo for life Awards, hosted by Volvo on 42nd Street. In 2009, the readers and editors of Beliefnet chose Bonner as the Most Inspiring Person of the Year. Receiving 22% of the vote, Bonner defeated the "hero pilot" Chesley Sullenberger and students in Iran who protested against a rigged election despite considerable jeopardy to their lives.

Elton John donated $25,000 to Bonner's cause after Bonner completed the 1,200-mile-walk from Tampa, Florida, to Washington, D.C.

== Philanthropy Project movie ==
Michael Guillen, the CEO of the non-profit organization Philanthropy Project, planned to make a $5 million movie about the Zach Bonner's walks and the Little Red Wagon Foundation. Bonner's story was selected from among a pool of 6,000 candidates. After the number of candidates was narrowed to 12, Bonner's story was unanimously chosen. Praising Bonner for his philanthropy, Guillen said that "[h]e's sincere. He's humble. He's generous. He's everything that is good about our country. So... when I see Zach, I see the future of our country, and I think we're going to be in good hands."

Patrick Sheane Duncan is the movie's screenwriter, and David Anspaugh is its director. The John Templeton Foundation funded the film which was produced by Michael Guillen of Philanthropy Project, Barbara Kelly, and Steve Golin and David Kanter of Anonymous Content. Little Red Wagon was filmed in May 2010.

== Personal life ==
Zach L. Bonner was born in Searcy, Arkansas on November 17, 1997. He lives in a single-parent household after losing his father in a motorcycle accident and now resides in Valrico, Tampa, Florida with his mother Laurie and sister Kelley. Bonner's mother is a real estate agent and investor. His sister is about 10 years older than he is.

Bonner took classes on the Internet through the K12 Florida Virtual Instruction Program. The online program allowed him to keep up in his studies by working outside of the typical school day. In his free time in 2007, Bonner played little league baseball. He also played tennis and went on bike rides with his friends. When he was three years old, Bonner joined Taekwondo's junior program and after years of study, he subsequently earned a black belt.

In a November 2007 interview with The Independent Florida Alligator, he said he wished to go to college at Harvard University and attend Yale Law School, so that he can become a prosecutor. In a January 2013 interview with Canada.com, he confirmed that he still wanted to become a lawyer, noting that he was unsure about whether he wanted to be a prosecutor or specialize in family law. That same month, he told The Christian Post that he wanted to study law to "be able to tie in the [Little Red Wagon] Foundation and continue to help more people".

A February 2017 article in the Tampa Bay Times noted that Bonner attended the Brandon campus of Hillsborough Community College during high school, and presently works at Apple Inc. in a retail capacity After high school, he attended the University of Florida where he studied Computer Science and Software Engineering.
