= D. J. Caruso =

American screenwriter and director (born 1965)

D.J. Caruso
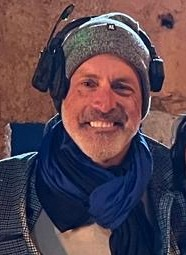
- Caruso in 2024
- Born: Daniel John Caruso Jr. January 17, 1965 (age 61); Norwalk, Connecticut, U.S.
- Education: Pepperdine University
- Occupations: Director, producer
- Years active: 1988–present
- Spouse: Holly Kuespert (m. 1990)
- Children: 5

Daniel John Caruso Jr. (/kəˈruːsoʊ/; born January 17, 1965) is an American film and television director, screenwriter, and producer. His work encompasses a variety of genres, including thriller (Disturbia, Taking Lives), drama (Standing Up), horror (The Disappointments Room), and action (I Am Number Four, XXX: Return of Xander Cage). He has also directed episodes of television series such as The Shield, Over There, Smallville, and Dark Angel.

== Early life and education ==
Caruso was born in Norwalk, Connecticut, the son of Lorraine (Zullo) and Daniel John Caruso, who owned a salon, House of Beauty. He is of Italian descent. He graduated from Norwalk High School in 1983. He is a graduate of Pepperdine University in Malibu, California.

== Career ==
Caruso began his career as a protégé of director John Badham, acting as producer and second unit director on films like Point of No Return, Drop Zone, and Nick of Time. He directed multiple episodes of television series like High Incident and Beyond Belief: Fact or Fiction, in addition to two made-for-television films.

His feature film directorial debut was The Salton Sea, a stylish 2002 crime thriller starring Val Kilmer and Vincent D'Onofrio that has since gained minor cult status. Caruso next directed the Angelina Jolie and Ethan Hawke-starring psychological thriller film Taking Lives. The film was released in theaters on March 19, 2004, but did not meet box office expectations, grossing $65,470,529 from a $35 million budget. However, the film proved to be a success on home video, holding its place as the number one best-selling DVD for three straight weeks. Two for the Money was Caruso's next film which was considered "a well done sport thriller, but with too many details". The film was released on October 7, 2005, and was a moderate success, grossing $30,526,509 worldwide with a modest budget of $18 million. It was later released on DVD on January 17, 2006.

In 2007, Caruso was asked by Steven Spielberg to direct Disturbia. The movie was Caruso's first big hit, grossing over $117 million on a $20 million budget. It starred Shia LaBeouf, Sarah Roemer, David Morse, Aaron Yoo, and Carrie-Anne Moss. It was released April 13, 2007 in theaters and on DVD August 7. Eagle Eye was Caruso's second collaboration with producer Spielberg and actor LaBeouf. It also starred Michelle Monaghan, Billy Bob Thornton, Rosario Dawson and was released in theaters September 26, 2008. Critical reactions were mixed to negative but, on its opening weekend the movie grossed $29.1 million in 3,510 theaters in the United States and Canada. As of 2017, it has grossed $201 million worldwide with a movie budget of $80 million.

He directed the YA novel adaptation I Am Number Four in 2011, which film grossed $161 million worldwide, but failed to build enough interest for an intended sequel. Two years later, he fulfilled a long-time passion project with the coming-of-age film Standing Up, the director's first family film. It is based on Brock Cole's novel, The Goats. The film stars Chandler Canterbury and Annalise Basso as two geeky children who embark on a journey of discovery and self-discovery after they are stripped naked and left stranded together on an island as part of a summer camp prank. Caruso began adapting the novel in the early nineties with then-partner Ken Aguado, who produced the film. Standing Up was produced for a small budget of $3 million and was released on August 16, 2013.

In August 2013, Caruso planned to direct the film adaptation of the comic Preacher. Caruso was also working on a film titled Selling Time, a supernatural thriller potentially starring Will Smith, about a man who is given the unique opportunity to relive the worst day of his life, in exchange for seven years off his own life expectancy. Both projects have since fallen through, with the former property being adapted into a hit television series aired on AMC.

He was a guest judge on the Fox reality television show On the Lot for the episode of May 28 and 29 in 2007. Caruso directed his first music video in 2007 for the song "Don't Make Me Wait" by This World Fair. In 2009, he directed the music video for Airborne Toxic Event's song "Sometime Around Midnight".

On April 2, 2015, Caruso was hired to direct the third installment in the G.I. Joe film series, with Aaron Berg writing the screenplay. October 2015, actor and producer Vin Diesel had Caruso sign on as the director of XXX: Return of Xander Cage. The film debuted at number one and made $347 million worldwide.

Caruso directed the film Redeeming Love, based on Francine Rivers' 1991 novel of the same name, after "he fell in love with the characters and the story when his wife introduced him to the novel". The film was set for a spring 2021 release, but was rescheduled to early 2022.

In 2024, Caruso directed the film Mary for Netflix, which follows the life of Mary, mother of Jesus. The film faced backlash over the decision to cast Israeli actors over Palestinian actors; Caruso has stated that, "It was important to us that Mary, along with most of our primary cast, be selected from Israel to ensure authenticity." That same year, he directed the documentary miniseries Bronx Zoo '90: Crime, Chaos and Baseball.

== Personal life ==
Caruso married actress Holly Kuespert on July 6, 1990. They have five children. He is Catholic.

== Filmography ==
=== Film ===
Year	Title	Director	Writer
2002	The Salton Sea	Yes	No
2004	Taking Lives	Yes	No
2005	Two for the Money	Yes	No
2007	Disturbia	Yes	No
2008	Eagle Eye	Yes	No
2011	I Am Number Four	Yes	No
2011	Inside	Yes	Yes
2013	Standing Up	Yes	Yes
2016	The Disappointments Room	Yes	Yes
2017	XXX: Return of Xander Cage	Yes	No
2022	Redeeming Love	Yes	Yes
2022	Shut In	Yes	No
2024	Mary	Yes	No

Other credits

Year	Title	2nd Unit Director	Producer
1991	The Hard Way	No	Associate
1993	Point of No Return	Yes	Associate
1993	Another Stakeout	Yes	Co-producer
1994	Drop Zone	Yes	Yes
1995	Nick of Time	Yes	Executive
2002	Crazy as Hell	No	Yes
2017	The Tribes of Palos Verdes	No	Executive

=== Television ===
Year	Title	Notes
1996	VR.5	1 episode
1996–97	High Incident	4 episodes
1997	Beyond Belief: Fact or Fiction	8 episodes Wrote 1 episode
1998	Mercy Point	1 episode
1998	Buddy Faro	1 episode
1999	Martial Law	1 episode
1999	The Strip	1 episode
2001	Dark Angel	1 episode
2001	Going to California	4 episodes
2002	Robbery Homicide Division	2 episodes
2002	Smallville	1 episode
2002–06	The Shield	4 episodes
2005	Over There	1 episode
2024	Bronx Zoo '90: Crime, Chaos and Baseball	Documentary series; 4 episodes

Executive producer only

- Rebound: The Legend of Earl "The Goat" Manigault (1996) (TV movie)
