= Justin Tinucci =

American actor, musician and professional

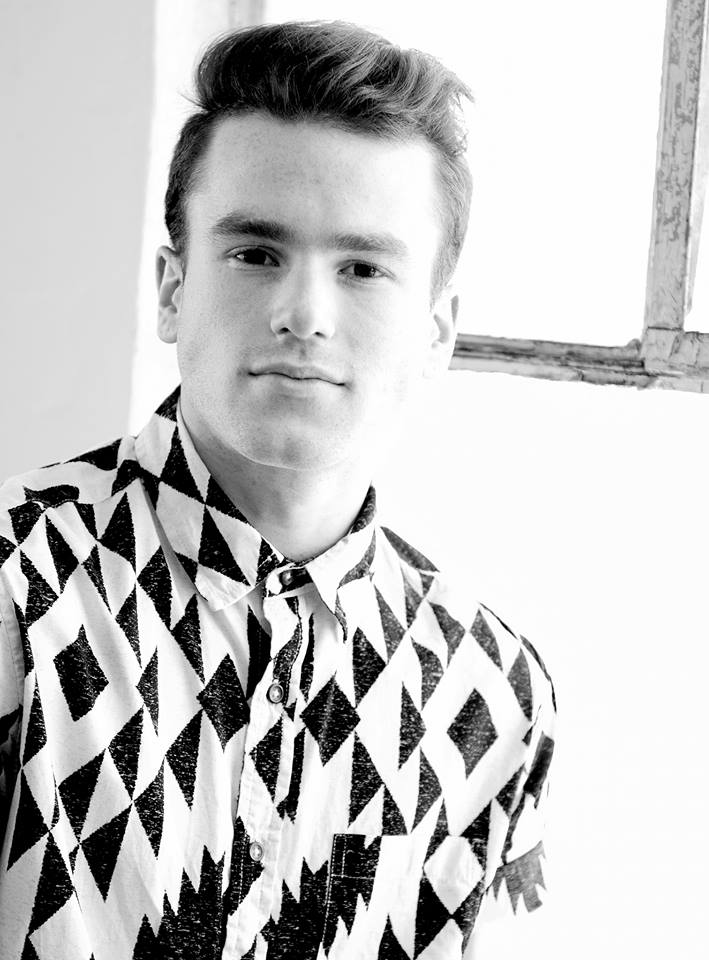
- Born: January 14, 1999 (age 27); Denver, Colorado, U.S.
- Education: California State University, Northridge
- Occupations: Actor, musician
- Years active: 2002–present

Justin Tinucci (born January 14, 1999) is an American actor and musician. He was a recurring guest in Incredible Crew and acted in iCarly, Big Love, Trophy Wife and the Netflix show Lady Dynamite where he plays Jason. He also appeared in Devil's Whisper in 2017.

== Early life ==
Tinucci was born in Denver, Colorado. After a brief appearance on iCarly at the age of 10, he moved to California along with his family to pursue his interest in acting.

== Personal life ==
Tinucci joined California State University at Northridge to pursue a degree in media composition.

== Acting career ==
At the beginning of his career, Tinucci appeared in several shorts including I Love You Daddy, Stanley, Recess and A Story of Beauty. He has also appeared in supporting roles in The Muppets and the feature film Standing Up. (also known as Goat Island) alongside Chandler Canterbury, Annalise Basso and Val Kilmer. His role in this film earned him a nomination to the 35th Young Artist Award for Best Supporting Young Actor in a Feature Film.

Tinucci has also appeared as a recurring guest star on Incredible Crew, and as a guest star on HBO's Big Love, ABC's Trophy Wife and Lady Dynamite.

In 2016, he was cast for a large supporting role in the feature film Devil's Whisper.

== Filmography ==
=== Film ===
Year	Title	Role	Notes
2009	I Love You Daddy (Short)	Taro Lin	
2010	Stanley	Dwayne	
2010	Recess (Short)	Robbie	
2010	My First Claire (Short)	Bernie	
2010	Left and Gone (Short)	Justin	
2010	Courage (Short)	Boy with red hair	
2010	A Story of Beauty (Short)	Sean Baker – Junior High	
2011	Young Man Conan (Short)	Lead	
2011	The Muppets	Laughing Kid	
2011	The Man who Could Lift Pianos	Mick	
2012	Reverb	Jonas	
2013	Standing Up	Butch	Nominated for Best Supporting Young Actor in a Feature Film at the 35th Young Artist Awards
2017	Devil's Whisper	Everett	
2018	The Goldbergs: 1990-Something	Everett	TV Film
2021	Agent Revelation	Peter	

=== Television ===
Year	Title	Role	Notes
2002	Noggin's Story Time	Baby Bear	Voice role
2009	Disney XD's Skyrunners Testimonials	Charlie	Episode: "Press Conference - Ice Cream"
2009	iCarly	Justin	Episode: "iCarly Awards"
2011	Big Love	Ryan Beisinger	Episode: "Winter"
2012–2013	Incredible Crew	Justin	3 episodes
2013	Trophy Wife	Masked Teen	Episode: "Halloween"
2013	The Music Project	Shoe Crew Halloween Concert Bash	
2016	Lady Dynamite	Jason	Episode: "Mein Ramp"
2017	Record Rant	Justin	
2018	The Fosters	Senior	Episode: "Line in the Sand"
2019	Schooled	D Spink	
2020	Perry Mason	Frat Guy	Episode: "Chapter Seven"
