= Standing up =

Standing Up may refer to:

- The act of standing or orthostasis
- Standing Up, a 2013 coming-of-age film based on the novel The Goats, written by Brock Cole
