= Cutaway (2000 film) =

- Film poster
- Genre: Action; Crime
- Screenplay by: Greg Manos; Guy Manos
- Story by: Tony Griffin; Greg Manos; Guy Manos
- Directed by: Guy Manos
- Starring: Tom Berenger; Stephen Baldwin; Dennis Rodman; Maxine Bahns; Casper Van Dien; Thomas Ian Nicholas; Phillip Glasser; Marcos Ferraez; Adam Wylie; Roy Ageloff; Ron Silver
- Music by: Larry Brown
- Country of origin: United States
- Original language: English

Production
- Executive producers: H. Charles George; Sam Blount; Greg Manos
- Producers: Adam Stone; David C. Glasser
- Cinematography: Gerry Lively
- Editor: Martin Hunter
- Running time: 104 minutes
- Production companies: Cutting Edge Entertainment; Golden ParaShoot Entertainment

Original release
- Network: USA Network
- Release: October 3, 2000

Cutaway is a 2000 American crime action television film about skydiving, co-written and directed by Guy Manos. The term "cut-away" is used frequently in the film, in reference to parachuting and also in reference to life in general. Cutaway stars Tom Berenger, Stephen Baldwin, Dennis Rodman, Maxine Bahns, Ron Silver, Casper Van Dien and Thomas Ian Nicholas. This was Rodman's third film. It aired on the USA Network on October 3, 2000.

== Plot ==
When U.S. Customs agent Vic Cooper's personnel file is reviewed, it shows that he struggles to disassociate his undercover identities from his real one. Despite the file's recommendation that he not return to active duty, he is cleared for work by Lieutenant Brian Margate. His first action back is a raid on a Bimini-based seafood importer, who Cooper believes is smuggling drugs. He is embarrassed to find only shrimp on the aircraft, and the pilot goes free.

Because Cooper personally witnessed drugs being loaded onto the aircraft, he realizes that the only way that they could have been offloaded during the flight is via parachute. He visits a random drop zone and pretends to be interested in taking lessons. Star shows him around and introduces him to the jump team that runs the camp. Cooper and Star begin flirting immediately, and he enjoys his lessons. She explains how most people there have "cut away" from their old lives to focus just on skydiving. The term also refers to cutting away from your main chute to use your reserve.

Cooper gets Margate to approve more undercover work, and he visits the Army jump team for some tips from their leader Delmira. When he returns to the dive camp much improved, Randy "Turbo" Kingston is skeptical of Cooper and remains aloof. As Cooper's dives improve, the leader of the team, Red Line, takes an interest in him. Eventually, Cooper is allowed to join the team. As his proficiency increases, he is able to enter the formation faster, which moves him further back in the roster towards Red Line, who always comes out last because he is the fastest diver. This causes internal tension, as well as hurting his romance with Star.

Eventually, Turbo can no longer stand to see Cooper moving closer to his position in front of Red Line. During one dive, Red Line makes Turbo and Cooper fight to see who is the fastest. Turbo goes into a nose dive to move at maximum speed, but he breaks his neck when he plows into the team formation. With Turbo dead, Cooper is elevated to Red Line's second in command, which means that he has to take on Turbo's responsibility with helping Red Line raise money to fund the team.

Red Line takes him on a job with the Bimini seafood importer. Prior to landing on Bimini, Cooper and Red Line jump out of the aircraft. They retrieve the drugs which are hidden just off the runway. Meanwhile, the pilot loads her official cargo and clears customs. Cooper and Red Line sneak back on the aircraft with the drugs, and then they dive off the aircraft again to a buyer's house. They pick up enough money to fund 100 more dives.

Cooper and Red Line go on a series of jumps like this, until they end up at one where the FBI has a sting operation in place. When the FBI raids the party where Cooper and Red Line have arrived with the drugs, Lt. Margate's team moves in. In the ensuing gun fight, Red Line and Lt. Margate end up facing each other with guns drawn. Cooper tackles Red Line, and they jump off the roof together. Red Line is severely injured though, but Cooper forces the team to move forward to the Nationals, where the Army team is waiting to beat them again.

Though badly impaired, Red Line manages to jump with the team, and they are competitive through the first few rounds, until a bad mistake leaves them needing a world record time to beat Army. Before the final jump, Red Line moves Cooper into his position, and the team records a 9.90 second formation jump, establishing a world record and winning the Nationals. As they are floating to the ground, Cooper reveals his identity and arrests Red Line. Not surprised at the news, Red Line stoically cuts away from his main chute and falls to the ground as he commits suicide. Cooper mourns Red Line's death, and walks away from Margate towards his dive team.

== Cast ==
- Tom Berenger as "Red Line"
- Stephen Baldwin as US Customs Agent Victor "Vic" Cooper
- Dennis Rodman as Randy "Turbo" Kingston
- Maxine Bahns as "Star"
- Ron Silver as Lieutenant Brian Margate
- Roy Ageloff as "Boom-Boom"
- Marcos Ferraez as "Ground Rush"
- Adam Wylie as Cal
- Thomas Ian Nicholas as "Rip"
- Phillip Glasser as "Cord"
- Casper Van Dien as Delmira

== Production ==
Cutaway features numerous aerial skydiving stunts with much of the film shot in Florida at Homestead, Miami-Dade County, Opa Locka, and in the Fort Bragg, U.S. Army base, North Carolina. Towards the end of the film, paratroopers jump vertically from the Sebastian Municipal Airport, located between Vero Beach and Melbourne, Florida.

=== Aircraft in the film ===
In Cutaway, the main characters are skydivers, but aircraft are showcased. The "jump" aircraft are:

- CASA C-212-S1 Aviocar c/n 272, N433CA, CASA C-212 Aviocar-200, c/n 286, N434CA
- Cessna 182H s/n 18256107, N2007X
- Cessna 208 Caravan, c/n 20800121, N9639F
- de Havilland Canada DHC-6 Twin Otter, c/n 200, N123FX, c/n 223, N223AL
- Short SC.7 Skyvan, c/n SH.1845, N101FX

Since much of the film was shot at airports, a number of other aircraft were seen in the background:

- Boeing 727-200, c/n 20937, N495AJ
- Stout Bushmaster 2000, c/n 2 N750RW
- De Havilland Canada DHC-6 Twin Otter Series 400
- Lockheed L-1049H Super Constellation (TWA) c/n 4830, N6937C
- Fokker C-31A Troopship (Note: Fokker F27-400M is the military version for US Army with the designation C-31A Troopship, and was still in use in 2016, with the U.S. Army Parachute Team, the "Golden Knights".)
- Piper PA-31T Cheyenne II, YV-187CP and N49RB)
- Piper PA-31P Mojave N9235Y

== Reception ==
Aviation film historian Christian Santoir characterized Cutaway "... (as) in the same vein as The Gypsy Moths (1969) by John Frankenheimer, Drop Zone (1994) by John Badham, or Terminal velocity (1994) by Deran Sarafian. It features spectacular scenes of skydiving, very well filmed by Norman Kent, and supplemented by stock footage. Airplanes are everywhere, but as means of transport, nothing more."
