= Norman Kent =

Norman Kent may refer to:

- Norman A. Kent, skydiver, stunt man, and aerial cinematographer
- Norm Kent (Norman Elliott Kent), American criminal defence attorney, publisher and radio talk show host
- Norman Kent, a fictional character, gallant partner of Simon Templar in the novel The Last Hero

== See also ==
- Kent Norman, American cognitive psychologist and an expert on computer rage
