= Little Red Wagon =

- Theatrical release poster
- Little Red Wagon
- Directed by: David Anspaugh
- Screenplay by: Patrick Sheane Duncan
- Produced by: Michael A. Guillen; David Kanter
- Starring: Anna Gunn; Daveigh Chase; Frances O'Connor; Chandler Canterbury
- Cinematography: Mihai Mălaimare Jr.
- Music by: Jeff Beal
- Distributed by: Phase 4 Films
- Release date: October 5, 2012
- Running time: 104 minutes
- Country: United States
- Budget: US$5 million

Little Red Wagon is a 2012 docudrama directed by David Anspaugh and written by Patrick Sheane Duncan. The film stars Anna Gunn, Daveigh Chase, Frances O'Connor, and Chandler Canterbury.

Little Red Wagon covers Zach Bonner's philanthropic work as founder of the Little Red Wagon Foundation. It begins with his volunteer work gathering food and supplies for survivors in the aftermath of Hurricane Charley's carnage. The film then details his walks across the United States between 2007 and 2010 totaling 4,263 miles (6,861 km) to draw attention to the plight of homeless children. Filmed in and around Charleston, South Carolina in May 2010, Little Red Wagon cost a reported US$5 million to produce.

The film received mixed reviews. Reviewers praised it for being inspiring and making tangible how aiding the homeless significantly affects their lives for the better. Other reviewers found the film's plot too simplified, finding that aside from the sibling rivalry between Bonner and his sister, the film lacked conflict, an imperative component of a drama. They also found some parts of the film unrealistic such as the portrayal of homelessness and the managing of a non-profit organization.

== Synopsis ==
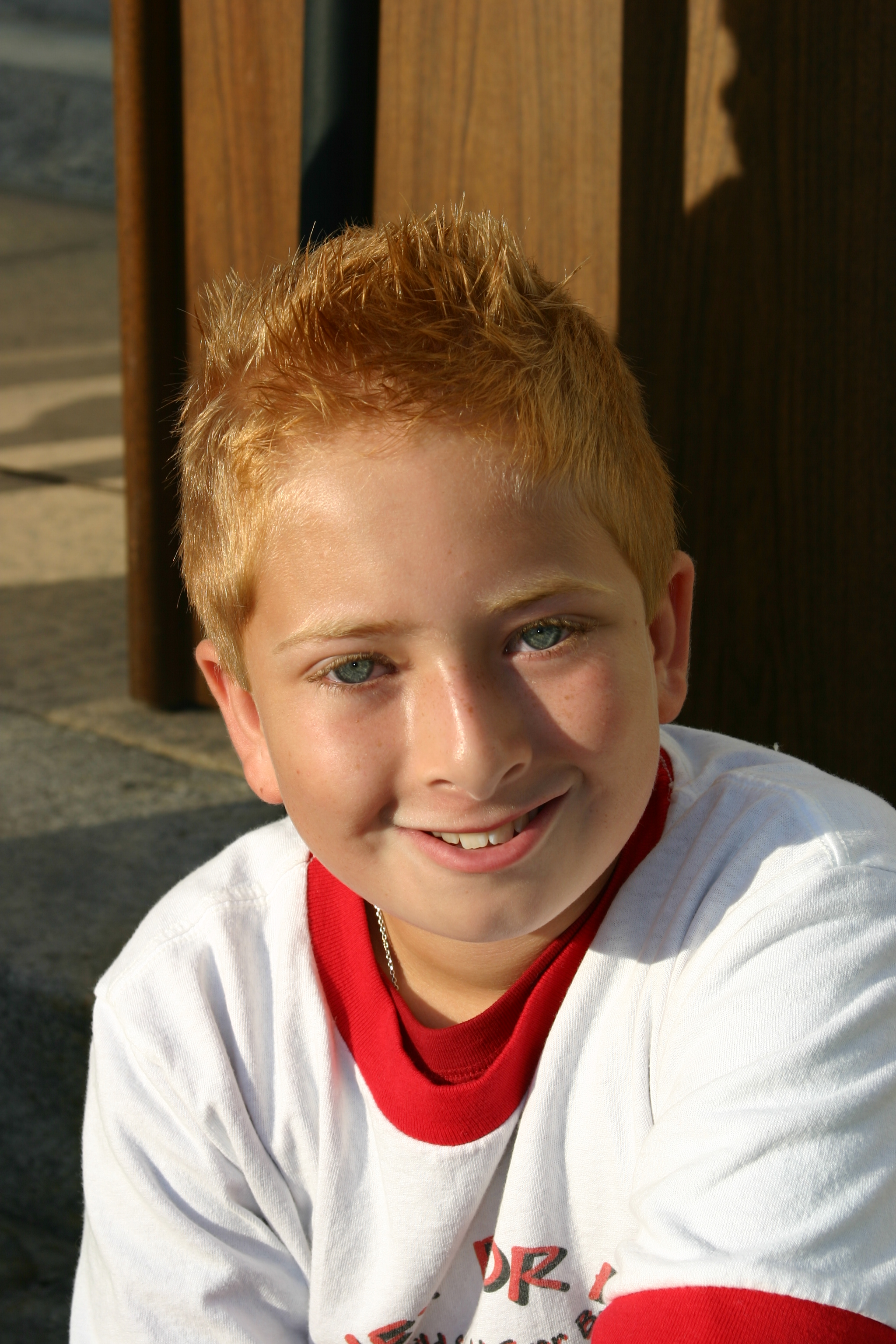
Head shot of Zach Bonner in 2008

In the opening scene of Little Red Wagon, real news footage filmed in 2004 of Hurricane Charley and the storm's aftermath is shown. While Bonner and his family take shelter in Tampa from the storm, Bonner sees on television the widespread destruction caused by the hurricane. His volunteerism begins at that moment when he decides to canvass for food and other necessities for Hurricane Charley survivors.

Accompanied by his older sister Kelley, Bonner goes door-to-door with his red wagon to solicit donations. A year later, as an eight-year-old, he starts a non-profit organization, the Little Red Wagon Foundation, to aid marginalized children, particularly homeless adolescents. Bonner's foundation spearheads a backpack project, in which backpacks nicknamed "Zackpacks" are filled with food, personal hygiene materials, candy, toys, and other materials and given to marginalized children.

Between 2007 and 2010, Bonner walks 4,263 miles (6,861 km) to draw attention to the plight of homeless children. In 2007, he walks from Tampa, Florida, where he lives, to Tallahassee, while in 2008, he treks from Tallahassee to Atlanta, Georgia. In 2009, he hikes from Atlanta to Washington, D.C., and in 2010, he walks from the Atlantic to the Pacific Ocean. Interspersed throughout Zach's walks are switches between refreshing scenes of teamwork and family disputes sparked by shouting bouts between Zach's mother and sister.

A subplot is injected into the story so that viewers are able to observe the palpable effects of homelessness. Margaret Craig, a young mother who has been recently widowed, finds it increasingly difficult to support her young son Jim. Laurie and Margaret see each other in the film's opening when Laurie is collecting donations for hurricane victims. Later in the film, Margaret and her son become destitute and homeless after she becomes unemployed. They are transformed into the poverty-stricken individuals their past neighbors have begun to aid.

After the duo are unable to pay for a tiny apartment, they begin sleeping in their car. Upon finding the mother and son, a policeman directs them to a homeless shelter. The following day, they are downtrodden when they find nearly all of their belongings gone, forcing them to resort later to shoplifting and dumpster diving. At the film's closing, the subplot intersects with the main plot in a heartening incident demonstrating how altruism incalculably alters the path of a destitute person's circumstances.

== Cast ==
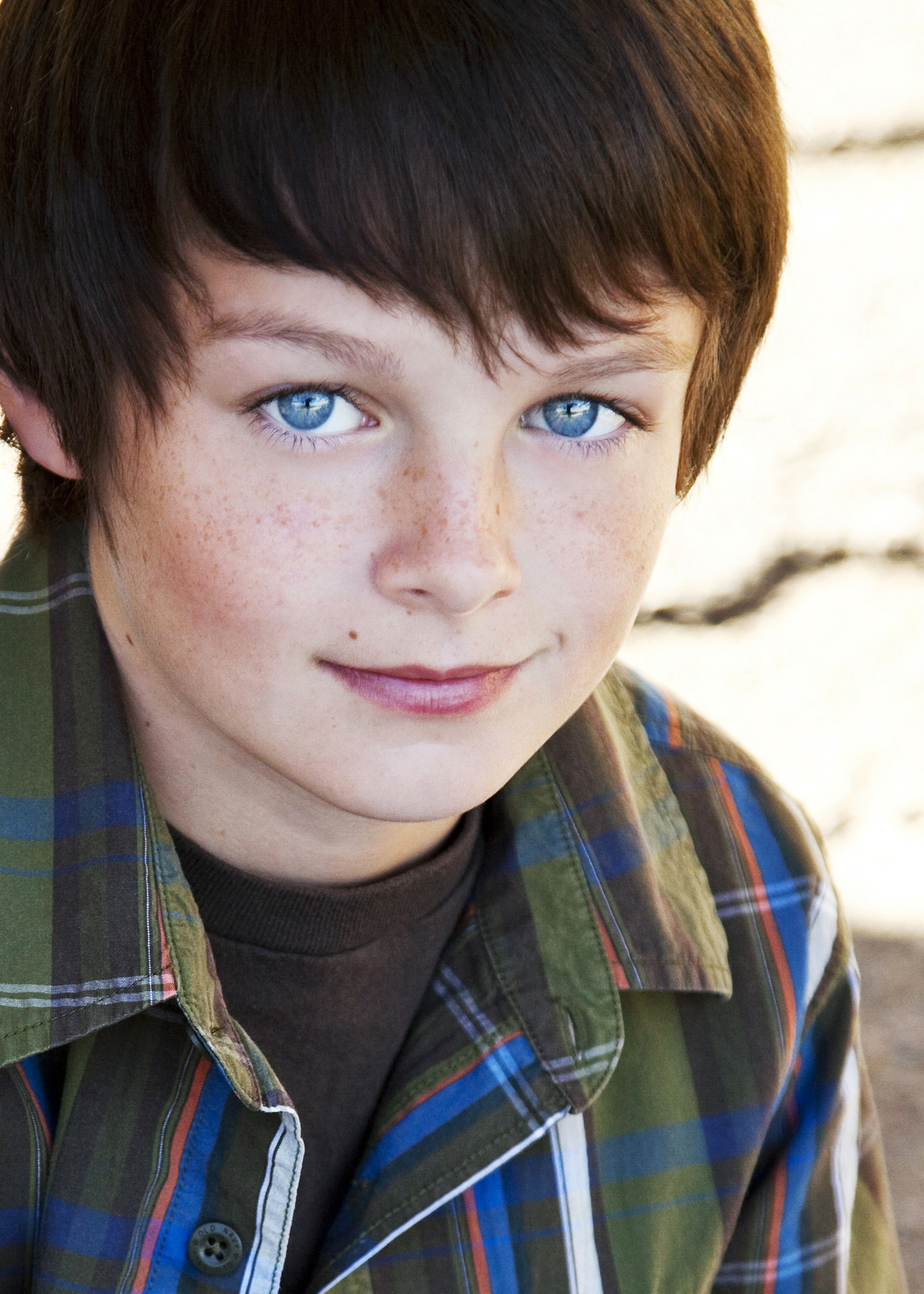
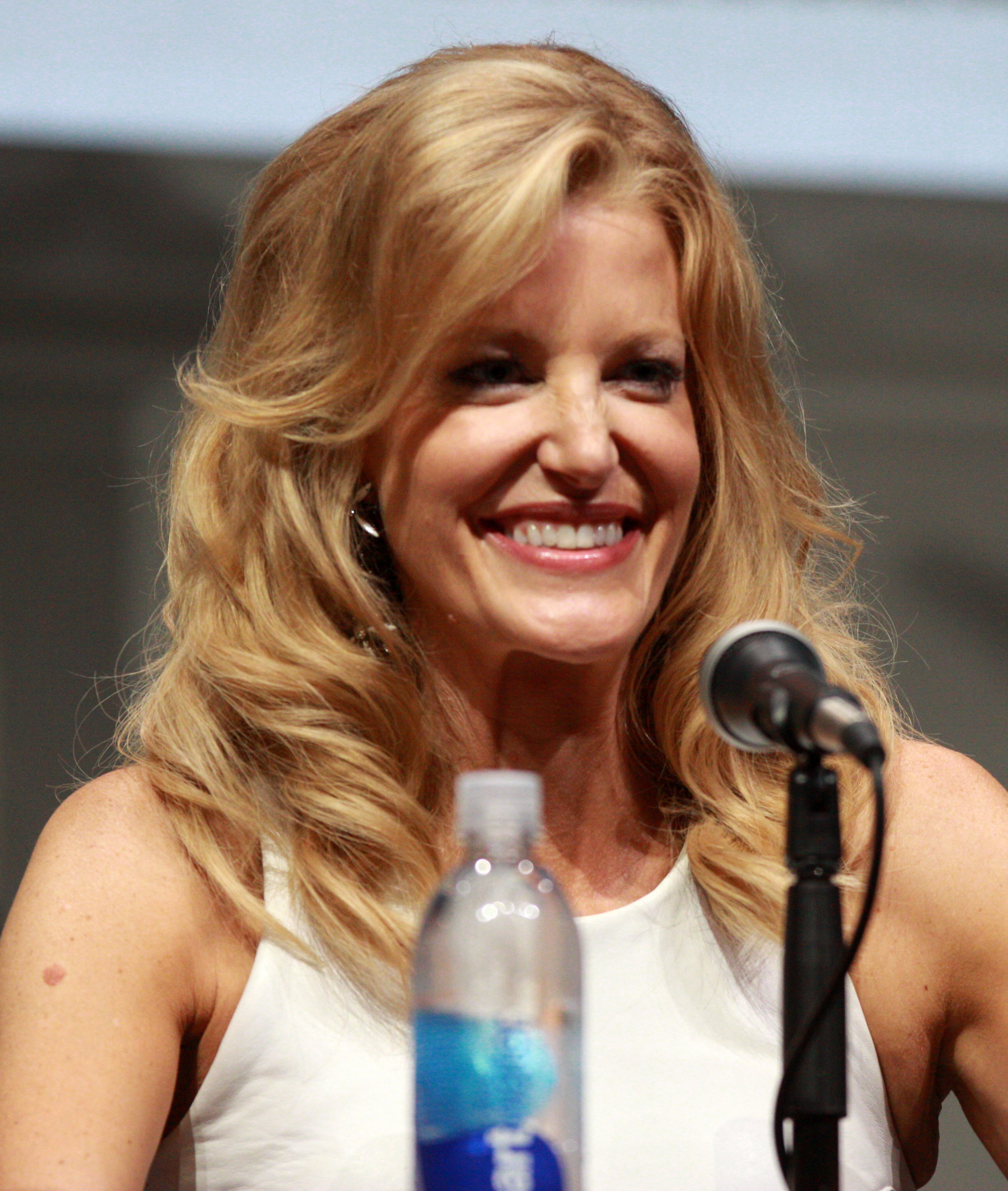
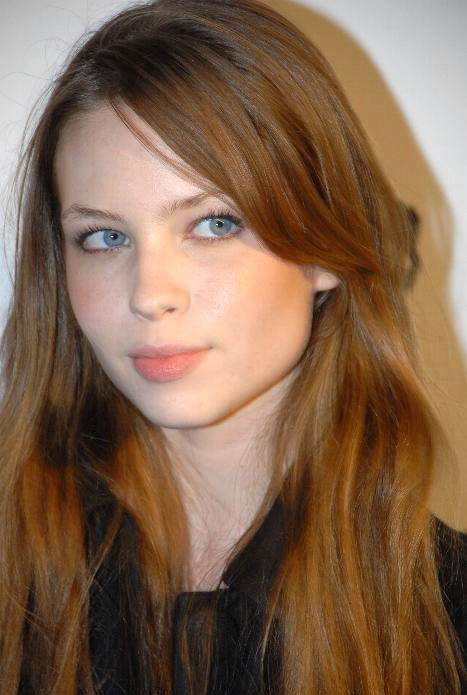
Chandler Canterbury, Anna Gunn, and Daveigh Chase in the film as, respectively, Zach Bonner, Laurie Bonner and Kelley Bonner.
- Chandler Canterbury as Zach Bonner.

McClatchy-Tribune News Service film critic Roger Moore praised Canterbury's performance as "quite good", writing that "young Canterbury gives us several lump-in-your-throat moments as the innocent Zach asks why he can't try to do this or that".

- Anna Gunn as Laurie Bonner, Zach's mother.

Laurie is a single mother who was plunged into widowhood while Zach was still an infant. She finds difficulty striking a balance between supporting her son, Zach, and Kelley, her teenage daughter. Gunn, wrote Crosswalk.com's Debbie Holloway, "gives a soulful portrayal of a strong mother desperately trying to stand behind the noble passions of her son, which often conflic[t] with Kelley’s need for independence and individual attention".

Bonner said that he had little involvement in the film's casting but found that the chosen actors "could not have been better" such as actress Gunn who he found played his mother with incredible accuracy. Bonner said in an interview with The Christian Post that when she "delivered one of the lines exactly like my mother, I thought to myself, 'wow'." Film critic Steve Persall of the Tampa Bay Times praised Gunn's depiction of Zach's sympathetic mother as "solid", a polar opposite from her "steeliness" as Skyler White in the television crime drama series Breaking Bad.

- Daveigh Chase as Kelley Bonner, Zach's sister.

In the film, Kelley, Zach's teenage sister, feels exasperated because she becomes trapped in the middle of a media circus. Other than the sibling rivalry between Zach and Kelley, there is very little conflict in Little Red Wagon. Inventing the word "dramatatized", Zach explained in a telephone interview with the Tampa Bay Times that "like with any movie that's based on a true story, it's a little dramatatized, I guess to make it a more interesting. She's a little mean in the movie but she's a great person in real life."

- Frances O'Connor as Margaret Craig, a homeless mother whose husband recently died.
- Dylan Matzke as Margaret Craig's young son.

== Production ==
Now that others can finally see this story through a Hollywood scripted film, we hope that it will bring a lot of awareness to the problem. That will help us help more people.

— Zach Bonner in a November 2012 interview with the Deseret News

The non-profit organization Philanthropy Project produced Little Red Wagon, which was planned to be a movie about Zach Bonner and his walks. In 2009, Michael Guillen, the CEO of Philanthropy Project, planned to make a US$5 million movie about the Little Red Wagon Foundation. Bonner's story was selected from among a pool of 6,000 candidates. After the number of candidates was narrowed to 12, Bonner's story was unanimously chosen.

Praising Bonner for his philanthropy, Guillen said that "[h]e's sincere. He's humble. He's generous. He's everything that is good about our country. So... when I see Zach, I see the future of our country, and I think we're going to be in good hands." After Bonner was told that Philanthropy Project would create a movie about him, he hung his head and sobbed, replying, "But I'm so small."

The film's director was David Anspaugh, who had previously directed the sports films Hoosiers and Rudy. Little Red Wagon cost US$5 million to produce. Filmed in May 2010 in and around Charleston, South Carolina, the movie's theatrical release was on October 5, 2012, and its DVD release was on January 8, 2013.

== Themes ==
Crosswalk.com's Debbie Holloway wrote that the film "points to several important truths". First, tangible wealth and "even the humblest of possessions" can without notice vanish, be ruined, or be robbed. Second, the loss of a father or a husband significantly scars the life of a child or mother, respectively. Third, relationships are far more crucial—and far more difficult—to nurture than lofty dreams. Fourth, the indigent always will live amid the audience who are capable of helping the poor more frequently than they actually act. Fifth, a person's youth does not inhibit him or her from effecting positive change in the world. Sixth, stealing, fighting, and self-centeredness are framed as undesirable traits. Holloway wrote that "the belief in something bigger than yourself is the main theme" in Little Red Wagon.

Hannah Goodwyn of the Christian Broadcasting Network wrote that the altruism depicted in Little Red Wagon is "inspiring". She found that although the film did not discuss faith, it had an unambiguous biblical message that people should act selflessly and consider others.

== Reception ==
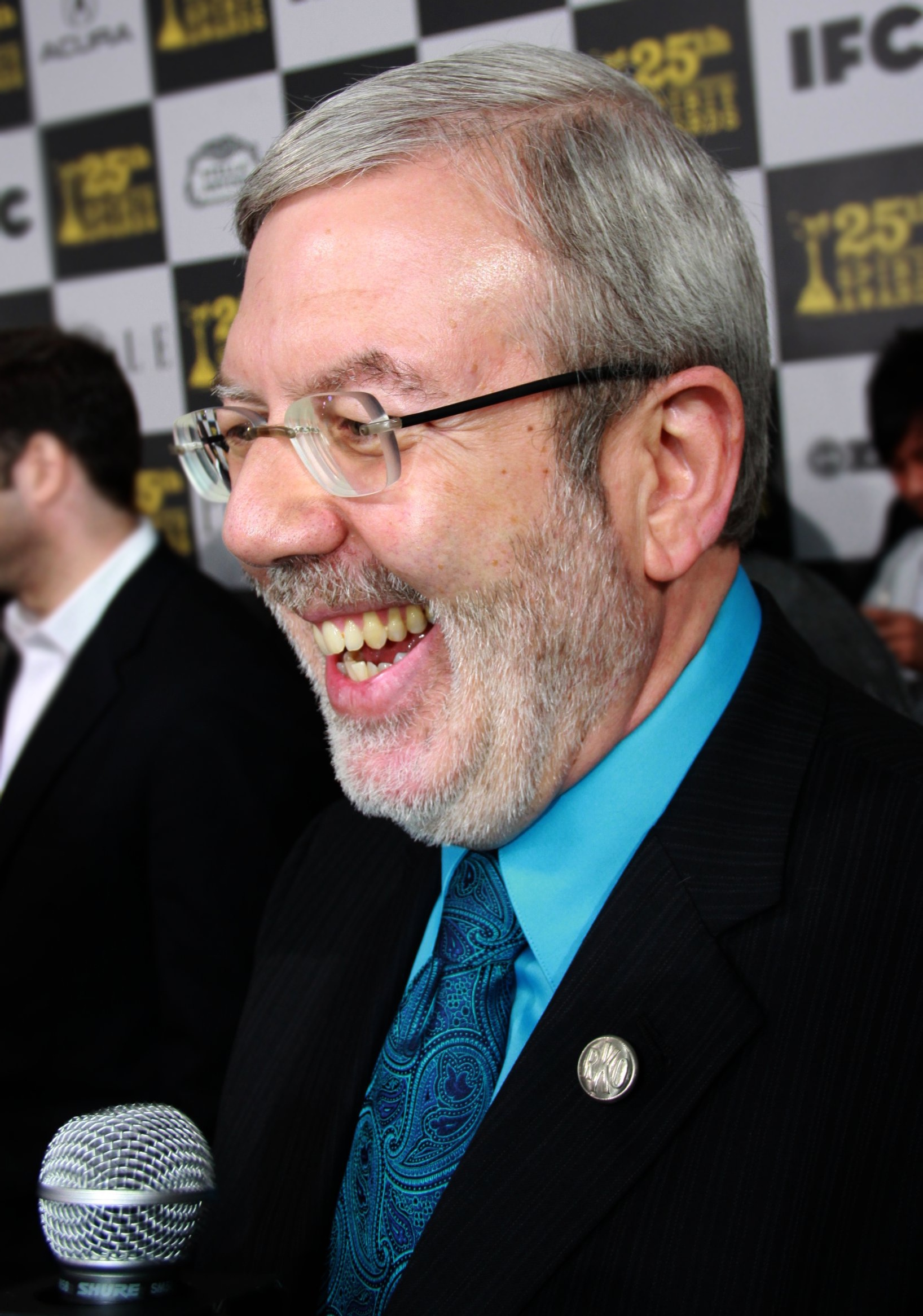
Film critic Leonard Maltin praised Chandler Canterbury for his "winning, and completely convincing" depiction of Zach Bonner.

The Christian Post's Emma Koonse called the film the "heartwarming true story of one little boy's dream to end the suffering of those without homes". Giving Little Red Wagon three stars, Steve Salles wrote in the Standard-Examiner that the story was "inspiring and humbling". Columbia College Chicago adjunct professor Brian Costello wrote for Common Sense Media that "for a 'movie with a message', this is among the best to come out in recent years, and should inspire discussion -- and perhaps action -- amongst families about the issues they care about the most".

Steve Persall of the Tampa Bay Times said Little Red Wagon "is such a sweetly inspiring story" and "a movie with a heart as big as Zach's and an endlessly wholesome way of expressing it". Giving the movie a B+, Persall said that although Little Red Wagon is a "nice movie", it is "probably too much so for viewers seeking meatier drama". Also criticizing the lack of drama, Joe Williams of the St. Louis Post-Dispatch gave the film two stars out of four, writing, "There's weighty material waiting to be processed here, but in "Little Red Wagon" it doesn't have a home.

Debbie Holloway of Crosswalk.com wrote that Little Red Wagon's plot is "inspiring, with noteworthy flaws"; she found the dialogue and transitions to be oversimplified on some occasions. For example, Holloway noted that the shifts between significant challenges including creating a non-profit organization and securing a job are overlooked with few of the "real-life mess and pain". She found the young boys in the film to be too flawless and obedient, while Bonner's sister Kelley too closely followed the prototype of a "standard movie rebellious teen". Holloway concluded that despite the movie's flaws, the errors do not sidetrack "too noticeably from the encouraging story and the compelling relationships". Scott Wolfe of The Dove Foundation opined that Little Red Wagon "will move your family from tears of hope to jubilation as they see just how much difference one person can make".

Christian Broadcasting Network reviewer Hannah Goodwyn had a similar view as Holloway's about the film's oversimplified plot and conversations, writing that although "[t]his family-friendly movie has its moving moments, the discerning moviegoer may find the story too simplified". Goodwyn continued, "Unfortunately, the film also has its moments of wanting dialogue, which is surprising given Golden Globe-nominated Patrick Sheane Duncan (Mr. Holland's Opus) wrote it."

Sean Means of The Salt Lake Tribune found that "[t]he melodramatic storyline and moralizing tone are overbearing" and that "only O'Connor's performance rises above the level of a Hallmark Channel rerun". Although Mathew DeKinder wrote that "the acting is wooden, the dialogue is even worse and the plotting is almost nonexistent", he said the film was "redeemed by its subject matter", that of a boy who founds a non-profit organization to assist homeless youth.

Isaac Weeks wrote a mostly negative review of Little Red Wagon, saying that although the film had a strong cast in its three women stars, it was "hamstrung by a too-small budget and a child actor who delivers a performance equally as uninspiring as the final product of the film". Film critic Leonard Maltin disagreed with Weeks' negative view of the child actor's performance. Maltin opined that "Chandler Canterbury is winning, and completely convincing, as Zach Bonner". The film impressed Maltin because "[w]hat could be cloying is played out honestly".

Barbara VanDenburgh of The Arizona Republic gave the film a rating of "[b]omb to bad: 1.5 stars", explaining that Little Red Wagon is "less a movie and more an extended public-service announcement, as comforting as a glass of milk before bed and about as exciting." Finding the film "conflict-free to the point of catatonia", she criticized Little Red Wagon for being unrealistic. For instance, Bonner's philanthropic work is portrayed as being without difficulty. He has no trouble getting companies to donate money to his organization. His single mother, VanDenburgh wrote, has a "dubious Southern accent" and appears not to do any work for her real-estate job. VanDenburgh found the homeless mother and son in the subplot similarly unrealistic because the duo appear perfectly nourished and immaculately clean despite being forced by their indigence to sleep in a car. Furthermore, despite his dire circumstances, the homeless son is content. VanDenburgh concluded that "[t]he film just doesn't have the nerve to get real".

== Screenings ==
Little Red Wagon premiered on October 19, 2012, at Regal Cinemas in Mount Pleasant, South Carolina. 220 people attended the "Hollywood-style red carpet event". The film was screened at Utah's Megaplex 20 on November 30, 2012 and received the Truly Moving Picture Award from Heartland Film Festival. The 2012 Truly Moving Picture Award jury were inspired by Bonner's altruism, wondering how they could join his efforts in aiding the indigent.
