= The Black String =

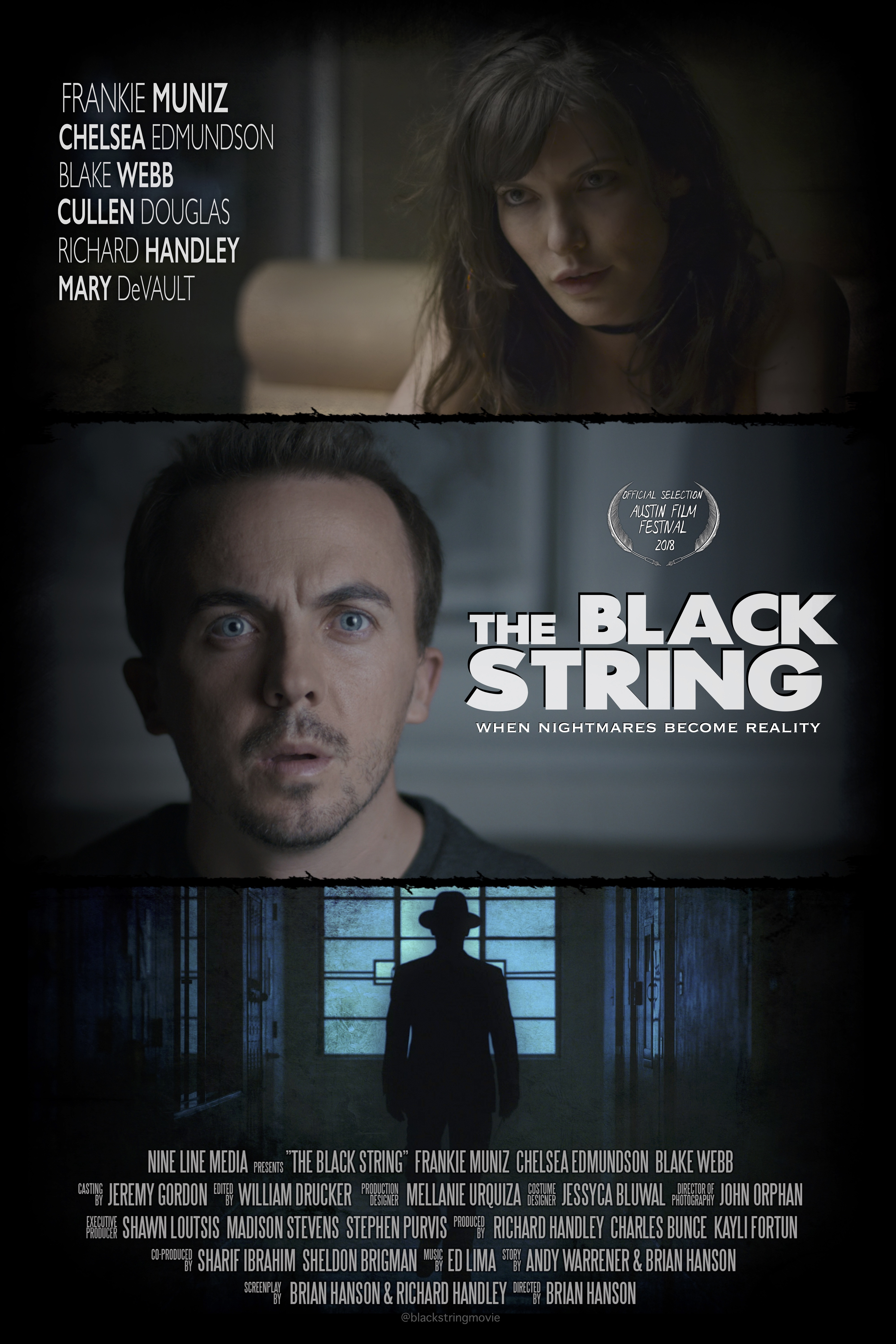
- Austin Film Festival poster
- Directed by: Brian Hanson
- Screenplay by: Brian Hanson; Richard Handley
- Story by: Andy Warrener; Brian Hanson
- Produced by: Richard Handley; Charles Bunce; Kayli Fortun
- Starring: Frankie Muniz; Chelsea Edmundson; Blake Webb; Richard Handley; Mary DeVault
- Cinematography: John Orphan
- Edited by: William Drucker
- Music by: Ed Lima
- Production company: Nine Line Media
- Distributed by: Lionsgate; Launch Releasing
- Release dates: October 25, 2018 (AFF); September 24, 2019 (United States)
- Running time: 93 minutes
- Country: United States
- Language: English

The Black String is a 2018 American psychological horror thriller film directed by Brian Hanson, who co-wrote the screenplay with Richard Handley and developed the story with Andy Warrener. The film stars Frankie Muniz, Chelsea Edmundson, Blake Webb, and Mary DeVault.

The project was announced in 2016 and premiered on the opening night of the 2018 Austin Film Festival. It was later acquired by Lionsgate Home Entertainment for North American distribution in 2019. Between 2019 and 2021, the film was released internationally on video on demand, DVD, and Blu-ray.

== Plot ==
Jonathan Marsh is a socially isolated young man working night shifts at a local liquor store alongside his friend and shift manager, Eric, also known as "The ERC." One night, Jonathan encounters a mysterious and seductive woman on his television screen who urges him to call a 1-900 number. He follows the prompt and soon meets a woman named Dena on a blind date at Jenny's Diner. After the date, she convinces him to bring her back to his apartment, where they spend the night together.

The next morning, Dena is gone, and Jonathan notices a strange rash developing on his abdomen. When he attempts to locate Dena, a man at her address claims she does not live there. Jonathan begins experiencing disturbing visions, and his physical symptoms worsen. His anxiety increases as the rash spreads to his arm. Seeking clarity, he returns to the diner, where he receives a phone call from Eric asking him to come over immediately.

Jonathan arrives at Eric’s home to find the door ajar and Eric missing. While searching the house, he is attacked by an unknown assailant and subsequently arrested by the police. He is placed under the care of psychiatrist Dr. Jason Ronaldi, who admits him to a hospital for a 72 hour observation. After his release into the custody of his parents, Jonathan experiences a hallucination involving a dark, bubbling ooze on his bedroom wall. Panicked, he flees and later wakes up in a remote field.

Seeking answers, Jonathan visits an occult bookstore, where he is advised to meet with Miss Melinda at a location called the Blue High Shack. Miss Melinda informs him that he has been targeted by a witch cult and instructs him to perform a ritual using a ceremonial dagger to remove the "evil" implanted in him. Although the ritual is physically painful, Jonathan fails to extract the entity and returns to Miss Melinda for further guidance. She advises him to confront Dena and the cult directly.

Jonathan sneaks into Dena’s house and finds her imprisoned and severely injured. While attempting to leave, he encounters members of the cult, including the same man who previously denied Dena's existence. Jonathan escapes and returns to the liquor store to seek Eric's help. Eric calls the police, and Jonathan is arrested once again.

He is placed under Dr. Ronaldi's care at a psychiatric hospital. There, he is encouraged to confront his perceived delusions through therapy. That night, Jonathan is attacked by a monstrous figure resembling his hallucinations. The following morning, hospital staff discover Jonathan dead in his bed, holding the ceremonial dagger. His body is severely mutilated, leaving it ambiguous whether he took his own life or was killed by the cult.

In the final scene, a young woman waits at a bus stop when a car carrying the cult members pulls up and offers her a ride. She accepts, and they drive off, implying the cycle is set to repeat.

== Cast ==
- Frankie Muniz as Jonathan Marsh
- Blake Webb as Eric “The ERC”
- Chelsea Edmundson as Dena
- Richard Handley as Dr. Jason Ronaldi
- Cullen Douglas as Man in Black
- Colby French as Mr. Marsh
- Ravi Patel as Dr. May
- Laura Richardson as Mrs Marsh
- Mary K. DeVault as Melinda
- Sharif Ibrahim as Orderly Wally
- Alexander Ward as The Entity
- Oded Fehr as The Father

== Casting ==
Casting director Jeremy Gordon was brought on to circulate the script to talent agents in Los Angeles, California. Toward the end of the casting process, Gordon submitted the script to actor Frankie Muniz through his agency, APA. Muniz was later cast in the lead role. Richard Handley, who served as lead producer, also appeared in the film as the character Dr. Jason Ronaldi.

== Production ==
=== Development and pre-production ===
The Black String originated as a thesis project by Richard Handley and Brian Hanson during their Master of Fine Arts (MFA) program in Film and Television at Mount Saint Mary's University, Los Angeles, California. The story was initially conceived by Hanson and Andy Warrener, with a condensed draft written by Hanson in 2007. A complete rewrite of the screenplay was undertaken by Hanson and Handley in 2015 as part of their MFA thesis, with the final production draft completed after a year of development.

During the final stages of their MFA studies, Hanson and Handley brought on fellow students Charles Bunce and Kayli Fortun as producers. The university provided support for the production, granting access to campus facilities and post-production resources. Sharif Ibrahim later joined the team as co-producer and actor, introducing the filmmakers to the project's primary equity investor. Additional support came from associate producers Marisela Handley and Yani Hanson, who contributed through location management and production accounting, respectively.

Producer Sheldon Brigman was also brought on to the project, assisting in securing global distribution through his company, Launch Releasing. Hanson, Handley, and Brigman had previously collaborated as producers on Devil's Whisper (2017), a psychological horror film directed by Adam Ripp. Many crew members from that production, including first assistant director Liam Finn, were hired to work on The Black String. Over 120 film professionals were involved in the film’s production and distribution over the course of four years.

=== Filming ===
Principal photography for The Black String began in late 2016, with the initial shoot lasting 23 days. Additional pick up shots were scheduled and completed throughout 2017 and 2018. The primary filming location was Santa Clarita, California, with additional scenes shot at various practical locations and studio facilities within the Los Angeles thirty-mile studio zone, including Polsa Rosa Ranch Studios, Middleton Ranch Studios, and Silver Dream Factory Studios.

Many of the psychiatric hospital scenes were filmed on the Chalon campus of Mount Saint Mary’s University, Los Angeles, which had previously served as a filming location for Mel Brooks’ 1977 film High Anxiety. Access to the university campus was facilitated by the filmmakers’ affiliations with the institution, as several members of the production team, including Richard Handley, Brian Hanson, Charles Bunce, and Kayli Fortun, were alumni and faculty. Additional medical and psychiatric facility scenes were filmed at local clinics in Los Angeles through location connections secured by Handley.

Prosthetics and practical makeup effects were provided by Erik Porn’s company, Bitemares. Porn, known for his work on Devil’s Whisper, Buffy The Vampire Slayer, American Horror Story, Teen Wolf, Fear of the Walking Dead, Paranormal Activity 2, and Vice, led the special effects team responsible for the physical transformation of Frankie Muniz’s character, Jonathan. Makeup artist Dan Gilbert created a prosthetic arm piece used during a key sequence in the film.

=== Post-production ===
Initial editing for The Black String was completed by William Drucker in 2016, with director Brian Hanson continuing the editing process over the following year. The film underwent an iterative ieditorial process, during which several scenes and practical effects elements were reshot based on evolving narrative and visual requirements. Feedback from multiple audience test screenings also informed further editorial revisions.

Visual effects were created by a combination of freelance artists and visual effects studios, including Foxtrot X-ray.

Sound design was led by Studio Unknown. Additional sound work was carried out by Charles Bunce, Brian Hanson, and Kelby Thwaits, who collaborated with Studio Unknown while utilizing the sound stages and post-production facilities at the Mount Saint Mary's University film program.

== Reception and interpretations ==
Austin Film Festival
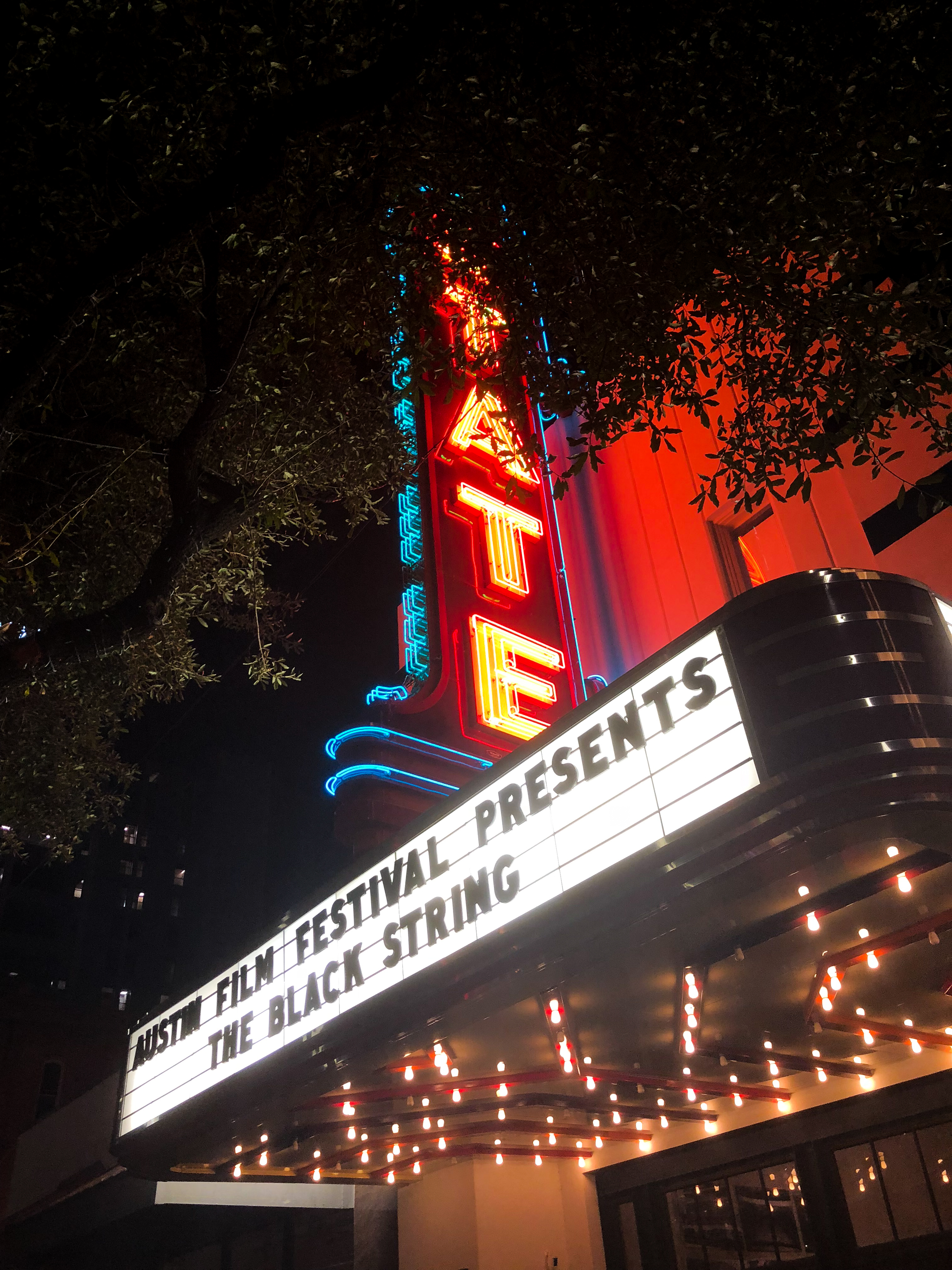
- U.S. Premiere of The Black String at the Austin Film Festival 2018

The Black String received generally positive reviews from critics and audiences, with particular attention given to its ambiguity and psychological themes. The film was screened at multiple film festivals and received several awards. It prompted multiple interpretations regarding the protagonist Jonathan’s condition, leaving viewers to consider whether he is experiencing a mental health crisis or has been subjected to a supernatural curse.

The film has drawn comparisons to works such as It Follows (2014) by David Robert Mitchell, Jacob's Ladder (1990) by Adrian Lyne, Contracted (2013) by Eric England, Shivers (1975) by David Cronenberg, and Rosemary's Baby (1968) by Roman Polanski, among others. Film critic Phil Wheat noted the body horror aspects of the film, describing them as “a mix of the work of David Cronenberg and the mythos of H. P. Lovecraft.”

On the review aggregator website Rotten Tomatoes, The Black String holds an approval rating of 86%, based on 7 reviews, with an average rating of 6.6/10.

Richard Whittaker of The Austin Chronicle wrote that “much of the unnerving energy depends on Muniz, who deploys his trademark brand of wired and wiry energy to keep the reality of the insanity ambiguous until the closing moments.” Brittany Witherspoon of Film Threat praised Muniz’s performance, stating, “Elevating this script from a derivative and simple one is no easy task, but Muniz does it effortlessly.”

== Soundtrack ==
The film's soundtrack was composed by Ed Lima and added upon by the band, Devilish Trio.

== Awards and accolades ==
Award	Category	Recipient	Result
Atlanta Horror Film Festival (2019)	Best Director	Brian Hanson	Won
Atlanta Horror Film Festival (2019)	Best Feature	Richard Handley, Brian Hanson, Black String Film, LLC	Won
Film Quest (2019)	Filmquest Cthulhu, Best Actor - Feature	Frankie Muniz	Won
GI Film Festival San Diego (2019)	Jury Prize, Best Actor (Feature)	Frankie Muniz	Won
Horrorhaus Film Festival (2019)	Audience Choice Award-Best Feature Film	The Black String	Won
Horrorhaus Film Festival (2019)	Best Produced Feature Screenplay	Richard Handley, Brian Hanson	Won
Horrorhaus Film Festival (2019)	Best Actor – Feature,	Frankie Muniz	Won
Horrorhaus Film Festival (2019)	Best Director-Feature	Brian Hanson, Richard Handley	Won
Horrorhaus Film Festival (2019)	Best Feature Film	The Black String	Won
New Orleans Horror Film Festival (2019)	Best Actor	Frankie Muniz	Won
Shriekfest (2019)	Best Thriller Feature	Richard Handley, Brian Hanson, Charles L. Bunce, Kayli Fortun, Sheldon Brigman, Sharif Ibrahim, Marisela Handley, Yani Navas, Shawn Loutsis, Stephen Purvis, Madison A. Stevens	Nominee

== Notable film festival selections ==
- GI Film Festival (2019) (San Diego, Premiere)
- Shriekfest (2019) (Los Angeles, California)
- Dances With Films (2019) (TLC Chinese Theaters, Hollywood, CA)
- Sitges Film Festival (2019) (Catalonia, Spain, specializing in fantasy and horror films)
- London Frightfest Film Festival (2019)(London premiere on the Cineworld IMAX auditorium screen at the Empire, Leicester Square)
- Austin Film Festival (2018) (U.S. Premiere, the historic State Theater, Austin, Texas)
