= Devil's Whisper =

- Directed by: Adam Ripp
- Written by: Adam Ripp; Oliver Robins; Paul Todisco
- Screenplay by: Oliver Robins; Paul Todisco
- Produced by: Adam Ripp; Manoj Punjabi; Mark Stolaroff; Brian Hanson (co-producer); Richard Handley (Associate Producer)
- Starring: Luca Oriel; Violkys Bustamante; Alison Fernandez; Marcos Ferraez; Rick Ravanello; Tessie Santiago
- Cinematography: Patrice Lucien Cochet
- Edited by: Carsten Kurpanek
- Music by: Penka Kouneva; Christopher Lord
- Production company: Vega Baby
- Distributed by: Sony Pictures Home Entertainment
- Release date: 19 October 2017
- Running time: 85 minutes
- Countries: United States; Indonesia
- Language: English

Devil's Whisper is an American-Indonesian 2017 supernatural horror film directed by Adam Ripp. Also a psychological thriller, it features demonic possession, repressed memories, childhood trauma and the cycle of abuse.

== Plot ==
15 year-old Alejandro Duran, who comes from a religious Latino family, aspires to one day be a Catholic priest. But when Alex discovers a mysterious box he unwittingly unleashes a demonic spirit bent on possessing him. Alex must find a way to defeat this ancient demon, which has been tormenting children since the dawn of man, before it destroys him and everyone he loves.

== Cast ==
- Luca Oriel as Alex
- Tessie Santiago as Lucia
- Alison Fernandez as Alicia
- Marcos A. Ferraez as Marcos
- Violkys Bustamante
- Benjamin A. Hoyt
- Luna Maya as Dr. Dian
- Julia Modesto
- Olivia Negron
- Jasper Polish as Lia
- Rick Ravanello as Father Cutler
- Steven Shaw
- Coy Stewart as Gavin
- Justin Tinucci as Everett
