= Standing Up =

- Theatrical release poster
- Directed by: D. J. Caruso
- Screenplay by: D. J. Caruso
- Based on: The Goats by Brock Cole
- Produced by: Geyer Kosinski; Alexander Rodnyansky; Ken Aguado
- Starring: Chandler Canterbury; Annalise Basso
- Cinematography: Alex Nepomniaschy
- Edited by: Josh Bodnar
- Music by: Brian Tyler
- Production companies: Aldamisa Entertainment; Media Talent Group; A.R. Films; Seven Star Pictures
- Distributed by: ARC Entertainment
- Release date: August 16, 2013
- Running time: 89 minutes
- Country: United States
- Language: English

Standing Up (also known as Goat Island) is a 2013 American coming-of-age film written and directed by D. J. Caruso and starring Chandler Canterbury and Annalise Basso. It was based on Brock Cole's 1987 young adult novel The Goats.

== Plot ==
Two children, Howie (Chandler Canterbury) and Grace (Annalise Basso), are stripped naked and left stranded together on an island as victims of a vicious summer camp prank. Rather than returning to camp to face the humiliation, they decide to take off on the run together. Grace does not know how to swim, so she holds onto a broken tree branch as Howie swims across the lake.

They are soon washed onto a shore near a cottage. Howie goes to the lake and spots three men headed toward the shore in a boat. He decides to take a camera and a notepad to keep track of everything they steal in order to return it to its rightful owner along with an explanation of why it was taken. They continue on their journey and encounter a group of teenagers partying and drinking near a beach. Howie grabs some money out of one of the trucks, much to Grace's disapproval. They take a break on a family beach where they purchase a hot dog and a bag of chips. They also devise a plan to steal some new clothes. As they are walking through town later that day, they spot one of their camp counselors handing out pictures of them to the locals as well as the police. They get on a bus that is rounding up a group of children for a different camp.

Their cover is almost blown when two girls Tiwana (Alexus Lapri Geier) and Lydia (Deidra Shores) confront them about taking their seats; however, Calvin (Adrian Kali Turner) convinces the girls to take other seats. Once they arrive at the camp, Howie and Grace attempt to run away, but Calvin and Tiwana catch them and convince them to spend the night at camp. Tiwana and Calvin befriend and defend Howie and Grace during their time at camp, and Howie defends Grace from a boy who forcibly kisses her at a dance. Tiwana makes Grace promise to call her mother (Radha Mitchell).

The next night, Howie and Grace manipulate their way into a hotel room, where they get to know each other a little more and they formally introduce each other when they realize that they never did. The following day, they decide to hitchhike their way back to camp. Unfortunately, they encounter shady sheriff's deputy Perry Hofstadder (Val Kilmer) who lies to them and locks them in his truck. When he gets out to make a phone call, the children try to drive away. They go in the wrong direction and are forced to jump off a cliff into a lake. Grace again calls her mother who reveals the truth about Howie, saying that he's in foster care and they later get disconnected. After the phone call, Grace tells Howie that he could stay with her but he doesn't believe her and he tells her that he doesn't need her and they get into a fight. Howie confesses to her that he wanted them to live together in the woods like Indians and Grace suggests that they can head downriver and that he teaches her how to swim and she thanks him for everything and they hug. Grace's mom arrives at a honey stand that the kids were at with a police officer and the owner tells her they headed up the road, where she and Grace reunite as Howie watches in the distance.

Later that fall, Howie gets adopted by a family in Connecticut and sends Grace a package containing a letter, a list of what they took from the cottage along with how much money they owe the owners, and pictures of their time together. They still keep in touch, and see each other the next summer to see cut out people at a museum and go to NASA instead of going back to camp.

== Cast ==
- Annalise Basso as Shadow "Grace" Golden
- Chandler Canterbury as Howie
- Radha Mitchell as Meg Golden, Grace's mom
- Val Kilmer as Deputy Sheriff Hofstadder
- Blake Cooper Griffin as Eric
- Kate Maberly as Margo
- Justin Tinucci as Butch

== Production ==
A long-time passion project for DJ Caruso and Ken Aguado, who had both read the acclaimed novel in the early 1990s, Caruso began adapting the novel in 2000 when he and Aguado became partners in Humble Journey Films. It took another 12 years for Aguado and Caruso to find the funding the get the film produced. Made for $4 million, the film was given a limited theatrical release in August 2013.

=== Music ===
The score for the film was composed by Brian Tyler, which marks his third collaboration with Caruso, following 2008's action thriller Eagle Eye. The soundtrack was released on September 24, 2013, by Varèse Sarabande.

Track listing
No.	Title	Length
1.	"Standing Up Main Theme"	4:15
2.	"Grace"	1:18
3.	"High Jinx"	1:56
4.	"Forever and Back"	2:57
5.	"Adventure Through the Woods"	2:33
6.	"Momentum"	4:07
7.	"Sunrise"	3:04
8.	"Motel Sell"	2:57
9.	"Connection"	1:54
10.	"Affirmations"	3:46
11.	"Adrift in Memory"	1:57
12.	"The Getaway"	1:54
13.	"We've Gotta Go"	2:21
14.	"Howie's Secret"	2:45
15.	"Officer Not So Friendly"	2:35
16.	"Empathy"	2:29
17.	"Finale"	5:15
18.	"End Titles"	1:57
Total length:		45:60

== Reception ==
Rotten Tomatoes, a review aggregator, reports that 56% of nine surveyed critics gave the film a positive review; the average rating is 5.8/10. On, Metacritic, it has a score of 40/100 based on five reviews. Writing for the Los Angeles Times, Annlee Ellingson called it a "sanitized version of The Goats" that lacks humor or risk-taking. Writing for entertainment trade publication Daily Variety, Peter Debruge said, "...this low-budget passion project... offers a practical solution to the issue of adolescent bullying, as its two young protags respond to a case of vicious hazing not with despair or retaliation, but through teamwork and character-building."

== Accolades ==
Year	Award	Category	Recipient(s)	Result
2014	Young Artist Award	Best Leading Young Actor in a Feature Film	Chandler Canterbury	Nominated
2014	Young Artist Award	Best Leading Young Actress in a Feature Film	Annalise Basso	Nominated
2014	Young Artist Award	Best Supporting Young Actor in a Feature Film	Justin Tinucci	Nominated
