= Lady Dynamite =

American comedy television series

- Genre: Comedy; Surrealism
- Created by: Pam Brady; Mitch Hurwitz
- Starring: Maria Bamford; Fred Melamed; Mary Kay Place; Ólafur Darri Ólafsson
- Composer: David Schwartz
- Country of origin: United States
- Original language: English
- No. of seasons: 2
- No. of episodes: 20

Production
- Executive producers: Maria Bamford; Mitch Hurwitz; Pam Brady; Kristen Zolner; Andy Weil; Jane Wiseman
- Camera setup: Single-camera
- Running time: 26–35 minutes
- Production companies: Wounded Poodle; The Hurwitz Company

Original release
- Network: Netflix
- Release: May 20, 2016 – November 10, 2017

Lady Dynamite is an American comedy television series starring Maria Bamford, and is loosely based on her life. It was created by Pam Brady and Mitch Hurwitz, on Netflix. The twelve-episode first season was released in its entirety on May 20, 2016. The series was renewed for a second season on July 27, 2016. The second season premiered on November 10, 2017. On January 13, 2018, the series was canceled after two seasons.

== Premise ==
Stand-up comedian/actor Maria Bamford (portrayed by herself) moves back to Los Angeles after spending six months away in recovery for bipolar disorder and attempts to build up her life from scratch with the help of her agent Bruce Ben-Bacharach (Fred Melamed). Throughout the entire first season, flashbacks are employed to gain an insight on Maria's backstory and her relationships with her family and friends.

== Cast ==
=== Main ===
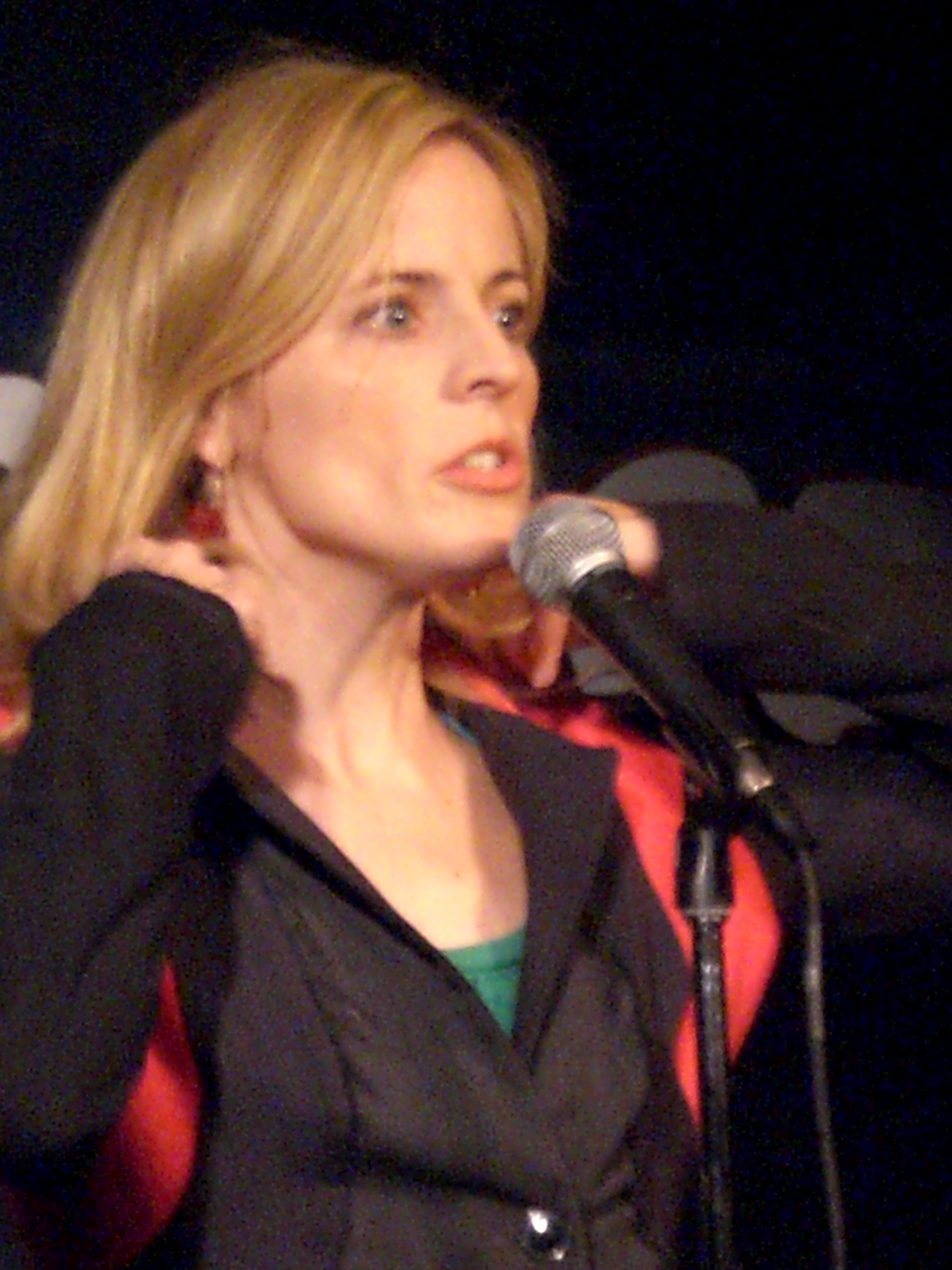
Maria Bamford, star of the show

- Maria Bamford as Maria Bamford, a fictionalized version of herself
  - Bamford also provides the voice of Blueberry, Scott's dog
- Fred Melamed as Bruce Ben-Bacharach, Maria's manager
- Mary Kay Place as Marilyn Bamford, Maria's mother
- Ólafur Darri Ólafsson as Scott, Maria's boyfriend (season 2, recurring season 1)

=== Recurring ===
- Ana Gasteyer as Karen Grisham, Maria's agent
- Ed Begley Jr. with Kurt Braunohler (season 2, flashbacks) as Joel Bamford, Maria's father
- Lennon Parham as Larissa, Maria's friend
- Bridget Everett as Dagmar, Maria's friend
- Mo Collins as Susan Beeber, Maria's childhood friend
- Dean Cain as Graham, Maria's ex-fiancé
- June Diane Raphael as Karen Grisham, Maria's realtor
- Jenny Slate as Karen Grisham, Maria's life coach
- Kenny and Keith Lucas as themselves
- Yimmy Yim as Chantrelle, Bruce's assistant
- Kyle McCulloch and Piotr Michael as the voice of Bert, Maria's dog

=== Guest stars ===
- Stephnie Weir
- Sarah Silverman
- Tig Notaro
- Adam Pally
- Patton Oswalt
- Brian Posehn
- David Spade
- Jackie Kashian
- Esther Povitsky
- John Mulaney
- John Ridley
- Mark McGrath
- Mira Sorvino
- Brandon Routh
- Wendie Malick
- Missi Pyle
- Seth Meyers
- Judd Apatow
- Annie Mumolo
- Joanna Cassidy
- Kerri Kenney
- Gabriel Hogan
- Jason Mantzoukas
- Jon Cryer
- Paul Scheer
- Justin Tinucci
- Adrian Zmed
- Andy Samberg
- Judy Greer
- Joey Soloway
- "Weird Al" Yankovic
- Melanie Hutsell

== Background ==
=== Concept and development ===
What I hope people get from [the show] is that by losing everything, it's possible to become something better. At least in real life, I have a much more reasonably paced life than I ever had when I was slightly banana head. In losing some of my ambition, it made it so I can have relationships and a better life. That has been learned throughout the ages: You mean money and prestige doesn't make people happy? Nope.

— Bamford explaining the series for Vulture.com

The show came to be when Mitch Hurwitz approached Maria Bamford and asked her if she had an idea for a series, reportedly in 2013. Part of the pitch was telling a story about a mental breakdown. The project was no more than talks for years. Later, Hurwitz attached Pam Brady to the project to write and direct. Bamford described this process as "extremely slow".

The use of nonlinear narrative in the show was part of Bamford's pitch. It is used to portray the different mental states people can go through, and also how they overcome it. In that way, the show's flashbacks serve as "a reminder of that journey." Bamford describes the show's narrative structure as "Bloodline, with me."

Bamford, who is a stand-up comedian, decided not to use stand-up comedy as a device in her show. When asked about her decision, she explained: "Even though that is a reasonable way of telling the story, I do have a self-conscious feeling of "I don't want to see the same thing over and over"". This decision is depicted in the pilot episode of the series.

=== Writing ===
Maria Bamford was involved in the writing process, but she did not write any episode herself. In spite of the show being based on Bamford's real life, the writers had freedom to modify her experiences for creative purposes. For example, in the pilot episode, Maria puts a bench in front of her house in an effort to promote a sense of community in her neighborhood. This idea came from Bamford's real life.

Even though she did not take a hands-on approach in the writing of the series, she was in the writers' room often, to discuss ideas and "hang out" with the writers. Writing credits include Kyle McCulloch, former South Park writer, and Jen Statsky, former Parks and Recreation and Late Night with Jimmy Fallon writer.

=== Directing ===
Former Arrested Development collaborators Max Winkler and Andrew Fleming directed episodes for Lady Dynamite. Robert Cohen, Academy award-winner Jessica Yu and Ryan McFaul also directed episodes.

== Episodes ==
=== Series overview ===
Season	Episodes	Originally released
1	12	May 20, 2016
2	8	November 10, 2017

=== Season 1 (2016) ===
No. overall	No. in season	Title	Directed by	Written by	Original release date
1	1	"Pilot"	Mitchell Hurwitz	Pam Brady & Mitchell Hurwitz	May 20, 2016
Maria installs a "community" park bench in front of her place in order to get to know her neighbors better. She goes into some of her past including her time at a mental health institution and when she was a teenager. She befriends popular talent agent Karen Grisham, who wants to be besties with her but does not take her on as a client. Although reluctant to do stand-up work, Maria is convinced by her manager Bruce Ben-Bacharach to join a benefit event called Open Arms with Sugar Ray's Mark McGrath, but then learns it is more about carrying firearms in the open rather than embracing people. Patton Oswalt plays a cop who disapproves of Maria's park bench, but he breaks character to advise her not to do the cliche stand-up motif in sitcoms. Guest appearances: Patton Oswalt, Mark McGrath, John Mulaney, Brian Posehn, Jon Cryer, Stephnie Weir, Nicole Byer
2	2	"Bisexual Because of Meth"	Andrew Fleming	Theresa Mulligan Rosenthal	May 20, 2016
Maria is fired from the sitcom Baby on Board for speaking her mind, but Bruce convinces the director to continue to work the rest of the day. Maria agrees to have Karen be her agent. She goes on a date with a recovering meth addict. Guest appearance: Josh Casaubon
3	3	"White Trash"	Daniel Gray Longino	Kyle McCulloch	May 20, 2016
Worried she may be an unwitting racist, Maria seeks out a support group and fights for a big change on the set of a sitcom pilot starring the Lucas Brothers and Mira Sorvino. Guest appearances: Mira Sorvino, Lucas Brothers, John Ridley
4	4	"Jack and Diane"	Bill Benz	Matt Ross & Max Searle	May 20, 2016
When Maria slips into a sultry voice at a party, a handsome stranger (Brandon Routh) falls under her spell—and brings out her worst people-pleaser tendencies. Guest appearances: Brandon Routh, Joanna Cassidy, Patton Oswalt, Lucas Brothers
5	5	"I Love You"	Robert Cohen	Jen Statsky	May 20, 2016
Maria struggles to keep up with a sporty new beau. But before she can break it off, the relationship takes a startling turn. Guest appearances: Dean Cain, Adam Pally, Carter MacIntyre
6	6	"Loaf Coach"	Andrew Fleming	Theresa Mulligan Rosenthal	May 20, 2016
After a long history of over-committing, Maria hires a "loaf coach" to help her master the art of doing nothing. But her timing couldn't be worse as she receives an audition for a Judd Apatow film. Guest appearances: Judd Apatow, Sarah Silverman, Jason Mantzoukas, Tig Notaro, Patton Oswalt, Betsy Sodaro, Esther Povitsky, Lucas Brothers
7	7	"Josue"	Max Winkler	Kyle McCulloch	May 20, 2016
Maria brings on a savvy young adviser to help her conquer her fear of children before a charity benefit. Guest appearances: Gilberto Ortiz, Joe Nunez, Sky Elobar, Mo Collins
8	8	"A Vaginismus Miracle"	Robert Cohen	Jen Statsky	May 20, 2016
Maria's first audition in months leads to fireworks on the Fox lot. Later, she races to have sex before her annual deadline. Guest appearances: Missi Pyle, Andy Daly, Adrian Zmed, James R. Black, Melanie Hutsell
9	9	"No Friend Left Behind"	Ben Berman	Theresa Mulligan Rosenthal	May 20, 2016
Fearing she's ruined all her relationships, Maria seeks out a bitter former friend and vows to win her back by any means necessary. Guest appearance: Annie Mumolo
10	10	"Knife Feelings"	Ryan McFaul	Matt Ross & Max Searle	May 20, 2016
Maria braves a romantic hurdle by inviting Scott to her tell-all stand-up show. But she doesn't count on him having some dark secrets of his own. Guest appearances: Wendie Malick, Adrian Zmed
11	11	"Mein Ramp"	Jessica Yu	Pam Brady	May 20, 2016
Maria is mortified to learn she's trending on YouTube for being the face of a child soldier army. In a flashback, she faces a difficult choice: her meds or her career. Guest appearances: Kerri Kenney, Seth Meyers, James Corden, Seth Morris, Lucas Brothers, Justin Tinucci
12	12	"Enter the Super Grisham"	Max Winkler	Pam Brady	May 20, 2016
While Scott tries to figure out what went wrong, Maria throws herself into her work. In the past, a Checklist gig finally pushes her over the edge. Guest appearances: Mark McGrath, Gabriel Hogan, Betsy Sodaro, Charlie Finn

=== Season 2 (2017) ===
No. overall	No. in season	Title	Directed by	Written by	Original release date
13	1	"Wet Raccoon"	Ryan McFaul	Pam Brady	November 10, 2017
After Scott moves in with Maria, they have to deal with their idiosyncrasies, including a raccoon that Maria keeps feeding. One year in the future, Maria is back with Karen Grisham as her agent and pitches a new streaming series. In 1987 Duluth, sixteen-year-old Maria unwillingly goes with her father to a model train convention.
14	2	"Hypnopup"	Ryan McFaul	Theresa Mulligan Rosenthal	November 10, 2017
In a panic over an unpaid bill, Maria drags Scott to a Debtors Anonymous meeting. But their money problems are just beginning.
15	3	"Goof Around Gang"	Anna Dokoza	Kyle McCulloch	November 10, 2017
Scott's foray into stand-up yields unexpected results. Meanwhile, Maria realizes she's been neglecting her friends.
16	4	"Fridge Over Troubled Daughter"	Robert Cohen	Robert Cohen	November 10, 2017
A surprise visit from Maria's mother gets off to a rocky start when she insists on psychoanalyzing Scott.
17	5	"Souplutions"	Ryan McFaul	Hallie Cantor	November 10, 2017
While tending to her sick beau, Maria tries to show off her nurturing side. But Scott's best friend, Jessica, seems to do everything better.
18	6	"Apache Justice"	Ryan McFaul	Matteo Borghese & Rob Turbovsky	November 10, 2017
Twisted up in knots over an argument with her mom, Maria seeks refuge on the set of a Western TV drama. Future Bruce scores a big new client.
19	7	"Kids Have to Dance"	Ben Berman	Kyle McCulloch & Robert Cohen	November 10, 2017
Maria discovers she's being sued over a sadistic reality show in the Philippines and turns to David Spade for help.
20	8	"Little Manila"	Pam Brady	Theresa Mulligan Rosenthal & Pam Brady	November 10, 2017
When the plans for Maria's second wedding hit a snag, her new friends in the Filipino community step in to throw her an unforgettable party.

== Reception ==
Critical response of Lady Dynamite
Season	Rotten Tomatoes	Metacritic
1	94% (35 reviews)	85% (15 reviews)
2	100% (15 reviews)	85% (15 reviews)

The first season of Lady Dynamite has received widespread acclaim from critics. On Rotten Tomatoes, it has a rating of 94%, based on 31 reviews, with an average rating of 8.2/10. The site's critical consensus reads, "Maria Bamford's Lady Dynamite is a vibrant, subversive, sweet, meta-fictional ride - but also a courageous, boundary-busting and ultimately deep portrayal of a troubled psyche." On Metacritic, the season has a score of 85 out of 100, based on 15 reviews, indicating "universal acclaim". The show has garnered attention because of its depiction of mental illness.

The New York Times described the show as "[having] its own bizarre-sincere voice and its own dream logic" and "something else, in a good way: a journey to the center of Ms. Bamford's mind that dives through fantasy after loopy fantasy and emerges with something real." About the show's style, The New York Times noted that "The show's creators, Pam Brady (South Park) and Mitch Hurwitz (Arrested Development), have constructed a multipurpose fun house; we jump about in time and flit from meta-show to memoir to hallucination."

Variety described Bamford's performance saying that "the actress and comedian, whose presence has rarely been used as well as it is here, manages the neat trick of being both believably guileless and winningly sharp." Variety also praised the show's guest stars, stating: "the entire show gains a great deal of energy from a varied array of game guest actors, including Mira Sorvino, Patton Oswalt, Ana Gasteyer, Brandon Routh, and Bridget Everett, all of whom appear delighted to be in Bamford's playfully serious orbit."

On Rotten Tomatoes, the second season holds a 100% approval rating based on 16 reviews. The site's critical consensus reads, "Lady Dynamite's meta humor escalates in a sophomore season that doubles down on the series' freewheeling sensibility, with Maria Bamford's deeply felt performance providing a mesmerizing center amid the stylistic chaos."

Critics have compared the series to Unbreakable Kimmy Schmidt, Community, Review and BoJack Horseman because of the way it uses meta-humor, absurdist humor and how it deals with mental health.

=== Accolades ===
Award	Category	Recipient(s)	Result	Ref.
21st Satellite Awards	Best Musical or Comedy Series		Nominated	
2016 IGN Awards	Best New Series		Nominated	

== See also ==
- Portlandia (TV series), which featured a Lady Dynamite cameo at the end of season seven
