= Annalise Basso =

American actress (born 1998)

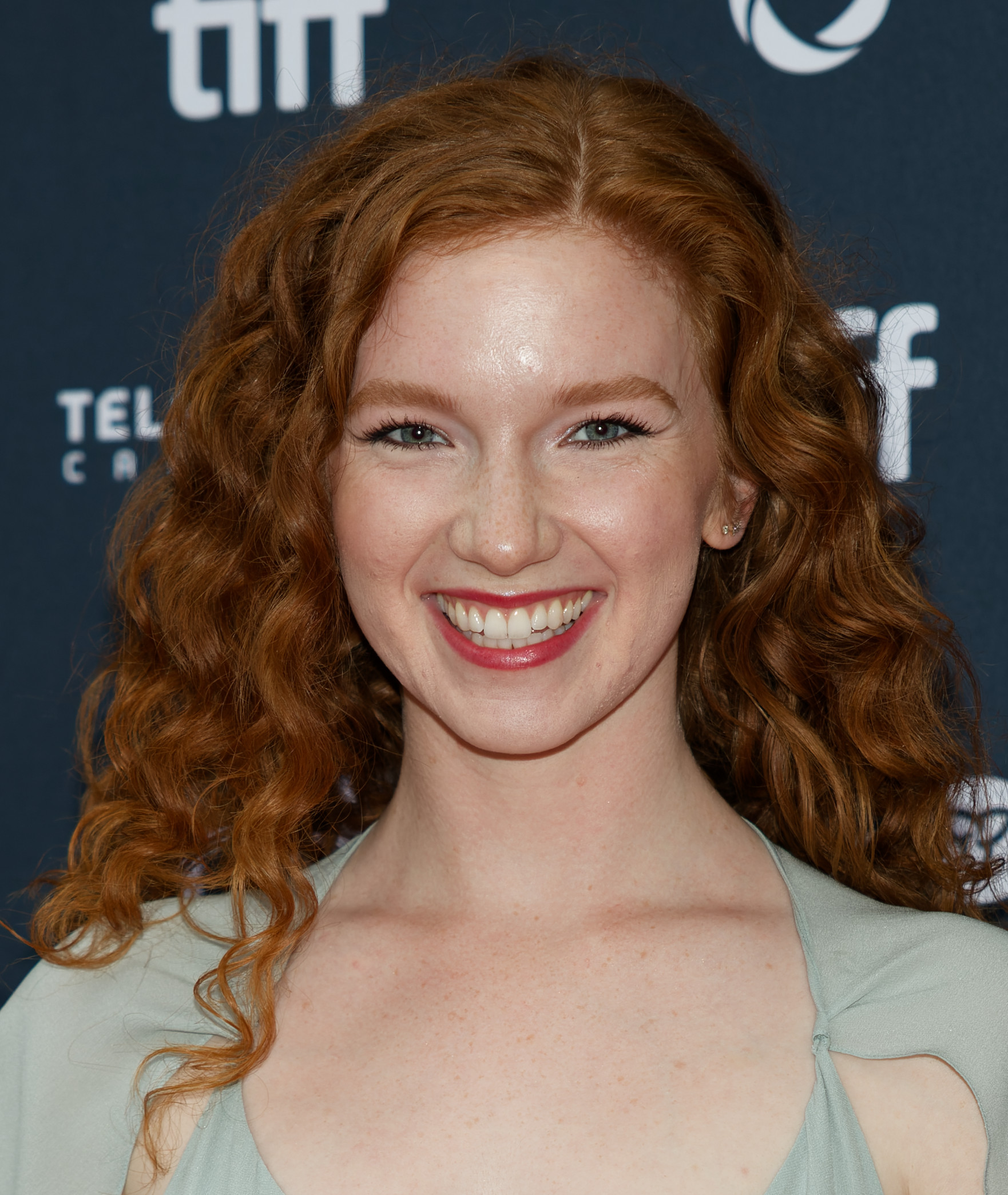
- Basso in 2024
- Born: December 2, 1998 (age 27)
- Occupations: Actress; model
- Years active: 2007–present

Annalise Basso (born December 2, 1998) is an American actress and model. She is best known for her role as LJ Folger in the post-apocalyptic dystopian thriller series Snowpiercer (2020–2022). She started her career as a child actress, appearing in the films Bedtime Stories (2008), Love Takes Wing (2009), Standing Up (2013) and Oculus (2013). From 2014 until 2015, she starred in the television series The Red Road.

== Career ==
Most of her initial roles have been on television commercials or small guest appearances on television series. Her first role that garnered attention was her role as Eden Hamby on True Blood. In 2009, she starred in the television film Love Takes Wing from the Love Comes Softly series. When she was 10, she took part in Are You Smarter Than a 5th Grader? as a student. More recently, she has had roles in episodes of New Girl and Nikita.

Basso's first lead role in a feature film was in D. J. Caruso's Standing Up, a coming-of-age story based on the novel The Goats by Brock Cole. The film debuted at the 2012 Cannes Film Festival. The story centers on two children, played by Basso and Chandler Canterbury, who are stripped naked and left stranded together on an island as part of a summercamp prank.

In 2014, she starred in the horror film Oculus as a younger version of Karen Gillan's character. Basso gained greater recognition and attention for the critically successful horror film Ouija: Origin of Evil in 2016.

In 2017, she played Angela in the James Franco-produced Camp, released in 2024.

In 2019, she played Heaven Casteel in series of Lifetime movies based on the Casteel saga by V.C. Andrews.

She starred as LJ Folger in TNT's apocalyptic thriller Snowpiercer, adapted from the movie of the same name.

In 2025, Basso starred and produced the Lifetime film Vanished Out of Sight (AKA Blind River) where she portrayed the blind woman Claire Moyer.

== Filmography ==
=== Film ===
Year	Title	Role	Notes
2007	Ghost Image	Susan Zellan	
2008	Bedtime Stories	Tricia Sparks	
2009	Dark House	Red Headed Girl	
2009	Alabama Moon	Cousin Alice	Uncredited
2013	Standing Up	Shadow "Grace" Golden	
2013	Oculus	Young Kaylie Russell	
2016	Captain Fantastic	Vespyr Cash	
2016	Ouija: Origin of Evil	Paulina "Lina" Zander	
2017	The Good Time Girls	Ellie	Short film
2018	Nostalgia	Tallie Beam	
2018	Slender Man	Katie Jensen	
2018	Ladyworld	Piper	
2020	The Bloodhound	Vivian	
2023	A Creature Was Stirring	Charm	
2024	Camp	Angela	
2024	The Life of Chuck	Janice Halliday	

=== Television ===
Year	Title	Role	Notes
2008	Desperate Housewives	Denise	Episode: "Me and My Town"
2009	Love Takes Wing	Lillian	Television film
2009	Lie to Me	Maggie Ambrose	Episode: "Better Half"
2009	True Blood	Eden Hamby	Episode: "Keep This Party Going"
2009	Three Rivers	Mary	Episode: "The Luckiest Man"
2009	Are You Smarter Than a 5th Grader?	Student	Main role (season 1)
2010	Childrens Hospital	Morgan	Episode: "I See Her Face Everywhere"
2011	Bones	Amber Tremblay	Episode: "The Change in the Game"
2011	Parks and Recreation	Abigail	Episode: "Pawnee Rangers"
2012	New Girl	Sarah Shiller	Episode: "Kids"
2012	Nikita	Liza Abbott	Episode: "Innocence"
2014	The Red Road	Kate Jensen	Main role
2015	Constantine	Vesta Whitney	Episode: "Waiting for the Man"
2018	Electric Dreams	Foster Lee	Episode: "Safe & Sound"
2019	Heaven	Heaven Casteel	Television film
2019	Dark Angel	Heaven Casteel	Television film
2019	Fallen Hearts	Heaven Casteel	Television film
2020–2022	Snowpiercer	LJ Folger	Main role
2025	Blind River	Claire Moyer	Television film; also producer
2026	Margo's Got Money Troubles	Kathryn	2 episodes
2026	Carrie	Student Caller #2	Episode: "First Period"

=== Web series ===
Year	Title	Role	Notes
2016	Cold	Isla Wallis	

=== Music videos ===
Year	Song	Artist	V
2015	"Outcast"	Mainland	

== Accolades ==
Year	Award	Category	Work	Result	Ref(s)
2014	Young Artist Award	Best Leading Young Actress in a Feature Film	Standing Up	Nominated	
