= Marcos Ferraez =

American actor

Marcos A. Ferraez
- Born: Marcos Antonio Humberto Ferraez IV; October 27, 1966 (age 59); United States
- Other name: Marcos De La Cruz
- Occupations: Actor, writer, director
- Years active: 1994-present
- Spouse: Alona Tal (m. 2005)
- Children: 2

Marcos Antonio Humberto Ferraez IV (born October 27, 1966) is an American actor best known for his work on the mid-1990s television drama, Pacific Blue.

He played Ground Rush in the 2000 movie Cutaway. He also appeared on the television series The Shield (2003, 2004) and Sons of Anarchy (2008, 2010).

== Personal life ==
Ferraez was born in the United States, and grew up in Mexico, before returning to the United States.

Ferraez married Israeli actress Alona Tal on March 23, 2005. The couple have two daughters, born in March 2017 and September 2022.

== Filmography ==
Film
Year	Title	Role	Notes
1993	Rave, Dancing to a Different Beat	Ranks	
1995	Coldblooded	Man with Uzi	
2001	Beyond the City Limits	Det. Lomax	
2002	Greenmail	Simpson	Video
2009	My Sister's Keeper	EMT	
2009	American Cowslip	Johnny Eyelash	
2009	Reflections	Human 1	Short film
2011	Fxxxen Americans	Angus Gunn	Short film
2012	Atonal	Alex / Young Emil	Short film
2012	Past God	Meyer	Completed
2012	Johnny Christ	Brady Ramond	Post-production
2013	37	Mark	Post-production

Television
Year	Title	Role	Notes
1994	Search and Rescue		TV movie
1995	Sketch Artist II: Hands That See	Mayberry	TV movie
1995	Dead Weekend	Gonzolo	TV movie
1996-1999	Pacific Blue	Victor Del Toro	58 episodes
2000	Resurrection Blvd.	Vinnie Peralta	Episode: "Mascaras"
2000	Cutaway	Ground Rush	TV movie
2003	The Shield	Leith	Episode: "Barnstormers"
2004	The Shield	Leith	Episode: "All In"
2005	Hollywood Vice	Frank Mudgett	TV movie
2007	Marlowe	Zack Battis	TV movie
2008-2010	Sons of Anarchy	Agent Estevez	11 episodes (Note: Credited as Marcos de la Cruz)
2010	CSI: NY	Manny Ravrara	Episode: "Damned If You Do"
2010	Law & Order: LA	Antonio Santiago	Episode: "Pasadena"
2012	The Mentalist	Manny Barca	Episode: "Cheap Burgundy"
2012	Burn Notice	Thorn	Episode: "6.15"
2013	NCIS: Los Angeles	Brady Salles	Episode: 5.3 "Omni"
2014	Criminal Minds	Det. Jimmy Tavez	Episode: "Fatal" (Note: Credited as Marcos de la Cruz)
