= Skydiving (magazine) =

Former Magazine for sport parachuting

Skydiving was an independent, monthly news magazine covering the events, equipment, techniques, people and places of sport parachuting. It was based in DeLand, Florida, and was launched in 1979. The magazine founder was Mike Truffer. Skydiving ceased publication in 2009.
