= David Anspaugh =

American television and film director

- Born: September 24, 1946 (age 79); Decatur, Indiana, U.S.
- Occupations: Film director, producer
- Notable work: Hoosiers; Rudy
- Spouses: Tamara Kramer (m. 1974; div. 1988); Roma Downey (m. 1995; div. 1998)
- Children: 2

David Anspaugh (born September 24, 1946) is an American television and film director.

== Professional career ==
After earning a bachelor's degree from Indiana University Bloomington, Anspaugh moved to Aspen, Colorado, where he worked as a substitute teacher and ski instructor for several years.

Anspaugh then enrolled in the University of Southern California (USC) School of Cinematic Arts. His work as an associate producer on television films led to his producing and directing Hill Street Blues. He followed this with directing St. Elsewhere and Miami Vice.

Anspaugh's feature film directing debut was Hoosiers, a nostalgic sports drama about a small-town team winning the Indiana state basketball title in 1952. The film was nominated for two Academy Awards. It was named best sports film of all time by USA Today in 2015 and by ESPN's expert panel and website users in 2005. Hoosiers also was named to the Library of Congress' National Film Registry.

Anspaugh's other feature-film directing credits include Fresh Horses, Rudy, Moonlight and Valentino, WiseGirls, The Game of Their Lives, and Little Red Wagon. He also has directed several TV movies.

In spring 2015, Anspaugh taught a class at Indiana University in directing for film and TV. In 2015 and 2017, he directed plays for the Bloomington Playwrights Project. Anspaugh made his acting debut in the 2019 BPP production of To Quiet the Quiet, which he also directed. In 2017, he directed the musical Spring Awakening at Ivy Tech Bloomington.

== Personal life ==
Anspaugh was born in Decatur, Indiana, to Lawrence (a portrait photographer) and Marie Anspaugh. He has a younger sister, Jane.

He was married from 1974 to 1988 to cruise line sales manager Tamara Kramer. They have a daughter, Vanessa. Anspaugh married Touched by an Angel actress Roma Downey on November 24, 1995. The couple had a daughter, Reilly Marie, on June 3, 1996.

In 1997, Anspaugh was diagnosed as clinically depressed and was treated at a rehabilitation clinic. The condition ultimately led to a breakdown of his marriage. Downey filed for divorce in March 1998; it was finalized later that year.

After living in California for four decades, in June 2014 Anspaugh relocated to Bloomington, Indiana.

== Awards ==
Anspaugh received two Primetime Emmy Awards for producing Hill Street Blues and a Directors Guild of America Award for directing Hill Street Blues.

On the night of the world premiere of Hoosiers in 1986, Anspaugh was named a Sagamore of the Wabash. This is Indiana's highest civilian honor, given to those who have rendered distinguished service to the state or governor. He was awarded Indiana's Governor's Arts Award in 1991. In 1996 he received Indiana University's Thomas Hart Benton Mural Medallion for Distinguished Achievement. The Indiana Historical Society named Anspaugh an Indiana Living Legend in 2011. In 2013 Anspaugh was inducted into the Indiana Basketball Hall of Fame. He also received the Hall's Silver Medal Award, given in recognition of contributions to Indiana high school basketball by someone other than a high school player or coach.
