= Norman A. Kent =

American aerial cinematographer and skydiver

Norman Kent
- Born: August 23, 1956 (age 69); El Paso, Texas, United States
- Known for: Skydiver, Photographer,

Norman Albert Kent (born August 23, 1956) is an aerial cinematographer and skydiver best known for his aerial videography in films such as Cutaway, Drop Zone and Terminal Velocity.

== Childhood ==
Born in El Paso, Texas, Kent grew up in Mexico City. His interest in photography developed as a young teenager after an excursion into the Mexican jungle when he was so taken with the beauty of the experience he wanted a way to share it.

== Aerial photography ==
When nineteen, Kent made his first parachute jump and found skydiving to be an opportunity to fulfil his passions for both adventure and photography. While still relatively inexperienced Kent had a photograph published as the centrefold of “Parachutist” Magazine which led to offers of commission to shoot for movies, television and various print media.

His first skydiving film was entitled Ride a Cloud, and Kent went on to make numerous films targeted at the skydiving fraternity, such as Kinisthesia, Wings, Willing to Fly, Flight of the Dream Team and From Wings came Flight.

Kent has been one of the official photographers verifying many skydiving world records in all parts of the globe.

Kent's notoriety for his aerial photography led to a demand for his services in Hollywood and he provided cinematography and coordinated aerial sequences in films such as Cliffhanger, Terminal Velocity, Eraser and Cutaway.

== Stunt work ==
Kent's skydiving expertise and connections in Hollywood have led to skydiving-related stunt work in numerous movies and TV shows. These include:

- Get Smart (film)
- Extreme Ops
- XXX
- Cutaway (2000 film)
- Drop Zone (film)
- Cliffhanger (film)

== Skydiving ==
Norman Kent has made over 35,000 skydives during a career spanning over 30 years.

Kent was awarded the USPA Gold Medal for Meritorious Achievement in 2006 in recognition of his "contributions to skydiving and the USPA".

Kent periodically offers aerial videography workshops. In addition to videography considerations such as lighting, backdrop, and composition, his classes also cover camera suits, canopy openings, and the special safety considerations unique to videography in freefall.

== Book ==
Kent published a book of skydiving photography in 1993 titled Norman Kent Photos.

== Recent work ==
Kent most recently served as director of photography and stunt coordinator for the skydiving unit for the action comedy Get Smart.
