= Little Red Wagon Foundation =

- Founded: 2005
- Founder: Zach Bonner

The Little Red Wagon Foundation is a non-profit charity that raises money and collects supplies for children in need. Founded in 2005 by Zach Bonner, the organization has raised thousands of dollars to build apartments for the needy.

== History ==
The Little Red Wagon Foundation was founded in 2005 by Zach Bonner and his mother when he was seven years old. He founded the organization to aid poverty-stricken children. Bonner said that, "These kids don't have a home, they don't have a safe place to sleep at night. They're out on the streets not because they want to be, but because it's out of their control."

Prior to establishing the organization, Bonner aided children during the aftermath of Hurricane Charley in 2004. Pulling his little red wagon, he went to neighboring households and collected 27 truckloads of disaster supplies, including tarps and water. He established the organization "[t]o continue helping kids more efficiently" and because federal law restricted how many donations he could receive. The organization was christened the "Little Red Wagon Foundation" because he was given this moniker by his neighbors when he was collecting donations.

== 2007 walk ==
In 2007, Zach Bonner walked 250 miles from Valrico, Tampa, Florida, to Tallahassee over a period of 23 days. His walk was inspired by a documentary about the Peace Pilgrim, a woman who walked 25,000 miles to advocate peace.

During the walk, Cracker Barrel donated 50 meals to Zach Bonner and his fellow walkers. At night, he; his sister, Kelley; and his mother, Laurie; slept in an RV. The RV would be parked in state parks, and every morning, Bonner and his fellow walkers would be transported by a car to the stopping point of the preceding day.

The walk ended at the Florida State Capitol, and raised $25,000.

== 2008 walk ==
In 2008, Zach Bonner went on a 270 mile walk from Tallahassee, Florida to Atlanta, Georgia. The walk raised over $7,000 to help pay for a Habitat for Humanity home for a homeless family in Macon, Georgia.

== 2009 walk ==
In 2009, Zach Bonner went on a walk from Atlanta, Georgia, to the White House to raise money to build apartments for the 1.3 million homeless children in the U.S. The trip had a projected cost of $6,000. Bonner said that he was going on the walk because "[t]hirteen kids on average die everyday for no other reason than the effects of being homeless. I walk for them. I walk to help give a voice to the kids that do not have one."

Every day, Bonner, his older sister, and his mother Laurie walked about 10 to 13 miles. After every couple of days of walking, Zach Bonner changed shoes. During the walk, the Bonners listened to their iPods when they are on backroads. When they were on busier roads, they did not because they had to "pay attention to the road and make sure [they] don't get run over". At night, Zach Bonner slept in an RV driven by his mother, while his sister slept in a Volkswagen Beetle.

The 668-mile, 59-day walk was completed on July 10. He met with Saxby Chambliss and spoke with several other U.S. Senators on Capitol Hill. He slept at the Sasha Bruce emergency shelter.

Bonner collected letters from children and at the end of his two-month trek, he gave the letters to President Barack Obama. When he reached Washington D.C., he received a $25,000 donation from Elton John. The money was used to renovate apartments for homeless children.

== 2010 walk ==
In 2010, Bonner walked from Tampa to Los Angeles. Calling the trip "March Across America", he began the 2,478-mile walk on March 23, 2010. The 2,478 mile trip took nearly six months to finish. At a speed of three miles per hour, Bonner walked five hours every day. He covered about an average of 17–22 miles every day. Throughout the walk, he visited homeless shelters to hold activities for the children who live there, such as having parties for them. Bonner's family walked with him during the trip. His mother, Laurie, was with him for the entire walk. His sister, Kelley, walked with him for six weeks, and his brother, Matt, walked the second half of the journey with him.

The Office Depot Foundation donated 2,478 backpacks to needy children, one for every mile Bonner walks. On September 14, 2010, Bonner completed the nearly 2,500-mile-walk to Los Angeles.

== Post-2010 ==
The foundation aims to start a resource center in Tampa, Florida so that children can receive food and clothes and use computers. During Bonner's 2010 March Across America project, he encountered Phoenix's Tumbleweed Center for the first time. Tumbleweed's outreach service for homeless youth impressed Bonner who planned to model his own resource center in Tampa after it.
