= Drop Zone (film) =

- Theatrical release poster
- Directed by: John Badham
- Screenplay by: Peter Barsocchini; John Bishop
- Story by: Tony Griffin; Guy Manos; Peter Barsocchini
- Produced by: D. J. Caruso; Wallis Nicita; Lauren Lloyd
- Starring: Wesley Snipes; Gary Busey; Yancy Butler; Michael Jeter
- Cinematography: Roy H. Wagner
- Edited by: Frank Morriss
- Music by: Hans Zimmer
- Production companies: Paramount Pictures; Nicita/Lloyd Productions
- Distributed by: Paramount Pictures
- Release date: December 9, 1994
- Running time: 101 minutes
- Country: United States
- Language: English
- Budget: $45 million
- Box office: $64 million

Drop Zone is a 1994 American action thriller film directed by John Badham, starring Wesley Snipes, Gary Busey, Yancy Butler, Michael Jeter, Sam Hennings, Luca Bercovici and Kyle Secor. The film follows U.S. Marshal Pete Nessip who has to take to the skies to break up a drug smuggling gang. Drop Zone was released by Paramount Pictures in the United States on December 9, 1994.

== Plot ==
Aboard a commercial Boeing 747 airliner, U.S. Marshals brothers Terry and Pete Nessip are escorting computer expert Earl Leedy to a high-security prison. When an apparent terrorist hijack attempt blows a hole in the airliner, Terry is sucked out of the plane, falling more than 30,000 ft (9,100 m) to his death. The perpetrators parachute out of the same hole, taking Leedy with them.

Ex-Drug Enforcement Administration (DEA) agent and renegade skydiver Ty Moncrief is the mastermind behind the attack, which culminated in the first-ever parachute jump from a commercial jet at 30,000 feet. Ty plans to use Leedy to hack into the DEA mainframe computer in Washington, D.C. so Ty can auction the names of undercover agents to drug cartels worldwide. Ty has scheduled this to be accomplished during an Independence Day parachute exhibition and fireworks display, which is the one day every year when security is loosened around the airspace above D.C.

Pete believes that the hijacking may have been an elaborate prison break meant to free Leedy. However, the FBI declares that sneaking a parachute through airport security is impossible, and that parachuting at the jet's altitude and speed is not survivable. A devastated Pete is blamed for overreacting to the incident, and he is forced to resign.

Undeterred, Pete consults Commander Dejaye, a US Navy high-altitude military parachuting instructor who confirms that he and his team have parachuted from that height and speed, but Dejaye also states that the high-density metal rings in the parachutes would not pass airport metal detectors and that the operation required either rare skills or suicidal recklessness. Dejaye believes the world class skydiver Don Jagger could perform the jump, but he does not know Jagger's whereabouts. Pete is instead referred to Jagger's reckless ex-girlfriend, ex-con Jessie Crossman, who runs a skydiving school in the Florida Keys. Jessie, who is unaware that Jagger is part of Ty's crew, agrees to train Pete how to skydive, if he will sponsor her team for the parachute exhibition.

Soon after, when Jagger's identity is exposed by a passenger from the hijacking, Jagger is found dead, tangled in some high voltage power lines. Jessie breaks into the police impound to examine Jagger's parachute. She determines that his death was a murder engineered by Ty, and she swears revenge. Pete inquires as to the parachute's lack of metal, which Jessie explains is a custom "smuggler's rig" made with high density fabrics to deter detection. When Pete discovers Ty's plan to hack into the DEA mainframe, the rest of the parachuting team agrees to help Pete with his objective. Jessie's parachuting friend Selkirk Power is severely injured after using a faulty parachute that Ty had intended for Jessie to use.

On the night of the Independence Day exhibition, Jessie sneaks into Ty's parachuting aircraft, holding them at gunpoint in order to determine an explanation for Jagger's death. Ty's men force her out of the aircraft and then exit themselves with parachutes. Jessie manages to grab ahold of the aircraft door bar. She releases her grasp and free falls just as Pete and the parachuting team arrive and rescue her, floating down safely to the roof of the DEA mainframe office building where Ty has already arrived.

Pete tries to find access to the DEA mainframe control room, eliminating Ty's men one by one, with the help of the parachuting team. He breaks in and holds Leedy (who has already started downloading the identities) as hostage. Ty kidnaps Jessie. He threatens to kill her unless Pete releases Leedy. Pete and Ty fight, which results in both of them falling out the building window. Pete opens his emergency parachute, but Ty tumbles to his death. Pete lands safely on the ground and is escorted away by paramedics. He spots Leedy wearing a DEA jacket, leaving the scene. A team member, Swoop, leaps from the building with a parachute, landing on Leedy and stopping him in his tracks. Pete tells Jessie jokingly that he would try skydiving again in 40 or 50 years.

== Cast ==
- Wesley Snipes as U.S. Marshal Pete Nessip
- Gary Busey as Ty Alan Moncrief
- Yancy Butler as Jessie Crossman
- Michael Jeter as Earl Leedy
- Corin Nemec as Selkirk "Selly" Power
- Kyle Secor as "Swoop"
- Luca Bercovici as Don Jagger
- Malcolm-Jamal Warner as U.S. Marshal Terry Nessip
- Rex Linn as Robby Walker
- Grace Zabriskie as Winona Santoro
- Robert LaSardo as "Deputy Dog"
- Sam Hennings as Torski
- Claire Stansfield as Kara Sellar
- Mickey Jones as "Deuce"
- Andy Romano as U.S. Marshals Deputy Director Tom McCracken
- Clark Johnson as Bob Covington
- Ed Amatrudo as Detective Fox
- Melanie Mayron as Mrs. Willins
- Al Israel as Schuster Stephens
- Steve Raulerson as Commander Dejaye
- Dale Swann as Captain
- Kimberly Scott as Joanne

== Production ==
The original idea came from two professional skydivers, Tony Griffin and Guy Manos. One of the film's screenwriters, Peter Barsocchini, would later write High School Musical. Steven Seagal was originally attached to star.

The insurance policies of Wesley Snipes and most of the cast precluded them from skydiving. However, Michael Jeter actually performed the tandem jump. The green Douglas C-47 Skytrain used in the skydiving scenes is currently on display at the Valiant Air Command air museum in Titusville, Florida. (Note: The Boeing 747-146, painted in "PAC Atlantic Pacific" livery was modified with a small "hole" added to the rear fuselage to simulate the hijacker's escape route while in-flight.)

== Music ==
The original music score was composed by Hans Zimmer. The score is one of Zimmer's favorites:

Drop Zone was written just for fun. I was being reckless—nothing to prove, nothing to lose. The director was just happy I was working with him. Remember, I come from rock n roll. At the same time, I grew up with classical music. So I'm always torn between the two. In Drop Zone, I could do both. And it never hurt! You know, with some scores, you come away with a lot of scars. In Drop Zone, there weren't any. It was just a blast.

== Release ==
=== Theatrical ===
Drop Zone was one of two skydiving action films released in 1994; the other was Terminal Velocity.

=== Home media ===
Drop Zone was released on Video CD in 1996. The Drop Zone DVD was released in Region 1 on May 25, 1999, and Region 2 on June 5, 2000. The home media versions were distributed by Paramount Home Entertainment.

== Reception ==
=== Box office ===
Drop Zone had a modest debut at the US box office and experienced a 52% drop in its second weekend. Drop Zone ultimately grossed $30 million in the US and Canada and $64 million worldwide against its $45 million budget.

=== Critical response ===
Drop Zone received a mixed reaction from reviewers. Film critic Lisa Schwarzbaum in Entertainment Weekly, said, "There's something deafening and reckless and hotdogging about Drop Zone, and I mean that as a compliment. This macho action fantasy from subculture specialist John Badham (Saturday Night Fever (1977), WarGames (1983)) is set in the daredevil society of sky divers, where Pete Nessip (Wesley Snipes), an unlikely federal marshal who is the last man around you'd expect to see pulling a rip cord, throws in with a band of professional plane leapers based in swampy Florida."

Roger Ebert gave this movie 2 1/2 stars, noted: "Drop Zone is one of those thrillers where the action is so interesting that you almost forgive (or even forget) the plot. The movie is virtually one stunt after another, many of them taking place in mid air, and during the pure action sequences you simply suspend your interest in the story and look at the amazing sights before you."

Film critic Chris Hicks saw one major problem, "As the film moves along, however, plotting becomes more and more illogical – and late in the film there are bits of business that remove the story so far from reality that audience goodwill is stretched to breaking point. Suspension of disbelief is one thing, but this film asks us to abandon it altogether."

The review in The Washington Post accentuated the positives before dissecting "a bad movie idea" and its predictable improbability. Drop Zone currently holds a 39% rating on Rotten Tomatoes based on 23 reviews. Audiences polled by CinemaScore gave the film an average grade of "B+" on an A+ to F scale.

=== Year-end lists ===
- Top 18 worst (alphabetically listed, not ranked) – Michael Mills, The Palm Beach Post
- Dishonorable mention – Glenn Lovell, San Jose Mercury News

== In popular culture ==
The Paramount Parks (now owned by Cedar Fair) featured drop tower amusement rides called Drop Zone: Stunt Tower, which were based on the film. The attractions are now named Drop Tower: Scream Zone.

The musical sting that plays when Swoop (Kyle Secor) races to help stricken skydiver Selkirk Power (Corin Nemec) from the track "Too Many Notes - Not Enough Rests" has been frequently used in film trailers, most notably The Mask of Zorro (1998), Puss in Boots (2011) and Pirates of the Caribbean: The Curse of the Black Pearl (2003), the latter of which, also scored by Hans Zimmer alongside Klaus Badelt, used an adaptation of the piece as its main theme.

== See also ==
Terminal Velocity, a similarly themed action thriller film released a few months earlier
