= Brock Cole =

American children's author and illustrator

Brock Cole (born May 29, 1938) is an American children's author and illustrator. He is an author and illustrator of pictures books for children as well as a writer of novels and novellas for young adult readers. The subject matter of his juvenile fiction is perhaps more controversial than that of his peers, landing him on the ALA 100 Most Frequently Challenged Books 1990-2000. Though some of his books have been challenged for content, he has become well known for his style and form.

Born in Charlotte, Michigan Cole spent most of his childhood moving around the Midwest with his family, as his father was a dentist in the army during World War II. Cole attended Kenyon College where he earned a bachelor's degree in English in 1960 and then the University of Minnesota where he earned a PhD in Philosophy in 1972. Before becoming an author Cole was a philosophy professor at the University of Wisconsin in Madison.

Cole is married to the Classicist Susan Guettel Cole, who taught at the University of Illinois at Chicago from 1975-1992 and the University at Buffalo from 1992-2008. The Coles reside in Buffalo, New York and have two children and two grandchildren.

== Bibliography ==
While he has written many children's books, among them Buttons, he is best known for his novels and novellas for young adults. The Goats (1987) is on the List of most commonly challenged books in the United States.

=== Children's books ===
- The King at the Door (1979)
- No More Baths (1980)
- Nothing but a Pig (1981)
- The Winter Wren (1984)
- The Giant's Toe (1986)
- Alpha and the Dirty Baby (1991)
- Buttons (2000)
- Larky Mavis (2001)
- Fair Monaco (2003)

=== Young adult books ===
- The Goats (1987)
- Celine (1989)
- The Facts Speak for Themselves (1997)
- Sündenböcke (1988)

=== Illustrations ===
- The Indian in the Cupboard
- Gaffer Sampson's Luck
- George Washington's Teeth
- Gully's Travels

Cole is said to be "a writer who knows and respects the audience for whom he is writing."

== Excerpts ==
(From Buttons)

- "I shall dress in my finest clothes and walk up and down the Palace Bridge. Surely a rich man will fall in love with me and ask me to be his wife. But I will say, 'No! I can never be yours! Not unless you first give me all your buttons!'"
- "Many buttons were lost or destroyed in the process, but who could think of buttons at a time like this?"
