= Chandler Canterbury =

American actor

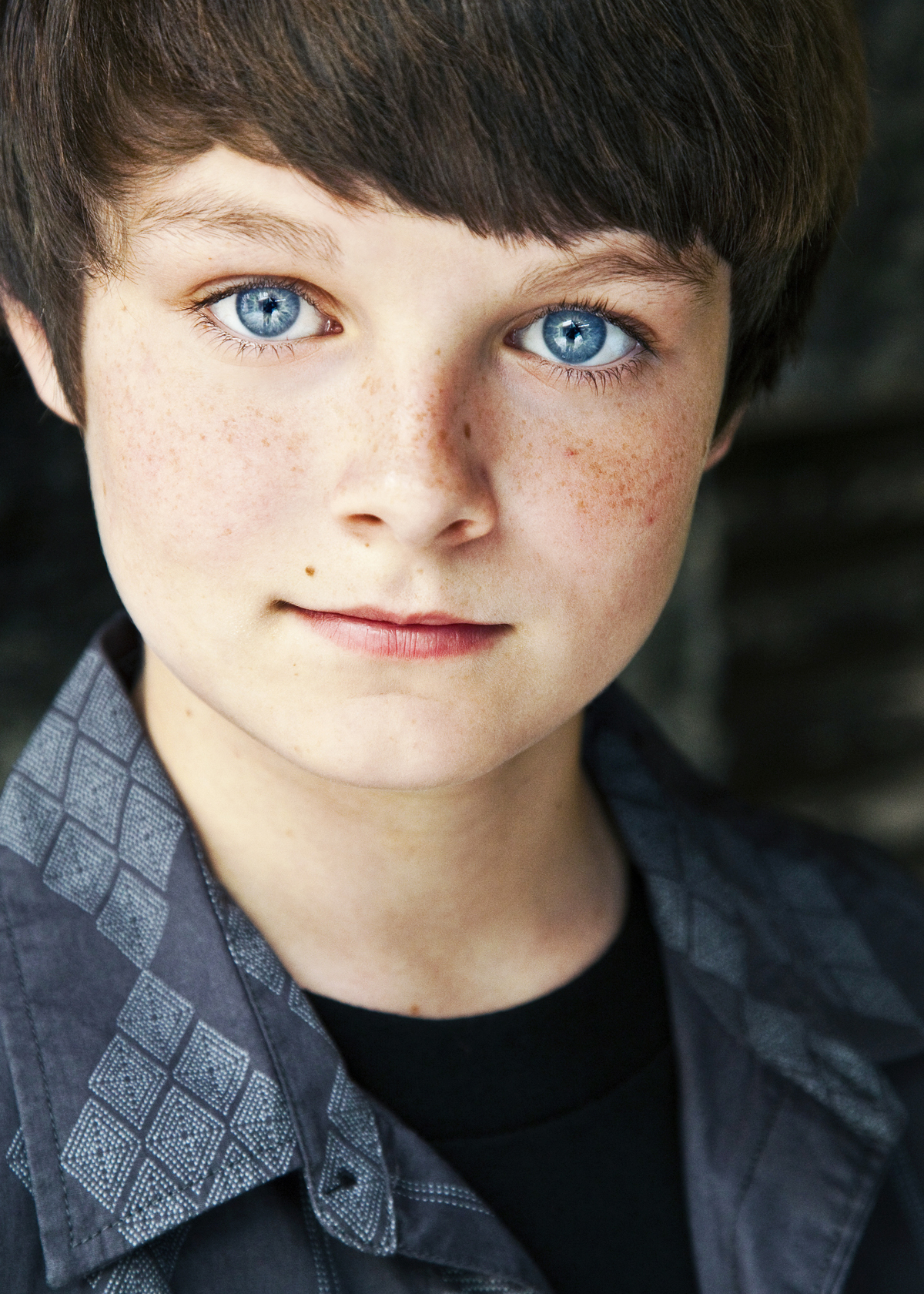
- Canterbury in 2011
- Born: December 15, 1998 (age 27); Houston, Texas, U.S.
- Other name: Chan
- Occupation: Actor
- Years active: 2007–2014

Chandler Canterbury (born December 15, 1998) is an American former child actor.

== Life and career ==
Canterbury was born in Houston, Texas to mother Kristine Canterbury and father Russell Canterbury. He has an older brother Colby and younger sister Shelby, who are both actors, as well.

In 2007, Canterbury's acting debut was in season 3 episode 2 of the television series Criminal Minds, which led to him receiving a 2008 Young Artist Award.

In 2008, he was in The Curious Case of Benjamin Button as the title character.

In 2009, Canterbury starred in the thriller Knowing. He also appeared in Timothy Linh Bui's Powder Blue.

In 2010, he appeared in the psychological thriller After Life. He also appeared in Universal's Repo Men.

In 2011, he played young Peter Bishop in the Fringe episode "Subject 13".

In 2013, he co-starred in The Host and played the lead character opposite Annalise Basso in Standing Up.

== Filmography ==
Year	Film	Role	Notes
2007	Criminal Minds	David Smith	Television series (Episode "In Name and Blood")
2008	The Curious Case of Benjamin Button	Benjamin Button - Age 8	
2009	Balls Out: Gary the Tennis Coach	Young Gary	
2009	Knowing	Caleb Koestler	
2009	Powder Blue	Billy	
2009	After.Life	Jack	
2010	Repo Men	Peter	
2010	R.L. Stine's The Haunting Hour	Tim	Television series (Episode "My Robot")
2011	Fringe	Young Peter Bishop	Television series (Episode "Subject 13")
2011	A Bag of Hammers	Kelsey	
2012	Little Red Wagon	Zach Bonner	Lead Role, Also Co-Producer
2013	Standing Up	Howie	Lead Role
2013	Angels Sing	David Walker	
2013	The Host	Jamie Stryder	Lead Cast
2014	Black Eyed Dog	Malick	Film also known as Plastic Jesus

== Awards ==
Award	Year	Category	Result	Work
Young Artist Awards	2008	Best Performance in a TV Series - Guest Starring Young Actor	Won	Criminal Minds
Young Artist Awards	2010	Best Performance in a Feature Film - Supporting Young Actor	Nominated	Knowing
Young Artist Awards	2011	Best Performance in a Feature Film - Supporting Young Actor Ten and Under	Nominated	After.Life
Young Artist Awards	2012	Best Performance in a TV Show - Guest Starring Young Actor 11-13	Nominated	Fringe
Young Artist Awards	2013	Best Performance in a Feature Film - Young Actor Ten and Under	Nominated	A Bag of Hammers
Young Artist Awards	2014	Best Performance in a Feature Film - Leading Young Actor	Nominated	Standing Up
