= XXX (film series) =

American spy action film series by Rich Wilkes

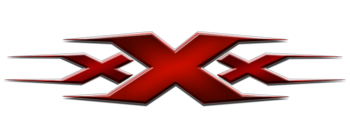
- Official film series logo
- Directed by: Rob Cohen (1); Lee Tamahori (2); D. J. Caruso (3–4)
- Written by: Rich Wilkes (1); Simon Kinberg (2); F. Scott Frazier (3)
- Produced by: Neal H. Moritz (1–2); Arne Schmidt (2); Joe Roth (3); Jeff Kirschenbaum (3); Vin Diesel (3); Samantha Vincent (3)
- Cinematography: Dean Semler (1); David Tattersall (2); Russell Carpenter (3); Stephen F.Windon (4); Marc Spicer (4)
- Edited by: Chris Lebenzon (1); Joel Negron (1); Paul Rubell (1); Mark Goldblatt (2); Todd E. Miller (2); Steven Rosenblum (2); Christian Wagner (4); Dylan Highsmith (4); Leigh Folsom Boyd (4); Christopher Rouse (4); Jim Page (3–4); Vince Filippone (3–4)
- Music by: Randy Edelman (1); Marco Beltrami (2); Brian Tyler (3); Robert Lydecker (3)
- Production companies: Columbia Pictures (1–2); Revolution Studios (1–4); Original Film (1–2, 4); One Race Films (3–4); Roth/Kirschenbaum Films (3–4)
- Distributed by: Sony Pictures Releasing (1–2); Paramount Pictures (3–4)
- Release dates: August 9, 2002 (1); April 29, 2005 (2); January 20, 2017 (3)
- Running time: 322 minutes
- Country: United States
- Language: English
- Budget: Total (3 films): $215 million
- Box office: Total (3 films): $694 million

XXX (stylized as xXx and pronounced Triple X) is an American action spy film series created by Rich Wilkes. It consists of three full-length feature films: XXX (2002), XXX: State of the Union (2005) and XXX: Return of Xander Cage (2017), and a short film: The Final Chapter: The Death of Xander Cage. The series has grossed $694 million worldwide.

== Films ==
| Film | U.S. release date | Director | Screenwriter | Producer(s) |
|---|---|---|---|---|
| XXX | August 9, 2002 | Rob Cohen | Rich Wilkes | Neal H. Moritz |
| XXX: State of the Union | April 29, 2005 | Lee Tamahori | Simon Kinberg | Neal H. Moritz & Arne L. Schmidt |
| XXX: Return of Xander Cage | January 20, 2017 | D.J. Caruso | F. Scott Frazier | Joe Roth, Jeff Kirschenbaum, Vin Diesel & Samantha Vincent |

=== XXX (2002) ===
The film was released on August 9, 2002, which stars Vin Diesel as Xander Cage, a thrill seeking extreme sports enthusiast, stuntman and rebellious athlete-turned-reluctant spy for the National Security Agency who is sent on a dangerous mission to infiltrate a group of potential Russian terrorists in Central Europe. The film also stars Asia Argento, Marton Csokas and Samuel L. Jackson. It was directed by Rob Cohen, who previously directed The Fast and the Furious (2001), in which Diesel also starred.

=== XXX: State of the Union (2005) ===
The film was released on April 29, 2005, which stars Ice Cube as Darius Stone, a new agent in the Triple X program, who is sent to Washington, D.C. to defuse a power struggle amongst national leaders.

=== XXX: Return of Xander Cage (2017) ===
The film was released on January 20, 2017, and sees the return of Diesel as Xander Cage, who comes out of self-imposed exile, thought to be long dead, and is set on a collision course with a deadly alpha warrior and his team in a race to recover a sinister and seemingly unstoppable weapon known as Pandora's Box. Recruiting an all-new group of thrill-seeking cohorts, Xander finds himself enmeshed in a deadly conspiracy that points to collusion at the highest levels of world governments.

=== Untitled fourth XXX film (TBA) ===
In September 2018, it was announced that a fourth film is in development. The project will be a joint-venture production, with The H Collective and iQiyi after the former acquired franchise rights from Revolution Studios. D. J. Caruso was believed to return as director, while Vin Diesel would reprise his role as Xander Cage. Production was scheduled to begin in early-2019. In November 2018, Jay Chou and Zoe Zhang joined the cast. Japanese rock star and musician Yoshiki was set to serve as the film's composer. In September 2023, it was reiterated that a fourth film was still in development, though production would not be able to start until Diesel completed his work on Fast Forever (2028). In 2024, an article by Deadline reported that the film was stalled due to The H Collective's financial problems and litigation with the xXx franchise film rights.

== Short film ==
=== The Final Chapter: The Death of Xander Cage (2005) ===
Included with the 2005 Director's Cut DVD of the first film is a four-minute short titled The Final Chapter: The Death of Xander Cage, that serves as a prequel to XXX: State of the Union by detailing the alleged death of Xander Cage before the events of that film.

In the short film, Xander is played by Vin Diesel's stunt double Khristian Lupo (who never shows his face or speaks) while reusing some archival lines spoken by Diesel. It also features Leila Arcieri as Jordan King from the first film and John G. Connolly as Lt. Colonel Alabama "Bama" Cobb, one of the villains from xXx: State of the Union who is Deckert's right-hand man, as the man behind the attack on Xander.

The sequence opens with Xander driving in a car with Jordan King. He stops next to his apartment building. King makes sexual overtures to him and they get intimate. Suddenly they hear a noise and Xander goes to check it out. Cobb's men show up and abduct King. They plant a bomb in the building and drop her coat on the steps to trick Xander to his death. After confronting a homeless man, Xander returns to the building. He takes the bait left by Cobb and his henchmen and is apparently blown apart by a huge explosion. His trademark coat survives the blast. Cobb shows up and picks up a piece of burnt skin from Xander's neck which has the Triple X tattoo on it. He remarks "Poor Xander, you never had very much between the ears." His men pick him up and drive off in their car. Cobb's motives for killing Xander are obvious; he doesn't want him to interfere in Deckert's plans. "Feuer Frei" by Rammstein plays in the background during the sequence.

== Cast and crew ==
=== Cast ===
| Characters | Films | | | | Short film |
| Characters | XXX | XXX: State of the Union | XXX: Return of Xander Cage | XXX 4 | The Final Chapter: The Death of Xander Cage |
| Characters | 2002 | 2005 | 2017 | TBA | 2005 |
|---|---|---|---|---|---|
| Xander Cage xXx | Vin Diesel | | Vin Diesel | Vin Diesel | Khristian Lupo |
| Xander Cage xXx | Vin Diesel | | Vin Diesel | Vin Diesel | Vin Diesel (archive recordings) |
| NSA Agent Augustus Eugene Gibbons | Samuel L. Jackson | Samuel L. Jackson | Samuel L. Jackson | | |
| Darius Stone xXx | | Ice Cube | Ice Cube | | |
| Toby Lee Shavers | Michael Roof | Michael Roof | | | |
| Jordan King | Leila Arcieri | | | | Leila Arcieri |
| Alabama "Bama" Cobb | | John G. Connolly | | | John G. Connolly |
| Yorgi | Martin Csokas | | | | |
| Yelena | Asia Argento | | | | |
| Milan Sova | Richy Müller | | | | |
| Kirill | Werner Daehn | | | | |
| Kolya | Petr Jákl | | | | |
| Viktor | Jan Pavel Filipensky | | | | |
| California State Senator Dick Hotchkiss | Tom Everett | | | | |
| El Jefe | Danny Trejo | | | | |
| NSA Agent Jim McGrath | Thomas Ian Griffith | | | | |
| J.J. | Eve | | | | |
| NSA Agent Roger Donnan | William Hope | | | | |
| Ivan Pedgrag | Radek Tomecka | | | | |
| Ivan Podrov | Martin Hub | | | | |
| General George Deckert | | Willem Dafoe | | | |
| NSA Agent Kyle Christopher Steele | | Scott Speedman | | | |
| U.S. President James Sanford | | Peter Strauss | | | |
| Zeke | | Xzibit | | | |
| Charlie Mayweather | | Sunny Mabrey | | | |
| Lola Jackson | | Nona Gaye | | | |
| NSA Agent Meadows | | Ramon De Ocampo | | | |
| Xiang XXX | | | Donnie Yen | | |
| Serena Unger XXX | | | Deepika Padukone | | |
| Becky Clearidge | | | Nina Dobrev | | |
| Adele Wolff | | | Ruby Rose | | |
| Talon | | | Tony Jaa | | |
| Jane Marke | | | Toni Collette | | |
| Harvard "Nicks" Zhou | | | Kris Wu | | |
| Tennyson "Torch" | | | Rory McCann | | |
| CIA Director Anderson | | | Al Sapienza | | |
| Gina Roff | | | Ariadna Gutiérrez | | |
| Hawk | | | Michael Bisping | | |
| Ainsley | | | Hermione Corfield | | |
| Red Erik | | | Andrey Ivchenko | | |
| Neymar Jr. xXx | | | Neymar | | |

=== Crew ===
| Film | Director | Writer(s) | Producer(s) | Cinematographer | Music | Editor(s) |
|---|---|---|---|---|---|---|
| XXX | Rob Cohen | Rich Wilkes | Neal H. Moritz | Dean Semler | Randy Edelman | Chris Lebenzon; Joel Negron; Paul Rubell |
| XXX: State of the Union | Lee Tamahori | Simon Kinberg | Neal H. Moritz; Arne L. Schmidt | David Tattersall | Marco Beltrami | Mark Goldblatt; Todd E. Miller; Steven Rosenblum |
| XXX: Return of Xander Cage | D. J. Caruso | F. Scott Frazier | Joe Roth; Jeff Kirschenbaum; Vin Diesel; Samantha Vincent | Russell Carpenter | Brian Tyler; Robert Lydecker | Jim Page; Vince Filippone |
| XXX 4 | D. J. Caruso | Derek Haas | Joe Roth; Jeff Kirschenbaum; Vin Diesel; Samantha Vincent | TBA | Yoshiki | TBA |

== Reception ==
=== Box office performance ===
| Film | Release date | Box office revenue | | | Box office ranking | | Budget | Reference |
| Film | Release date | North America | Other territories | Worldwide | All time North America | All time worldwide | Budget | Reference |
|---|---|---|---|---|---|---|---|---|
| XXX | August 9, 2002 | $142,109,382 | $135,339,000 | $277,448,382 | #334 | #416 | $70 million | |
| XXX: State of the Union | April 29, 2005 | $26,873,932 | $44,148,761 | $71,022,693 | #2,675 | N/A | $60 million | |
| XXX: Return of Xander Cage | January 20, 2017 | $44,898,413 | $301,065,438 | $345,963,851 | #1,750 | #322 | $85 million | |
| Total | | $213,881,727 | $480,553,199 | $694,434,926 | | | $215 million | |

=== Critical and public response ===
| Film | Rotten Tomatoes | Metacritic | CinemaScore |
|---|---|---|---|
| XXX | 48% (179 reviews) | 48 (33 reviews) | A− |
| XXX: State of the Union | 17% (137 reviews) | 37 (31 reviews) | B+ |
| XXX: Return of Xander Cage | 45% (140 reviews) | 42 (25 reviews) | A− |

The first film received mixed reviews from critics. Roger Ebert called it "as good as a James Bond movie". Adam Smith of Empire magazine called the movie, "Sporadically entertaining, but seriously hampered by a very choppy screenplay", and rating it three out of five stars. The film was nominated for a Razzie Award for Most Flatulent Teen-Targeted Movie, but lost to Jackass: The Movie.

The second film in the series was panned by critics, Boo Allen of the Denton Record Chronicle called it "a chubby, surly, incomprehensible action hero". Brian Orndorf of FilmJerk.com compared watching the film to running "headfirst at top speed into a brick wall". David Hiltbrand of the Philadelphia Inquirer said "the plot swings between pathetically implausible and aggressively stupid". Some critics liked the film. Owen Gleiberman of Entertainment Weekly called it "that rare B movie that's rooted in gut-level stirrings of power and retaliation". Paul Arendt of the BBC said, "Viewed on its own trashy terms, it succeeds brilliantly".

The third film received mixed reviews from critics. Dan Jolin of Empire magazine said, "We've seen all these stunts pulled before, and seen them done better, but there's some pleasure to be had here — even if it's of the extremely guilty kind.", rating it three out of five stars. Andrew Lapin of Uproxx gave the film a negative review, saying: "There is an intellectual argument to be made in favor of the Fast & Furious franchise, which features diverse casts, operatic plotlines, and cartoon setpieces that often look like a child assembled them out of Hot Wheels sets. xXx is aiming for a much lower bar, striving only to be marketable, not inventive. The series is no longer interested in aping James Bond, lacking as it does a decent gadget or supervillain and often highlighting the sidekicks at the expense of Xander himself."

== Video games ==
A video game featuring Xander Cage was produced for Game Boy Advance, released in North America and Europe in 2002. The Game Boy Advance game received a rating of E in North America and 3+ rating in Europe unlike the film's PG-13 rating. In 2004, a XXX game was in development for the Xbox by Warthog Games, but it was cancelled.
