= Dunnellon High School =

Public school in Florida, US

Location
- 10055 SW 180th Ave Rd; Dunnellon, Marion County, FL; United States; 29.071206°N 82.086764°W

Information
- School type: Public, Secondary
- Established: 1945
- School district: Marion County Public Schools
- Principal: Wade Martin
- Teaching staff: 68.00 (FTE)
- Grades: 9-12
- Gender: Coeducational
- Enrollment: 1,562 (2024-2025)
- Student to teacher ratio: 22.97
- Colors: Red, Black, and White
- Mascot: Tiger
- Accreditation: Florida Department of Education; Southern Association of Colleges and Schools (SACS)
- Website: Dunnellon High School

Dunnellon High School is an American secondary school located in Dunnellon, Florida. The school serves students from Marion, Levy and Citrus counties. The student population of 1050 is 58% majority and 42% minority. Dunnellon High School is served by two magnet programs: The Advanced Studies Program and The Power Generation Academy.

== Curriculum ==
Dunnellon provides education from 9th through 12th Grades. The school has been approved as an Early College site by the College of Central Florida and currently offers nine Dual Enrollment classes on campus, as well as eleven Advanced Placement courses. The following vocational programs are also offered: Health Occupations, Administrative Office Tech, Culinary Arts, Agriculture, Building Construction, Early Childhood Education, Digital Video Productions, Power Generation, Game Simulations, Web Design, and Teacher Assisting. Arts programs in 2-D Art, 3-D Art, Band, Chorus, Guitar, and Theater are also offered. Washington Post columnist Jay Mathews, in his annual America's Most Challenging High Schools Challenge Index rankings listed Dunnellon High School for the first time in 2015.

The school used to have an Air Force Junior Reserve Officer Training Corps (AFJROTC) program, which was shut down in 2023.

== Sports ==
Dunnellon has won FHSAA state championships in Football (1978, 1979), Girls Basketball (1986), and Softball (2009, 2010). Former NFL players Terrence Brooks and Lerentee McCray are Dunnellon High School graduates. The Tiger Girls Basketball, Boys Basketball, and Softball teams all won district championships in 2015.

== Notable alumni ==
- Terrence Brooks, NFL player
- Ricky Easmon, former NFL player
- Lerentee McCray, NFL player
- Ernie Mills, former NFL player
