= Dunnellon, Florida =

- City
- City of Dunnellon
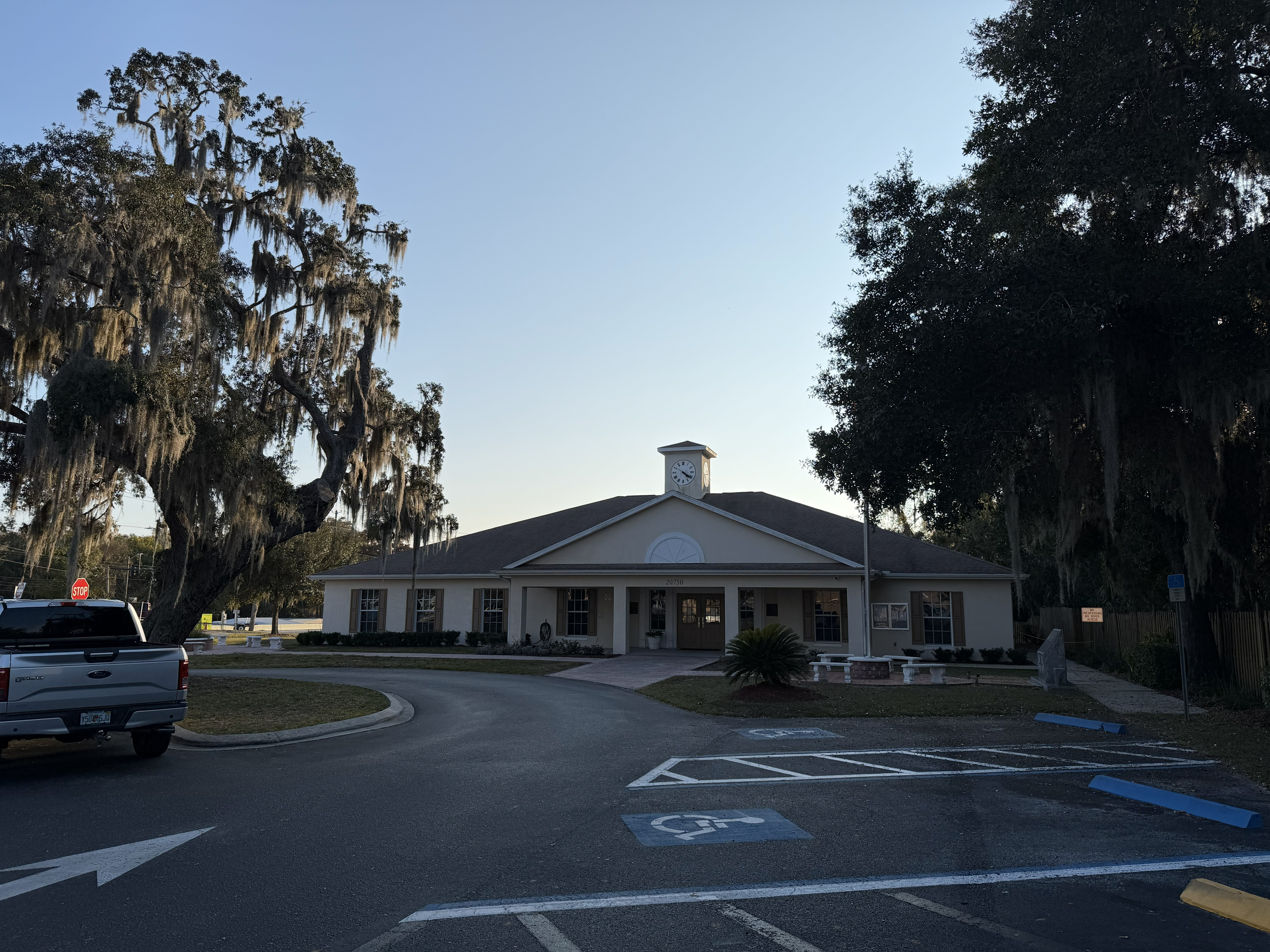
- Dunnellon City Hall

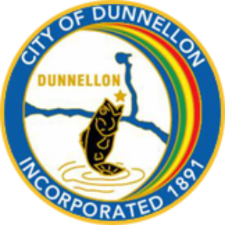
- Seal
- Nickname: Boomtown
- Location in Marion County and the state of Florida
- Coordinates: 29°03′26″N 82°25′44″W
- Country: United States
- State: Florida
- County: Marion
- Settled: 1887
- Platted: 1890
- Incorporated: 1891

Government
  - Type: Council–Manager
  - Mayor: Walter Green
  - Vice Mayor: Tim Inskeep
  - Councilmembers: Rex Lehmann, Valerie Hanchar, and Reese Taschenberger
  - City Clerk: Amanda "Mandy" L. Odom
  - City Attorney: Andrew J. Hand

Area
  - Total: 9.12 sq mi (23.61 km^{2})
  - Land: 8.81 sq mi (22.83 km^{2})
  - Water: 0.30 sq mi (0.77 km^{2})
- Elevation: 49 ft (15 m)

Population (2020)
  - Total: 1,928
  - Density: 218.7/sq mi (84.43/km^{2})
- Time zone: UTC-5 (Eastern (EST))
  - Summer (DST): UTC-4 (EDT)
- ZIP codes: 34430-34432
- Area code: 352
- FIPS code: 12-18675
- GNIS feature ID: 2403519
- Website: www.dunnellon.org

Dunnellon (/dəˈnɛlən/) is a city in Marion County, Florida, United States. The population was 1,928 at the 2020 census, up from 1,733 in 2010. It is part of the Ocala Metropolitan Statistical Area.

== History ==
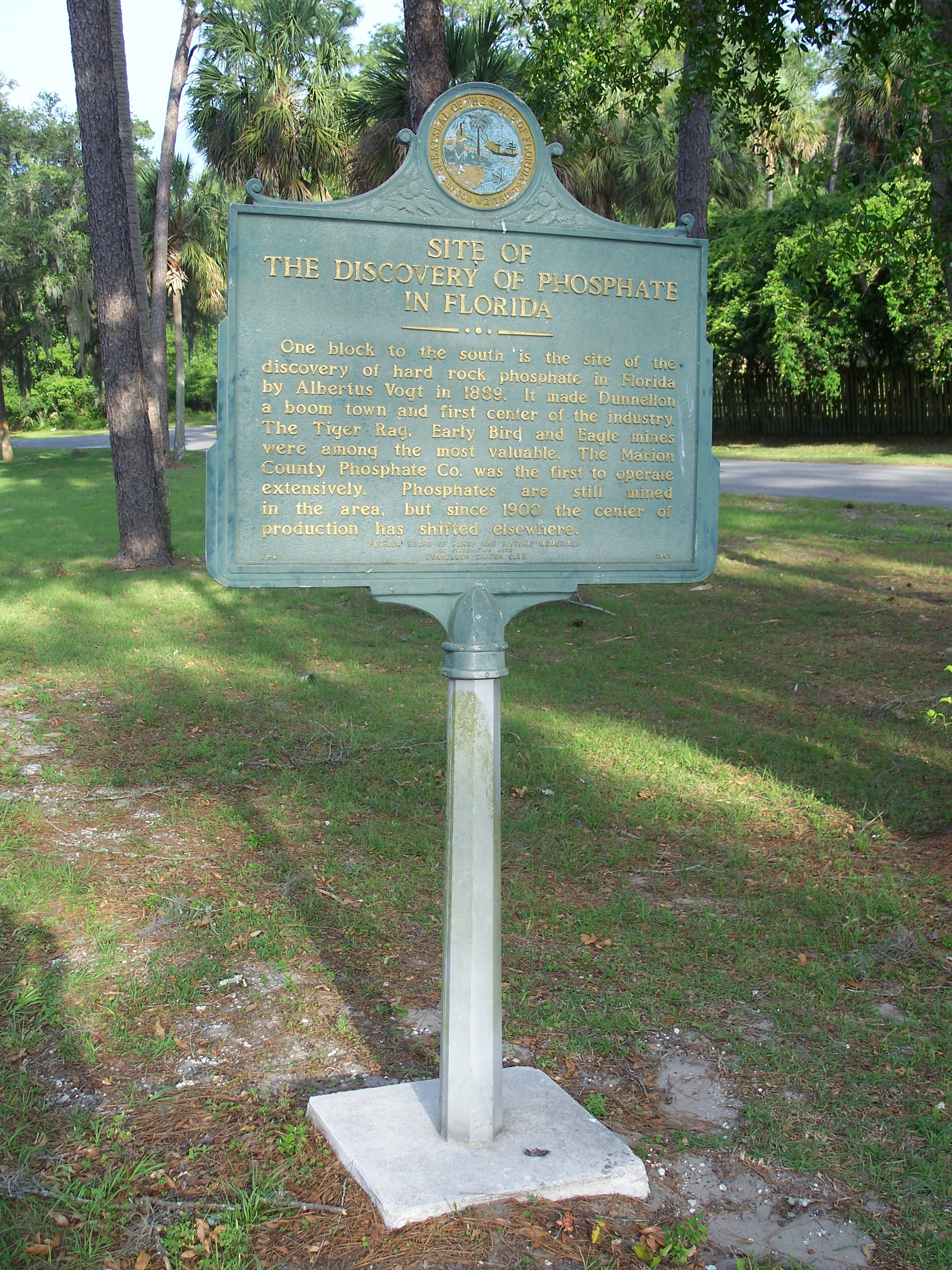
Plaque marking the discovery of phosphate in Dunnellon

Dunnellon was founded in 1887, two years before the 1889 discovery of phosphate in the area. The community was named after, John F. Dunn, an early settler who worked in the railroad industry. The City of Dunnellon was platted in 1890, and officially incorporated as a municipality in 1891. The subsequent mining boom, the first of its kind in Florida, lasted until the early 1910s, but the city's nickname is still known as "Boomtown". The original mining took place in and around the Rainbow River (then called Blue Run,) using the river's natural flow to transport phosphates. One of the original mining pits is now called the 'Blue Cove' subdivision. Phosphate industry operations began to shift south to the Polk County area, and by the 1960s, Dunnellon's last mine closed. Dunnellon survived the bust period, unlike other nearby phosphate communities that became ghost towns, such as Romeo, LeRoy, Brewster, and Parkersburg.

Areas in and around Dunnellon served as filming locations for the 2001 horror film Jeepers Creepers, with a great deal of location work on Tiger Trail (also known as High School Road), the road to Dunnellon High School, officially known as SW 180th Avenue Rd., just outside Rainbow Springs State Park.

== Geography ==
Dunnellon is located in southwestern Marion County due north of Tampa. It is bordered to the southwest by the Withlacoochee River, which forms the border with Citrus County. Dunnellon is bordered to the north by unincorporated Rainbow Springs.

U.S. Route 41 passes through the city, leading north 24 miles (39 km) to Williston and south 18 miles (29 km) to Inverness. Ocala, the Marion county seat, is 24 miles (39 km) to the northeast.

According to the United States Census Bureau, Dunnellon has a total area of 9.1 square miles (24 km^{2}), of which 8.8 square miles (23 km^{2}) are land and 0.3 square miles (0.8 km^{2}), or 3.27%, are water. The Rainbow River joins the Withlacoochee River in Dunnellon, with the combined flow leading west toward the Gulf of Mexico.

=== Climate ===
The climate in this area is characterized by hot, humid summers and generally mild winters. According to the Köppen climate classification, the City of Dunnellon has a humid subtropical climate zone (Cfa).

== Demographics ==
Historical population
Census	Pop.	Note	%±
1890	532		—
1900	700		31.6%
1910	1,227		75.3%
1920	1,185		−3.4%
1930	1,194		0.8%
1940	1,066		−10.7%
1950	1,110		4.1%
1960	1,079		−2.8%
1970	1,146		6.2%
1980	1,427		24.5%
1990	1,624		13.8%
2000	1,898		16.9%
2010	1,733		−8.7%
2020	1,928		11.3%
U.S. Decennial Census

=== Racial and ethnic composition ===
Dunnellon racial composition (Hispanics excluded from racial categories) (NH = Non-Hispanic)
Race	Pop 2010	Pop 2020	% 2010	% 2020
White (NH)	1,453	1,543	83.84%	80.03%
Black or African American (NH)	158	125	9.12%	6.48%
Native American or Alaska Native (NH)	2	5	0.12%	0.26%
Asian (NH)	12	13	0.69%	0.67%
Pacific Islander or Native Hawaiian (NH)	0	0	0.00%	0.00%
Some other race (NH)	5	8	0.29%	0.41%
Two or more races/Multiracial (NH)	17	66	0.98%	3.42%
Hispanic or Latino (any race)	86	168	4.96%	8.71%
Total	1,733	1,928		

=== 2020 census ===
As of the 2020 census, Dunnellon had a population of 1,928. The median age was 58.5 years. 15.1% of residents were under the age of 18 and 37.3% of residents were 65 years of age or older. For every 100 females there were 81.0 males, and for every 100 females age 18 and over there were 78.5 males age 18 and over.

92.8% of residents lived in urban areas, while 7.2% lived in rural areas.

There were 1,000 households in Dunnellon, of which 18.3% had children under the age of 18 living in them. Of all households, 36.1% were married-couple households, 20.0% were households with a male householder and no spouse or partner present, and 38.9% were households with a female householder and no spouse or partner present. About 40.4% of all households were made up of individuals and 24.5% had someone living alone who was 65 years of age or older.

There were 1,284 housing units, of which 22.1% were vacant. The homeowner vacancy rate was 3.3% and the rental vacancy rate was 11.5%.

In 2020, there were 546 families residing in the city.

=== 2010 census ===
As of the 2010 United States census, there were 1,733 people, 824 households, and 377 families residing in the city.

=== 2000 census ===
As of the census of 2000, there were 1,898 people, 950 households, and 555 families residing in the city. The population density was 269.3 inhabitants per square mile (104.0/km^{2}). There were 1,128 dwelling units at an average density of 160.0 per square mile (61.8/km^{2}). The racial makeup of the city was 85.72% White, 11.85% African American, 0.11% Native American, 0.53% Asian, 0.05% Pacific Islander, 0.47% from other races, and 1.26% from two or more races. Hispanic or Latino of any race were 1.79% of the population.

In 2000, there were 950 households, out of which 18.5% had children under the age of 18 living with them, 44.6% were married couples living together, 11.4% had a female householder with no husband present, and 41.5% were non-families. 37.3% of all households were made up of individuals, and 24.4% had someone living alone who was 65 years of age or older. The average household size was 2.00 and the average family size was 2.59.

In 2000, in the city, the population was spread out, with 17.2% under the age of 18, 5.1% from 18 to 24, 17.7% from 25 to 44, 24.6% from 45 to 64, and 35.5% who were 65 years of age or older. The median age was 53 years. For every 100 females, there were 80.9 males. For every 100 females age 18 and over, there were 75.8 males.

In 2000, the median income for a household in the city was $27,386, and the median income for a family was $35,313. Males had a median income of $29,605 versus $22,045 for females. The per capita income for the city was $17,905. About 10.4% of families and 15.5% of the population were below the poverty line, including 26.7% of those under age 18 and 11.3% of those age 65 or over.

== Transportation ==
=== Major roads ===
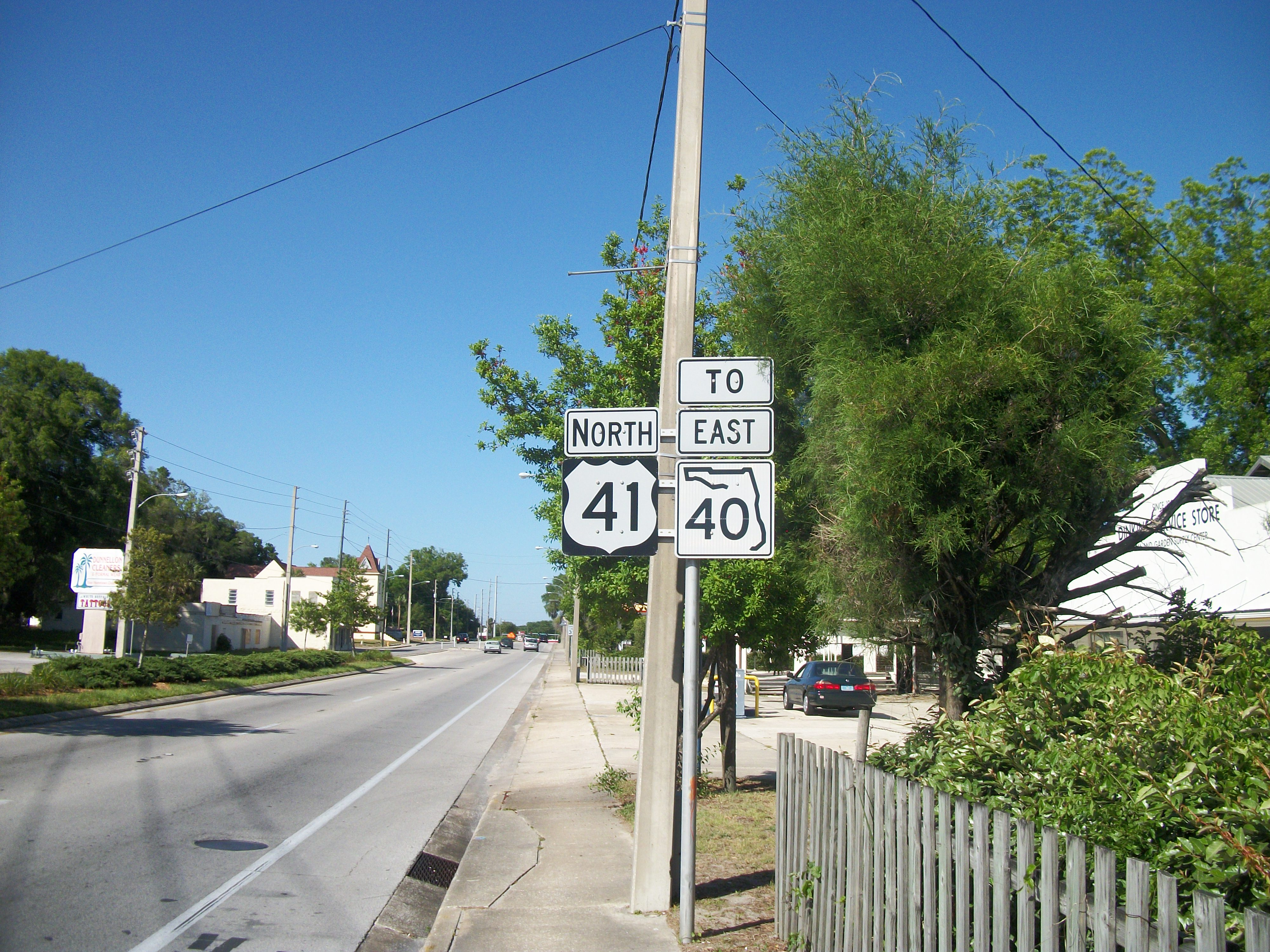
Northbound US 41 where it shares a hidden concurrency with SR 40.

- The main road through Dunnellon is US 41 a major south-to-north highway that runs from Miami to the Upper Peninsula of Michigan.

County roads include County Roads 40, 336, and 484, all three of which run along Pennsylvania Avenue.

- County Road 40 is a bi-county road that begins along the Gulf of Mexico in Yankeetown in Levy County, and merges with CR 336 before entering the city limits and turning north onto US 41 as hidden State Road 40 where it branches off on its own in Rainbow Lakes Estates north of the city.
- County Road 336 is another bi-county road, but this one spans southeast from western Levy County, and merges with CR 40 west of the city limits before terminating at US 41, where CR 40 turns north and Pennsylvania Avenue becomes CR 484.
- County Road 484, is a major county road in southern Marion County which begins at the terminus of CR 336 and its multiplex with CR 40. It leads to Marion Oaks, and spans as far east as US 27-441 in Summerfield.

=== Other transportation ===
Dunnellon had four railroad lines in the past: two owned by the Atlantic Coast Line Railroad, one owned by the Seaboard Air Line Railroad and one owned by the Florida Northern Railroad. Multiple boat launching areas exists along the Withlacoochee River. Just outside the city, the Dunnellon/Marion County Airport can be found along CR 484.

== Notable people ==
- Terrence Brooks, American football NFL safety for the New York Jets
- Max Lanier, former MLB baseball player
- Lerentee McCray, former NFL outside linebacker and defensive end for the Denver Broncos
- Kelly Meggs, leader of the Florida Chapter of the Oath Keepers militia, convicted of seditious conspiracy for his role in the January 6, 2021, insurrection at the U.S. Capitol
- Ernie Mills, former NFL football player, Pittsburgh Steelers
- Terry Plumeri, classical composer, orchestra conductor, double bassist, lecturer, teacher, producer, and film score composer
- Michael Roof, actor from the XXX films, The Dukes of Hazzard movie, Black Hawk Down and Raising the Roofs

== See also ==
- Dunnellon Boomtown Historic District
