= Rich Wilkes =

American filmmaker (born 1966)

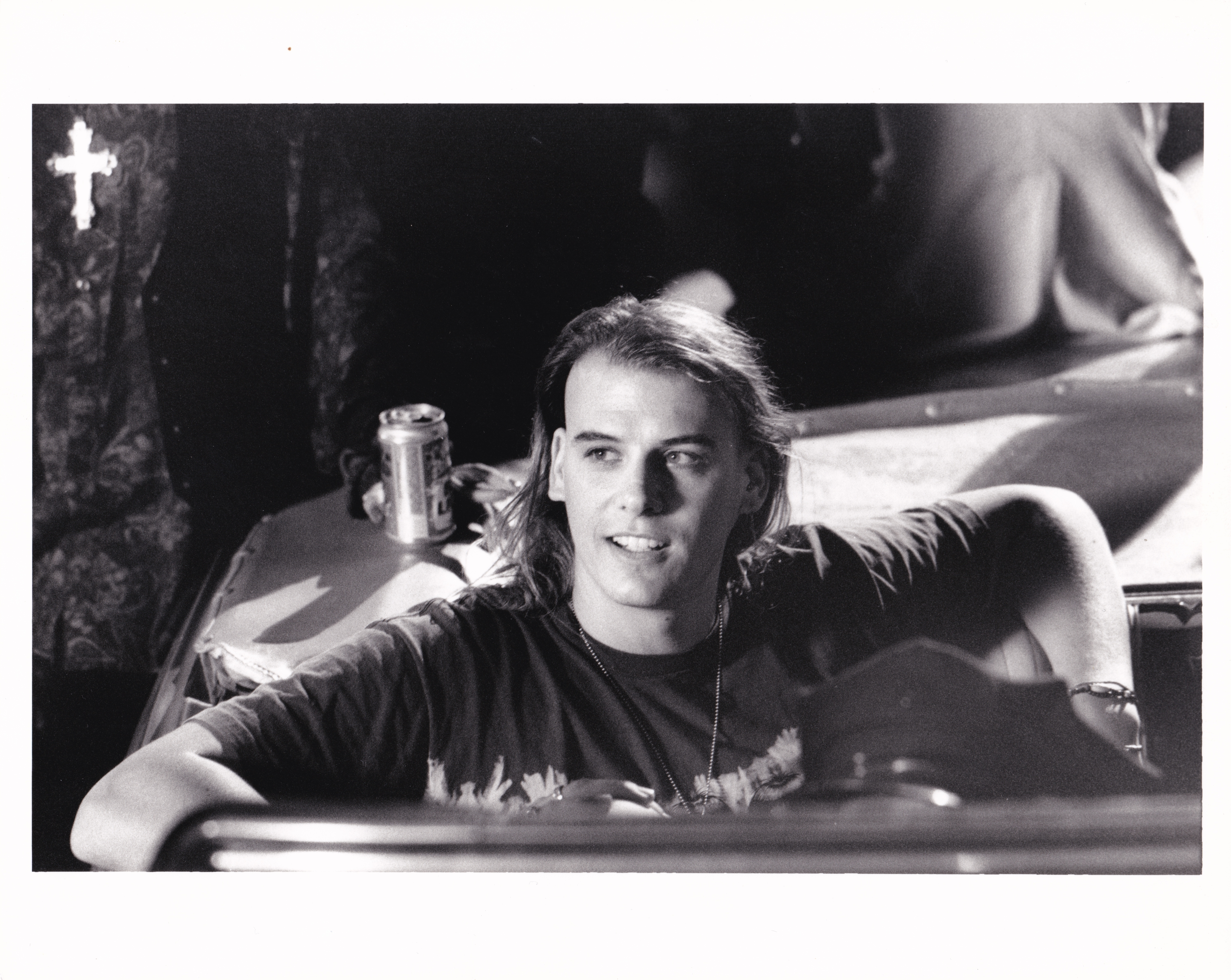
Rich Wilkes as the "Corduroy Rocker" in Airheads

Rich Wilkes (born 1966) is an American screenwriter, actor, filmmaker and musician. His work is noted for its rooting in contemporary music and youth culture.

== Works ==
=== As Screenwriter ===
Wilkes' major-studio debut was as screenwriter of the 1994 film Airheads. The story revolves around a group of loser musicians called The Lone Rangers who take a radio station hostage to get their song played on the radio. Airheads was directed by Michael Lehmann and distributed by 20th Century Fox.

This was followed by a co-writer credit (alongside director James Melkonian) for the 1994 comedy The Stoned Age, set in the stoner subculture of Southern California during the year 1980.

The same writing and directing team then collaborated with The Jerky Boys to create the 1995 production The Jerky Boys: The Movie, featuring the eponymous comedians (self-described as "low-lifes from Queens") as New York City youths who get into trouble with the Mafia when one of their prank calls leads them into a money laundering business.

Wilkes is credited as the sole screenwriter for the 2002 action-adventure film XXX and has a "based on characters created by" credit for the XXX film series.

Wilkes co-wrote the Mötley Crüe biopic The Dirt, based on the New York Times bestselling book by Neil Strauss and Mötley Crüe. The film took 17 years to get made. David Fincher was initially attached to direct in 2004, followed by Larry Charles in 2008.

Wilkes has collaborated repeatedly with David Fincher, including co-writing an HBO television series set in the world of 1980s music videos.

=== As Writer/Director ===
In 1995, Wilkes debuted as a director with Glory Daze, a semi-autobiographical tale based on his experiences as a student at the University of California, Santa Cruz.

=== Other Film Work ===
Wilkes has also appeared as an actor in the majority of his productions, primarily in minor roles. He has also appeared as himself in several documentaries, including the 1998 production Independent's Day, 2003's The Blockbuster Imperative and 2006's Punk Like Me.

=== As Musician ===
Wilkes was the lead singer of the "world's original punk rock mariachi band" Carne Asada. The band was put together as a prank to get on the Vans Warped Tour. The story of Carne Asada was told in the award winning music documentary Punk Like Me.

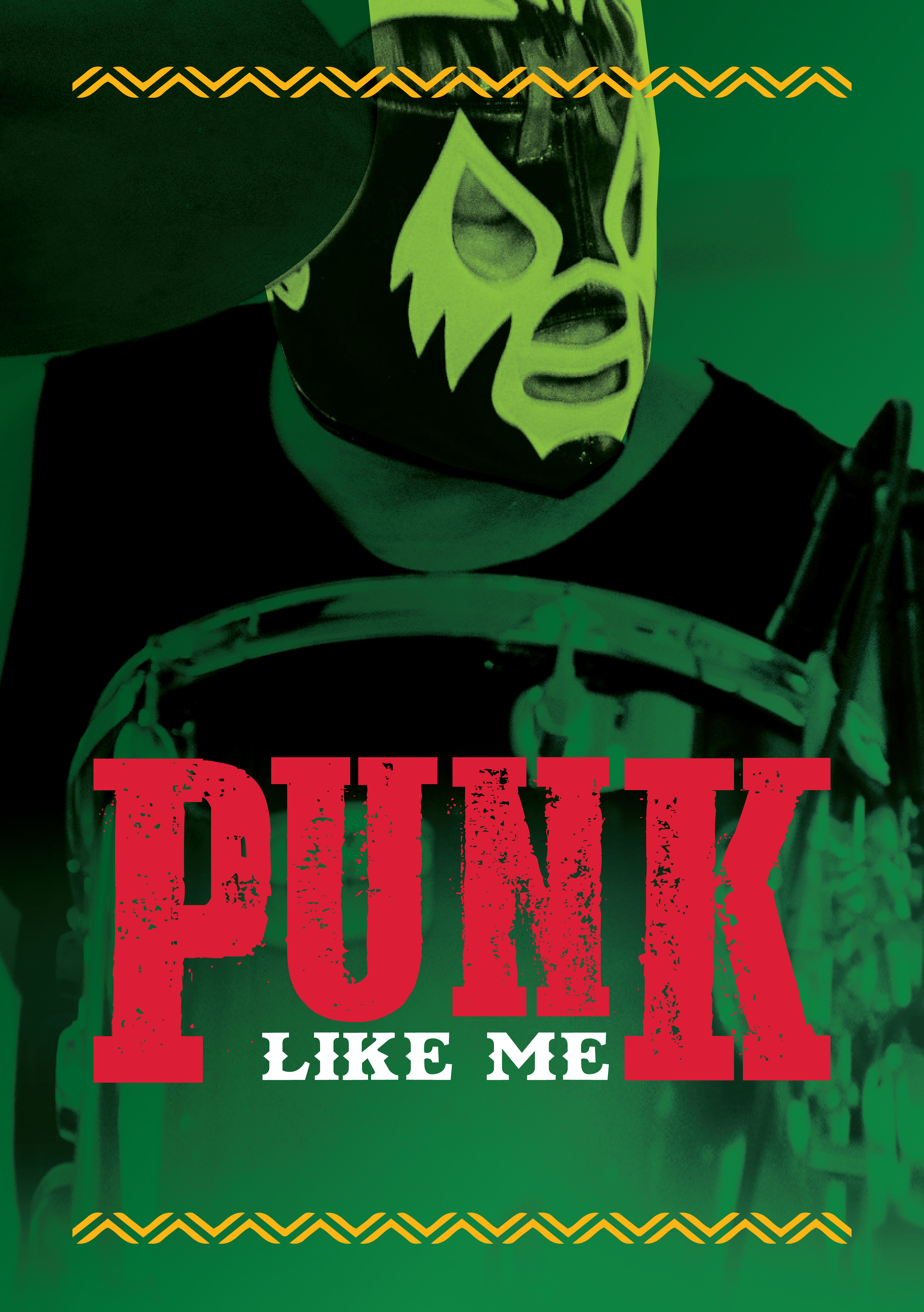
Poster for the music documentary Punk Like Me (2006)

== Personal life ==
Wilkes was born in Princeton, New Jersey. He attended El Camino High School in Oceanside, California. He obtained a BA from the University of California, Santa Cruz, then studied screenwriting at the American Film Institute.

== Humanitarian Work ==
Wilkes has been involved in humanitarian efforts in support of Ukraine during the ongoing Russo-Ukrainian War. In January 2026, he joined a volunteer convoy and drove a truck 1,300 miles across Europe from Oxfordshire, England to Lviv, Ukraine, where it was donated to Ukrainian soldiers.

== Filmography ==
=== Films ===
Year	Title	Role	Notes
2020	Bulletproof 2		Co-Writer and Story by
2019	The Dirt		Co-Writer
2017	XXX: Return of Xander Cage		Writer (characters)
2013	XXX (short)		Writer (characters)
2008	Art House, Vol. 1: Basic Shapes and Animals		Executive Producer
2006	Punk Like Me	Self, Rico Suave	Actor, Writer, Executive Producer
2005	XXX: State of the Union		Writer (characters)
2003	Men of Action (short)	The Director	Actor
2002	XXX	Tall Guy	Creator, Writer, Actor
1995	Glory Daze		Writer, Director
1995	The Jerky Boys: The Movie		Co-Writer
1994	The Stoned Age		Co-Writer, Actor
1994	Airheads	Corduroy Rocker	Writer, Actor

=== Television ===
Year	Title	Role	Notes
2003	Vegas Dick (pilot)		Writer, Executive Producer
2001	Beer Money (movie)	Nick the Hollywood Snake	Writer, Actor, Executive Producer
1999	Fear of a Punk Planet (series)		Director (pilot)
