= Lerentee McCray =

American football player (born 1990)

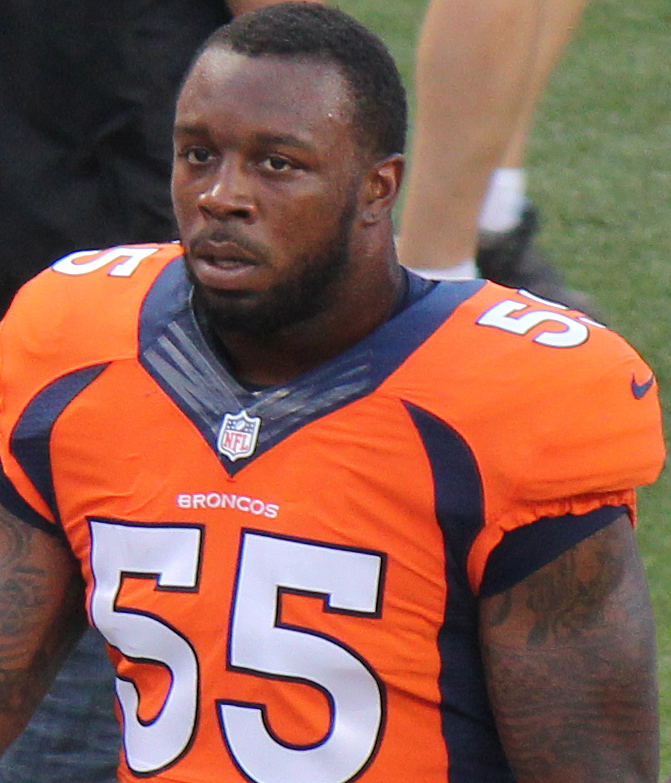
- McCray with the Denver Broncos in 2014

No. 55, 56
- Position: Defensive end

Personal information
- Born: August 26, 1990 (age 36); Gainesville, Florida, U.S.
- Listed height: 6 ft 3 in (1.91 m)
- Listed weight: 250 lb (113 kg)

Career information
- High school: Dunnellon (Dunnellon, Florida)
- College: Florida (2008–2012)
- NFL draft: 2013: undrafted

Career history
- Denver Broncos (2013–2015); Green Bay Packers (2016)*; Buffalo Bills (2016); Jacksonville Jaguars (2017–2021)
- * Offseason or practice squad member only

Awards and highlights
- Super Bowl champion (50)

Career NFL statistics
- Total tackles: 75
- Sacks: 6.0
- Forced fumbles: 2
- Stats at Pro Football Reference

Lerentee Zavonne McCray (born August 26, 1990) is an American former professional football player who was a defensive end in the National Football League (NFL). He played college football for the Florida Gators. McCray was signed by the Denver Broncos as an undrafted free agent in 2013. He was also a member of the Green Bay Packers, Buffalo Bills and Jacksonville Jaguars.

== Early life ==
McCray attended Dunnellon High School, where he played wide receiver, linebacker, and on special teams. As a junior, he recorded 97 tackles and 11 sacks. McCray produced 118 tackles and nine sacks during his senior year, averaging 17 tackles a game. Rivals.com ranked him as the 10th best outside linebacker and a four-star prospect.

== College career ==
McCray played college football for the Gators at the University of Florida from 2008 to 2012.

== Professional career ==
Pre-draft measurables
Height	Weight	Arm length	Hand span
6 ft 2 1/8 in (1.88 m)	250 lb (113 kg)	33 3/8 in (0.85 m)	10 in (0.25 m)
All values from NFL Combine

=== Denver Broncos ===
After going undrafted in the 2013 NFL draft, McCray signed with the Denver Broncos on April 27, 2013. In the 2015 season, McCray and the Broncos reached Super Bowl 50. The Broncos would defeat the Carolina Panthers by a score of 24–10.

=== Green Bay Packers ===
McCray was signed by the Green Bay Packers on April 18, 2016.

=== Buffalo Bills ===
On August 30, 2016, McCray was traded to the Buffalo Bills in exchange for a conditional seventh round draft pick in 2018.

=== Jacksonville Jaguars ===
On March 9, 2017, McCray signed a one-year contract with the Jacksonville Jaguars.

On March 16, 2018, McCray re-signed with the Jaguars on a one-year contract.

On November 18, 2019, McCray was placed on injured reserve.

McCray re-signed with the Jaguars on March 30, 2020. On August 1, 2020, he announced he would opt out of the 2020 season due to the COVID-19 pandemic.

=== Statistics ===
Source: NFL.com

Year	Team	Games		Tackles					Interceptions						Fumbles	
Year	Team	GP	GS	Comb	Total	Ast	Sck	SFTY	PDef	Int	Yds	Avg	Lng	TDs	FF	FR
Regular season
2014	DEN	13	0	6	4	2	1.0	0	1	0	0	0.0	0	0	1	0
2015	DEN	11	0	15	9	6	0.5	0	0	0	0	0.0	0	0	0	0
2016	BUF	13	0	16	8	8	2.5	0	0	0	0	0.0	0	0	1	0
2017	JAX	13	0	12	7	5	1.5	0	1	0	0	0.0	0	0	0	0
Total		50	0	49	28	21	5.5	0	2	0	0	0.0	0	0	2	0
Postseason
2014	DEN	1	0	2	1	1	0.0	0	0	0	0	0.0	0	0	0	0
2015	DEN	3	0	0	0	0	0.0	0	0	0	0	0.0	0	0	0	0
2017	JAX	3	0	3	0	3	0.0	0	0	0	0	0.0	0	0	0	0
Total		7	0	5	1	4	0.0	0	0	0	0	0.0	0	0	0	0

== Legal issues ==
On January 16, 2022, McCray was arrested in Tavares, Florida after leading police on a high-speed chase. McCray had been going 88 mph in a 50 mph zone and flipped police officers off before fleeing. He currently faces a second degree felony of fleeing and eluding police with disregard of safety to persons and property.
