= Dunnellon Boomtown Historic District =

Historic district in Florida, United States

- U.S. National Register of Historic Places
- U.S. Historic district
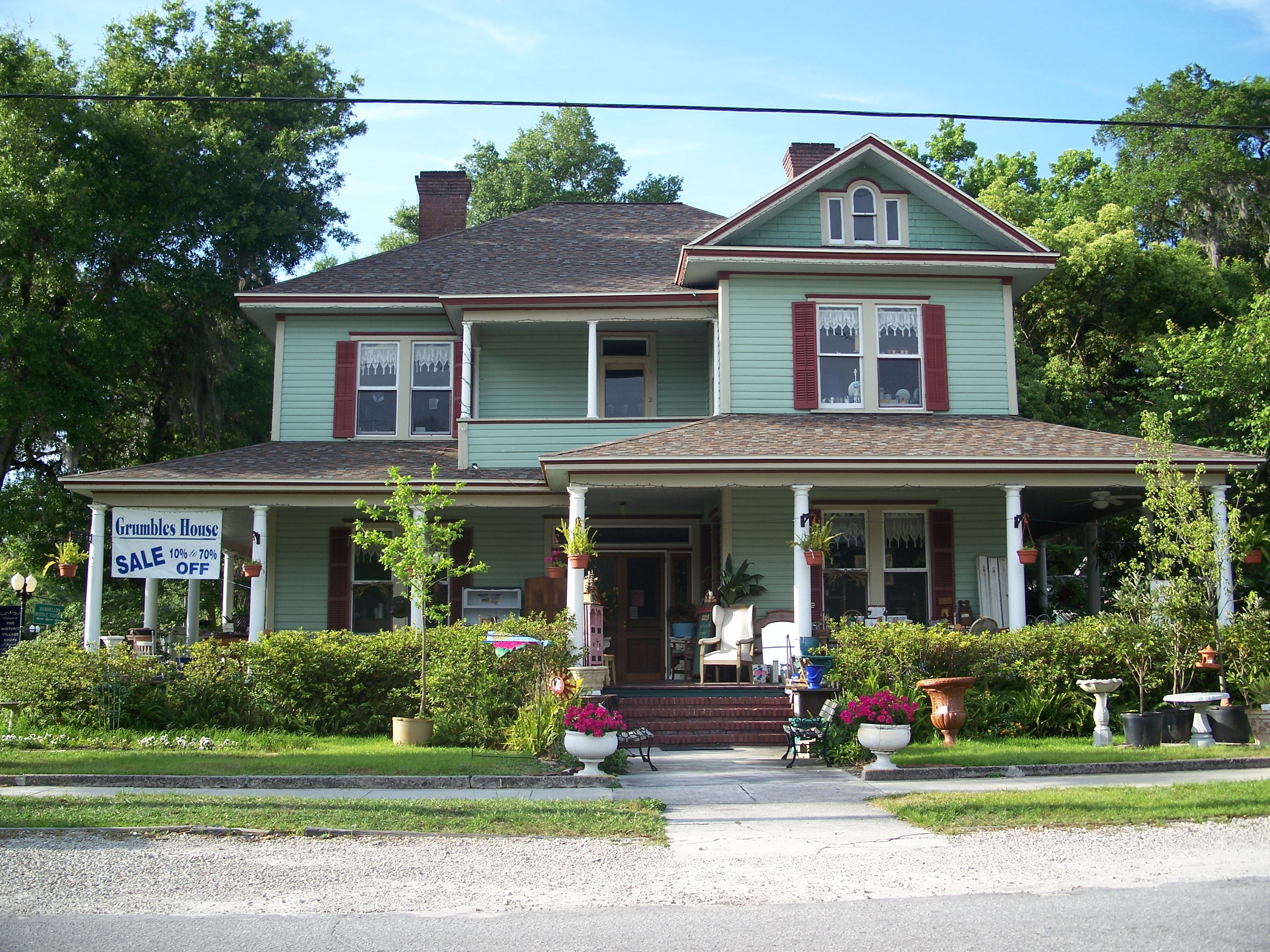
- House in the district

- Location within Florida Location within the United States
- Location: Dunnellon, Florida
- Coordinates: 29°3′5″N 82°27′48″W
- Area: 560 acres (2.3 km^{2})
- NRHP reference No.: 88002807
- Added to NRHP: December 8, 1988

The Dunnellon Boomtown Historic District is a U.S. historic district (designated as such on December 8, 1988) located in Dunnellon, Florida. The district is bounded by McKinney Avenue, Illinois Street, Pennsylvania Avenue, and Cedar Street. It contains 70 historic buildings.
