= Ernie Mills =

American football player and coach (born 1968)

No. 89, 85, 80
- Position: Wide receiver

Personal information
- Born: October 28, 1968 (age 58); Dunnellon, Florida, U.S.
- Listed height: 5 ft 11 in (1.80 m)
- Listed weight: 192 lb (87 kg)

Career information
- High school: Dunnellon
- College: Florida
- NFL draft: 1991: 3rd round, 73rd overall pick

Career history

Playing
- Pittsburgh Steelers (1991–1996); Carolina Panthers (1997); Dallas Cowboys (1998–1999)

Coaching
- Jacksonville University (2007–2012) Wide receivers coach; Florida A&M University (2013–2015) Wide receivers coach

Awards and highlights
- Second-team All-SEC (1990)

Career NFL statistics
- Receptions: 196
- Receiving yards: 2,934
- Receiving touchdowns: 20
- Kickoff returns: 80
- Return yards: 1,818
- Stats at Pro Football Reference

Ernest Lee Mills, III (born October 28, 1968) is an American former professional football player who was a wide receiver in the National Football League (NFL) for the Pittsburgh Steelers, Carolina Panthers and Dallas Cowboys. He played college football for the Florida Gators.

== Early life ==
Mills was born in Dunnellon, Florida and attended Dunnellon High School. He was a two-way player at cornerback and running back.

As a senior, he tallied 53 tackles, 8 interceptions and 414 rushing yards. He earned a second-team All-state selection at defensive back.

== College career ==
Mills accepted a football scholarship from the University of Florida, where he was a four-year letterman for head coaches Galen Hall and Steve Spurrier's Florida Gators football teams from 1987 to 1990.

As a freshman, he was converted into a wide receiver to take advantage of his speed, making 12 receptions (fourth on the team) for 258 yards (second on the team), a 21.5-yard average (led the team) and 2 receiving touchdowns (second on the team).

As a sophomore, he was limited with a sprained ankle and only appeared in 8 games. He totaled 9 receptions for 153 yards and no touchdowns.

As a junior, he was named a starter at wide receiver, as part of an offense that was focused on the running production of Emmitt Smith. He collected 19 receptions (second on the team) for 404 yards (led the team), a 21.3-yard average (led the team) and 3 receiving touchdowns (led the team).

As a senior, he was named one of the captains of Spurrier's first Gators squad, that would finish with a 9–2 overall win–loss record (6–1 in the SEC). He tied tight end Kirk Kirkpatrick for the team lead with 770 yards receiving, while also making 41 receptions (second on the team), 10 receiving touchdowns (led the team). Memorably, he caught a 70-yard pass thrown by quarterback Shane Matthews from the Gators' own 2-yard-line, setting up a crucial field goal in the Gators' 17–13 victory over the Alabama Crimson Tide.

Mills graduated from the University of Florida with a bachelor's degree in exercise and sport sciences in 1990.

== Professional career ==
=== Pittsburgh Steelers ===
Mills was selected by the Pittsburgh Steelers in the third round (73rd overall) of the 1991 NFL draft. As a rookie, he was a backup wide receiver, compiling 3 receptions for 79 yards and 15 special teams tackles (led the team). He scored his first touchdown, after recovering a New England Patriots punt.

In 1992, he registered 30 receptions for 383 yards, 3 receiving touchdowns (tied for the team lead) and 10 special teams tackles. He had 4 receptions for 61 yards against the Houston Oilers. He made 8 receptions for 93 yards in the divisional playoff game against the Buffalo Bills.

In 1993, he tallied 29 receptions for 329 yards, one receiving touchdown and 3 carries for 12 yards. He missed the season finale against the Cleveland Browns with a sprained knee. He had 6 receptions for 84 yards against the Houston Oilers. He made 4 receptions for 60 yards and one touchdown in the Wild Card playoff game against the Kansas City Chiefs.

In 1994, he collected 19 receptions for 384 yards and one receiving touchdown. He missed the second game against the Cleveland Browns with a hamstring injury. He had 3 receptions for 98 yards against the Miami Dolphins. Mills increased his production in the playoffs, beginning with 5 receptions for 117 yards in the divisional playoff game against the Cleveland Browns. He had 8 receptions for 106 yards in the AFC Championship game against the San Diego Chargers.

In 1995, he had his best NFL season, catching 39 passes for 679 yards (13.4-yard avg.), 8 touchdowns and 2,024 all-purpose yards. He set franchise records with 54 kickoff returns for 1,306 yards. He had 5 receptions for 66 yards and one touchdown against the Buffalo Bills. He made 3 receptions for 52 yards, including setting up the game winning touchdown with 1:38 minutes remaining in the AFC Championship Game against the Indianapolis Colts. He was the game's leading receiver in Super Bowl XXX with 8 catches for 79 yards, before tearing his left anterior cruciate ligament in the fourth quarter.

In 1996, he only played in 9 games, while recovering from the torn anterior cruciate ligament he suffered in Super Bowl XXX. He began the season on the Physically Unable to Perform List and returned to practice on October 9. His first game came in Week 9 against the Atlanta Falcons. He collected 7 receptions for 92 receiving yards and one touchdown.

=== Carolina Panthers ===
On March 4, 1997, he signed as a free agent with the Carolina Panthers. He had a disappointing season, playing in just 10 games (5 starts), while collecting 11 receptions for 127 yards and one touchdown. He was declared inactive in 6 games. He had 5 receptions and 66 yards against the Los Angeles Rams. He was released on February 9, 1998.

=== Dallas Cowboys ===
On February 26, 1998, he signed as a free agent with the Dallas Cowboys, reuniting with head coach Chan Gailey who was his offensive coordinator with the Steelers. His understanding of the offense allowed him to be named the team's third receiver behind Michael Irvin and Billy Davis. He registered 28 receptions for 479 yards and 4 receiving touchdowns (led the team). He had his first career regular-season 100-yard game against the Carolina Panthers, making 5 receptions for 110 yards and one touchdown. He suffered a lacerated small intestine in the eleventh game of the season, on a hit by the Seahawks Fred Thomas. The injury caused him to miss the last 5 games and a total of six months.

In 1999, he was the third receiver behind Michael Irvin and Rocket Ismail, but suffered a quad muscle injury that forced him to miss the last 5 games and the playoffs. He finished the season as the team's fourth leading receiver with 30 receptions for 325 yards. He was released on April 4, 2000.

Mills finished his nine-year NFL career with 196 receptions for 2,934 yards, 20 receiving touchdowns and 80 kickoff returns for 1,818 yards.

== NFL career statistics ==
Legend
**Bold**	Career high

=== Regular season ===
Year	Team	Games		Receiving				
Year	Team	GP	GS	Rec	Yds	Avg	Lng	TD
1991	PIT	**16**	2	3	79	**26.3**	35	1
1992	PIT	**16**	5	30	383	12.8	22	3
1993	PIT	14	5	29	386	13.3	30	1
1994	PIT	15	6	19	384	20.2	43	1
1995	PIT	**16**	6	**39**	**679**	17.4	**62**	**8**
1996	PIT	9	3	7	92	13.1	22	1
1997	CAR	10	5	11	127	11.5	37	1
1998	DAL	11	1	28	479	17.1	43	4
1999	DAL	11	**7**	30	325	10.8	36	0
		118	40	196	2,934	15.0	62	20

=== Playoffs ===
Year	Team	Games		Receiving				
Year	Team	GP	GS	Rec	Yds	Avg	Lng	TD
1992	PIT	1	1	8	93	11.6	20	0
1993	PIT	1	0	4	60	15.0	26	**1**
1994	PIT	2	2	13	**223**	**17.2**	**50**	0
1995	PIT	**3**	**3**	**16**	196	12.3	37	**1**
1996	PIT	2	0	2	15	7.5	8	0
		9	6	43	587	13.7	50	2

== Personal life ==
From 2007 to 2012, Mills was the wide receivers coach for the Jacksonville University football team. From 2013 to 2015, he was the wide receivers coach at Florida A&M University. His cousin Ricky Easmon played cornerback in the NFL.

== See also ==
- Florida Gators football, 1980–89
- Florida Gators football, 1990–99
- List of Carolina Panthers players
- List of Dallas Cowboys players
- List of Florida Gators in the NFL draft
- List of Pittsburgh Steelers players
- List of University of Florida alumni
