= XXX: State of the Union =

2005 American film by Lee Tamahori

- Theatrical release poster
- Directed by: Lee Tamahori
- Written by: Simon Kinberg
- Based on: Characters by Rich Wilkes
- Produced by: Neal H. Moritz; Arne L. Schmidt
- Starring: Ice Cube; Willem Dafoe; Scott Speedman; Peter Strauss
- Cinematography: David Tattersall
- Edited by: Mark Goldblatt; Steven Rosenblum; Todd E. Miller
- Music by: Marco Beltrami
- Production companies: Columbia Pictures; Revolution Studios; Original Film
- Distributed by: Sony Pictures Releasing
- Release date: April 29, 2005
- Running time: 101 minutes
- Country: United States
- Language: English
- Budget: $60 million
- Box office: $71.1 million

XXX: State of the Union (released as xXx^{2}: The Next Level and XXX: State of Emergency outside North America) is a 2005 American action spy film directed by Lee Tamahori and a sequel to the 2002 film XXX. It is the second installment of the XXX film series, and was produced by Revolution Studios for Columbia Pictures.

Vin Diesel and Rob Cohen, the lead actor and director of the original, had signed on to a sequel before the first film had opened, but both dropped out over scripting issues, while Cohen worked on Stealth, he remained on as an executive producer. Ice Cube took over the lead role as the new Triple X agent and Tamahori was brought in to direct, following the huge commercial success of the James Bond film Die Another Day, which he directed. Two different scripts were prepared for the film, and the one written by Simon Kinberg was selected; the other script featured a radically different plot.

Released on April 29, 2005, State of the Union is the last film in the XXX film series to be distributed by Columbia Pictures, as Paramount Pictures became the distributor for its future films, starting with XXX: Return of Xander Cage in 2017.

== Plot ==
In Virginia, assailants breach an underground NSA bunker run by Agent Augustus Gibbons, who fends off the attackers before barely escaping with Toby Shavers. To find help from a XXX with more attitude, Gibbons meets his former comrade, Darius Stone, a former U.S. Navy SEAL, who is currently serving 20-years sentence in Leavenworth for disobeying orders and breaking the jaw of ex-four star General George Deckert, who is now the Secretary of Defence. NSA Agent Kyle Steele was informed that Xander Cage was apparently killed at the same time in Bora Bora and is leading the investigation into the attack on the bunker.

Gibbons helps Stone escape out of prison, who then sets himself up as their leader as he mistrusts Gibbons. Stone leads them to meet Zeke, his old partner in crime, and Lola Jackson, his ex-girlfriend, who now runs an exotic car shop. Lola agrees to let Stone, Gibbons, and Shavers hide in her shop in exchange for the '67 GTO that Shavers modified. Stone then infiltrates the NSA bunker, where Gibbons had instructed him to recover a hard drive, while Gibbons returns to his house to recover evidence. However, Deckert and Sergeant Alabama "Bama" Cobb attack and apparently kill Gibbons before bombing and burning the house to cover up the evidence. Stone meets with Gibbons' contact, Charlie Mayweather, to get information. Charlie directs Stone to a party where Stone recognizes that Deckert's bodyguards are members of his old SEAL Team unit before overhearing Deckert arguing with General Jack Pettibone VCJCS. Stone goes to Charlie's safe house but is framed for murdering Pettibone, realizing that she is involved in the conspiracy.

The police arrive, and Steele arrives to talk with Stone before escaping. While Shavers hacks into the Pentagon to retrieve Deckert's plans, Steele researches Stone and discovers his imprisonment occurred because when Deckert ordered his SEAL team to start a fire to clear civilians, Stone and half of the unit rebelled, resulting in Stone being court-martialled. Stone infiltrates Deckert's troops aboard an aircraft carrier and discovers Gibbons alive, being held prisoner along with the rest of their SEAL team unit. Stone realizes that the men who sided with him against Deckert are prisoners, while those who stayed loyal are Deckert's security. Mayweather is alerted to Stone's presence, forcing Stone to escape.

After retrieving the plans, Stone learns that Deckert is planning a coup against President James Sanford. Stone contacts Steele and shows him the plans. When Steele notes that his plans are not clear proof, Stone frustratingly leaves, to Steele's initial disbelief. During a conversation with Deckert, Steele realizes Stone was right. He finds Stone and tells him that Deckert wants to kill Sanford and his successors so he can replace Sanford as president, in opposition to Sanford's current plans to dismantle various military presences to focus on foreign aid.

Stone, Steele, and Shavers enlist the aid of Zeke and his crew. Together, they rob a civilian truck that is secretly hauling guns and equipment for the Department of Homeland Security while disguised as a cheese truck. They end up hijacking a tank, and Stone helps Steele penetrate the Capitol building where Sanford's State of the Union Address is being held. A shootout starts, and Gibbons kills Mayweather. Deckert and Cobb abduct Sanford, and with Gibbons now free, they escape on a bullet train. Lola arrives with a Ford Shelby Cobra Concept, which Stone uses to chase and infiltrate the train. He kills Cobb before engaging Deckert, while Gibbons flies a helicopter Steele uses to extract Sanford. Stone jumps out as Gibbons derails and destroys the train, killing Deckert.

The story is covered up, and Deckert is buried and branded a hero. Sanford awards Steele and the unknown soldier (Stone) the Medal of Honor. Stone is officially released from prison, and he says his goodbyes and returns to his former lifestyle. In the now-rebuilt NSA Headquarters, Gibbons, Steele, and Shavers discuss potential qualities for the next Triple X agent.

== Cast ==
- Ice Cube as Darius Stone
- Samuel L. Jackson as Augustus Gibbons
- Willem Dafoe as George Deckert, U.S Secretary of Defence
- Scott Speedman as Kyle Steele, NSA Agent
- Peter Strauss as President James Sanford
- Xzibit as Zeke
- Michael Roof as Toby Lee Shavers, NSA Agent
- Sunny Mabrey as Charlie Mayweather
- Nona Gaye as Lola Jackson
- Bruce Bruce as passenger in truck
- John G. Connolly as Alabama Cobb
- Ramon De Ocampo as NSA Agent Meadows
- Paul Collins as NSA Director Bill Brody

== Soundtrack ==
A soundtrack containing hip hop and alternative rock was released on April 26, 2005, through Jive Records. It peaked at #117 on the Billboard 200, #48 on the Top R&B/Hip-Hop Albums chart, and #5 on the Top Soundtracks chart.

== Reception ==
=== Box office ===
XXX: State of the Union grossed $26.9 million in the United States and Canada and $44.2 million in other territories, for a worldwide total of $71.1 million, against a reported production budget of $60 million. According to The Wrap.com the production budget was a reported $87 million, but Revolution Studios spent a total of $113.1 million.

It opened on April 29, 2005, and grossed $12.7 million in its opening weekend, finishing third at the box office behind The Hitchhiker's Guide to the Galaxy and The Interpreter.

=== Critical response ===
On Rotten Tomatoes the film has an approval rating of 17%, based on 138 reviews. The site's critical consensus reads, "Even more absurd and implausible than the first xXx movie, State of the Union is less inspired and technically competent than its predecessor." On Metacritic, the film has a score of 37%, based on reviews from 31 critics, indicating "generally unfavorable reviews". Audiences surveyed by CinemaScore gave the film a grade B+ on scale of A to F.

Boo Allen of the Denton Record Chronicle called Ice Cube's XXX character "a chubby, surly, incomprehensible action hero". Jack Mathews of New York Daily Times gave the film a scoring of one out of four, explaining that "the chases, shootouts and explosions in this deafening, lamebrained wreck of a movie make the Road Runner cartoons look like National Geographic specials". Brian Orndorf of FilmJerk.com compared watching the film to running "headfirst at top speed into a brick wall". David Hiltbrand of the Philadelphia Inquirer said "the plot swings between pathetically implausible and aggressively stupid". Some critics liked the film. Mack Bates of the Milwaukee Journal Sentinel praised Ice Cube's "trademark charisma and street sensibility," while Owen Gleiberman of Entertainment Weekly called it "that rare B movie that's rooted in gut-level stirrings of power and retaliation". Phil Villarreal of Arizona Daily Star gave it a three out of four scoring, stating that "the movie appears to have employed a Super Nintendo as its screenwriter, and it boasts all the elegance and character development of a Transformers episode." Paul Arendt of the BBC said, "Viewed on its own trashy terms, it succeeds brilliantly".
