= Ricky Easmon =

American football player (born 1963)

No. 42, 26
- Position: Cornerback

Personal information
- Born: April 3, 1963 (age 63); Inverness, Florida, U.S.
- Listed height: 5 ft 10 in (1.78 m)
- Listed weight: 158 lb (72 kg)

Career information
- High school: Dunnellon (FL)
- College: Florida
- NFL draft: 1985: undrafted

Career history
- Dallas Cowboys (1985); Tampa Bay Buccaneers (1985–1987)

Career NFL statistics
- Games played: 23
- Stats at Pro Football Reference

Charles Richard Easmon (born July 3, 1963) is an American former professional football player who was a cornerback in the National Football League (NFL) for the Dallas Cowboys and Tampa Bay Buccaneers. He played college football for the Florida Gators.

== Early life ==
Easmon attended Dunnellon High School, where he played quarterback. He was a part of two teams that won the Class 2A state championship. He received All-state honors as a senior.

He accepted a football scholarship from the University of Florida, with the intention of being converted into a wide receiver or cornerback. He started at cornerback in his last 3 seasons. As a senior, he had 49 tackles and 4 interceptions (led the team).

== Professional career ==
Easmon was signed as an undrafted free agent by the Dallas Cowboys after the 1985 NFL draft. He was waived on September 2. He was re-signed on September 11. He was released on November 9, to make room to activate safety Vince Albritton.

On November 12, 1985, he was claimed off waivers by the Tampa Bay Buccaneers to replace veteran Carl Howard. He played on special teams and as a nickel back. In 1986, he was limited with a thigh injury. He was activated on December 20.

On September 7, 1987, he was placed on the injured reserve list with a knee injury. He wasn't re-signed after the season.

== Personal life ==
His cousin Ernie Mills played wide receiver in the NFL and in the University of Florida.
