= XXX (2002 film) =

American action film directed by Rob Cohen

- Theatrical release poster
- Directed by: Rob Cohen
- Written by: Rich Wilkes
- Produced by: Neal H. Moritz
- Starring: Vin Diesel; Asia Argento; Marton Csokas
- Cinematography: Dean Semler
- Edited by: Chris Lebenzon; Paul Rubell; Joel Negron
- Music by: Randy Edelman
- Production companies: Columbia Pictures; Revolution Studios
- Distributed by: Sony Pictures Releasing
- Release date: August 9, 2002
- Running time: 124 minutes
- Country: United States
- Language: English
- Budget: $88.3 million
- Box office: $277.4 million

XXX (stylized as xXx and pronounced Triple X) is a 2002 American action thriller film starring Vin Diesel as Xander Cage, a thrill-seeking extreme sports enthusiast, stuntman, and rebellious athlete-turned-reluctant spy for the National Security Agency who is sent on a dangerous mission to infiltrate a group of potential Russian terrorists in Central Europe. The first installment in the XXX film series, the film was directed by Rob Cohen, produced by Neal H. Moritz and written by Rich Wilkes. The film also stars Asia Argento, and Marton Csokas.

Cohen, Moritz, and Diesel had previously worked on The Fast and the Furious (2001) as director, producer and cast member respectively. The film was released by Sony Pictures Releasing on August 9, 2002, and grossed $277.4 million worldwide and was followed by two sequels, xXx: State of the Union (2005) and xXx: Return of Xander Cage (2017).

== Plot ==
Russian terrorist group Anarchy 99 acquires the biochemical weapon "Silent Night", presumed missing since the dissolution of the Soviet Union. Undercover NSA agent Jim McGrath is assigned to recover the weapon, but is killed by Anarchy 99 at a Rammstein concert.

NSA Agent Augustus Gibbons suggests sending Xander "XXX" Cage, an extreme sports professional wanted for unlawful protesting, citing his lack of ties to the United States government. Under Gibbons' supervision, Cage passes two tests, one involving stopping a fake armed robbery, and another where he and two other potential candidates are dropped into Colombia where they're thrown into an actual conflict between the Cartel and the Colombian Army. Xander was given the options to take a job or go to prison, in which Xander reluctantly accepts the contract.

In Prague, Cage meets his team, which includes his supervisor, Czech agent Milan Sova. While scouting an Anarchy 99 party, Cage identifies Sova as a police officer, earning him favor with the group and catching the attention of the leader Yorgi. Cage asks Yorgi about purchasing high end sports cars, and Yorgi's girlfriend and lieutenant Yelena, gives Cage an account number.

Gibbons calls Cage about changes to the plan, but is impressed when he gives them information provided by Kolya, Yorgi's star-struck younger brother. Tech-specialist Agent Toby Shavers then provides Cage with gadgets, including a revolver with special ammunition, binoculars that can see through walls and explosives disguised as bandages.

As Cage attends the car deal he made with Yorgi, Sova attempts to intercede. Using the special ammunition, Cage fakes Sova's death. Having earned Yorgi's trust, Cage joins Anarchy 99. After a dance party at one of his nightclubs, Yorgi brings Cage back to a castle that serves as Anarchy 99's headquarters. Cage, while searching for the biochemical weapon, catches Yelena investigating Yorgi's secret safe. He takes her to a nearby restaurant to discuss the matter and reveals his true identity.

Sova betrays Cage to Yorgi, so he sends his trusted sniper Kirill to kill him. While watching the pair, Kirill, who is in love with Yelena, warns her. As Cage and Yelena stage a fight, the NSA suddenly appears to capture him, and Yelena is taken back to Anarchy 99.

Cage meets with Gibbons, who demands he return to America, as his cover is blown and special forces are planning to assault the castle. He refuses, fearing for Yelena's life and bitter that Sova blew his cover. Cage sneaks into Yorgi's castle and follows him into a secret underground laboratory. Overhearing his plan to launch "Silent Night" from the water-borne drone Ahab; he first tests the weapon on the scientists who developed it, to Cage and Yelena's horror. Cage flees the area after killing Kolya. At his hideout, Sova is waiting for him, now with Yorgi. Yelena saves Cage, revealing herself to be an abandoned undercover Russian Federal Security Service agent. Cage relays Yorgi's plans to the NSA in return for Yelena's asylum.

Against orders, Shavers heavily arms Cage's car, who then parachutes from a plane on a snowboard near Anarchy 99's communication tower. The avalanche he starts destroys the tower, but he is captured by Yorgi, who already knew Yelena's true identity. As Yorgi prepares to kill them, the special forces attack. Cage and Yelena free themselves, but Yorgi launches Ahab before Cage kills him. The Czech military prepares to destroy Ahab with airstrikes, though this will release some of the biochemical agent. Cage and Yelena take his heavily modified car, to catch up to Ahab. Cage harpoons and disables the weapon moments before it goes off.

Cage and Yelena are recovered, and Gibbons follows through on his promises. Sometime later, the couple is relaxing in Bora Bora when Gibbons contacts him for another mission, but Cage ignores him.

== Cast ==
- Vin Diesel as Xander "XXX" Cage, a thrill-seeking American extreme sports enthusiast, stuntman, and anti-establishment activist. Idolized in some sub-cultures, Cage is also hunted by the authorities and he is offered a deal to become a spy for the National Security Agency in exchange for leniency, the agency requiring an agent who can do the current job without the military professional training that Anarchy 99's background will allow them to recognise.
- Samuel L. Jackson as Augustus Gibbons, a high-ranking official in the National Security Agency who has the power to give Cage a pardon for his crimes. He uses this fact as leverage to recruit Cage for a mission because he knows Cage is the only person who could successfully infiltrate Anarchy 99, recognising the benefits of Cage's rebellious attitude and unorthodox methods.
- William Hope as Roger Donnan, the associate and administrator of the National Security Agency.
- Danny Trejo as "El Jefe", a torturer for a Colombian drug cartel.
- Asia Argento as Yelena, Yorgi's apparent girlfriend. Originally a Russian intelligence agent, sent to watch over Yorgi but has since been abandoned by her superiors. Yelena becomes romantically involved with Cage and he attempts to get her political asylum in the United States for her assistance in bringing down Yorgi.
- Marton Csokas as Yorgi, a former soldier in the Soviet Army, now a wealthy hedonist owning a string of properties around Eastern Europe, including a castle and nightclubs. Yorgi is also the leader of Anarchy 99, a group of militant anarchists with a disdain for all forms of government and authority, and society in general. His ultimate aim is complete lawlessness across the world.
- Michael Roof as Toby Lee Shavers, an NSA techno-genius and gadget specialist.
- Richy Müller as Milan Sova, a cop and double agent.
- Werner Daehn as Kirill, a member of Anarchy 99, cigarette addict and sharpshooter.
- Petr Jákl as Kolya, Yorgi's younger brother.
- Jan Pavel Filipensky as Viktor, a member of Anarchy 99 and close friend of Yorgi. He is usually with Yorgi wherever he goes.
- Tom Everett as Dick Hotchkiss, a conservative California State Senator; his car is stolen and wrecked by Cage prior to his recruitment by the NSA, as a protest against some of Hotchkiss's policies.
- Thomas Ian Griffith as Jim McGrath, an undercover agent killed by Anarchy 99 while trying to retrieve the Silent Night weapon.
- Eve as J.J., Xander's friend
- Leila Arcieri as Jordan King
- Rammstein as themselves
- Orbital as themselves

To imply Xander Cage's credibility within extreme sport subcultures, various personalities make cameo appearances:

- Tony Hawk makes a cameo appearance in the Corvette scene from the bottom of the bridge driving the getaway Cadillac, (near the beginning of the film) and skating over a half-pipe at Xander's place later.
- Mike Vallely also makes a cameo as a cameraman and an extra. Pro motocross rider Carey Hart is seen in the back seat of the Cadillac driven by Tony Hawk.
- BMX rider Mat Hoffman exchanges lines with Xander during the party scene.
- Also during the party scene, Josh Todd (the lead singer of Buckcherry) makes a cameo appearance though he never turns around, but his suicide king of hearts tattoo can be seen on his back.

== Production ==
In July 2001, it was announced that Vin Diesel would receive in the neighborhood of $10 million to star in the film, with an initial release date of July 26, 2002. It is believed that before Diesel was cast, Eric Bana turned down the lead role of Xander Cage. In August 2001, Sony put up a large billboard advertising the film in Hollywood, before a script had been written.

Filming took place at three locations. Most of the film is set in Prague, Czech Republic. The Corvette jump was filmed at the Foresthill Bridge in Auburn State Recreation Area, Auburn, California. The final scenes were set in Bora Bora, Tahiti, and other areas in southern West Virginia.

Several Czech Su-22s were used for the film. It was one of the last actions of these aircraft – the Czech Air Force decommissioned Sukhois in 2002.

Vin Diesel did many of his own stunts, director Rob Cohen said: "I think the thing is that Vin did more than he should have, but less than he wanted to." Diesel took a fall during the avalanche scene, and landed head first and wasn't moving, and Cohen was worried the star of the film might have broken his neck. A scene where Cage base jumps from a Corvette was performed by Tim Rigby wearing a Vin Diesel mask. The motorcycle jump was performed by professional motocross rider and stuntman Jeremy Stenberg, and Diesel's face was later added digitally.

Stunt player Harry O'Connor, Diesel's stunt double, was killed on April 4, 2002, when he hit a pillar of the Palacký Bridge in Prague while para-sailing during one of the action scenes. The accident occurred while filming the second take of the stunt; O'Connor's first attempt was completed without incident and can be seen in the completed film, which was dedicated to him.

The first few minutes of the film take place at a concert of German Neue Deutsche Härte band Rammstein in Prague, performing the song "Feuer Frei". The same clip is available, but from the band's perspective (with only brief scenes from the film) in their video compilation Lichtspielhaus.

== Music ==
The film score was composed by Randy Edelman, a frequent collaborator of Cohen's. The film also featured a contemporary rock music soundtrack. Rammstein provided some of the music and was even featured in the film in the opening scene. During the club scene in Prague, Orbital can be seen playing their exclusive track "Technologicque Park" live before the dancing crowd. The soundtrack album also features Queens of the Stone Age, Drowning Pool, Flaw, Mushroomhead, Hatebreed, Nelly, Lil Wayne, N.E.R.D, Fermín IV and Moby. It was released on August 6, 2002, through Universal Records. It peaked at No. 9 on the Billboard 200, No. 16 on the Top R&B/Hip-Hop Albums and No. 1 on the Top Soundtracks. The "Tweaker remix" of the song "Adrenaline" by Gavin Rossdale (the lead singer of Bush) was featured in the film, while the original version is included on the soundtrack. None of Edelman's score was included on the album, with a separate disc of his work released by Varèse Sarabande.

== Reception ==
=== Box office ===
XXX opened in 3,374 theaters and grossed $44,506,103 in its opening weekend, placing it at #1 ahead of previous holdover Signs ($29.4 million) and fellow newcomer Spy Kids 2: Island of Lost Dreams ($16.7 million). The opening marked the fourth-highest August debut at the time, behind American Pie 2, Rush Hour 2 (both 2001), and Signs. It held on to the top spot on its second weekend with an additional $22,111,421. By the end of its box office run, the film grossed a total of $142,109,382, and a further $135,339,000 internationally for a worldwide total of $277,448,382, against its production budget of $70–88.3 million. It is the 14th highest-grossing film of 2002.

=== Critical response ===
On Rotten Tomatoes, the film has an approval rating of 48% based on reviews from 180 critics, with an average rating of 5.59/10. The site's consensus reads: "It has an endearing lack of seriousness, and Vin Diesel has more than enough muscle for the starring role, but ultimately, XXX is a missed opportunity to breathe new life into the spy thriller genre." On Metacritic, the film has a score of 48 out of 100, based on reviews from 33 critics, indicating "mixed or average reviews". Audiences surveyed by CinemaScore gave the film a grade A− on scale of A to F.

Roger Ebert of the Chicago Sun-Times gave it 3 1/2 stars out of 4, writing, "In its own punk way, XXX is as good as a good Bond movie, and that's saying something." Peter Travers of Rolling Stone wrote: "It's hard to hate a movie, even one this droolingly crass, that knows how to laugh at itself." Adam Smith of Empire called the movie, "Sporadically entertaining, but seriously hampered by a very choppy screenplay", and rating it three out of five stars.

This film was nominated for a Razzie Award for Most Flatulent Teen-Targeted Movie, but lost to Jackass: The Movie.

== See also ==
- XXX (video game)
