= Terrence Brooks =

American football player (born 1992)

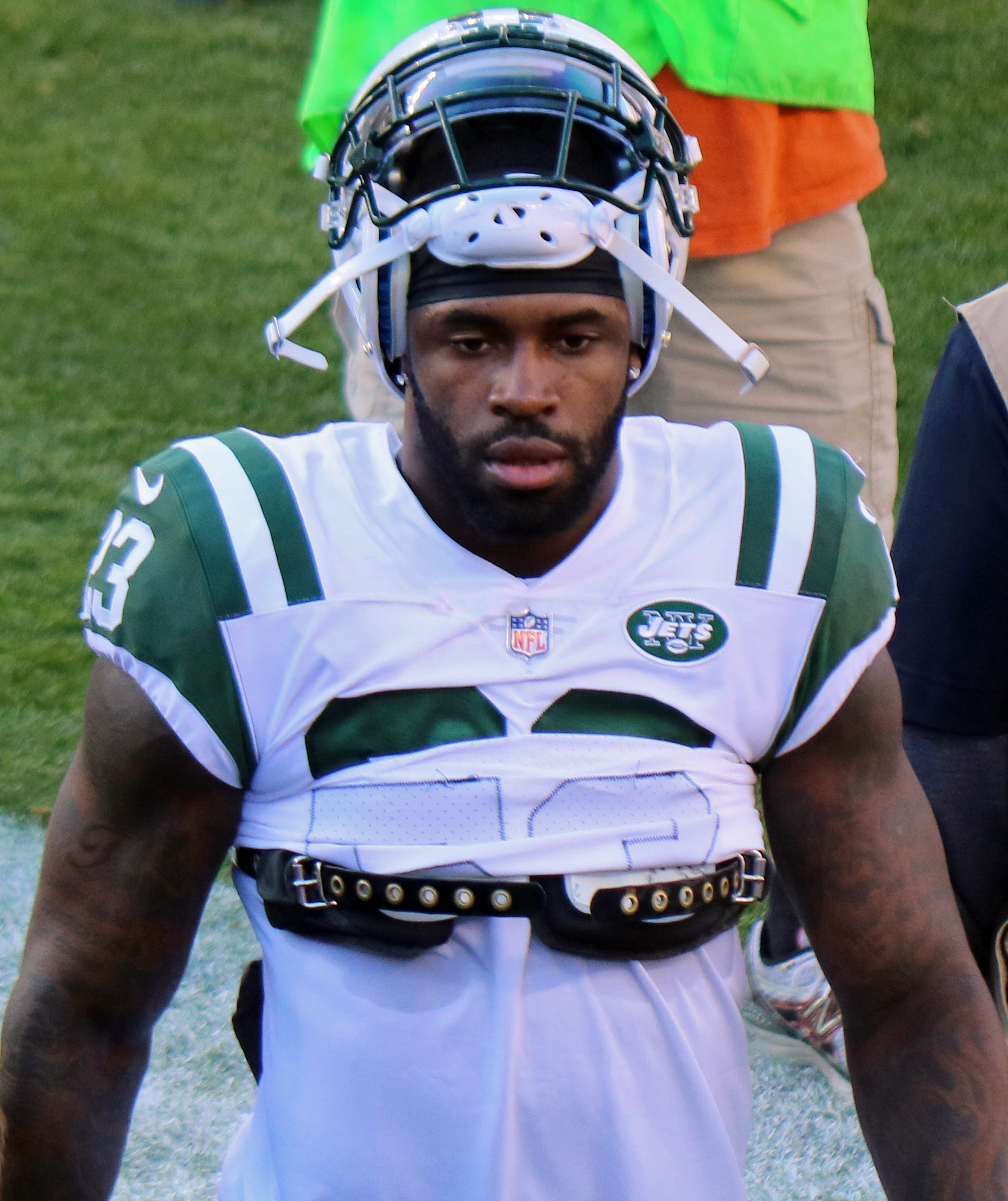
- Brooks with the New York Jets in 2017

No. 31, 29, 23, 25, 8
- Position: Safety

Personal information
- Born: March 2, 1992 (age 34); Dunnellon, Florida, U.S.
- Listed height: 5 ft 11 in (1.80 m)
- Listed weight: 205 lb (93 kg)

Career information
- High school: Dunnellon
- College: Florida State
- NFL draft: 2014: 3rd round, 79th overall pick

Career history
- Baltimore Ravens (2014–2015); Philadelphia Eagles (2016); New York Jets (2017–2018); New England Patriots (2019–2020); Houston Texans (2021)

Awards and highlights
- BCS national champion (2013); First-team All-American (2013); First-team All-ACC (2013)

Career NFL statistics
- Total tackles: 123
- Forced fumbles: 2
- Fumble recoveries: 2
- Pass deflections: 12
- Interceptions: 4
- Stats at Pro Football Reference

Terrence Brooks (born March 2, 1992) is an American former professional football player who was a safety in the National Football League (NFL). He played college football for the Florida State Seminoles and was selected by the Baltimore Ravens in the third round of the 2014 NFL draft.

== Early life ==
A native of Dunnellon, Florida, Brooks attended Dunnellon High School where he rushed for 500 yards and recorded 53 tackles, six interceptions, and three pass breakups during his junior season.

Considered a three-star recruit by ESPN.com, Brooks was listed as the No. 21 cornerback prospect of his class. He accepted a scholarship offer from Florida State over offers from Mississippi and South Florida.

== College career ==
As a senior at Florida State University in 2013, Brooks was a first-team All-Atlantic Coast Conference (ACC) selection and was an All-American by CBSSports.com.

== Professional career ==
Pre-draft measurables
Height	Weight	Arm length	Hand span	Wingspan	40-yard dash	10-yard split	20-yard split	20-yard shuttle	Three-cone drill	Vertical jump	Broad jump	Bench press	Wonderlic
5 ft 10 7/8 in (1.80 m)	198 lb (90 kg)	31 in (0.79 m)	9 in (0.23 m)	6 ft 3 in (1.91 m)	4.42 s	1.54 s	2.59 s	4.56 s	7.01 s	38 in (0.97 m)	10 ft 2 in (3.10 m)	11 reps	23
All values from NFL Combine/Pro Day

=== Baltimore Ravens ===
The Baltimore Ravens selected Brooks in the third round (79th overall) of the 2014 NFL draft.

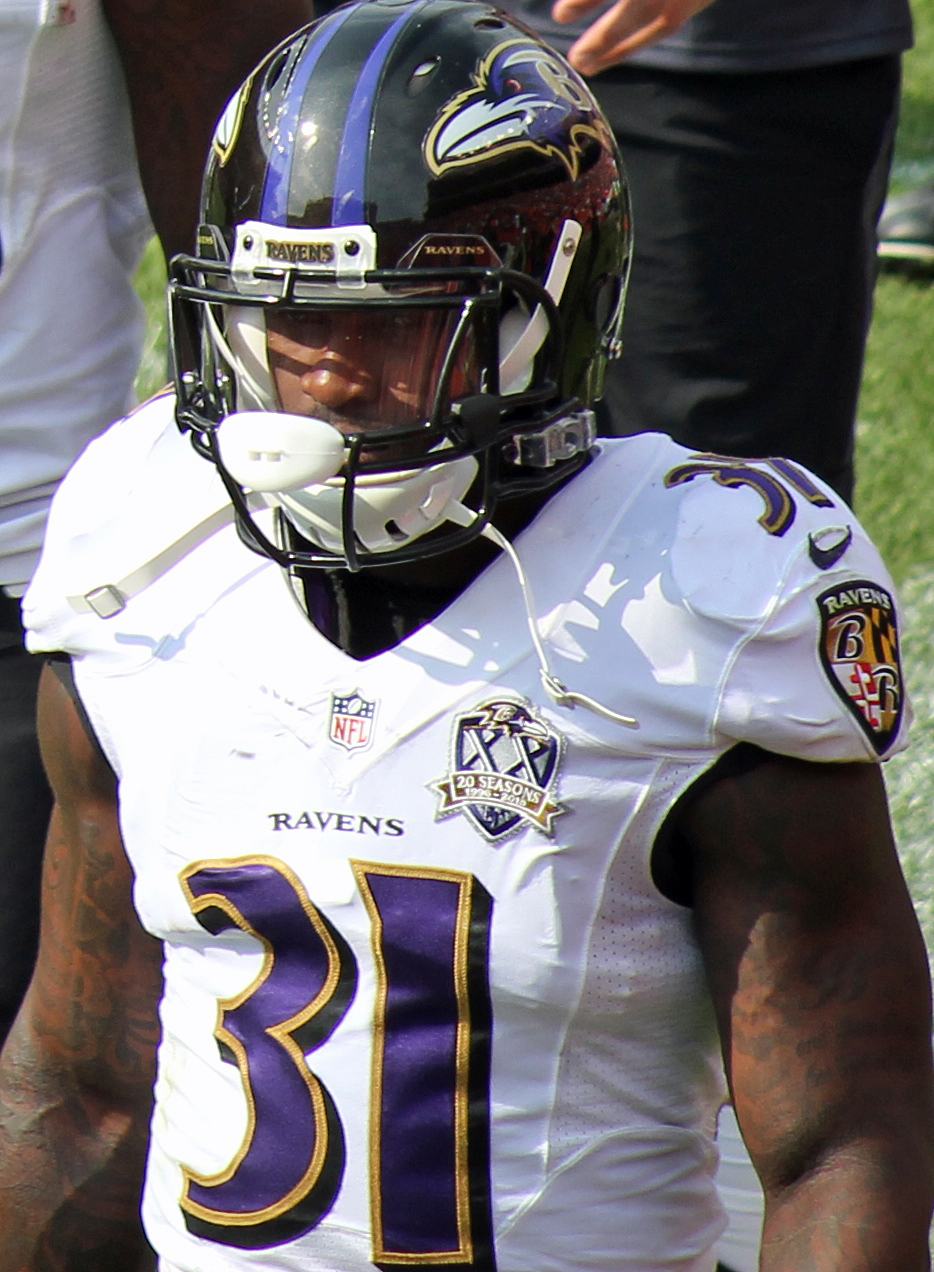
Brooks with the Baltimore Ravens in 2015

On May 30, 2014, he was signed by the Ravens to a four-year contract On December 16, 2014, Brooks was placed on injured reserve, ending his rookie campaign. On September 3, 2016, he was released by the Ravens.

=== Philadelphia Eagles ===
On September 4, 2016, Brooks was claimed off waivers by the Philadelphia Eagles.

=== New York Jets ===
On August 27, 2017, Brooks was traded to the New York Jets in exchange for cornerback Dexter McDougle. In Week 3, Brooks recorded two interceptions, one off quarterback Jay Cutler and the other off Matt Haack, and three passes defensed, helping the Jets earn their first win in a 20–6 victory over the Miami Dolphins, earning him AFC Defensive Player of the Week.

On March 14, 2018, Brooks signed a two-year contract extension with the Jets.

On February 19, 2019, the Jets declined the option on Brooks' contract, making him a free agent at the start of the new league year.

=== New England Patriots ===
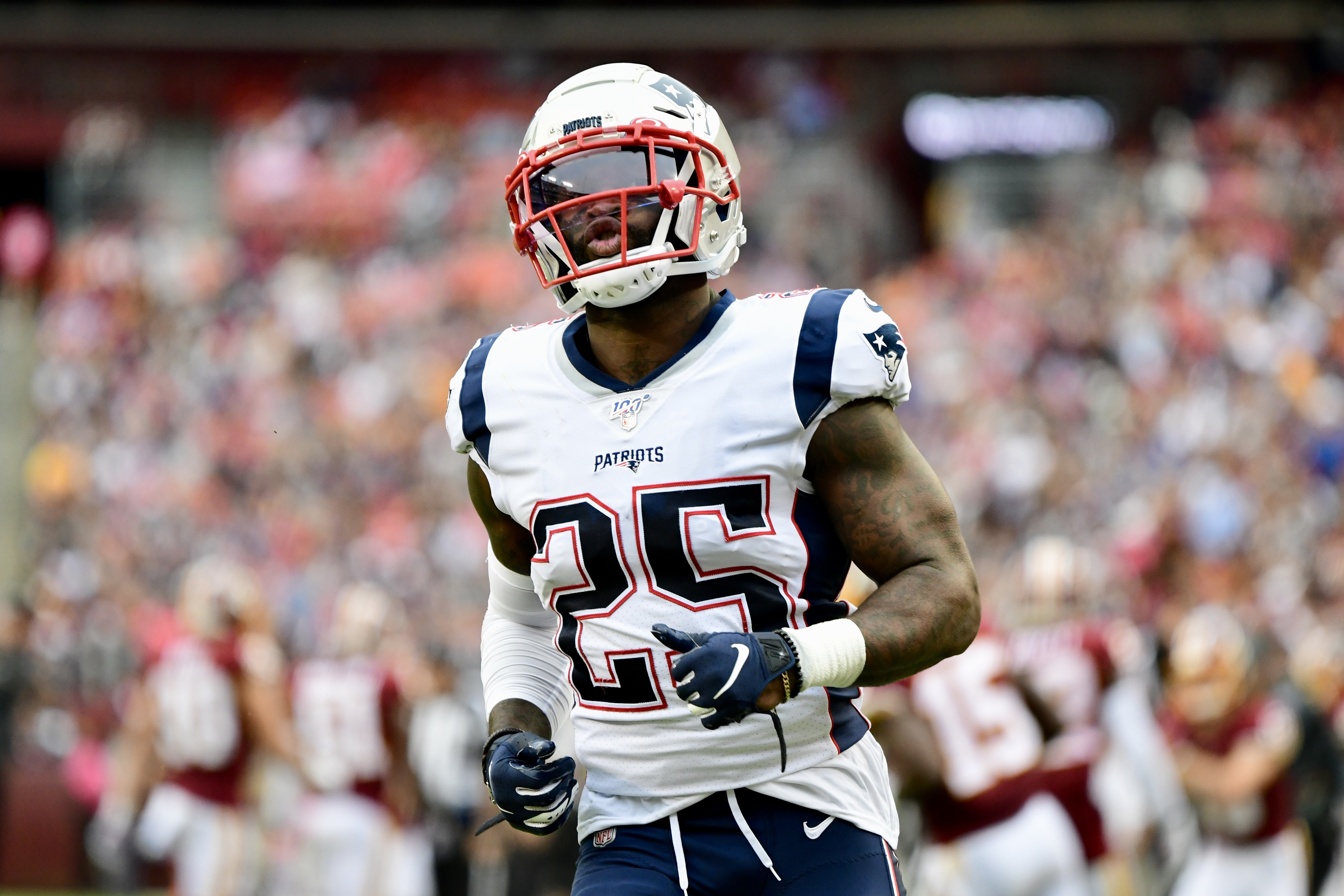
Brooks with the New England Patriots in 2019

On March 14, 2019, Brooks signed a two-year contract with the New England Patriots. In Week 7 against his former team, the Jets, Brooks recorded his first interception of the season off Sam Darnold in the 33–0 win.

=== Houston Texans ===
On March 23, 2021, Brooks signed a one-year contract with the Houston Texans. He was placed on injured reserve on October 21, 2021, with a lung contusion. He was activated on November 20.

On March 29, 2022, Brooks re-signed with the Texans. He was released on August 30, 2022.

== NFL career statistics ==
Legend
**Bold**	Career high

=== Regular season ===
Year	Team	Games		Tackles					Interceptions					Fumbles			
Year	Team	GP	GS	Cmb	Solo	Ast	Sck	TFL	Int	Yds	TD	Lng	PD	FF	FR	Yds	TD
2014	BAL	11	0	19	16	3	0.0	0	0	0	0	0	2	0	**1**	0	0
2015	BAL	12	0	8	7	1	0.0	**1**	0	0	0	0	1	0	0	0	0
2016	PHI	11	0	5	4	1	0.0	0	1	6	0	6	1	**2**	0	0	0
2017	NYJ	15	1	13	10	3	0.0	0	**2**	**13**	0	**13**	**3**	0	0	0	0
2018	NYJ	**16**	0	10	9	1	0.0	**1**	0	0	0	0	1	0	**1**	0	0
2019	NWE	15	0	**24**	**17**	**7**	0.0	0	1	0	0	0	**3**	0	0	0	0
2020	NWE	14	2	23	16	**7**	0.0	0	0	0	0	0	0	0	0	0	0
2021	HOU	11	**3**	21	15	6	0.0	0	0	0	0	0	1	0	0	0	0
Career		105	6	123	94	29	0.0	2	4	19	0	13	12	2	2	0	0

=== Playoffs ===
Year	Team	Games		Tackles					Interceptions					Fumbles			
Year	Team	GP	GS	Cmb	Solo	Ast	Sck	TFL	Int	Yds	TD	Lng	PD	FF	FR	Yds	TD
2019	NWE	**1**	0	**1**	**1**	0	0.0	0	0	0	0	0	0	0	0	0	0
Career		1	0	1	1	0	0.0	0	0	0	0	0	0	0	0	0	0
