= Michael Roof =

American actor and comedian (1976–2009)

- Born: November 24, 1976; MacDill AFB, Florida, U.S.
- Died: June 9, 2009 (aged 32); Snellville, Georgia, U.S.
- Occupations: Actor; comedian
- Years active: 2000–2006

Michael Roof, also known by his stage name Chicken (November 24, 1976 – June 9, 2009), was an American actor and comedian.

== Early life ==
Roof was born on November 24, 1976, at a U.S. Air Force hospital at MacDill Air Force Base in Tampa, Florida, to Jean and Michael Roof Sr. He had two brothers and two sisters. Roof attended Reese AFB Elementary, in Lubbock, Texas, then Frenship Intermediate and Frenship Jr. High, in Wolfforth, Texas, just outside Lubbock. While in eighth grade the Roof family moved to Yokota Air Base in Japan.

Roof toured American comedy clubs with a stage name of "Chicken." He was especially popular in college town comedy clubs such as 'Deja Vu' in Columbia, Missouri. Under the stage name Chicken he became an underground sensation, leaving audiences wanting more even when he was the opener. This led him to getting his own headlining spots and a devoted fan base that helped launch his film and TV career.

In 2000, he had a central part in the WB Network sketch comedy TV series Hype, but it was canceled after its first season. After Hype, Roof moved to Hollywood, California to pursue a film career.

He landed a number of film roles in big-budget Hollywood productions. Some of these roles include Private John Maddox of the U.S. Army Rangers in Black Hawk Down, Dil Driscoll in The Dukes of Hazzard, and National Security Agency Agent Toby Lee Shavers in XXX and its sequel XXX: State of the Union. Due to his death, Shavers doesn't appear in the 2017 sequel XXX: Return of Xander Cage; Nina Dobrev took over as Shavers' replacement Becky Clearidge.

In 2006, Roof was given his own Spike Channel reality TV show, Raising the Roofs. The program, which ran for six episodes, followed the misadventures of his self-described "Florida cracker" dad, Michael, Sr., and his uncle, while they visited Roof at his home in Hollywood.

== Personal life and death ==
After his television series Raising the Roofs was cancelled in 2006, Roof moved to Atlanta with his wife, Megan, and their two sons.

In the early morning of June 9, 2009, Roof's wife contacted police and reported him missing. Several hours later, his body was found hanged from a tree in a wooded area near a Snellville, Georgia, elementary school parking lot. Roof reportedly suffered from depression, anxiety, and bipolar disorder, and had been despondent about family finances. He is buried at Dunnellon Memorial Gardens in Dunnellon, Florida.

== Filmography ==
| Year | Title | Role | Notes |
|---|---|---|---|
| 2001 | Black Hawk Down | Maddox | |
| 2002 | XXX | Agent Toby Lee Shavers | |
| 2005 | XXX: State of the Union | Agent Toby Lee Shavers | |
| 2005 | The Dukes of Hazzard | Dil Driscoll | (final film role) |
