= Raising the Roofs =

- Genre: Reality television
- Starring: Michael Roof; Papa Roof; Stevie Roof
- Country of origin: United States
- Original language: English
- No. of seasons: 1
- No. of episodes: 6

Production
- Production location: Los Angeles, California
- Running time: 30 minutes

Original release
- Network: Spike TV
- Release: July 6 – August 10, 2006

Raising the Roofs is a 2006 reality television show on Spike TV, following the life of aspiring actor Michael Roof, and the misadventures of his self described Florida cracker dad and uncle, in Hollywood, California.

== Episode list ==
1. "Home Is Where the Fart Is" – July 6, 2006
2. "Show Me the Hunnies" – July 13, 2006
3. "Money for Nuthin' Hicks for Free" – July 20, 2006
4. "$100 Dollars on Redneck" – July 27, 2006
5. "Bright Lights, Big Boobies" – August 3, 2006
6. "Erection Day" – August 10, 2006
