= XXX: Return of Xander Cage =

2017 American thriller film by D. J. Caruso

- Theatrical release poster
- Directed by: D.J. Caruso
- Written by: F. Scott Frazier
- Based on: Characters by Rich Wilkes
- Produced by: Joe Roth; Jeff Kirschenbaum; Vin Diesel; Samantha Vincent
- Starring: Vin Diesel; Donnie Yen; Deepika Padukone; Kris Wu; Ruby Rose; Tony Jaa; Nina Dobrev; Toni Collette; Samuel L. Jackson
- Cinematography: Russell Carpenter
- Edited by: Jim Page; Vince Filippone
- Music by: Brian Tyler; Robert Lydecker
- Production companies: Paramount Pictures; Revolution Studios; One Race Films; Roth/Kirschenbaum Films
- Distributed by: Paramount Pictures
- Release dates: January 5, 2017 (Mexico City); January 20, 2017 (United States)
- Running time: 107 minutes
- Country: United States
- Language: English
- Budget: $85 million
- Box office: $346.1 million

XXX: Return of Xander Cage (released as XXX: Reactivated in some countries) is a 2017 American action spy film starring Vin Diesel. The third installment in the XXX film series and a sequel to both XXX (2002) and XXX: State of the Union (2005), the film was directed by D.J. Caruso and written by F. Scott Frazier. Donnie Yen, Deepika Padukone, Kris Wu, Ruby Rose, Tony Jaa, Nina Dobrev, Toni Collette, Ariadna Gutiérrez, Hermione Corfield, and Samuel L. Jackson appear in supporting roles.

Released on January 20, 2017, in 2D, RealD 3D and IMAX 3D by Paramount Pictures, the film received mixed reviews from critics but was commercially successful, grossing over $346 million worldwide against a production budget of $85 million and subsequently becoming both the franchise's and Revolution Studios' highest-grossing film.

== Plot ==
In Brazil, a satellite that had fallen out of orbit crashes on NSA Agent Augustus Gibbons who is attempting to recruit footballer Neymar for the Triple-X (xXx) program, seemingly killing them both.

In New York City, Xiang's team infiltrates a CIA office to recover "Pandora's Box", a device that can crash satellites as warheads. CIA Agent Jane Marke finds ex-operative Xander Cage, who faked his death and lives in the Dominican Republic. She persuades Xander to return and retrieve the device.

In London, Xander enlists his old friend Ainsley's help and tracks attackers to the Philippines. At an RAF outpost in Lakenheath, a Special Forces unit led by Paul Donovan is assigned to assist Xander, but he rejects them for his own team: sharpshooter Adele Wolff, DJ Harvard "Nicks" Zhou, getaway driver Tennyson "The Torch," and weapons expert Becky Clearidge.

The team finds Xiang and his teammates Serena, Talon, and Hawk. Xander meets Xiang in an underground nightclub on a remote island, where Xiang reveals that his team are also xXx agents recruited by Gibbons. Xiang says he stole Pandora's Box to prevent misuse, but Serena wanted to destroy it. Russian soldiers then raid the island. The group fights them off, while Xiang escapes with the device. Xander chases him to a nearby beach. Serena betrays Xiang, destroys the Box, and joins Xander, while Xiang escapes to regroup with Talon and Hawk.

After another satellite is crashed into the Olympic Stadium in Moscow, Marke determines that the device Serena destroyed was only a prototype. Xander discovers CIA Director Anderson is involved and possesses the actual Pandora's Box. Xander's and Xiang's teams race to reach Anderson first in Detroit, tracking the unique signal emitted by Pandora's Box, with Xander and Xiang reluctantly cooperating to fight Anderson's men. Xander confronts Anderson, who admits to causing the satellite crash that killed Gibbons, before Wolff shoots him dead. Xander reluctantly allows the CIA to arrest Xiang in an attempt to frame him for the Moscow attack, and they secure the box. En route back to headquarters, Marke announces that the CIA has shuttered the program and shoots Xander to keep it for herself. She then sends a hit squad to eliminate the others to tie up loose ends. They join forces to fend off their attackers, assisted by former xXx operative Darius Stone.

Xander, saved by Becky's bulletproof vest, teams up with Xiang to fight Donovan and his men. Marke uses the box to send a satellite towards the warehouse, aiming to kill both groups. Donovan uses bionic gloves to punch equipment as Xander dodges. In a bathroom fight, Donovan punches the toilet, creating an opening for Xander to eject him. Xiang causes Marke to fall to her death and parachutes out with the box. After Serena reports Becky's failed signal stop, Xander crashes the plane into the satellite to protect everyone, then jumps out and lands safely. Xiang gives him the device, which he destroys by stomping. Darius arrives in Xander's old car, and they introduce themselves.

The team attends Gibbons' funeral, where Gibbons, who faked his death and is rebuilding the program, approaches Xander, now recruiting Neymar. Gibbons compliments Xander, who chooses to stay in service.

== Cast ==
- Vin Diesel as Xander Cage, an extreme athlete turned xXx field agent who was believed to have died.
- Donnie Yen as Xiang, a xXx agent who heads a team trying to secure Pandora's Box
- Deepika Padukone as Serena Unger, formerly supported Xiang
- Kris Wu as Nicks, full name Nicky Zhou, a guy who supports Cage; he is also a DJ nicknamed "The Hood"
- Ruby Rose as Adele Wolff, a main sharpshooter who supports Cage
- Tony Jaa as Talon, supports Xiang
- Nina Dobrev as Becky Clearidge, former assistant of Gibbons and weapons specialist assigned by Marke to provide technical weapons and equipment support to Cage.
- Toni Collette as Jane Marke, CIA agent lead who brings in Cage for the job
- Samuel L. Jackson as Augustus Gibbons, founder of the xXx program and also NSA field agent who originally recruited Cage
- Rory McCann as Tennyson Torch, a getaway driver who supports Cage; he keeps a record of the number of times he drives a vehicle to crash into things (which reaches 200)
- Hermione Corfield as Ainsley, a close ally of Cage who lives in London.
- Tony Gonzalez as Paul Donovan, Special Forces operative working for Marke
- Michael Bisping as Hawk, supports Xiang

Ice Cube reprises his role from State of the Union as xXx agent Darius Stone. Professional footballer Neymar appears as himself. Al Sapienza plays CIA Director Anderson. Nicky Jam plays Lazarus, Ariadna Gutiérrez plays Lola, Shawn Roberts plays Jonas, Daniel Kash plays Russian Spymaster, and Andrey Ivenchko plays Red Erik.

== Production ==
=== Development ===
Following the release of xXx in 2002, director Rob Cohen revealed his plans to make it a franchise, but an "anarchistic" one with different settings in each film, without anyone from the original film returning except Vin Diesel as Xander Cage. Working on a sequel and planning as well a third and fourth film, Cohen had two scripts in development, one taking place in Southeast Asia and involving Malacca strait pirates and the other taking place in Washington, D.C., and involving the United States Secret Service. Diesel explained that one of the two scripts was written by Rich Wilkes and the other was written by an unnamed writer, but Wilkes' script was the one he wanted as it excited him the most. However, Diesel ultimately opted out from making a second xXx film, which was titled xXx: State of the Union, due to disliking the script, feeling that it "didn't feel xXx" for him.

Although the character of Xander Cage was supposedly killed in the sequel to explain his absence, Vin Diesel announced in 2006 that he would be returning as Xander Cage in a sequel, entitled xXx: The Return of Xander Cage, with the character's death being retconned for the film. Initially, not only Diesel was set to return, but also Cohen. Diesel has said that the style and music will also be similar to that of the original film, more of what the fans want, with an emphasis on extreme stunts and with a heavy metal soundtrack. Joe Roth was in talks to produce. According to Cohen, he has also approached Sony, and "now we're writing a script with the guys who wrote Terminator 3 and Terminator Salvation. So we'll do another Xander Cage xXx. We'll bring it up to speed a bit and bring back the extreme sports guy who's drafted to be a spy." On June 10, 2009, Cohen dropped out of the production, instead moving to direct the action film Medieval. On August 26, 2009, SlashFilm announced that Ericson Core would be directing and production would start in early 2010.

In April 2010, it was revealed that the third film would be financed by Paramount Pictures instead of Sony and would also be shot in 3-D film. Meanwhile, Rob Cohen had returned as director. Vin Diesel will produce, among others, while Gloria S. Borders, Scott Hemming, Ric Kidney and Vince Totino will serve as executive producers.

=== Casting ===
In January 2014, Vin Diesel confirmed work on a sequel tentatively titled xXx: The Return of Xander Cage. On August 23, 2015, Vin Diesel announced on his Instagram page that "While I was filming xXx, guys on set called me Air Diesel... The time to return has come. Filming starts December in the Philippines. #ILiveForThisShit...". On October 10, 2015, it was reported that director D. J. Caruso would direct the film. Diesel announced that UFC fighter Conor McGregor was cast in a role and that Jackson will be reprising his role as Gibbons. However, in April 2016 it was announced McGregor had dropped out of his planned appearance to focus on training and the UFC; he was replaced by Michael Bisping. On January 1, 2016, Twitch Film reported that Tony Jaa, Jet Li and Deepika Padukone were cast in roles. The following week, Nina Dobrev and Ruby Rose were also cast. Dobrev would be playing a witty and sarcastic techie, while Padukone would play a huntress who happens to be Cage's former lover. Rose would play a sniper. Andrey Ivchenko was confirmed to be another villain in the film, given that earlier reports revealed Li to be playing an adversary as well.

It was rumored that Ice Cube, who played the protagonist Darius Stone in the second film in 2005, would reprise his role, which was confirmed in January 2017. On February 6, 2016, Caruso revealed on his Twitter account that Kris Wu had joined the cast, he also added that Wu would be playing a vital character. On February 12, 2016, reports brought in the news that Jet Li dropped out of the film and was replaced with Donnie Yen in the role of the main antagonist, Xiang. On June 3, 2016, it was revealed that Brazilian footballer Neymar joined the film's cast.

=== Filming ===
Principal photography began on February 2, 2016, primarily at Cinespace Film Studios' Kipling Avenue facility in Toronto, Ontario. It was also filmed on location in Hamilton, Ontario. Filming lasted until May 20, 2016, and also took place in Pinewood Indomina Studios, Dominican Republic and the Philippines.

== Music ==
Brian Tyler composed and wrote the film's original score alongside Robert Lydecker. The film's soundtrack contained songs and remixes of various artists, including songs by Kris Wu, Nicky Jam and Ice Cube who appear in the film.

xXx: Return of Xander Cage (Music from the Motion Picture)

Motion Picture Soundtrack
| No. | Title | Performer(s) | Length |
|---|---|---|---|
| 1. | "In My Foreign" | The Americanos featuring Ty Dolla Sign, Lil Yachty, Nicky Jam and French Montana | 3:38 |
| 2. | "All the Way Up (Remix)" | Fat Joe, Remy Ma and David Guetta | 3:31 |
| 3. | "Divebomb" | Madsonik and KILL THE NOISE featuring Tom Morello | 3:33 |
| 4. | "Anthem" | Alesso | 5:17 |
| 5. | "Gunshy" | ImanoS featuring Pusha T and Karen Harding | 3:54 |
| 6. | "Mercy" | Bishop Briggs | 2:48 |
| 7. | "Burning Man" | watt featuring Post Malone | 3:17 |
| 8. | "Blood in the Cut" | K. Flay | 3:08 |
| 9. | "Juice" | Kris Wu | 3:10 |
| 10. | "Take It to the Top" | Madsonik | 3:53 |
| 11. | "Thank God" | Ice Cube | 5:16 |

== Novelization ==
Tim Waggoner wrote the official movie novelization for the film.

== Release ==
=== Theatrical ===
The film premiered in Mexico City on January 5, 2017, and Paramount Pictures released the film on January 20, 2017, in the United States. The film was released on January 14, 2017, in India.

=== Home media ===
xXx: Return of Xander Cage was released on Digital HD May 2, 2017, Blu-ray and DVD on May 16, 2017.

== Reception ==
=== Box office ===
xXx: Return of Xander Cage grossed $44.9 million in the United States and Canada and $301.4 million in other territories for a worldwide total of $346.3 million, against a production budget of $85 million.

In North America, the film was released alongside Split, The Founder (film), The Resurrection of Gavin Stone and the wide expansion of 20th Century Women, and was expected to gross $16–20 million from about 3,651 theaters in its opening weekend. The film made $1.2 million from its Thursday night previews at 2,536 theaters. It ended up grossing $20 million, finishing second at the box office behind Split ($40.2 million) and ranking as the second-highest debut of the xXx franchise. Worldwide, the film had an opening weekend of $70.5 million, nearly totaling the amount its predecessor made during its entire theatrical run ($71.1 million).

In China, Paramount focused marketing efforts on Donnie Yen, placing him at the front of some film posters ahead of Vin Diesel, and sharing clips of Yen's performance in the film on popular Chinese social media site Weibo (company). These efforts proved successful as the film was number one in China in its opening weekend, earning $61.9 million. The film crossed the $100 million mark in just six days, with $22.2 million coming from Valentine's Day alone after reviews praising Donnie Yen's performance swept through Chinese social media. Aside from Donnie Yen, the digital focused marketing was also credited for the film's success. Kris Wu's popularity was also a key factor and his music video for his song in the xXx soundtrack garnered 40 million views ahead of the film's release in China. The film joined Terminator Genisys and Warcraft as the only Hollywood releases to earn $100 million in China without making $100 million in the United States. The largest territory for the film is China, with US$164 million.

=== Critical response ===
On Rotten Tomatoes, the film has an approval rating of 46% based on 147 reviews, and an average rating of 4.9/10. The site's critical consensus reads, "xXx: Return of Xander Cage should satisfy fans of the first two installments, but its preponderance of set pieces can't quite make up for a tired storyline that fails to take the franchise – or action fans – anywhere new." On Metacritic, the film has a weighted average score 42 out of 100, based on 25 critics, indicating "mixed or average reviews". On CinemaScore, audiences gave the film an average grade of "A−" on an A+ to F scale.

Andrew Lapin of Uproxx gave the film a negative review, saying: "There is an intellectual argument to be made in favor of the Fast & Furious franchise, which features diverse casts, operatic plotlines, and cartoon setpieces that often look like a child assembled them out of Hot Wheels sets. xXx is aiming for a much lower bar, striving only to be marketable, not inventive. The series is no longer interested in aping James Bond, lacking as it does a decent gadget or supervillain and often highlighting the sidekicks at the expense of Xander himself." Mick LaSalle of the San Francisco Chronicle praises Vin Diesel as an action hero and also praises Collette for her performance but says "the action becomes repetitive and tiresome". Leah Pickett of the Chicago Reader calls the film "only slightly less dumb and nonsensical than the previous films" and praises the action and stunt work from Diesel and Donnie Yen.

=== Accolades ===
| Award | Date of Ceremony | Category | Recipient(s) | Result | Ref. |
|---|---|---|---|---|---|
| Teen Choice Awards | August 13, 2017 | Choice Action Movie | DJ Caruso, Joe Roth, Vin Diesel | Nominated | |
| Teen Choice Awards | August 13, 2017 | Choice Action Movie Actor | Vin Diesel (also for The Fate of the Furious) | Nominated | |
| Teen Choice Awards | August 13, 2017 | Choice Action Movie Actress | Ruby Rose | Nominated | |
| Teen Choice Awards | August 13, 2017 | Choice Action Movie Actress | Nina Dobrev | Nominated | |
| Teen Choice Awards | August 13, 2017 | Choice Action Movie Actress | Deepika Padukone | Nominated | |
| Teen Choice Awards | August 13, 2017 | Choice Breakout Movie Star | Deepika Padukone | Nominated | |
| Teen Choice Awards | August 13, 2017 | Choice Movie Ship | Deepika Padukone and Ruby Rose | Nominated | |

== Sequel ==
In January 2017, in an interview with Variety, Diesel revealed that Paramount has already contacted him about returning for a fourth film. Director D. J. Caruso has confirmed the news on Twitter that all of the major cast would be back for the fourth installment of the franchise. Film producer Joe Roth told Variety, "In today's Hollywood, it requires strong partners to produce and finance such big-budget movies as the xXx series, and The H Collective is a welcome and exciting new company that we look forward to working with." On November 20, 2018, Deadline reported that both Jay Chou and Zoe Zhang were cast. In September 2023, it was reiterated that a fourth film was still in development, though production would not be able to start until Diesel completed his work on the upcoming eleventh Fast & Furious film. In 2024, an article by Deadline stated that the film has been stalled due to The H Collective's financial problems and litigation with the xXx franchise film rights.
