= Chris Lebenzon =

American film editor

- Born: Christopher John Lebenzon; October 29; Redwood City, California, USA
- Occupation: Film editor
- Years active: 1981–present

Christopher John Lebenzon is an American film editor with more than 50 film credits dating from 1981. The films he has edited have grossed over $10 billion worldwide.

== Career ==
He has been nominated for the Academy Award for Best Film Editing for the films Top Gun (1986) and Crimson Tide (1995). He is a member of the American Cinema Editors (A.C.E) and has been nominated six times having won The Eddie Award for his work on Sweeney Todd: The Demon Barber of Fleet Street (2007) and Alice in Wonderland (2010). He is noted particularly for working with directors Michael Bay, Tony Scott and has worked with Tim Burton for over 25 years.

In addition to editing, he has also served as an executive producer on Alice in Wonderland (2010) and Dark Shadows (2012).

== Filmography (as editor) ==
| Year | Film | Director | Notes |
|---|---|---|---|
| 1981 | Wolfen | Michael Wadleigh | |
| 1981 | One from the Heart | Francis Ford Coppola | Assistant editor |
| 1983 | The Outsiders | Francis Ford Coppola | First assistant editor |
| 1984 | A Breed Apart | Philippe Mora | |
| 1985 | Weird Science | John Hughes | |
| 1986 | Top Gun | Tony Scott | Nominated—Academy Award for Best Film Editing |
| 1987 | Beverly Hills Cop II | Tony Scott | |
| 1987 | Weeds | John D. Hancock | |
| 1988 | Midnight Run | Martin Brest | |
| 1990 | Revenge | Tony Scott | |
| 1990 | Days of Thunder | Tony Scott | |
| 1991 | Hudson Hawk | Michael Lehmann | |
| 1991 | The Last Boy Scout | Tony Scott | Additional editor |
| 1992 | Batman Returns | Tim Burton | |
| 1993 | The Nightmare Before Christmas | Henry Selick | Consulting editor |
| 1993 | Josh and S.A.M. | Billy Weber | |
| 1994 | Ed Wood | Tim Burton | |
| 1995 | Crimson Tide | Tony Scott | Nominated—Academy Award for Best Film Editing |
| 1996 | Mars Attacks! | Tim Burton | |
| 1997 | Con Air | Simon West | |
| 1998 | Armageddon | Michael Bay | |
| 1998 | Enemy of the State | Tony Scott | |
| 1999 | Sleepy Hollow | Tim Burton | Nominated—Satellite Award for Best Editing |
| 2000 | Gone in 60 Seconds | Dominic Sena | |
| 2001 | Pearl Harbor | Michael Bay | |
| 2001 | Planet of the Apes | Tim Burton | |
| 2002 | XXX | Rob Cohen | |
| 2003 | Radio | Michael Tollin | |
| 2003 | Big Fish | Tim Burton | |
| 2005 | Man of the House | Stephen Herek | |
| 2005 | Charlie and the Chocolate Factory | Tim Burton | Nominated—ACE Award for Best Edited Feature Film – Comedy or Musical |
| 2005 | Corpse Bride | Tim Burton | with Jonathan Lucas |
| 2006 | Déjà Vu | Tony Scott | |
| 2006 | Eragon | Stefen Fangmeier | Also additional editor |
| 2007 | Sweeney Todd: The Demon Barber of Fleet Street | Tim Burton | ACE Award for Best Edited Feature Film – Comedy or Musical; Awards Circuit Community Awards for Best Film Editing; Nominated - Gold Derby Awards for Best Film Editing |
| 2009 | The Taking of Pelham 123 | Tony Scott | |
| 2010 | Unstoppable | Tony Scott | Nominated—Satellite Award for Best Editing |
| 2010 | Alice in Wonderland | Tim Burton | Also executive producer ACE Editors Award for Best Edited Feature Film – Comedy or Musical |
| 2012 | Dark Shadows | Tim Burton | Also executive producer |
| 2012 | Frankenweenie | Tim Burton | Nominated—ACE Award for Best Edited Animated Feature Film |
| 2012 | Here with Me | Tim Burton | Music video |
| 2014 | Maleficent | Robert Stromberg | |
| 2015 | The Last Witch Hunter | Breck Eisner | |
| 2016 | Miss Peregrine's Home for Peculiar Children | Tim Burton | |
| 2017 | Geostorm | Dean Devlin | |
| 2019 | Dumbo | Tim Burton | |
| 2020 | Dolittle | Stephen Gaghan | with Craig Alpert |
| 2022 | Uncharted | Ruben Fleischer | with Richard Pearson |
| 2022 | Disenchanted | Adam Shankman | with Emma E. Hickox |
| 2022 | Top Gun: Maverick | Joseph Kosinski | Additional Editor |
| 2023 | Ghosted | Dexter Fletcher | with Jim May and Josh Schaeffer |
| 2024 | Kraven the Hunter | J. C. Chandor | Additional Editor |
| 2025 | Play Dirty | Shane Black | |
