= Jan Pavel Filipensky =

Czech actor

Jan Pavel Filipenský
- Born: 8 October 1973 (age 52); Prague, Czech Republic
- Years active: 2000–present

Jan Pavel Filipenský (born 8 October 1973) is a Czech actor. He is best known for his performances in XXX as Viktor and Alien vs. Predator as Boris.

== Filmography ==
Year	Title	Role	Notes
2000	Pramen života		
2000	Fatal Conflict	Mine Reception Guard	
2000	Rage of the Innocents	Smea	
2002	XXX	Viktor	
2002	Ariana's Quest	Turgo	TV movie
2003	Children of Dune	Sardaukar Tiger Trainer	
2004	Chasing Liberty	Farmer's Son 2	
2004	Alien vs. Predator	Boris	
2005	Everything Is Illuminated	Well Digger	
2007	La Vie en rose	Fire Eater	
2007	Joséphine, ange gardien	Guard	Episode: "Le secret des Templiers"
2008	The Chronicles of Narnia: Prince Caspian	Wimbleweather	
2009	The Pagan Queen	Blacksmith	
2011	Mission: Impossible – Ghost Protocol	Control Room Guard #1	
2012	Líbáš jako ďábel		
2012	The Man Who Laughs	Artiste champ de foire	
2016	Dvojníci	Bohous	
