= List of people with surname MacNamara =

MacNamara is a surname.

== People with the surname MacNamara ==
- Arthur Macnamara (1831–1906), British squire and magistrate
- Brinsley MacNamara (1890–1963), Irish writer
- Caitlin Macnamara (1913–1994), British writer
- Ian McNamara (contemporary), Australian radio announcer
- James Macnamara (1768–1826), British naval officer
- Jean Macnamara (1899–1968), Australian medical scientist
- John Macnamara (1905–1944), British MP and army officer
- Patrick Macnamara (1886–1957), British admiral
- Stephen MacNamara (contemporary), American professor

== People with the surname McNamara ==
- A. J. McNamara (1936–2014), judge of the U.S. District Court for the Eastern District of Louisiana
- Andrew McNamara (politician) (born 1959), Australian politician from Queensland
- Andy McNamara (born 1969), American radio sports announcer
- Barbara McNamara (1942–2026), American linguist, former deputy director of the National Security Agency
- Bob McNamara (disambiguation)
- Brad McNamara (born 1965), Australian professional cricketer
- Brian McNamara (born 1960), American actor
- Conor McNamara (contemporary), Irish football commentator
- Dan McNamara (born 1984), American comedian and special effects artist
- Danny McNamara (disambiguation)
- Dave McNamara (1887–1967), Australian Rules footballer
- D. Harold McNamara (1923-2014), American astronomer
- Dinny McNamara (1905–1936), American professional baseball player and coach
- Edward H. McNamara (1926–2006), American politician from Wayne County, Michigan; mayor of Livonia 1970–1986
- Edward James McNamara (1884–1944), American actor
- Eileen McNamara (born 1952), American journalist, professor, and author
- Emmet McNamara (born 1990), Irish jockey
- Eugene McNamara (1930-2016), Canadian poet, author and professor
- Frank McNamara (contemporary), Irish musician
- Frank Hubert McNamara (1894–1961), Australian recipient of the Victoria Cross
- Garrett McNamara (born 1967), American surfer
- George McNamara (1886–1952), Canadian professional ice hockey player; brother of Harold and Howard McNamara
- Gerry McNamara (1934–2025), Canadian ice hockey player and general manager
- Gerry McNamara (born 1983), American professional basketball player
- Greg McNamara (1950–1997), Australian professional boxer
- Harold McNamara (1889–1937), Canadian professional ice hockey player; brother of George and Howard McNamara
- Henry McNamara (1934-2018), American politician from New Jersey
- Holly McNamara (born 2003), Australian footballer
- Matilda McNamara (born 1998), Australian footballer
- Howard McNamara (1890–1940), Canadian professional ice hockey player; brother of George and Harold McNamara
- Ian McNamara, Australian radio personality
- Jackie McNamara, Sr. (born 1952), Scottish professional footballer
- Jackie McNamara (born 1973), Scottish professional footballer and manager
- James A. McNamara, distinguished professor of orthodontics at University of Michigan Dental School
- The McNamara brothers (James and John) (fl. 1905–1941), American trade unionists, bombed the office of the Los Angeles Times 1910
- Jim McNamara (born 1965), American professional baseball player
- John McNamara (born 1950), an American artist
- John McNamara (1936-2020), a baseball manager
- John McNamara, a recipient of the Victoria Cross
- John McNamara, co-creator of Profit (TV series)
- John McNamara, one of the McNamara brothers who bombed the office of the Los Angeles Times in 1910
- John J. McNamara, banker, author, Olympic medal winner
- Joseph McNamara (disambiguation)
- Julianne McNamara (born 1965), American artistic gymnast; 1980 and 1984 Olympic contestant
- Katherine McNamara (born 1995), American actress, singer-songwriter, and dancer
- Kevin McNamara (1926–1987), Irish Roman Catholic bishop and academic; Archbishop of Dublin 1984–87
- Kevin McNamara (1934–2017), British politician and MP
- Leah McNamara, Irish actress
- Maggie McNamara (1928–1978), American actress
- Margaret McNamara (1915–1981), American teacher; founder of Reading is Fundamental; wife of Robert S. McNamara
- Mark McNamara (born 1959), American professional basketball player
- Michael McNamara (born 1974), Irish politician; Dáil Deputy, 2011-
- Michelle McNamara (1970-2016), True crime author; wife of comedian Patton Oswalt
- Mike McNamara (born 1949), Irish hurling manager
- Neville McNamara (1923–2014), Australian Air Force commander
- Pat McNamara (actor) (1933–2024), American actor
- Pat McNamara (Australian politician) (born 1949), Australian politician from Victoria
- Pat McNamara (Irish politician) (1938–2016), mayor of Galway
- Pat McNamara (footballer) (1912–1983), Australian rules footballer
- Pat McNamara (speed skater) (1925–2011), American speed skater
- Patrick McNamara (neuroscientist) (born 1956), American neuroscientist
- Patrick V. McNamara (1894–1966), American politician from Michigan; U.S. Senator 1954–66
- Percy McNamara (fl. 1908–1909), Australian rugby league player
- Peter McNamara (1955–2019), Australian professional tennis player
- Richard McNamara (born 1972), English rock guitarist and drummer; brother of Danny McNamara
- Robert McNamara (1916–2009), American businessman, U.S. Secretary of Defense under John F. Kennedy and Lyndon B. Johnson; president of the World Bank
- Robert McNamara (born 1987), Australian figure skater
- Robert Craig McNamara, biologist, pedologist, businessman and farmer practicing sustainable agriculture; son of the U.S. Secretary of Defense
- Robin McNamara (1947–2021), American singer, songwriter, and musician
- Sean McNamara (born 1962), American film writer, director, and producer
- Shane McNamara (contemporary), Australian television and film actor
- Shelley McNamara, Irish architect and academic founded Grafton Architects with Yvonne Farrell
- Steve McNamara (born 1971), English rugby league coach
- Tom McNamara (disambiguation)
- Ted McNamara (1824––1928), Australian actor
- William McNamara (1879–1947), Canadian politician from Alberta; expelled from mayorship 1914
- William McNamara (born 1965), American actor

== Fictional characters ==
- Sean McNamara, character in Nip/Tuck
- Tank McNamara, titular character of the syndicated comic strip
- William McNamara, character in Hart's War
- Heather McNamara, a character in the 1988 film Heathers, and its musical and TV adaptations
