= Pat McNamara =

Pat or Patrick McNamara may refer to:

- Pat McNamara (actor) (1933–2024), American actor
- Pat McNamara (Australian politician) (born 1949), Australian politician
- Pat McNamara (Irish politician) (1938–2016), mayor of Galway
- Pat McNamara (footballer) (1912–1983), Australian rules footballer
- Pat McNamara (speed skater) (1925–2011), American speed skater
- Patrick V. McNamara (1894–1966), American politician
- Patrick McNamara (neuroscientist) (born 1956), American neuroscientist
- Patrick Macnamara (1886–1957), British admiral

== See also ==
- List of people with surname MacNamara
