= Blue Thunder =

1983 film by John Badham

- Theatrical release poster
- Directed by: John Badham
- Written by: Dan O'Bannon; Don Jakoby
- Produced by: Gordon Carroll; Phil Feldman; Andrew Fogelson
- Starring: Roy Scheider; Warren Oates; Candy Clark; Daniel Stern; Malcolm McDowell
- Cinematography: John A. Alonzo
- Edited by: Edward M. Abroms; Frank Morriss
- Music by: Arthur B. Rubinstein
- Production company: Rastar
- Distributed by: Columbia Pictures
- Release dates: February 5, 1983 (West Germany); May 13, 1983 (United States)
- Running time: 109 minutes
- Country: United States
- Budget: $22 million
- Box office: approx. $42.3 million

Blue Thunder is a 1983 American neo noir action thriller film directed by John Badham and starring Roy Scheider, Malcolm McDowell, Daniel Stern, Candy Clark and Warren Oates. It depicts a Los Angeles police officer (Scheider) who discovers a conspiracy to dominate the city with an advanced military helicopter.

A spin-off television series, also called Blue Thunder, ran for 11 episodes in 1984.

== Plot ==
Frank Murphy is a Los Angeles Police Department (LAPD) air support division pilot and troubled Vietnam War Veteran with post-traumatic stress disorder. He patrols the city by helicopter with a newly assigned observer, rookie officer Richard Lymangood, and assist police forces on the ground when needed. The pair are placed under a two-week suspension for allegations of voyeurism during a mugging that resulted in the death of city councilwoman Diana McNeely. Murphy is provisionally reinstated by Captain Jack Braddock and instructed to attend a private sunrise demonstration in the Mojave Desert at "Pinkville", a US Government weapons testing facility. Murphy is selected to pilot an advanced helicopter nicknamed "Blue Thunder" for an evaluation exercise. It is a military-style combat aircraft equipped with bulletproof armor, state of the art surveillance, recording and communications equipment, a six-barreled 20 millimeter electric cannon, and a silent flight mode, it is intended for law enforcement operations against possible large-scale civic disobedience or terrorism during the upcoming 1984 Summer Olympics in Los Angeles.

Probing McNeely's death to be more than just a random murder, Murphy begins his own covert investigation and finds a subversive action group intends to use Blue Thunder in a military role to quell urban disorder under the project codename T.H.O.R. ("Tactical Helicopter Offensive Response"). They are secretly eliminating political opponents to advance their agenda which McNelly was assuming at the time. Murphy suspects the involvement of his old Vietnam nemesis, former United States Army Colonel F.E. Cochrane, the primary test pilot for Blue Thunder and someone who felt Murphy was "unsuitable" for the program. During a test flight operation over the city, Murphy and Lymangood use Blue Thunder to record a meeting that implicates Cochrane and other government officials in the conspiracy. Cochrane spots Blue Thunder and realizes what has happened.

Lymangood conceals the videotape after landing, but is ambushed upon returning to his home, interrogated, and killed while trying to escape. Murphy hijacks Blue Thunder and arranges for his girlfriend Kate to retrieve the tape and deliver it to a local TV station. Kate is pursued through the city and intercepted by one of the conspirators, Fletcher, claiming to be a news producer. Fletcher is unable to prevent Kate's actual news contact from retrieving the tape, and is subdued by a security guard.

Cochrane and the other conspirators employ every asset they can manage to bring Blue Thunder down before Murphy can expose them. The municipal government launches two LAPD Bell 206s to assist the conspirators. Murphy forces the first to land via autorotation, then leads the other, slaloming down the Los Angeles River viaduct until his pursuer crashes. Two Air National Guard F-16 fighters are deployed to shoot Murphy down, but he manages to shoot one of them down and evade the other. The use of heat-seeking missiles causes collateral damage to a barbecue stand in Little Tokyo and the sun-heated windows of an ARCO Plaza high-rise building and the halts the hunt-and-destroy operation.

Cochrane, obsessed with putting down his former subordinate, neglects orders to resign and ambushes Blue Thunder in a heavily armed Hughes 500 helicopter. After a tense battle, Murphy shoots Cochrane down, executing a 360° loop through use of Blue Thunder's turbine boost function. With the aircraft having sustained heavy damage and running low on fuel, Murphy destroys Blue Thunder by landing it in front of an approaching freight train. In the meantime, the tape recording is made public, and the conspirators are exposed and arrested.

== Cast ==
- Roy Scheider as LAPD Officer Frank Murphy
- Warren Oates as LAPD Capt. Jack Braddock
- Candy Clark as Kate
- Daniel Stern as LAPD Officer Richard Lymangood
- Malcolm McDowell as United States Army Colonel F.E. Cochrane
- Paul Roebling as Icelan
- David Sheiner as Fletcher
- Joe Santos as Montoya
- Jason Bernard as The Mayor
- Robin Braxton as Councilwoman Diane McNeely
- Ed Bernard as Sgt. Short
- James Murtaugh as Alf Hewitt
- Pat McNamara as Matusek
- Jack Murdock as Kress
- Anthony James as Grundelius
- Jerry Ziesmer as Pilot
- Mario Machado as himself

== Production ==
Co-writers Dan O'Bannon and Don Jakoby began developing the plot while living together in a Hollywood apartment in the late 1970s, where low-flying police helicopters woke them on a regular basis. Their original script (originally labeled Blue Thor) was a more political one, attacking the concept of a police state controlling the population through high-tech surveillance and heavy armament. They sought and received extensive script help from Captain Bob Woods, then-chief of the LAPD's Air Support Division. The first draft of the screenplay for Blue Thunder was written in 1979 and featured Frank Murphy as more of a crazy main character with deeper psychological issues, who went on a rampage and destroyed much of Los Angeles before finally falling to F-16s.

The script was rewritten by American screenwriter Dean Riesner with directions on the style of dialogue from director John Badham (reportedly, the character of Lymangood was not in the original script), although he was not given credit.

Filmed on location in Los Angeles took place from October 1981 to January 1982. Blue Thunder was one of Warren Oates' last films before his death on April 3, 1982, which occurred during post-production, and the film is dedicated to him. He made one movie and one TV episode before and after filming during 1981–1982 that were released after Blue Thunder.

Although the film was shot in Los Angeles and real-life neighborhoods are mentioned, the LAPD did not allow any references to be made to them. Hence, the police force is known as the more-generic "Metropolitan Police" and Frank Murphy is part of the fictional "ASTRO Division", rather than the real-life "Air Support Division". However, Air Support assignments are often known as ASTRO, or "Air Support to Regular Operations".

The LAPD Hooper Heliport, which was still under construction at the time, filled in as the home base for the fictional version of the police air unit. The drive-in theater scene where Frank's girlfriend Kate recovers the tape was filmed at the Pickwick Theatre in Burbank, California; the theater has since then been demolished and replaced by a Pavilions supermarket.

Malcolm McDowell, who portrayed antagonist F. E. Cochrane, ironically has an intense fear of flying in real life and not even his then-wife Mary Steenburgen could persuade him to overcome his phobia. In an interview for Starlog in 1983, Badham recalled: "He was terrified. He used to get out and throw up after a flight." McDowell's grimaces and discomfort can be seen during the climactic battle between Murphy and Cochrane in the film. Steenburgen commented to filmmakers afterward, "I don't know how you got him up there, I can't even get him in a 747!"

Roy Scheider was at that point mainly known for having played Chief Martin Brody in the first two Jaws movies. At the time, a third movie was in production, and he had no desire to do it, saying, "Mephistopheles ... couldn't talk me into doing [it]. ... They knew better than to even ask", so he agreed to participate in the filming of Blue Thunder, to ensure his unavailability for Jaws III.

== Blue Thunder helicopter ==
Blue Thunder Fictional aircraft
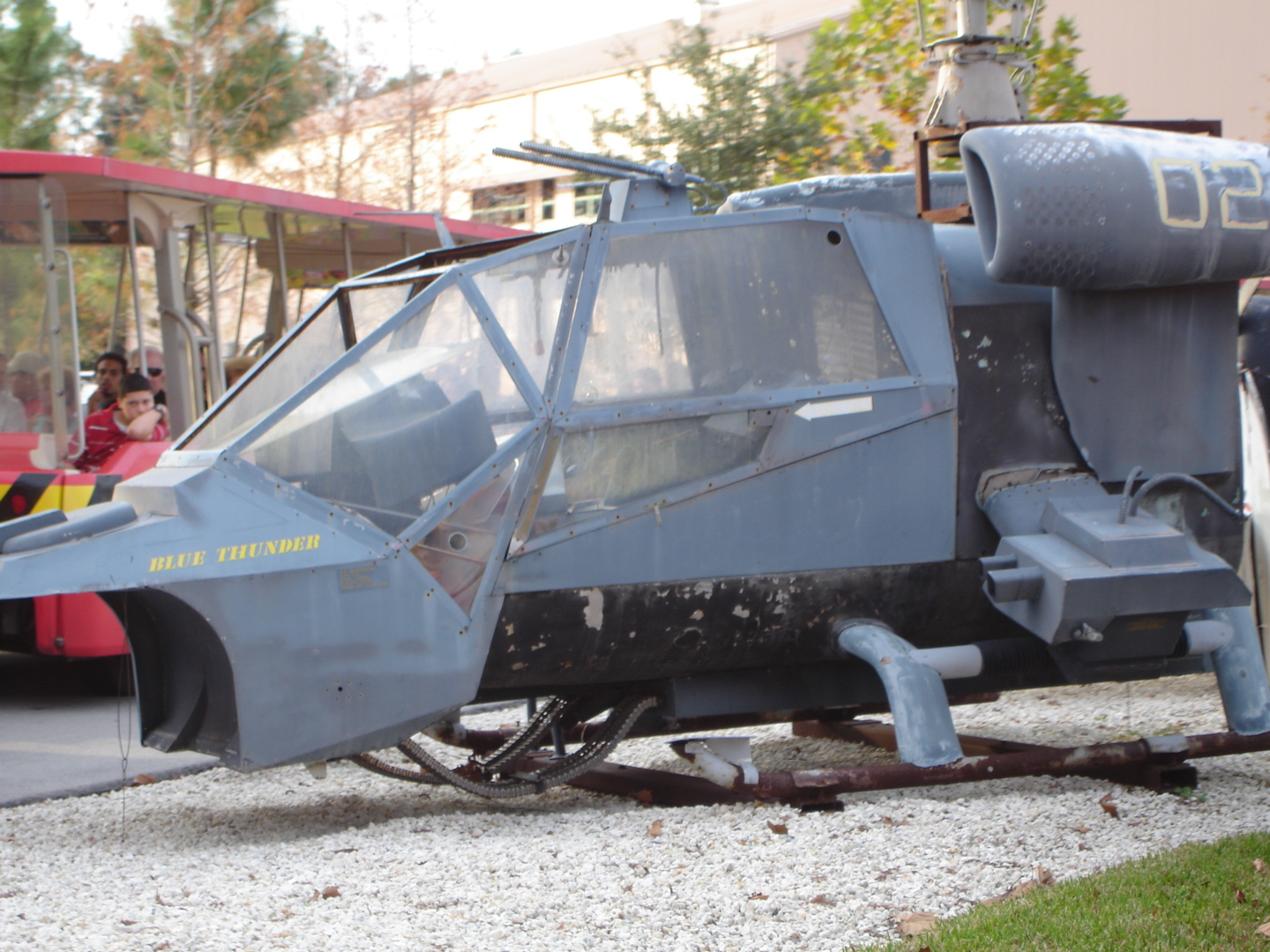
- A mock-up of Blue Thunder, as part of the Studio Backlot Tour of Disney's Hollywood Studios, Florida

General information
- Type: Armed police helicopter
- Manufacturer: Aerospatiale Gazelle Helicopter SA342
- Primary user: LAPD
- Number built: 1

History
- First flight: 1983
- Developed from: Aérospatiale Gazelle
- Variant: Gazelle

Blue Thunder is the helicopter in the film and television series. The fictional aircraft itself was a modified Aérospatiale Gazelle helicopter.

To film Blue Thunder, the producers employed two examples of the French-made Aérospatiale SA-341G Gazelle light utility helicopter, serial numbers 1066 and 1075, both built in 1973. After the film and TV series was made, both helicopters were sold to Michael E. Grube, an aviation salvage collector in Clovis, New Mexico. Sometime after, around 1985, one of the helicopters had a small role in the pilot episode of MacGyver, which featured the helicopter in a different paint job, the microphones were removed, the video surveillance package removed leaving empty mounting pylons in place, and the number on the side being changed from "02" to "51".

Grube then leased s/n 1066 (ex-N51BT) to a film company that was shooting Amerika, an ABC television mini-series about Soviet occupation of the United States; the helicopters were painted black with red tail stripe and numbering, missile launchers were installed on the pylons, and the surveillance microphones were removed on both. After Grube got 1066 back, it was dismantled and sold for parts.

The second, s/n 1075 (ex-N52BT), was scrapped during 1988. There was a third static display model built for close-up shots with the actors; it was stored outside and after deterioration was scrapped by 2009. The bolt-on cockpit of the original helicopter used to be visible on the backlot tour of the Disney-MGM Studios theme park in Florida. It has not been present in the 'bone yard' since at least 2005.

=== Design ===
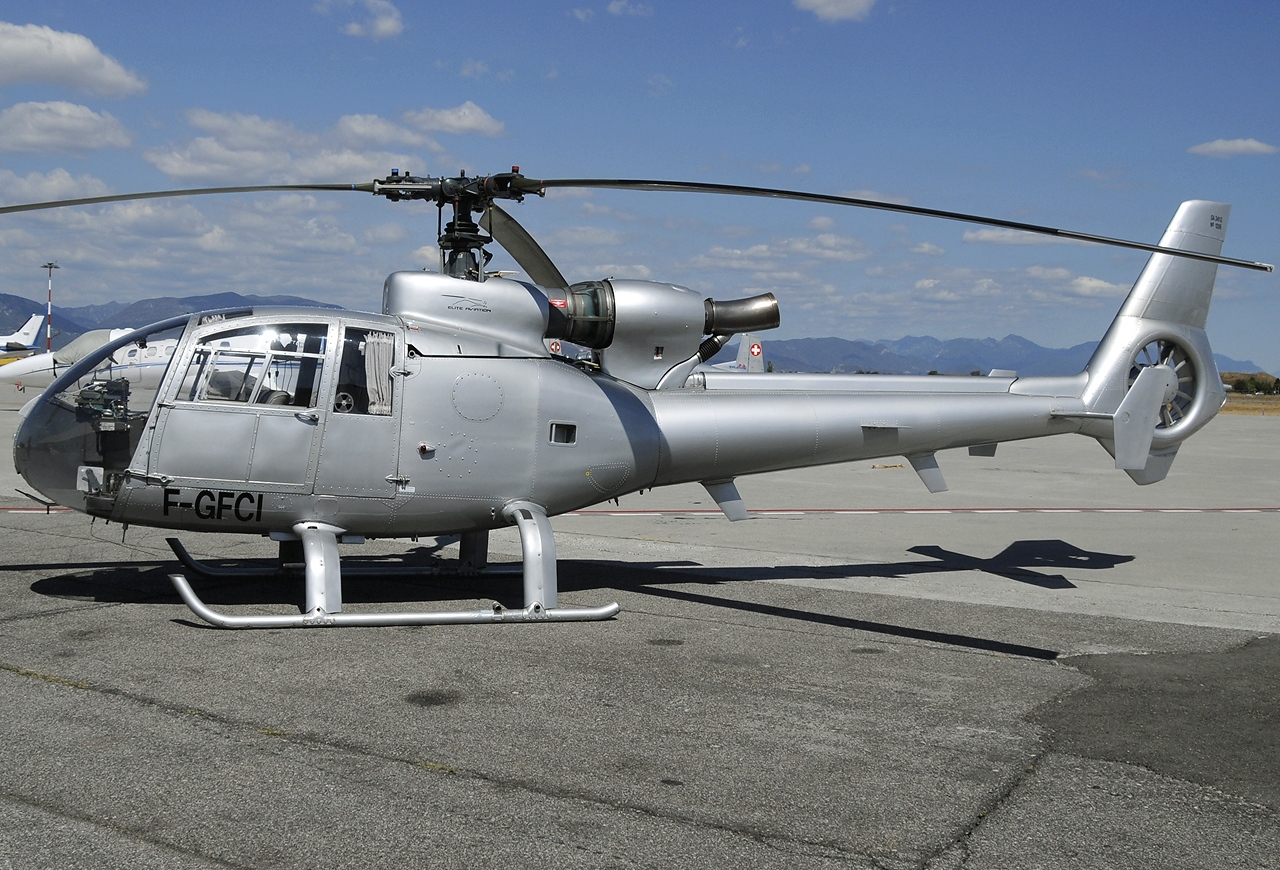
An Aerospatiale SA341G, the type converted to Blue Thunder for the film

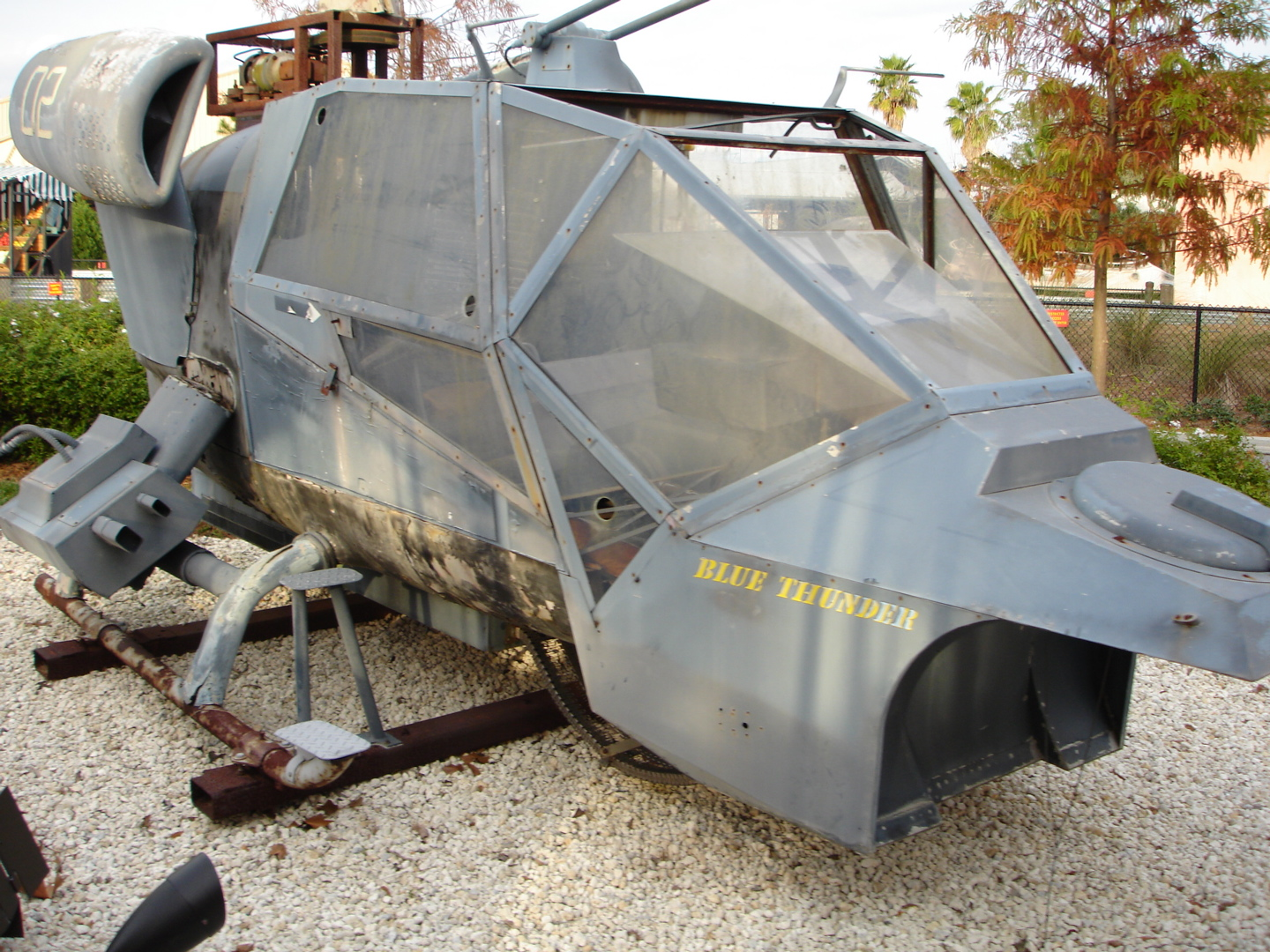
Right close-up

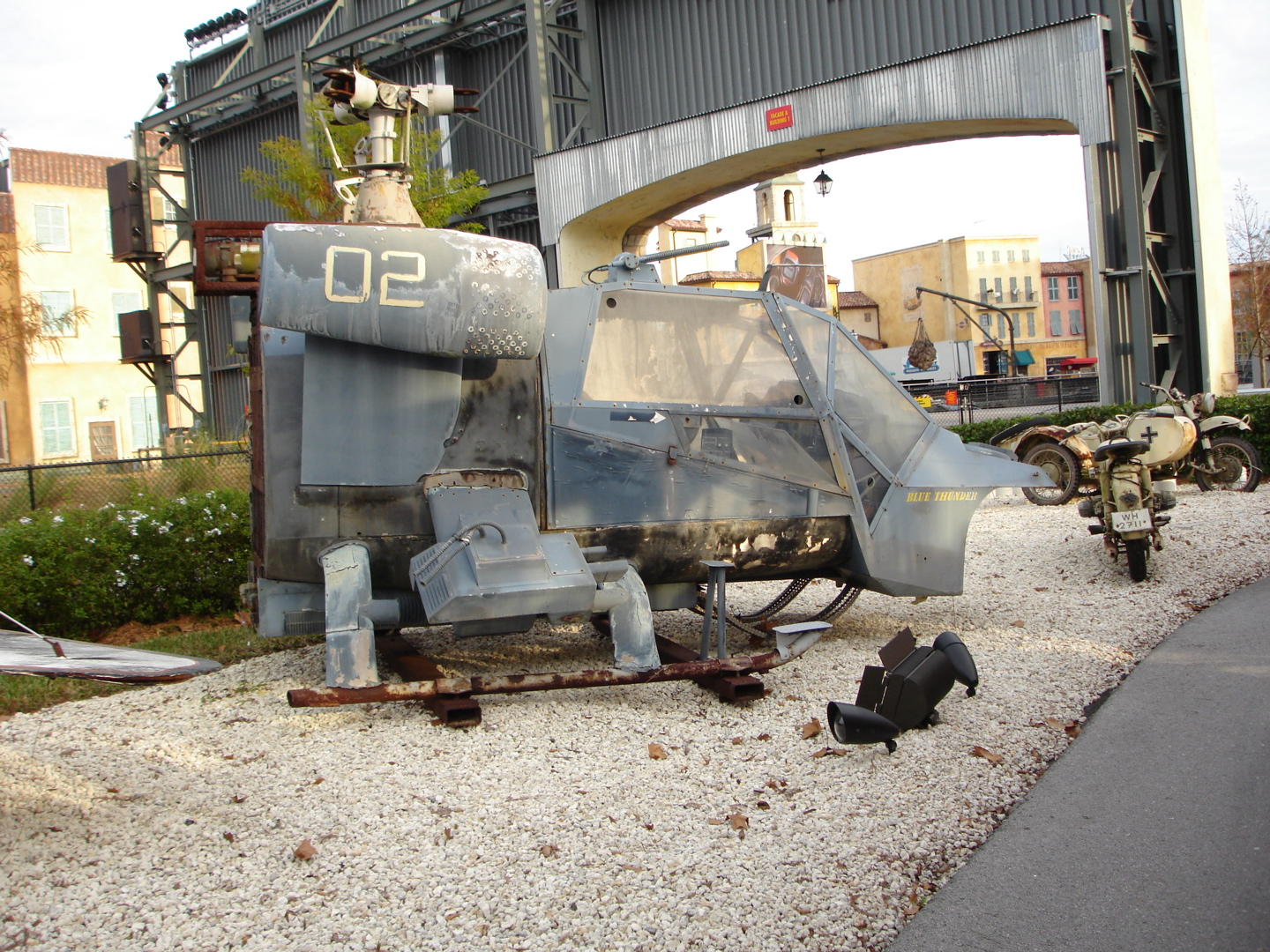
Right side

Designer Mickey Michaels created the helicopters used in the film after reviewing and rejecting various existing designs. The helicopters used for Blue Thunder were French built Aérospatiale SA-341G Gazelles modified with bolt-on parts and Apache-style canopies. Two modified Gazelle helicopters were used: one for the actual stunts (a "stunt mule"), and one as a backup in case the other was grounded for maintenance. Stunts were flown by Jim Gavin.

Also used in filming were a Hughes 500 helicopter, and two radio-controlled F-16 fighter models.

The Gazelle helicopters were purchased from Aérospatiale by Columbia Pictures for $190,000 each and flown to Cinema Air in Carlsbad, California where they were heavily modified for the film. These alterations made the helicopters so heavy that various tricks had to be employed to make it look fast and agile in the film. For instance, the 360° loop maneuver Murphy performs at the end of the film, which catches Cochrane so completely by surprise that he is easily shot down by Murphy's gunfire and killed, was carried out by a radio controlled model. (This aircraft was built and flown by modeller and RC helicopter manufacturer John Simone Jr.)

=== Fictional characteristics ===
Described in the film as having 1 in (25 mm) "NORDOC-NATO armor", Blue Thunder had a chin turret with an electric 20 mm (0.79 in) six-barrel rotary cannon capable of a rate of fire of 4,000 rounds per minute. Surveillance used twin cheek-mounted Nitesun spotlights, infrared thermograph, and airborne TV camera with 100:1 zoom and night-vision capability. The cameras fed 3/4 in (19 mm) videotape, with a locker in the belly of the aircraft. External audio pickups were capable of hearing "a mouse fart at two thousand feet". A "whisper mode" granted it the ability to operate in silence. It also has a "Turbine boost", a turbo boost function giving Blue Thunder increased speed; in the film it was used to help perform a 360° loop.

Blue Thunder's cannon was controlled by a Harrison helmet in conjunction with a "Harrison Fire Control System", named after one of the special effects prop designers. The project cost was described as US$5 million.

The helmet-controlled gun turret and Target Acquisition and Designation Sights, Pilot Night Vision System (TADS/PNVS) is similar to that of the AH-64 Apache, which uses an "Integrated Helmet And Display Sight System" (IHADSS), wherein the nose-mounted sensors and the 30 mm chain gun are linked to the gunner's helmet.

== Reception ==
=== Box office ===
Blue Thunder was released on May 13, 1983. It was the number 1 ranked film in the United States on its opening weekend, taking in $8,258,149 at 1,539 theaters, overtaking the previous number 1 film Flashdance. The film was ranked No. 2 in its second and third weekends. Overall, in the US, it earned $42,313,354 over its 66 days of release. Blue Thunder was released in West Germany on February 5, 1983, before its US release, and it was released worldwide between June and September 1983. Its UK release was August 25, 1983. It was released in East Germany and South Korea in 1984. Its total international box office income is unreported. The film earned $21.9 million from video rentals in the US.

=== Critical response ===
On the review aggregator website Rotten Tomatoes, 79% of 28 critics' reviews are positive. On Metacritic, it has a score of 66% based on reviews from 11 critics, indicating "generally favorable" reviews.

Variety called it "a ripsnorting live-action cartoon, utterly implausible but no less enjoyable for that". Rita Kempley of The Washington Post wrote: "Blue Thunder hovers just this side of trash and the other side of credibility, but it propels a willing audience into adrenaline heaven." Vincent Canby of The New York Times wrote: "The action sequences are what the film is all about, and these are remarkably well done, including a climactic, largely bloodless shootout among helicopters and jet fighters over Los Angeles."

C. J. Henderson reviewed Blue Thunder in The Space Gamer No. 63. Henderson commented that "Blue Thunder is this year's must-see action film. See it."

Christopher John reviewed Blue Thunder in Ares Magazine #14 and commented that "For those who want a film that is both filled with action and thought provoking, Blue Thunder is a sure bet. Watch out, George, the Jedi have competition."

The film garnered an Oscar nomination for Best Film Editing for Frank Morriss and Edward Abroms, but lost out to The Right Stuff.

In 2025, The Hollywood Reporter listed Blue Thunder as having the best stunts of 1983.

== Cultural references ==
An acronym used in the film, "JAFO", meaning "Just Another Fucking Observer", is police community jargon and is mentioned repeatedly in the film in reference to any police helicopter's non-pilot second officer, in this case Daniel Stern's character of Richard Lymangood. In the related TV series, the reference is expurgated for prime-time television as "Just Another Frustrated Observer" for Clinton Wonderlove (Dana Carvey).

== Posterity ==
A screen still from Blue Thunder of the helicopter flying in front of the Los Angeles skyline is used as the background image of the title screen in the Sega 1987 video game Thunder Blade.

In the TaleSpin episode "Baloo Thunder", the episode title and certain plot elements are referenced and parodied from the film, when ace pilot Baloo helps out his inventor friend Buzz, who is being framed for stealing a "Top Secret Project" from his industrialist employer Shere Khan by an ambitious corporate spy within Khan Industries for a rival competitor, which in reality is the new invention for its time period: the helicopter.

In the 2002 video game Grand Theft Auto: Vice City, the player can infiltrate a military base and steal an attack helicopter to perform vigilante missions known as Brown Thunder, spoofing the film.

Blue Thunder has become the nickname of No. 658 Squadron of the Army Air Corps, a specialist counter-terrorism force providing aviation support to the British Army's Special Air Service.

== Video game ==
In 1987, Coca-Cola Telecommunications released a Blue Thunder video tape cartridge for Worlds of Wonder's short lived Action Max game system. Using footage from the film, the player plays the pilot of the Blue Thunder helicopter as he tries to prevent the World Peace Coalition from being attacked by a terrorist organization.

== Remake ==
In 2015, Sony proposed a remake of Blue Thunder focusing on drone technology, with Dana Brunetti and Michael De Luca as producers, and Craig Kyle as writer. In 2017, it was announced that Columbia Pictures would be overseeing the remake.

== See also ==
- List of films featuring surveillance
- List of American films of 1983
- Airwolf
- Thunder Blade

== Bibliography ==
- Farmer, James H. (1984). Broken Wings: Hollywood's Air Crashes. Missoula, Montana: Pictorial Histories Pub Co. ISBN 978-0-933126-46-6.
