= MacNamara (disambiguation) =

MacNamara is an Irish surname.

MacNamara or Macnamara can also refer to:

- MacNamara Glacier, glacier in Antarctica
- Division of MacNamara, electoral division in Greater Melbourne, Victoria, Australia
- Macnamara, Australian Capital Territory, Australia, suburb
- Macnamara Morgan, Irish playwright

See also:

- List of people with surname MacNamara
