= Blue Thunder (TV series) =

American action drama television series

- DVD cover
- Genre: Action
- Based on: Blue Thunder
- Directed by: Guy Magar
- Starring: James Farentino; Dana Carvey; Sandy McPeak; Dick Butkus; Bubba Smith
- Composer: Frank Denson
- Country of origin: United States
- Original language: English
- No. of seasons: 1
- No. of episodes: 11

Production
- Running time: 60 minutes
- Production companies: Rastar Productions; Public Arts; Columbia Pictures Television

Original release
- Network: ABC
- Release: January 6 – April 16, 1984

Blue Thunder is an American action drama television series based on the movie of the same title that aired on ABC from January 6 until April 16, 1984, featuring the Blue Thunder helicopter.

The series revolves around the tactical helicopter being operated by a four-person LAPD Air Support Division team, but partially controlled by APEX, a fictional federal government agency that oversees and monitors (also occasionally assigns missions) its operations and maintenance, which is on loan to the police force for usage against criminal elements and security threats.

Blue Thunder used the converted Aérospatiale Gazelle helicopter and large portions of stock footage from the 1983 film. A ground unit named "Rolling Thunder" backed up the helicopter in the television series. This was a large support van with a desert camouflage off-road vehicle stored inside.

The television series cast includes James Farentino, future Saturday Night Live regular Dana Carvey, and former professional American football players Bubba Smith and Dick Butkus.

The show was developed by executive producer Roy Huggins, with David Moessinger serving as co-executive producer. It aired as a mid-season replacement on Friday nights, where it competed against Airwolf on CBS, another helicopter-themed action series that proved more successful. After only 11 episodes were produced, Blue Thunder was canceled by ABC due to low ratings.

== Cast ==
- James Farentino as Frank Chaney, protagonist, policeman and pilot of Blue Thunder.
- Dana Carvey as Clinton Wonderlove, aka "JAFO", Chaney's flight engineer of Blue Thunder, as well as his sidekick. Wonderlove handles technical aspects of the helicopter.
- Sandy McPeak as Captain Ed Braddock, the Blue Thunder team's superior.
- Bubba Smith as Lyman "Bubba" Kelsey, a cop who is one of the two members of "Rolling Thunder" of the Blue Thunder ground crew.
- Dick Butkus as Richard "Ski" Butowski, another cop who is the other member of "Rolling Thunder".
- Ann Cooper as J.J. Douglas, radio operator who is Chaney's contact at headquarters.

== Episode list ==
| No. | Title | Directed by | Written by | Original release date |
|---|---|---|---|---|
| 1 | "Second Thunder" | Gilbert M. Shilton | David Moessinger, Jeri Taylor | January 6, 1984 |
The team is formed to stop a madman drug runner pilot who has been gunning down regular police helicopters and who has a personal grudge against Chaney. Guest Stars: Richard Lynch as PVC, and Troy Evans as Watch Commander.
| 2 | "A Clear and Present Danger" | Charles Picerni | S : James Patrick, Don Safran; T : Mike Robe | January 13, 1984 |
The team must stop a paramilitary operation "Posse Magistratus" that is trying to take over the country through political assassinations and bank robberies. Guest Stars Geoffrey Lewis as Sheriff Tenney, Gracie Harrison as Sarah O'Connell, Michael Alldredge as Hal Winters.
| 3 | "Arms Race" | Gilbert M. Shilton | S : Doreen Bergesen; T : Craig Buck; S/T : Dan O'Bannon, Don Jakoby | January 20, 1984 |
The team goes after an arms smuggling ring being run by an old friend of Chaney's that is selling weapons to an African tyrant. Guest Stars Ted Hamilton as Harold Longstreet, Darleen Carr as Aggie Mills, Ed Grover as Ken Rawls, Sam Anderson as Benjamin Kelty, M. C. Gainey as Saver, Arnold Turner as Sheriff, Tom Nibley as Bill Bollinger.
| 4 | "Revenge in the Sky" | Bernard McEveety | James Doherty | January 27, 1984 |
Chaney discovers that the FBI agent, who had asked the team to recover a stolen Korean War-era fighter plane, is a Soviet double agent. Guest Stars: David Spielberg as Bruce Walsh, Katherine Justice as Kate Cunningham, Kai Wulff as Allan Swenson, Robert Donner as Neil Gerrard, Matthew Faison as Ralph Gately, Kurtwood Smith as Bill Spradley.
| 5 | "Trojan Horse" | Guy Magar | Brian Alan Lane | February 3, 1984 |
Bubba and Ski go undercover in a prison, as inmate and guard, to prevent a convicted swindler from escaping. Guest stars include Elizabeth Hoffman, Dennis Holahan and Vince Howard.
| 6 | "Skydiver" | Guy Magar | Rick Kelbaugh | February 24, 1984 |
Chaney must decide whether to rescue the lovely president of a third world nation who is about to be assassinated or to rescue Bubba and Ski who are on a small plane which is about to crash. Guest stars include Tracy Scoggins, Luisa Leschin and Richard Yniguez.
| 7 | "Clipped Wings" | Bernard McEveety | Allison Hock | March 2, 1984 |
Chaney's archrival is given control of Blue Thunder after Chaney is reassigned for breaking off a drug stake out in order to pursue kidnappers. Guest stars include Terry McGovern, Scott Hylands and Raye Birk.
| 8 | "Payload" | Bernard Kowalski | Daniel Freudenberger | March 9, 1984 |
The team has been assigned to transport a new gene splicing experiment, making it a target of a company which stands to lose millions if the experiment is a success. Guest stars include Belinda Montgomery, Ray Wise and Thomas Callaway.
| 9 | "The Long Flight" | Phil Bondelli | Fred McKnight | March 16, 1984 |
A Mexican drug lord kidnaps Captain Braddock's daughter Amy (played by Kelly Preston) and demands Blue Thunder as a ransom. Other guest stars include Gregory Sierra, Liz Torres and Wayne Heffley.
| 10 | "The Godchild" | Guy Magar | John Thomas James, Richard Danus, Peter Collins | March 23, 1984 |
Chaney must convince the granddaughter of a dead mobster to turn her grandfather's business documents over to the FBI before his old business associates kill her to get them. Guest stars include Maia Brewton, Robert Viharo and Victor Arnold.
| 11 | "The Island" | Earl Bellamy | S : Dan O'Bannon, Don Jakoby, John Fransic O'Hara; T : James Patrick | April 16, 1984 |
The team journeys to a small Caribbean island to prevent American mercenaries, who have been hired by the KGB, from killing the Prime Minister. Guest stars include Carolyn Seymour, Ken Foree, Thalmus Rasulala, Robert DoQui and Frank Parker.

== US television ratings ==
| Season | Episodes | Premiered: | Ended: | Nielsen rank | Nielsen rating |
|---|---|---|---|---|---|
| 1983–84 | 11 | January 6, 1984 | April 16, 1984 | 60 | 14.2 |

== Home media ==
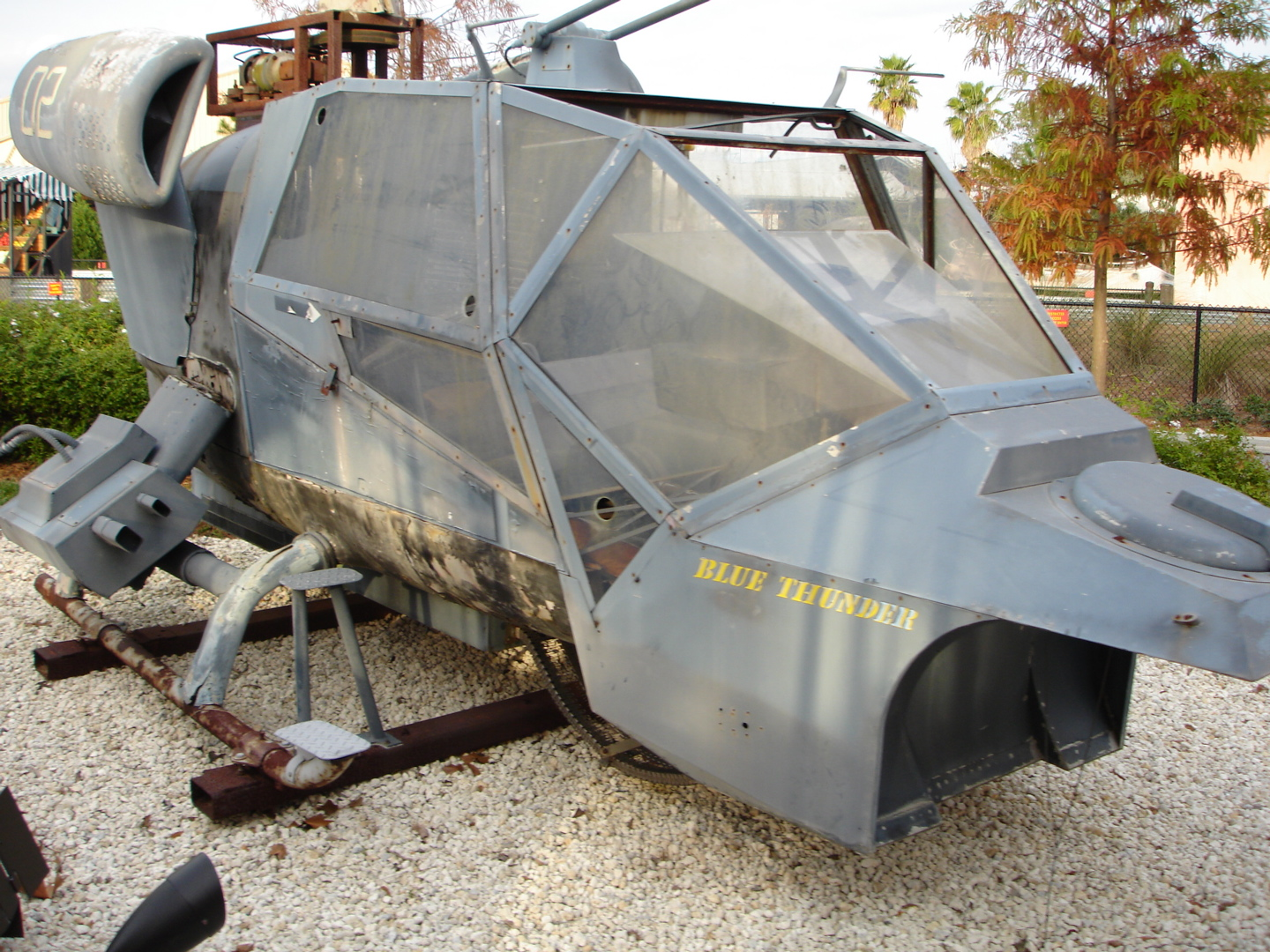
A mock-up of the Blue Thunder helicopter, as seen on the back lot tour of Disney Hollywood Studios, Florida

Sony Pictures Home Entertainment released the complete series on DVD in Region 1 on August 22, 2006. A Region 2 release followed on September 27, 2010.
