= Tom McNamara =

Tom McNamara may refer to:

- Tom McNamara (Gaelic footballer) (1872–1944), Irish Gaelic footballer
- Tom McNamara (footballer, born 1874) (1874–1936), Australian rules footballer for St Kilda
- Tom McNamara (golfer) (1882–1939), American golfer
- Tom McNamara (director) (1886–1964), American film director
- Tom McNamara (baseball) (1895–1974), American baseball player
- Tom McNamara (American football) (1897–1966), American football player
- Tom McNamara (politician) (born 1983), American politician, current mayor of Rockford, Illinois
- Tom McNamara (footballer, born 1990), Australian rules footballer for Melbourne

== See also ==
- Thomas McNamara (disambiguation)
