= Thomas McNamara =

Thomas McNamara may refer to:

- Thomas Francis McNamara (1867–1947), Irish Roman Catholic ecclesiastical architect
- Thomas William McNamara (1926–2020), United States Navy admiral
- Thomas E. McNamara (born 1940), United States diplomat and State Department official
- Tommy McNamara (born 1991), American professional soccer player

== See also ==
- Tom McNamara (disambiguation)
- Thomas Macnamara (1861–1931), British teacher, educationalist and Liberal politician
