= The Daytrippers =

1996 film by Greg Mottola

- Theatrical release poster
- Directed by: Greg Mottola
- Written by: Greg Mottola
- Produced by: Nancy Tenenbaum; Steven Soderbergh; Larry Kamerman; David Heyman; Campbell Scott
- Starring: Hope Davis; Pat McNamara; Anne Meara; Parker Posey; Liev Schreiber; Campbell Scott; Stanley Tucci
- Cinematography: John Inwood
- Edited by: Anne McCabe
- Music by: Richard Martinez
- Production companies: Alliance Communications; Cinepix Film Properties; Fiasco Photoplays; Trick Productions
- Distributed by: Ciné 360 (Canada); Cinepix Film Properties (United States)
- Release dates: January 1996 (Slamdance Film Festival); September 14, 1996 (TIFF); March 5, 1997 (United States)
- Running time: 87 minutes
- Countries: Canada; United States
- Language: English
- Box office: $2 million

The Daytrippers is a 1996 independent comedy-drama film written and directed by Greg Mottola in his feature directorial debut. It stars Hope Davis, Pat McNamara, Stanley Tucci, Anne Meara, Parker Posey and Liev Schreiber.

== Plot ==
The morning after Thanksgiving, Eliza Malone discovers a love letter including a poem that suggests that her husband Louis D'Amico is having an affair with a woman named Sandy. She decides to go to his office in New York City and confront him. Her family, including her parents Jim and Rita, her sister Jo, and Jo's live-in boyfriend Carl Petrovic, come with her in the family station wagon for the drive from Long Island. On the way, Carl talks about the book that he's writing, a surrealist story about a man with a dog's head who uses the fame from his deformity to find an audience for his political beliefs.

Eliza and Rita first try to find Louis at his publishing office in the city. Eliza goes to find his boss, and while waiting, she runs into Eddie Masler, a writer who tells her that the poem featured in the letter is called "The Definition of Love". Louis's boss finally comes to tell her that Louis is out for the day but expected to attend a book release party that evening. Rita then decides to search his office for evidence and finds a photo of him at a birthday party with a woman. The family find the location of the apartment in the photograph based on a restaurant visible in the background. Eliza redials recently called numbers on Louis's desk phone and reaches the voicemail box of "Sandy and Monica".

Eliza and her family drive to the apartment in the photo. Eliza examines the buzzers and sees the names Sandy and Monica on one. While waiting, they see Louis and the woman from the picture getting into a cab. They try to follow the cab, but lose it at a red light. Rita gets out of the car to chase the cab down, but passes out on the sidewalk. Carl asks a stranger taking out the trash from a nearby apartment building for help, and he agrees to let them inside. He and his father, who seem kind, help Eliza's family. Rita declares she will make lunch to thank them for their hospitality. While Eliza and the son shop for lunch ingredients, he tells Eliza that his father doesn't pay alimony for his other kids, and that he is essentially harboring a fugitive.

Eliza's family head to the party, seeking Louis. Carl and Jo go inside to search while Eliza and their parents stay in the car. At the party, there is no sign of Louis, but the two run into Eddie there. Jo and Eddie talk as Carl leaves to try to say hello to an old writing teacher of his; he catches up to him getting into a cab, but the man stares into his face and grimly says nothing before leaving. In Carl's absence, Jo and Eddie grow attracted to each other. When Carl returns, Jo mentions his beliefs to Eddie, which he finds idiotic, and they argue. Carl and Jo leave the party after finding no sign of Louis, but Jo returns after forgetting her bag. Eddie guides her into the back room, and they kiss before he returns her bag. He asks if he can see her again, and she finds that he wrote his phone number in her address book.

Everyone returns to Sandy's apartment, and Eliza enters, planning to confront them. She is buzzed in and finds a party in progress. While waiting, Jo calls Eddie on a pay phone, lying to Carl that she's checking their answering machine. Carl catches her in the lie and they argue, with Jo saying she hates him. Eliza spots the woman she believes to be Sandy, only to find out that her name is Monica. She goes to the roof and sees Louis kissing the real Sandy, who is a man. Louis sees her before she storms out, and the rest of her family is disgusted upon learning of Louis' betrayal. Rita pulls Eliza into the car, but Jim asks what Eliza wants to do, not Rita. They both tell Rita to shut up. Eliza gets out and argues with Louis, eventually storming off again. Jo chases after Eliza and comforts her; they walk off into the city together.

== Cast ==
- Stanley Tucci as Louis D'Amico
- Hope Davis as Eliza Malone D'Amico
- Pat McNamara as Jim Malone
- Anne Meara as Rita Malone
- Parker Posey as Jo Malone
- Liev Schreiber as Carl Petrovic
- Campbell Scott as Eddie Masler
- Marcia Gay Harden as Libby
- Douglas McGrath as "Chap"
- Marc Grapey as Aaron
- Paul Herman as Leon

== Release ==
The Daytrippers premiered at the Slamdance Film Festival in January 1996 where it won the festival’s first Grand Jury Prize. Fire marshals were called to the theater showing the film, as the audience exceeded capacity. It subsequently screened during International Critic's Week at Cannes, and later competed at the Deauville American Film Festival.

The film was released in the United States on March 5, 1997. The film opened to 52 theaters and grossed $35,988 in its opening weekend. Overall, the film grossed $2,099,677 domestically. It screened at the Hong Kong International Film Festival, and also received a theatrical release in Australia during October 1997.

== Reception ==
On the review aggregator website Rotten Tomatoes, 73% of 26 critics' reviews are positive. The website's consensus reads: "Its modest scale and scabrous sense of humor may feel more punishing than funny for some, but an excellent cast and authentic sense of place make The Daytrippers a smooth ride." On Metacritic, the film has a weighted average score of 73 out of 100 based on 18 critics, which the site labels as "generally favorable" reviews.

Owen Gleiberman of Entertainment Weekly gave it a grade B and compared to the film to David O. Russell's Flirting With Disaster but praised director Mottola as having "a lighter, warmer touch" and that he "keeps the action flowing and gets lively work" from the cast.

On March 28, 1997, Desson Howe of The Washington Post remarked that "The Daytrippers proves that a great movie isn’t a matter of dollars, so much as creativity." In April 1997, Robin Dougherty of Salon also gave it a positive review, calling it "well-crafted", and commenting that "despite the bite independent films took of last year's Oscar field, our movie industry — and our movie-going habits — aren't really supportive of writer-directors whose scope is that of a short-story teller rather than an epic mythmaker." Janet Maslin of The New York Times commented that "the main action of The Daytrippers is bright, real and even poignant enough to make this journey worth the ride." Maslin also praised Posey's performance, commenting that "Jo is played by Parker Posey once again [as] the apotheosis of blase cool."

A negative review at the time came from Siskel and Ebert, who gave the film two thumbs down on the March 8, 1997 episode of their program. Gene Siskel questioned why the movie was even made in the first place, while Roger Ebert commented that, "I got real tired of these characters, they were all whiney and negative [...] they get old real fast, especially Anne Meara."

== Awards ==
Awards and nominations for Daytrippers
Year	Award	Category	Recipient	Result	Ref.
1996	Cannes Film Festival	Golden Camera	Greg Mottola	Nominated	
1996	Deauville Film Festival	Grand Special Prize	Greg Mottola	Won	
1996	Deauville Film Festival	Prix du Public	Greg Mottola	Won	
1996	National Board of Review	Special Recognition	Greg Mottola	Won	
1996	Slamdance Film Festival	Audience Award	Greg Mottola	Won	
1996	Slamdance Film Festival	Grand Jury Prize	Greg Mottola	Won	
1996	Toronto International Film Festival	FIPRESCI - Special Mention	Greg Mottola	Won	
