= Joseph McNamara =

Joseph McNamara may refer to:

- Joseph McNamara (Ontario politician) (1888–?)
- Joseph McNamara (Rhode Island politician) (born 1950), member of the Rhode Island House of Representatives
- Joseph McNamara (Virginia politician) (born 1963), member of the Virginia House of Delegates
- Joseph A. McNamara (1892–1972), Vermont attorney and politician
- Joseph D. McNamara (1935–2014), police chief of Kansas City, Missouri, and San Jose, California
- Joe McNamara, property developer and protester in Ireland
- Kevin McNamara (politician) (Joseph Kevin McNamara, 1934–2017), British Labour Party politician
