= Wesley Wildman =

Australian American philosopher, theologian, and ethicist

The Reverend Wesley Wildman
- Born: Wesley J. Wildman; 1961 (age 64–65); Adelaide, South Australia, Australia

Ecclesiastical career
- Religion: Christianity
- Church: Uniting Church in Australia
- Ordained: 1986

Academic background
- Education: Flinders University; University of Sydney; Graduate Theological Union
- Thesis: The Quest for a Believable Jesus (1993)
- Influences: Robert Neville; Friedrich Schleiermacher; John Searle; Huston Smith; Paul Tillich

Academic work
- Discipline: Philosophy; theology
- Institutions: Boston University
- Main interests: Relationship between religion and science
- Website: wesleywildman.com

Wesley J. Wildman (born 1961) is a contemporary Australian-American philosopher, theologian, ethicist, and computational social scientist. He is dually appointed as a full professor at Boston University, in the School of Theology and in the Faculty of Computing and Data Sciences (where he is an Inaugural Duan Family Faculty Fellow). He is founding co-editor of the journal Religion, Brain & Behavior (published by Taylor & Francis). A nonprofit entrepreneur since 2007, he is founder, past executive director, and current chief scientist at Just Horizons Alliance, which describes itself as "a nonprofit research and innovation platform that equips people and institutions to lead with clarity, courage, and compassion in moving humanity towards a more just and hopeful future."

As a philosopher of religion, Wildman's scholarly work has focused on interpreting religious and non-religious worldviews and lifeways, and building theories of beliefs, behaviors, and experiences that acknowledge value in longstanding religious wisdom traditions while attempting to remain intellectually viable in light of the biological, cognitive, evolutionary, physical, and social sciences. He is an important figure in the religion and science field, along with scholars such as Robert John Russell, Nancey Murphy, and John Polkinghorne.

As a computational social scientist, Wildman's research focuses on computational modeling of complex adaptive social systems, aiming both to deepen understanding of seeming intractable social problems (such as religious extremist violence) and to evaluate social policies designed to mitigate human suffering (with projects on rural suicide, exploitation of children in the commercial sex industry, dynamics of ideological polarization, patterns of religious change, cultivation of virtues among tech-immersed young people, and numerous other topics). He has also been a leader in digital ethics, helping Boston University develop ethical guidelines to address the increasingly prominent role of generative AI in education.

== Background ==
Wesley Wildman was born in Adelaide, South Australia. He studied mathematics, computer science, and physics at Flinders University, receiving a Bachelor of Arts degree in 1980 and a first-class honours degree in pure mathematics in 1981. After studying divinity at the University of Sydney, he earned a PhD in philosophy of religion in 1993 from the Graduate Theological Union in Berkeley, California, taking most of his classes in the University of California at Berkeley's philosophy department with John Searle and Hubert Dreyfus, while being a teaching assistant to Huston Smith on four occasions through UC Berkeley's religious studies program. He was appointed to a professorial position at Boston University in 1993. Currently, he lives in suburban Boston.

== Career ==
Though trained in religious studies generally, Wildman's scholarly work initially focused on one religious tradition, Christianity, especially its beliefs and worldviews. His first book, Fidelity with Plausibility (1998), analysed the plausibility of central Christian beliefs in the context of the contemporary physical and human sciences and the history of encounter with the other religions. Since then, Wildman's philosophy of religion has broadened as he has attempted to interpret religion as a social, cultural, and evolutionary phenomenon. This broadening has included a longstanding interest in the comparative study of world religious traditions and involvement in a series of publications on interdisciplinary methodology and practice spanning the humanities and sciences as they relate to religion.

The definitive expression of Wildman's philosophy is his six-volume Religious Philosophy series. The first volume, Religious Philosophy as Multidisciplinary Comparative Inquiry, outlines a program for revitalizing the philosophy of religion by making it consistently comparative—attending to all human religions rather than advocating on behalf of one favored tradition—and massively multidisciplinary, drawing insights from the scientific, social scientific, and humanistic inquiries that bear upon questions in philosophy of religion. Volume two, In Our Own Image, provides a systematic comparative analysis of the relative strengths and weaknesses of three classes of ultimacy models: agential-being models that conceive God as a person with intentions and agency, subordinate-deity models such as process theism that conceive God as less than ultimate, and ground-of-being models that eschew theological anthropomorphism and identify God with nature's valuational depths. Not yet published, the third volume, Science and Ultimate Reality, will continue the second volume's reverent comparative competition between ultimacy models, now focusing on how fundamental physics and biology differentially impact the plausibility of ultimacy models. Volume four, Science and Religious Anthropology, considers the impact of contemporary physics and biology upon different religious conceptions of the human person and argues for a religious naturalist theological anthropology that affirms the reality, meaningfulness, and supreme value of human religious quests, while denying that supernatural entities are needed to understand human religiousness. The fifth volume, Religious and Spiritual Experiences, interprets religious and spiritual experiences as intense and profoundly meaningful, yet naturalistically grounded in brains and bodies and capable of being enhanced and controlled with a variety of technologies, old and new. Volume six, Effing the Ineffable, explores how we use religious language to make sense of the most profound aspects of human experience and to plumb the mystical depths of reality, conceiving the inconceivable and saying the unsayable.

Wildman also publishes trade nonfiction, such as Spirit Tech: The Brave New World of Consciousness Hacking and Enlightenment Engineering (with Kate Stockly); spiritual meditations on mysticism, such as God Is… Meditations on the Mystery of Life, the Purity of Grace, the Bliss of Surrender, and the God Beyond God; and works of fiction, such as The Winding Way Home.

Along with neurologist Patrick McNamara, also at Boston University, Wildman founded the nonprofit Institute for the Biocultural Study of Religion in 2007, an independent scientific research institute that pursues research and public outreach on the scientific study of religious and non-religious worldviews and lifeways. In 2011, the Institute began publication of Religion, Brain, & Behavior, a peer-reviewed academic journal whose advisory board includes such figures as biological anthropologist human evolutionary biologist Joseph Henrich, religion scholar Ann Taves, sociologist of religion Nancy Ammerman, and many of the leading figures in the scientific study of religion and the cognitive science of religion. In 2016, Wildman founded the nonprofit Center for Mind and Culture, a non-profit research institute that uses computer modelling and data analytics to tackle complex social problems such as child trafficking, religious radicalization, proliferation of weapons of mass destruction, social integration of immigrants and refugees, and many other critical issues arising out of the “mind-culture nexus.” In 2022, Wildman founded Wildhouse Publishing, a "nonprofit independent publisher that exists to enliven the spiritual quests of people outside or on the margins of established religious and spiritual traditions". A small indie press, Wildhouse Publishing has fiction, nonfiction, and poetry imprints. In 2024, the Institute for the Biocultural Study of Religion, the Center for Mind and Culture, Wildhouse Publishing, and several other initiatives merged under an umbrella nonprofit organization, Just Horizons Alliance, which is dedicated to "fusing knowledge and wisdom for a more just and hopeful future." Just Horizons Alliance conducts academic research, produces an AI ethics curriculum, publishes books on expansive spirituality for a secular and increasingly post-religious age, and catalyzes conversations among thought leaders.

Wildman is also known for pastoral research into ideological differences in Christian denominations, particularly the theoretical and practical meaning of the distinctions among liberal, evangelical, and moderate Protestants in the United States. This work has led to books such as Lost in the Middle: Claiming an Inclusive Faith for Christians Who Are Both Liberal and Evangelical, and Found in the Middle: Theology and Ethics for Christians Who Are Both Liberal and Evangelical. His work in this area has been influenced by such figures as Protestant theologians Friedrich Schleiermacher and Paul Tillich, comparative religion scholar Huston Smith, and philosophers John Searle and Robert Neville.

Wildman is a founding member of the International Society for Science and Religion, and a longtime member of the American Theological Society (serving as its president in 2016–2017), the American Academy of Religion, the Society for the Scientific Study of Religion, the American Association for the Advancement of Science, and the Religious Naturalist Association. A festschrift on Wildman's work was published by SUNY Press in 2022: LeRon Shults and Robert Cummings Neville, eds., Religion in Multidisciplinary Perspective: Philosophical, Theological, and Scientific Approaches to Wesley J. Wildman. A special journal issue dedicated to his work was published in the American Journal of Philosophy and Theology in 2024. Wildman was invited to deliver an intellectual autobiography at the annual meeting of the Institute for American Religious and Philosophical Thought in 2021.

== Selected publications ==
- Religion and Science: History, Method, Dialogue, ed. with W. Mark Richardson (New York: Routledge, Inc., 1996)
- Fidelity with Plausibility: Modest Christologies in the Twentieth Century (Albany: SUNY Press, 1998)
- Encyclopedia of Science and Religion, 2 vols., edited with Niels Gregersen and Nancy Howell, Chief Editor, Wentzel van Huyssteen (New York: Macmillan Reference, 2003)
- Lost in the Middle? Claiming an Inclusive Faith for Christians Who Are Both Liberal and Evangelical (Alban Institute, 2009)
- Found in the Middle! Theology and Ethics for Christians Who Are Both Liberal and Evangelical (Alban Institute, 2009)
- Science and Religious Anthropology: A Spiritually Evocative Naturalist Interpretation of Human Life (Aldershot, UK: Ashgate, 2009)
- Religious Philosophy as Multidisciplinary Comparative Inquiry: Envisioning a Future for the Philosophy of Religion (Albany: State University of New York Press, 2010)
- Religious and Spiritual Experiences (Cambridge: Cambridge University Press, 2011)
- Science and the World’s Religions, 3 vols., edited with Patrick McNamara (Praeger, 2012)
- In Our Own Image: Anthropomorphism, Apophaticism, and Ultimacy (Oxford: Oxford University Press, 2017)
- Effing the Ineffable: Existential Mumblings at the Limits of Language (Albany, NY: State University of New York Press, 2018)
- God is ... Meditations on the Mystery of Life, the Purity of Grace, the Bliss of Surrender, and the God Beyond God (Eugene, OR: Wipf and Stock, 2019)
- Spirit Tech: The Brave New World of Consciousness Hacking and Enlightenment Engineering (St. Martin's Press, 2021)
- The Winding Way Home (Boston, MA: Wildhouse Publications, 2023)
- Wesley J. Wildman and F. LeRon Shults, Modeling Religion: Simulating the Transformation of Worldviews, Lifeways, and Civilizations (London, UK: Bloomsbury Publishing, forthcoming, 2024).
