= Paul Herman =

American actor (1946–2022)

- Born: March 29, 1946; New York City, U.S.
- Died: March 29, 2022 (aged 76); New York City, U.S.
- Occupation: Actor
- Years active: 1982–2021
- Television: The Sopranos

Paul Herman (March 29, 1946 – March 29, 2022) was an American actor. He was best known for playing "Beansie" Gaeta in HBO's The Sopranos, Randy in David O. Russell's dramedy Silver Linings Playbook (2012) and Whispers (the other Whispers) DiTullio in Martin Scorsese's crime epic The Irishman (2019).

== Career ==
His other appearances in movies include Once Upon a Time in America, At Close Range, We Own the Night, Heat, Crazy Heart, Quick Change, Sleepers, Cop Land, The Fan, Analyze That, The Day Trippers, and American Hustle. He had a recurring role on The Sopranos as Peter "Beansie" Gaeta, as well as another HBO series, Entourage, as Vincent Chase's accountant, Marvin.

Herman also played minor background characters in two other Scorsese crime films. In Goodfellas, he was The Pittsburgh Connection, and in the montage sequence 'Back Home, Years Ago' in Scorsese's Casino, he was a gambler who rushes to the phone booth to place the same bet that Sam Rothstein (Robert De Niro) did.

In 2009's Crazy Heart, Herman played the manager of Jeff Bridges' character.

Herman received a Screen Actors Guild Award and Critics Choice Award as part of the ensemble cast of 2013's American Hustle.

== Personal life ==
Herman was born in Brooklyn, New York City to an Italian-American mother and Ashkenazi Jewish father. He, along with his brother Charlie, ran the Columbus Cafe in the 1990s. Located across from Lincoln Center, it was frequented by actors, ballet dancers, gangsters, and FBI and DEA agents. Herman also had a small ownership stake in the cafe, along with Mikhail Baryshnikov as well as other actors.

== Death ==
Herman died on his 76th birthday on March 29, 2022.

== Filmography ==
=== Film ===
Paul Herman' film credits
| Year | Title | Role | Notes |
|---|---|---|---|
| 1982 | Dear Mr. Wonderful | Hesh | |
| 1983 | Easy Money | Bar Owner | |
| 1984 | Once Upon a Time in America | Monkey | |
| 1984 | Falling in Love | Engineer | |
| 1984 | The Cotton Club | Policeman #1 | |
| 1985 | The Purple Rose of Cairo | The Penny Pitcher | |
| 1986 | At Close Range | Salesman | |
| 1986 | The Color of Money | Player in Casino Bar | |
| 1987 | The Squeeze | Freddy | |
| 1988 | The Big Blue | Taxi Driver In U.S.A | |
| 1988 | The Last Temptation of Christ | Philip the Apostle | |
| 1988 | Big | Schizo | |
| 1989 | New York Stories | Detective Flynn / Clifford the Doorman / Cop | (segments "Life Lessons" - "Life without Zoe" - "Oedipus Wrecks") |
| 1989 | White Hot | Vinnie | |
| 1989 | Rooftops | Jimmy | |
| 1989 | Next of Kin | Lieutenant Tony Antonelli | |
| 1990 | Cadillac Man | Tony DiPino | |
| 1990 | Quick Change | Interrogating Policeman | |
| 1990 | Goodfellas | Dealer | |
| 1991 | Billy Bathgate | Dutch's Thug | |
| 1992 | In the Soup | E-Z Rent-A-Car Clerk | |
| 1994 | Somebody to Love | "Pinky" | |
| 1995 | Terrified | Toughguy | |
| 1995 | Mighty Aphrodite | Ricky's Friend | |
| 1995 | Casino | Gambler In Phone Booth | |
| 1995 | Heat | Sergeant Heinz | |
| 1996 | The Daytrippers | Leon | Independent film |
| 1996 | The Fan | Seedy Suit Guy | |
| 1996 | Sleepers | Court Bailiff | |
| 1997 | Fathers' Day | Mr. Barmore | |
| 1997 | Trading Favors | The Bartender | |
| 1997 | Cop Land | Carnival Worker | |
| 1997 | Top of the World | The Valet | |
| 1997 | Hugo Pool | The Rabbi | |
| 1998 | Starstruck | Saul Spengler | |
| 1998 | Enemy of the State | Carlos | Uncredited |
| 2001 | 15 Minutes | Detective Paulie | |
| 2002 | Analyze That | Joey Boots | |
| 2007 | We Own the Night | Lieutenant Spiro Giavannis | |
| 2008 | What Just Happened | Jerry | |
| 2009 | Crazy Heart | Jack Greene | |
| 2010 | Little Fockers | Caricature Artist | |
| 2012 | Silver Linings Playbook | Randy | |
| 2013 | American Hustle | Alfonse Simone | Screen Actors Guild Award for Outstanding Performance by a Cast in a Motion Picture |
| 2015 | Joy | Rifle Man | |
| 2019 | The Irishman | Whispers (the other Whispers) DiTullio | Final film role |

=== Television ===
Paul Herman's television credits
| Year | Title | Role | Notes |
|---|---|---|---|
| 1985 | Brass | Uniformed Officer | Television movie |
| 1985 | Our Family Honor | —N/a | Episode: "Pilot" |
| 1985 | The Equalizer | Ben | Episode: "Back Home" |
| 1986 | One Life to Live | Axel | Episode "#1.4638" |
| 1986 | Spenser: For Hire | Morgan Evans | Episode: "And Give Up Show Biz?" |
| 1987 | Saturday Night Live | Bowler | Episode: "Charlton Heston/Wynton Marsalis"; Uncredited |
| 1988 | Miami Vice | Jimmy Roth | Episode: "Blood & Roses" |
| 1997 | On the Line | Detective Ed Carlin | Television movie |
| 2000–2007 | The Sopranos | Peter "Beansie" Gaeta | 5 episodes |
| 2004–2010 | Entourage | Marvin | 6 episodes |
