= Bill McNamara =

Australian rules footballer

Personal information
- Full name: William Healy McNamara
- Nickname: Snowy
- Born: 8 June 1876; Port Fairy, Victoria
- Died: 21 November 1959 (aged 83); Parkville, Victoria
- Original team: Brunswick
- Position: Wingman

Playing career^{1}
Years	Club	Games (Goals)	
1899–1904	Carlton	69 (8)	

Umpiring career
Years	League	Role	Games
1905–1908	VFL	Field umpire	3
1905–1915	VFL	Boundary umpire	101
- ^{1} Playing statistics correct to the end of 1904.

William Healy McNamara (8 June 1876 – 21 November 1959) was an Australian rules footballer who played for Carlton in the Victorian Football League (VFL).

== Family ==
One of the ten children of John Joseph McNamara (1843-1921), and, Catherine Mary McNamara (1848-1914), née Enright, William Healy McNamara was born at Port Fairy, Victoria on 8 June 1876.

He married Honorah Teresa Barrett (1876-1937) in 1900. They had six children; one of whom, William Patrick McNamara (1912–1983), played VFL football for both Melbourne and South Melbourne.

== Football ==
McNamara was a wingman at Carlton for six seasons; he left the club after not being picked for the 1904 finals. As a result, he missed out on playing in the successful team which won three successive premierships from 1906 to 1908.

== Umpire ==
He was, also, a VFL umpire; officiating in 104 games, mostly as a boundary umpire. He was on the boundary in the 1910 VFL Grand Final.

== Death ==
He died at the Royal Melbourne Hospital, Parkville, Victoria on 21 November 1959.
