= Tom McNamara (Gaelic footballer) =

Irish Gaelic footballer

Thomas McNamara (1872 – 5 October 1944) was an Irish Gaelic footballer. His championship career with the Limerick senior team lasted three seasons from 1887 until 1889.

McNamara made his inter-county debut during the 1887 championship when the Commercials club represented Limerick in the inaugural championship. He won his sole All-Ireland medal that year as Limerick defeated Louth in the final.

== Honours ==
Limerick

- All-Ireland Senior Football Championship (1): 1887
