= Pat McNamara (actor) =

American film, stage and television actor

- McNamara in Cagney & Lacey: The Return, 1994
- Born: Patrick Sarsfield McNamara; July 22, 1933; New York, U.S.
- Died: January 5, 2024 (aged 90); Santa Monica, California, U.S.
- Occupations: Film, stage and television actor

Patrick Sarsfield McNamara (July 22, 1933 – January 5, 2024) was an American film, stage and television actor. He was best known for playing Jim Malone, Eliza's weary father in the 1996 film The Daytrippers.

== Life and career ==
McNamara was born in New York, the son of John McNamara and Elizabeth Betty Sarsfield. His father was from Ireland, and his mother was from England. He attended and graduated from William Cullen Bryant High School. After graduating, he served in the United States Navy during the Korean War. He began his screen career in 1966, appearing in the ABC Gothic soap opera television series Dark Shadows. In 1975, he appeared in the television film Dead Man on the Run, and in 1976, he played Officer Rollock in the stage play The Poison Tree.

Later in his career, McNamara guest-starred in television programs including Barney Miller, Archie Bunker's Place, Soap, M*A*S*H, Party of Five, Oz and Homicide: Life on the Street. In 1996, he starred as Jim Malone, Eliza's weary father in the film The Daytrippers, starring along with Hope Davis, Stanley Tucci, Anne Meara, Parker Posey and Liev Schreiber. He also appeared in the films such as The Silence of the Lambs, Fight Club, Blue Thunder, Airplane II: The Sequel, The Squeeze and Commandments.

McNamara retired from acting in 2022, last appearing in the film Street to Table.

== Death ==
McNamara died on January 5, 2024, in Santa Monica, California, at the age of 90.
