= Robert McNamara (disambiguation) =

Robert McNamara (1916–2009) was an American business executive and secretary of defense.

Robert or Bob McNamara may also refer to:

- Bob McNamara (baseball) (1916–2011), American infielder and shortstop
- Bob McNamara (Canadian football) (1931–2014), American running back and defensive back
- Bob McNamara (sports executive) (born 1961), Canadian general manager of Grand Rapids Griffins
- Robert H. McNamara (born 1965), American golfer, winner of 1986 and 1989 Kentucky Open, a/k/a Rob McNamara
- Robert McNamara (figure skater) (born 1987), Australian winner of national title in 2009–10 season
- Robbie McNamara (born 1989), Irish jockey, winner of 2014 Champion Bumper
- Robert Craig McNamara (born 1950), American farmer and activist, son of Robert McNamara
