= LAPD Hooper Heliport =

City-owned private-use heliport in Los Angeles, CA, US

Jay Stephen Hooper Memorial Heliport
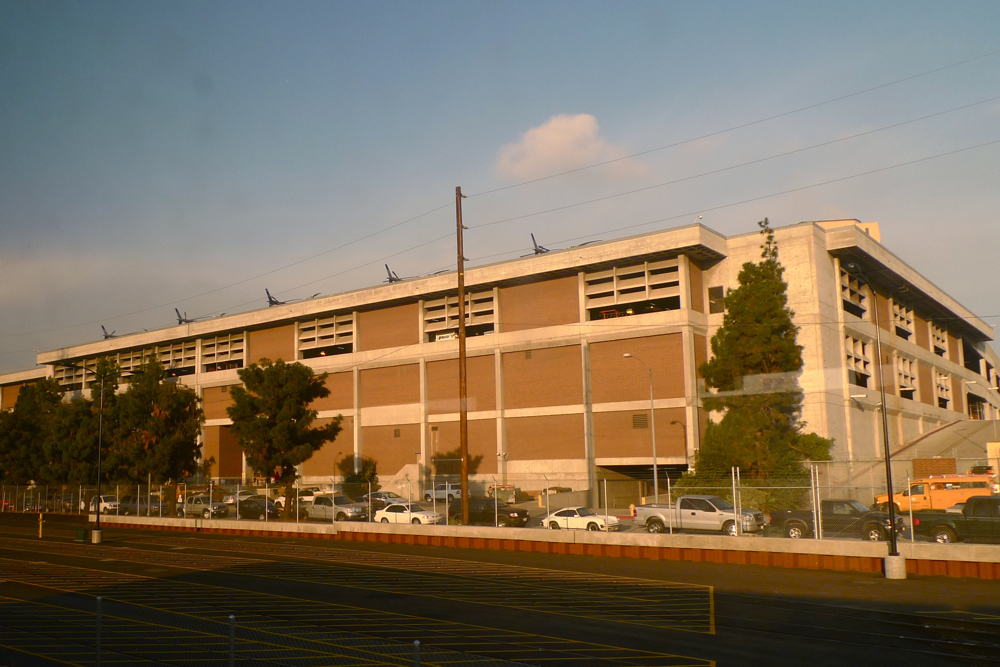
- IATA: none; ICAO: none; FAA LID: 58CA

Summary
- Airport type: Private
- Owner: City of Los Angeles
- Location: Los Angeles, California
- Elevation AMSL: 353 ft (108 m)
- Coordinates: 34.05438°N 118.22953°W
- Interactive map of Jay Stephen Hooper Memorial Heliport

Helipads
Number	Length		Surface
Number	ft	m	Surface
H1	600	183	Concrete

Statistics
- Based aircraft: 17
- Source: Federal Aviation Administration

LAPD Hooper Heliport (FAA LID: 58CA) is a city-owned private-use heliport located one nautical mile (2 km) northeast of the central business district of Los Angeles, in Los Angeles County, California, United States.

== History ==
Hooper Heliport is located on the roof of the C. Erwin Piper Technical Center, the world's largest rooftop airport. It is centrally located next to Los Angeles Union Station. It is home to the Los Angeles Police Department's Air Support Division which is the largest metropolitan police aviation unit in the U.S. with 17 helicopters and 1 fixed wing aircraft

== See also ==
- LAPD Air Support Division
- List of airports in the Los Angeles area
- Police aviation
