= The Squeeze (1987 film) =

1987 American action comedy film

- Theatrical release poster
- Directed by: Roger Young
- Written by: Daniel Taplitz
- Produced by: Rupert Hitzig; Michael Tannen
- Starring: Michael Keaton; Rae Dawn Chong; Joe Pantoliano
- Cinematography: Arthur Albert
- Edited by: Harry Keramidas
- Music by: Miles Goodman
- Production companies: Tri-Star Pictures; ML Delphi Premier Productions; Tannen-Hitzig Productions
- Distributed by: Tri-Star Pictures
- Release date: July 10, 1987
- Running time: 101 minutes
- Country: United States
- Language: English
- Budget: $22 million
- Box office: $2,228,951

The Squeeze is a 1987 American action comedy film directed by Roger Young and starring Michael Keaton and Rae Dawn Chong. The film was plagued by production problems, including going over budget.

== Plot ==
After retrieving a mysterious parcel for his ex-wife, eccentric down-on-his-luck artist Harry Berg enlists the help of private eye Rachel Dobs when he suddenly becomes embroiled with thugs and a murder investigation. The combination of Harry's many comic eccentricities and Rachel's straight-and-narrow, naive personality ends up working in their favor to help solve the crime.

== Cast ==
- Michael Keaton as Harry Berg
- Rae Dawn Chong as Rachel Dobs
- Joe Pantoliano as Norman
- Meat Loaf as Titus
- John Davidson as Honest Tom T. Murray
- Danny Aiello III as Ralph Vigo
- Leslie Bevis as Gem Vigo
- Liane Langland as Hilda
- Richard Portnow as Ruben
- Paul Herman as Freddy

== Release ==
Originally produced as Skip Tracer, this film changed its title to Squeeze Play before settling for The Squeeze. The working title refers to someone who tracks down delinquent bill payers. When released in theaters, The Squeeze made only $2.2 million at the U.S. box office. It is most notable for an accident that took place during filming, in which a stunt man was killed driving a car into the Hudson River.

An updated version of the film was briefly released on Netflix, and Comcast had an HD version On Demand in 2008. After being long out-of-print on home media for years, Sony Pictures Home Entertainment released The Squeeze on Blu-ray on March 26, 2019.

== Reception ==
Despite billing itself as "the comedy on a lucky streak", the film failed to score with most critics. Film historian Leonard Maltin called it "Dreadful...almost completely devoid of laughs or suspense." On an episode of the movie review show At the Movies, critics Gene Siskel and Roger Ebert panned the film, but humorously had a difficult time discerning the plot. The Squeeze holds a 14% rating on Rotten Tomatoes based on seven reviews.

The theatrical poster of the film shows Michael Keaton being squeezed between the twin towers of the World Trade Center by a giant hand. The poster was retrospectively described by MovieJawn as "perhaps the most memorable thing" associated with the film.
