= Joseph D. McNamara =

Chief of police of San Jose, California from 1976 to 1991

- Police career
- Department: San Jose Police Department
- Service years: San Jose P.D.: 1976-1991; Kansas City P.D.: 1973-1976
- Rank: Chief of the San Jose P.D., Chief of the Kansas City P.D.

Joseph D. McNamara (1935–2014) was the chief of police of San Jose, California from 1976 to 1991. He was known for professionalizing the police force, encouraging community policing, applying crime data, criticizing the war on drugs, and eventually advocating the legalization of marijuana.

McNamara attended the John Jay College of Criminal Justice and earned a doctorate from the Harvard Kennedy School.

McNamara began his career in Harlem as a beat cop. He was chief of the Kansas City Police Department from 1973 to 1976.

McNamara was one of the highest ranking American police officers to turn his experiences into fiction. His debut novel, The First Directive, introduced Detective Sergeant Finnbar Fraleigh, a homicide detective in a large, unnamed city in the South Bay Area, clearly modeled on San Jose. In McNamara's second novel, Fatal Command, Fraleigh has left his old job to become Chief of Detectives for the fictional "Silicon City," which is apparently an amalgamation of all the incorporated municipalities south of the San Mateo County line, and north of San Jose, along with all the unincorporated area in-between, into one large major metropolis. By his third appearance in The Blue Mirage, Fraleigh is the Acting Police Chief of Silicon City. McNamara's fourth novel, Code 211 Blue, is set in San Francisco, and depicts an SFPD detective trying to solve his partner's murder. McNamara's final novel, the self-published Love and Death in Silicon Valley features Rusty Carter, the retired sheriff of Silicon Valley County (a fictionalized Santa Clara County), trying to find out why, since he is no longer an active police officer, organized crime elements are trying to murder him.
