= Jordan Grafman =

American neuropsychologist

- Born: Jordan Henry Grafman; December 21, 1950 (age 75)
- Education: University of Wisconsin–Madison
- Awards: Humboldt Research Award (2011)
- Scientific career
- Fields: Neuropsychology
- Workplaces: Northwestern University
- Thesis: Long and Short-Term Memory Processes in Cortically Damaged Patients (1981)

Jordan Henry Grafman (born December 21, 1950) is an American neuropsychologist who serves as Professor of Physical Medicine and Rehabilitation in the Feinberg School of Medicine at Northwestern University. He is also the Director of Brain Injury Research at the Shirley Ryan AbilityLab. Before joining Northwestern and the Shirley Ryan AbilityLab, Grafman served as the director of Traumatic Brain Injury Research at the Kessler Foundation. He also served as Chief of the Cognitive Neuroscience Section at the National Institute of Neurological Disorders and Stroke. His research primarily focuses on investigating the functions of the human prefrontal cortex using a wide variety of methods, including magnetic resonance imaging, psychophysiological techniques, and genetic research. He was awarded a Humboldt Research Award in 2011.
