= Patrick McNamara (neuroscientist) =

American neuroscientist

- Born: 1956 (age 69–70)
- Alma mater: Boston University (BA 1986, PhD 1991); Saint Joseph's College of Maine (2013)
- Known for: Research on the neuroscience of religious experience, dreaming and Parkinson's disease; co-founder of the Institute for the Biocultural Study of Religion and founding editor of Religion, Brain & Behavior
- Scientific career
- Fields: Neuroscience, Neuropsychology, cognitive neuroscience of religion, sleep and dreams
- Workplaces: National University (professor of psychology); Boston University School of Medicine; VA New England HealthCare System; Northcentral University (dissertation chair)

Patrick McNamara (born 1956) is an American cognitive neuroscientist, neuropsychologist, neurolinguist, psychologist, author and editor. He is a professor of psychology at National University and an Associate Professor of Neurology at the Department of Neurology at the Boston University School of Medicine and the VA New England HealthCare System. His work has centered on three major topics: sleep and dreams, religion, and mind/brain. He is a leading figure in the cognitive neuroscience of religion. He is a founding editor of the journal Religion, Brain & Behavior, which began publishing in 2011, and co-founded the Institute for the Biocultural Study of Religion. In 2022 he led the Northcentral University team on a $6.3 million Templeton Foundation grant, held jointly with the Shirley Ryan AbilityLab under project leader Jordan Grafman, that the announcement described as the largest devoted to the brain basis of religious thought.

== Early life and education ==
Born in 1956, McNamara grew up in Fitchburg, Massachusetts, and was raised Catholic. He dropped out of school at about fifteen and later earned a GED. He then began college at the University of Massachusetts Boston, taking evening courses while working full time as a medic at a detoxification center for alcoholics, where he was first introduced to neuroscience. He then transferred to Boston University, where he received a BA in psychology in 1986 and a PhD in behavioral neuroscience, specializing in human neuropsychology, in 1991. From 1991 to 1993 he was a postdoctoral fellow at the Aphasia Research Center of the Boston VA Medical Center. In 2013 he received a master's degree in theology from Saint Joseph's College of Maine.

== Career ==
Boston University's faculty page describes his work as pioneering the investigation of the frontal lobes' role in religious experience.

McNamara was an assistant professor of psychology at State University College at Buffalo from 1994 to 1996, and from 1996 to 1999 he managed the research department of the Partnership for Organ Donation in Boston. He joined Boston University School of Medicine in 1999 as an assistant professor of behavioral neuroscience, became assistant professor of neurology in 2000, and was associate professor of neurology and psychiatry from 2007 to 2012. He has been a research scientist at the VA New England Healthcare System since 2000, and since 2012 has served as a dissertation chair in the graduate school of Northcentral University.

In February 2022 the John Templeton Foundation awarded Shirley Ryan AbilityLab and Northcentral University a $6.3 million grant to study the brain basis of religious thought. The announcement called it the first large project grant devoted to the topic and the largest in funding. Jordan Grafman of the Shirley Ryan AbilityLab and Northwestern University led the project. McNamara led the team at Northcentral University, which planned to record the brain activity of 150 participants during REM sleep with headband sensors. About $3 million was to support the work at the two institutions, and the rest was to fund projects at other institutions chosen through a request-for-proposals process over three years.

According to his curriculum vitae, McNamara has been principal investigator on several other externally funded projects: a Templeton Foundation award on the neurology of religious cognition (2013 to present, $1,813,766); an NIDCD R01 grant on pragmatic language skills in Parkinson's disease (2007–2010, $1,361,019); an NIH R21 grant on REM and NREM processing specializations (2007–2009, $346,000); an NIMH R01 grant on the phylogeny of sleep ($1,287,077); and a Department of Veterans Affairs Merit Review award on catecholaminergic contributions to cognitive and affective function in Parkinson's disease (2000–2004, $525,000). He was co-principal investigator on an earlier Templeton grant on frontal-lobe mediation of the effects of religiosity on health in the elderly ($150,000).

== Institute and journal ==
In 2007 McNamara and Wesley J. Wildman, a philosopher and theologian at Boston University, co-founded the Institute for the Biocultural Study of Religion, an independent nonprofit. According to BU Today, its mission includes supporting the scientific study of religion and exploring the wider implications of that research through outreach such as its website. The same report said McNamara and Wildman would launch Religion, Brain & Behavior, which it called the field's first scientific journal, with the anthropologist Richard Sosis as co-editor. McNamara's curriculum vitae lists him as a founding editor.

BU Today also reported that McNamara and Wildman were working with Harvard researchers on a project that used methods from evolutionary biology to look for traits linked to violence in Anabaptist sects of the Reformation and in present-day Sunni groups in northeastern Afghanistan.

== Parkinson's disease ==
BU Today reported in 2011 that McNamara became interested in the scientific study of religion in the 1990s while working with patients with Parkinson's disease. He had seen religion bring solace to patients with Alzheimer's disease.

Since 2005 he has directed the Cognition in Parkinson's Disease Lab, based at the VA New England Healthcare System and Boston University School of Medicine. With colleagues he has published studies of religious cognition in Parkinson's patients, including a 2010 paper on deficits in the automatic activation of religious concepts and a 2011 paper on side of symptom onset and changes in religiosity. A project launched in May 2013 at the Boston VA was designed to assess functional brain connectivity, neurochemistry, cognition, and religious experience and practice in 150 patients with Parkinson's disease and 75 controls.

His book The Cognitive Neuropsychiatry of Parkinson's Disease (MIT Press, 2011) covers the non-motor symptoms of the disease, with chapters on speech and language deficits, sleep disorders, mood disorders and apathy, psychosis and dementia, and impulse control disorders. It organizes them around what he calls the agentic self, the self that makes decisions and acts. Reviewing it in Applied Neuropsychology: Adult, Alice Cronin-Golomb of Boston University called it an important addition to the literature on Parkinson's disease and praised its clear organization. She questioned parts of his account of the brain mechanisms, noting that it did not discuss Braak staging.

== Sleep and dreams ==
Boston University's faculty page says McNamara studies the evolution of the two mammalian sleep states, REM and non-REM sleep. In An Evolutionary Psychology of Sleep and Dreams (2004) he proposed an account built on genetic conflict and costly signaling theory. As summarized by Sandra Olliges, the argument is that REM sleep is physiologically costly and hard to fake, so the emotional tone of dreams could carry honest signals to others. McNamara and Szent-Imrey developed the costly-signaling account in a 2007 article in Evolutionary Psychology.

Olliges assessed the model in a 2010 article in the same journal. She found strong evidence that REM dreaming evolved adaptive functions and that it produces hard-to-fake emotional signals, but concluded that the theory would be stronger if it did not emphasize negative emotions. McNamara was also a co-author of comparative studies of sleep across mammal species, including a 2009 PLoS ONE paper that tested whether sleep plays a role in memory consolidation.

His textbook The Neuroscience of Sleep and Dreams (Cambridge University Press) appeared in a second edition in 2023; the publisher describes it as covering the neuroscience of sleep and dreams for upper-level undergraduate and graduate students, with a new focus on the social nature of sleep and dreams.

== Decentering ==
A central concept in McNamara's account of religious experience is decentering, which he first proposed in The Neuroscience of Religious Experience (2009) and developed further in the second edition of The Cognitive Neuroscience of Religious Experience (2022). He describes it as a brain-based process of culturally shaped personal transformation, and argues that religion can be seen as a "neurotechnology" for bringing it about. He argues that decentering takes place in four steps. First, the sense of self and executive control is temporarily reduced. After that, the old self-concept is held in a "suppositional" space, which is usually felt as an uncertain and liminal state. In this state the person drifts without a sense of agency, and the more complete the loss of the old self-concept, the more room there is for cultural input in rebuilding it. After this, the person searches memory and cultural scripts for material to revise or replace the self-concept. Fourth, a revised self-concept is bound back into executive control. McNamara originally claimed that this sequence characterizes all religious experiences; in the second edition he stresses all four steps for the transformational kind of religious experience he is concerned with.

In the second edition McNamara links decentering to the predictive processing framework, in which the brain updates its models of itself and the world by detecting surprise. He treats decentering as a special case of surprise: a mismatch between expected and actual input so large that it calls into question the brain's priors about the self, which then become the object of updating. He proposes that the orienting reaction in such cases involves pontine-geniculo-occipital waves, which are typical of REM sleep, so that decentering amounts to an intrusion of REM sleep neurobiology into waking consciousness. He says this gives the experience its liminal quality and makes people more willing to call it religious. In his account, the dreams that follow supply material for the supernatural agents he discusses in later chapters.

McNamara ties the first step of decentering to reduced activity in the default mode network, particularly in the precuneus and the anterior insula, which support the sense of self and agency. He suggests that signaling through the serotonin 2A receptor helps bring about this reduction. He notes that psychedelics acting on this receptor, such as LSD, reduce activity in these regions, and that the degree of ego dissolution people report correlates with the degree of downregulation.

McNamara has also related decentering to the metaxy, the Greek philosophical term for the intermediate space between the mortal and the eternal where the divine and the human meet. He argues that decentering is the brain process that gives access to this space, and that imagination plays a central part in it. He says that neuroscience and philosophical theology can inform each other, while holding that theological concepts should not constrain scientific inquiry and that neuroscience should not decide theological claims.

He describes the metaxy as a community of beings, good and evil, whom people meet through the imagination, and links this to his earlier work on supernatural agents and to reports of entity encounters under psychedelics. He concludes that the middle steps of decentering involve interaction with other beings and visions of more just forms of social life.

== Spirit possession ==
McNamara's two-volume Spirit Possession and Exorcism: History, Psychology, and Neurobiology (Praeger, 2011) applies cognitive neuroscience and evolutionary theory to spirit possession. He defines it as "the taking over of an individual's sense of agency and identity by a supernatural agent", and distinguishes a positive form from a negative, or demonic, one. Volume 1 follows positive possession from the Upper Paleolithic to the present, with chapters on the ancient world, divine kingship, Christianity and non-Western traditions. Volume 2 covers demonic possession, its brain basis, its relation to nightmares, and exorcism rituals from traditional societies to the Roman Ritual.

According to a review in Pneuma, McNamara traces both forms of possession to sacred kingship. The king was held to carry the community's sins and impurities and to be sacrificed in ritual, and when kings could no longer do this, vulnerable individuals took over the role; this, he argues, is what came to be called demon possession. The reviewers also report that he regards demonic possession as possibly rooted in brain disorders but not reducible to them.

The reviewers, Opoku Onyinah and Samuel Gakpetor, praised the book's use of evolutionary methods and called it worth engaging for anyone interested in how the sciences approach spirit possession. They criticized it for treating Christian claims about Jesus as products of a possession experience and for paying no attention to the spiritual dimension of faith.

== Reception ==
McNamara's The Neuroscience of Religious Experience (2009) was the subject of a review symposium in the journal Religion in 2011. Ann Taves, who introduced it, called him a prolific author and editor, praised his effort to bridge disciplines, and wrote that he had identified mechanisms, decentering and dreaming among them, that inform a range of cultural phenomena. The contributors also cautioned against building a grand theory of "religious experience" and against over-reading neuroscientific evidence.

In the same symposium, Uffe Schjødt described McNamara as well informed in functional neuroanatomy and agreed that studying the brain regions involved in religious thought and behavior is a promising approach. He argued, however, that McNamara did not make a convincing case that the "executive Self" can be located as a controlling entity in the brain, and that the available data do not describe religious experience as a single uniform category.

Other contributors to the symposium were Jared Lindahl and Travis Chilcott, who argued that his picture of religious experience as a path toward a goal is limited by its neglect of the range of goals and means in non-Western traditions, and Kelly Bulkeley, who found the evidence for McNamara's suggestion that dreams are the source of god concepts insufficient but thought it a promising bridge between dream research and the cognitive science of religion. Taves traced his concept of decentering to work on cognitive decoupling and pretend play, and argued that the human capacity for pretend play may matter more than religious practice for the development of the self.

Jay Feierman, reviewing the 2009 book in the Journal for the Scientific Study of Religion, wrote that what set it apart from other biologically oriented books on religion was that it breaks down the division between objective and subjective approaches and "literally gets into the brains, not minds, of persons of faith". He said McNamara "argues rather persuasively" that religion is a tool for self-regulation, called the arguments plausible and possibly durable, and described the book as "an important and scholarly work that makes significant advancements to our neuroscientific understanding of religious experience". He added that a few interpretations might stretch the evidence, that the line between theory, speculation and fact is not always clear, and that the book is not easy reading.

Ann Taves called the three-volume collection Where God and Science Meet (2006), which McNamara edited, "excellent". Reviewing it in Religious Studies Review, Nicholas Boeving said it gave scholars and informed lay readers "a fascinating glimpse" into recent evolutionary, neuroscientific and psychological findings on religion. He described it as "exhaustively documented", with enough breadth to satisfy specialists, although he found that the essays vary in sophistication and are best read as points of departure.

Reviewing the second edition of The Cognitive Neuroscience of Religious Experience (2022) in Arc, Daniel Miksha called it a clear and up-to-date overview of the literature that sets religious experience within the predictive processing framework and an evolutionary account linked to REM sleep. He wrote that the book places religious experience in a naturalistic framework without detracting from its complexity.

The publisher's page for the second edition of The Cognitive Neuroscience of Religious Experience carries five endorsements. Robin Dunbar called it "a very welcome update of the most important book to date on the neuroscience of religion." Jordan Grafman described it as a "brilliant synthesis" of the structural and functional neuroscience literature, and Uffe Schjødt, who had criticized the 2009 edition in the Religion symposium, called it "the best book available on the topic". John Vervaeke called it "an indispensable book for the cognitive science of religion", and Wesley J. Wildman, McNamara's collaborator at the Institute for the Biocultural Study of Religion, called it a reliable and up-to-date source on the cognitive neuroscience of religious and spiritual experiences.

== Later books ==
In Religion, Neuroscience and the Self: A New Personalism (Routledge, 2020), McNamara uses neuroscience findings on religious experience, the self and personhood to develop and question personalism, and proposes a form of personalism that fits current brain models of the self.

His 2026 book From Groups to Gods: Neuroscience and Evolution of the Collective Mind (Cambridge University Press) takes up what the publisher calls the "group mind" phenomenon. According to the publisher, it investigates the idea that human groups can, under certain conditions, develop distinct personalities and "minds" with quasi-rational decision-making, emotions and intentional states, and it examines how religious groups evolve, stay cohesive and shape individual brains.

== Books ==
=== Published ===
- Patrick McNamara, The cognitive neuroscience of religious experience. 2nd edition; Cambridge University Press, 2022, ISBN 978-1108833172
- Patrick McNamara, The neuroscience of sleep and dreams. 2nd edition; Cambridge University Press, 2023, doi:10.1017/9781009208840
- Patrick McNamara, The cognitive neuropsychiatry of Parkinson's Disease, MIT Press, 2011, ISBN 978-0-262-01608-7
- Patrick McNamara, The neuroscience of religious experience, Cambridge University Press, 2009, ISBN 978-0521889582
- Patrick McNamara, An evolutionary psychology of sleep and dreams. Praeger, 2004. ISBN 9780275978754
- Patrick McNamara, Nightmares : the science and solution of those frightening visions during sleep, Praeger, 2008, ISBN 978-0313345128
- Patrick McNamara, Spirit Possession and Exorcism: History, Psychology, and Neurobiology, 2 vols., Praeger, 2011, ISBN 978-0-313-38432-5
- Patrick McNamara, Mind and variability: Mental Darwinism, memory and self. Westport, CT: Praeger/Greenwood Press. 1999.
- Patrick McNamara and David Trumbull, An evolutionary psychology of leader-follower relations, Nova Science Publishers, 2007.
- Patrick McNamara, Religion, neuroscience and the self: A new personalism, Routledge, 2020, ISBN 978-0-367-02896-1
- Patrick McNamara, From groups to gods: Neuroscience and evolution of the collective mind, Cambridge University Press, 2026, doi:10.1017/9781009666206

=== Edited ===
- Deirdre Barrett and Patrick McNamara, Encyclopedia of Sleep and Dreams, Greenwood, 2012, ISBN 978-0313386640
- Patrick McNamara, ed., Where God and science meet : how brain and evolutionary studies alter our understanding of religion, Praeger Publishers, 2006, ISBN 0275987884
- Patrick McNamara and Wesley J. Wildman, eds., Science and the world's religions, Praeger, 2012, ISBN 978-0313387326
- Deirdre Barrett and Patrick McNamara, eds., The new science of dreaming, 3 vols., Praeger, 2007.
- Patrick McNamara, Robert A. Barton and Charles L. Nunn, eds., Evolution of sleep: Phylogenetic and functional perspectives, Cambridge University Press, 2010, ISBN 978-0-521-89497-5
- Jordan Grafman and Patrick McNamara, eds., The neural basis of religious cognition, Routledge, 2026, ISBN 978-0-367-74498-4
