= LAPD Air Support Division =

Division of Los Angeles Police, California, U.S.

Air Support Division
- LAPD Air Support Division Seal
- Active: 1956–present
- Country: United States
- Agency: Los Angeles Police Department
- Part of: Special Operations Group
- Headquarters: LAPD Hooper Heliport
- Motto: "The mission is the same, only the vehicle has changed"
- Abbreviation: ASD

Structure
- Pilots: 49
- Tactical Flight Officers: 25

Commanders
- Current commander: Captain Sean Parker

Equipment
- Aircraft: 16 helicopters; 1 fixed-wing

Website
- Official website

The Air Support Division (ASD) is the police aviation division of the Los Angeles Police Department (LAPD). It is the largest municipal airborne law enforcement organization in the United States and operates from the LAPD Hooper Heliport.

While originally devoted to aerial traffic enforcement, the ASD has grown to support a wide variety of police activity. Its operations are divided between Air Support To Regular Operations (ASTRO) and Special Flight Section (SFS). The Air Support Division currently operates sixteen helicopters and 1 fixed wing aircraft of two different helicopter brands, and maintains the largest municipal police aviation unit around the world, in addition to having the world's largest rooftop airport and world's busiest heliport.

According to a 2023 audit, there is little evidence that the sizable force of helicopters, which has operating costs of around $47 million a year, deter crime. This coupled with the noise and air pollution make the Air Support Division controversial.

== History ==
The ASD was established as the LAPD Helicopter Unit in 1956 with one Hiller UH-12C three-seat helicopter. They added a second helicopter in 1963 and a third in 1965 after the Watts Riots. The city operated Bell 47G and 47J model helicopters. In 1968, the unit received its first turbine-powered helicopter, the Bell 206A JetRanger, which significantly decreased police response times. With a major expansion in 1974, the Helicopter Unit was renamed the Air Support Division. At that time, the ASD grew to fifteen helicopters and one Cessna 210 crewed by 77 sworn personnel. In 1976, the ASD added the Special Flight Section (SFS), a unit dedicated to supporting undercover police operations. In this support role, SFS is a significant contributor to narcotics and serialized criminal investigations. In 1989, the ASD added its first Aerospatiale AS350 B1. The city replaced all but four of the Bell 206 JetRangers and retired the older piston models. LAPD air units provide aerial surveillance for vehicle pursuits, robberies, large crowd demonstrations, drug interdiction, and search and rescue missions. Air units are automatically requested when initiating a traffic stop on a suspect with known wants or warrants that are a felony in order to limit the potential for a pursuit. Aircraft will not fly during poor weather due to aviation safety.

== Organization ==
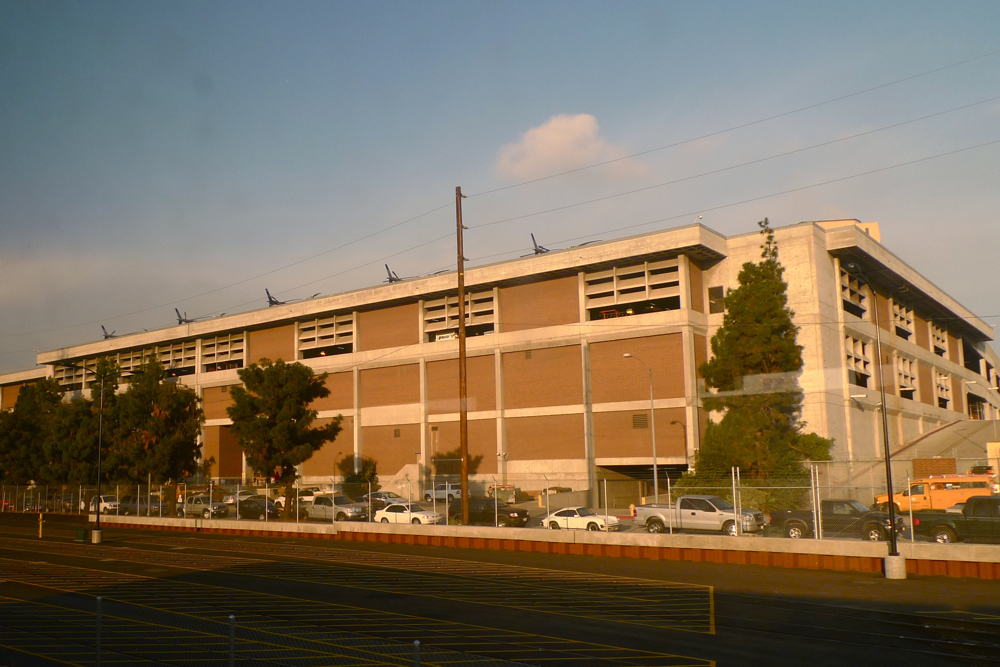
Hooper Heliport, the LAPD ASD's headquarters

The Air Support Division consists of 88 sworn personnel and 16 helicopters (which include one Bell 206B3 JetRangers, seven Airbus AS-350B2, seven Airbus H125, and one Bell 412), and one Beechcraft King Air 200 twin-engined aircraft.

Two officers with at least three years of patrol car service fly in each air unit. They are armed and able to land and make arrests in areas not accessible by other means.

The city of Los Angeles briefly flew a fleet of Bell 407s in the late 1990s as a replacement for the AS-350B1s. However, in 2000 the LAPD started replacing the 407s with more powerful AS-350B2s. Two of the 407s were sold to the General Services Department, which uses the helicopters on flights for the Department of Water and Power.

=== Fleet ===
- 7 Eurocopter AS350 B2 A-Star
- 7 Airbus H125
- 1 Bell 206 JetRanger
- 1 Bell 412
- 1 Beechcraft King Air 200

== Accidents and incidents ==
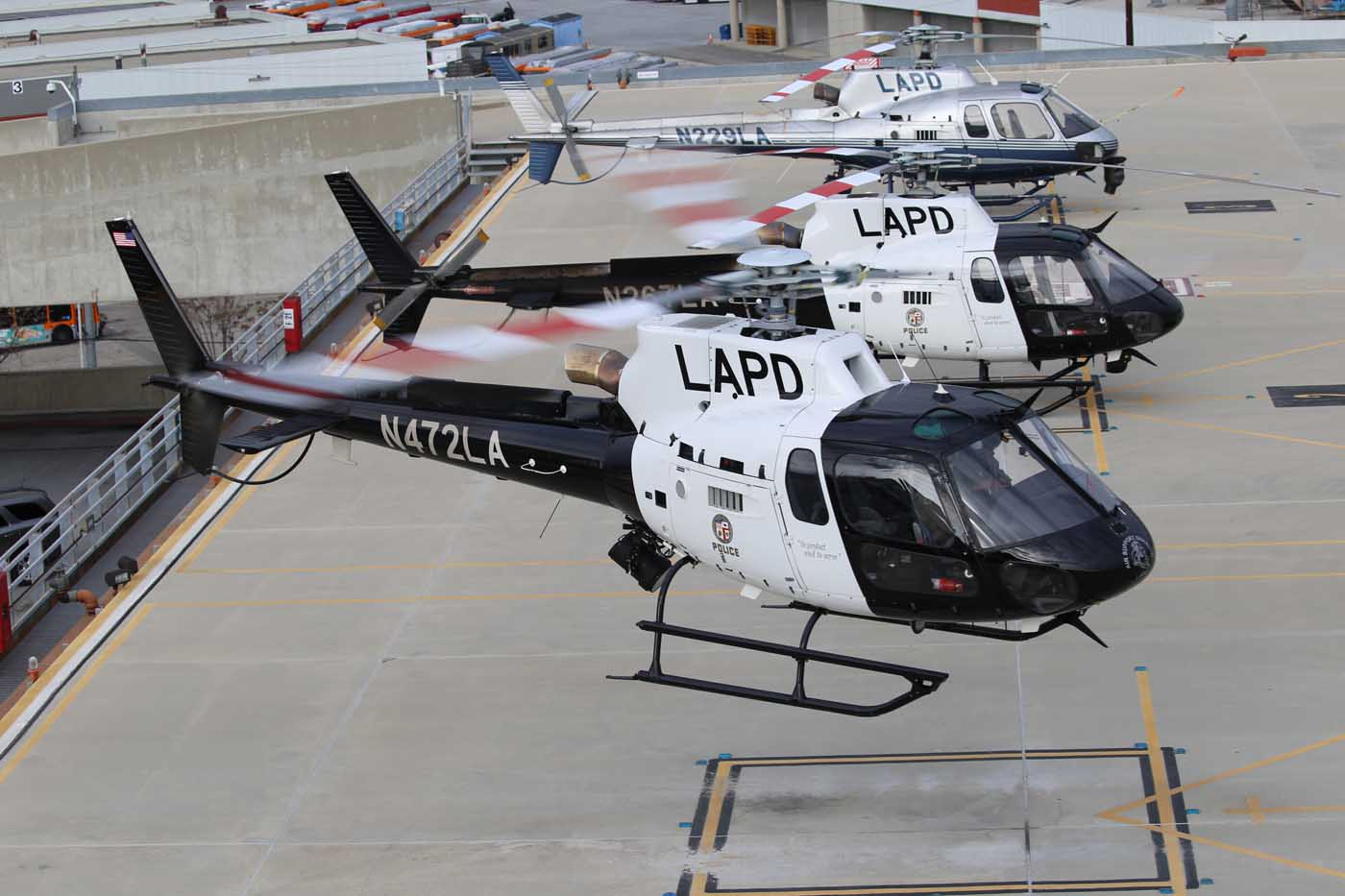
N472LA, N267LA, and N229LA, Eurocopter AS350 Écureuil helicopters operated by the LAPD ASD, at Hooper Heliport in 2021

On November 30, 1964, Sergeant Norman D. Piepenbrink was killed in a helicopter accident. On August 30, 1966, Policemen Larry Amberg and Alex N. Ilnicki, were on traffic patrol in Air 1 (Bell 47G, reg. N1162W) flying in the vicinity of Dodger Stadium, when a media helicopter (Bell 47G, reg. N1157W) was also in the area reporting on freeway traffic conditions. Air 1 and the media helicopter collided, resulting in the deaths of both officers and the occupants of the media helicopter. Policeman Ilnicki had about 401 hours of total flight time and 236 hours in type at the time of the crash

On May 29, 1974, Commander Paul J. Gillen was killed when his helicopter crashed.

On June 11, 1976, Officer Jeffrey B. Lindenberg was killed when the Bell 47G-5 helicopter (U.S. reg. N7085J) he was training in lost power and crashed while landing. Lindenberg was practicing simulated urban high-rise rooftop landings at an off-site pad on top of a small mountain near the Los Angeles Zoo in the hills above Hollywood. On short final approach, the engine lost power and the helicopter impacted 4 inches (100 mm) short of the pad. The helicopter rolled down the mountain side 162 feet (49 m). Lindenberg was killed and another officer was seriously injured. Lindenberg had been with the agency for seven years. Lindenberg was an experienced instrument rated pilot with 3575 hours of total flight time and 426 in type.

On March 1, 1983, Reserve Officer Stuart Taira was killed as a result of a police helicopter crash. Taira, an observer for the helicopter unit, and two other officers were conducting aerial patrols following a tornado. In between patrols the officers were dispatched to investigate a report of a burglar on a roof. As the helicopter took off it struck a power line, causing it to crash. The officers survived the initial impact and Taira was able to exit the aircraft. Taira then returned to the aircraft in an attempt to rescue his two partners. One of the helicopter's rotors struck Taira in the head, killing him. Taira was posthumously awarded the department's Medal of Valor.

On June 13, 1991, Officers Gary Alan Howe and Charles Randall Champe were killed when they experienced an in-flight engine failure which caused their helicopter to crash into a parking lot near Normandie Elementary School. They were flying an AS350B1 helicopter (U.S. reg. N214LA).
