= Pat McNamara (footballer) =

Australian rules footballer, born 1912

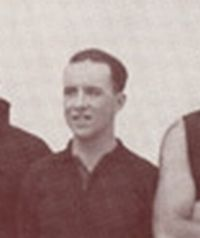

Personal information
- Full name: William Patrick McNamara
- Born: 10 January 1912
- Died: 11 April 1983 (aged 71); Canberra
- Original team: St Pat's
- Height: 180 cm (5 ft 11 in)
- Weight: 77 kg (170 lb)

Playing career^{1}
Years	Club	Games (Goals)
1934–1938	Melbourne	54 (0)
1939–1940	South Melbourne	22 (3)
Total		76 (3)
- ^{1} Playing statistics correct to the end of 1940.

William Patrick McNamara (10 January 1912 – 11 April 1983) was an Australian rules footballer who played with Melbourne and South Melbourne in the Victorian Football League (VFL).

The son of Carlton footballer, Bill McNamara, McNamara was a wingman and half-forward, originally from St Pat's in East Melbourne. He appeared in preliminary finals for Melbourne in 1937 and 1938. Having received a clearance, McNamara joined South Melbourne for the 1939 VFL season. He won the Gardiner Medal in 1941, for his performances with the South Melbourne seconds, whom he would also coach.

He moved to Canberra in about 1960 and coached the Australian National University football team. He died suddenly in Canberra in 1983.
